= List of Miss World countries =

This is a list of countries that have participated in the Miss World pageant and were still actively participating as of 2026. The pageant began in 1951.

== Entrants (1951–present) ==
Country/Territory	Debut	Participacions	Years competed	National title	Placements	Best placement	First placed	Last placed	Notes
Albania	2002	21	2002–2005; 2007–2021; 2025-present	Miss Universe Albania	0				Won Miss World Scholarship (Miss World Beauty with a Purpose) in 2003.
Angola	1998	21	1998–2004; 2006–2010; 2012–2013; 2017–2025	Miss Angola	3	1st runner-up: Micaela Reis (2007)	2006: Stiviandra Oliveira (Top 6)	2008: Birgite dos Santos (Top 5)	Won Miss World Africa in 2006, 2007, 2008.
Argentina	1959	61	1959–1981; 1987–present	Belleza Argentina	16	Winner: Norma Cappagli (1960); Silvana Suárez (1978)	1959: Amalia Scuffi (Top 15)	2026: Alina Akselrad (Top 20)	
Armenia	2017	5	2017–2021; 2025	Miss Armenia	0				
Australia	1955	61	1955; 1957; 1960; 1965; 1967–2019; 2023–present	Miss World Australia	32	Winner: Penelope Plummer (1968); Belinda Green (1972)	1955: Beverly Prowse (Top 8)	2025: Jasmine Stringer (Top 20)	Won Miss World Oceania in 1981, 1982, 1983, 1984, 1988, 1989, 2013, 2014, 2015, 2016, 2025; Won Miss World Asia-Oceania/Asia-Pacific in 1991, 2006.
Bahamas	1966	55	1966; 1968–1995; 1997–2000; 2002–2021; 2026-Present	Miss Bahamas	3	Top 10: Jody Weech (1992)	1992: Jody Weech (Top 10)	2021: Sienna Evans (Top 40)	
Bangladesh	1994	13	1994–1996; 1999–2001; 2017–2019; 2023–present	Miss Bangladesh	2	Top 30: Jannatul Ferdous Oishee (2018)	2017: Jessia Islam (Top 40)	2018: Jannatul Ferdous Oishee (Top 30)	Head To Head Challenge winner in 2017, 2018.
Belgium	1954	69	1954–present	Miss Belgium	11	Top 8: Christine Delit (1962)	1962: Christine Delit (Top 8)	2026: Olga Lombardo (Top 20)	Won Miss World Europe in 2016; Won Miss World Friendship in 1969; Won Designer Dress Award in 2004.
Belize	1987	23	1987–1991; 2002–2003; 2007–2018; 2021–present	Miss World Belize	2	Top 40: Elise-Gayonne Vernon (2023); Faith Edgar (2026)	2023: Elise-Gayonne Vernon (Top 40)	2026: Faith Edgar (Top 40)	Co-won Beauty with a Purpose in 2026
Bolivia	1975	50	1960–1961; 1963; 1965; 1975; 1977; 1979–present	Miss Bolivia	5	Top 10: Carla Morón (1995)	1982: Brita Cederberg (Top 15)	2014: Andrea Forfori (Top 25)	
Bosnia and Herzegovina	1996	27	1996–present	Miss Bosne i Hercegovine	1	Top 20: Danijela Vinš (2002)	2002: Danijela Vinš (Top 20)	2002: Danijela Vinš (Top 20)	Won Miss World Top Model in 2014.
Botswana	1972	32	1972–1974; 1994-2013; 2015–present	Miss Botswana	6	1st runner-up: Emma Wareus (2010)	2010: Emma Wareus (1st runner-up)	2025: Anicia Gaothusi (Top 40)	Won Miss World Africa in 2010, 2023; Head-to-head Challenge winner in 2021, 2023.
Brazil	1958	63	1958–1987; 1990–present	Miss Brazil World	31	Winner: Lúcia Petterle (1971)	1960: Maria Edilene Torreão (Top 10)	2026: Gabriela Botelho (Top 12)	Won Miss World Americas in 2012, 2013, 2015, 2019, 2025, 2026; Won Miss World Beauty with a Purpose in 2023; Won Miss World Beach Beauty in 2013; Won Best National Costume in 1996; Won Miss Photogenic in 1998; Won Miss Personality in 1983; Co-won Miss World Beauty with a Purpose in 2014.
Bulgaria	1988	30	1988; 1990–2013; 2015–present	Miss World Bulgaria	1	Top 10: Evgenia Kalkandzhieva (1995)	1995: Evgenia Kalkandzhieva (Top 10)	1995: Evgenia Kalkandzhieva (Top 10)	
Cambodia	2006	6	2006; 2019–present	Miss World Cambodia	1	Top 40: Leakena In (2026)	2026: Leakena In (Top 40)	2026: Leakena In (Top 40)	Co-won People's Choice Award in 2026
Cameroon	2013	9	2013–2015; 2017–2018; 2021–present	Miss Cameroon	3	Top 20: Issie Princesse (2025)	2021: Audrey Monkam (Top 40)	2025: Issie Princesse (Top 20)	Head to Head Challenge winner in 2021; Co-won Miss World Multimedia in 2025.
Canada	1957	63	1957–1960; 1962–1990; 1992–2014; 2016–present	Miss World Canada	17	1st runner-up: Connie Fitzpatrick (1984); Leanne Caputo (1989); Nazanin Afshin-Jam (2003)	1960: Danica d'Hondt (Top 18)	2026: Angelina Fan (Top 40)	Won Miss World Americas 1989, 2003; Won Miss World Talent in 2009; Won Miss World Sport in 2003, 2006; Co-won People's Choice Award in 2026; Co-won World Designer Award in 2026.
Cayman Islands	1977	38	1977–1995; 1997–2001; 2003–2004; 2006–2008; 2010–2011; 2016–present	Miss Cayman Islands	1	Top 15: Maureen Lewis (1982)	1982: Maureen Lewis (Top 15)	1982: Maureen Lewis (Top 15)	Won Miss World Caribbean in 1994.
Chile	1963	47	1963; 1966–1969; 1976–1979; 1981–2004; 2006–2008; 2011–2013; 2015–present	Miss World Chile	6	Top 10: Daniella Campos (1998); Isabel Bawlitza (2000)	1967: Margarita Téllez (Top 15)	2021: Carol Drpic (Top 40)	Won Miss World Americas 1998; Won Miss World Talent 2011; Head To Head Winner in 2018; Miss Friendship in 1966.
China	1994	23	1994; 2001–present	Miss China World	15	Winner: Zhang Zilin (2007); Yu Wenxia (2012)	2001: Li Bing (Top 5)	2026: Yifei Dong (Top 20)	Won Miss World Asia-Pacific in 2001, 2002, 2003, 2007, 2010; Won Miss World Talent 2012; Won Miss World Top Model in 2007, 2016; Co-won Designer Award in 2018, 2026.
Colombia	1963	57	1963–1965; 1967–1970; 1973–1981; 1983–present	Miss Mundo Colombia	16	1st runner-up: Nini Soto (1981); Rocío Luna (1983); Carolina Arango (1996); Natalia Peralta (2002)	1968: Beatriz Gonzalez (3rd runner-up)	2021: Andrea Aguilera (Top 13)	Won Miss World Americas in 1983, 1996, 2002; Head To Head Challenge Winner in 2017.
Cook Islands	1987	9	1987–1990; 2016–2019; 2026-Present	Miss Cook Islands	4	Top 12: Tajiya Eikura Sahay (2019)	2016: Natalia Short (Top 20)	2026: Tiarē Henry-Anguna (Top 20)	Won Miss World Sport in 2016; Miss World Oceania in 2019, 2026.
Côte d'Ivoire	1985	14	1985; 2009–2017; 2021–present	Miss Côte d'Ivoire	1	2nd runner-up: Olivia Yacé (2021)	2021: Olivia Yacé (2nd runner-up)	2021: Olivia Yacé (2nd runner-up)	Won Miss World Top Model in 2021; Won Miss World Multimedia in 2021; Head to Head Challenge Winner in 2021
Croatia	1992	31	1992–2019; 2023–present	Miss Croatia	7	1st runner-up: Anica Martinović (1995)	1993: Fani Čapalija (Top 5)	2023: Lucija Begić (Top 40)	Won Miss World Europe in 1993, 1994,1995; Won Miss World Sport 2023; Won Best Dress Designer in 2006.
Curaçao	1975	42	1975–1978; 1980–1996; 1998; 2000; 2002–2004; 2006–present	Señorita Curaçao	1	Top 20: Ayanette Statia (2002)	2002: Ayanette Statia (Top 20)	2002: Ayanette Statia (Top 20)	Won Miss World Caribbean in 2000.
Czech Republic	1993	29	1993–2016; 2018–present	Miss Czech Republic	5	Winner: Taťána Kuchařová (2006); Krystyna Pyszková (2023)	1998: Alena Šeredová (Top 5)	2023: Krystyna Pyszková (Winner)	Won Miss World Northern Europe in 2006.
Denmark	1951	63	1951–1970; 1974–1995; 2000; 2003–2019; 2023–present	Miss Denmark	17	1st runner-up: Lilian Madsen (1957); Pia Rosenberg (1986)	1954: Grete Hoffenblad (5th runner-up)	2019: Natasja Kunde (Top 40)	
Dominican Republic	1966	54	1966–present	Miss Dominican Republic	16	Winner: Mariasela Álvarez (1982); Joheirry Mola (2026)	1966: Jeanette Dotel (Top 15)	2026: Joheirry Mola (Winner)	Won Miss World Sport in 2011, 2017; Won Miss World Beach Beauty in 2007; Co-won Miss World Multimedia in 2025; Co-won Miss World Top Model in 2026; Co-win Miss World Beauty with a Purpose in 2026.
Ecuador	1960	56	1960–1962; 1964–1972; 1974; 1976–1989; 1991–2025	Concurso Nacional de Belleza Ecuador	5	Top 7: Alicia Cucalón (1986)	1970: Sofía Monteverde (Top 15)	2021: Ámar Pacheco (Top 40)	Co-Won Miss World Beauty with a Purpose in 2007.
El Salvador	1975	37	1975–1979; 1982–1993; 2004–present	Reinado de El Salvador	1	Top 15: Fátima Cuéllar (2017)	2017: Fátima Cuéllar (Top 15)	2017: Fátima Cuéllar (Top 15)	
England	2000	24	2000–present	Miss England	9	2nd runner-up: Stephanie Hill (2017)	2011: Alize Lily Mounter (Top 7)	2026: Grace Richardson (Top 40)	Competed as Britain in 1951; as Great Britain from 1952 to 1957; as United Kingdom from 1958 to 1999. Won Miss World Europe in 2011; Won Miss World Beach Beauty in 2011; Head-to-head Challenge winner in 2023; Won Miss World Talent in 2026
Equatorial Guinea	2012	10	2012–2014; 2016–2021; 2025-Present	Miss Equatorial Guinea	0				
Eritrea	2026	1	2026–present	Miss World Eritrea	1	Top 6: Snit Tewoldemedhin (2026)	2026: Snit Tewoldemedhin (Top 6)	2026: Snit Tewoldemedhin (Top 6)	Co-won People's Choice Award in 2026
Estonia	1994	17	1994–2007; 2021–2025	Miss Estonia	2	Top 10: Karin Laasmae (1999)	1999: Karin Laasmae (Top 10)	2025: Elise Randmaa (Top 40)	Won Miss World Sport in 2025
Ethiopia	2003	20	2003–2019, 2023-present	Miss Ethiopia	2	1st runner-up: Hasset Dereje Admassu (2025)	2003: Hayat Ahmed (Top 20)	2025: Hasset Dereje Admassu (1st runner-up)	Won Miss World Africa in 2003 and 2025.
Finland	1952	70	1952–1957; 1959–2004; 2006–present	Miss Finland	18	Winner: Marita Lindahl (1957)	1952: Eva Hellas (3rd runner-up)	2014: Krista Haapalainen (Top 25)	Won Miss World Sport in 2014.
France	1951	73	1951–present	Miss France	33	Winner: Denise Perrier (1953)	1951: Jacqueline Lemoine (3rd runner-up)	2026: Indira Ampiot (Top 12)	Won Miss World Europe in 2019; Won Miss World Top Model in 2018; Co-Won Miss World Top Model in 2026; Co-Won World Designer Award in 2026
French Guiana	2026	1	2026–present	Miss World French Guiana	1	Top 40: Audrey Ho-Wen-Tsaï (2026)	2026: Audrey Ho-Wen-Tsaï (Top 40)	2026: Audrey Ho-Wen-Tsaï (Top 40)	Co-won Miss World Multimedia in 2026
Germany	1952	69	1952–2018; 2023–present	Miss World Germany	18	Winner: Petra Schürmann (1956); Gabriella Brum (1980); (dethroned/resigned)	1952: Vera Marks (2nd Runner-Up)	2026: Julia Kühnle (Top 40)	Co-won Miss World Multimedia in 2026; Head-to-Head Challenge Winner in 2026.
Ghana	1959	33	1959; 1967–1968; 1989–1991; 1994–2002; 2004–2011; 2013–2014; 2016–present	Miss Ghana	6	2nd runner-up: Carranzar Shooter (2013)	1967: Araba Vroom (Top 15)	2016: Antoinette Kemavor (Top 20)	Won Miss World Africa 2013; Won Miss World Beauty with a Purpose in 2006; Won Miss World Talent in 2007; Won Best Evening Gown 1995; Co-Won Miss World Beauty with a Purpose in 2011.
Gibraltar	1959	61	1959; 1964–present	Miss Gibraltar	4	Winner: Kaiane Aldorino (2009)	2009: Kaiane Aldorino (Winner)	2026: Julia Horne (Top 20)	Won the People's Choice Award in 2013; Co-Won People's Choice Award in 2026.
Greece	1953	72	1953–2019; 2023–present	Star Hellas	10	Winner: Irene Skliva (1996)	1953: Alexandra Ladikou (1st runner-up)	2003: Vasiliki Tsekoura (Top 15)	
Guadeloupe	2003	21	2003–present	Miss International Guadeloupe	1	Top 30: Brigitte Golabkan (2012)	2012: Brigitte Golabkan (Top 30)	2012: Brigitte Golabkan (Top 30)	
Guatemala	1976	42	1976; 1979–2000; 2003; 2005–2019; 2023-Present	Miss Guatemala	3	Top 20: Lourdes Figueroa (2011)	2011: Lourdes Figueroa (Top 20)	2017: Virginia Argueta (Top 40)	
Guinea	2013	9	2013–2017; 2021–present	Miss World Guinea	1	Top 40: Nene Bah (2021)	2021: Nene Bah (Top 40)	2021: Nene Bah (Top 40)	
Guinea-Bissau	2013	7	2013; 2016; 2018–2023; 2026-Present	Miss World Guinea-Bissau	0				
Guyana	1966	30	1966–1971; 1988–1989; 1999; 2001–2010; 2012–2019; 2023–present	Miss Guyana	9	2nd runner-up: Shakira Caine (1967)	1966: Umblita Van Sluytman (Top 15)	2019: Joylyn Conway (Top 40)	Won Miss World Caribbean in 2014; Won Miss World Talent in 2015; Head-to-head challenge winner in 2019; Co-Won Miss World Beauty with a Purpose in 2014.
Haiti	1975	12	1975; 2013–present	Miss Haiti	2	Top 7: Joelle Apollon (1975)	1975: Joelle Apollon (Top 7)	2025: Christee Guirand (Top 40)	
Honduras	1955	43	1955; 1959; 1964–1967; 1972–1984; 1986–1991; 1993; 1997; 1999–2000; 2004; 2008–2013; 2015–2025	Miss Honduras	0				
Hungary	1989	33	1989–1992; 1994–present	Magyarország Szépe	4	1st runner-up: Edina Kulcsár (2014)	2011: Linda Szunai (Top 30)	2021: Lili Tótpeti (Top 40)	Won Miss World Europe in 2014.
India	1959	59	1959–1962; 1966; 1968–1975; 1978–present	Femina Miss India	32	Winner: Reita Faria (1966); Aishwarya Rai (1994); Diana Hayden (1997); Yukta Mookhey (1999); Priyanka Chopra (2000); Manushi Chhillar (2017)	1960: Iona Pinto (Top 18)	2026: Nikita Porwal (Top 40)	Won Miss World Asia and Oceania in 1994, 1997, 1999, 2000, 2008; Won Miss World Asia in 2014, 2019; Won Miss World Beauty with a Purpose in 2009, 2012; Won Miss World Multimedia in 2012, 2013; Head to Head Challenge Winner in 2017, 2018, 2019; Won Miss Photogenic in 1994, 1997; Won Best in National Costume in 1993; Won Best in Evening wear/Evening Gown in 1966, 1996; Won Best in Swimwear in 1997; Won Best Body in 1966; Most Popular Delegate in 1978; Co-Won Miss World Beauty with a Purpose in 2014, 2017. Co-Won Miss World Top Model in 2025.
Indonesia	1982	20	1982–1983; 2005–present	Miss Indonesia	13	2nd runner-up: Maria Harfanti (2015); Natasha Mannuela Halim (2016)	2011: Astrid Yunadi (Top 15)	2026: Audrey Bianca (Top 40)	Won Miss World Asia in 2015, 2016, 2021; Won Miss World Beauty with a Purpose in 2015, 2016, 2025; Won Miss World Talent in 2013, 2025; Head to Head Challenge Winner in 2017; Won the Best World Dress Designer Award in 2017; Co-Won Miss World Beauty with a Purpose in 2011, 2014, 2017; Co-Won Miss World Multimedia in 2026.
Ireland	1952	74	1952–present	Miss Ireland	18	Winner: Rosanna Davison (2003)	1960: Irene Kane (Top 10)	2025: Jasmine Gerhardt (Top 20)	Won Miss World Talent in 2010; Co-Won Miss World Top Model in 2025.
Italy	1954	67	1954–1962; 1964–1968; 1970–1976; 1978–present	Miss World Italy	14	1st runner-up: Giorgia Palmas (2000)	1960: Layla Rigazzi (Top 10)	2025: Chiara Esposito (Top 20)	Won Miss World Europe in 2000, 2005.
Jamaica	1959	62	1959; 1962–1974; 1976–present	Miss Jamaica World	29	Winner: Carole Crawford (1963); Cindy Breakspeare (1976); Lisa Hanna (1993); Toni-Ann Singh (2019)	1959: Sheila Chong (Top 15)	2025: Tahje Bennett (Top 40)	Won Miss World Caribbean in 1990, 1991, 1993, 1997, 1998, 1999, 2003, 2006, 2012, 2013, 2015, 2018; Won Miss World Talent in 2019; Won Miss World Scholarship (Miss World Beauty with a Purpose) in 2004.
Japan	1956	68	1956–present	Miss World Japan	13	3rd runner-up: Midoriko Tokura (1956)	1956: Midoriko Tokura (3rd runner-up)	2018: Kanako Date (Top 30)	Won Miss World Asia in 1981; Won Miss World Talent in 2018; Won Miss World Sport in 2009.
Kazakhstan	1998	22	1998–2000; 2002–2004; 2006–2013; 2015–2019; 2023–present	Miss Kazakhstan	7	Top 5: Margarita Kravtsova (2000)	2000: Margarita Kravtsova (Top 5)	2017: Gul'banu Azimkhan (Top 40)	Won Miss World Top Model in 2011.
Kenya	1960	36	1960; 1967–1968; 1984–1986; 1988–1991; 1994; 1996; 1999–present	Miss World Kenya	12	Top 5: Evelyn Njambi (2016); Magline Jeruto (2017)	1960: Jasmine Batty (Top 18)	2026: Trizah Muhenje Akala (Top 20)	Won Miss World Africa in 1984, 1988, 1990, 2000, 2016, 2017; Won Miss World Beauty with a Purpose in 2010; Won the Tourism Promotional Video Award in 2018; Co-Won Miss World Beauty with a Purpose in 2014.
South Korea	1959	62	1959–1971; 1973–2001; 2003–2023; 2026-Present	Miss Queen Korea	11	1st runner-up: Choi Yeon-hee (1988)	1960: Lee Young-hee (Top 10)	2017: Kim Ha-eun (Top 10)	Won Miss World Asia & Oceania in 2009, 2017; Won Miss World Scholarship (Miss World Beauty with a Purpose) in 2005; Won the Best Dress Design Award in 2007; Won Best in Evening Gown in 2001.
Kosovo	2013	3	2013–2014; 2026-Present	Miss World Kosova	0				
Kyrgyzstan	2011	8	2011; 2013–2016; 2019; 2025-Present	Miss Kyrgyzstan	0				
Laos	2017	4	2017–2019; 2026-Present	Laos at beauty pageants	0				
Latvia	1989	30	1989–1999; 2001–2016; 2018; 2025-Present	Mis Latvija	0				
Lebanon	1960	53	1960–1961; 1964–1967; 1969–1970; 1973–1975; 1977; 1979–1988; 1991–2018; 2023–present	Miss Lebanon	10	1st runner-up: Yasmina Zaytoun (2023)	1973: Sylvia Ohannessian (Top 15)	2026: Perla Harb (Top 40)	Head-to-head Challenge Winner in 2017, 2018, 2023; Won Best in Interview in 2015.
Madagascar	1960	11	1960–1961; 1974; 1990; 1999–2001; 2017–2018; 2021–2025	Miss Madagascar	2	Top 40: Nellie Anjaratiana (2021); Antsaly Rajoelina (2023)	2021: Nellie Anjaratiana (Top 40)	2023: Antsaly Rajoelina (Top 40)	
Malawi	2001	5	2001; 2005; 2010; 2012; 2026-Present	Miss Malawi	1	Top 40: Ireen Navicha (2026)	2026: Ireen Navicha (Top 40)	2026: Ireen Navicha (Top 40)	
Malaysia	1963	52	1963; 1965–1966; 1970–1975; 1978–1989; 1991–2016; 2018–present	Miss World Malaysia	13	2nd runner-up: Lina Teoh (1998); Taanusiya Chetty (2026)	1963: Catherine Loh (Top 14)	2026: Taanusiya Chetty (2nd runner-up)	Won Miss World Asia & Oceania in 1998; Won Miss World Asia in 2026; Won Miss World Talent in 2014; Head to Head to Head Challenge Winner in 2018; Co-won Miss World Beauty with a Purpose 2026.
Maldives	2026	1	2026–present	Miss World Maldives	0				
Malta	1965	55	1965–1966; 1968–1993; 1997–present	Miss World Malta	2	Top 15: Mary Brincat (1969)	1969: Mary Brincat (Top 15)	2017: Michela Galea (Top 40)	Won Miss World Talent in 2017.
Martinique	2005	15	2005–2014; 2018; 2023-present	Martinique Queens	4	3rd runner-up: Aurélie Joachim (2025)	2009: Ingrid Littré (Top 16)	2025: Aurélie Joachim (3rd runner-up)	Won Miss World Caribbean in 2025; Won Miss World Top Model in 2024; Co-Won Miss World Top Model in 2025.
Mauritius	1970	37	1970–1973; 1975; 1978–1980; 1986–1994; 1998; 2003–present	Miss Mauritius	4	Top 10: Jeanne-Françoise Clement (1989)	1975: Mariella Tse-Sik-Sun (Top 15)	2023: Liza Gundowry (Top 12)	Won Miss World Africa in 1989; Head to Head Challenge Winner in 2018; Co-won World Designer Award in 2026
Mexico	1951	59	1951; 1963; 1966–present	Miss México Organization	19	Winner: Vanessa Ponce (2018)	1972: Gloria Gutiérrez (Top 15)	2021: Karolina Vidales (Top 6)	Won Miss World Americas in 2005, 2007, 2009, 2017; Won Miss World Top Model in 2004, 2009; Won Miss World Sport in 2021; Won Miss World Beach Beauty in 2008; Head to Head Challenge Winner in 2017, 2018, 2019; Won Best in Swimwear in 1996.
Moldova	2000	20	2000; 2003–2011; 2013–2025	Miss Moldova	2	Top 40: Ana Badaneu (2017); Elizaveta Kuznitova (2019)	2017: Ana Badaneu (Top 40)	2019: Elizaveta Kuznitova (Top 40)	Head to Head Challenge Winner in 2017, 2019.
Mongolia	2005	19	2005–present	Miss World Mongolia	5	Top 11: Bayartsetseg Altangerel (2016)	2010: Sarnai Amar (Top 25)	2021: Burte-Ujin Anu (Top 40)	Won Miss World Talent in 2016, 2021; Won Miss World Multimedia 2017; Head to Head Challenge Winner in 2017; Won People's Choice in 2016, 2017.
Montenegro	2006	17	2006–2019; 2023-Present	Miss Montenegro	1	Top 40: Andrea Nikolic (2025)	2025: Andrea Nikolic (Top 40)	2025: Andrea Nikolic (Top 40)	Co-won Miss World Multimedia in 2025
Morocco	1956	10	1956–1958; 1964–1968; 2023; 2026-Present	Miss Maroc	0				
Mozambique	2026	1	2026–present	Miss World Mozambique	1	Top 40: Arcénia Quehá (2026)	2026: Arcénia Quehá (Top 40)	2026: Arcénia Quehá (Top 40)	
Myanmar	1960	10	1960; 2014–2019; 2023-Present	Miss Myanmar World	0				Competed as Burma in 1960. Has been competing as Myanmar since 2014.
Namibia	1989	24	1989–1993; 1997; 2000–2011; 2013–2015; 2021–present	Miss Namibia	4	Top 5: Michelle McLean (1991)	1991: Michelle McLean (Top 5)	2025: Selma Kamanya (Top 8)	Competed as part of South Africa in 1989 due to being under administration of South Africa until 1990 when Namibia gained its independence. Won Miss World Sports in 2015; Co-Won Miss World Top Model in 2025.
Nepal	1997	24	1997–2000; 2002–2005; 2007; 2009–present	Miss Nepal	7	Top 10: Ishani Shrestha (2013)	2012: Shristi Shrestha (Top 30)	2023: Priyanka Rani Joshi (Top 40)	Won Miss World Beauty with a Purpose in 2013, 2018, 2019; Won Miss World Multimedia in 2018, 2019; Head-to-Head challenge winner in 2019, 2021.
Netherlands	1951	73	1951–present	Miss World Netherlands	15	Winner: Corine Rottschäfer (1959); Catharina Lodders (1962)	1958: Luciënne Struve (4th runner-up)	2015: Margot Hanekamp (Top 20)	Competed as Holland until 2004. Won Miss World Sport in 2013.
New Zealand	1956	63	1956; 1961–2019; 2023–present	Miss World New Zealand	21	1st runner-up: Elaine Miscall (1963); Lauralee Martinovich (1997)	1961: Leone Mary Main (Top 7)	2025: Samantha Poole (Top 40)	Won Miss World Oceania in 2017.
Nicaragua	1960	27	1960–1961; 1964; 1968–1971; 1974–1975; 1977; 1998; 2001–2005; 2011–present	Miss Mundo Nicaragua	3	Top 5: Ligia Argüello (2001)	1968: Margine Davidson (Top 7)	2021: Sheynnis Palacios (Top 40)	Won Miss World Americas in 2001; Head to Head Challenge winner in 2021.
Nigeria	1963	37	1963; 1967–1970; 1978; 1984–1985; 1987–1994; 1996; 1998–present	Most Beautiful Girl in Nigeria	11	Winner: Agbani Darego (2001)	1987: Mary Bienoseh (Top 15)	2026: Tamunosoye Karibi-George (Top 12)	Won Miss World Africa in 2001, 2002, 2004, 2019; Won Miss World Top Model in 2017, 2019; Head-to-head challenge winner in 2019, 2023.
North Macedonia	1996	16	1996; 2001–2007; 2009–2013; 2015; 2025-Present	Miss North Macedonia	0				Competed as Macedonia FYRO until 2015. Has been competing as North Macedonia since 2025.
Northern Ireland	2000	24	2000–present	Miss Northern Ireland	8	Top 6: Anna Leitch (2021)	2005: Lucy Evangelista (Top 15)	2025: Hannah Johns (Top 40)	Competed as Britain in 1951; as Great Britain from 1952 to 1957; as United Kingdom from 1958 to 1999. Won Miss World Talent in 2006; Won Miss World Sport in 2010.
Pakistan	2026	1	2026–present	Miss Pakistan World	0				
Panama	1967	42	1967; 1971; 1977; 1979–1980; 1982–2007; 2009–present	Señorita Panamá	7	4th Runner-Up: Marissa Burgos (1983)	1979: Lorelay de la Ossa (Top 15)	2025: Karol Rodriguez (Top 40)	Won Miss World Americas in 2018.
Paraguay	1959	41	1959; 1969; 1971–1972; 1976–1980; 1982–2000; 2003–2004; 2007–present	Miss Mundo Paraguay	5	Top 15: Daisy Ferreira (1985)	1985: Daisy Ferreira (Top 15)	2021: Bethania Borba (Top 40)	Head-to-Head challenge winner in 2019, 2021; Won Miss Personality in 1977.
Peru	1959	51	1959; 1963; 1965; 1967–1968; 1973; 1975–1990; 1994–present	Miss Perú Mundo	10	Winner: Madeline Hartog-Bel (1967); María Julia Mantilla (2004)	1959: María Elena Rossel (1st runner-up)	2026: Josiane Sciotti (Top 20)	Head to Head Challenge Winner in 2017; Won Best World Dress Designer in 2003.
Philippines	1966	56	1966–1975; 1978–present	Miss World Philippines	23	Winner: Megan Young (2013)	1968: Cecilia Amabuyok (4th runner-up)	2026: Asia Rose Simpson (Top 12)	Miss World Asia in 1982, 1986, 2013, 2025; Won Miss World Top Model in 2013; Won Miss World Multimedia in 2015, 2016; Head-to-Head challenge winner in 2019, 2021, 2026; Won Best National Costume in 1971; Co-Won Miss World Beauty with a Purpose in 2017.
Poland	1983	41	1983–present	Miss Polonia	13	Winner: Aneta Kręglicka (1989); Karolina Bielawska (2021)	1985: Katarzyna Zawidzka (Top 15)	2026: Maja Todd (Top 40)	Won Miss World Europe in 2025
Portugal	1959	47	1959; 1962–1964; 1967; 1970–1973; 1979; 1982–2001; 2003–2006; 2008; 2010–present	Miss República Portuguesa	3	2nd runner-up: Ana Paula de Almeida (1971)	1971: Ana Paula de Almeida (2nd runner-up)	2019: Inês Brusselmans (Top 40)	
Puerto Rico	1959	50	1959; 1970–1985; 1989–2016; 2018–present	Miss World Puerto Rico	20	Winner: Wilnelia Merced (1975); Stephanie Del Valle (2016)	1975: Wilnelia Merced (Winner)	2026: Suil Pagán (Top 40)	Won Miss World Caribbean in 2005, 2011; Won Miss World Beach Beauty in 2010; Won Miss World Sport in 2026.
Romania	1990	24	1990–1992; 1995–1996; 1999–2007; 2009–2011; 2013–2017; 2023-2025	Miss World Romania	1	1st Runner-Up: Ioana Boitor (2006)	2006: Ioana Boitor (1st Runner-Up)	2006: Ioana Boitor (1st Runner-Up)	Won Miss World Southern Europe in 2006.
Scotland	1999	24	1999–present	Miss Scotland	9	2nd runner-up: Juliet-Jane Horne (2001)	2001: Juliet-Jane Horne (2nd runner-up)	2026: Eilidh MacDonald (Top 40)	Competed as Britain in 1951; as Great Britain from 1952 to 1957; as United Kingdom from 1958 to 1998. Won Miss World Europe in 2001.
Senegal	2017	7	2017–present	Miss Senegal	1	Top 20: Fatoumata Diop (2026)	2026: Fatoumata Diop (Top 20)	2026: Fatoumata Diop (Top 20)	
Serbia	2006	17	2006–2018; 2021–present	Miss Serbia	2	Top 31: Milica Tepavac (2011)	2011: Milica Tepavac (Top 31)	2025: Aleksandra Rutovic (Top 40)	
Sierra Leone	1986	15	1986; 1988; 1990; 2007–2012; 2016; 2018–2019; 2023-present	Miss Sierra Leone	1	Top 16: Mariatu Kargbo (2009)	2009: Mariatu Kargbo (Top 16)	2009: Mariatu Kargbo (Top 16)	Won Miss World Talent in 2009.
Singapore	1972	50	1972–1976; 1978–present	Miss Singapore World	2	Top 15: Pauline Poh (1976)	1976: Pauline Poh (Top 15)	2018: Vanessa Peh (Top 30)	Head to Head Challenge Winner 2018.
Slovenia	1992	30	1992–2009; 2011–present	Miss Slovenia	0				
Somalia	2021	4	2021–present	Miss Somalia	3	Top 13: Khadija Omar (2021)	2021: Khadija Omar (Top 13)	2025: Zainab Jama (Top 40)	
South Africa	1956	54	1956–1977; 1991–present	African Beauty International	38	Winner: Penelope Coelen (1958); Anneline Kriel (1974); (replaced dethroned winner): Rolene Strauss (2014)	1957: Adele Kruger (2nd runner-up)	2026: Romanda Hombir (Top 6)	Country was barred from participating from 1978 to 1990 due to the practice of apartheid. Won the Designer Award in 2018 and 2025; Won Miss World Africa 1991, 1992, 1993, 1994, 1995, 1996, 1997, 1998, 1999, 2009, 2011, 2014, 2015, 2026; Co-Won Miss World Beauty with a Purpose in 2017; Head-to-Head Challenge Winner in 2026.
South Sudan	2012	11	2012–2019; 2023-Present	Miss South Sudan	4	Top 7: Atong Demach (2012)	2012: Atong Demach (Top 7)	2015: Arek Abraham Albino (Top 40)	Won Miss World Africa in 2012; Won Miss World Top Model in 2012.
Spain	1960	57	1960–1964; 1970–1974; 1976–present	Miss Spain	20	Winner: Mireia Lalaguna (2015)	1961: Carmen Fernández (2nd runner-up)	2026: Elisabeth Reynés (1st runner-up)	Won Miss World Europe in 2026; Won Miss World Top Model in 2015; Co-won Miss World Beauty with a Purpose in 2026.
Sri Lanka	1953	54	1953–1955; 1961; 1963–1968; 1970–1971; 1973–1975; 1977–1982; 1984–2000; 2003–present	Miss World Sri Lanka	5	3rd runner-up: Manel Illangakoon (1953)	1953: Manel Illangakoon (3rd runner-up)	2021: Sadé Greenwood (Top 40)	Competed as Ceylon until it was renamed in 1972.
Suriname	1961	11	1961; 1963–1966; 1981; 2007; 2009–2010; 2012; 2025	Miss Suriname	0				
Sweden	1951	71	1951–2017; 2019–present	Miss World Sweden	23	Winner: Kiki Håkansson (1951); May-Louise Flodin (1952); Mary Stävin (1977)	1951: Kiki Håkansson (Winner)	2017: Hanna-Louise Hääg (Top 40)	Won Miss World Sport in 2012; Won Miss World Beach Beauty in 2014.
Tanzania	1967	27	1967; 1994–2023; 2026–present	Miss World Tanzania	3	Top 6: Nancy Sumari (2005)	2005: Nancy Sumari (Top 6)	2026: Latricia Ian Sawe (Top 40)	Was previously separated into Zanzibar and Tanganyika. Tanganyika previously competed in 1960. Won Miss World Africa in 2005.
Thailand	1968	51	1968; 1970–1997; 1999; 2001–2019; 2023–present	Miss World Thailand	11	Winner: Suchata Chuangsri (2025)	1968: Pinnarut Tananchai (Top 15)	2025: Suchata Chuangsri (Winner)	Won Miss World Asia in 1989, 2018; Won Miss World Asia & Oceania in 1992; Head to Head Challenge Winner in 2018; Won Global Vote/People's Choice in 2014, 2018; Miss Personality in 1994, 1997; Miss Photogenic in 2001; Co-won Miss World Multimedia in 2025.
Togo	2023	2	2023–2025	Miss World Togo	0				
Trinidad and Tobago	1954	51	1954; 1966; 1971; 1975–present	Miss Trinidad and Tobago	17	Winner: Giselle Laronde (1986)	1976: Patricia Leon (Top 15)	2026: Georgia-Lee Gill (Top 40)	Won Miss World Americas in 1986; Won Miss World Caribbean in 1995, 2007, 2008, 2019, 2026; Won Miss World Beauty with a Purpose in 2008; Head-to-head Challenge winner in 2025, 2026.
Tunisia	1956	20	1956–1958; 1963–1964; 1967–1971; 1974–1975; 1978; 2013–2017; 2019–2025	Miss Tunisie	4	3rd runner-up: Jacqueline Tapia (1957)	1957: Jacqueline Tapia (3rd runner-up)	2025: Lamis Redissi (Top 20)	Won Miss World Talent 2023
Turkey	1956	53	1956; 1958; 1960–1961; 1963–1964; 1966–1973; 1975–1983; 1985–present	Miss Turkey	10	Winner: Azra Akın (2002)	1961: Güler Samuray (Top 15)	2026: Sıla Saraydemir (Top 40)	Won Miss World Europe in 1991; Head-to-head Challenge winner in 2025; Won Best Dress Designer in 2002, 2005, 2011.
Uganda	1967	27	1967–1968; 1985; 1988–1989; 1992–1993; 1996–1997; 2001–2005; 2007–2016; 2018–present	Miss Uganda	4	Top 5: Quiin Abenakyo (2018)	2018: Quiin Abenakyo (Top 5)	2025: Natasha Nyonyozi (Top 40)	Won Miss World Africa in 2018; Head to Head Challenge Winner in 2018.
Ukraine	1992	30	1992; 1994–present	Miss Ukraine	10	Top 8: Maria Melnychenko (2025)	2000: Olena Scherban (Top 10)	2026: Valeriia Lisovska (Top 20)	
United States	1951	73	1951–present	Miss World America	52	Winner: Marjorie Wallace (1973); Gina Tolleson (1990); Alexandria Mills (2010)	1953: Mary Griffin (4th runner-up)	2026: Mary Sickler (Top 20)	Won Miss World Americas in 1985, 1990, 1997, 2010, 2014, 2016, 2021; Won Miss World Beauty with a Purpose in 2021; Won Miss World Talent in 2002; Won Miss World Sports in 2007, 2018; Won Miss World Multimedia in 2014; Won Miss World Beach Beauty in 2004; Won Best Dress Designer in 2008, 2023; Won Miss Personality in 1987.
Venezuela	1955	65	1955–1958; 1961–1978; 1980–present	Miss World Venezuela	33	Winner: Susana Duijm (1955); Pilín León (1981); Astrid Carolina Herrera (1984); Ninibeth Leal (1991); Jacqueline Aguilera (1995); Ivian Sarcos (2011)	1955: Susana Duijm (Winner)	2021: Alejandra Conde (Top 40)	Won Miss World Americas in 1975, 1981, 1984, 1987, 1988, 1991, 1992, 1993, 1994, 1995, 1999, 2011; Won Miss World Beach Beauty in 2006; Head to Head Challenge Winner in 2017, 2018, 2019, 2021; Won Best National Costume in 1994; Won Miss Photogenic in 1984, 1989, 1990, 1995, 1996, 200.
Vietnam	2002	22	2002–present	Miss World Vietnam	13	Top 6: Lê Nguyễn Bảo Ngọc (2026)	2002: Phạm Thị Mai Phương (Top 20)	2026: Lê Nguyễn Bảo Ngọc (Top 6)	Miss World Multimedia in 2023; Head to Head Challenge Winner in 2017; Co-won Miss World Beauty with a Purpose in 2017; Co-won Miss World Top Model in 2026.
Wales	1999	24	1999–present	Miss Wales	6	1st runner-up: Sophie Moulds (2012)	2004: Amy Guy (Top 15)	2026: Helena Hawke (Top 40)	Competed as Britain in 1951; as Great Britain from 1952 to 1957; as United Kingdom from 1958 to 1998. Won Miss World Europe in 2012; Won Miss World Sports in 2004; Won Miss World Beach Beauty in 2012; Head-to-head Challenge winner in 2025.
Zambia	1974	20	1974; 1992; 1995–1999; 2003–2006; 2008–2010; 2013; 2015; 2017–2018; 2025-Present	Miss Zambia	2	Top 12: Adah Mushibi (2026)	2025: Faith Bwalya (Top 40)	2026: Adah Mushibi (Top 12)	Head-to-head Challenge winner in 2025; Co-win Miss World Multimedia in 2026.
Zimbabwe	1980	26	1980–1982; 1993–2012; 2014–2015; 2017–2018; 2023–present	Miss World Zimbabwe	8	3rd Runner-Up: Angeline Musasiwa (1994)	1980: Shirley Richard Nyanyiwa (Top 15)	2026: Brunette Makanyiso (Top 12)	Head-to-head Challenge winner in 2023; Co-win Miss World Beauty with a Purpose in 2026.

=== Replaced pageants ===
The following list consists of the delegations that have acquired the national Miss World franchise and replaced a former national pageant. Some of the former organizations still remain active for other purposes.

Country/Territory	Former pageant(s)	Current pageant	Franchise since
Albania	Miss Albania (2002–2010)	Miss Universe Albania	2011
Angola	Miss Angola (1998-2012)	Miss World Angola	2013
Argentina	Miss Argentina (1959–2003)	Belleza Argentina	2004
Brazil	Miss Brasil (1958–1980; 1998–2005); Miss Brasil Mundo (1981–1997; 2006–2015)	Miss Brasil CNB	2016
Cambodia	Miss World Cambodia (2019); Miss Cambodia (2021)	Miss World Cambodia	2022
Canada	Miss Toronto (1957); Miss Maple Leaf (1958–1959); Miss Canada (1960); Miss Dominion of Canada (1962–1979)	Miss World Canada	1980
Colombia	Señorita Colombia (1963–1991)	Miss Mundo Colombia	1992
Czech Republic	Miss České a Slovenské Republiky (1993); Miss České republiky (1994–2009); Česká Miss (2010–2016)	Miss Czech Republic	2017
Denmark	Miss Bikini Denmark (1951); Frøken Danmark (1963–2003); Miss World Denmark (2004–2014)	Miss Danmark	2015
Dominican Republic	Miss Dominican Republic (1966–2002)	Miss Mundo Dominicana	2003
El Salvador	Miss El Salvador (1975–2005); Nuestra Belleza El Salvador (2006–2017)	Reinado de El Salvador	2018
Ethiopia	Miss Ethiopia (1963-2002); Ethiopian Beauty Queens (2003–2012)	Miss Ethiopia	2013
France	Miss Bikini France (1951); Miss France (1952; 1961–1966; 1969–1984; 1987–1998); Mademoiselle France (1953–1956; 1959–1960); Miss French Algeria (1957); Miss Cinémonde (1958; 1967–1968); Miss France Outre-Mer (1985–1986); Miss France Monde — Comité Miss France de Paris (1999–2003)	Miss France	2004
Germany	Miss Germany (1952-1991); Miss World Germany (1992–1999); German's Miss World (2000–2001); Miss Germany World (2002–2007); Miss World Deutschland (2008–2009)	Miss World Germany	2010
Grenada	Miss Grenada (1970; 1996)	Miss Grenada World	2007
Guam	Miss Guam (1971-1996)	Miss World Guam	2011
Iceland	Ungfrú Ísland (1955–2017)	Miss World Iceland	2018
Indonesia	Puteri Indonesia – Ali Sadikin Directorship (1977); Miss Indonesia - Andi Nurhayati Directorship (1982–1983); Puteri Indonesia (2005)	Miss Indonesia	2006
Italy	Miss Italia (1959–1962; 1964; 1971; 1978); Miss World Italy (1954–1958; 1965–1970; 1972–1977; 1979–2004)	Miss Mondo Italia	2005
South Korea	Miss Korea (1959–2010); Miss World Korea (2011–2017)	Miss Queen Korea	2018
Kosovo	Miss World Kosova (2013-2014)	Miss Universe Kosovo	2018
Laos	Miss Universe Laos (2017)	Miss World Laos	2018
Malaysia	Miss Malaysia World (1963–2016)	Miss World Malaysia	2018
Malta	Miss Malta (1965–2001)	Miss World Malta	2002
Mexico	Señorita México (1963–1992); Miss Mundo México/Miss World America & Mexico (1993–1994); Nuestra Belleza México (1995–2015)	Miss Mexico	2016
Morocco	Miss Maroc (1956–1958; 1964–1968)	Miss World Maroc	2023
Myanmar	Miss Burma (1960)	Miss World Myanmar	2014
Netherlands	Miss Holland (1951–1988); Miss Nederland (1989–2007; 2009–2015); Miss World Netherlands (2008)	Miss World Nederland	2016
New Zealand	Miss New Zealand (1956–1990); Miss Universe New Zealand (1991–1995)	Miss World New Zealand	1996
Nigeria	Miss World Nigeria (1963); Miss Nigeria (1967–1985)	Most Beautiful Girl in Nigeria	1987
Norway	Frøken Norge (1952–2011); Miss World Norway (2012–2016)	Miss Norway	2017
Paraguay	Miss Paraguay (1959–2002); Miss World Paraguay (2003)	Reinas de Belleza del Paraguay	2004
Philippines	Miss Philippines (1966–1968); Miss Republic of the Philippines (1969–1976); Mutya ng Pilipinas (1977–1991); Binibining Pilipinas (1992–2010)	Miss World Philippines	2011
Poland	Miss Polonia (1983–1989; 1991–2006); Miss Polski (1990; 2007–2014; 2017); Miss World Poland (2015–2016)	Miss Polonia	2018
Portugal	Miss Portugal (1959–2002); Miss Mundo Portugal (2003–2013)	Miss República Portuguesa	2014
Puerto Rico	Miss Puerto Rico (1959); Miss Puerto Rico for Miss World (1970–1985); Miss Puerto Rico World (1989–1995)	Miss Mundo de Puerto Rico	1996
Romania	Miss Romania (1990–2017)	Miss World Romania	2023
Russia	Miss Russia (1992–1994); Krasa Rossii (1995–2006)	Miss Russia	2007
South Africa	Miss World South Africa (2023–2025); Miss South Africa (1956–1969; 1977–2022); Miss South Africa and Miss Africa South (1970–1976)	African Beauty International	2026
Spain	Miss Spain (1960–2012); Be Miss World Spain (2013–2016)	Nuestra Belleza España	2017
Sweden	The Prettiest Girl in Sweden (1951); Fröken Sverige (1952–2002); Miss World Sweden (2003–2019)	Miss Sweden	2021
Switzerland	Miss Switzerland (1952–2005)	Miss World Switzerland	2013
Tahiti	Miss Tahiti (1960–2002); Miss World Tahiti (2006–2009)	Miss French Polynesia	2010
Thailand	Miss Thailand (1968-1984); Miss Thailand World (1985–2023)	Miss World Thailand	2025
United Kingdom	Miss World Britain (1951); Miss Great Britain (1952–1957); Miss United Kingdom (1958–1998/1999)	Miss England; Miss Northern Ireland; Miss Scotland; Miss Wales	1999/2000
United States	Queen of the United States (1958–1959); Miss USA World (1962–1966); Miss USA (1953–1957; 1981–1991); Miss World America (1978–1980; 1992–1993); Miss World USA (1967–1977; 1998–2000); US Miss World (2003–2006); Miss United States (1960–1961; 1994; 2014)	Miss World America	2018
US Virgin Islands	Miss World Virgin Islands (1976–1980); Miss American Virgin Islands (1982–2005); Miss World US Virgin Islands (2010); Miss US Virgin Islands (2011); Miss U.S. Paradise (2012–2016)	Miss World US Virgin Islands	2019
Vietnam	Miss Vietnam (2002; 2004; 2006; 2012; 2014); Miss Vietnam World (2007; 2010–2011); Miss Aodai Vietnam (2015–2016)	Miss Vietnam; Miss World Vietnam	2017/2019

== Inactive entrants ==
=== Former entities ===
Country	Debut	Years competed	National Title	Placements	Best Placement	First placement	Last Placement	Notes
Czechoslovakia	1967	1967; 1969; 1989–1992	1967–1969: Dívka Roku Československa; 1989–1992: Miss Československo	2	5th Runner-Up: Alžbeta Štrkulová (1967)	1967: Alžbeta Štrkulová (5th Runner-Up)	1969: Marcela Bitnarová (Top 15)	Split into the Czech Republic and Slovakia in 1993. Both joined the pageant that year.
Rhodesia and Nyasaland	1959	1959–1961; 1965	1959–1961: Miss Rhodesia and Nyasaland; 1965: Miss Rhodesia	2	Top 7: Lesley Bunting (1965)	1959: Vivien Lentin (Top 11)	1965: Lesley Bunting (Top 7)	Competed as Rhodesia and Nyasaland in 1959 & 1961; as Southern Rhodesia in 1960; as Rhodesia in 1965. Split into Malawi, Zambia and Rhodesia (later renamed Zimbabwe). Zambia later joined the pageant in 1974, Zimbabwe joined in 1980, and Malawi joined in 2001.
Serbia and Montenegro	2003	2003–2005	Miss Serbia and Montenegro	0				In June 2006, split into Montenegro and Serbia after declaring their independence from each other and joined the pageant independently later that year. Kosovo, a disputed territory by Serbia, joined in 2013.
Tanganyika	1960	1960	Miss Tanganyika	0				Unified with Zanzibar in 1964 to become the United Republic of Tanzania. The newly unified Tanzania joined in 1967.
(Soviet Union) USSR	1989	1989–1990	Miss USSR	0				Split into Russia, Ukraine, Estonia, Georgia, Kazakhstan, Latvia, Lithuania, Belarus, Moldova, Armenia, Azerbaijan, Uzbekistan, Turkmenistan, Kyrgyzstan and Tajikistan. Won Miss Photogenic in 1989.
(Socialist Federal Republic of Yugoslavia) / Yugoslavia	1966	1966–1975; 1982–1991; 1996–2002	Miss Yugoslavia	9	4th Runner-Up: Lidija Velkovska (1975)	1968: Ivona Puhlera (Top 15)	2002: Ana Šargić (Top 20)	Socialist Federal Republic of Yugoslavia was dissolved in April 1992. Former member states Croatia, and Slovenia both joined the pageant in 1992. Former member states North Macedonia and Bosnia and Herzegovina both joined in 1996. The new Federal Republic of Yugoslavia competed until 2002, when it was renamed Serbia & Montenegro.

=== Territories ===
Denmark

Constituent country	Debut	Years competed	National Title	Placements	Best Placement	First placement	Last Placement	Notes
Greenland	1991	1991–1992	Miss Greenland	0				

France

Overseas region	Debut	Years competed	National Title	Placements	Best Placement	First placement	Last Placement	Notes
St. Barthélemy	2011	2011	Miss St. Barthelemy	1	Top 20: Johanna Sansano (2011)	2011: Johanna Sansano (Top 20)	2011: Johanna Sansano (Top 20)	
Tahiti	1960	1960; 1965; 1976–1979; 1981–1982; 1984–1985; 1994–1996; 1999–2002; 2006; 2009–2010	Miss French Polynesia	2	4th Runner-Up: Marie Moua (1965)	1965: Marie Moua (4th Runner-Up)	2010: Mihilani Teixeira (Top 25)	Competed as Tahiti from 1960 to 2009. Competed as French Polynesia in 2010. Won Best Dress Designer in 2010.

Netherlands

Special Municipality	Debut	Years competed	National Title	Placements	Best Placement	First placement	Last Placement	Notes
Aruba	1964	1964; 1966; 1972–1985; 1989–1993; 1995–2019	Miss Aruba	5	1st runner-up: Zizi Lee (2001)	1990: Gwendolyne Kwidama (Top 10)	2013: Larisa Leeuwe (Top 20)	Won Miss World Caribbean in 1996, 2001 & 2002.
Bonaire	1996	1996; 2011–2012	Miss Bonaire	0				
Sint Maarten	1998	1998–1999; 2001; 2021	Miss Sint Maarten	0				

South Africa

Country	Debut	Years competed	National Title	Placements	Best Placement	First placement	Last Placement	Notes
Africa South	1970	1970–1976	Miss Africa South (Miss South Africa for Blacks)	3	1st Runner-Up: Pearl Jansen (1970)	1970: Pearl Jansen (1st Runner-Up)	1974: Evelyn Williams (Top 15)	Was the black representative from South Africa. From 1970 to 1976, South Africa had one white and one black representative at Miss World. The white used a sash with South Africa on it and the black used a sash with Africa South on it. Won Miss Congeniality in 1970.

United Kingdom

Country	Debut	Years competed	National Title	Placements	Best Placement	First placement	Last Placement	Notes
United Kingdom	1951	1951–1999	Miss United Kingdom	37	Winner: Rosemarie Frankland (1961); Ann Sidney (1964); Lesley Langley (1965); Helen Morgan (1974); (dethroned/resigned): Sarah-Jane Hutt (1983)	1951: Laura Ellison-Davies (1st Runner-Up); Doreen Dawne (2nd Runner-Up); Aileen P. Chase (4th Runner-Up)	1997: Vicki-Lee Walberg (Top 10)	Competed as Britain in 1951; Great Britain from 1952 to 1957; as United Kingdom from 1958 to 1999. Now Competes as a four separate delegates from England, Scotland, Wales, and Northern Ireland
Crown Dependencies	Debut	Years competed	National Title	Placements	Best placement	First placement	Last Placement	Notes
Guernsey	1974	1974–1975	Miss Guernsey	0				
Isle of Man	1977	1977–1988	Miss Isle of Man	0				
Jersey	1974	1974–1981	Miss Jersey	0				
Overseas Territory	Debut	Years competed	National Title	Placements	Best placement	First placement	Last Placement	Notes
Bermuda	1971	1971–1989; 1992–1993; 1995; 2011–2015	Miss Bermuda	2	Winner: Gina Swainson (1979)	1979: Gina Swainson (Winner)	1980: Zina Marie Minks (Top 15)	
Montserrat	1964	1964	Miss Montserrat	1	Top 16: Helen Joseph (1964)	1964: Helen Joseph (Top 16)	1964: Helen Joseph (Top 16)	
Turks & Caicos	1982	1982–1988; 2004	Miss Turks & Caicos	0				

United States

State/Territory	Debut	Years competed	National Title	Placements	Best Placement	First placement	Last Placement	Notes
Hawaii	1959	1959; 2001	Miss Hawaii World	0				Competed at Miss World America from 1960 to 2000 & 2002–present
Unincorporated Territory	Debut	Years competed	National Title	Placements	Best Placement	First placement	Last Placement	Notes
Guam	1971	1971–1996; 2011–2018	Miss World Guam	7	1st Runner-Up (Winner): Kimberly Santos (1980) (replaced dethroned winner)	1971: Deborah Bordallo Nelson (Top 15)	2012: Jeneva Bosko (Top 30)	Won Miss World Oceania in 1987.
Northern Marianas	2003	2003	Miss Marianas	0				

=== Others ===
The following list consists of countries and territories that have not sent a delegate to the pageant since 2023, or no longer holds the Miss World franchise, but participated at least once in the past:

State	Debut	Years competed	National Title	Placements	Best Placement	First placement	Last Placement	Notes
Algeria	2002	2002	Miss Algeria	0				
Andorra	2003	2003	Miss Andorra	0				
Antigua and Barbuda	1986	1986; 1991; 2001–2004; 2008; 2016; 2019	Miss Antigua & Barbuda	2	Top 15: Shermain Jeremy (2004)	2004: Shermain Jeremy (Top 15)	2019: Taqiyyah Francis (Top 40)	Competed as Antigua in 1986 and 1991. Won Best Talent in 2004.
Austria	1955	1955–1957; 1959; 1961–1981; 1983–2001; 2006–2009; 2011–2018	Miss Austria	16	Winner: Eva Rueber-Staier (1969); Ulla Weigerstorfer (1987)	1955: Felicitas von Goebel (Top 8)	2007: Christine Reiler (Top16)	
Barbados	1974	1974–1975; 1983–1988; 1990; 1995; 2000–2006; 2008–2014; 2018–2019	Miss Barbados World	3	Top 10: Linda Field (1974)	1974: Linda Field (Top 10)	2018: Ashley Lashley (Top 30)	Won Miss World Caribbean in 2009. Won Miss World Talent in 2001 & 2008. Won the People's Choice Award in 2009.
Belarus	2000	2000; 2003–2004; 2006–2014; 2016; 2018–2019	Miss Belarus	1	Top 5: Maria Vasilevich (2018)	2018: Maria Vasilevich (Top 5)	2018: Maria Vasilevich (Top 5)	Won of Miss World Europe title was in 2018.
British Virgin Islands	1986	1986; 1988; 1990–1998; 2000–2001; 2013–2019	Miss British Virgin Islands	1	Top 40: Rikkiya Brathwaite (2019)	2019: Rikkiya Brathwaite (Top 40)	2019: Rikkiya Brathwaite (Top 40)	Won Miss World Sports in 2019.
Cape Verde	1997	1997; 2010; 2017	Miss Cape Verde	0				
Chad	2014	2014	Miss Chad	0				
(Taiwan) / Chinese Taipei	1961	1961–1962; 1964; 1988–1998; 2000; 2004–2005; 2008; 2013	Miss Chinese Taipei	2	1st Runner-Up: Grace Li Shiu-ying (1961)	1961: Grace Li Shiu-ying (1st Runner-Up)	1964: Linda Lin Su-hsing (2nd Runner-Up)	Competed as Republic of China until 1988 and in 1992, China Taiwan in 1988, Taiwan in 1989 and 1993 and 1996 and 1997, Taiwan (R.O.C.) in 1994 and 1995, Chinese Taipei in 1991 and 1998 and 2000 and 2004–2005 and 2008 and 2013.
Congo DR	1985	1985; 2005–2006; 2008; 2016	Miss Congo (RDC)	1	Top 15: Kayonga Mureka Tete (1985)	1985: Kayonga Mureka Tete (Top 15)	1985: Kayonga Mureka Tete (Top 15)	Competed as Zaire in 1985. Won Miss Photogenic in 1985.
Costa Rica	1965	1965–1969; 1972; 1974–2001; 2003–2016; 2019–2023	Reinas de Costa Rica	3	Top 15: Maribel Guardia (1978); Ana Lorena González (1986)	1965: Marta Escalante (Top 16)	1986: Ana Lorena González (Top 15)	Won Miss World Scholarship (Miss World Beauty with a Purpose) in 2001.
Cuba	1955	1955; 1975	Miss Cuba	2	3rd Runner Up: Gilda Marin (1955); Maricela Maxie Clark (1975)	1955: Gilda Marin (3rd Runner Up)	1975: Maricela Maxie Clark (3rd Runner Up)	
Cyprus	1960	1960–1963; 1973; 1976–1989; 1991–2018	Star Cyprus	1	Top 18: Mary Mavropoulos (1960)	1960: Mary Mavropoulos (Top 18)	1960: Mary Mavropoulos (Top 18)	
Dominica	1978	1978; 2013	Miss Dominica	0				
Egypt	1953	1953–1954; 1956; 1988; 1990; 1997; 2004; 2008–2011; 2014; 2016–2018	Miss Egypt	2	Winner: Antigone Costanda (1954)	1953: Marina Papaelia (2nd Runner-up)	1954: Antigone Costanda (Winner)	
Fiji	2004	2004; 2012–2017	Miss Fiji	0				
Gabon	2012	2012–2015	Miss Gabon	0				
Gambia	1965	1965–1967; 1969–1970; 1983–1986	Miss Gambia	0				
Georgia	2003	2003–2019	Miss Georgia	1	Top 20: Irina Onashvili (2003)	2003: Irina Onashvili (Top 20)	2003: Irina Onashvili (Top 20)	Won Best in Talent/Miss World Talent in 2003.
/ Grenada	1970	1970; 1996; 2007	Miss Grenada World	2	Winner: Jennifer Hosten (1970)	1970: Jennifer Hosten (Winner)	2007: Vivian Burkhardt (Top 16)	
Hong Kong	1959	1959; 1970; 1972–1988; 1992–2014; 2017–2019	Miss Hong Kong Pageant	4	Top 12: Pauline Yeung (1987)	1983: Maggie Cheung (Top 15)	2019: Lila Lam (Top 40)	Competed as an overseas territory of the UK until 1997 when it was handed back to China. Won Miss World Asia in 1987; Miss Personality in 1974. Co-won Miss World Beauty with a Purpose in 2007.
Iceland	1955	1955–1967; 1969–1973; 1975–1994; 1999–2001; 2003–2011; 2013; 2015–2021	Miss World Iceland	7	Winner: Hólmfríður Karlsdóttir (1985); Linda Pétursdóttir (1988); Unnur Vilhjálmsdóttir (2005)	1983: Unnur Steinsson (Top 7)	2021: Hugrún Birta Egilsdóttir (Top 40)	Won Miss World Europe in 1985, 1988 & 2005.
Iraq	2021	2021–2023	Miss Iraq	0				Failed attempts to compete in both 1998 & 2017.
Israel	1953	1953; 1955–1963; 1965–2012; 2014; 2016–2017	Miss Israel	24	Winner: Linor Abargil (1998)	1956: Rina Weiss (2nd Reunner-Up)	2012: Shani Hazan (Top 30)	Won Miss World Europe in 1998.
Jordan	1959	1959–1960; 1962–1963; 1965–1966	Miss Jordan	0				
Lesotho	1979	1979–1981; 2003; 2010; 2023	Miss World Lesotho	0				
Liberia	1962	1963–1965; 1968–1970; 1972; 1983; 1985; 1988; 1998–1999; 2005–2006; 2009; 2011; 2017; 2023	Miss Liberia	4	Top 5: Sebah Esther Tubman (1999)	1963: Ethel Zoe Norman (Top 15)	2017: Wokie Dolo (Top 40)	Head-to-head Challenge Winner in 2017.
Lithuania	1993	1993; 1995–1998; 2000; 2002–2004; 2007–2014	Miss Lithuania	0				
Luxembourg	1957	1957; 1959–1971; 1973; 1975–1977; 1985–1990; 2009–2010; 2014; 2018–2021	Miss Luxembourg	0				
Macau	1986	1986–1997; 2010; 2012; 2017; 2019–2023	Miss Macau	1	Top 15: Lan Wan-Ling (2017)	2017: Lan Wan-Ling (Top 15)	2017: Lan Wan-Ling (Top 15)	Compete as an Overseas Territory of Portugal until 1999 when it was handed back to China. Was a Head to Head Challenge Winner in 2017.
Monte Carlo	1953	1953; 1955	Miss Monaco	0				
Norway	1953	1953; 1958–1960; 1966–2015; 2017–2018; 2021–2023	Miss Norway	10	1st runner-up: Ingeborg Sørensen (1972)	1960: Grethe Solhoy (Top 18)	2010: Mariann Birkedal (Top 7)	Won Miss World Top Model in 2010.
Papua New Guinea	1977	1977; 1980–1981; 1987–1990	Miss Papua New Guinea	0				
Russia	1992	1992–2019	Miss Russia	13	Winner: Julia Kourotchkina (1992); Ksenia Sukhinova (2008)	1992: Julia Kourotchkina (Winner)	2019: Alina Sanko (Top 12)	Won Miss World Europe in 1992 & 2008; Miss World Beach Beauty in 2005; Miss World Top Model in 2008.
Rwanda	2016	2016–2021	Miss Rwanda	0				
Saint Lucia	1975	1975; 1994; 2004–2006; 2008; 2010; 2016; 2021	Miss Saint Lucia World	2	Top 15: Sophia St. Omer (1975)	1975: Sophia St. Omer (Top 15)	2010: Aiasha Gustave (Top 25)	Won Miss World Caribbean in 2010.
Samoa	1977	1977–1988; 2013; 2015; 2019	Miss Samoa	0				
São Tomé and Príncipe	2014	2014	Miss São Tomé and Príncipe	0				
St. Kitts & Nevis	1985	1985–1988; 2010; 2012–2013; 2015	Miss St. Kitts & Nevis	0				
Seychelles	1969	1969–1973; 1975; 1992; 1994–1998; 2008; 2012–2017	Miss Seychelles	2	Top 15: Jane Straevens (1972); June Gouthier (1973)	1972: Jane Straevens (Top 15)	1973: June Gouthier (Top 15)	Won Miss Personality in 1973.
Slovakia	1993	1993–2023	Miss Slovakia	2	Top 20: Karolína Chomisteková (2013); Kristína Činčurová (2016)	2013: Karolína Chomisteková (Top 20)	2016: Kristína Činčurová (Top 20)	
(Saint Vincent and the Grenadines) / St. Vincent and the Grenadines	1978	1978; 1985–1987; 1989; 1994	Miss St. Vincent and the Grenadines	0				Competed as St. Vincent in 1978.
Swaziland	1975	1975; 1978–1980; 1983–1988; 1991–1999; 2002–2003; 2005; 2007–2009	Miss Swaziland	1	Top 15: Ilana Faye Lapido (1986)	1986: Ilana Faye Lapido (Top 15)	1986: Ilana Faye Lapido (Top 15)	Now known as "Eswatini". Won Miss Photogenic in 1975; Miss World Scholarship (Miss World Beauty with a Purpose) in 2002.
Switzerland	1952	1952–1953; 1956; 1966–1968; 1970–2001; 2003–2005; 2013–2014	Miss World Switzerland	8	1st Runner-Up: Sylvia Müller (1952)	1952: Sylvia Müller (1st Runner-Up)	2003: Bianca Sissing (Top 20)	
Syria	1965	1965–1966	Miss Syria	0				
Tonga	1983	1983; 1986	Miss Tonga	0				
Uruguay	1959	1959–1962; 1964–1965; 1975–1988; 1990–1993; 1996–2003; 2005–2006; 2008–2012; 2014–2017; 2021–2023	Miss Uruguay	4	Top 5: Katja Thomsen (2000)	1962: María Noel Genovese (Top 15)	2000: Katja Thomsen (Top 5)	Won Miss World Americas in 2000
US Virgin Islands	1976	1976; 1978–1980; 1982–2002; 2005; 2010–2016; 2019	Miss US Virgin Islands	3	Top 10: Vania Thomas (1989)	1989: Vania Thomas (Top 10)	2011: Esonica Veira (Top 15)	Competed as Virgin Islands from 1976 to 1980; as American Virgin Islands from 1982 to 2005; has been competing as US Virgin Islands since 2010. Won Miss World Caribbean in 1989; Miss World Talent in 2005.
Uzbekistan	2013	2013	Miss Uzbekistan	0				
