= Miss World Switzerland =

Beauty pageant

- Formation: 1952
- Type: Beauty pageant
- Headquarters: Bern
- Location: Switzerland
- Members: Miss World
- Official language: German
- National Director: Veeranda Aeberli
- Website: Official website

Miss World Switzerland is a Beauty pageant in Switzerland for Miss World pageant.

== History ==
Switzerland debut at Miss World pageant was in 1952 by the Miss Switzerland Organization. In 2005 is the last participation of the pageant to send the official representative at the Miss World pageant. In 2006–2012, Switzerland absent at Miss World pageant, due to problem in license, nobody took the license before.

In 2013, developed by new organization of Miss World Switzerland, Veeranda Aeberli is the national director of Miss World Switzerland and She organized a National pageant in 2013 "Miss World Switzerland " The return of Switzerland to Miss World. The pageant focused to organize the official pageant for Miss World who focused in the mission Beauty with a Purpose. Since that year, Miss World Switzerland became the national franchise holder of Miss World in Switzerland.

== Titleholders ==
The winner of Miss World Switzerland represents her country at Miss World. On occasion, when the winner does not qualify (due to age) for either contest, a runner-up is sent. Before, the winner was selected or handpicked in another local pageant in the country.

Color key

- Declared as Winner
- Ended as runner-up
- Ended as one of the finalists or semi-finalists

Year	Miss World Switzerland	Hometown	Placement at Miss World	Special Awards
1951	Jacqueline Genton	Lausanne	Did not compete	
1952	Sylvia Müller	Zürich	1st Runner-up	
1953	Odette Michel Conue	Zürich	Unplaced	
1954	Claudine Chaperon Du Larret	Lausanne	Unplaced	
1955	Claude Ivry	Lausanne	Did not compete	
1956	Yolande Daetwyler	Zürich	Unplaced	
1957	Yvonne Bridel	-	Did not compete	
Did not compete between 1958-1959
1960	Eliane Maurath	Geneva	Did not compete	
Did not compete between 1961-1965
1966	Janine Söllner	Bern	Unplaced	
1967	Edith Fraefel	Bern	Unplaced	
1968	Jeannette Biffiger	Zürich	Unplaced	
1969	Liselotte Pauli	Brugg	Did not compete	
1970	Sylvia Christina Weisser	Bern	Unplaced	
1971	Patrice Söllner	Bern	Unplaced	
1972	Astrid Vollenweider	Bern	Unplaced	
1973	Magda Lepori	Bern	Unplaced	
1974	Astrid Maria Angst	Bern	Unplaced	
1975	Franziska "Franzi" Angst	Bern	Unplaced	
1976	Ruth Crottet	Bern	Unplaced	
1977	Daniela Häberli	Zürich	Top 15	
1978	Jeanette Keller	Zürich	6th Runner-up	
1979	Barbara Meyer	Zürich	4th Runner-up	
1980	Jeannette Linkenheil	Zürich	Unplaced	
1981	Margit Kilchoer	Bern	Unplaced	
1982	Lolita Laure Morena	Geneva	3rd Runner-up	
1983	Patricia Lang	Zürich	Unplaced	
1984	Silvia Anna Affolter	Zürich	Top 15	
1985	Eveline Nicole Glanzmann	Zürich	6th Runner-up	
1986	Renate Walther	Bargen	Unplaced	
1987	Gabriela Bigler	Bern	Unplaced	
1988	Karina Berger	Zürich	Unplaced	
1989	Catherine Mesot	Wil	Unplaced	
1990	Priscilla Leimgruber	Bulle	Unplaced	
1991	Sandra Aegerter	Aigle	Unplaced	
1992	Valerie Bovard	La Tour-de-Peilz	Unplaced	
1993	Patricia Fässler	Zürich	Unplaced	
1994	Sarah Briguet	Lausanne	Unplaced	
1995	Stephanie Berger	Zürich	Unplaced	
1996	Melanie Winiger	Zürich	Unplaced	
1997	Tanja Gutmann	Zürich	Unplaced	
1998	Sonja Grandjean	Zürich	Unplaced	
1999	Anita Buri	Zürich	Unplaced	
2000	Mahara Brigitta McKay	Aarau	Unplaced	
2001	Mascha Santschi	Bern	Unplaced	
2002	Nadine Vinzens	Chur	Did not compete	
2003	Bianca Nicole Sissing	Lucerne	Top 20	1st Runner-up Miss World Beach Beauty
2004	Fiona Hefti	Zürich	Unplaced	
2005	Lauriane Gilliéron	Lausanne	Unplaced	
Did not compete in 2006
2007	Amanda Ammann	Lausanne	Did not compete	
Did not compete between 2008-2012
2013	Cindy Williner	Zürich	Unplaced	
2014	Dijana Cvijetić	St. Gallen	Unplaced	
Did not compete in 2015
2016	Amber Chavaillaz	Lausanne	Did not compete	
Did not compete between 2017—2025

== See also ==
- Miss Switzerland
