= Miss World 1955 =

5th Miss World pageant

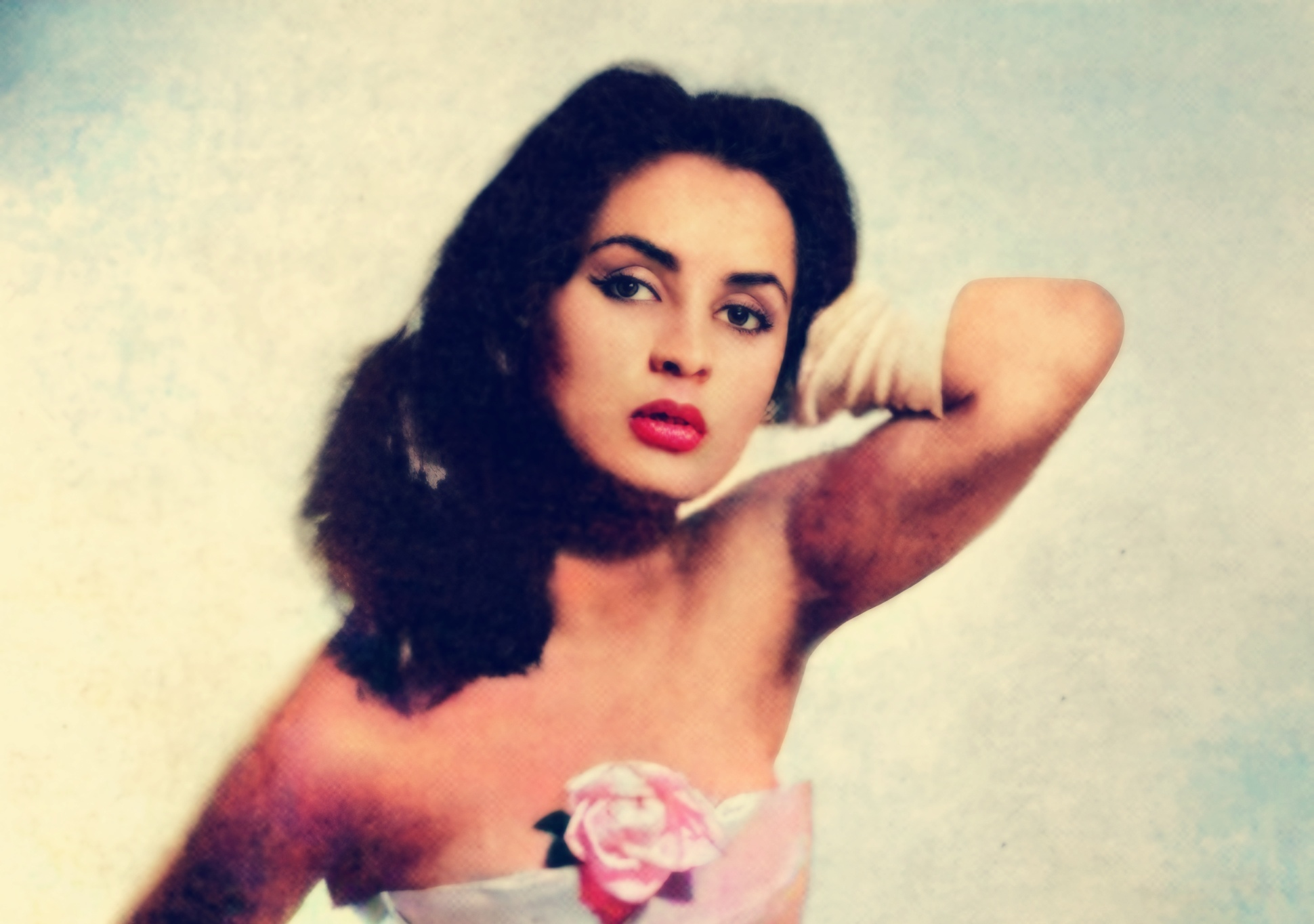
- Susana Duijm
- Date: 20 October 1955
- Presenters: Eric Morley
- Venue: Lyceum Ballroom, London, United Kingdom
- Entrants: 21
- Placements: 8
- Debuts: Australia; Austria; Cuba; Honduras; Iceland; Venezuela
- Withdrawals: Egypt; Switzerland; Turkey
- Returns: Israel; Monte-Carlo
- Winner: Susana Duijm; Venezuela

Miss World 1955 was the 5th edition of the Miss World pageant, held at the Lyceum Ballroom in London, United Kingdom, on 20 October 1955.

At the conclusion of the event, English actress Eunice Gayson crowned Susana Duijm of Venezuela as Miss World 1955. This is the first victory of Venezuela in the history of the pageant. Miss World 1954, Antigone Costanda of Egypt, did not attend the pageant, due to hostilities between Egypt and the United Kingdom over the Suez Canal.

Contestants from twenty-one countries participated in this year's pageant. The pageant was hosted by Eric Morley.

== Background ==
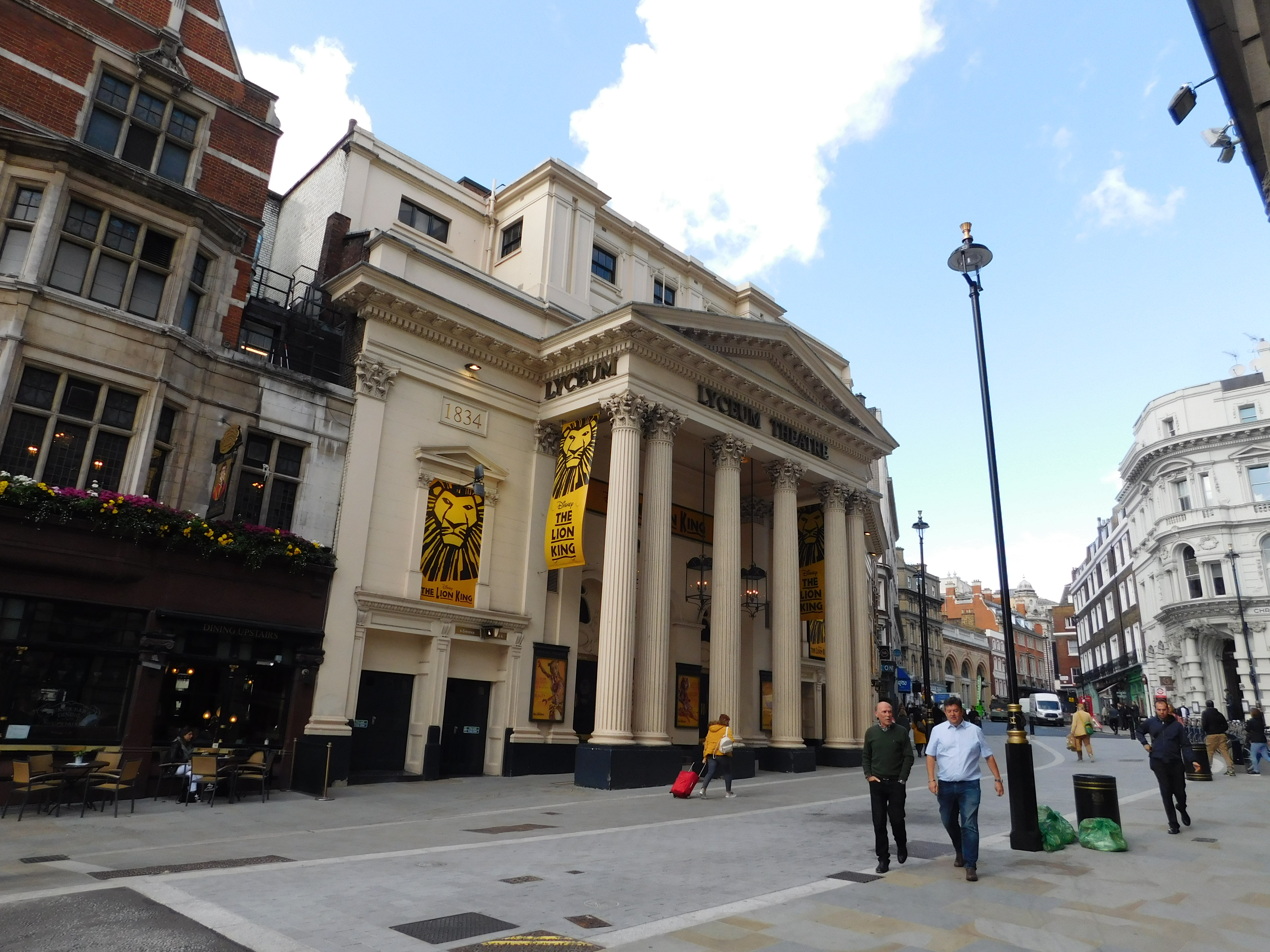
Lyceum Ballroom, venue of Miss World 1955

=== Selection of participants ===
Twenty-one contestants were selected to compete in the pageant. Two contestants were appointed to represent their countries after being a runner-up in their national pageants.

==== Replacements ====
The first runner-up of Miss Suomi 1955, Mirva Arvinen, was appointed to represent Finland after Miss Suomi 1955, Inga-Britt Soderberg, won Miss Europe.

With the withdrawal of the original Miss Australia 1955, Shirley Bliss, two candidates were chosen to represent Australia at Miss World: Miss Victoria, Beverley Prowse of Melbourne, and Miss South Australia, Pat Doran of Adelaide. To choose who would compete in Miss World, a London newspaper held a poll for its readers, and the readers chose Prowse as the Australian representative to Miss World.

==== Debuts, returns and withdrawals ====
This edition marked the debut of Australia, Austria, Cuba, Honduras, Iceland and Venezuela, and the returns of Israel and Monte-Carlo, which last competed in 1953. Iolanda Cristina Gigliotti of Egypt withdrew due to the dispute between the United Kingdom and Egypt over the Suez Canal. Switzerland and Turkey withdrew after their respective organizations failed to hold a national competition or appoint a delegate.

Lorna McLeod of Alaska and Barbara Mamo Vieira of Hawaii were supposed to participate in this edition. However, they were unable to participate due to financial issues.

== Results ==
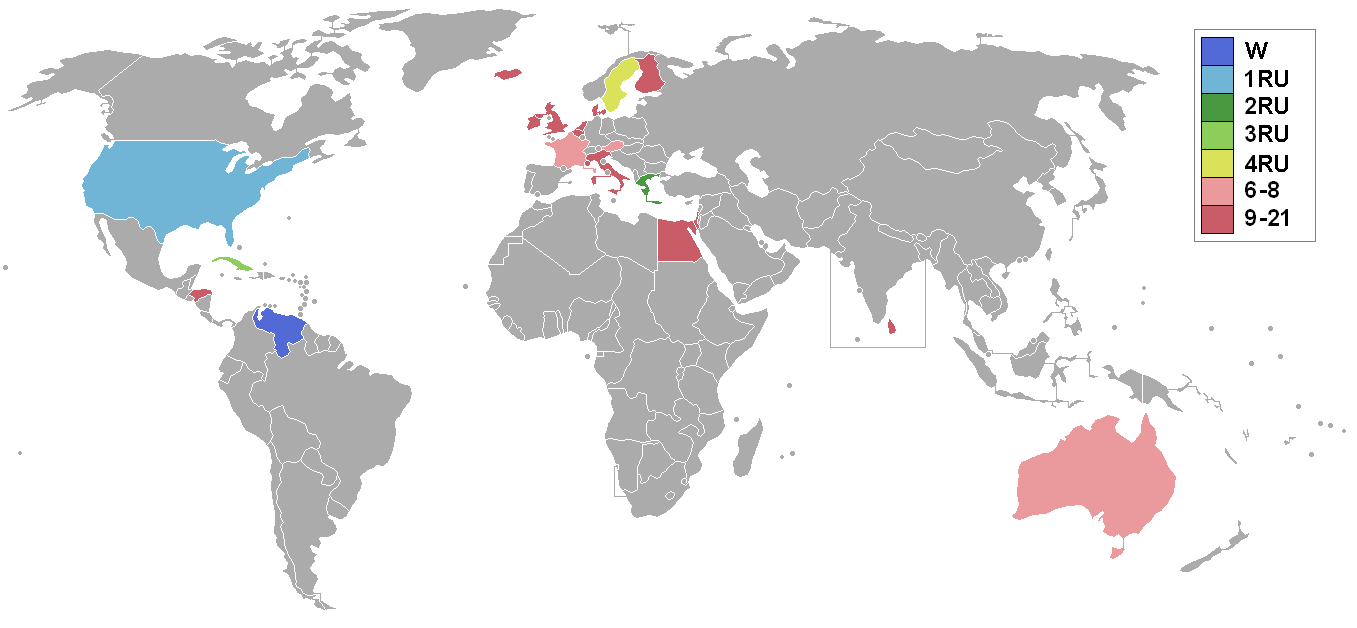
Miss World 1952 participating countries and territories

| Placement | Contestant |
|---|---|
| Miss World 1955 | Venezuela – Susana Duijm |
| 1st runner-up | United States – Margaret Anne Haywood |
| 2nd runner-up | Greece – Julia Koumoundourou |
| 3rd runner-up | Cuba – Gilda Marín |
| 4th runner-up | Sweden – Anita Åstrand |
| 5th runner-up | France – Gisele Thierry |
| Top 8 | Australia – Beverly Prowse; Austria – Felicitas Göbel |

== Contestants ==
Twenty-one contestants competed for the title.

| Country | Contestant | Age (Note: Age at the time of the pageant) | Hometown |
|---|---|---|---|
| Australia | Beverly Prowse | 23 | Melbourne |
| Austria | Felicitas Göbel | 24 | Vienna |
| Belgium | Rosette Ghislain | 22 | Hainaut |
| Ceylon | Viola Sita Gunarate | 22 | Colombo |
| Cuba | Gilda Marín | 26 | Havana |
| Denmark | Karin Rasmussen | 18 | Copenhagen |
| Finland | Mirva Arvinen | 19 | Helsinki |
| France | Gisele Thierry | 21 | Paris |
| Greece | Julia Koumoundourou | 18 | Icaria |
| Holland | Angelina Kalkhoven | 18 | Amsterdam |
| Honduras | Pastora Pagán | 18 | San Pedro Sula |
| Iceland | Arna Hjörleifsdóttir | 22 | Akureyri |
| Ireland | Evelyn Foley | 22 | Dublin |
| Israel | Miriam Kotler | 21 | Tel Aviv |
| Italy | Franca Incorvaia | 18 | Milan |
| Monte Carlo | Josette Travers | 16 | Monte Carlo |
| Sweden | Anita Åstrand | 21 | Alingsas |
| United Kingdom (Note: Competed as Great Britain in the pageant) | Jennifer Chimes | 22 | Leamington Spa |
| United States | Margaret Anne Haywood | 20 | Jonesboro |
| Venezuela | Susana Duijm | 19 | Aragua de Barcelona |
| West Germany | Heidi Krüger | 18 | Berlin |
