= Marina Papaelia =

Egyptian model

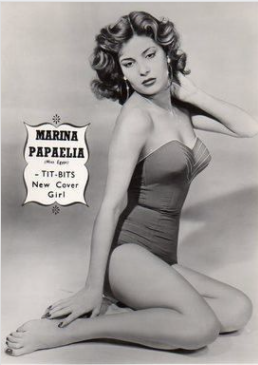
Marina Papaelia

Myshimarina (Marina) Papaelia (Greek: Μαρίνα Παπαηλία, born c. 1931) was the first runner-up of Miss Egypt 1953. Papelia was sent to represent Egypt at Miss World 1953 when the winner, Antigone Costanda was unable to participate in the pageant. Papaelia finished at third place.

According to Eric Morley's 1967 book, The Miss World Story, when Costanda won the Miss World pageant the following year, she claimed her victory was also a victory for Papaelia.
