= Herbie Goes to Monte Carlo =

1977 film by Vincent McEveety

- Theatrical release poster
- Directed by: Vincent McEveety
- Written by: Arthur Alsberg; Don Nelson
- Based on: Characters by Gordon Buford
- Produced by: Ron Miller
- Starring: Dean Jones; Don Knotts; Julie Sommars
- Cinematography: Leonard J. South
- Edited by: Cotton Warburton
- Music by: Frank De Vol
- Production company: Walt Disney Productions
- Distributed by: Buena Vista Distribution
- Release date: June 24, 1977
- Running time: 105 minutes
- Country: United States
- Language: English
- Box office: $29 million

Herbie Goes to Monte Carlo is a 1977 American sports adventure comedy film directed by Vincent McEveety and written by Arthur Alsberg and Don Nelson. The film is the third installment in the Herbie film series and the sequel to Herbie Rides Again (1974). In the film, Dean Jones returns as champion race car driver Jim Douglas (reprising his role from The Love Bug, the first film in the series), as he and Herbie, his sentient Volkswagen Beetle race car, come out of retirement. The two are joined this time by somewhat cynical and eccentric riding mechanic Wheely Applegate (Don Knotts). The film follows Douglas, Herbie and Applegate as they participate in the fictional Trans-France Race, a road race from Paris, France, to Monte Carlo, Monaco.

Herbie Goes to Monte Carlo received mixed reviews from critics and earned $29 million in the US and Canada during its initial theatrical run. It was followed by a third sequel titled Herbie Goes Bananas (1980).

== Plot ==
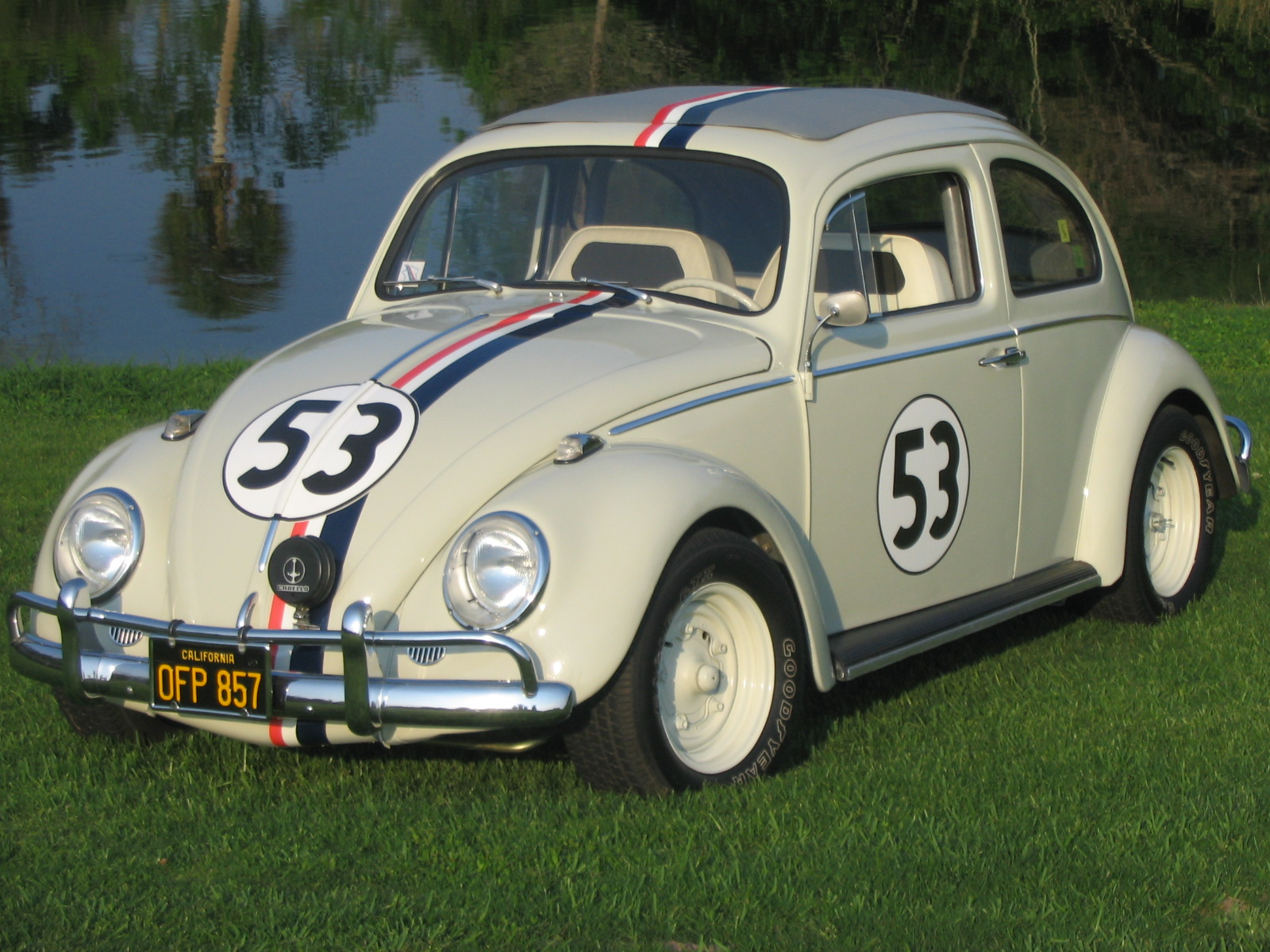
Original car used during filming of Herbie Goes to Monte Carlo

Jim Douglas, his partner and mechanic Wheely Applegate, and Herbie arrive in Paris to qualify for and compete in the Trans-France Race (a fictional version of the Monte Carlo Rally), in the hopes of staging a career comeback. The team has three major opponents in the race: Bruno von Stickle, a German driver with experience in the "European Racing Circuit", Claude Gilbert, a French driver, and Diane Darcy, a beautiful young woman and the only female driver in the Trans-France Race.

Herbie falls in love at first sight with Giselle, Diane's sentient Lancia Scorpion. Diane initially hates Jim for what was apparently his, but actually was Herbie's knee-jerk behavior that ruin her chances of succeeding during the first qualifying rounds, as strong-willed Diane does not appear to believe in any cars that can be alive and have a mind of their own. Herbie and Giselle go on a 'date' together, and the following day, both cars qualify successfully for the race, Herbie performing donuts across the line in a bid to impress Giselle.

Meanwhile, two diamond thieves, Max and Quincy, steal the famous Étoile de Joie (French for "Star of Joy") diamond and hide it in Herbie's fuel tank in order to avoid being captured by a swarm of searching policemen. They attempt to steal Herbie to retrieve the diamond, but Herbie causes them to blow every chance they get. The pair even threaten Jim and Wheely at gunpoint, an encounter from which Herbie manages to escape by driving through a gypsy camp and a building site. Wheely assumes Diane hired the two goons to knock them out of the race, causing a misunderstanding between Jim and Diane. Herbie is also taken into protection by the French police, headed by inspector Bouchet and his eager junior officer Fontenoy, causing them to miss the start of the race the following day. Giselle also refuses to start the race without Herbie, much to Diane's exasperation, but does so after Wheely lies to Giselle that Herbie has broken up with her. When Fontenoy eventually arrives with Herbie, Wheely also lies to Herbie that Giselle did the same to persuade Herbie to start the race, albeit from last place.

After numerous setbacks and delays, including another run in with the thieves, Herbie, Jim and Wheely race back into contention. After Diane and Giselle crash into a lake, Herbie turns around and charges back to save them, after Jim reveals Wheely had lied to him. After being rescued by Herbie and Jim, Diane's attitude toward Jim softens, and Diane begins to understand that cars can have minds of their own. Herbie refuses to restart because of being determined to stay with Giselle, but Diane encourages Herbie not to relent in the quest for victory in the Trans-France Race, but not before Herbie makes Wheely get down on his knees and apologize for lying to him. With Diane (As well as Gilbert) now out of the race, the three pursue Bruno through the streets of Monte Carlo, leading to a thrilling duel for the win. Herbie takes the lead by driving upside down on the tunnel roof of the Monaco Grand Prix circuit, and Jim drives Herbie to victory.

After the race, it is revealed that Bouchet, also known as "Double X" as a code name to the thieves, is the real mastermind behind the museum robbery, though the motive of his scheme is revealed as he also threatens Jim and Wheely at gunpoint, only to be foiled by Herbie rolling onto his foot and knocking the gun out of his hands with his hood. Fontenoy, having unraveled the mystery of the Étoile de Joie, has Bouchet clapped in handcuffs and arrested.

In the end, Jim and Diane begin to date, as do Wheely and the Monte Carlo trophy girl. Herbie and Giselle fall in love again as well, and celebrate Herbie's victory by watching a brilliant firework display over the Monte Carlo harbor.

== Cast ==
- Dean Jones as Jim Douglas
- Don Knotts as "Wheely" Applegate
- Julie Sommars as Diane Darcy, the women's lib activist
- Jacques Marin as Inspector Bouchet / "Double X"
- Roy Kinnear as Quincey
- Bernard Fox as Max
- Eric Braeden as Bruno Von Stickle, the German racer who makes put downs about Herbie
- Xavier Saint-Macary as Detective Fontenoy
- François Lalande as Monsieur Ribeaux, The Owner of The Museum "Étoile de Joie" Diamond
- Alan Caillou as Emile, The Chief Monaco Official
- Laurie Main as Duval, The Museum Guard
- Mike Kulcsar as Claude Gilbert
- Johnny Haymer as Race Official
- Stanley Brock as Taxi Driver
- Gérard Jugnot as The Waiter
- Jean-Marie Proslier as Doorman
- Tom McCorry as Showroom M.C.
- Lloyd Nelson as The Mechanic
- Jean-Jacques Moreau as Truck Driver
- Yveline Brière as Girl Friend
- Sébastien Floche as French Tourist
- Madeleine Damien as Old Woman
- Alain Janey as Man At Café
- Raoul Defosse as Police Captain
- Ed Marcus as Exhibit M.C.
- Richard Warlock, Gerald Brutsche, Kevin Johnston, Bob Harris, Carey Loftin, Jesse Wayne, Bill Erickson as The Drivers
- Katia Tchenko as Monte Carlo Trophy Girl (uncredited)
- Josiane Balasko as Woman In The Crowd (uncredited)
- André Penvern as French Policeman (uncredited)

== Trans-France race cars ==
The film prominently features numerous exotic European sports cars from the era. Notably, 17 vehicles are shown on the starting grid prior to the race, deviating from the officially stated 16. If Herbie had been included, the total would have reached 18. The 18 qualified vehicles are as follows:

- Volkswagen Beetle (Herbie): white, red and blue stripes on hood, black number 53 in a circle.
- Lancia Scorpion (Giselle): powder blue, yellow and white stripes, dark blue or black number 7
- Laser 917 GT Coupé: (Porsche 917 - styled Volkswagen Beetle based kit car): red, black and yellow stripes, yellow number 17 on a black square background
- DeTomaso Pantera: black, white stripes, black number 66 on a white circle
- Ferrari 365 GTC/4: silver (sometimes dark grey), black number 22
- Maserati Indy: dark blue, black number 70 on an off-white square
- Ferrari Daytona: red and yellow stripes, black number 44 on a yellow circle
- BMW E9 2800 CS: powder blue, white, Elf oil decals, black number 8 in oval
- BMW 2002ti: white, red trim, black number 120
- Porsche 911: white, blue trim, yellow number 190 in a blue square
- Porsche 911: dark green, black number 91 on a yellow square
- Lancia Stratos Stradale: black, yellow wheels, Squale Diffusion decals on hood, white number 34
- Lancia Stratos: red, white trim, gold wheels, white stripes, black number 4 in a white circle
- Renault Alpine A310: white, red stripes and lower body, Esso and Aseptogyl decals, black number 2
- Renault Alpine A310: black, black number 116 in a white square
- DeTomaso Pantera: dark green, yellow trim on front fenders, black number 10 in a white square
- Matra Bagheera: white, black number 75
- Ford Capri MK1: yellow, black hood, car number unknown

Vehicles featured during the qualifying rounds, some of which also appeared in the race, were filmed concurrently with race footage at Laguna Seca, California:

- Fiat Dino Coupé: red, black number 5
- Alfa Romeo Giulia Tubolare Zagato: red, green nose
- DeTomaso Pantera: brown, black number 1 in a white square
- Chevrolet Corvair: white, dark blue stripes, black number 33
- Datsun 240Z: white, black arrow on hood, red and yellow trim, black number 35
- Datsun 280Z: blue, car number unknown
- Lancia Fulvia Zagato: red, black number 16 in a white circle
- DeTomaso Pantera: red, black number 30 on a white square
- Porsche 356 Convertible: orange, black roll cage, red trim, red number 54
- Ferrari 250 S Berlinetta Vignale: red, car number unknown
- Ferrari Dino 246 GT: black, black number 67 in a white square, amber blinkers
- Lotus Elan S3: gold, black roof, black number 118
- Triumph GT6: dark blue or black, Leyland and Bell Helmets logos on hood; car number unknown
- Porsche 911: silver, black number 6 and DP on doors
- Ferrari Daytona: grey, black number 31
- Porsche 911: yellow, black number 99
- Lamborghini Miura P400S: red, black number 60 on hood
- Lamborghini 400 GT: black, car number unknown

While these vehicles were featured in the film, they did not explicitly compete in the Trans-France Race. Their appearances were predominantly confined to the practice and qualifying sequences, which were filmed at Mazda Raceway Laguna Seca in Monterey, California, in 1976.

== Promotion ==
=== Mann's Chinese Theatre ===
On July 11, 1977, Herbie joined other immortals of the silver screen when he placed his wheel-prints in cement in the forecourt of Mann's Chinese Theatre in Hollywood, California; the ceremony was also attended by the film's stars Dean Jones, Don Knotts and Julie Sommars, as well as several hundred guests and tourists. Mayor of Los Angeles Tom Bradley sent a proclamation officially declaring July 11 as "Herbie Goes to Monte Carlo Day" and a floral wreath was presented to Herbie by Miss Monte Carlo. The ceremony was preceded by a parade on Hollywood Boulevard featuring a traditional Chinese band, firecrackers, 25 Lancia sports cars, clowns, cheerleaders and the Goodyear Blimp. Afterwards, a special invitational screening of Herbie Goes to Monte Carlo was held inside the Chinese Theatre, which was celebrating its 50th anniversary that year.

=== Novelization ===
Two different paperback novelizations of the film were published to coincide with the film's release: the US version was written by Vic Crume and published by Scholastic Paperbacks in June 1977; the UK version was written by John Harvey and published by New English Library for the film's UK release in 1978.

=== Comic book ===
A comic book of Herbie Goes to Monte Carlo (illustrated by Dan Spiegle) was featured in Walt Disney Showcase #41 published by Gold Key Comics.

== Reception ==
The film holds a 60% rating on Rotten Tomatoes based on 10 reviews, with an average rating of 5.11/10. On Metacritic the film has a weighted average score of 38 out of 100, based on 4 critics, indicating "generally unfavorable" reviews.

== Home media ==
Herbie Goes to Monte Carlo was released by Walt Disney Home Video through VHS and Betamax in November 1984, and was later re-released on November 6, 1985. It was first released on DVD in Region 1 on May 4, 2004, and was re-released as a 2-DVD double feature set along with Herbie Rides Again on April 26, 2009.

On September 2, 2012, Herbie Goes to Monte Carlo was re-released on DVD as part of Herbie: 4-Movie Collection with The Love Bug, Herbie Rides Again and Herbie Goes Bananas.

On June 30, 2015, Herbie Goes to Monte Carlo was released on Blu-ray as a Disney Movie Club exclusive title.
