= Miss Venezuela 1955 =

3rd edition of the Miss Venezuela competition

- Date: July 9, 1955
- Venue: Tamanaco Intercontinental Hotel, Caracas, Venezuela
- Entrants: 11
- Placements: 3
- Winner: Susana Duijm; Miranda

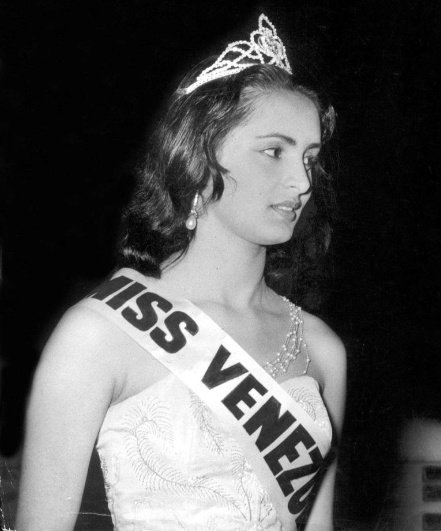
Miss Venezuela 1955 titleholder

Miss Venezuela 1955 was the third edition of Miss Venezuela pageant held at Tamanaco Intercontinental Hotel in Caracas, Venezuela, on July 9, 1955. The winner of the pageant was Susana Duijm, Miss Miranda, who competed in Miss World 1955 and won the crown.

== Results ==
=== Placements ===
- Miss Venezuela 1955 - Susana Duijm (Miss Miranda)
- 1st runner-up - Ivonne Cisneros (Miss Bolívar)
- 2nd runner-up - Mireya Casas (Miss Distrito Federal)

== Contestants ==
Contestants were the following and including two sisters, Mireya and Elena Casas Robles:

- Miss Bolívar - Ivonne Cisneros Barceló
- Miss Distrito Federal - Mireya Casas Robles
- Miss Mérida - Cecilia Useche Sardi
- Miss Miranda - Susana Duijm Zubillaga
- Miss Monagas - Helena Quilart Navarro
- Miss Nueva Esparta - Elka Pérez Hernández
- Miss Portuguesa - Mary González
- Miss Sucre - Teresa Estrella Villaroel
- Miss Trujillo - Elena Casas Robles
- Miss Yaracuy - Chelo Avellaneda Valery
- Miss Zulia - Magaly Dupuy Ortega
