= Miss Maroc =

Beauty pageant

Miss Universe Morocco Organization
- Formation: 1953; 73 years ago
- Type: Beauty pageant
- Headquarters: Casablanca
- Location: Morocco
- Members: Miss Universe; Miss World; Miss International
- Official language: French
- National director: Saad Bennani
- Website: https://missuniversemorocco.com/en/

The Miss Morocco (previously called as Miss Maroc) is a national beauty pageant that selects the representative of Morocco for the Miss Universe, Miss World and Miss International competition.

== History ==
The Miss Morocco Contest is the oldest continuing beauty contest in Morocco. The contest was first broadcast on television in 1959, with the number of viewers peaking in the nineties when it became watched by nearly half a billion people around the world. The competition qualifies for the Miss Universe election but the country has yet to return to the Miss Universe pageant. Night Star Maroc is currently the owner of the "Miss Maroc" trademark. In 2021 the new formation of Miss Universe Morocco was created in Casablanca. The winner expected to be at Miss Universe 2021.

=== Franchise holders ===
The first known Miss Maroc representing the newly independent nation of Morocco in 1956 was Lydia Marin who competed in Miss World that same year. In 1953, nine women were selected to compete in a contest to determine the Miss Maroc that would represent Morocco at Miss Universe, an annual international beauty pageant that is run by the American-based Miss Universe Organization. In 1955, a Miss Maroc was crowned and sent to Miss France 1956 back when Morocco was still a French protectorate and thus, still a part of France. Between the 1950s (after independence) and the 1970s, Morocco sent delegates to major international pageants such as Miss Universe, Miss World, and Miss International pageants. Jacqueline Dorella Bonilla, named Miss Morocco in 1957, was one of the most famous Moroccan competitors to ever make it to the American beauty contest, ending up as one of the top 15 semifinalists in the competition. In 2021 Morocco set to return at Miss Universe under new directorship, Saad Bennani.

== Titleholders ==
Year	Miss Maroc
1936	Aimée Gervais
1953	Colette Ribes
1955	Gisèle Charbit
1956	Lydia Marin
1957	Jacqueline Dorella Bonilla
1958	Jocelyne Lambin
1959	Raymonde Valle
1960	Marilyne Escobar
1961	Irene Gorsse
1962	Ginette Buenaventes
1963	Selma Rahal
1964	Leila Gourmala
1965	Lucette Garcia
1966	Joelle Lesage
1967	Naïma Benjelloun
1968	Zakia Chamouch
1969	Rahima Hachti
1975	Salhi Badia
1978	Majida Tazi
2002	Doja Lahlou
2006	Iman Albani
2012	Sarah Mouatamid
2015	Fatima Ezzahra El-Horre
2016	Sara Belkiz
2018	Rania Aaït
2021	Fatima-Zahra Khayat

== Titleholders under Miss Maroc org. ==
=== Miss Universe Morocco ===
- : Declared as Winner
- : Ended as runner-up or top 5/6 qualification
- : Ended as one of the finalists or semifinalists
- : Ended as special awards winner

the main winner of Miss Maroc represents Morocco at Miss Universe pageant. On occasion, when the winner does not qualify (due to age) for either contest, a runner-up is sent.

Year	Region	Miss Morocco	Placement at Miss Universe	Special Award(s)	Notes
2026	Casablanca	Sara Allali	Did not compete		
Did not compete since 2022—2025
2021	Marrakesh-Safi	Kawtar Benhalima	Unplaced		Saad Bonnani directorship; Replacement — The original winner Fatima-Zahra Khayat did not compete at Miss Universe, due to accident matter, a runner-up Kawtar Benhalima took the title and went to Miss Universe 2021.
Did not compete between 2013—2020
2012	Casablanca-Settat	Sarah Mouatamid	Did not compete		Night Star Maroc directorship; Withdrew — Due to franchise matter, Sarah withdrew at Miss Universe 2012.
Did not compete between 1979—2011
1978	Rabat-Salé-Kénitra	Majida Tazi	Unplaced		
Did not compete between 1976—1977
1975	Rabat-Salé-Kénitra	Salhi Badia	Unplaced		
Did not compete between 1967—1974
1966	Rabat-Salé-Kénitra	Joelle Lesage	Unplaced		
Did not compete between 1964—1965
1963	Rabat-Salé-Kénitra	Selma Rahal	Unplaced		
1962	Rabat-Salé-Kénitra	Ginette Buenaventes	Unplaced		
1961	Rabat-Salé-Kénitra	Irene Gorsse	Unplaced		
1960	Rabat-Salé-Kénitra	Marilyne Escobar	Unplaced		
Did not compete between 1958—1959
1957	Casablanca	Jacqueline Dorella Bonilla	Top 15		
Did not compete between 1954—1956
1953	Casablanca	Colette Ribes	Did not compete		Miss Maroc Organization directorship.

=== Miss World Morocco ===
- : Declared as Winner
- : Ended as runner-up or top 5/6 qualification
- : Ended as one of the finalists or semifinalists
- : Ended as special awards winner

the main winner of Miss Maroc represents Morocco at Miss World pageant. On occasion, when the winner does not qualify (due to age) for either contest, a runner-up is sent.

Year	Region	Miss Morocco	Placement at Miss World	Special Award(s)	Notes
2026	Casablanca	Chirihan Chergui	Unplaced		
Did not compete in 2025
2023	Marrakesh-Safi	Sonia Aït Mansour	Unplaced		
Did not compete between 1979—2022
1978	Tangier-Tétouan-Al Hoceima	María Teresa Rodriguez	Did not compete		
Did not compete between 1970—1977
1969	Casablanca-Settat	Rahima Hachti	Did not compete		Supposed to compete in Miss World, but her sponsors from Morocco decided to send her to Miss Maja International 1969 in Spain instead
1968	Rabat-Salé-Kénitra	Zakia Chamouch	Unplaced		
1967	Rabat-Salé-Kénitra	Naïma Benjelloun	Unplaced		
1966	Fez-Meknes	Naïma Naim	Unplaced		
1965	Tangier-Tétouan-Al Hoceima	Lucette García	Unplaced		
1964	Oriental	Leila Gourmala	Unplaced		
Did not compete between 1959—1963
1958	Béni Mellal-Khénifra	Jocelyne Lambin	Unplaced		
1957	Casablanca-Settat	Danielle Müller	Unplaced		
1956	Casablanca-Settat	Lydia Marín	Unplaced		Miss Maroc Organization directorship.
