= Miss World 1956 =

6th Miss World pageant

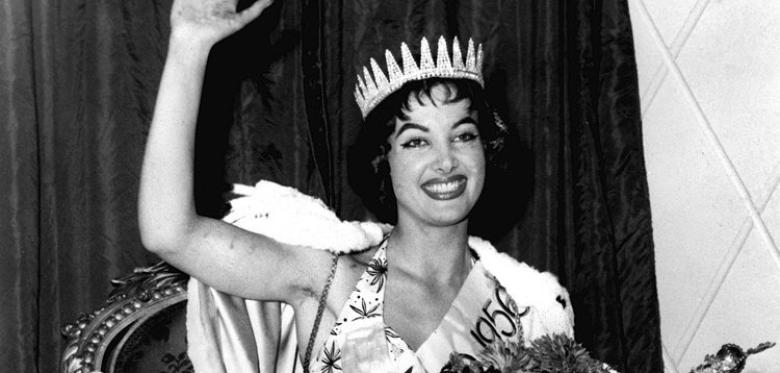
- Petra Schürmann
- Date: 15 October 1956
- Presenters: Eric Morley
- Venue: Lyceum Ballroom, London, United Kingdom
- Entrants: 24
- Placements: 6
- Debuts: Japan; Morocco; New Zealand; South Africa; Tunisia
- Withdrawals: Australia; Ceylon; Cuba; Honduras; Monte Carlo
- Returns: Egypt; Switzerland; Turkey
- Winner: Petra Schürmann; West Germany

Miss World 1956 was the 6th edition of the Miss World pageant, held at the Lyceum Ballroom in London, United Kingdom, on 15 October 1956.

At the conclusion of the event, Susana Duijm of Venezuela crowned Petra Schürmann of West Germany as Miss World 1956. This is the first victory of West Germany in the history of the pageant.

The announcement of the winner led to some confusion during the ceremony. Initially, Betty Lane Cherry of the United States was mistakenly announced as the winner when she received the winner's sash. However, it was later clarified that she was the first runner-up. In response to the mix-up, she stated, "Two seconds don't make one first."

Contestants from twenty-four countries participated in this year's pageant. The pageant was hosted by Eric Morley.

== Background ==
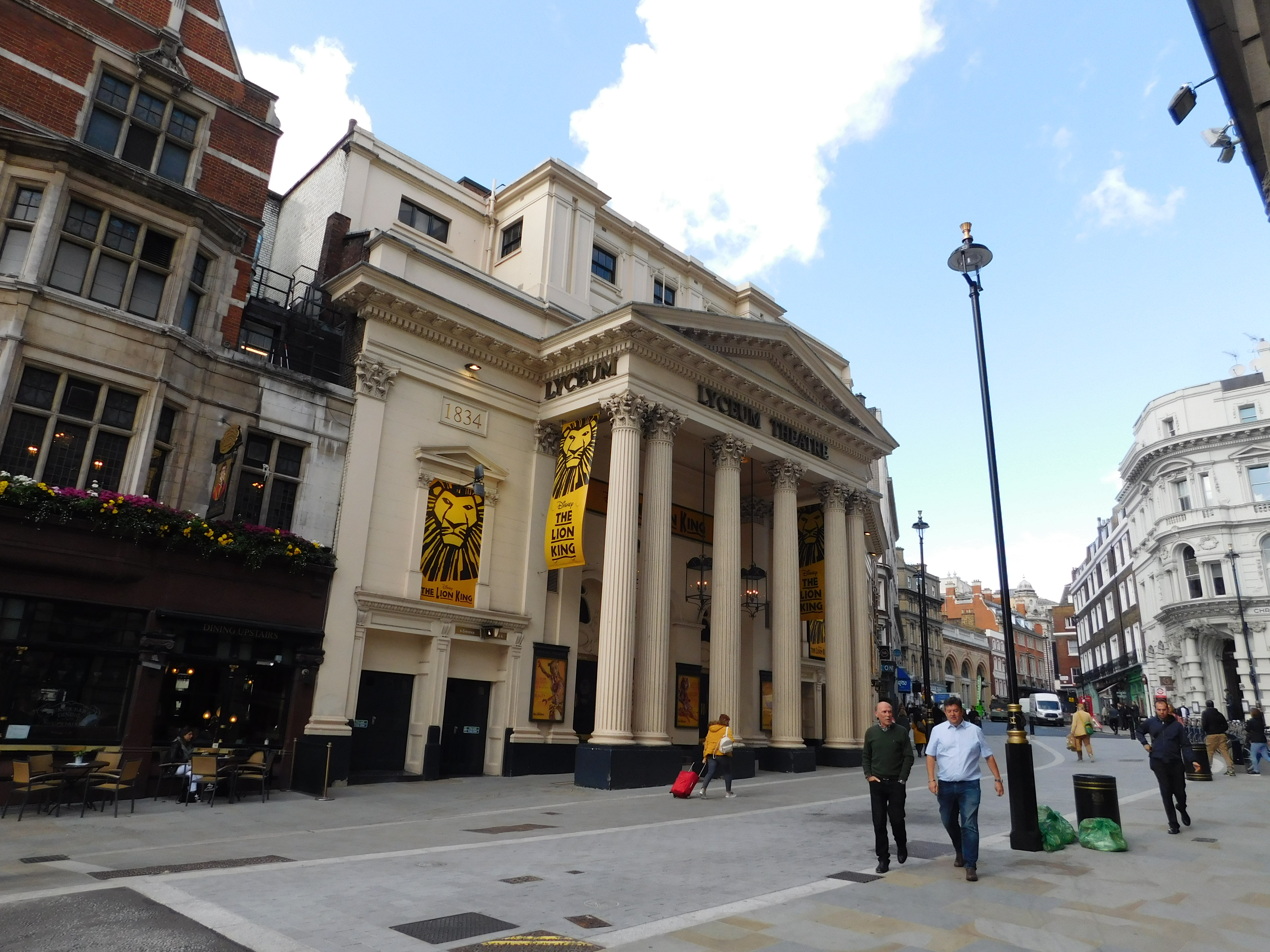
Lyceum Ballroom, venue of Miss World 1956

=== Selection of participants ===
Twenty-four contestants were selected to compete in the pageant.

==== Debuts, returns and withdrawals ====
This edition marked the debut of Japan, Morocco, New Zealand, South Africa and Tunisia, and the returns of Egypt, Switzerland and Turkey, which last competed in 1954.

Maureen Kistle of Australia withdrew after deciding to make her trip to London in December, leaving her without the financial support to return in October before her national title was awarded. As a result, Eric Morley sent a letter to Australian newspapers seeking a replacement for Kistle, but none emerged. Marcia Rodríguez of Cuba did not participate for undisclosed reasons. Ceylon, Honduras, and Monte-Carlo withdrew after their respective organizations failed to hold a national competition or appoint a delegate.

Marthe Niankoury of Côte d'Ivoire was supposed to participate, but she was unable to do so due to visa problems. Leda Brandão Rau of Brazil and Dorothy Moreau of Canada were also supposed to participate. However, they were unable to do so due to budget constraints. Lola Sabogal of Peru was also invited to compete, but she did not compete for undisclosed reasons.

== Results ==
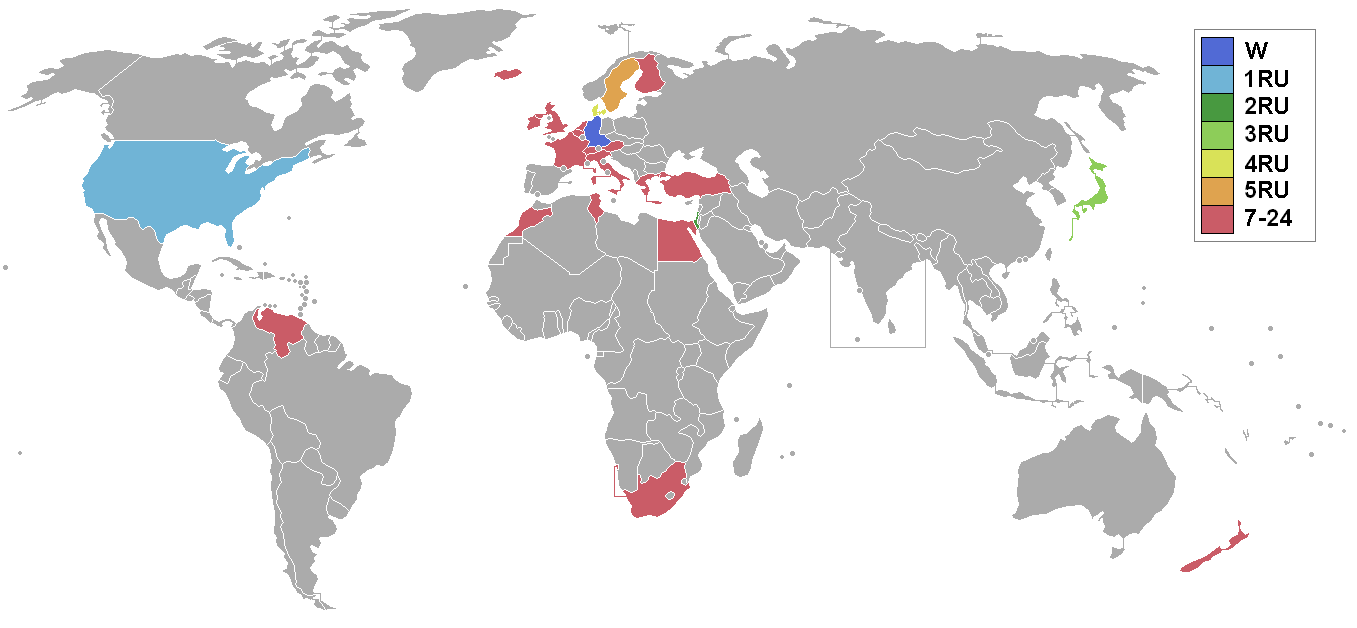
Miss World 1956 participating countries and territories

The finalists of Miss World 1956

=== Placements ===
Placement	Contestant
Miss World 1956	West Germany – Petra Schürmann
1st runner-up	United States – Betty Lane Cherry
2nd runner-up	Israel – Rina Weiss
3rd runner-up	Japan – Midoriko Tokura
4th runner-up	Denmark – Anne Rye Nielsen
5th runner-up	Sweden – Eva Bränn

== Contestants ==
Twenty-four contestants competed for the title.

Country	Contestant	Age (Note: Age at the time of the pageant)	Hometown
Austria	Margaret Scherz	22	Vienna
Belgium	Madeleine Hotelet	25	Brussels
Denmark	Anne Rye Nielsen	19	Frederiksberg
Egypt	Norma Dugo	17	Cairo
Finland	Sirpa Helena Koivu	18	Turku
France	Geneviève Solare	20	Paris
Greece	Maria Passaloglou	19	Athens
Holland	Ans van Pothoven	18	Amsterdam
Iceland	Ágústa Guðmundsdóttir	19	Reykjavík
Ireland	Amy Kelly	22	Dublin
Israel	Rina Weiss	19	Tel Aviv
Italy	Angela Portaluri	19	Maglie
Japan	Midoriko Tokura	20	Yamaguchi
Morocco	Lydia Marin	19	Rabat
New Zealand	Jeanette de Montalk	20	Whangārei
South Africa	Norma Vorster	19	Natal
Sweden	Eva Bränn	20	Timrå
Switzerland	Yolanda Daetwyler	20	Zürich
Tunisia	Pascaline Agnes	20	Tunis
Turkey	Suna Özekin	20	Istanbul
United Kingdom (Note: Competed as Great Britain in the pageant)	Iris Alice Kathleen Waller	21	Gateshead
United States	Betty Lane Cherry	20	Orangeburg
Venezuela	Celsa Pieri	18	Carúpano
West Germany	Petra Schürmann	23	Mönchengladbach
