= Miss Monaco =

Beauty pageant

Miss Monaco or Miss Monte Carlo is a national beauty pageant for unmarried women in Monaco. The pageant was held several times in the 1950s, with the 1953 winner, Elizabeth Chovisky, Participating in Miss World 1953. In intervening years, contestant winners went on to compete in various unofficial Europe-wide contests. Not all winners are documented.

In 2015 the preselection of contestants for the new edition of the Miss Monaco beauty pageant has started.

== Winners ==
The results of the "unofficial" Miss Europe pageant, also known as the Miss Europa pageant, are poorly documented, But Miss Monaco placed in some years. The Miss Europa pageant was organized by the Comité Officiel et International Miss Europe, and the Mondial Events Organisation, which ran the official Miss Europe pageant until 2002, filed suit against the organization in 2000 over the pageant name.

Year	Miss Monaco	Placement	Notes
1953	Elizabeth Chovisky		Competed at Miss World and Miss Europe as Miss Monte Carlo
1955	Josette Travers		
1973	Veronique Mercier	2nd Runner-up unofficial Miss Europe (Miss Europa) 1973	
1974	Dany Coutelier	3rd Runner-up Unofficial Miss Europe (Miss Europa) 1974	
1976	Danielle Payan	4th Runner-up, Unofficial Miss Europe (Miss Europa) 1976	
2014	Hannah Mathews		
