= Miss St. Barthelemy =

Beauty pageant

Miss Saint Barthelemy
- Formation: 2011
- Type: Beauty pageant
- Headquarters: Gustavia
- Location: Saint Barthélemy
- Members: Miss World
- Official language: French

Miss St. Barthélemy or Miss Saint Barthélemy is a national beauty pageant in Saint Barthélemy.

== History ==
In 2011, Johanna Sansano was the first Miss World contestant to represent Saint Barthélemy.

== Titleholders ==
Color key

- Declared as Winner
- Ended as runner-up
- Ended as one of the finalists or semifinalists

Year	Miss Saint Barthelemy	Placement	Special Awards
Did not compete between 2012 - present
2011	Johanna Sansano	Top 20	Top 20 at Miss World Beach Beauty; Top 11 at Miss World Talent
