= Miss Andorra =

Beauty pageant

- Formation: 2003
- Type: Beauty pageant
- Headquarters: Andorra la Vella
- Location: Andorra
- Members: Miss World; Miss Europe
- Official language: Catalan

Miss Andorra is a national Beauty pageant in Andorra.

== History ==
Miss Andorra competed at the Miss World 2003, supported by the Andorra Tourism Organisation. Andorra has not competed at the Miss Europe contest since 2003. Since 2006, Miss Andorra has not been organised due to lack financial support.

== Titleholders ==
Year	Miss Andorra
2003	María José Girol Juménez
2005	Lourdes Fernández
2006	Raquel Rueda

== Andorra at International pageants ==
=== Miss Universe Andorra ===
- : Declared as the winner
- : Finished as a runner-up or top 5/6 qualifier
- : Finished as one of the finalists or semifinalists
- : Finished as a special awards winner

Year	Miss Universe Andorra	Placement at Miss Universe	Special Awards	Notes
Did not compete between 2006—2024
2005	Lourdes Fernández Simón	Did not compete		
2004	María José Girol Juménez	Did not compete		

=== Miss World Andorra ===
- : Declared as the winner
- : Finished as a runner-up or top 5/6 qualifier
- : Finished as one of the finalists or semifinalists
- : Finished as aspecial awards winner

Year	Miss World Andorra	Placement at Miss World	Special Awards	Notes
Did not compete between 2006—2025
2005	Lourdes Fernández Simón	Did not compete		
Did not compete in 2004
2003	María José Girol Juménez	Unplaced		

== See also ==
- Miss World
- Miss Europe
