= Denise Perrier =

French actress and Miss World 1953 (born 1935)

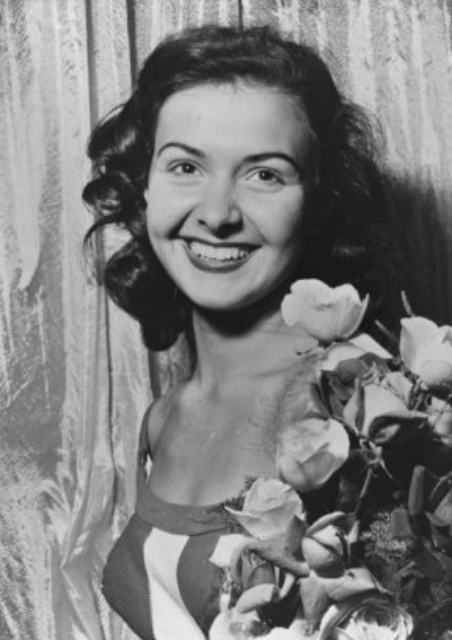
- Denise Perrier in 1953
- Born: Denise Margaret Perrier; 13 February 1935 (age 91); Ambérieu-en-Bugey, France
- Occupations: Model; Actress
- Beauty pageant titleholder
- Title: Miss World 1953
- Years active: 1954-1971
- Major competitions: Miss World 1953 (Winner)

Denise Perrier (born February 13, 1935) is a French actress, former model and beauty queen who won Miss World 1953. She now goes by "Denise Perrier Lanfranchi." She remains the only French woman to have won the Miss World title.

== Biography ==
Denise Perrier was born and grew up in the French town Ambérieu-en-Bugey. Her father was a gendarme. Her family moved to French Indochina and returned to France before the 1954 Geneva Conference. When she was 18 years old, the director of the casino of Saint-Raphaël invited her to compete in the Miss Saint-Raphaël beauty pageant contest that was taking place the same night. She won the contest and moved on to participate to the Miss France contest.

Denise Perrier was crowned Miss France World 1953 by Miss France World 1952, Nicole Drouin. She represented France in the Miss World 1953 pageant. Perrier was the chosen as Miss World during that year's pageant, representing France, the same year that Christiane Martel of France also won the Miss Universe pageant. She was the first French woman to win this title. She met Julia Morley and they became close friends.

Perrier has also acted in films. Her most memorable scene is an uncredited appearance in the 1971 James Bond film, Diamonds Are Forever. In the scene, after a little persuasion from James Bond, who starts throttling her with the top of her bikini, she gives up and reveals the location of the villain of the film. She has stated she asked Sean Connery to go a little rough on her to make the strangling look more believable, and he complied.

After leaving her modelling career, Perrier became active in local government in her native France. She held three municipal mandates in the list of Jacques Médecin, then the Mayor of Nice.

She was one of the judges at the 2005, 2010, 2011 and 2013 Miss World contests.

== Filmography ==
- Toutes folles de lui (1967)
- The Blonde from Peking (1967) - La speakerine
- Le Bourgeois gentil mec (1969)
- Diamonds Are Forever (1971) - Marie (uncredited)

Awards and achievements
Preceded by (Sweden) May-Louise Flodin	Miss World; 1953	Succeeded by (Egypt) Antigone Costanda
