= Antigone Costanda =

Cypriot-Egyptian model and Miss World 1954 (born 1934)

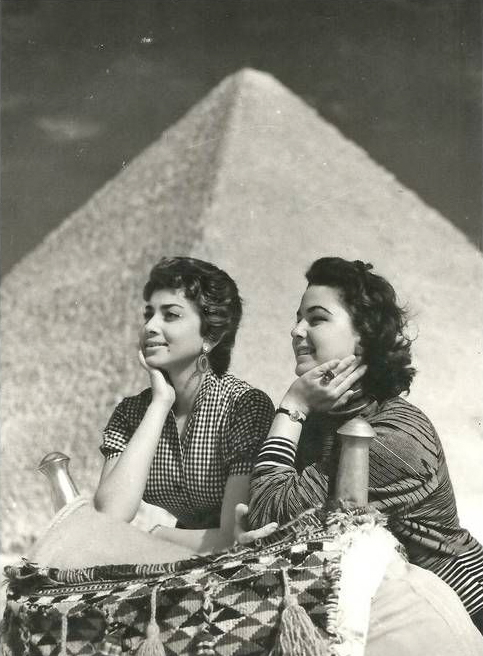
- Costanda (right) in 1955
- Born: 1934 (age 91–92); Nicosia, Cyprus
- Occupations: Model, entrepreneur
- Beauty pageant titleholder
- Title: Miss Egypt 1954; Miss World 1954
- Years active: 1953–present
- Major competitions: Miss Egypt 1954 (Winner); Miss World 1954 (Winner)

Antigone Costanda (Arabic: أنتيجون كوستان, Greek: Αντιγόνη Κωνσταντά; born 1934) is a Cypriot-Egyptian designer, model and beauty queen who won Miss World 1954. The pageant took place on October 18, 1954, in London, England, with the participation of 16 contestants. Born in Nicosia, Cyprus, in addition to Arabic, Costanda is fluent in Greek, English, Italian and French. The Cypriot-Egyptian beauty was the first Miss Egypt candidate to win the title of Miss World for Egypt, as well as the title of Miss World for an African country. She was also the first African to win a major beauty pageant title.

According to Eric Morley's 1967 book, "The Miss World Story", Costanda was positively beaming as she claimed that her victory was also for the Miss World 1953 second runner-up status of Marina Papaelia, also from Egypt.

The following year, during the 1955 Miss World beauty pageant held in London, Costanda did not attend the event because of political hostilities between Egypt and Britain over the Suez Canal. British actress Eunice Gayson crowned Miss Venezuela, Susana Duijm, as the new Miss World.

Prior to winning Miss World, Costanda was gaining experience in the modelling profession and was appearing in numerous publications. Winning Miss World further helped her to reach the top of her profession, becoming a successful model in the Middle East, France, Italy and Greece. Her career in later years moved into interior design. She ran a company designing the interior of business buildings. She was one of the judges at the Miss Egypt 2006 contest.

Awards and achievements
Preceded by (France) Denise Perrier	Miss World; 1954	Succeeded by (Venezuela) Susana Duijm
