= Susana Duijm =

Venezuelan actress, TV host, and Miss World 1955 (1936-2016)

- Born: Carmen Susana Duijm Zubillaga; August 11, 1936; Aragua de Barcelona, Anzoátegui, Venezuela
- Died: June 18, 2016 (aged 79); Nueva Esparta, Venezuela
- Other name: Susana Duijm
- Height: 5 ft 8.5 in (1.74 m)
- Beauty pageant titleholder
- Title: Miss Venezuela 1955
- Hair color: Black
- Eye color: Brown
- Major competitions: Miss Venezuela 1955 (Winner); Miss Universe 1955 (Top 15); Miss World 1955 (Winner)

Carmen Susana Duijm Zubillaga (August 11, 1936 – June 18, 2016) was a Venezuelan actress, tv host, model and beauty queen who was crowned Miss Venezuela 1955 and competed at Miss Universe 1955, placing in the top 15. She then went to compete at Miss World 1955 and won, becoming the first Venezuelan and Hispanic/Latin American woman to win the Miss World crown.

== Miss Universe ==
Before competing in Miss World, Duijm was a semi-finalist at Miss Universe 1955.

== Miss World ==
She won the 1955 Miss World pageant, representing Venezuela. The pageant was held in London, United Kingdom.

== Life after pageants ==
Her success as a beauty queen led to a career as an actress and a presenter on Venezuelan television. The "Reina Pepiada" arepa is named in her honor. She lived in Margarita Island, Venezuela until her death in 2016.

Her daughter Carolina Cerruti was the official representative of Venezuela to the 1983 Miss World pageant held in London, on November 17, 1983.

Awards and achievements
Preceded by (Egypt) Antigone Costanda	Miss World; 1955	Succeeded by (Germany) Petra Schürmann
Preceded by Gisela Bolaños	Miss Venezuela; 1955	Succeeded by Blanca Heredia
Preceded by —	Miss World Venezuela; 1955	Succeeded by Celsa Pieri
Preceded by Carmen Elena Álvarez	Miss Miranda; 1955	Succeeded by Aracelis Mora
