= Miss World 1954 =

4th Miss World pageant

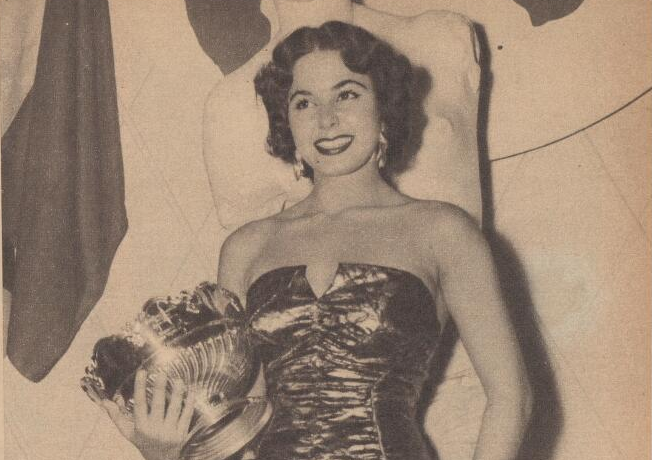
- Antigone Costanda
- Date: 18 October 1954
- Presenters: Eric Morley
- Venue: Lyceum Ballroom, London, United Kingdom
- Entrants: 16
- Placements: 6
- Debuts: Belgium; Italy; Turkey
- Withdrawals: Israel; Monte Carlo; Norway
- Returns: Ireland
- Winner: Antigone Costanda; Egypt

Miss World 1954 was the 4th edition of the Miss World pageant, held at the Lyceum Ballroom in London, United Kingdom, on 18 October 1954.

At the end of the event, Antigone Costanda of Egypt was announced as Miss World 1954. This is the first and so far, only victory of Egypt in the history of the pageant. Miss World 1953, Denise Perrier of France, attended the pageant.

Contestants from sixteen countries participated in this year's pageant. The pageant was hosted by Eric Morley.

== Background ==
=== Selection of participants ===
Sixteen contestants were selected to compete in the pageant. Two contestants were appointed to represent their countries after being a runner-up in their national pageants.

==== Replacements ====
Cristina Fanton, the first runner-up of Miss Italy 1954, was appointed to represent Italy after Miss Italy 1954, Eugenia Bonino, was involved in an accident. The second runner-up of Miss France 1954, Claudine Bleuse, was appointed to represent France after Miss France 1954, Monique Lambert, chose not to fly to London to compete in Miss World.

==== Debuts, returns, and withdrawals ====
This edition marked the debut of Belgium, Italy and Turkey, and the return of Ireland, which last competed in 1952. Malka Rozenblat of Israel withdrew after Israeli organizers discovered that she was married. Although married contestants were allowed to compete at this time, Israel did not allow married titleholders to represent their country internationally. Mona Stornes of Norway withdrew after choosing to get married in the United States. Monte-Carlo withdrew from the competition after its respective organization failed to hold a national competition or appoint a delegate.

== Results ==
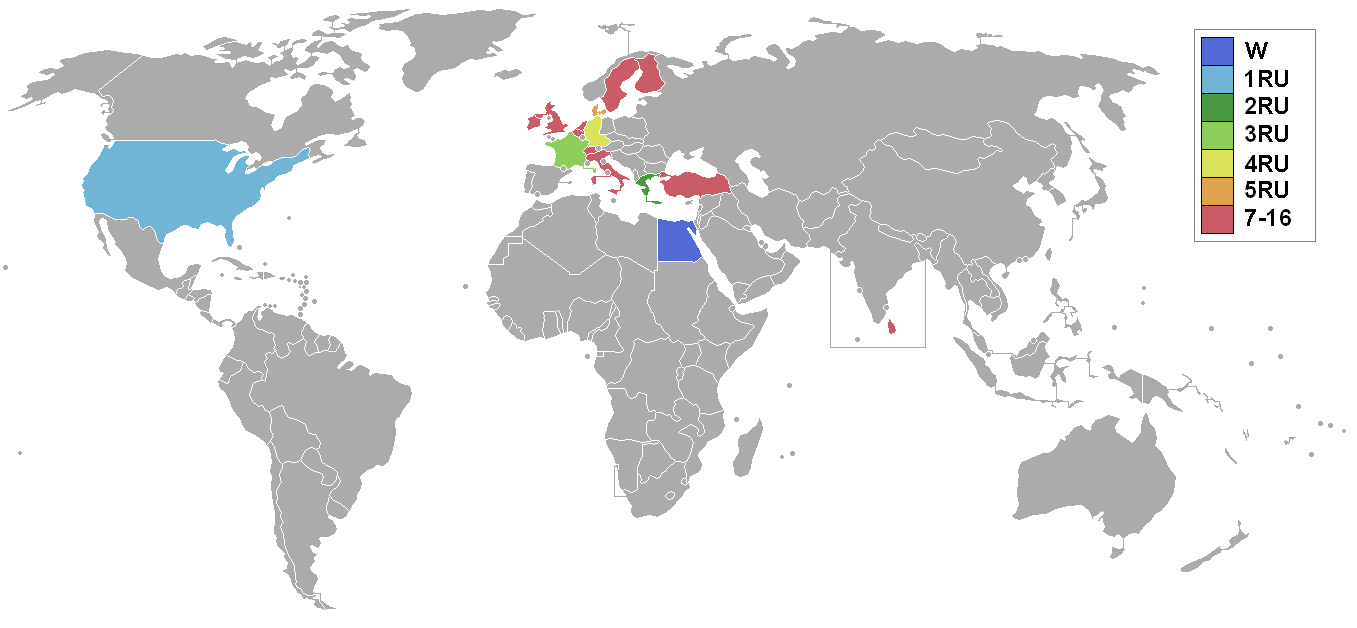
Miss World 1954 participating nations and results

Placement	Contestant
Miss World 1954	Egypt – Antigone Costanda
1st Runner-Up	United States – Karin Hultman
2nd Runner-Up	Greece – Efi Mela
3rd Runner-Up	France – Claudine Bleuse
4th Runner-Up	West Germany – Frauke Walther
5th Runner-Up	Denmark – Grete Hoffenblad

== Contestants ==
Sixteen contestants competed for the title.

Country	Contestant	Age (Note: Age at the time of the pageant)	Hometown
Belgium	Nelly Dehem	19	Brussels
Ceylon	Jeannette de Jonk	20	Colombo
Denmark	Grete Hoffenblad	17	Rødovre
Egypt	Antigone Costanda	21	Alexandria
Finland	Yvonne de Bruyn	19	Helsinki
France	Claudine Bleuse	16	Villeconin
Greece	Efi Mela	21	Athens
Ireland	Connie Rodgers	24	Dublin
Italy	Cristina Fantonni	17	Modena
Netherlands (Note: Competed as Holland in the pageant)	Conny Harteveld	22	Leiden
Sweden	Margareta Westling	19	Stockholm
Switzerland	Claudine Bühler	20	Lausanne
Turkey	Sibel Göksel	18	Istanbul
United Kingdom (Note: Competed as Great Britain in the pageant)	Patricia Butler	23	Hoylake
United States	Karin Hultman	22	Rochester
West Germany	Frauke Walther	19	Düsseldorf
