= Miss World 1953 =

3rd Miss World pageant

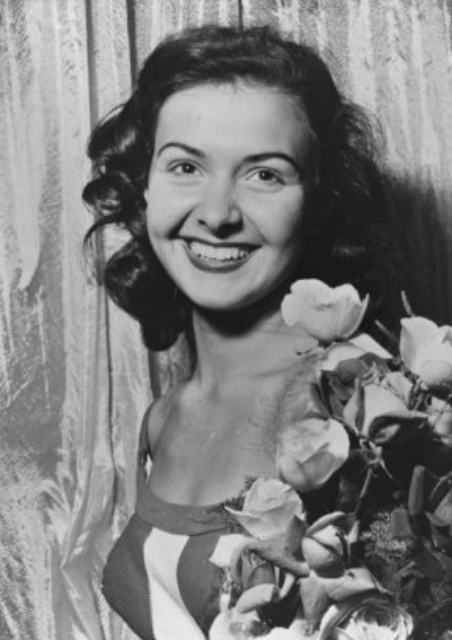
- Denise Perrier
- Date: 19 October 1953
- Presenters: Eric Morley
- Venue: Lyceum Ballroom, London, United Kingdom
- Entrants: 15
- Placements: 5
- Debuts: Ceylon; Egypt; Greece; Israel; Monte Carlo; Norway
- Withdrawals: Ireland
- Winner: Denise Perrier; France

Miss World 1953 was the 3rd edition of the Miss World pageant, held at the Lyceum Ballroom in London, United Kingdom, on 19 October 1953.

At the conclusion of the event, Denise Perrier of France was announced as Miss World 1953. This is the first and so far, only victory of France in the history of the pageant. Perrier was also the first Miss World winner to wear a Miss World sash.

Contestants from fifteen countries participated in this year's pageant. The pageant was hosted by Eric Morley.

== Background ==
=== Selection of participants ===
Fifteen contestants were selected to compete in the pageant. One contestant was appointed to represent her country after being a runner-up in her national pageant, while one contestant was appointed to replace the original winner.

==== Replacements ====
Miss Egypt 1953, Antigone Costanda supposedly competed in this edition. However, due to undisclosed reasons, she was replaced by her first runner-up, Marina Papaelia. Costanda eventually competed in the following edition and won, where she dedicated her win to Papelia by shouting "Viva, viva, Marina Papaelia".

Since Miss France 1953, Sylviane Carpentier chose not compete in Miss World and Miss Universe to get married, two separate pageants were selected to send French representatives to Miss World and Miss Universe. The Miss Cinémonde pageant was in charge of selecting the French representative to Miss Universe, while the organizers of the French Committee of Elegance was in charge of selecting the French representative of Miss World. Denise Perrier was eventually chosen as the representative of France to Miss World, while Christiane Martel was chosen as the representative of France to Miss Universe. Both won their respective international pageants.

==== Debuts and withdrawals ====
This edition marked the debuts of Ceylon, Egypt, Greece, Israel, Monte Carlo, and Norway. Mary Murphy of Ireland withdrew after failing to arrive in London, despite being expected, due to illness that occurred shortly before her planned travel to the contest.

Sepia Degehet of Belgium supposedly competed in the pageant, but withdrew due to the controversy her predecessor Anne-Marie Pauwels made in the pageant. She was only sent to Miss Europe that year. Marcella Mariani of Italy supposedly competed as well, but withdrew in order to focus on her acting career. Lore Felger of Austria and Leyla Saroufin of Lebanon also supposedly competed, but withdrew due to lack of sponsors.

== Results ==
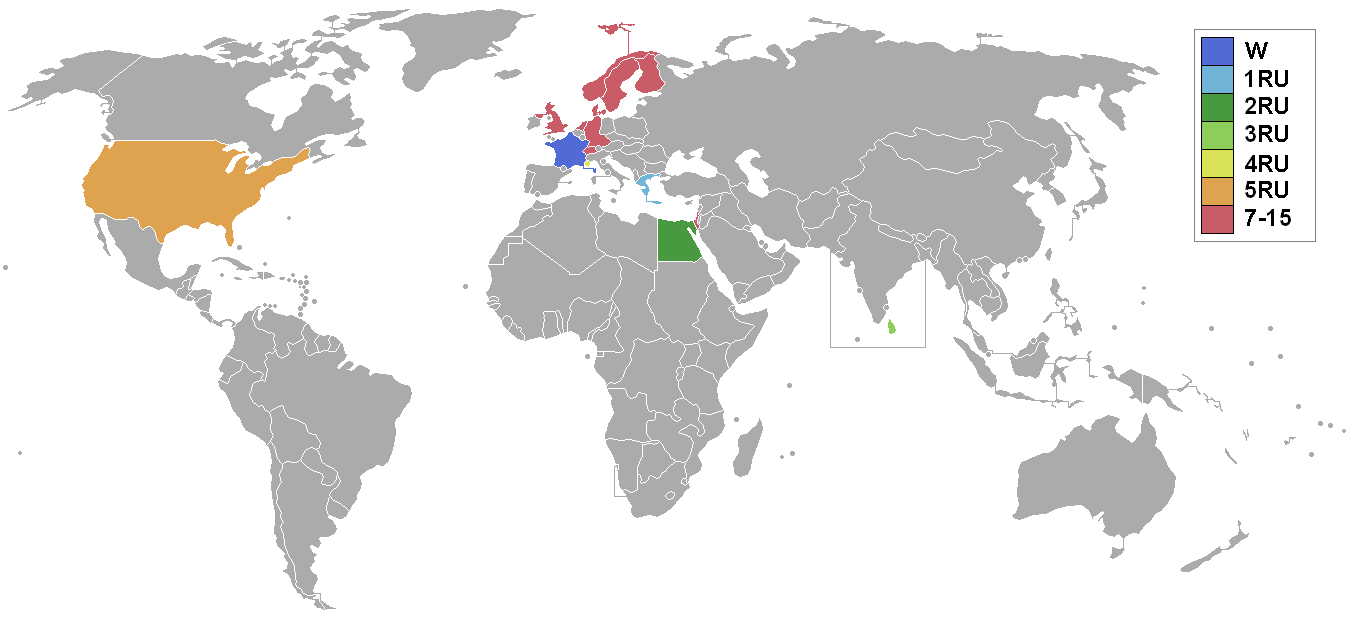
Miss World 1953 participating countries

=== Placements ===
Placement	Contestant
Miss World 1953	France – Denise Perrier
1st Runner-Up	Greece – Alexandra Ladikou
2nd Runner-Up	Egypt – Marina Papaelia
3rd Runner-Up	Ceylon – Manel Illangakoon
4th Runner-Up	United States – Mary Kemp Griffin

== Contestants ==
Fifteen contestants competed for the title.

Country	Contestant	Age (Note: Age at the time of the pageant)	Hometown
Ceylon	Manel Illangkoon	20	Colombo
Denmark	Ingrid Andersen	21	Copenhagen
Egypt	Marina Papaelia	20	Cairo
Finland	Maija-Riitta Tuomaala	19	Helsinki
France	Denise Perrier	18	Ambérieu-en-Bugey
Greece	Alexandra Ladikou	20	Kavala
Israel	Havatzelet Dror	19	Tel-Aviv
Monaco (Note: Competed as Monte Carlo in the pageant)	Elizabeth Chovisky	18	Monte Carlo
Netherlands (Note: Competed as Holland in the pageant)	Yvonne Meijer	20	Haarlem
Norway	Synnøve Gulbrandsen	23	Oslo
Sweden	Ingrid Johansson	18	Stockholm
Switzerland	Odette Michel Conue	19	Zürich
United Kingdom (Note: Competed as Great Britain in the pageant)	Brenda Mee	20	Derby
United States	Mary Kemp Griffin	23	Los Angeles
West Germany	Wilma Kanders	20	Düsseldorf
