= Eric Morley =

English businessman

- Born: Eric Douglas Morley; 26 September 1918; Holborn, London, England
- Died: 9 November 2000 (aged 82); London, England
- Resting place: West Norwood Cemetery
- Education: Whitstable Grammar School
- Occupation: Founder of the Miss World Organization
- Spouse: Julia Morley (m. 1960)
- Children: 5

Eric Douglas Morley (26 September 1918 – 9 November 2000) was an English television host and the founder of the Miss World pageant and Come Dancing programme. His widow, Julia Morley, is now head of the pageant and his son, Steve Douglas, is one of its presenters.

== Life and career ==
Morley was born in Holborn, London, England. He said that his father "was at Oxford and spoke nine languages" but he died young. He attended Whitstable Grammar School in Kent. London County Council sent him to the Royal Navy training ship HMS Exmouth, which was moored at Grays. Here, he broke bars of chocolate to sell to his peers. He joined the Royal Fusiliers at 14 and played french horn in the band. During the war he became a captain in the Royal Army Service Corps, organising entertainment for the troops and fighting in Dunkirk.

=== Mecca ===
Morley started his career in the entertainment business in 1945 when he resigned his commission to manage a travelling show in Scotland. In 1949, he introduced ballroom dancing onto BBC television through the Come Dancing programme, encouraging viewers to visit Mecca's dance halls.

Morley had adapted the seaside beauty contest into fashion shows at Mecca dance halls; he developed this into a national beauty pageant and a TV concept. 'Miss Festival of Britain' began in 1951 as a promotional tool for Mecca and once international contestants arrived in London for the event, the press dubbed it 'Miss World', initially holding the competitions in Mecca halls. The first competition coincided with the Festival of Britain.

In 1952, he was Mecca's general manager of dancing, and was made a director in 1953. With Mecca, Morley helped to popularise bingo which was played at Mecca venues throughout the United Kingdom. He changed the company from a small catering and dancing firm into a leading entertainment and catering company in the UK. It employed 15,000 people and covered dance halls, catering, bingo, gambling, ice-skating rinks, bowling alleys, discos and several restaurants. The company also provided catering and entertainment services for several of the biggest football clubs in London; Arsenal, Chelsea and Tottenham Hotspur.

In 1978, he left Mecca after a disagreement with the then parent company, Grand Metropolitan, becoming chairman of the Belhaven Brewery company in Scotland.

=== Miss World ===
When an American rival Miss Universe contest was launched, Morley turned Miss World into an annual event held every November, initially at the Mecca owned Lyceum Theatre and later in the Royal Albert Hall. It was first televised in 1959, and became a popular fixture with Morley's announcement of: "I shall announce the results in reverse order".

In 1970, flour bombs were thrown at the compere, Bob Hope, by protestors. The competition raised more than £30 million for charity. In 1983 he floated Miss World Group on the Unlisted Securities Market of the London Stock Exchange, keeping a 51 per cent stake. Although the terrestrial TV channels no longer broadcast the show in Britain, it remains popular worldwide, and in 1997 was capable of attracting a TV audience of 2.5 billion across 155 countries.

The competition—and its related events such as Miss United Kingdom, Miss England and Miss Scotland—could generate great earnings and Morley controversially acted as agent to the winners, keeping them under tight supervision. On one occasion (Miss World 1973), he dethroned the winner, who he thought had acted improperly. At the Miss World 1979, Venezuelan contestant Tatiana Capote popped out of her swimsuit during a preview of the final judging. Morley hastily adjusted her swimsuit.

=== Charity ===
He supported both the Variety Club of Great Britain and Variety Clubs International, the former as Chief Barker in 1973, and the latter as president in 1978. Prior to becoming Chief Barker, he had raised over $700,000 for the Variety Club.

=== Politics ===
Morley was a confirmed supporter of Margaret Thatcher, and also had political ambitions of his own. He stood for the Conservatives twice in Dulwich, in the general elections of October 1974 and 1979, and the second time lost by only 122 votes.

== Personal life ==
Morley had married his wife Julia in 1960 after meeting at a dance hall. In 1968, she took over the day-to-day running of Miss World and, following Morley's death in 2000, became chairman of the pageant. His family are now beneficiaries of the Dancing with the Stars franchise globally.

== Death ==
On 9 November 2000, the day after the contestants first paraded at the Millennium Dome in preparation for the 2000 Miss World finals, he had a heart attack and died in the Princess Grace Hospital, west London. A service of thanksgiving was held in the Guards Chapel, Wellington Barracks, with the Prince of Wales and the Duke of Edinburgh being represented. He left an estate valued at £10.6 million, and was buried in West Norwood Cemetery, London.

== Portrayal on screen ==
Morley is portrayed by Rhys Ifans in the 2020 British comedy-drama film Misbehaviour, about the feminist protest at Miss World 1970, and by Neil Pearson in the Jimmy Savile television drama The Reckoning (2023).
