= List of Miss World runners-up and finalists =

This article provides the names of the runners-up in the Miss World pageant since the pageant's first edition in 1951 and Continental Queens since Miss World 1981.

== Table of Miss World runners-up and finalists ==
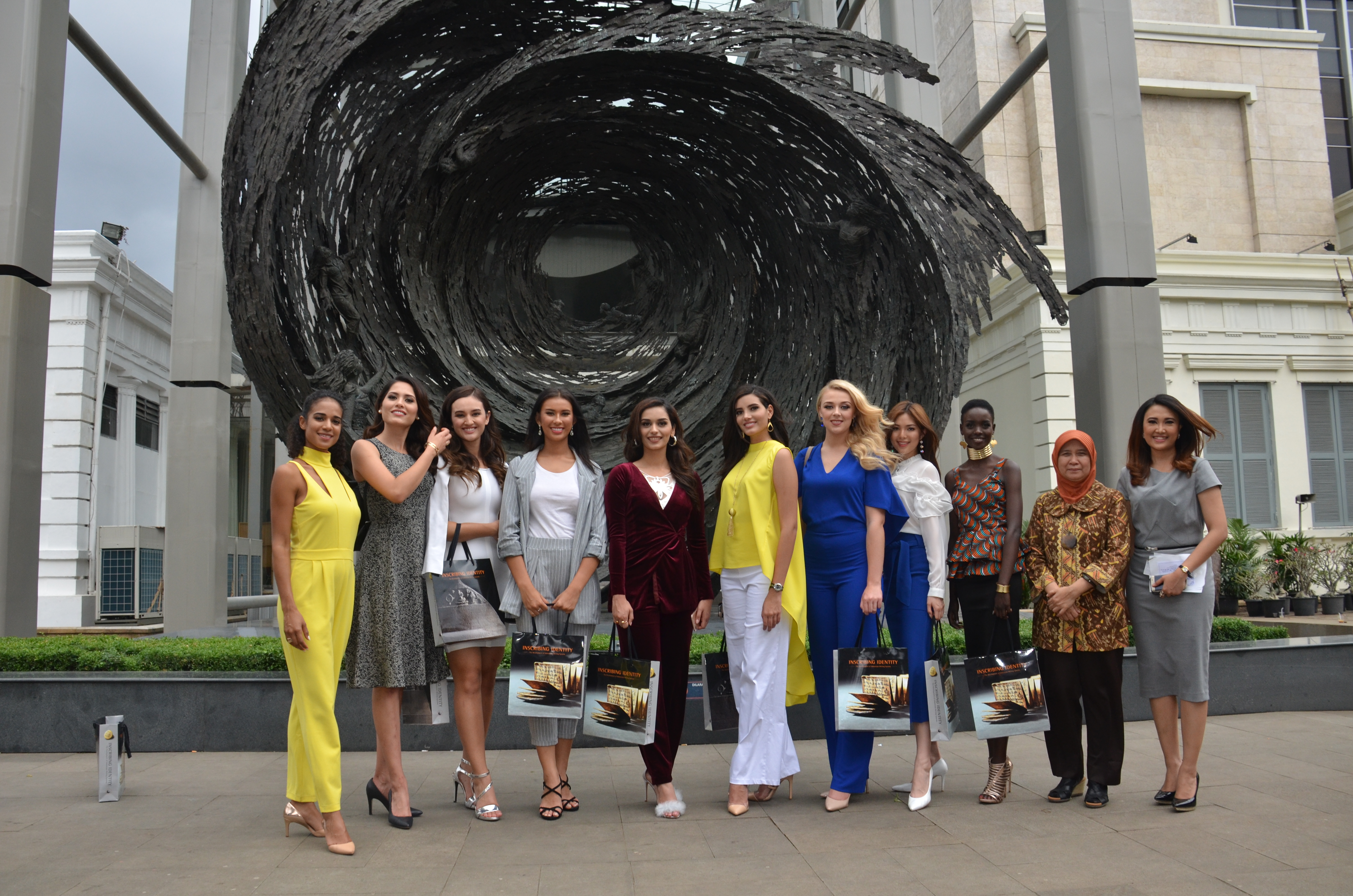
Miss World 2017 with Miss World 2016 and 2017 Runners-up and Continental Queens visiting National Museum of Indonesia.

From 1951 to 1952 and 1959 to 1980 the pageant has awarded a Top 5 with the Miss World, 1st, 2nd, 3rd, and 4th runner-up being awarded. In 1981–2017 and 2019-2021 the pageant has awarded a Top 3 with the Miss World, 1st, and 2nd runner-up being awarded. On the other hand, the pageant has awarded a Top 6 in 1953 to 1956 and 1958 with Miss World, 1st, 2nd, 3rd, 4th and 5th runner-up being awarded. Only in 1957 the pageant has awarded a Top 7 with the Miss World, 1st, 2nd, 3rd, 4th, 5th, and 6th runner-up being awarded. In 2018 and 2023 the pageant has awarded a Top 2 with the Miss World and 1st runner-up being awarded. and In 2025 the pageant has awarded a Top 4 with the Miss World, 1st, 2nd, and 3rd runner-up being awarded. Since 1959 top Each runner-up was given a tiara.

Since the pageant is based in 1951, the runner-up ranking for contest is usually announced as follows:

- 1st-Place finisher being designated as Miss World
- 2nd-Place finisher being designated as 1st runner-up
- 3rd-Place finisher being designated as 2nd runner-up
- 4th-Place finisher being designated as 3rd runner-up
- 5th-Place finisher being designated as 4th runner-up
- 6th-Place finisher being designated as 5th runner-up
- 7th-Place finisher being designated as 6th runner-up

This table shows the runner-up of each competition, from its inception in 1951.

Year	Miss World (1st place)	1st runner-up (2nd place)	2nd runner-up (3rd place)	3rd runner-up (4th place)	4th runner-up (5th place)	5th runner-up (6th place)	6th runner-up (7th place)
1951	Kiki Håkansson †; Sweden	Laura Ellison Davies; Great Britain	Doreen Dawne; Great Britain	Jacqueline Lemoine; France	Aileen P. Chase; Great Britain	Not awarded	Not awarded
1952	May-Louise Flodin †; Sweden	Sylvia Müller; Switzerland	Vera Marks; Germany	Eeva Hellas; Finland	Marleen Ann Dee; Great Britain	Not awarded	Not awarded
1953	Denise Perrier; France	Alexandra Ladikou; Greece	Marina Papaelia; Egypt	Manel Illangakoon; Ceylon	Mary Kemp Griffith; United States	Not awarded	Not awarded
1954	Antigone Costanda; Egypt	Karin Hultman; United States	Efi Mela; Greece	Claudine Bleuse; France	Frauke Walther; Germany	Grete Hoffenblad; Denmark	Not awarded
1955	Susana Duijm †; Venezuela	Margaret Anne Haywood; United States	Julia Coumoundourou; Greece	Gilda Marín; Cuba	Anita Åstrand; Sweden	Gisele Thierry; France	Not awarded
1956	Petra Schürmann †; Germany	Betty Lane Cherry; United States	Rina Weiss; Israel	Midoriko Tokura; Japan	Anne Rye Nielsen; Denmark	Eva Bränn; Sweden	Not awarded
1957	Marita Lindahl †; Finland	Lilian Juul Madsen; Denmark	Adele June Kruger; South Africa	Jacqueline Tapia; Tunisia	Muneko Yorifuji; Japan	Claude Inès Navarro; France	Sara Elimor; Israel
1958	Penelope Coelen; South Africa	Claudine Auger; France	Vinnie Ingemann; Denmark	Harriet Margareta Wågström; Sweden	Lucienne Struve; Holland	Eileen Sheridan; United Kingdom	Not awarded
1959	Corine Rottschäfer †; Holland	María Elena Rossel; Peru	Ziva Shomrat; Israel	Anne Thelwell; United Kingdom	Kirsten Olsen; Denmark	Not awarded	Not awarded
1960	Norma Cappagli †; Argentina	Gila Golan; Israel	Denise Muir; South Africa	Ingrun Helgard Möckel; Germany	Judith Ann Achter; United States	Not awarded	Not awarded
1961	Rosemarie Frankland †; United Kingdom	Grace Li Shiu-ying; Republic of China	Carmen Cervera; Spain	Michèle Wargnier; France	Inge Jörgensen; Denmark	Not awarded	Not awarded
1962	Catharina Lodders; Holland	Kaarina Leskinen; Finland	Monique Lemaire; France	Yvonne Ficker; South Africa	Teruko Ikeda; Japan	Not awarded	Not awarded
1963	Carole Crawford; Jamaica	Elaine Miscall; New Zealand	Marja-Liisa Ståhlberg; Finland	Aino Korva; Denmark	Grete Qviberg; Sweden	Not awarded	Not awarded
1964	Ann Sidney; United Kingdom	Ana María Soria; Argentina	Linda Lin Su-hsing; Taiwan	Maria Isabel de Avellar Elias; Brazil	Lyndal Ursula Cruickshank; New Zealand	Not awarded	Not awarded
1965	Lesley Langley; United Kingdom	Dianna Lynn Batts; United States	Gladys Anne Waller; Ireland	Ingrid Kopetzky; Austria	Marie Tapare; Tahiti	Not awarded	Not awarded
1966	Reita Faria; India	Nikica Marinovic; Yugoslavia	Efi Fontini Plumbi; Greece	Marlucci Rocha; Brazil	Gigliola Carbonara; Italy	Not awarded	Not awarded
1967	Madeleine Hartog-Bel; Peru	María del Carmen Sabaliauskas; Argentina	Shakira Baksh; Guyana	Dalia Regev; Israel	Jennifer Lynn Lewis; United Kingdom	Not awarded	Not awarded
1968	Penelope Plummer; Australia	Kathleen Winstanley; United Kingdom	Miri Zamir; Israel	Beatriz Sierra González; Colombia	Arene Cecilia Amabuyok; Philippines	Not awarded	Not awarded
1969	Eva Rueber-Staier; Austria	Gail Renshaw; United States	Christa Margraf; Germany	Pamela Patricia Lord; Guyana	Marzia Piazza; Venezuela	Not awarded	Not awarded
1970	Jennifer Hosten; Grenada	Pearl Jansen; Africa South	Irith Lavi; Israel	Marjorie Johansson; Sweden	Jillian Jessup; South Africa	Not awarded	Not awarded
1971	Lúcia Petterle; Brazil	Marilyn Ward; United Kingdom	Ana Paula de Almeida; Portugal	Nalini Moonsar; Guyana	Ava Joy Gill; Jamaica	Not awarded	Not awarded
1972	Belinda Green; Australia	Ingeborg Sørensen; Norway	Chana Ordan; Israel	Ursula Pacher; Austria	Malathi Basappa; India	Not awarded	Not awarded
1973	Marjorie Wallace (Dethroned); United States	Evangeline Pascual; Philippines	Patsy Yuen; Jamaica	Chaja Katzir; Israel	Shelley Latham; South Africa	Not awarded	Not awarded
1974	Helen Morgan (Resigned); United Kingdom	Anneline Kriel (Assumed); South Africa	Lea Klain; Israel	Gail Petith; Australia	Terry Ann Browning; United States	Not awarded	Not awarded
1975	Wilnelia Merced; Puerto Rico	Marina Langner; Germany	Vicki Harris; United Kingdom	Maxie Clark; Cuba	Lidija Velkovska; Yugoslavia	Not awarded	Not awarded
1976	Cindy Breakspeare; Jamaica	Karen Pini; Australia	Diana Marie Duenas; Guam	Carol Jean Grant; United Kingdom	Merja Helena Tammih; Finland	Not awarded	Not awarded
1977	Mary Stävin; Sweden	Ineke Berends; Holland	Dagmar Winkler; Germany	Madalena Sbaraini; Brazil	Cindy Darlene Miller; United States	Not awarded	Not awarded
1978	Silvana Suárez; Argentina	Ossie Carlsson; Sweden	Denise Coward; Australia	Martha Eugenia Ortíz; Mexico	Gloria Valenciano; Spain	Not awarded	Not awarded
1979	Gina Swainson; Bermuda	Carolyn Seaward; United Kingdom	Debbie Campbell; Jamaica	Jodie Day; Australia	Barbara Meyer; Switzerland	Not awarded	Not awarded
1980	Gabriella Brum (Resigned); Germany	Kimberley Santos (Assumed); Guam	Patricia Barzyk; France	Anat Zimmermann; Israel	Kim Ashfield; United Kingdom	Not awarded	Not awarded
1981	Pilín León; Venezuela	Nini Johanna Soto; Colombia	Sandra Angela Cunningham; Jamaica	Not awarded	Not awarded	Not awarded	Not awarded
1982	Mariasela Álvarez; Dominican Republic	Sari Aspholm; Finland	Della Dolan; United Kingdom	Not awarded	Not awarded	Not awarded	Not awarded
1983	Sarah-Jane Hutt; United Kingdom	Rocío Luna; Colombia	Cátia Pedrosa; Brazil	Not awarded	Not awarded	Not awarded	Not awarded
1984	Astrid Carolina Herrera; Venezuela	Constance Fitzpatrick; Canada	Lou-Anne Ronchi; Australia	Not awarded	Not awarded	Not awarded	Not awarded
1985	Hólmfríður Karlsdóttir; Iceland	Mandy Shires; United Kingdom	Brenda Denton; United States	Not awarded	Not awarded	Not awarded	Not awarded
1986	Giselle Laronde; Trinidad and Tobago	Pia Larsen; Denmark	Chantal Schreiber; Austria	Not awarded	Not awarded	Not awarded	Not awarded
1987	Ulla Weigerstorfer; Austria	Albany Lozada; Venezuela	Anna Jónsdóttir; Iceland	Not awarded	Not awarded	Not awarded	Not awarded
1988	Linda Pétursdóttir; Iceland	Yeon-hee Choi; South Korea	Kirsty Roper; United Kingdom	Not awarded	Not awarded	Not awarded	Not awarded
1989	Aneta Kręglicka; Poland	Leanne Caputo; Canada	Mónica María Isaza; Colombia	Not awarded	Not awarded	Not awarded	Not awarded
1990	Gina Tolleson; United States	Siobhan McClafferty; Ireland	Sharon Luengo; Venezuela	Not awarded	Not awarded	Not awarded	Not awarded
1991	Ninibeth Leal; Venezuela	Leanne Buckle; Australia	Diana Tilden-Davis; South Africa	Not awarded	Not awarded	Not awarded	Not awarded
1992	Julia Kourotchkina; Russia	Claire Smith; United Kingdom	Francis Gago; Venezuela	Not awarded	Not awarded	Not awarded	Not awarded
1993	Lisa Hanna; Jamaica	Palesa Mofokeng; South Africa	Ruffa Gutierrez; Philippines	Not awarded	Not awarded	Not awarded	Not awarded
1994	Aishwarya Rai; India	Basetsana Makgalemele; South Africa	Irene Ferreira; Venezuela	Not awarded	Not awarded	Not awarded	Not awarded
1995	Jacqueline Aguilera; Venezuela	Anica Martinović; Croatia	Michelle Khan; Trinidad and Tobago	Not awarded	Not awarded	Not awarded	Not awarded
1996	Irene Skliva; Greece	Carolina Arango; Colombia	Anuska Prado; Brazil	Not awarded	Not awarded	Not awarded	Not awarded
1997	Diana Hayden; India	Lauralee Martinovich; New Zealand	Jessica Motaung; South Africa	Not awarded	Not awarded	Not awarded	Not awarded
1998	Linor Abargil; Israel	Véronique Caloc; France	Lina Teoh; Malaysia	Not awarded	Not awarded	Not awarded	Not awarded
1999	Yukta Mookhey; India	Martina Thorogood; Venezuela	Sonia Raciti; South Africa	Not awarded	Not awarded	Not awarded	Not awarded
2000	Priyanka Chopra; India	Giorgia Palmas; Italy	Yüksel Ak; Turkey	Not awarded	Not awarded	Not awarded	Not awarded
2001	Agbani Darego; Nigeria	Zizi Lee; Aruba	Juliet-Jane Horne; Scotland	Not awarded	Not awarded	Not awarded	Not awarded
2002	Azra Akın; Turkey	Natalia Peralta; Colombia	Marina Mora; Peru	Not awarded	Not awarded	Not awarded	Not awarded
2003	Rosanna Davison; Ireland	Nazanin Afshin-Jam; Canada	Guan Qi; China	Not awarded	Not awarded	Not awarded	Not awarded
2004	María Julia Mantilla; Peru	Claudia Cruz; Dominican Republic	Nancy Randall; United States	Not awarded	Not awarded	Not awarded	Not awarded
2005	Unnur Vilhjálmsdóttir; Iceland	Dafne Molina; Mexico	Ingrid Rivera; Puerto Rico	Not awarded	Not awarded	Not awarded	Not awarded
2006	Taťána Kuchařová; Czech Republic	Ioana Boitor; Romania	Sabrina Houssami; Australia	Not awarded	Not awarded	Not awarded	Not awarded
2007	Zhang Zilin; China	Micaela Reis; Angola	Carolina Morán; Mexico	Not awarded	Not awarded	Not awarded	Not awarded
2008	Ksenia Sukhinova; Russia	Parvathy Omanakuttan; India	Gabrielle Walcott; Trinidad & Tobago	Not awarded	Not awarded	Not awarded	Not awarded
2009	Kaiane Aldorino; Gibraltar	Perla Beltrán; Mexico	Tatum Keshwar; South Africa	Not awarded	Not awarded	Not awarded	Not awarded
2010	Alexandria Mills; United States	Emma Wareus; Botswana	Adriana Vasini; Venezuela	Not awarded	Not awarded	Not awarded	Not awarded
2011	Ivian Sarcos; Venezuela	Gwendoline Ruais; Philippines	Amanda Vilanova; Puerto Rico	Not awarded	Not awarded	Not awarded	Not awarded
2012	Yu Wenxia; China	Sophie Moulds; Wales	Jessica Kahawaty; Australia	Not awarded	Not awarded	Not awarded	Not awarded
2013	Megan Young; Philippines	Marine Lorphelin; France	Naa Okailey Shooter; Ghana	Not awarded	Not awarded	Not awarded	Not awarded
2014	Rolene Strauss; South Africa	Edina Kulcsár; Hungary	Elizabeth Safrit; United States	Not awarded	Not awarded	Not awarded	Not awarded
2015	Mireia Lalaguna; Spain	Sofia Nikitchuk; Russia	Maria Harfanti; Indonesia	Not awarded	Not awarded	Not awarded	Not awarded
2016	Stephanie Del Valle; Puerto Rico	Yaritza Reyes; Dominican Republic	Natasha Mannuela; Indonesia	Not awarded	Not awarded	Not awarded	Not awarded
2017	Manushi Chhillar; India	Andrea Meza; Mexico	Stephanie Hill; England	Not awarded	Not awarded	Not awarded	Not awarded
2018	Vanessa Ponce; Mexico	Nicolene Bunchu; Thailand	Not awarded	Not awarded	Not awarded	Not awarded	Not awarded
2019	Toni-Ann Singh; Jamaica	Ophély Mézino; France	Suman Rao; India	Not awarded	Not awarded	Not awarded	Not awarded
2020		No competition held due to the COVID-19 pandemic					
2021	Karolina Bielawska; Poland	Shree Saini; United States	Olivia Yacé; Cote D'Ivoire	Not awarded	Not awarded	Not awarded	Not awarded
2022		No competition held due to the delay of the 2021 pageant					
2023	Krystyna Pyszková; Czech Republic	Yasmina Zaytoun; Lebanon	Not awarded	Not awarded	Not awarded	Not awarded	Not awarded
2024		No competition held due to the delay of the 2023 pageant					
2025	Suchata Chuangsri; Thailand	Hasset Dereje; Ethiopia	Maja Klajda; Poland	Aurélie Joachim; Martinique	Not awarded	Not awarded	Not awarded
2026	Joheirry Mola; Dominican Republic	Elisabeth Reynés; Spain	Taanusiya Chetty; Malaysia	Not awarded	Not awarded	Not awarded	Not awarded

== Countries/Territories by number of runners-up ==
=== 1st runner-up ===
The first runner-up of each edition of Miss World is the second placer behind the candidate who is crowned as Miss World (first placer).

The second place finisher being designated as 1st runner-up has been awarded 72 times (1951–2025).

This table lists the number of 1st runner-up titles by country. There are some special considerations:

- As South Africa and Guam took over the Miss World title in 1974 and 1980, it is unknown if the 1st runner-up position was taken by another candidate after the succession took place.
- Since 2000. Competed as Miss England, Northern Ireland, Scotland and Wales, their results were inherited by Miss United Kingdom.

The current 1st runner-up is Yasmina Zaytoun from Lebanon, elected on 9 March 2024 in Mumbai, India.

Country/Territory	Titles	Year(s)
United States	6	1954, 1955, 1956, 1965, 1969, 2021
United Kingdom	6	1951, 1968, 1971, 1979, 1985, 1992
France	4	1958, 1998, 2013, 2019
Colombia	4	1981, 1983, 1996, 2002
Mexico	3	2005, 2009, 2017
Canada	3	1984, 1989, 2003
South Africa	3	1970, 1993, 1994
Dominican Republic	2	2004, 2016
Philippines	2	1973, 2011
Venezuela	2	1987, 1999
New Zealand	2	1963, 1997
Australia	2	1976, 1991
Denmark	2	1957, 1986
Finland	2	1962, 1982
Argentina	2	1964, 1967
Spain	1	2026
Ethiopia	1	2025
Lebanon	1	2023
Thailand	1	2018
Russia	1	2015
Hungary	1	2014
Wales	1	2012
Botswana	1	2010
India	1	2008
Angola	1	2007
Romania	1	2006
Aruba	1	2001
Italy	1	2000
Croatia	1	1995
Ireland	1	1990
South Korea	1	1988
Sweden	1	1978
Netherlands	1	1977
Germany	1	1975
Norway	1	1972
Yugoslavia	1	1966
Taiwan	1	1961
Israel	1	1960
Peru	1	1959
Greece	1	1953
Switzerland	1	1952

Assumed wins

Miss World titles assumed by 1st runner-up delegates following resignations.

Country or territory	Titles	Years
Guam	1	1980
South Africa	1	1974

=== 2nd runner-up ===
The second runner-up of each edition of Miss World is the third placer behind the candidate who is crowned as Miss World (first placer).

The third place finisher being designated as 2nd runner-up has been awarded 70 times (1951–2025).

This table lists the number of 2nd runner-up titles by country. There are some special considerations:

- Since 2000 competed as Miss England, Northern Ireland, Scotland and Wales, their results were inherited by Miss United Kingdom.

Country/Territory	Titles	Year(s)
South Africa	6	1957, 1960, 1991, 1997, 1999, 2009
Israel	6	1956, 1959, 1968, 1970, 1972, 1974
Australia	4	1978, 1984, 2006, 2012
Venezuela	4	1990, 1992, 1994, 2010
United Kingdom	4	1951, 1975, 1982, 1988
United States	3	1985, 2004, 2014
Jamaica	3	1973, 1979, 1981
Germany	3	1952, 1969, 1977
Greece	3	1954, 1955, 1966
Malaysia	2	1998, 2026
Indonesia	2	2015, 2016
Puerto Rico	2	2005, 2011
Trinidad and Tobago	2	1995, 2008
Brazil	2	1983, 1996
France	2	1962, 1980
Poland	1	2025
Cote D'Ivoire	1	2021
India	1	2019
Uganda	1	2018
England	1	2017
Ghana	1	2013
Mexico	1	2007
China	1	2003
Peru	1	2002
Scotland	1	2001
Turkey	1	2000
Philippines	1	1993
Colombia	1	1989
Iceland	1	1987
Austria	1	1986
Guam	1	1976
Portugal	1	1971
Guyana	1	1967
Ireland	1	1965
Taiwan	1	1964
Finland	1	1963
Spain	1	1961
Denmark	1	1958
Egypt	1	1953

=== 3rd runner-up ===
The third Runner-Up of each edition of Miss World is the fourth placer behind the candidate who is crowned as Miss World (first placer).

The fourth place finisher being designated as 3rd runner-up has been awarded 32 times (1951–1980; 2025).

This table lists the number of 3rd Runner-Up titles by country.

Country/Territory	Titles	Year(s)
Israel	3	1967, 1973, 1980,
Brazil	3	1964, 1966, 1977
France	3	1951, 1954, 1961
United Kingdom	2	1959, 1976,
Australia	2	1974, 1979
Cuba	2	1955, 1975
Austria	2	1965, 1972
Guyana	2	1969, 1971
Sweden	2	1958, 1970
Martinique	1	2025
Mexico	1	1978
Colombia	1	1968
Denmark	1	1963
South Africa	1	1962
Germany	1	1960
Tunisia	1	1957
Japan	1	1956
Sri Lanka	1	1953
Finland	1	1952

=== 4th runner-up ===
The fourth Runner-Up of each edition of Miss World is the fifth placer behind the candidate who is crowned as Miss World (first placer).

The fifth place finisher being designated as 4th runner-up has been awarded 30 times (1951–1980).

This table lists the number of 4th Runner-Up titles by country.

Country/Territory	Titles	Year(s)
United Kingdom	4	1951, 1952, 1967, 1980
United States	4	1953, 1960, 1974, 1977,
Denmark	3	1956, 1959, 1961
South Africa	2	1970, 1973
Sweden	2	1955, 1963
Japan	2	1957, 1962
Switzerland	1	1979
Spain	1	1978
Finland	1	1976
Yugoslavia	1	1975
India	1	1972
Jamaica	1	1971
Venezuela	1	1969
Philippines	1	1968
Italy	1	1966
Tahiti	1	1965
New Zealand	1	1964
Netherlands	1	1958
Germany	1	1954

=== 5th runner-up ===
The fifth Runner-Up of each edition of Miss World is the sixth placer behind the candidate who is crowned as Miss World (first placer).

The sixth place finisher being designated as 5th runner-up has been awarded 5 times (1954–1958).

This table lists the number of 5th Runner-Up titles by country.

Country/Territory	Titles	Year(s)
France	2	1955, 1957
United Kingdom	1	1958
Sweden	1	1956
Denmark	1	1954

=== 6th runner-up ===
The sixth Runner-Up of each edition of Miss World is the seventh placer behind the candidate who is crowned as Miss World (first placer).

The seventh place finisher being designated as 6th runner-up has been awarded 1 time (1957).

This table lists the number of 6th Runner-Up titles by country.

Country/Territory	Titles	Year(s)
Israel	1	1957

== Miss World runners-up and finalists table position ==
Country or territory	No.	Miss World (1st place)	1st runner-up (2nd place)	2nd runner-up (3rd place)	3rd runner-up (4th place)	4th runner-up (5th place)	5th runner-up (6th place)	6th runner-up (7th place)
Venezuela	13	6 (1955, 1981, 1984, 1991, 1995, 2011)	2 (1987, 1999)	4 (1990, 1992, 1994, 2010)	x	1 (1969)	×	x
India	9	6 (1966, 1994, 1997, 1999, 2000, 2017)	1 (2008)	1 (2019)	x	1 (1972)	×	×
United Kingdom	21	4 (1961, 1964, 1965, ~~1974~~, (Note: Despite resigned the Miss World title, statistically the placement is taken into account.) 1983)	6 (1951, 1968, 1971, 1979, 1985, 1992)	4 (1951, 1975, 1982, 1988)	2 (1959, 1976)	4 (1951, 1952, 1967, 1980)	1 (1958)	x
Jamaica	8	4 (1963, 1976, 1993, 2019)	×	3 (1973, 1979, 1981)	x	1 (1971)	×	x
United States	16	3 (1973, 1990, 2010)	6 (1954, 1955, 1956, 1965, 1969, 2021)	3 (1985, 2004, 2014)	×	4 (1953, 1960, 1974, 1977)	x	x
South Africa	14	3 (1958, **1974**, 2014)	2 (~~1974~~, 1993, 1994)	6 (1957, 1960, 1991, 1997, 1999, 2009)	1 (1962)	2 (1970, 1973)	x	×
Sweden	9	3 (1951, 1952, 1977)	1 (1978)	×	2 (1958, 1970)	2 (1955, 1963)	1 (1956)	×
Iceland	4	3 (1985, 1988, 2005)	×	1 (1987)	x	×	×	×
Australia	10	2 (1968, 1972)	2 (1976, 1991)	4 (1978, 1984, 2006, 2012)	2 (1974, 1979)	×	x	x
Dominican Republic	4	2 (1982, 2026)	2 (2004, 2016)	×	×	×	x	×
Argentina	4	2 (1960, 1978)	2 (1964, 1967)	×	×	×	x	×
Peru	4	2 (1967, 2004)	1 (1959)	1 (2002)	×	×	×	×
Netherlands	4	2 (1959, 1962)	1 (1977)	×	×	1 (1958)	x	×
Russia	3	2 (1992, 2008)	1 (2015)	×	×	×	×	×
Puerto Rico	4	2 (1975, 2016)	×	2 (2005, 2011)	×	×	×	×
Austria	5	2 (1969, 1987)	×	1 (1986)	2 (1965, 1972)	×	×	x
Poland	3	2 (1989, 2021)	×	1 (2025)	x	×	×	×
China	3	2 (2007, 2012)	×	1 (2003)	×	x	×	×
Czech Republic	2	2 (2006, 2023)	×	×	x	×	×	×
France	12	1 (1953)	4 (1958, 1998, 2013, 2019)	2 (1962, 1980)	3 (1951, 1954, 1961)	×	2 (1955, 1957)	
Mexico	6	1 (2018)	3 (2005, 2009, 2017)	1 (2007)	1 (1978)	×	×	×
Finland	6	1 (1957)	2 (1962, 1982)	1 (1963)	1 (1952)	1 (1976)	×	x
Philippines	5	1 (2013)	2 (1973, 2011)	1 (1993)	×	1 (1968)	×	×
Israel	11	1 (1998)	1 (1960)	6 (1956, 1959, 1968, 1970, 1972, 1974)	3 (1967, 1973, 1980)	×	x	1 (1957)
Germany	8	1 (1956, ~~1980~~)	1 (1975)	3 (1952, 1969, 1977)	1 (1960)	1 (1954)	×	x
Spain	4	1 (2015)	1 (2026)	1 (1961)	×	1 (1978)	×	×
Greece	5	1 (1996)	1 (1953)	3 (1954, 1955, 1966)	×	×	×	×
Ireland	3	1 (2003)	1 (1990)	1 (1965)	×	×	×	x
Thailand	2	1 (2025)	1 (2018)	×	x	x	×	×
Brazil	6	1 (1971)	×	2 (1983, 1996)	3 (1964, 1966, 1977)	×	x	×
Trinidad and Tobago	3	1 (1986)	×	2 (1995, 2008)	×	×	x	×
Turkey	2	1 (2002)	×	1 (2000)	x	×	×	x
Guam	2	1 (**1980**)	0 (~~1980~~)	1 (1976)	×	×	×	×
Egypt	2	1 (1954)	×	1 (1953)	×	×	×	×
Gibraltar	1	1 (2009)	×	×	×	×	×	×
Nigeria	1	1 (2001)	×	×	×	×	×	×
Bermuda	1	1 (1979)	×	×	×	×	×	×
Grenada	1	1 (1970)	×	×	×	×	×	×
Colombia	6	×	4 (1981, 1983, 1996, 2002)	1 (1989)	1 (1968)	x	×	×
Canada	3	×	3 (1984, 1989, 2003)	×	×	×	×	
Denmark	8	×	2 (1957, 1986)	1 (1958)	1 (1963)	3 (1956, 1959, 1961)	1 (1954)	x
New Zealand	3	×	2 (1963, 1997)	×	x	1 (1964)	×	x
Chinese Taipei	2	×	1 (1961)	1 (1964)	×	×	×	×
Italy	2	×	1 (2000)	×	×	1 (1966)	x	×
Switzerland	2	×	1 (1952)	×		1 (1979)	×	x
Yugoslavia	2	×	1 (1966)	×	×	1 (1975)	×	×
Ethiopia	1	×	1 (2025)	×	x	x	×	×
Lebanon	1	×	1 (2023)	×	x	x	×	×
Croatia	1	×	1 (1995)	×	x	x	×	×
Norway	1	×	1 (1972)	×	x	×	×	x
South Korea	1	×	1 (1988)	×	×	x	×	×
Hungary	1	×	1 (2014)	×	×	×	×	×
Wales	1	×	1 (2012)	×	×	×	×	×
Botswana	1	×	1 (2010)	×	×	×	×	×
Angola	1	×	1 (2007)	×	×	×	×	×
Romania	1	×	1 (2006)	×	×	×	×	×
Aruba	1	×	1 (2001)	×	×	×	×	×
Africa South	1	×	1 (1970)	×	×	×	×	×
Malaysia	2	×	×	2 (1998, 2026)	×	×	×	×
Indonesia	2	×	×	2 (2015, 2016)	×	×	×	×
Guyana	3	×	×	1 (1967)	2 (1969, 1971)	×	×	x
Cote D'Ivoire	1	×	×	1 (2021)	×	×	×	×
England	1	×	×	1 (2017)	×	×	×	×
Ghana	1	×	×	1 (2013)	×	×	×	×
Scotland	1	×	×	1 (2001)	×	×	×	×
Portugal	1	×	×	1 (1971)	×	×	×	×
Cuba	2	×	×	×	2 (1955, 1975)	×	×	×
Japan	3	×	×	×	1 (1956)	2 (1957, 1962)	×	×
Martinique	1	×	×	×	1 (2025)	×	×	×
Tunisia	1	×	×	×	1 (1957)	×	×	×
Sri Lanka	1	×	×	×	1 (1953)	×	×	×
Tahiti	1	×	×	×	×	1 (1965)	×	×
Total	**281**	**72**	**72**	**70**	**31**	**30**	**5**	**1**

The country/territory who assumed a position is indicated in bold
The country/territory who was dethroned, resigned or originally held the position is indicated in striketrough
The country/territory who was dethroned, resigned or originally held the position but was not replaced is indicated underlined.

== Continental Queens ==
The Continental Queens of Beauty were awarded for the first time in 1981. The continental titles were given to delegates who placed highest in the final, aside from the main crown.

Year	Miss World Africa	Miss World Americas	Miss World Asia	Miss World Caribbean	Miss World Europe	Miss World Oceania
2013	Carranzar Naa Okailey Shooter; Ghana	Sancler Frantz; Brazil	Megan Young; Philippines	Gina Hargitay; Jamaica	Marine Lorphelin; France	Erin Holland; Australia
2014	Rolene Strauss; South Africa	Elizabeth Safrit; United States	Koyal Rana; India	Rafieya Husain; Guyana	Edina Kulcsár; Hungary	Courtney Thorpe; Australia
2015	Liesl Laurie; South Africa	Catharina Choi Nunes; Brazil	Maria Harfanti; Indonesia	Sanneta Myrie; Jamaica	Mireia Lalaguna; Spain	Tess Alexander; Australia
2016	Evelyn Njambi; Kenya	Audra Mari; United States	Natasha Mannuela Halim; Indonesia	Yaritza Reyes; Dominican Republic	Lenty Frans; Belgium	Madeline Cowe; Australia
2017	Magline Jeruto; Kenya	Andrea Meza; Mexico	Ha-eun Kim; South Korea	Solange Sinclair; Jamaica	Stephanie Hill; England	Annie Evans; New Zealand
2018	Quiin Abenakyo; Uganda	Solaris Barba; Panama	Nicolene Limsnukan; Thailand	Kadijah Robinson; Jamaica	Maria Vasilevich; Belarus	Jessica Tyson; New Zealand
2019	Nyekachi Douglas; Nigeria	Elís Miele Coelho; Brazil	Suman Rao; India	Tya Jané Ramey; Trinidad and Tobago	Ophély Mézino; France	Tajiya Eikura Sahay; Cook Islands
2021	Olivia Yacé; Cote D'Ivoire	Shree Saini; United States	Pricilia Carla Yules; Indonesia	Emmy Peña; Dominican Republic	Anna Leitch; Northern Ireland	Not Awarded
2023	Lesego Chombo; Botswana	Leticía Frota; Brazil	Yasmina Zaytoun; Lebanon	Aché Abrahams; Trinidad and Tobago	Jessica Gagen; England	Kristen Wright; Australia
2025	Hasset Dereje; Ethiopia	Jéssica Pedroso; Brazil	Krishnah Gravidez; Philippines	Aurelié Joachim; Martinique	Maja Klajda; Poland	Jasmine Stringer; Australia
2026	Romanda Hombir; South Africa	Gabriela Botelho; Brazil	Taanusiya Chetty; Malaysia	Georgia-Lee Gill; Trinidad and Tobago	Elisabeth Reynés; Spain	Tiarē Henry-Anguna; Cook Islands

== See also ==
- List of Miss World titleholders
- List of Miss Earth elemental queens
- List of Miss International runners-up and finalists
- List of Miss Universe runners-up and finalists
- Big Four international beauty pageants
