= Snit Tewoldemedhin =

Eritrean beauty pageant titleholder

- Born: Snit Habteab Tewoldemedhin; 23 February 1999 (age 27); Asmara, Eritrea
- Education: George Mason University
- Occupations: Model; educator; beauty pageant titleholder
- Height: 1.78 m (5 ft 10 in)
- Beauty pageant titleholder
- Title: Miss Africa USA 2023; Miss Universe Eritrea 2024; Miss World Eritrea 2026
- Major competitions: Miss Africa USA 2023; (Winner); Miss Universe 2024; (Unplaced); Miss World 2026; (Top 6); (People's Choice winner)

Snit Habteab Tewoldemedhin (born 23 February 1999) is an Eritrean model, Montessori educator and beauty pageant titleholder. She represented Eritrea at Miss World 2026, where she won the People's Choice award and advanced to the final six.

Tewoldemedhin previously won Miss Africa USA 2023 and represented Eritrea at Miss Universe 2024, where she received Silver recognition in the Voice for Change programme.

== Early life and education ==
Tewoldemedhin was born and raised in Asmara, Eritrea. She moved to the United States in 2019 and studied biology at Northern Virginia Community College before attending George Mason University, where she earned a bachelor's degree in neuroscience.

She has worked as a Montessori educator and parent mentor. The official Miss World profile describes her as a Montessori educator, parent mentor, creator of Montessori learning resources and manager of nonprofit programmes.

Tewoldemedhin speaks Tigrinya, Italian, English, Amharic and French.

== Advocacy ==
Tewoldemedhin's advocacy has focused on inclusive education and opportunities for children with disabilities. She founded Designing for Diversity, an initiative concerned with creating inclusive learning opportunities for children with different learning needs.

Her advocacy has been influenced by her younger sister, who has Down syndrome. Tewoldemedhin has spoken publicly about disability inclusion and the importance of providing children with different learning needs with appropriate educational opportunities.

== Pageantry ==
=== Miss Africa USA 2023 ===
In 2023, Tewoldemedhin competed in Miss Africa USA 2023 and ultimately won the title, becoming the first Eritrean to win the competition. During her reign, she promoted inclusive education and disability awareness through her advocacy work.

=== Miss Universe 2024 ===
Tewoldemedhin represented Eritrea at Miss Universe 2024, held in Mexico. She participated in the Voice for Change programme, which recognized contestants' social-impact initiatives. She received Silver recognition in the programme, alongside other contestants whose projects were selected for their social-impact work.

=== Miss World 2026 ===
In 2026, Tewoldemedhin represented Eritrea at Miss World 2026, becoming the country's first representative at the competition. During the final coronation in Nha Trang, Vietnam, Tewoldemedhin was announced as the People's Choice winner and advanced to the Top 6. She was the People's Choice representative among the six finalists, alongside representatives of South Africa, the Dominican Republic, Vietnam, Spain and Malaysia, where the Dominican Republic's Joheirry Mola was crowned Miss World, with Spain's Elisabeth Reynés and Malaysia's Taanusiya Chetty finishing as first and second runners-up, respectively.
