= Miss Brazil CNB 2026 =

- Date: January 31, 2026
- Presenters: Juliano Crema; Gabi Torbes
- Entertainment: DJ Gabriel Souza
- Venue: CAESB Theater; Águas Claras, DF, Brazil
- Broadcaster: Livestream (YouTube)
- Entrants: 25

Miss Brazil CNB 2026 was the 35th edition of a competition specifically for the election of the most beautiful Brazilian woman seeking the title of Miss World, as well as Brazil's 64th year in the pageant. This year's pageant culminated on January 31st with 25 candidates vying for the title at the CAESB Theater in Águas Claras, in the Federal District of Brazil. The event is led by dermatologist Juliano Crema, along with businessmen and producers Mayck Carvalho and Miro Sampaio. Jéssica Pedrosa, Miss World Americas 2025, crown her successor at the end of the event, she was Gabriela Botelho, the contestant from Sergipe.

== Results ==
=== Placements ===
Placement	Representation & Contestant
Miss Brazil CNB 2026	Sergipe - Gabriela Botelho
1^{st} runner-up	Pará - Maria Cecília Nóbrega
2^{nd} runner-up	Rio de Janeiro - Carolina Faria
3^{rd} runner-up	Espírito Santo - Letícia Galvão
4^{th} runner-up	Mato Grosso - Maria Vitória Rondon
5^{th} runner-up	(Rio de Janeiro (state)) Rio de Janeiro Capital - Karine Cardoso
Top 15	Bahia - Karen Moitinho; (Federal District (Brazil)) Brasília - Sandra Luiza Lima; Minas Gerais - Giovanna Starling; (Paraná (state)) North of Paraná - Lorena Vicentin; Pernambuco - Erivânia Izídio; Santa Catarina - Camilly Ceccon; São Paulo - Ana Júlia Cruz; (Santa Catarina (state)) Serra Catarinense - Layana Grassi; Tocantins - Tainá Marrirú

=== Special Award ===
The winner was voted by the contestants:

Placement	Representation & Contestant
Miss Congeniality	Minas Gerais - Giovanna Starling

=== Regional Queens of Beauty ===
Placement	Representation & Contestant
Queen of the Central-West	Mato Grosso - Maria Vitória Rondon
Queen of the North	Pará - Maria Cecília Nóbrega
Queen of the Northeast	Pernambuco - Erivânia Izídio
Queen of the South	Santa Catarina - Camilly Ceccon
Queen of the Southest	Rio de Janeiro - Carolina Faria

=== Announcements order ===
==== Top 15 ====
1. Pará
2. Serra Catarinense
3. Tocantins
4. Mato Grosso
5. Rio de Janeiro Capital
6. Bahia
7. Santa Catarina
8. Minas Gerais
9. Rio de Janeiro
10. Norte Paranaense
11. Pernambuco
12. Sergipe
13. São Paulo
14. Espírito Santo
15. Brasília

==== Top 6 ====
1. Rio de Janeiro Capital
2. Espírito Santo
3. Pará
4. Mato Grosso
5. Rio de Janeiro
6. Sergipe

== Judges ==
=== Final ===
1. (Federal District (Brazil)) Janaína Dias, floral designer;
2. (Amazonas (Brazilian state)) Miro Sampaio, director from CNB;
3. (Pernambuco) João Camilo Dias, director from CNB;
4. (Federal District (Brazil)) Luciane Lima, anthropologist from "MORHAN";
5. (Santa Catarina (state)) Rodrigo D'Soni, Mister Brasil International 2025;
6. (São Paulo (state)) Sidney Schimidt, CEO from "Zyone Cosmestics";
7. (São Paulo (state)) Pedro Sobreira, CEO from "Luiza Sobreira";
8. (São Paulo (state)) Carla Araújo, CEO from "XMT Tur";
9. (Federal District (Brazil)) Marcus dos Anjos, hair stylist;

=== Preliminary ===
1. (Paraná (state)) Juliano Crema, director from CNB;
2. (Federal District (Brazil)) Mayck Carvalho, director from CNB;
3. (Pernambuco) João Camilo Dias, director from CNB;
4. (Federal District (Brazil)) Luciane Lima, anthropologist from "MORHAN";
5. (Santa Catarina (state)) Rodrigo D'Soni, Mister Brasil International 2025;
6. (São Paulo (state)) Sidney Schimidt, CEO from "Zyone Cosmestics";
7. (São Paulo (state)) Pedro Sobreira, CEO from "Luiza Sobreira"
8. (São Paulo (state)) Carla Araújo, CEO from "XMT Tur";
9. (Federal District (Brazil)) Jéssica Carvalho, businesswoman;
10. (Amazonas (Brazilian state)) Miro Sampaio, director from CNB;

== Fast Track Events ==
=== Beauty with a Purpose ===
The winner classified in the Top 15:

Position	Representation & Contestant
1st place, gold medalist(s)	Espírito Santo - Letícia Galvão
Top 05	Pará - Maria Cecília Nóbrega; (Rio de Janeiro (state)) Rio de Janeiro - Carolina Faria; Sergipe - Gabriela Botelho; Tocantins - Tainá Marrirú

=== Miss Popular Vote ===
The winner classified in the Top 06:

Position	Representation & Contestant
1st place, gold medalist(s)	(Rio de Janeiro (state)) Rio de Janeiro Capital - Karine Cardoso
2nd place, silver medalist(s)	(Paraná (state)) Greater Curitiba - Michelle Grant
3rd place, bronze medalist(s)	Bahia - Karen Moitinho
Top 10	Minas Gerais - Giovanna Starling; Santa Catarina - Camilly Ceccon; Espírito Santo - Letícia Galvão; (Santa Catarina (state)) Serra Catarinense - Layana Grassi; Pernambuco - Erivânia Izídio; Mato Grosso - Maria Vitória Rondon; São Paulo - Ana Júlia Cruz

=== Miss Talent ===
The winner classified in the Top 15:

Position	Representation & Contestant
1st place, gold medalist(s)	Pará - Maria Cecília Nóbrega
2nd place, silver medalist(s)	Sergipe - Gabriela Botelho
3rd place, bronze medalist(s)	(São Paulo (state)) São Paulo - Ana Júlia Cruz Souza
Top 12	Bahia - Karen Moitinho; (Federal District (Brazil)) Brasília - Sandra Luiza; Espírito Santo - Letícia Galvão; Mato Grosso - Maria Vitória Rondon; Mato Grosso do Sul - Luana Businaro; Minas Gerais - Giovanna Starling; Rio Grande do Sul - Ana Savaris; (Santa Catarina (state)) Serra Catarinense - Layana Grassi; Tocantins - Tainá Marrirú

== Contestants ==
The 25 contestants in the competition this year:

Representation	Contestant	Age	Hometown	Occupation	Status	Ref
(Acre (state)) Acre	Cleiciane Bezerra Lima	23	Cruzeiro do Sul, AC	Nursing Student	Appointed	
(Amazonas (Brazilian state)) Amazonas	Jussarah Anne Fecury da Costa	23	Manaus, AM	Law Student	Appointed	
Bahia	Karen Rodrigues Moitinho	23	Irecê, BA	Actress and Artisan	Appointed	
(Federal District (Brazil)) Brasília	Sandra Luiza Lima Caetano	18	Águas Claras, DF	Model	State Pageant	
Espírito Santo	Letícia Lyra Galvão	27	Guarapari, ES	Veterinary	Appointed	
Goiás	Regina Nagutti	26	Goiânia, GO	Model and Communicator	Appointed	
(Paraná (state)) Greater Curitiba	Michelle Grant Algar	26	Maringá, PR	Social Media Marketing Specialist	Appointed	
(São Paulo (state)) Greater São Paulo	Letícia Rafaela de Souza	21	Rio Claro, SP	Beautician	Appointed	
(São Paulo (state)) Ipiranga	Ágatha Lopes	22	Peruíbe, SP	Dental Student	Appointed	
Mato Grosso	Maria Vitória Rondon	21	Cuiabá, MT	Journalism Student	Appointed	
Mato Grosso do Sul	Luana Alves Businaro	23	Bataguassu, MS	Computer Science Student	Appointed	
Minas Gerais	Giovanna Starling Aguiar	21	Belo Horizonte, MG	Model and Dental Student	State Pageant	
(Paraná (state)) North of Paraná	Lorena de Oliveira Vicentin	25	Arapongas, PR	Lawyer and Pedagogy Student	Appointed	
Pará	Maria Cecília Nóbrega	26	Belém, PA	Psychologist	Appointed	
Paraíba	Gabriela Ferreira de Satel	22	São Paulo, SP	Accounting student	Appointed	
(Paraná (state)) Paraná	Anna Beatriz Brandt	24	Rio Branco do Sul, PR	Digital Influencer	Appointed	
Pernambuco	Maria Erivânia Izídio Souza	26	Brejo da Madre de Deus, PE	Paleontologist and Scientist	Appointed	
(Rio de Janeiro (state)) Rio de Janeiro	Carolina Stoduto Faria	23	Nova Friburgo, RJ	Model and Nutrionist	Appointed	
(Rio de Janeiro (state)) Rio de Janeiro Capital	Karine Stella Cardoso	26	Rio de Janeiro, RJ	English/Spanish Teacher	Appointed	
Rio Grande do Sul	Ana Savaris	21	Entre Rios do Sul, RS	Biomedical Student	Appointed	
(Santa Catarina (state)) Santa Catarina	Camilly Eduarda Ceccon	21	Itajaí, SC	Dental Student	State Pageant	
(São Paulo (state)) São Paulo	Ana Júlia Cruz Souza	24	Ribeirão Preto, SP	Biomedical Pathologist	Appointed	
Sergipe	Gabriela Botelho Campos Serrano	25	Belo Horizonte, MG	Model and Businesswoman	Appointed	
(Santa Catarina (state)) Serra Catarinense	Layana Sara Grassi	23	Celso Ramos, SC	Publicist	Appointed	
Tocantins	Tainá Marrirú Karajá de Oliveira	25	São Paulo, SP	Sports Teacher	Appointed	

== Trivia ==
=== Withdrawals ===
- ⬇️ (São Paulo (state)) ABCD Region
- ⬇️ (Bahia) Costa do Descobrimento
- ⬇️ Costa Verde & Mar
- ⬇️ Maranhão
- ⬇️ (Rio Grande do Sul) Pampa Gaúcho
- ⬇️ Rio Grande do Norte
- ⬇️ (Maranhão) São Luís Island
- ⬇️ (São Paulo (state)) South-Central Zone of SP

=== Returnings ===
- ⬆️ (Rio de Janeiro (state)) Rio de Janeiro Capital
  - (This region last competed in 2017 contest)

=== Debuts ===
- ⬆️ (Paraná (state)) North of Paraná
- ⬆️ (Santa Catarina (state)) Serra Catarinense

=== Renunciation ===
- ⬇️ (Rio Grande do Sul) Ilha dos Lobos - Amanda Marques
- ⬇️ (Goiás) Cerrado Goiano - Giovanna Belmiro Lopes
- ⬇️ Rondônia - Aline Martins

== Crossovers ==
Contestants in other pageants

=== National ===
Miss Brazil CNB

- 2021: Sergipe - Gabriela Botelho (2nd runner-up)
  - (Representing the State of Espírito Santo in Brasília, Distrito Federal)

Miss Universe Brazil

- 2023: Pernambuco - Erivânia Izídio (Top 16)
  - (Representing the State of Pernambuco in São Paulo, São Paulo)
- 2023: Sergipe - Gabriela Botelho (Top 07)
  - (Representing the State of Sergipe in São Paulo, São Paulo)
- 2024: Espírito Santo - Letícia Galvão (Top 07)
  - (Representing the State of Espírito Santo in São Paulo, São Paulo)

Miss Brasil Beleza Internacional

- 2023: (Rio de Janeiro (state)) Rio de Janeiro Capital - Karine Cardoso
  - (Representing the State of Paraíba in Niterói, Rio de Janeiro)

Miss Earth Brazil

- 2024: Pará - Cecília Nóbrega (Top 16)
  - (Representing the State of Pará in São Paulo, São Paulo)

Miss Supranational Brazil

- 2022: (São Paulo (state)) Ipiranga - Ágatha Lopes
  - (Representing the Greater São Paulo in Balneário Camboriú, Santa Catarina)
- 2025: Paraíba - Gabriela Satel
  - (Representing the State of Paraíba in Balneário Camboriú, Santa Catarina)

=== International ===
Reina Mundial del Banano

- 2025: (Rio de Janeiro (state)) Rio de Janeiro Capital - Karine Cardoso
  - (Representing Brazil in Machala, Ecuador)

Miss Teen Mesoamerica International

- 2019: Tocantins - Tainá Marrirú (2nd runner-up)
  - (Representing Brazil in San Salvador, El Salvador)

== Designations ==
Contestants under CNB organization that represented Brazil in 2026 pageants:

=== 2026 ===
Declared as winner.
Ended as one of the runners-up.
Ended as one of the semifinalists.
Unplaced.

Contestant (Placement)	Pageant	Placement
Gabriela Botelho (Winner at Miss Brazil CNB 2026)	Miss World 2026 (Final: Nha Trang, Vietnam)	Top 12; Queen of Americas
Letícia Galvão (3rd runner-up at Miss Brazil CNB 2026)	Miss Charm 2026 (Final: Ho Chi Minh City, Vietnam)	05/12/2026
Giovanna Starling (Top 15 at Miss Brazil CNB 2026)	Miss Global 2026 (Final: Nonthaburi, Thailand)	Top 25
Lara Marina (Winner at Miss Supranational Brazil 2026)	Miss Supranational 2026 (Final: Nowy Sącz, Poland)	2nd runner-up; SupraModel from Americas
Cássia Adriane (2nd runner-up at Miss Supranational Brazil 2025)	Reina Hispanoamericana 2026 (Final: Santa Cruz de la Sierra, Bolivia)	Unplaced
Lorena Ohana (3rd runner-up at Miss Supranational Brazil 2025)	Reinado Internacional del Café 2026 (Final: Manizales, Colombia)	1st runner-up; Best Face

=== 2027 ===
Contestant (Placement)	Pageant	Placement
Cecília Nóbrega (1st runner-up at Miss Brazil CNB 2026)	Reinado Internacional del Café 2027 (Final: Manizales, Colombia)	TBD
