= Miss Grand Nigeria =

National beauty pageant in Nigeria

- Established: 11 September 2015; 11 years ago
- Founder: Loveth Ajufoh
- Type: Beauty pageant
- Headquarters: Benin City
- Location: Nigeria
- Members: Miss Grand International
- Official language: English
- National director: Jasper Salami
- Parent organization: Corporate Hostess and Modeling Service (2025 – Present)
- Website: MissGrandNigeria.com

Miss Grand Nigeria
licensees timeline

Stand-alone pageant
Appointed titleholder
Under other pageants
No titleholder/licensee

Miss Grand Nigeria is a national female beauty pageant in Nigeria, established in 2015 by a Lagos-based event organizer chaired by Loveth Ajufoh of QLA Nigeria. The winners of the contest, which was conducted independently in 2015 and 2016, were designated to represent Nigeria at its affiliated international pageant, Miss Grand International. Prior to this, in 2013, the national license was held by The Nigerian Princess; it was subsequently transferred to AMC Productions, organizer of Miss Earth Nigeria, in 2014, and later to QLA Nigeria Limited, 001 Entertainment—the organizer of The Nigerian Queen—and the Qhue Group in 2015, 2020, and 2023, respectively.

To date, Nigerian representatives have not secured the Miss Grand International title. The highest achievements by Nigerian delegates have been placements among the top twenty finalists, attained in 2021, 2022, and 2023.

== History ==
Nigeria first participated in Miss Grand International in 2014, represented by Tessy Kiri Bibowei, appointed by Miss Earth Nigeria. In 2015, QLA Nigeria Limited, chaired by Loveth Ajufoh, organized the inaugural Miss Grand Nigeria pageant, won by Ifeoma Jennifer Ohia of Plateau State. The second edition was held in 2016, followed by a virtual casting in 2017, after which QLA Nigeria ended its partnership.

The franchise returned to Miss Earth Nigeria in 2019 and was acquired by 001 Entertainment in 2020, with winners of The Nigerian Queen subsequently serving as national representatives, except in 2021 when the original titleholder was replaced by her second runner-up. In 2023, the license was transferred to Seth Santiago Roberts, founder of Miss Tourism Africa, and in 2025 to Corporate Hostess and Modeling Service, organizer of Miss Corporate Nigeria.

== Editions ==
=== Location and date ===
The following list is the edition detail of the Miss Grand Nigeria contest, since its inception in 2015.

Edition	Date	Final venue	Entrants	Ref.
1st	11 September 2015	Orchid Hotels & Events Centre, Lekki, Lagos	15	
2nd	11 September 2016	Victoria Crown Plaza Hotel, Victoria Island, Lagos	18	
3rd	1 November 2016	Victoria Crown Plaza Hotel, Victoria Island, Lagos		

=== Competition result ===
Edition	Winner	Runners-up		Ref.
Edition	Winner	First	Second	Ref.
1st	Ifeoma Jennifer Ohia (Plateau)	Fumnaya Victoria Okafor (Abia)	Joy Ebaide Udoh (Edo)	
2nd	Rachael Onuwa Ikekhuame (Edo)	Emmanuella Yaboh (Imo)	Amanosi Kadiri (Rivers)	
3rd	TBA	TBA	TBA	

== International competition ==
The following is a list of Nigerian representatives at the Miss Grand International contest.

Color keys

- : Declared as the winner
- : Ended as a runner-up (Top 5)
- : Ended as a finalist (Top 10)
- : Ended as a semifinalist (Top 20/21)
- : Ended as special awards winner

Year	Miss Grand Nigeria	Title	Placement	Special Awards	National Director
2027	Grace Ekrakene	Miss Grand Nigeria 2027 (Note: Main title in the Miss Corporate Nigeria 2026 pageant.)	TBA		Jasper Salami
2026	Uzogheli Ifeoma	Top 10 Miss World Nigeria 2026	Top 25		Jasper Salami
2025	Joy Omachonu	Miss Grand Nigeria 2025 (Note: Main title in the Miss Corporate Nigeria 2025 pageant.)	Unplaced		Jasper Salami
2024	Roseline Orji	Miss Grand Nigeria 2024 (Note: Main title in the Game of Crowns 2024 pageant.)	Unplaced		Santiago Roberts
2023	Boma Dokubo	Appointed	Top 20	Best National Costume	Santiago Roberts
2022	Damilola Bolarinde	The Nigerian Queen 2022	Top 20		Kelvin Joseph Amroma
2021	Abimbola Islamiat Rita Abayomi	The Nigerian Queen 2021	Did not compete		Kelvin Joseph Amroma
2021	Patience Chenema Christopher	2nd runner-up The Nigerian Queen 2021	Top 20		Kelvin Joseph Amroma
2020	Chikaodili Enobong Nna-Udosen	The Nigerian Queen 2020	Unplaced		Kelvin Joseph Amroma
2019	Favour Oonye Ocheche	Appointed	Unplaced		Ibinabo Fiberesima
Did not compete in 2018
2017	Princess Omowunmi Agunbiade	Appointed	Unplaced		Queen Loveth Ajufoh
2016	Rachel Onuwa Ikekhuame	Miss Grand Nigeria 2016	Unplaced		Queen Loveth Ajufoh
2015	Ifeoma Jennifer Ohia	Miss Grand Nigeria 2015	Unplaced		Queen Loveth Ajufoh
2014	Tessy Kiri Bibowei	Appointed	Unplaced		Ibinabo Fiberesima
2013	Marian Usinzibe Makbere	Appointed	Did not compete		Marian Usinzibe Makbere

== Winner Gallery ==
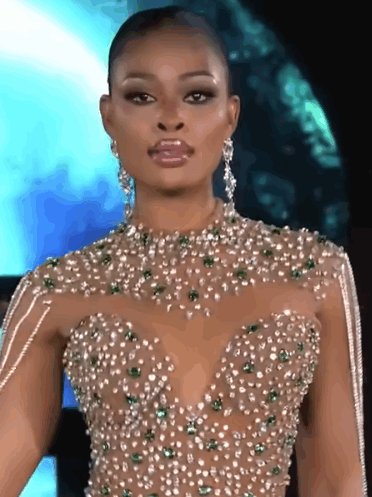
Miss Grand Nigeria 2025
Joy Omachonu

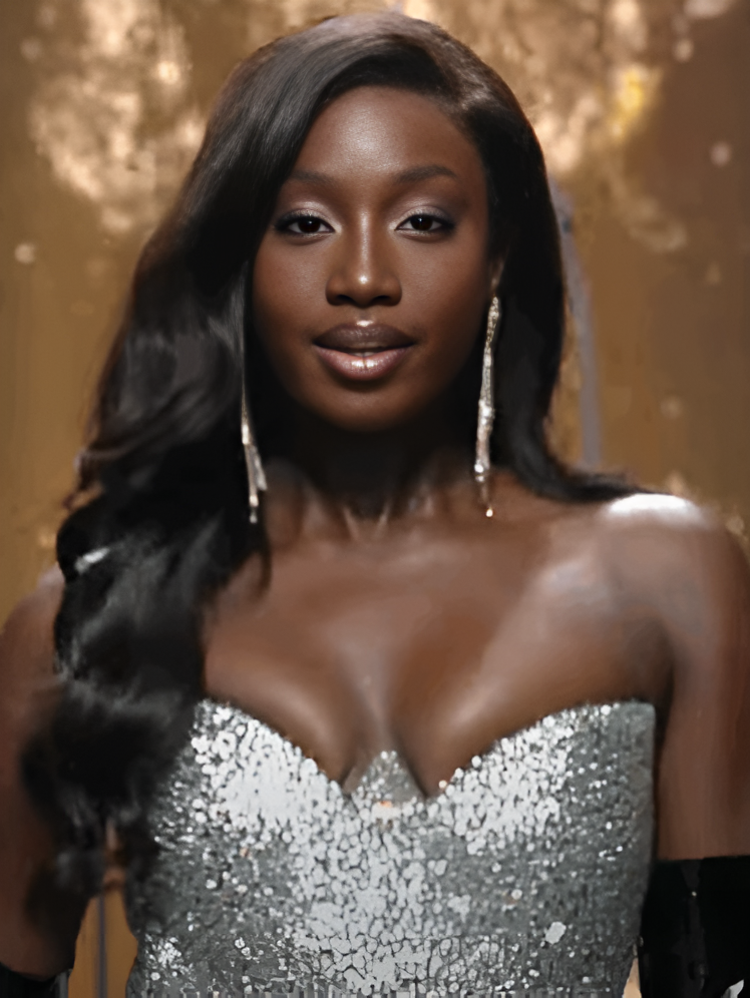
Miss Grand Nigeria 2024
Roseline Orji

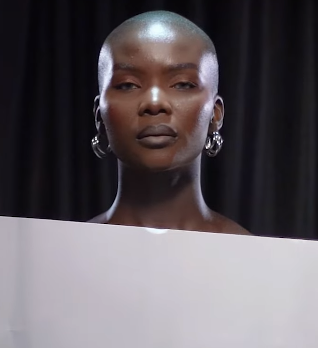
Miss Grand Nigeria 2023
Boma Dokubo

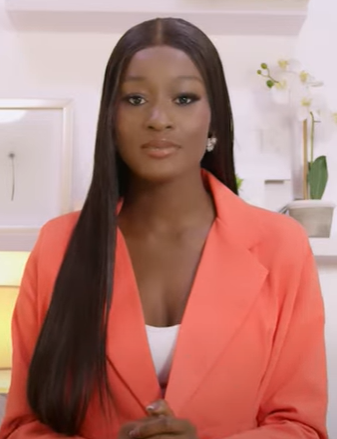
Miss Grand Nigeria 2022
Damilola Bolarinde

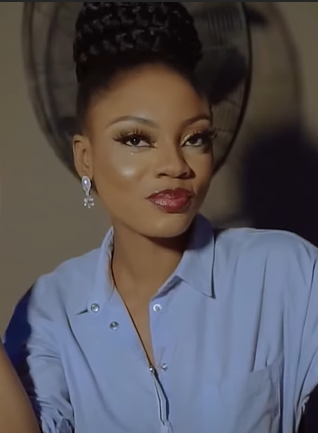
Miss Grand Nigeria 2021
Patience Christopher

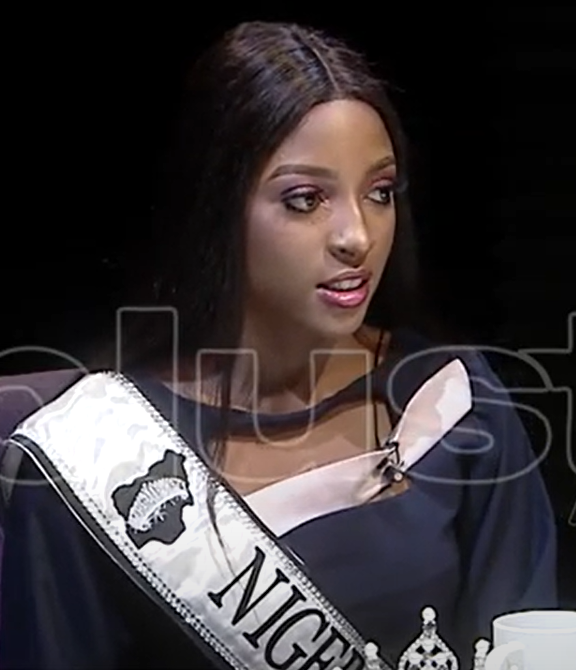
Miss Grand Nigeria 2020
Chikaodili Nna-Udosen

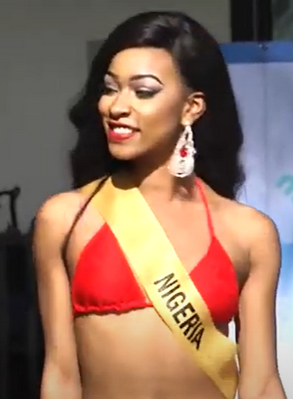
Miss Grand Nigeria 2015
Ifeoma Ohia

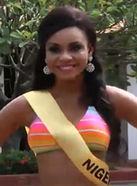
Miss Grand Nigeria 2014
Tessy Bibowei
