= Grace Richardson (model) =

English beauty pageant titleholder

- Born: 2004 or 2005 (age 20–21); Leicester, England
- Education: Leicester College of Performing Arts
- Occupations: Student; model; performer
- Beauty pageant titleholder
- Title: Miss Leicestershire 2024; Miss East Midlands 2025; Miss England 2025
- Major competitions: Miss England 2025; (Winner); Miss World 2026; (Top 40)

Grace Richardson (born c. 2004/2005) is an English model and beauty pageant titleholder who was crowned Miss England 2025. She is the first openly gay woman to win the national title.

== Early life and education ==
Richardson was raised in Leicester, Leicestershire. She attended local schools in Leicestershire and pursued training in performing arts and musical theatre at the Leicester College of Performing Arts (LCPA).

Richardson came out as gay at age 15. She has spoken publicly about experiencing homophobic bullying during her school years and has cited her experiences as motivation to advocate for LGBTQ+ youth visibility.

== Pageantry ==
=== Early titles ===
Richardson began competing in pageantry in 2024, securing the regional title of Miss Leicestershire. The following year, she was crowned Miss East Midlands 2025, granting her entry to the national final.

=== Miss England 2025 ===
On 21 November 2025, Richardson represented the East Midlands at the Miss England national finals held at Grand Station in Wolverhampton. During the competition, she won the talent category with a singing performance of "Never Enough" from The Greatest Showman, having transitioned to a vocal routine after sustaining a foot injury that prevented her from performing a planned ballet piece.

At the conclusion of the event, Richardson was crowned Miss England 2025. Her victory marked the first time in the history of the Miss England competition that an openly gay contestant won the crown.

=== Miss World 2026 ===
As Miss England 2025, Richardson was selected to represent England at the Miss World 2026 pageant. Through her reign, she raised £42,000 for "Beauty with a Purpose", the official charitable organization of Miss World.

Awards and achievements
Preceded by Charlotte Grant	Miss England; 2025	Incumbent
