= Valeriia Lisovska =

Ukrainian model and beauty pageant titleholder

- Валерія Лісовська
- Born: April 5, 2007 (age 19); Odesa, Ukraine
- Education: International Humanitarian University
- Occupations: Student; model
- Beauty pageant titleholder
- Title: Vice Miss South Ukraine 2025; Miss Ukraine 2025
- Major competitions: Miss Ukraine 2025; (Winner); Miss World 2026; (Top 20)

Valeriia Lisovska (in Ukrainian: Валерія Лісовська; born 5 April 2007) is a Ukrainian beauty pageant titleholder, model, and university student who was crowned Miss Ukraine 2025. She represented Ukraine at the Miss World 2026 pageant.

== Early life and education ==
Lisovska was born in Odesa, Ukraine. She pursued her higher education at the International Humanitarian University in Odesa, majoring in International Economic Relations. Aside from her academic studies, she studied acting, dancing, and journalism, and is fluent in both English and French. She also plays competitive tennis.

== Pageantry ==
=== Early competitions ===
In 2024, Lisovska competed in her university's beauty contest, "Miss International Humanitarian University 2025". In July 2025, she won the title of Vice Miss South Ukraine 2025 within the Miss Odesa pageant, which qualified her to compete at the national level.

=== Miss Ukraine 2025 ===
On 13 December 2025, Lisovska competed at the Miss Ukraine 2025 national finals in Kyiv. The winner was chosen through a combination of professional jury scoring and public online voting.

At the conclusion of the event, Lisovska was crowned Miss Ukraine 2025 by outgoing titleholder Maria Melnychenko. She was presented with a newly designed crown encrusted with blue sapphires, symbolizing a peaceful sky, and white gems, representing the resilience of Ukrainian women.

During her reign, Lisovska engaged in charity initiatives, including fundraising campaigns for NGO "Zemlyachky" to secure protective military equipment for female Ukrainian defenders.

=== Miss World 2026 ===
As the winner of Miss Ukraine 2025, Lisovska earned the right to represent Ukraine at the Miss World 2026 competition, where she made the top 20.

Awards and achievements
Preceded by Maria Melnychenko	Miss Ukraine; 2025	Incumbent
