= Miss Grand Nigeria 2015 =

1st Miss Grand Nigeria competition, beauty pageant edition

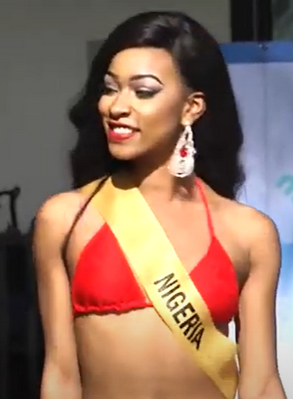
- Ifeoma Jennifer Ohia, the winner of the contest
- Date: 11 September 2015
- Presenters: Kenneth Okolie; Olabisi Omidire
- Entertainment: Dammy Krane; CDQ; Base One; Kenny Blaq; DJ Snatch; Two Sec; Que Peller
- Venue: Orchid Hotels & Events Centre, Lekki, Lagos
- Broadcaster: YouTube
- Entrants: 15
- Placements: 10
- Winner: Ifeoma Jennifer Ohia (Plateau)
- Miss Ecowas: Joy Ebaide Udoh (Edo)
- Miss Tourism: Fumnanya Victoria Okafor (Abia)

Miss Grand Nigeria 2015 was the inaugural edition of the Miss Grand Nigeria beauty pageant, held on September 11, 2015, at Orchid Hotels & Events Centre in Lekki, Lagos. Candidates from fifteen states of Nigeria competed for the title and the representative of Plateau State, Ifeoma Jennifer Ohia, was named the winner and received one million Nigerian naira cash prize as a reward. She then represented the country at the Miss Grand International 2015 in Thailand, but she was unplaced.

The grand final of the pageant was hosted by Kenneth Okolie and Olabisi Omidire, and was highlighted by a live performance of several artists such as, Dammy Krane, CDQ, Base One, Kenny Blaq, DJ Snatch, Two Sec, and Que Peller. The event was live-transmitted to the audience worldwide via the organizer's YouTube channel.

The panel of judges was led by Nollywood star Tonto Dikeh, Media Mogul Olisa Adibua, Photographer Shola Blowgun, and national pageant director of Miss Grand Nigeria Queen Loveth Ajufoh.

== Result ==
| Position | Candidate |
|---|---|
| Miss Grand Nigeria 2015 | Plateau – Ifeoma Jennifer Ohia |
| 1st runner-up | Abia – Fumnanya Victoria Okafor |
| 2nd runner-up | Edo – Joy Ebaide Udoh |
| Top 5 | Delta – Dike Chiwendu Vivian; Lagos – Olamide Daphne Areyinka |
| Top 10 | Abuja – Otokpa John Comfort; Anambra – Theresa Chidinma Nwagulu; Cross River – Omoye Loveth Zibiri; Enugu – Blessing Nkem Nwachukwu; Osun – Wunmi Aisat Ogunseitan |
Special awards
| Miss Grand Ecowas | Edo – Joy Ebaide Udoh |
| Miss Grand Tourism | Abia – Fumnanya Victoria Okafor |
| Best Evening Gown | Cross River – Omoye Loveth Zibiri |
| Best National Costume | Cross River – Omoye Loveth Zibiri |
| People Choice | Anambra – Theresa Chidinma Nwagulu |

== Candidates ==
Miss Grand Nigeria 2015 competition result by state
Color keys:

| Winner 1st runner-up 2nd runner-up Did not compete | Top 5 Top 10 Unplaced |

Fifteen candidates competed for the title of Miss Grand Nigeria 2015.

- Abuja – Otokpa John Comfort
- Abia – Fumnanya Victoria Okafor
- Akwa Ibom – Jessica Antak Nelson
- Anambra – Theresa Chidinma Nwagulu
- Bayelsa – Agboje Jennifer Onoh
- Cross River – Omoye Loveth Zibiri
- Delta – Dike Chiwendu Vivian
- Edo – Joy Ebaide Udoh
- Enugu – Blessing Nkem Nwachukwu
- Kaduna – Obiora Nadia
- Lagos – Olamide Daphne Areyinka
- Ogun – Adegbenro Risquat Yetunde
- Osun – Wunmi Aisat Ogunseitan
- Plateau – Ifeoma Jennifer Ohia
- Rivers – Edidiong Anthony Umoren
