= Trivia Elle Muhoza =

Ugandan beauty pageant titleholder

- Education: Uganda Aviation Academy
- Beauty pageant titleholder
- Title: Miss Uganda 2025

Trivia Elle Muhoza, is a Ugandan beauty pageant titleholder who won Miss Uganda 2025. She represented Uganda at Miss World 2026 in Vietnam, where a gown she wore depicting the tissue layers cut during a caesarean section was widely reported in the international press and drew attention from World Health Organization Director-general Tedros Adhanom Ghebreyesus.

Her pageant platform focused on single mothers, particularly women who have experienced domestic violence.

== Early life and education ==
Muhoza's family comes from Butanga village in Butenga parish, Bukomansimbi District. She grew up in Kampala and attended Nakasero Primary School, Namirembe Infants School and Namirembe Parents School before going on to Seroma High School and Kisubi High School for her secondary education. While at Seroma, she was first runner-up at the Miss High School contest.

She later trained at the Uganda Aviation Academy in Kampala, where she was named the best student of her class in 2024. Pulse Uganda reported that she also received a merit recognition from the International Air Transport Association. In an interview after her Miss Uganda win, she said an early attempt at modelling had not gone well, and that the setback was part of what led her to enter the national pageant.

== Pageantry ==
Muhoza represented Bukomansimbi District as one of 25 finalists and won Miss Uganda 2025, at the Sheraton Kampala Hotel on 20 September 2025. In the question-and-answer round, asked how she would encourage Ugandans to keep their cities clean, she said she would promote recycling. Asked which problem she would take on as Miss Uganda, she named gender-based violence. She succeeding Natasha Nyonyozi, and received a car and a cash prize of five million shillings from the pageant's main sponsor, V&A Sherry. Agatha Drakes Keine was first runner-up and Faith Kirabo second runner-up.

Muhoza competed at Miss World 2026, at Nha Trang, Vietnam, on 5 September 2026, and did not reach the top 40. Her Beauty with a Purpose project, "Wings of Hope", was run through her Empowering Mothers in Uganda initiative and dealt with domestic violence and women's economic dependence. It was selected as one of six African finalists in the Beauty with a Purpose challenge. The African continental award went to Brunette Makanyiso of Zimbabwe. She was also among the five African finalists in the Multimedia challenge.

==== "The Layers of Life" gown ====
For the World Designer Award segment, Muhoza wore "The Layers of Life", a gown by the Ugandan designer Keesha Abdallah, founder of the label Keesha. Abdallah based the design on a medical illustration of the seven layers a surgeon cuts through during a caesarean delivery: skin, fat, fascia, the rectus muscles, peritoneum, uterine muscle and the amniotic sac. The gown was made from stretch satin and layered tulle. Its colours moved from peach and gold through coral and red to maroon and burgundy, with pearls, glass beads and crystals added as embellishment. Abdallah said her own recent experience of becoming a mother had shaped the idea.

Photographs of the gown circulated widely online, and it was covered by outlets in the Gulf, the United States, India and West Africa. On 3 September 2026, Tedros Adhanom Ghebreyesus wrote on social media that the gown drew attention to the realities of caesarean childbirth while honouring the mothers who go through it. Muhoza later told the Daily Monitor that she had not expected the gown to attract so much attention. The African prize in the World Designer Award went to Shreeya Bokhoree of Mauritius.

Muhoza crowned her successor, Almorie Nagayi, at the Miss Uganda 2026 final in October 2026.

== Advocacy and other work ==
During her reign Muhoza spoke publicly about domestic violence, arguing that it includes financial and sexual abuse as well as physical violence. In December 2025 she took part in a Christmas donation drive for families in Katanga, an informal settlement in Kawempe Division, organised by Faith Life Church with the Fairfield Charity Organisation. In May 2026 she visited communities in Kabale and Rubanda districts to talk with girls about menstrual hygiene and to hand out reusable sanitary pads.

In August 2026 she published SPO!LER Alert – You Survived, a book drawing on her own experiences of hardship and recovery, at an event called the "Healing Gala" at the Mestil Hotel in Kampala. The launch also served as her official send-off to Miss World. Muhoza is also the founder of Elle Lip Care, a lip-care and cosmetics brand.

Awards and achievements
| Preceded by Natasha Nyonyozi | Miss Uganda; 2025 | Succeeded by Almorie Nagayi |
