= Miss World Guinea-Bissau =

Beauty pageant

- Formation: 2013
- Type: Beauty pageant
- Headquarters: Bissau
- Location: Guinea-Bissau
- Members: Miss World
- Official language: Portuguese

Miss World Guinea-Bissau is a national Beauty pageant in Guinea-Bissau. The winner of this pageant goes to compete at Miss World pageant.

== History ==
Miss World Guinea-Bissau pageant was launched in 2013, It was also the first year country sent its first representative to the Miss World pageant.

== Miss World Guinea-Bissau ==
Color key

- Declared as Winner
- Ended as runner-up
- Ended as one of the finalists or semifinalists

Year	Miss World Guinea-Bissau	Placement	Special Awards
2013	Heny Tavares		
2016	Sandra Araújo		
2018	Rubiato Nhamajo		
2019	Leila Samati		
2021	Itchacénia Da Costa		
2022	Miss World 2021 was rescheduled to 16 March 2022 due to the COVID-19 pandemic outbreak in Puerto Rico, no edition started in 2022		
2023	Mirla Ferreira Dabó		
2026	Hernânia Nantote		
2027	TBA	TBA	
