= Leakena In =

Cambodian beauty pageant titleholder

- Born: January 1, 2002 (age 24); Phnom Penh,Cambodia
- Beauty pageant titleholder
- Title: Miss Grand Kampong Cham 2021; Miss Supranational Cambodia 2022; Miss Grand Pailin 2023; Miss Cosmo Cambodia 2024; Miss World Cambodia 2026
- Major competitions: Miss Universe Cambodia 2019 (Unplaced); Miss World Cambodia 2019 (1st Runner-up); Miss Grand Cambodia 2021 (1st Runner-up); Miss Supranational 2022 (Unplaced); Miss Grand Cambodia 2023 (2nd Runner-up); Miss Cosmo 2024 (Top 10); (Cosmo Social Ambassador); Miss World 2026 (Top 40)

Leakena In (Khmer: អ៊ិន លក្ខិណា) is a Cambodian model and beauty pageant titleholder who was crowned Miss World Cambodia 2026. She previously represented Cambodia at the inaugural Miss Cosmo 2024 pageant, where she placed in the top 10 finalists. She represented her country at Miss World 2026 in Vietnam, where she secured a spot in the Top 40 after winning the Asia & Oceania People’s Choice Award. She became the first Cambodian to advance to the semifinals.

== Pageantry ==
Miss World Cambodia 2019

leakhena In is a first runner up (Second Place) of Miss world Cambodia 2019.

=== Miss Grand Cambodia 2021 ===
In made her debut in major national pageantry at the Miss Grand Cambodia 2021 competition, representing Kampong Cham province. She finished as the first runner-up to the eventual winner, Pokimtheng Sothida.

=== Miss Supranational 2022 ===
Following her placement, she was officially appointed as Miss Supranational Cambodia 2022. She traveled to Poland to compete in Miss Supranational 2022, but due to severe visa processing delays, she missed the essential preliminary sub-competitions and ultimately finished unplaced.

=== Miss Grand Cambodia 2023 ===
In 2023, In returned to the national stage, representing Pailin province at Miss Grand Cambodia 2023. She secured another podium finish, placing as the second runner-up.

=== Miss Cosmo 2024 ===
In 2024, she was crowned Miss Cosmo Cambodia 2024, becoming the country's first-ever representative to the inaugural Miss Cosmo international pageant held in Ho Chi Minh City, Vietnam. She achieved a Top 10 placement and was honored with the Cosmo Social Ambassador special award.

=== Miss World 2026 ===
The Miss World Cambodia organization officially announced In Leakena as the country's delegate for Miss World 2026. She represented Cambodia at the 75th anniversary edition of the Miss World pageant held in Vietnam. Her "Beauty with a Purpose" advocacy project focuses on "Empowering Communities Through Education and Opportunity," aiming to improve educational access and resources for underprivileged youth. She later secured Cambodia’s first placement in the Top 40 after winning the Asia & Oceania People’s Choice Award.

Awards and achievements
| Preceded by Julia Russell | Miss World Cambodia; 2026 | Succeeded by Incumbent |
| Preceded by Inaugural | Cosmo Social Ambassador; 2024 | Succeeded by Myint Myat Moe |
| Preceded by Inaugural | Miss Cosmo Cambodia; 2024 | Succeeded by Sreypii Phorn |
| Preceded by Inaugural | Miss Supranational Cambodia; 2022 | Succeeded by Chily Tevy |
