= Lina Teoh =

Malaysian model (born 1976)

- Born: Lina Teoh Pick Lim; 8 July 1976 (age 50); Melbourne, Australia
- Education: Australian Institute of Dramatic Arts
- Height: 5 ft 7.8 in (1.72 m)
- Spouse: Jamie Quah
- Children: 2
- Beauty pageant titleholder
- Title: Miss World Malaysia 1998; Miss World Asia & Oceania
- Hair colour: Brunette
- Eye colour: Brown
- Major competitions: Miss World Malaysia 1998 (Winner); Miss World 1998 (2nd Runner-up)

Lina Teoh Pick Lim (born 7 July 1976) is a Malaysian actress, tv host, model and beauty pageant titleholder who was crowned Miss Malaysia World 1998. She represented Malaysia at Miss World 1998 in Mahé, Seychelles where she placed as second runner up.

== Personal life ==
Born in Melbourne, Australia to a Malaysian Chinese father and a Dutch mother, Teoh spent most of her adult life in Malacca and Kuala Lumpur, Malaysia. In her late teens and 20s she has traveled extensively throughout South East Asia modeling in tv commercials and print/press ads for many high-profile brands, as well as on the runway. Teoh was trained in Show Biz Dance Academy in 1980-1992 where she studied 12 years of jazz ballet. She finished her study in Australian Institute of Dramatic Arts in 1998.

Over the years she has hosted many television programs in Malaysia including Watch-U-Want for Channel V, a Malaysian tourism series, a sports series, a business series, a motivational talk show and a woman's talk show.

== Pageantry ==
=== Miss World 1998 ===
Teoh became Miss World Malaysia 1998 and went on to represent Malaysia in the international Miss World 1998 competition in Seychelles. Teoh spent a week in Paris and then 3 weeks on the Island of Mahe, where the finals were held. Competing against 93 other girls from all over the world. Teoh eventually placed as 2nd Runner-Up behind the grand winner Linor Abargil of Israel and 1st Runner-Up Véronique Caloc of France. She was declared as Miss World Asia and Oceania 1998. It is also the highest achievement ever by a Malaysian contestant at the Miss World pageant (as of 2026), until Taanusiya Chetty achieved the same placement in 2026.

== Acting stints ==
Teoh had a leading role in the local English sitcom Kopitiam as Susan Lau, a snooty Singaporean lawyer. She also played a neurotic librarian in theatre production Forever Tyreen and a singer in the multi-media play Light Bulbs. The role gave her the honor of receiving a runner-up “Best Actress” award at the Asian Television Awards and a lifelong friendship with many of the cast and crew and with her castmate Douglas Lim, nominated as "Best Actor".

Teoh also produced documentary A Leader’s Legacy: Tun Abdul Razak on National Geographic Channel.

Awards and achievements
Preceded by (India) Diana Hayden	Miss World Asia & Oceania; 1998	Succeeded by (India) Yukta Mookhey
Preceded by (South Africa) Jessica Motaung	Miss World (2nd Runner-Up); 1998	Succeeded by (South Africa) Sonia Raciti
