= Maja Todd =

Polish beauty pageant titleholder

- Born: April 13, 2005 (age 21); Katowice, Poland
- Education: SGH Warsaw School of Economics
- Occupations: Student; lifeguard; vocalist
- Height: 1.80 m (5 ft 11 in)
- Beauty pageant titleholder
- Title: Miss Polonia 2025
- Major competitions: Miss Polonia 2025; (Winner); Miss International 2025; (Unplaced); Miss World 2026; (Top 40)

Maja Magaloma Todd (born 13 April 2005) is a Polish beauty pageant titleholder, model, and vocalist who was crowned Miss Polonia 2025. She represented Poland at Miss International 2025 in Tokyo, Japan, and was designated to represent her country at Miss World 2026.

== Early life and education ==
Todd was raised in Katowice, Poland, and spent part of her childhood living in Great Britain due to her Polish-English background.

She trained as a swimmer for many years and earned certification as a professional lifeguard. In 2024, she enrolled at the SGH Warsaw School of Economics in Warsaw. Outside of her studies, Todd is a vocalist influenced by soul and R&B music.

== Pageantry ==
=== Miss Polonia 2025 ===
On 22 June 2025, Todd competed in the Miss Polonia 2025 national finale in Warsaw against 23 other contestants. During the preliminary events, she won the Miss Talent preliminary award. At the end of the broadcast event, she was crowned Miss Polonia 2025 by her predecessor Maja Klajda.

=== Miss International 2025 ===
Following her national win, Todd was selected to represent Poland at the 63rd edition of Miss International 2025 in Tokyo, Japan, on 27 November 2025. In Japan, she participated in official events including the "Beauties for SDGs" program and placed in the top 12 of the Miss Talent competition performing "Hero" by Mariah Carey.

=== Miss World 2026 ===
Todd was named Poland's candidate for Miss World 2026. In August 2026, she traveled to Vietnam to represent Poland at the international pageant.

Awards and achievements
Preceded by Maja Klajda	Miss Polonia; 2025	Incumbent
