= Miss Grand Nigeria 2016 =

Nigerian beauty pageant edition

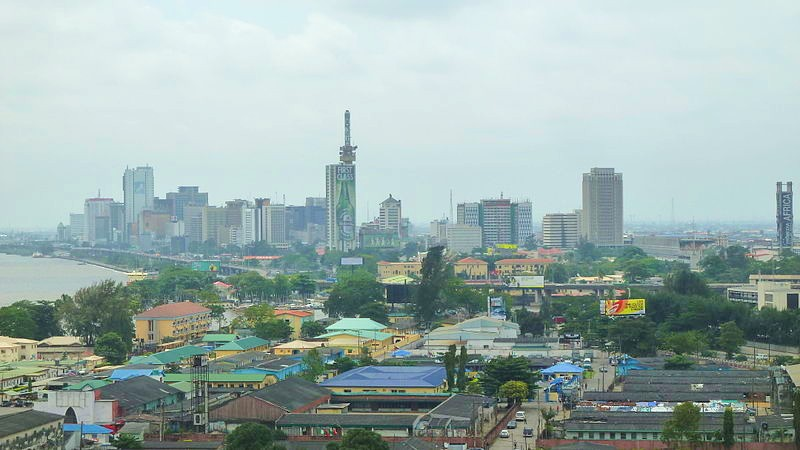
- Victoria Island, the host city of the contest
- Date: 11 September 2016
- Venue: Victoria Crown Plaza Hotel, Victoria Island, Lagos
- Broadcaster: YouTube
- Entrants: 18
- Placements: 10
- Winner: Racheal Ikekhuame (Edo)

Miss Grand Nigeria 2016 was the second edition of the Miss Grand Nigeria beauty pageant, held on September 11, 2016, at the Victoria Crown Plaza Hotel, Victoria Island, Lagos. Candidates from eighteen states of Nigeria competed for the title and the representative of Edo State, Rachael Onuwa Ikekhuame, was named the winner and received one million Nigerian naira cash prize as a reward. She then represented the country at the Miss Grand International 2016 pageant in Las Vegas, United States, but she was unplaced.

The grand final round of the pageant was hosted by comedian Akinlami Babatunde Julius (also known as Elenu) and radio personality Double O.

== Result ==
Position	Candidate
Miss Grand Nigeria 2016	Edo – Racheal Ikekhuame
1st runner-up	Imo – Emmanuella Yaboh
2nd runner-up	Rivers – Amanosi Kadiri
Top 5	Lagos – Adeola Ayomide Abayomi; Cross River – Blessing Onyeka Enuanwa
Top 10	Abia – Oluwadamiola Abisoye Hassan; Benue – Ogbanga Tamunosiki Rita; Kaduna – Arikawe Sharon Oluwatunmise; Ogun – Princess Omowunmi Agunbiade; Plateau – Vivian Urefine Precious
Special awards
Best National Costume	Cross River – Blessing Onyeka Enuanwa
Best Evening Gown	Imo – Emmanuella Yaboh
Best Talent	Kaduna – Arikawe Sharon Oluwatunmise
Best Speech	Rivers – Amanosi Kadiri
People Choice	Abia – Oluwadamiola Abisoye Hassan
Miss Congeniality	Cross River – Blessing Onyeka Enuanwa

== Candidates ==
Miss Grand Nigeria 2016 competition result by state
Color keys:

Winner 1st runner-up 2nd runner-up Did not compete	Top 5 Top 10 Unplaced

Eighteen candidates competed for the title of Miss Grand Nigeria 2016.

- Abia – Oluwadamiola Abisoye Hassan
- Abuja – Mbonu Nina Gift
- Akwa Ibom – Anita Tartiyana Idiong
- Anambra – Victoria Chioma Molokwu
- Bayelsa – Deborah Ibeinmo Alfred
- Benue – Ogbanga Tamunosiki Rita
- Cross River – Blessing Onyeka Enuanwa
- Delta – Thelma Ifechukwude Ojei
- Ebonyi – Blessing Ashionye Ebogu
- Edo – Racheal Ikekhuame
- Ekiti – Okoye Chisom Maryfrances
- Imo – Emmanuella Bolouere Yaboh
- Kaduna – Arikawe Sharon Oluwatunmise
- Lagos – Adeola Ayomide Abayomi
- Ogun – Princess Omowunmi Agunbiade
- Ondo – Chime Onyinye
- Plateau – Vivian Urefine Precious
- Rivers – Amanosi Omogbai Kadiri
