= Alina Akselrad =

Argentine beauty pageant titleholder

- Born: Córdoba, Argentina
- Beauty pageant titleholder
- Title: Miss Sudamérica 2017; Miss Universe Argentina 2020; Miss World Argentina 2025
- Major competitions: Miss Universe Argentina 2019 (Top 7); Miss Universe 2020 (Top 21); Miss World 2026 (Top 20)

Alina Akselrad is an Argentine beauty pageant titleholder who won Miss World Argentina 2025. She was previously appointed Miss Universe Argentina 2020 and competed at Miss Universe 2020, where she reached the top 21. She represented her country at Miss World 2026, where she finished in the Top 20.

== Pageantry ==
Alina Akselrad entered her first local pageant when she was 16 years old. She first won regional queen of the Milk Glass Civil Association. Afterward, she participated at the National Fruit and Vegetable Queen activities at Colonia Caroya in 2016, Miss Sudamérica 2017, and finally Miss Tourism World in 2018. In 2019, Akselrad was chosen as a contestant for Miss Universe Argentina 2019, and reached the top seven. The following year, Akselrad was appointed Miss Universe Argentina 2020 and represented her country at Miss Universe 2020, and reached the top 21. In 2025, Akselrad entered and won Miss World Argentina 2025, representing Córdoba. She was crowned by the outgoing titleholder, Guadalope Alomar, and went on to represent Argentina at the Miss World 2026 pageant in Vietnam, where she finished in the Top 20. She became the 16th Argentine to reach the semifinals.

== Advocacy ==
Akselrad created "Grab Your Strength", a project that promotes actions related to personality development, understanding of current issues, building social commitment from time to time. childhood and awarded to those who, faced with adversity in life, learned how to overcome and overcome difficulties.

Awards and achievements
Preceded by Mariana Varela	Miss Universe Argentina; 2020	Succeeded by Julieta García
Preceded by Guadalope Alomar	Miss World Argentina; 2026	Incumbent
