= Romanda Hombir =

South Africa beauty pageant titleholder

- Born: Romanda Hombir; 1999 (age 26–27); Mbombela, Mpumalanga, South Africa
- Education: University of Pretoria; University of Cape Town
- Occupations: Model; audiologist; philanthropist
- Height: 1.76 m (5 ft 9 in)
- Beauty pageant titleholder
- Title: Miss World South Africa 2026; Miss World Africa 2026
- Major competitions: Miss World South Africa 2024; (2nd Runner-Up); Miss World South Africa 2026; (Winner); Miss World 2026; (Top 6); (Miss World Africa)

Romanda Hombir (/roʊˈmændə ˈhɒmbɪər/ roh-MAN-duh HOM-beer; born 1999) is a South African model, audiologist, philanthropist and beauty pageant titleholder who won Miss World South Africa 2026. She represented the South Africa at Miss World 2026 in Nha Trang, Vietnam. She was placed in the Top 6 and crowned the winner of Miss World Africa 2026.

== Life and career ==
Hombir was born in 1999, in Mpumalanga, South Africa. Her father hails from Germany with German heritage, while her mother has Swati and Zulu roots. Her mother is black, while her father is coloured. Hombir has stated that from the age of 10 she wanted to make a difference through a career in healthcare or in public life.

Hombir graduated from the University of Pretoria where she obtained Bachelor of Arts in Audiology and working at the Edenvale Hospital. In 2024, she was studying Master in Audiology from the University of Cape Town. She is a qualified clinical audiologist, motivational speaker and a philanthropist, and she founded her own organization Caring With Purpose.

== Pageantry ==
=== Miss World South Africa 2024 ===
Hombir began her pageantry career in 2024, when she joined the Miss World South Africa 2024. During the final of the competition, she was crowned the 2nd Runner-up and was representing the Mpumalanga province.

=== Miss World South Africa 2026 ===
In May 2026, Hombir joined Miss African Beauty South Africa competition, where she was competing for three titles and included in the top 30. In June, she was included in the top 20 of the competition after Shannon Benting was crowned the winner of Miss African Beauty Supranational 2026. On 18 July 2026, she won Miss World South Africa 2026. She was crowned the winner the same day with Bajabulise Thela, Miss African Beauty South Africa 2026.

==== Controversy ====
The controversy surrounding Hombir, centers on her mixed heritage. Social media users are intensely debating her nationality and tribal roots due to her surname, which has sparked heated discussions about identity and who is "truly" South African. Following her victory, online critics began investigating her Swati, Zulu and German background, questioning whether she authentically represents the country–discourse that heavily echoes the xenophobic backlash faced by Chidimma Adetshina in 2024 during Miss South Africa 2024.

=== Miss World 2026 ===
Hombir represented the South Africa at the Miss World 2026 competition in Vietnam in September 2026. She first won the 2026 continental Head-to-Head Challenge and secured her spot in the top 40 and was placed in the Top 21 continental finalists for Top Model Challenge. She wore Madiba dress designed by Hollywood Costumes SA for her national costume that featured a hand painted portrait of Nelson Mandela and gained viral international coverage during the "Dances of the World" showcase. During the coronation gala on 5 September 2026, she advanced continuously through the stages, finishing her run as she was placed in the Top 6. That same night, she was crowned the winner of Miss World Africa 2026, where Joheirry Mola of the Dominican Republic won the title.

== Advocacy ==
Hombir is involved in community health advocacy and she founded a nonprofit organization, the Caring Purpose Foundation. According to published descriptions, the foundation conducts mobile health screenings and skills development initiatives for underserved communities, and runs awareness activities related to women’s health issues including endometriosis, Polyendocrine metabolic ovarian syndrome (PMOS) and uterine fibroids.

Hombir developed the Beauty With a Purpose project. The project includes health screenings, educational programs and partnerships with local organizations. She has expressed an interest in collaborating with the United Nations to support work in healthcare, education and nutrition on a global level.

== Personal life ==
=== Health ===
Hombir has publicly discussed her health. She stated that she was diagnosed with endometriosis and Polyendocrine metabolic ovarian syndrome (PMOS). According to her account, the diagnoses presented significant challenges during her career and nearly prevented her from competing.

Awards and achievements
| Preceded by (Ethiopia) Hasset Dereje | Miss World Africa; 2026 | Succeeded by Incumbent |
| Preceded by Zoalize Jansen van Rensburg | Miss World South Africa; 2026 | Succeeded by Incumbent |
