= Miss World Guinea =

Beauty pageant

- Formation: 2013
- Type: Beauty pageant
- Headquarters: Conakry
- Location: Guinea
- Members: Miss World
- Official language: French

Miss World Guinea is a national beauty pageant in Guinea. The winner of this pageant competes in the Miss World pageant.

== History ==
The Miss World Guinea pageant was launched in 2013, marking the first year Guinea sent a representative to the Miss World pageant.

== Miss World Guinea ==
Color key

- Declared the Winner
- Finished as Runner-Up
- Reached the Finals or Semifinals

Year	Miss World Guinea	Placement	Special Awards
2013	Mariama Diallo		
2014	Halimatou Diallo		
2015	Mama Aissata Diallo		
2016	Safiatou Baldé		
2017	Asmaou Diallo		
2021	Nene Bah	Top 40	Top 10 at Multimedia
2022	Miss World 2021 was rescheduled to 16 March 2022, due to the COVID-19 pandemic outbreak in Puerto Rico. No edition took place in 2022.		
2023	Makia Bamba		
2025	Kadiatou Savané		
2026	Saran Keita		
