= 2026 International Queen of Coffee =

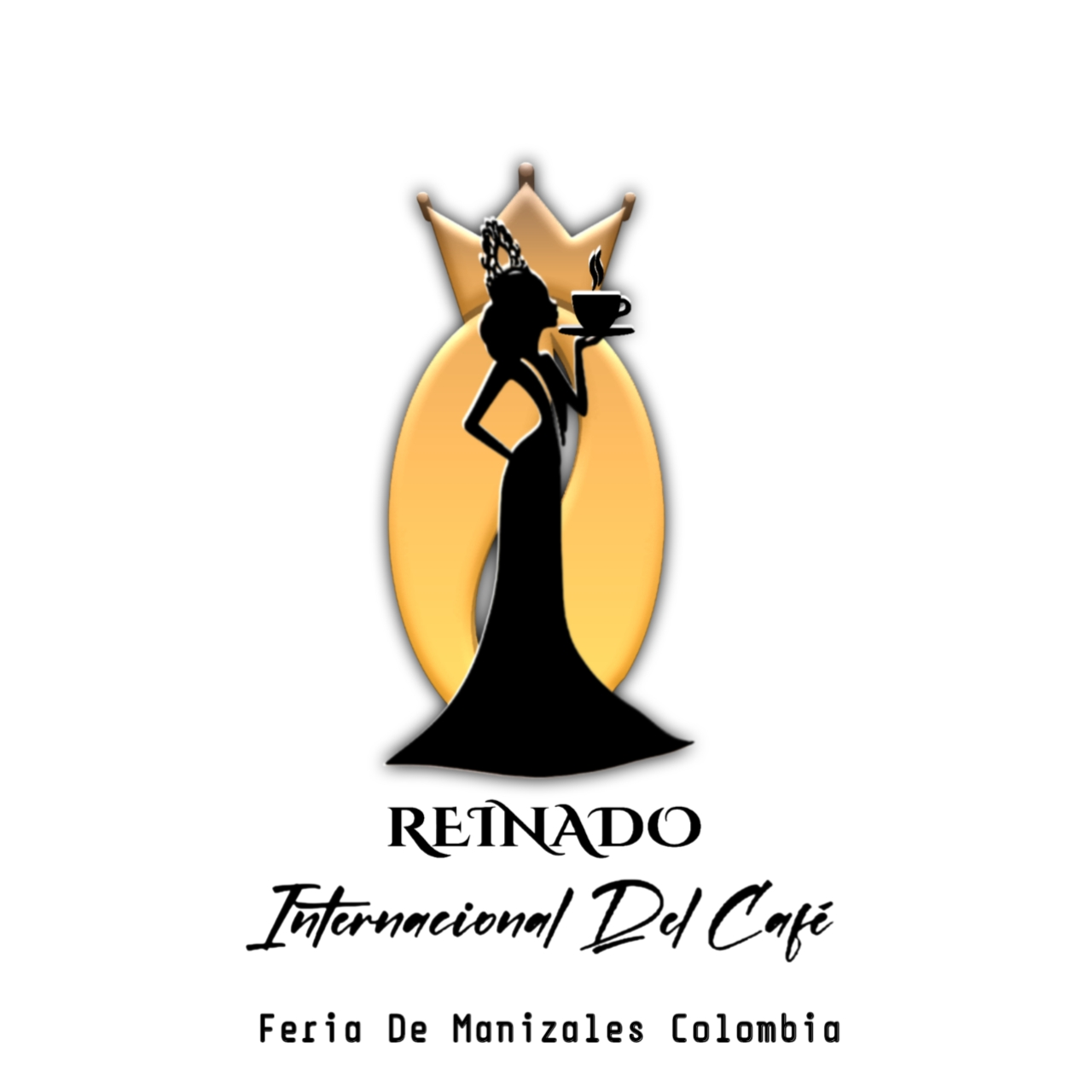
- Date: January 10, 2026
- Presenters: Juan Carlos Giraldo; Katherine Zuluaga; Sebastián Cardona; Vanessa Carvajal
- Entertainment: Sebastián Yepes; Xmosis
- Venue: Teatro Fundadores, Manizales, Colombia
- Broadcaster: Telecafé
- Entrants: 24
- Placements: 5
- Winner: Lady Di Mosquera; Venezuela

The 2026 International Queen of Coffee (Spanish: Reinado Internacional del Café 2026) was the 54th edition of the Reinado Internacional del Café pageant, held at the Teatro Fundadores in Manizales, Colombia, on 10 January 2026.

Cristiane Stipp of Brazil crowned Lady Di Mosquera of Venezuela at the end of the event.

== Background ==
The purpose of the event is to celebrate, within the Feria de Manizales, the cultivation and production of coffee among the countries that send their beauty ambassadors. Manizales has become the industrial hub of Colombia's coffee industry, located in the region now known as the Coffee Axis (Eje Cafetero).

== Results ==
=== Placements ===
Placement	Contestant
Reina Internacional del Café 2026	Venezuela — Lady Di Mosquera
1st Runner-Up	Brazil — Lorena Ohana
2nd Runner-Up	El Salvador — Valeria Amaya
3rd Runner-Up	Mexico — Ruslana Zicaru
4th Runner-Up	Argentina — Melany González

== Contestants ==
24 contestants competed for the title:

Country/Territory	Contestant	Age	Height	Hometown	Region	Occupation	Ref
Argentina	Melany González	22	1.76	Santa Cruz	South America	Cabin Crew student	
Bolivia	Katherinne Yepez	22	1.80	Tarija	South America	Psychology student	
Brazil	Lorena Ohana	27	1.70	Caruaru	South America	Marketing student	
Canada	Jabili Kandula	25	1.71	Mississauga	North America	Aviation Journalist and Private Pilot	
Chile	Andrea Belén Ortíz	25	1.82	Santiago	South America	Journalist	
Colombia	Laura Usme	20	1.73	Honda	South America	Nurse	
Costa Rica	Angelina Santarossa	21	1.65	Puntarenas	Central America	Singer	
Dominican Republic	Aracely Ruiz Paulino	22	1.75	San Pedro de Macorís	Caribbean	Nutritionist	
Ecuador	Valeria Palma Buendia	19	1.74	Daule	South America	Digital Business student	
El Salvador	Valeria Amaya	18	1.72	Santa Tecla	Central America	Model	
France	Zoé Unger	23	1.64	Sundhouse	Europe	Model and Designer	
Guatemala	Melany Morales	21	1.80	Guatemala city	Central America	Model and Digital influencer	
Honduras	Fernanda Castillo	23	1.83	Danlí	Central America	Computer Science studant	
Luxembourg	Angie Albert	21	1.60	Toulouse	Europe	Law and Business student	
Mexico	Ruslana Zicaru	19	1.80	Puerto Vallarta	North America	Marketing student	
Nicaragua	Daniela Majano	25	1.70	Granada	Central America	Designer student	
Panama	Emilie Gabriella Borland	23	1.70	Panama City	Central America	Businessperson	
Peru	Katte Anderson	19	1.70	Oxapampa	South America	Cowgirl	
Poland	Julia Uchrońska	21	1.77	Leśniewo	Europe	Psychologist	
Portugal	Susana Cardoso Delgado	27	1.71	Solveira	Europe	Hair stylist	
Puerto Rico	Brittany Morales	20	1.80	Isabela	Caribbean	Business student and Broadcaster	
Spain	Dayanara Rodríguez	22	1.75	Las Palmas	Europe	Customer service and support	
Uruguay	Valentina Sención	27	1.75	Tacuarembó	South America	Nutritionist	
Venezuela	Lady Di Mosquera	25	1.83	Carora	South America	Social Communication student	
