= Miss World 2026 =

73rd Miss World pageant

- Joheirry Mola
- Date: 5 September 2026
- Presenters: Stephanie Del Valle; Daniel Mejía; Lương Thùy Linh
- Venue: April 2nd Square, Nha Trang, Khánh Hòa, Vietnam
- Entrants: 111
- Placements: 40
- Debuts: Eritrea; French Guiana; Maldives; Mozambique; Pakistan
- Withdrawals: Angola; Armenia; Ecuador; Estonia; Honduras; Madagascar; Moldova; Romania; Suriname; Togo; Tunisia
- Returns: Bahamas; Cook Islands; Guinea-Bissau; Kosovo; Laos; Malawi; Morocco; South Korea; Tanzania
- Winner: Joheirry Mola; Dominican Republic

Miss World 2026 was the 73rd Miss World pageant, held at the April 2nd Square in Nha Trang, Khánh Hòa, Vietnam, on 5 September 2026. The final telecast was presented by the winner of Miss World 2016, Stephanie Del Valle, and Mister World 2024, Daniel Mejía.

Joheirry Mola of the Dominican Republic won the competition, succeeding Suchata Chuangsri of Thailand. Her victory marked the second title for her country, following Mariasela Álvarez in 1982. Elisabeth Reynés of Spain and Taanusiya Chetty of Malaysia finished second and third, respectively.

Contestants from 111 countries competed for the title. The competition began on 9 August with fast-track events held in several locations in Vietnam leading up to the finals.

== Overview ==
=== Location and schedule ===
On 25 March 2026, the Miss World Organization announced its selection of Vietnam as the host country for the 73rd Miss World pageant. This was the first time the pageant was held in Vietnam. Hoàng Nhật Nam, director of Miss World Vietnam confirmed the selection soon thereafter. Four days later, during the finals of Miss World Vietnam 2025, the pageant's chairwoman Julia Morley, and incumbent titleholder Suchata Chuangsri announced that the competition will begin on 9 August 2026, with the finals taking place on 5 September.

On 14 May 2026, the competition signed a hosting agreement with locations in Hải Phòng and Vũng Tàu. Nha Trang is scheduled to host the final week of events and the final competition from 29 August to 5 September.

=== Selection of participants ===
Contestants from 111 countries and territories competed in the edition. They were formally introduced on 12 August 2026, during an opening ceremony at the Hạ Long Marina Square in Hạ Long.

==== Replacements ====
Leading up to the opening ceremony, a number of national franchises replaced their delegates: Ashma Kumari of Nepal was replaced by her national successor Luna Luitel; Lauryane Dilo of Guadeloupe was replaced by Annaëlle Ibo; Rongfei Gan of China was also replaced by Yifei Dong; and Marigona Musshabani of Kosovo was replaced by Blair Isufi.

A number of national titleholders also withdrew from this edition and were replaced, including Soriya Khorn of Cambodia, who was replaced by Leakena In; and Carly Wilson of the Northern Ireland, who withdrew from the pageant due to health issues, being replaced by her first runner-up Amelie Moore. Jade Glab of the United States deferred her participation to the next edition and was replaced by her first runner-up, Mary Sickler.

==== Debuts, returns, and withdrawals ====
This contest had the debuts of Eritrea, French Guiana, the Maldives, Mozambique and Pakistan. Returning countries included Malawi which last took part in 2012; Kosovo in 2014; the Cook Islands and Laos in 2019; The Bahamas in 2021; and Guinea-Bissau, Morocco, South Korea and Tanzania in 2023.

Monika Harutjunjan of Armenia, Samantha Quenedit of Ecuador, and Nadiratou Afolabi of Togo withdrew from the competition. Mari-Ann Rõuk of Estonia stepped down to focus on her studies and was replaced by her first runner-up, Henel Vare. However, Vare also withdrew.

Madagascar withdrew from the competition as their national organization failed to select a contestant, organize a national pageant, or retain the franchise. Bhutan was also withdrew following the postponement of Miss Bhutan 2026.

== Results ==
=== Placements ===
Placement	Contestant
Miss World 2026	Dominican Republic – Joheirry Mola
1st Runner-Up	Spain – Elisabeth Reynés
2nd Runner-Up	Malaysia – Taanusiya Chetty
Top 6	Eritrea – Snit Tewoldemedhin (Note: Automatically advanced to the Top 12 and Top 6 as the winner of the People's Choice Award); South Africa – Romanda Hombir; Vietnam – Lê Nguyễn Bảo Ngọc
Top 12	Brazil – Gabriela Botelho; France – Indira Ampiot; Nigeria – Tamunosoye Karibi-George (Note: Automatically advanced to the Top 12 as the runner-up for the People's Choice Award); Philippines – Asia Rose Simpson; Zambia – Adah Mushibi; Zimbabwe – Brunette Makanyiso
Top 20	Argentina – Alina Akselrad; Belgium – Olga Lombardo; China – Yifei Dong; Cook Islands – Tiarē Henry-Anguna; Gibraltar – Julia Horne; Kenya – Trizah Muhenje Akala; Peru – Josiane Sciotti; Senegal – Fatoumata Diop; Ukraine – Valeriia Lisovska; United States – Mary Sickler
Top 40	Belize – Faith Edgar; Cambodia – Leakena In; Canada – Angelina Fan; England – Grace Richardson; French Guiana – Audrey Ho-Wen-Tsaï; Germany – Julia Kühnle; India – Nikita Porwal; Indonesia – Audrey Bianca; Lebanon – Perla Harb; Malawi – Ireen Navicha; Mozambique – Arcenia Quehá; Poland – Maja Todd; Puerto Rico – Suil Pagán; Scotland – Eilidh MacDonald; Tanzania – Latricia Ian Sawe; Trinidad and Tobago – Georgia-Lee Gill; Turkey – Sıla Saraydemir; Wales – Helena Hawke

=== Continental Queens of Beauty ===
Following the announcement of the Dominican Republic as the winner, the top-ranking delegates from each continent and selected regions were conferred the title of continental queen.

Continent/Region	Contestant
Africa	South Africa – Romanda Hombir
Americas	Brazil – Gabriela Botelho
Asia	Malaysia – Taanusiya Chetty
Caribbean	Trinidad and Tobago – Georgia-Lee Gill
Europe	Spain – Elisabeth Reynés
Oceania	Cook Islands – Tiarē Henry-Anguna

=== World Designer Awards ===
Four continental winners of the World Designer Award were named on 27 August, following the Top Model Challenge.

Continent	Contestant
Africa	Mauritius – Shreeya Bokhoree
Americas and Caribbean	Canada – Angelina Fan
Asia and Oceania	China – Yifei Dong
Europe	France – Indira Ampiot

== Pageant ==
=== Format ===
For the competition, the 111 contestants are divided into four continental groups: Africa, Americas and Caribbean, Asia and Oceania, and Europe. Together, the fast-track challenges and selection committee select ten delegates from each group to advance to the Top 40 quarterfinals. Five delegates from each group, including fast-track winners and finalists, then advance to the Top 20. Afterward, they are trimmed down to 12, composed of the top two finalists per continental group and the finalists for Beauty With a Purpose and People's Choice, to face the first question-and-answer round. The Top 6 finalists are composed of the top-performing candidates per continental group and the winners of the latter two events, at which point the winner and her two runners-up are named after a final question-and-answer portion.

=== Board of judges ===
The board of judges evaluated the 111 contestants and selected the semifinalists qualifying for the Top 40 by judges' choice. They included:

- Karolina Bielawska – Miss World 2021 from Poland
- Hà Kiều Anh – Vietnamese actress and Miss Vietnam 1992
- Wilnelia Merced – Miss World 1975 from Puerto Rico
- Julia Morley – English chairwoman and chief executive officer of the Miss World Organization
- Linda Pétursdóttir – Miss World 1988 from Iceland
- Phạm Kim Dung – Vietnamese chairwoman of the Miss World Vietnam organization
- Krystyna Pyszková – Miss World 2023 from the Czech Republic

=== Broadcast ===
The finals show was broadcast live on YouTube. Miss World 2016, Stephanie Del Valle, and Mister World 2024, Daniel Mejía, presented the competition. The show integrated showcases of traditional Vietnamese attire in the program.

== Fast-track events ==
As part of the competition's format, 20 contestants secured placements in the different stages of the competition by winning fast-track challenges that were held leading up to the finals, evaluating the contestants in several categories.

Legend

✔ Candidate secured a placement through fast-track events

=== Beauty With a Purpose ===
On 31 August, the contestants presented their Beauty With a Purpose social service projects. Four continental winners were named, each securing a placement in the Top 40. Among them, two secured a place in the Top 12, with the overall winner securing a place in the Top 6.

Placement	Continent	Contestant
Winner	Asia and Oceania	Malaysia – Taanusiya Chetty ✔
Runner-Up	Africa	Zimbabwe – Brunette Makanyiso ✔
Top 4 (Continental Winners)
Top 4 (Continental Winners)	Americas and Caribbean	Belize – Faith Edgar ✔
Top 4 (Continental Winners)	Europe	Spain – Elisabeth Reynés ✔
Top 24 (Continental Qualifiers)	Africa	Ghana – Rumzia Sule; Kenya – Trizah Muhenje Akala; Malawi – Ireen Navicha; Sierra Leone – Mariyam Konneh; Uganda – Trivia Elle Muhoza
Top 24 (Continental Qualifiers)	Americas and Caribbean	French Guiana – Audrey Ho-Wen-Tsaï; Guatemala – Andrea Ortiz; Haiti – Marie Kemlyne Félix; Paraguay – Ayelén Pérez; Venezuela – Mística Núñez
Top 24 (Continental Qualifiers)	Asia and Oceania	Bangladesh – Samanzar Sayeed; Nepal – Luna Luitel; Philippines – Asia Rose Simpson; Sri Lanka – Prathibha Liyanarachchi; Vietnam – Lê Nguyễn Bảo Ngọc
Top 24 (Continental Qualifiers)	Europe	Croatia – Ema Helena Vičar; Denmark – Josephine Bøttger; France – Indira Ampiot; Portugal – Vitória Babinetchi; Ukraine – Valeriia Lisovska

=== Head-to-Head Challenge ===
On 22 and 24 August, the Head to Head Challenge was held at the Khanh Hoa Children's Palace in Nha Trang, where all contestants introduced themselves and their projects. Five shortlisted contestants from each continental group competed in the second round, from which the four continental winners were determined, each automatically advancing to the Top 40. The four continental winners then competed in the final round, from which the overall challenge winner is determined, securing them a place in the Top 20.

Placement	Continent	Contestant
Winner	Asia and Oceania	Philippines – Asia Rose Simpson ✔
Top 4 (Continental Winners)	Africa	South Africa – Romanda Hombir ✔
Top 4 (Continental Winners)	Americas and Caribbean	Trinidad and Tobago – Georgia-Lee Gill ✔
Top 4 (Continental Winners)	Europe	Germany – Julia Kühnle ✔
Top 20 (Continental Qualifiers)	Africa	Eritrea – Snit Tewoldemedhin; Kenya – Trizah Muhenje Akala; Nigeria – Tamunosoye Karibi-George; Zambia – Adah Mushibi
Top 20 (Continental Qualifiers)	Americas and Caribbean	Bahamas – Marechan Burrows; Bolivia – Vanessa Kraljevic; Martinique – Laurence Fibleuil; United States – Mary Sickler
Top 20 (Continental Qualifiers)	Asia and Oceania	Cook Islands – Tiarē Henry-Anguna; Maldives – Mariyam Eema Mohamed; South Korea – Min-seo Cha; Vietnam – Lê Nguyễn Bảo Ngọc
Top 20 (Continental Qualifiers)	Europe	Gibraltar – Julia Horne; Scotland – Eilidh MacDonald; Spain – Elisabeth Reynés; Wales – Helena Hawke

=== Multimedia Challenge ===
The Multimedia Challenge was held through the Miss World app, where the contestants documented their stint in the competition. The top 20 finalists were announced on 1 September through the pageant's social media accounts. The four continental winners secured a place in the Top 40, with the overall winner securing a place in the Top 20.

Placement	Continent	Contestant
Winner	Africa	Zambia – Adah Mushibi ✔
Top 4 (Continental Winners)
Top 4 (Continental Winners)	Americas and Caribbean	French Guiana – Audrey Ho-Wen-Tsaï ✔
Top 4 (Continental Winners)	Asia and Oceania	Indonesia – Audrey Bianca ✔
Top 4 (Continental Winners)	Europe	Germany – Julia Kühnle ✔
Top 20 (Continental Qualifiers)	Africa	Kenya – Trizah Muhenje Akala; Namibia – Elly Aron; Tanzania – Latricia Ian Sawe; Uganda – Trivia Elle Muhoza
Top 20 (Continental Qualifiers)	Americas and Caribbean	Argentina – Alina Akselrad; Chile – Ignacia Fernández; Colombia – Andrea Romero; Dominican Republic – Joheirry Mola
Top 20 (Continental Qualifiers)	Asia and Oceania	Laos – Mongkoutphet Harnsana; Malaysia – Taanusiya Chetty; New Zealand – Chloe Robinson; Thailand – Kanteera Techaphattanakul
Top 20 (Continental Qualifiers)	Europe	Belgium – Olga Lombardo; Gibraltar – Julia Horne; Scotland – Eilidh MacDonald; Spain – Elisabeth Reynés

=== People's Choice Award ===
The public voted for the People's Choice Award through the voting platform Eventista. In the first round, four continental winners secured a place in the Top 40. Voting continues worldwide in the second round to determine the two contestants advancing to the Top 12 and the winner among them advancing to the Top 6.

==== Worldwide round ====
Placement	Contestant
Winner	Eritrea – Snit Tewoldemedhin ✔
Runner-Up	Nigeria – Tamunosoye Karibi-George ✔

==== Continental round ====
Continent	Contestant
Africa	Eritrea – Snit Tewoldemedhin ✔
Americas and Caribbean	Canada – Angelina Fan ✔
Asia and Oceania	Cambodia – Leakena In ✔
Europe	Gibraltar – Julia Horne ✔

=== Sports Challenge ===
The Sports Challenge was held at the Dream Dragon Resort in Hải Phòng on 19 August 2026. The winner automatically advanced to the Top 40.

Placement	Contestant
Winner	Puerto Rico – Suil Pagán ✔
2nd place	Northern Ireland – Amelie Moore
3rd place	Australia – Olivija Spanovskis
Top 24	Albania – Alba Tirtja; Belgium – Olga Lombardo; Botswana – Ruth Thomas; Curaçao – Lishantely Jennie; El Salvador – Adriana Rivas; England – Grace Richardson; Equatorial Guinea – María de los Ángeles Ndong; Finland – Kiia Huutoniemi; Germany – Julia Kühnle; Ireland – Caoimhe Kenny; Kenya – Trizah Muhenje Akala; Mexico – Cassandra García; Netherlands – Charlotte Boonstra; North Macedonia – Eva Velichkovska; Panama – Madeline Miller; Paraguay – Ayelén Pérez; Philippines – Asia Rose Simpson; Portugal – Vitória Babinetchi; Slovenia – Amadea Zupan; Spain – Elisabeth Reynés; Sri Lanka – Prathibha Liyanarachchi

=== Talent Challenge ===
In the Talent Challenge, continental qualifier contestants will showcase their skills in music, dance, and art. The winner of the segment advanced to the Top 40.

Placement	Contestant
Winner	England – Grace Richardson ✔
2nd place	Guadeloupe – Annaëlle Ibo
3rd place	Philippines – Asia Rose Simpson
Top 23	Bosnia and Herzegovina – Lana Jahić; Chile – Ignacia Fernández; China – Yifei Dong; Colombia – Andrea Romero; Cook Islands – Tiarē Henry-Anguna; Denmark – Josephine Bøttger; Eritrea – Snit Tewoldemedhin; Ethiopia – Ruth Yirgalem; Gibraltar – Julia Horne; Guatemala – Andrea Ortiz; Ireland – Caoimhe Kenny; Nepal – Luna Luitel; Nigeria – Tamunosoye Karibi-George; Northern Ireland – Amelie Moore; Paraguay – Ayelén Pérez; Poland – Maja Todd; Portugal – Vitória Babinetchi; Sri Lanka – Prathibha Liyanarachchi; Vietnam – Lê Nguyễn Bảo Ngọc; Zambia – Adah Mushibi

=== Top Model Challenge ===
On 18 August, the first round of the Top Model Challenge was held in conjunction with the 17th season of Vietnam Beauty Fashion Fest at the Dragon Beach Square in Hải Phòng, where sixty finalists were selected for the second round. The second round, held on 27 August in Nha Trang, featured designs by local brands. From the initial finalists, four continental winners were named, each automatically advancing to the Top 40. In the live final, the overall winner from this challenge advanced into the Top 20.

Placement	Continent	Contestant
Winner	Europe	France – Indira Ampiot ✔
Top 4 (Continental Winners)	Africa	Nigeria – Tamunosoye Karibi-George ✔
Top 4 (Continental Winners)	Americas and Caribbean	Dominican Republic – Joheirry Mola ✔
Top 4 (Continental Winners)	Asia and Oceania	Vietnam – Lê Nguyễn Bảo Ngọc ✔
Top 21 (Continental Finalists)	Africa	Botswana – Ruth Thomas; Equatorial Guinea – María de los Ángeles Ndong; Kenya – Trizah Muhenje Akala; South Africa – Romanda Hombir; Zimbabwe – Brunette Makanyiso
Top 21 (Continental Finalists)	Americas and Caribbean	Colombia – Andrea Romero; French Guiana – Audrey Ho-Wen-Tsaï; United States – Mary Sickler; Venezuela – Mística Núñez
Top 21 (Continental Finalists)	Asia and Oceania	Cambodia – Leakena In; China – Yifei Dong; India – Nikita Porwal; Thailand – Kanteera Techaphattanakul
Top 21 (Continental Finalists)	Europe	Belgium – Olga Lombardo; Czech Republic – Linda Górecká; Kosovo – Blair Isufi; Ukraine – Valeriia Lisovska
Top 60 (Continental Qualifiers)	Africa	Cameroon – Noura Njikam; Côte d'Ivoire – Fatima Koné; Ghana – Rumzia Sule; Guinea – Saran Keita; Mauritius – Shreeya Bokhoree; Mozambique – Arcénia Quehá; Senegal – Fatoumata Diop; Somalia – Foziya Abdullahi Garad; Tanzania – Latricia Ian Sawe
Top 60 (Continental Qualifiers)	Americas and Caribbean	Argentina – Alina Akselrad; Bahamas – Marechan Burrows; Bolivia – Vanessa Kraljevic; Brazil – Gabriela Botelho; Canada – Angelina Fan; Cayman Islands – Kristianna Gordon; Chile – Ignacia Fernández; Curaçao – Lishantely Jennie; Martinique – Laurence Fibleuil; Panama – Madeline Miller; Peru – Josiane Sciotti; Trinidad and Tobago – Georgia-Lee Gill
Top 60 (Continental Qualifiers)	Asia and Oceania	Australia – Olivija Spanovskis; Indonesia – Audrey Bianca Callista; Japan – Yui Kawana; Laos – Mongkoutphet Harnsana; Malaysia – Taanusiya Chetty; Myanmar – Han Theint Theint Aung; Philippines – Asia Rose Simpson; Sri Lanka – Prathibha Liyanarachchi; Turkey – Sıla Saraydemir
Top 60 (Continental Qualifiers)	Europe	Denmark – Josephine Bøttger; Gibraltar – Julia Horne; Italy – Lucrezia Mangilli; Malta – Nicole Spiteri; Montenegro – Maša Vukićević; Netherlands – Charlotte Boonstra; Poland – Maja Todd; Portugal – Vitória Babinetchi; Spain – Elisabeth Reynés

== Contestants ==
A total of 111 delegates competed for the title.

Country/Territory	Contestant	Age (Note: Ages at the time of the pageant)	Hometown	Continental Group	Ref.
Albania	Alba Tirtja	25	Tirana	Europe	
Argentina	Alina Akselrad	27	Córdoba	Americas and Caribbean	
Australia	Olivija Spanovskis	25	Adelaide	Asia and Oceania	
Bahamas	Marechan Burrows	27	Nassau	Americas and Caribbean	
Bangladesh	Samanzar Sayeed	24	Dhaka	Asia and Oceania	
Belgium	Olga Lombardo	22	Leuven	Europe	
Belize	Faith Edgar	24	San Pedro	Americas and Caribbean	
Bolivia	Vanessa Kraljevic	23	Cochabamba	Americas and Caribbean	
Bosnia and Herzegovina	Lana Jahić	18	Tuzla	Europe	
Botswana	Ruth Thomas	24	Masunga	Africa	
Brazil	Gabriela Botelho	25	Belo Horizonte	Americas and Caribbean	
Bulgaria	Tsevetelina Lozanova	26	Sofia	Europe	
Cambodia	Leakena In	24	Phnom Penh	Asia and Oceania	
Cameroon	Noura Njikam	26	Yaoundé	Africa	
Canada	Angelina Fan	24	Toronto	Americas and Caribbean	
Cayman Islands	Kristianna Gordon	21	West Bay	Americas and Caribbean	
Chile	Ignacia Fernández	27	Las Condes	Americas and Caribbean	
China	Yifei Dong	26	Qiqihar	Asia and Oceania	
Colombia	Andrea Romero	19	Barranquilla	Americas and Caribbean	
Cook Islands	Tiarē Henry-Anguna	23	Titikaveka	Asia and Oceania	
Côte d'Ivoire	Fatima Koné	23	Bouaké	Africa	
Croatia	Ema Helena Vičar	23	Zagreb	Europe	
Curaçao	Lishantely Jennie	18	Willemstad	Americas and Caribbean	
Czech Republic	Linda Górecká	22	Prague	Europe	
Denmark	Josephine Bøttger	24	Hillerød	Europe	
Dominican Republic	Joheirry Mola	24	Santo Domingo	Americas and Caribbean	
El Salvador	Adriana Rivas	23	Usulután	Americas and Caribbean	
England	Grace Richardson	19	Leicester	Europe	
Equatorial Guinea	María de los Ángeles Ndong	25	Malabo	Africa	
Eritrea	Snit Tewoldemedhin	26	Asmara	Africa	
Ethiopia	Ruth Yirgalem	21	Addis Ababa	Africa	
Finland	Kiia Huutoniemi	21	Jyväskylä	Europe	
France	Indira Ampiot	21	Basse-Terre	Europe	
French Guiana	Audrey Ho-Wen-Tsaï	20	Kourou	Americas and Caribbean	
Germany	Julia Kühnle	26	Berlin	Europe	
Ghana	Rumzia Sule	22	North East	Africa	
Gibraltar	Julia Horne	26	Gibraltar	Europe	
Greece	Mikaela Kasari	19	Athens	Europe	
Guadeloupe	Annaëlle Ibo	24	Metz	Americas and Caribbean	
Guatemala	Andrea Ortiz	20	Chiquimula	Americas and Caribbean	
Guinea	Saran Keita	26	Kankan	Africa	
Guinea-Bissau	Hernânia Nantote	26	–	Africa	
Guyana	Kelcia Nelson	27	Linden	Americas and Caribbean	
Haiti	Marie Kemlyne Félix	25	Jérémie	Americas and Caribbean	
Hungary	Janka Végvári	18	Mosonmagyaróvár	Europe	
India	Nikita Porwal	24	Ujjain	Asia and Oceania	
Indonesia	Audrey Bianca	23	Tangerang	Asia and Oceania	
Ireland	Caoimhe Kenny	25	Dublin	Europe	
Italy	Lucrezia Mangilli	26	Udine	Europe	
Jamaica	Nevaeh Allen	19	Linstead	Americas and Caribbean	
Japan	Yui Kawana	24	Tokyo	Asia and Oceania	
Kazakhstan	Bagym Baltabaeva	23	Oskemen	Asia and Oceania	
Kenya	Trizah Muhenje Akala	24	Nairobi	Africa	
Kosovo	Blair Isufi	27	West Hartford	Europe	
Kyrgyzstan	Saadat Asylbekova	26	Bishkek	Asia and Oceania	
Laos	Mongkoutphet Harnsana	24	Salavan	Asia and Oceania	
Latvia	Milana Smolara	27	Riga	Europe	
Lebanon	Perla Harb	22	Al-Maamriyah	Asia and Oceania	
Malawi	Ireen Navicha	22	Lilongwe	Africa	
Malaysia	Taanusiya Chetty	24	Kuala Lumpur	Asia and Oceania	
Maldives	Mariyam Eema Mohamed	23	–	Asia and Oceania	
Malta	Nicole Spiteri	23	Marsa	Europe	
Martinique	Laurence Fibleuil	24	Le Robert	Americas and Caribbean	
Mauritius	Shreeya Bokhoree	23	Grand Port	Africa	
Mexico	Cassandra García	23	Emiliano Zapata	Americas and Caribbean	
Mongolia	Enkhtuul Bayarsaikhan	26	Ulaanbaatar	Asia and Oceania	
Montenegro	Maša Vukićević	21	Cetinje	Europe	
Morocco	Chirihan Chergui	20	Berkane	Africa	
Mozambique	Arcénia Quehá	–	Sofala	Africa	
Myanmar	Han Theint Theint Aung	20	Taungoo	Asia and Oceania	
Namibia	Elly Aron	20	Ohangwena	Africa	
Nepal	Luna Luitel	27	Kathmandu	Asia and Oceania	
Netherlands	Charlotte Boonstra	26	The Hague	Europe	
New Zealand	Chloe Robinson	19	Auckland	Asia and Oceania	
Nicaragua	Belén Cáceres	26	Matagalpa	Americas and Caribbean	
Nigeria	Tamunosoye Karibi-George	26	Port Harcourt	Africa	
North Macedonia	Eva Velichkovska	20	Skopje	Europe	
Northern Ireland	Amelie Moore	18	Ballyclare	Europe	
Pakistan	Anniqa Jamal Iqbal	24	Lahore	Asia and Oceania	
Panama	Madeline Miller	23	Panama City	Americas and Caribbean	
Paraguay	Ayelén Pérez	27	Asunción	Americas and Caribbean	
Peru	Josiane Sciotti	20	Lima	Americas and Caribbean	
Philippines	Asia Rose Simpson	18	Quezon City	Asia and Oceania	
Poland	Maja Todd	21	Katowice	Europe	
Portugal	Vitória Babinetchi	22	Guimarães	Europe	
Puerto Rico	Suil Pagán	21	San Juan	Americas and Caribbean	
Scotland	Eilidh MacDonald	27	Glasgow	Europe	
Senegal	Fatoumata Diop	26	Dakar	Africa	
Serbia	Simona Manojlović	21	Novi Sad	Europe	
Sierra Leone	Mariyam Konneh	21	Pujehun	Africa	
Singapore	Aishwarya Tan	22	Singapore	Asia and Oceania	
Slovenia	Amadea Zupan	26	Sežana	Europe	
Somalia	Foziya Abdullahi Garad	21	Mogadishu	Africa	
South Africa	Romanda Hombir	27	Mbombela	Africa	
South Korea	Min-seo Cha	20	Seoul	Asia and Oceania	
South Sudan	Nyandeng Kerubino Bol	–	Juba	Africa	
Spain	Elisabeth Reynés	22	Mallorca	Europe	
Sri Lanka	Prathibha Liyanarachchi	27	Colombo	Asia and Oceania	
Sweden	Bianca Lindström	22	Stockholm	Europe	
Tanzania	Latricia Ian Sawe	24	Dar es Salaam	Africa	
Thailand	Kanteera Techaphattanakul	25	Mae Yao	Asia and Oceania	
Trinidad and Tobago	Georgia-Lee Gill	24	Arima	Americas and Caribbean	
Turkey	Sıla Saraydemir	22	Istanbul	Asia and Oceania	
Uganda	Elle Muhoza	22	Bukomansimbi	Africa	
Ukraine	Valeriia Lisovska	18	Odesa	Europe	
United States	Mary Sickler	23	Houston	Americas and Caribbean	
Venezuela	Mística Núñez	24	Punto Fijo	Americas and Caribbean	
Vietnam	Lê Nguyễn Bảo Ngọc	25	Cần Thơ	Asia and Oceania	
Wales	Helena Hawke	20	Caerleon	Europe	
Zambia	Adah Mushibi	26	Lusaka	Africa	
Zimbabwe	Brunette Makanyiso	26	Chitungwiza	Africa	
