= Hasset Dereje =

Ethiopian beauty pageant titleholder

- Hasseet Dereje
- Born: Addis Ababa, Ethiopia
- Education: Addis Ababa Science and Technology University
- Beauty pageant titleholder
- Title: Miss World Ethiopia 2024; Miss World Africa 2025
- Major competitions: Miss International Ethiopia 2024 (1st Runner-Up); Miss World Ethiopia 2024 (Winner); Miss World 2025 (1st Runner-Up) (Miss World Africa)

Hasset Dereje Admassu (Oromo : Hasseet Dereje Admaassu ) is an Ethiopian beauty pageant titleholder who was crowned Miss World Ethiopia 2024. She represented Ethiopia at the Miss World 2025 pageant, held in Hyderabad, India, where she finished as the first runner-up and was awarded the continental title of Miss World Africa 2025.

== Early life and education ==
Hasset Dereje was born in Addis Ababa, Ethiopia. She studied chemical engineering at Addis Ababa Science and Technology University. She has described her academic achievements as among her proudest accomplishments.

== Pageantry ==
=== Initial stints ===
Prior to competing at Miss World Ethiopia, Hasset competed in the Miss Teen International 2024 pageant and the Miss International Ethiopia 2024 pageant, where she finished as the first runner-up.

=== Miss World Ethiopia ===
On 12 January 2024, Hasset competed in the Miss World Ethiopia 2024 pageant, held at the Bonanza Hotel in Addis Ababa. She won the title at the conclusion of the event, earning the right to represent Ethiopia at the Miss World 2025 pageant.

=== Miss World ===
As Miss World Ethiopia 2024, Hasset represented Ethiopia at the Miss World 2025 pageant, held at the HITEX Exhibition Centre in Hyderabad, Telangana, India, on 31 May 2025. At the conclusion of the competition, she was announced as the first runner-up, finishing behind Suchata Chuangsri of Thailand, who was crowned Miss World 2025.

Hasset's first runner-up finish marked the highest placement ever achieved by an Ethiopian representative at the Miss World pageant. It also made her the second Ethiopian woman to attain a runner-up finish at a major international beauty pageant, following Hiwot Bekele Mamo, who was named first runner-up at Miss Grand International 2014. As the highest-placing contestant from Africa, Hasset was also awarded the continental title of Miss World Africa 2025.

During the fast-track events held prior to the final competition, Hasset placed among the Top 32 in the Sports Challenge and the Top 24 in the Talent Challenge.

== Advocacy ==
Hasset serves as an ambassador for the Maya Charitable Organization, where she works to raise awareness of spina bifida and hydrocephalus. She is also an advocate for women's health and education, promoting initiatives that empower women and drive positive change in Ethiopia and beyond.

Awards and achievements
| Preceded by (Botswana) Lesego Chombo | Miss World Africa; 2025 | Succeeded by (South Africa) Romanda Hombir |
| Preceded by (Lebanon) Yasmina Zaytoun | 1st Runner-Up Miss World; 2025 | Succeeded by (Spain) Elisabeth Reynés |
| Preceded by Rgat Afewerki Ybrah | Miss World Ethiopia; 2024 | Succeeded by Ruth Yirgalem |
