= Elisabeth Reynés =

Spanish beauty pageant titleholder and model

- Born: Elisabeth Reynés Alabern; 2003 or 2004 (age 22–23); Palma de Mallorca, Balearic Islands, Spain
- Education: University of the Balearic Islands
- Occupations: Hotel management student; model
- Height: 1.71 m (5 ft 7 1/2 in)
- Beauty pageant titleholder
- Title: Miss World Illes Balears 2025; Miss World Spain 2026; Miss World Europe 2026
- Major competitions: Miss World Spain 2026; (Winner); Miss World 2026; (1st Runner-Up); (Miss World Europe)

Elisabeth Reynés Alabern (born c. 2003/2004) is a Spanish beauty pageant titleholder, model, and hotel management student who was crowned Miss World Spain 2026. She represented Spain at Miss World 2026 in Vietnam, where she finished as the 1st Runner-Up, achieving the country's highest placement in the competition since 2015.

== Early life and education ==
Reynés was born in Palma de Mallorca, Balearic Islands. She completed her secondary education at the Ágora Portals international school. She earned a degree in Accommodation Management (Gestión de Alojamientos) and pursued further studies in Hotel Management at the University of the Balearic Islands (UIB).

Reynés great-grandfather was Carl Gustaf von Rosen, a Swedish aviator known for leading humanitarian supply missions during the Biafran War.

== Pageantry ==
=== Miss World Spain 2026 ===
Reynés began competing in regional pageants after winning Miss World Illes Balears 2025. On 18 April 2026, she represented the Balearic Islands at the Miss World Spain 2026 national final held at the Sala Garbo's in San Bartolomé de Tirajana, Gran Canaria. At the conclusion of the event, she was crowned Miss World Spain 2026, succeeding Corina Mrazek.

=== Miss World 2026 ===
As Miss World Spain, Reynés qualified to represent Spain at the 75th Anniversary Edition of the Miss World 2026 pageant, held from August to September 2026 in Nha Trang, Vietnam. During the preliminary events, she competed in the Top Model challenge wearing a design inspired by a traditional Goyesque cape. On 5 September 2026, Reynés reached the final stage and was named the 1st Runner-Up behind winner Joheirry Mola of the Dominican Republic. Her placement marked the second-highest result for Spain in Miss World history.

Awards and achievements
Preceded by (Ethiopia) Hasset Dereje	1st Runner-Up Miss World; 2026	Incumbent
Preceded by (Poland) Maja Klajda	Miss World Europe; 2026	Incumbent
Preceded by Corina Mrazek	Miss World Spain; 2026	Incumbent
