= Miss World Nigeria =

Beauty pageant

- Formation: 2024; 2 years ago
- Headquarters: Lagos
- Location: Nigeria
- Members: Miss World
- Official language: English
- Pageant organiser: Silverbird Group
- Website: Official Website

The Miss World Nigeria is a beauty pageant organized by the Silverbird Group with the main purpose of sending representatives to the Miss World contest. It was created after the discontinuation of the Most Beautiful Girl in Nigeria pageant, which was also organized by the Silverbird Group. According to the organizers, changes in the requirements for the Miss Universe participants drove the need to create a separate platform to determine Nigerian representatives for both competitions. The first winner was Joy Raimi, who represented Osun State.
