= Taanusiya Chetty =

Malaysian model and beauty queen

- Taanusiya in 2026
- Born: Taanusiya Chetty Veerapandian; September 8, 2000 (age 26); Cheras, Kuala Lumpur, Malaysia
- Education: UCSI College (DipEd); Management & Science University (BEd)
- Occupations: model; beauty pageant titleholder
- Height: 1.73 m (5 ft 8 in)
- Beauty pageant titleholder
- Title: Miss Grand Kuala Lumpur 2018; Miss Global Malaysia 2023; Miss World Malaysia 2024
- Major competitions: Miss Grand Malaysia 2018; (3rd Runner-Up); Miss Global 2023; (Top 13); Miss World Malaysia 2024; (Winner); Miss World 2026; (2nd Runner-Up) (Miss World Asia) (Beauty with a Purpose Winner)

Taanusiya Chetty Veerapandian (Tamil: டானுசியா செட்டி; born 8 September 2000) is a Malaysian model and beauty pageant titleholder who won Miss World Malaysia 2024. She is the second Malaysian to placed third after Lina Teoh in 1998.

Taanusiya went on to represent Malaysia at Miss World 2026, making history by finishing as second runner-up the country’s highest achievement at the competition since Lina Teoh’s historic placement in 1998. Her success was further crowned by winning the Beauty with a Purpose award, making her the second Malaysian to win a Miss World subsidiary title after Dewi Liana Seriestha, who captured Miss World Talent in 2014.

== Early life and education ==
Taanusiya was born in Cheras, a suburb of Kuala Lumpur, Malaysia. Affectionately known as Taanu, she is fluent in Malay, English, Mandarin and Tamil. She is currently pursuing Bachelor of Education majoring in Teaching English as a Second Language (TESL) at Management & Science University.

== Pageantry ==
=== Miss Global Malaysia 2023 ===
Taanusiya was appointed Miss Global Malaysia 2023, under the Ratu Wanita Malaya organization, and represented Malaysia at Miss Global 2023 in Cambodia, where she reached the top 13.

=== Miss World Malaysia 2024 ===
In December 2024, she competed at the Miss World Malaysia 2024 pageant held in Kota Kinabalu, Sabah, where she was crowned Miss World Malaysia 2024.

=== Miss World 2026 ===
Taanusiya represented Malaysia at Miss World 2026 in Nha Trang, Vietnam where she made history by finishing as the second runner-up, as well as receiving the continental award of Miss World Asia and winner of Beauty with a Purpose with her humanitarian project titled Be The Change Malaysia.

== Humanitarian works ==
In 2022, Taanusiya founded Be The Change Malaysia, later formally registered as Pertubuhan Suara Perubahan Insan Murni in 2025 under the Registrar of Societies (ROS). Through the initiative, she has worked on projects involving children and young people.

== Awards ==
- The BrandLaureate Awards 2026 - Beauty Queen with A Purpose: Leadership in Compassionate Education & Humanitarian Impact
- Nona Rising 40 Under 40 2026

Awards and achievements
Preceded by Maja Klajda	Miss World 2nd Runner-Up; 2026	Succeeded by Incumbent
Preceded by Krishnah Gravidez	Miss World Asia; 2026	Succeeded by Incumbent
Preceded by Saroop Roshi	Miss World Malaysia; 2024	Succeeded by Incumbent
