= Joheirry Mola =

Dominican beauty pageant titleholder, and Miss World 2026

- Mola in 2026
- Born: Joheirry Mola Dominguez; September 27, 2001 (age 25); Passaic, New Jersey, U.S.
- Education: Universidad Iberoamericana
- Occupations: Model; teacher; journalist
- Height: 1.75 m (5 ft 9 in)
- Beauty pageant titleholder
- Title: Miss Mundo Dominicana 2025; Miss World 2026
- Major competitions: Miss Mundo Dominicana 2025; (Winner); Miss World 2026; (Winner)

Joheirry Mola Dominguez (Latin American Spanish pronunciation: [xoˈei̯ri ˈmola doˈmiŋɡes]; born September 27, 2001) is a Dominican model, teacher, journalist, and beauty pageant titleholder who won Miss World 2026. She is the second Dominican woman to win Miss World, following Mariasela Álvarez in 1982.

== Early life and education ==
Joheirry Mola Dominguez was born on September 27, 2001, in Passaic, New Jersey to Dominican parents. Her mother, Heiddy Dominguez, is from La Vega, while her father, Jovanny Alejandro Mola Reyes, is from the Distrito Nacional. At six years old, she relocated with her family to Santo Domingo, Dominican Republic, where she was raised.

She attended Universidad Iberoamericana (UNIBE), graduating with a degree in Business Management and Administration (Dirección y Gestión Empresarial).

== Career ==
Mola works as a teacher in Literature and Social Studies in English. She is also the founder and president of Voices of Tomorrow, a social initiative and Beauty with a Purpose project focused on expanding English-language education for children and young people in vulnerable communities.

In media and television broadcasting, Mola works as a correspondent for Univision New York's segment Ventana a Quisqueya, covering Dominican culture, social issues, and community stories. She delivers live pre-show reporting for Univision at the Premios Soberano, and served as a reporting correspondent during the UNICEF Together For Children Telethon. Additionally, Mola works as a professional model and serves as a Goya Gives Ambassador.

== Pageantry ==
At her first pageant, Mola represented the Dominican Republic and was the second runner-up at Miss Teen Américas 2018. In 2025, she represented the Distrito Nacional at Miss Mundo Dominicana 2025 (Miss World Dominican Republic 2025), where she won the national title, succeeding Mayra Delgado.

Mola represented the Dominican Republic and won Miss World 2026, held in Nha Trang, Vietnam, on September 5, 2026. She also won the Americas and Caribbean continental title in the Top Model competition. During the final question-and-answer round, Mola was asked by Miss World Vietnam chairwoman Phạm Kim Dung, “Which beauty with a purpose cause have you supported in your country, and how would you improve it if you were crowned Miss World?” Mola responded:

My beauty with a purpose is to take English program to kids in vulnerable communities, because I believe that when they know this language, the opportunities that the, the doors that can open to their life, it's a huge, big doors.

She also stated that her initiative provides vulnerable children with English as a valuable tool for self-expression and communication throughout their lives. She was crowned by the outgoing titleholder, Suchata Chuangsri of Thailand. Following her victory, Mola received congratulations from Dominican President Luis Abinader and several public officials.

Awards and achievements
Preceded by Suchata Chuangsri, Thailand	Miss World; 2026	Succeeded by Incumbent
Preceded by Aurélie Joachim, Martinique	Top Model Winner (Americas and Caribbean); 2026	Succeeded by Incumbent
Preceded by Mayra Delgado (Distrito Nacional)	Miss Mundo Dominicana; 2025	Succeeded by Incumbent
