= Miss Universe Guyana =

Beauty pageant

Miss Universe Guyana Organization
- Formation: 1947
- Type: Beauty pageant
- Headquarters: Georgetown
- Location: Guyana
- Members: Miss Universe
- Official language: English
- President: Teri Brown Walker

The Miss Universe Guyana (previously called Miss Guyana) is a national beauty pageant in Guyana which selects the country's representatives into the Miss Universe pageant.

== History ==
Guyana debuted in 1956 as the British Guiana until 1966 under the Miss British Guiana pageant. The very first Miss Universe British Guiana in that epoch, was Rosalind Iva Joan Fung from Georgetown. The British Guiana beauty pageant existed from 1947 when Phyllis Woolford won the first Miss British Guiana pageant. In 1999, the Guyana sash used on the Miss Universe stage for the first time. In 2016 the pageant was renamed from Miss Guyana (from previous directorship) to Miss Universe Guyana under Moonlight Productions. In 2023, the Miss Universe Guyana license was granted to Mrs. Brown Walker, an American director.

=== Editions ===
On September 12, 2012, for the first time in history, Leila Lopes, Miss Universe 2011 of Angola attended the final of Miss Guyana 2012 while Ruqayyah Boyer declared as the new titleholder of Guyana.

On October 8, 2013, Katherina Roshana crowned Miss Guyana 2013. For the first time, the reigning titleholder of Miss Guyana was crowned Miss India Guyana 2013.

=== Directorships ===
- Queen of the Beauties of the Guianas (1956)
- Miss Guyana Association (1999)
- Odinga Lumumba (2002)
- Moonlight Productions, Jyoti Hardat (2016)
- Teri Brown Walker (2023-2025)

== Titleholder ==
Year	Miss Guyana	Region
1947	Phyllis Woolford	Demerara-Mahaica
1956	Rosalind Iva Joan Fung	Demerara-Mahaica
1958	Clyo Fernandes	Demerara-Mahaica
1960	Julia Ann Adamson	Demerara-Mahaica
1961	Hermione Clair Brown	Demerara-Mahaica
1962	Ave Henriques	Demerara-Mahaica
1963	Gloria Blackman	Demerara-Mahaica
1964	Mary Rande Holl	Demerara-Mahaica
1965	Cheryl Viola Cheeng	Demerara-Mahaica
1966	Umblita Claire Van Sluytman	Demerara-Mahaica
1967	Shakira Caine	Demerara-Mahaica
1968	Adrienne Harris	Demerara-Mahaica
1969	Pamela Patricia Lord	Demerara-Mahaica
1970	Jennifer Diana Wong	Demerara-Mahaica
1971	Nalini Moonsar	Demerara-Mahaica
1988	Christina Jardim	Demerara-Mahaica
1989	Reeya Majeed	Demerara-Mahaica
1999	Morvinia Sobers	Demerara-Mahaica
2002	Mia Rahaman	Demerara-Mahaica
2003	Leanna Yulanie Damond	East Berbice-Corentyne
2004	Odessa Abenaa Phillips	Essequibo Islands-West Demerara
2005	Candisie Franklin	Upper Demerara-Berbice
2006	Alana Ernest	Potaro-Siparuni
2007	Meleesa Natasha Payne	Demerara-Mahaica
2009	Jenel Cox	Demerara-Mahaica
2010	Tamika Henry	Demerara-Mahaica
2011	Kara Lord	Demerara-Mahaica
2012	Ruqayyah Boyer	Demerara-Mahaica
2013	Katherina Roshana	Demerara-Mahaica
2014	Niketa Barker	Demerara-Mahaica
2015	Shauna Ramdehan	Demerara-Mahaica
2016	Soyini Fraser	Demerara-Mahaica
2017	Rafieya Husain	Demerara-Mahaica
2023	Lisa Narine	Pomeroon-Supenaam
2024	Ariana Blaize	Demerara-Mahaica
2025	Chandini Baljor	Demerara-Mahaica

== Titleholder under Miss Universe Guyana org. ==
=== Miss Guyana Universe ===
- : Declared as Winner
- : Ended as runner-up or top 5/6 qualification
- : Ended as one of the finalists or semifinalists
- : Ended as special awards winner

On occasion, when the winner does not qualify (due to age) for either contest, a runner-up is sent.

Year	Region	Miss Guyana	Placement at Miss Universe	Special Award(s)	Notes
2026	Toronto, Ontario	Angel Bhathal	TBA		
2025	Demerara-Mahaica	Chandini Baljor	Unplaced		
2024	Demerara-Mahaica	Ariana Blaize	Unplaced		
2023	Pomeroon-Supenaam	Lisa Narine	Unplaced		Teri Brown Walker directorship.
Did not compete between 2018—2022
2017	Demerara-Mahaica	Rafieya Husain	Unplaced		
2016	Demerara-Mahaica	Soyini Fraser	Unplaced		Miss Universe Guyana Organization — Jyoti Hardat (Moonlight Production) directorship.
2015	Demerara-Mahaica	Shauna Ramdehan	Unplaced		
2014	Demerara-Mahaica	Niketa Barker	Unplaced		
2013	Demerara-Mahaica	Katherina Roshana	Unplaced		
2012	Demerara-Mahaica	Ruqayyah Boyer	Unplaced		
2011	Demerara-Mahaica	Kara Lord	Unplaced		
2010	Demerara-Mahaica	Tamika Henry	Unplaced		
2009	Demerara-Mahaica	Jenel Cox	Unplaced		
2008	Did not compete				
2007	Demerara-Mahaica	Meleesa Natasha Payne	Unplaced		
2006	Potaro-Siparuni	Alana Ernest	Unplaced		
2005	Upper Demerara-Berbice	Candisie Franklin	Unplaced		
2004	Essequibo Islands-West Demerara	Odessa Abenaa Phillips	Unplaced		
2003	East Berbice-Corentyne	Leanna Yulanie Damond	Unplaced		
2002	Demerara-Mahaica	Mia Rahaman	Unplaced		Odinga Lumumba directorship.
Did not compete between 2000—2001
1999	Demerara-Mahaica	Morvinia Sobers	Unplaced		Miss Guyana Association directorship ― The first time by using Guyana sash on the Miss Universe stage.
Did not compete between 1967—1998
1966	Demerara-Mahaica	Umblita Claire Van Sluytman	Unplaced		The last Miss British Guiana at Miss Universe pageant.
1965	Demerara-Mahaica	Cheryl Viola Cheeng	Unplaced		
1964	Demerara-Mahaica	Mary Rande Holl	Unplaced		
1963	Demerara-Mahaica	Gloria Blackman	Unplaced		
Did not compete between 1959—1962
1958	Demerara-Mahaica	Clyo Fernandez	Unplaced		
1957	Did not compete				
1956	Demerara-Mahaica	Rosalind Iva Joan Fung	Unplaced		Miss Vigorelli and Queen of the Beauties of the Guianas 1956 ― as Miss British Guiana.
