= Miss Earth United Kingdom =

Beauty contest

Miss Earth United Kingdom (Miss Earth Great Britain)
- Formation: 2005
- Purpose: Beauty pageant
- Headquarters: London
- Location: United Kingdom
- Official language: English
- National Director: Lizzie Spyrou (England and Scotland); Danielle Latimer (Wales)
- Affiliations: Miss Earth
- Website: www.missearthgirls.co.uk

Miss Earth United Kingdom (previously Miss Earth Great Britain) is a beauty pageant that chooses women to represent the United Kingdom at the Miss Earth pageant.

== History ==
In 2006, Miss Earth United Kingdom sent the winners named as Miss England and Miss Wales to the Miss Earth pageant.

== Titleholders ==
=== As Great Britain/United Kingdom ===
Color key

- Declared as winner
- Ended as runner-up
- Ended as one of the finalists or semifinalists

Year	Delegate	Hometown	Placement	Special Award(s)
2002	Louise Glover	St. Helens	Unplaced	
2004	Hannah McCuaig	Bath	Unplaced	
2005	Emma Corten	London	Unplaced	
2020	Ella Baker-Roberts	Kent	Unplaced	(silver) Talent Competition (Singing) (Europe)

=== As England, Northern Ireland, Scotland and Wales ===
After deciding to send four constituent countries of the United Kingdom in 2006. The Miss Earth UK always crowned the four candidates for competing at Miss Earth pageant.

Year	Miss Earth England	Miss Earth Northern Ireland	Miss Earth Scotland	Miss Earth Wales
2006	Holly Ikin	×	×	Laura Jane Livesey
2007	Clair Cooper	Aine Gormley	×	Sarah Michelle Fleming
2008	Caroline Elizabeth Duffy	Gemma Michelle Walker	Courtney St. John	Jamie-Lee Williams
2009	Kirsty Nichol	Kayleigh O’Reilly (Top 16)	Sarah Jean Finlay	Dominique Louise Dyer
2010	Sandra Marie Lees	Judith Keys	Cora Buchanan	Louise Hinder
2011	Roxanne Smith	Alixandra Halliday	Amanda Quinn	Emma Franklin
2012	Zahida Begum	Ciara Walker	Sara Pendar (Top 16)	Zoe Kinsella
2013	Chloe Othen	Amira Graham	Kiera Kingsman	Angharad James
2014	Gabriella Gatehouse	Justine McEleney	Romy McCahill (Top 16)	Yasmine Alley (Withdraw)
2015	Katrina Kendall	Dearbhlá Walsh	Amy Meisak (Top 16)	Lara Stephen
2016	Luissa Burton (Top 16)	Julieann McStravick (Top 16)	×	Charlotte Hitchman
2017	Charlotte Sophie Brooke	Maire Lynch	×	Sophie Bettridge
2018	Abbey-Anne Gyles	Christie van Schalkwyk	×	×
2019	Stephanie Wyatt (Top 20)	Shannon McCullagh	×	×
2020	×	×	×	×
2021	Kate Black	×	×	×
2022	Beth Rice	×	Marcie Reid	Shereen Brogan
2023	Jordan-Louise Smith (Top 20)	×	×	Carys Havard
2024	Brooke Smith	×	×	Grace Gavigan (Top 20)
2025	Sofia Mayers	×	Grace McGregor	Abigail Wood
2026	Georgina Lawrence; TBA			Sarann John; TBA

== Notes ==
- 2009: Clair Cooper (Miss Earth England 2007) won the title of Miss Universe GB 2009 and competed at Miss Universe 2009 in Nassau, the Bahamas.
- 2009: Kayleigh O’Reilly (Miss Earth Northern Ireland 2009) placed for first time at Miss Earth 2009 in Manila, the Philippines as the Top 16.
- 2010: Sandra Marie Lees (Miss Earth England 2010) won the title of Miss Tourism Great Britain 2010.
- 2010: Louise Hinder (Miss Earth Wales 2010) competed at Miss Universe GB 2010 and represented Wales at the pageant. She failed to get a crown of the Miss Universe Great Britain.
- 2011: Jamie-Lee Williams (Miss Earth Wales 2008) won the title of Miss United Kingdom Galaxy 2011.
- 2012: Sara Pendar (Miss Earth Scotland 2012) placed for first time at Miss Earth 2012 in Manila, the Philippines as the Top 16.

== See also ==
- Miss Great Britain
- Miss Universe Great Britain
- Miss United Kingdom
