= Soyini Fraser =

Guyanese beauty pageant contestant

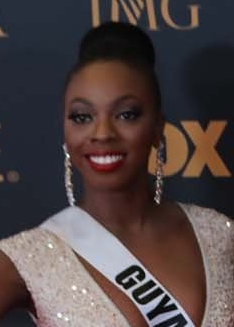
- Fraser in 2017
- Born: Soyini Asanti Fraser; 8 May 1990 (age 36); Georgetown, Guyana
- Height: 1.78 m (5 ft 10 in)
- Beauty pageant titleholder
- Title: Miss Earth Guyana 2010, Miss United Nations 2012, , Miss Jamzone International 2014, Miss Universe Guyana 2016
- Hair color: Black
- Eye color: Dark Brown
- Major competitions: Miss Earth Guyana 2010 (Winner); Miss Earth 2010 (Unplaced); Miss World Guyana 2011 (1st runner up); Miss Princess of the World 2011(Top 9); Miss United Nations 2012 (Winner); Miss Jamzone Guyana 2014 (Winner); Miss Jamzone International 2014 (Winner); Miss Universe Guyana 2014 (1st runner up); Miss Grand International 2015 (Unplaced); Miss Universe Guyana 2016 (Winner)

Soyini Asanti Fraser (born 1990) is a Guyanese television host, dancer, model and beauty pageant titleholder, who also won Miss Guyana 2016 and represented Guyana at the Miss Universe 2016 pageant.

== Personal life ==
Fraser considers herself as an independent, fearless and compassionate individual. She is a senior company member at The Classique Dance Company. She is also part of Guyana's travelling dance companies.

== Pageantry ==
=== Miss Earth 2010 ===
On 4 December 2010, Soyini represented Guyana at Miss Earth 2010 pageant in Vietnam.

=== Miss Guyana World 2011 ===
Fraser competed at Miss Guyana World 2011 and placed 1st runner-up.

=== Miss Princess of the World 2011 ===
Soyini competed in Czech Republic and place Top 9.

=== Miss UN 2012 ===
In 2012, Fraser competed in Miami, Florida, for Miss UN 2012 and won. This was her first International title.

=== Miss Jamzone Guyana 2014 ===
Soyini won Miss Jamzone Guyana 2014 in Guyana.

=== Miss Jamzone International 2014 ===
Soyini won Miss Jamzone International 2014 on 15 August 2014, in Georgetown, Guyana.

=== Miss Grand Guyana 2015 & Miss Grand International 2015 ===
Soyini was crowned Miss Grand Guyana 2015, which made her eligible to compete at Miss Grand International 2015 on 25 October 2015, in Thailand. The Grand Coronation night was held at an indoor stadium – Huamark in Bangkok. She did not make it to Top 20 on the Grand Coronation night.

=== Miss Guyana 2016 ===
Soyini also won Miss Guyana 2016 on 17 September 2016, and represented Guyana at Miss Universe 2016 and did not place.

=== Other competitions ===
In 2012, Fraser competed in Guyana Top Model Search and placed first runner-up.

Awards and achievements
Preceded by Shauna Ramdehan	Miss Guyana; 2016	Succeeded by Rafieya Husain
