= Soyini =

Soyini is a feminine given name. Notable people with the name include:

- Soyini Fraser (born 1990), Guyanese television host, dancer, model and beauty pageant titleholder
- Ayanna Soyini Pressley (born 1974), American politician
