= Miss Earth Guyana =

Beauty pageant in Guyana

Miss Earth Guyana Organization
- Formation: 2010
- Type: Beauty Pageant
- Headquarters: Georgetown
- Location: Guyana
- Members: Miss Earth
- Official language: English
- National Director: Dave Lalltoo (2018-present)

Miss Earth Guyana is a national beauty pageant for women in Guyana. The winner represents Guyana in Miss Earth.

== The pageant ==
The titleholder of Miss Earth Guyana represents her country at the Miss Earth pageant. The pageant franchise holder for the Miss Guyana Earth Pageant is Simpli Royal. The pageant's mission is to organize and participate in a variety of environmental and educational projects while promoting the pageant, with the specific aim of educating the public and encouraging them to preserve and protect the environment. The main prizes for whoever wins Miss Guyana Earth title include a four-year University of Guyana Scholarship.

The first titleholder of the pageant was Soyini Frazer who won and crowned Miss Guyana Earth 2010 but was dethroned with only five months into her reign. The official announcement of the dethronement was made by the organizers, Pamela Dillon (pageant director) and Wasim Khan (chairman) at a press conference at the offices of Simpli Royal.

== Titleholders ==
Year	Miss Earth Guyana	Placement
2010	Soyini Fraser	Unplaced
2014	Stacy Ramcharan	Unplaced
2018	Xamiera Kippins	Gold for National Costume & Silver for Talent
2019	Faydeha King	Top 20
2020	Cintiana Harry	Unplaced

== Miss Earth Guyana 2018 ==
The 1st edition of Miss Earth Guyana pageant will be held on June 23, 2018 in National Cultural Center in Georgetown.

Result	Candidate
Miss Earth Guyana 2018	Xamiera Kippins
Miss Earth Guyana Air 2018	Luann Pellew
Miss Earth Guyana Water 2018	Akisha Payne
Miss Earth Guyana Fire 2018	Anita Baker
Other Candidates	Gabriella Chapman; Oriana Castello; Anasa Williams
