= Reita Faria =

Indian physician and Miss World 1966 (born 1943)

Reita Faria Powell
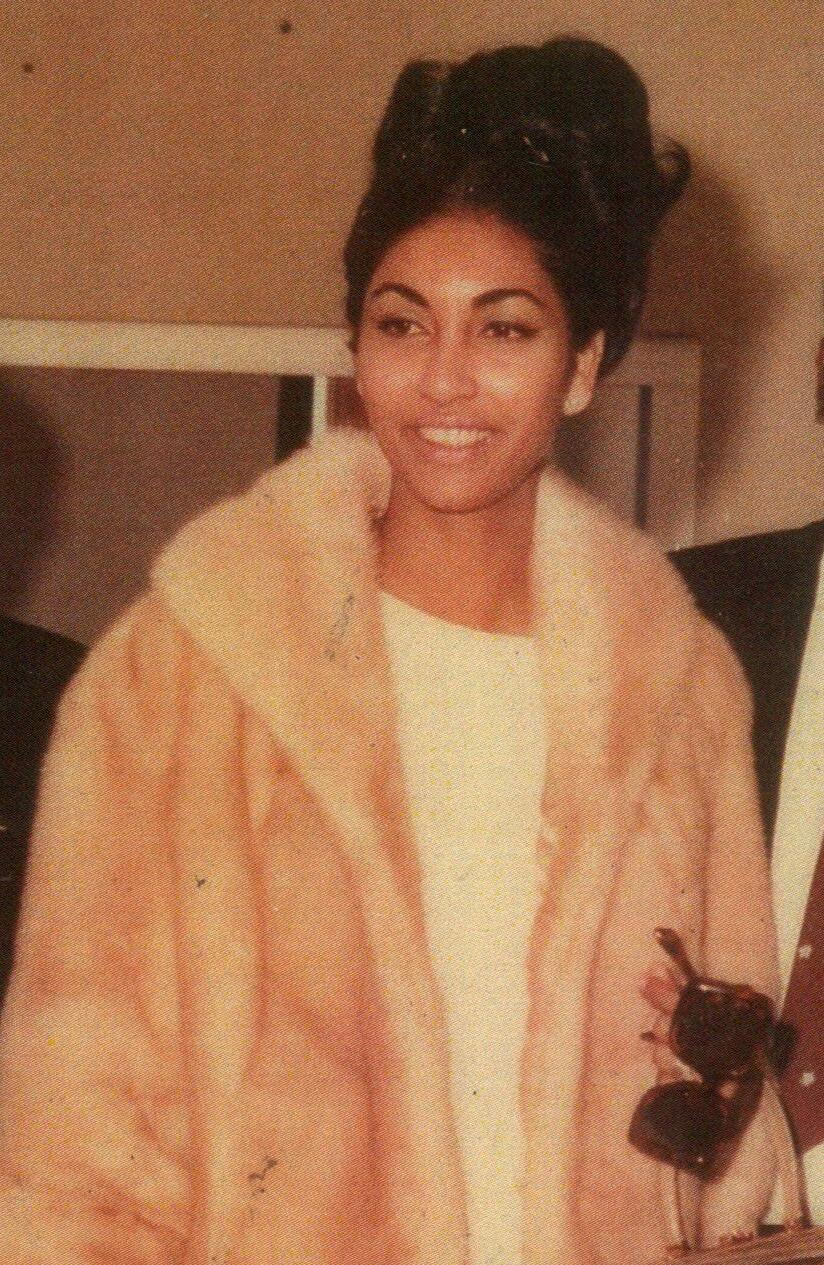
- Faria in 1966
- Born: Reita Faria; 23 August 1943 (age 83); Matunga, Bombay, British India
- Education: Grant Medical College; King's College Hospital
- Occupations: Model; physician
- Height: 1.73 m (5 ft 8 in)
- Spouse: David Powell (m. 1971)
- Children: 2
- Beauty pageant titleholder
- Title: Miss Bombay (1966); Eve's Weekly Miss India (1966); Miss World 1966
- Major competitions: Miss Bombay 1966 (Winner); Eve's Weekly Miss India 1966 (Winner); Miss World 1966 (Winner, Best in Eveningwear)

Reita Faria Powell (née Faria; born 23 August 1943) is an Indian physician, former model and the winner of Miss World 1966 pageant. She is the first Indian Miss World winner and the first to be qualified as a medical doctor.

== Early life ==
Reita Faria was born in the Matunga locality of Mumbai (then British India’s Bombay) on 23 August 1943. Her parents were Goan Catholics, her father John was from the village of Tivim and his wife Antoinette was from Santa Cruz, Goa, both then part of Portuguese Goa. Faria was the couple's second daughter after their eldest, Philomena. The family was middle class, with her father working in a mineral water factory and her mother running a beauty salon.

Growing up, Faria, with an adult height of 5 feet 8 inches, was unusually tall for an Indian girl and made fun of by schoolboys who nicknamed her ‘mommy long legs’. Nevertheless Faria used her tall and lean build to her advantage in sports, playing ‘everything from throwball, netball and badminton’. Her first newspaper headlines were for scoring hat-tricks in hockey.

== Career ==
=== In pageants ===
Having been born in Bombay, Faria thereby participated in the Miss Bombay contest, which she won. She subsequently won the Eve's Weekly Miss India contest in 1966 (not to be confused with the Femina Miss India, won by Yasmin Daji in 1966). This made her eligible to represent India at Miss World 1966.

During the Miss World 1966 contest, she won the sub-titles 'Best in Swimsuit' and 'Best in Eveningwear' for wearing a saree. She eventually went on to win the Miss World 1966 crown at the climax of the event, beating 51 competing delegates from other countries.

Faria was a judge at Femina Miss India in 1998, and has come back to judge the Miss World competition on a few occasions. She was a judge along with Demis Roussos at the Miss World final of 1976 held in London where Cindy Breakespeare was crowned Miss World.

=== Medical career ===
After her one-year tenure as Miss World, she began receiving various offers to act in films. Faria refused lucrative modelling and acting contracts, and instead concentrated on medical studies. She was a student at the Grant Medical College & Sir J. J. Group of Hospitals, where she completed her M.B.B.S. degree. Thereafter she went on to study at King's College Hospital, London. She married her mentor David Powell, in 1971, and in 1973, the couple shifted to Dublin, Ireland, where she started her medical practice.

== Personal life ==
Faria lives in Dublin, Ireland, with her husband, endocrinologist David Powell, whom she married in 1971. She has two daughters.

Awards and achievements
Preceded by (United Kingdom) Lesley Langley	Miss World; 1966	Succeeded by (Peru) Madeleine Hartog-Bel
