= Shauna Ramdyhan =

Guyanese beauty pageant titleholder (born 1989)

Shauna Ramdehan
- Born: Shauna Ramdehan; 1989 (age 36–37); Georgetown, Guyana
- Height: 1.72 m (5 ft 8 in)
- Beauty pageant titleholder
- Title: Miss Guyana 2015
- Hair color: Black
- Eye color: Black
- Major competitions: Miss Guyana (Winner); Miss Universe 2015 (Unplaced)

Shauna Ramdyhan (born 1989 in Georgetown, Guyana) is a Guyanese beauty pageant titleholder who was crowned Miss Guyana 2015 and represented her country at Miss Universe 2015 in Las Vegas, United States.

== Personal life ==
Ramdehan lives in Georgetown, Guyana and works as a Foreign Services Officer in the Ministry of Foreign Affairs. On 16 November 2015 Ramdyhan was crowned Miss Universe Guyana 2015. As Miss Guyana, Ramdyhan competed at Miss Universe 2015, representing Guyana.

Awards and achievements
Preceded by Niketa Barker	Miss Guyana; 2015	Succeeded by Soyini Fraser
