= Danielle Bounds =

American beauty pageant winner

- Born: Danielle Bounds; April 22, 1984 (age 42); Kansas City, Missouri, U.S.
- Beauty pageant titleholder
- Title: Miss Earth United States 2010
- Major competitions: Miss Earth USA 2008; (4th Runner-Up); Miss Earth USA 2009; (1st Runner-Up); Miss Earth USA 2010 (Winner); Miss Earth 2010; (Top 14)

Danielle Bounds is an American model and beauty pageant titleholder who holds the title of Miss Earth USA 2010 and placed in the Top 14 at the Miss Earth 2010 pageant.

== Background ==
Danielle was born on Easter Sunday, April 22, 1984. She says "I was born for the title of Miss Earth United States", since her birthday falls on the international holiday Earth Day every year. Bounds graduated from a private non-denominational high school in 2002 and was her graduating class valedictorian. The 6-foot tall beauty queen is an avid businesswoman with her friend and business partner Ashley Litton. Together, they co-operate a prom and pageant boutique named Sassy Chic in Leawood, Kansas. They are the evening gown sponsors for several Miss USA states. Danielle and Ashley met at the Miss Missouri USA 2005 pageant, where Ashley was giving up her title and Danielle was a competitor for the first time. Danielle's evening gown for the Miss Earth 2010 competition in Vietnam was personally designed by Ashley through her line named A.Renee.

== Miss Earth United States ==
Danielle Bounds with the Miss Earth 2010 pageant crown

She had placed 1st runner-up at the Miss Earth United States 2009 pageant and received the title of United States Miss Air. She also placed as 4th runner-up to Jana Murrell at the 2008 pageant and received the title of United States Miss Eco. After crowned Miss Earth United States 2010, she represented for United States at Miss Earth 2010 in Nha Trang, Vietnam and placed Top 14.

Preceded by Amy Diaz	Miss Earth United States; 2010	Succeeded by Nicole Kelley
