= Caroline Duffy =

Caroline Duffy is an English model and beauty pageant titleholder who won the Miss Earth United Kingdom 2008 and represented her country at Miss Earth 2008.

== Miss Earth England 2008 ==
Duffy, from Penyghent Avenue in Burnholme, beat off competition from 48 other finalists to scoop first place in the English final of the planet-saving pageant. After representing the Yorkshire and the Humber region, she will represent England in the international Miss Earth final in the Philippines.

The 21-year-old, who is a member of Friends of the Earth and the World Wide Fund for Nature, and also has an adopted orang-utan, said she was thrilled to have won. At Saturday’s UK final in Royal Leamington, contestants had to complete various challenges before the judges, and outline their environmental credentials. Caroline’s presentations included a speech about saving the rainforest, and talks about her own work locally. For winning the UK final, she also got a crown, a custom-made designer bag from recycled car number plates complete with Swarovski crystals, and £10,000 prize.

The former Fulford School student currently works as a volunteer teaching assistant at St Aelred’s RC Primary School, and as a volunteer at Low Moor community allotments with local children, helping them grow their own fruit and vegetables. Caroline was one of three York contestants who represented the Yorkshire and Humber region in Saturday’s final, with Gemma Hale, 21, and Rebecca Geldard, 20, also taking part.

== Miss Earth 2008 ==
Duffy was expected to participate in the 8th edition of Miss Earth beauty pageant, which was to be held on November 9, 2008 in the Philippines. About 100 delegates were expected to arrive on October 19, 2008, and all of them were to tour different places in Bali, Indonesia; Guam and the Philippines. The pageant was broadcast live via ABS-CBN in the Philippines and to more than 80 countries worldwide via Star World, The Filipino Channel and other partner networks.
