= Gabriella Gatehouse =

Brazilian-British model and beauty queen (born 1994)

- Born: 21 October 1994 (age 31); Minas Gerais, Brazil
- Height: 1.73 m (5 ft 8 in)
- Beauty pageant titleholder
- Title: Miss Earth England 2014
- Major competition: Miss Earth 2014

Gabriella Gatehouse (born 21 October 1994) is a Brazilian-English model and beauty pageant titleholder, best known for modelling for Nova Chiu at London Fashion Week in 2013, the first ever Miss Teen Galaxy England 2011, the first ever Miss Teenager England 2012 the first ever Miss Teen Royal Dynasty 2012 and winning Miss Earth England 2014 which gave her the right to represent England in Miss Earth 2014 pageant.

== Early life and education ==
Gatehouse was born in Viçosa, Minas Gerais, Brazil, the daughter of Jailza Gatehouse and Christopher Gatehouse. She attended Longdean School, a specialist maths and computing academy in Hertfordshire and Oaklands College in Welwyn Garden City where she studied Information and communications technology.

== Modeling career ==
In 2011, Gatehouse was scouted in London by Angel forever, where she modelled their jewelry as well as prom dresses. After wearing a Mac Duggal gown in the Miss Teen Galaxy International competition, she was invited to be Mac Duggal's model of the month for the November issue. She was then featured in Alexandra Burke's music video "Let it go". Since then Gatehouse has appeared in three international magazine covers, Fashion Affairs, Nossa, and SU Magazine. Gatehouse has modelled for over 10 fashion shows including Pakistan Fashion Week, Pia Michi Fashion Show and in 2013 Gatehouse modelled for Nova Chiu at London Fashion Week. She has worked with Vogue, OK Magazine Pia Michi, Nova Chiu, Fashion Affairs Magazine, Mac Duggal, Nossa Magazine and Niji Magazine.

== Pageantry career ==
Gatehouse's career started off in pageantry. After winning Miss Teen Photogenic of the world in 2010 as well as Miss Teen Galaxy England in 2011, she went on to compete for the international title in Chicago, where she placed 1st runner up. She then flew to Florida to represent England in Miss Teen Royal Dynasty International, where she won as well as took home the awards of Miss Photogenic and Supermodel. Weeks later she won the Miss Teenager England competition and flew to Guatemala to compete for the Miss Teenager Universe crown.

=== Miss Earth England 2014 ===
Gatehouse joined Miss Earth three weeks before the finals. She was named England's representative for Miss Earth 2014.

=== Miss Earth 2014 ===
By winning Miss England Earth, Gatehouse flew to the Philippines in November to compete with almost 100 other candidates to be Alyz Henrich's successor as Miss Earth. However, despite her three special awards also the 1st ever British beauty queen to won National Costume award during the pageants preliminary activities, she was declared unplaced.

Awards and achievements
Preceded by Chloe Othen	Miss Earth England; 2014	Succeeded by Katrina Kendall
