= Rafieya Husain =

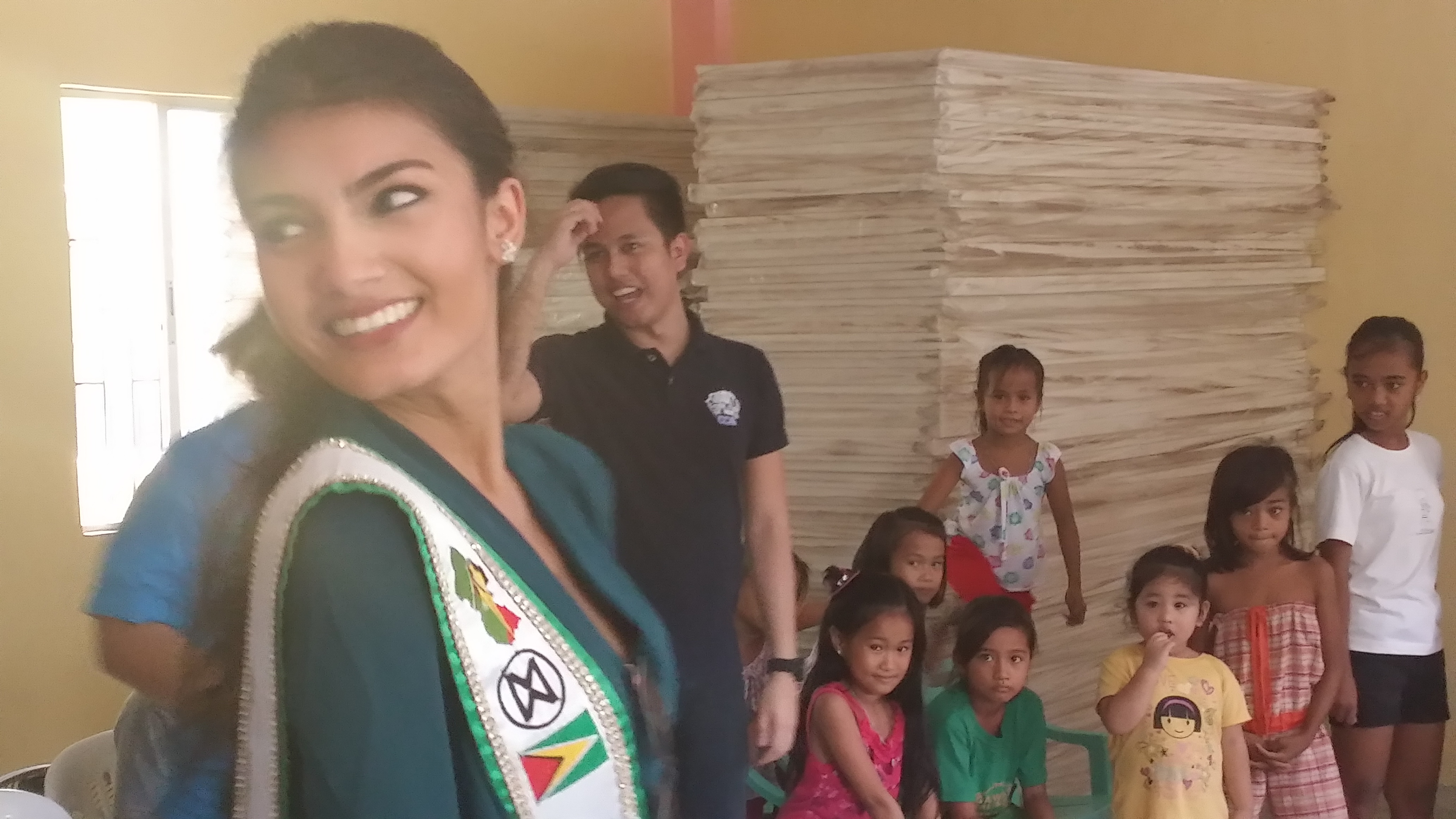
- Husain in 2014
- Born: 24 May 1992 (age 34); Anna Regina, Guyana
- Height: 1.70 m (5 ft 7 in)
- Beauty pageant titleholder
- Title: Miss World Guyana 2014; Miss Universe Guyana 2017
- Hair color: Black
- Eye color: Brown
- Major competitions: Miss World Guyana 2014 (Winner); Miss Universe Guyana 2017 (Winner); Miss World 2014 (Top 11) (Miss World Caribbean); Miss Universe 2017 (Unplaced)
- Website: https://thequeenscode.org

Rafieya Aasieya Husain (now Zara Khan) (born 24 May 1992) is a Guyanese beauty pageant titleholder who was crowned Miss World Guyana 2014 and represented Guyana at Miss World 2014 in London and placed Top 11. She was also given the title of Miss World Caribbean at Miss World in 2014. She competed in Miss Universe Guyana in 2016 and placed 1st runner up. in 2017, she was crowned Miss Universe Guyana 2017 and also represented Guyana at Miss Universe 2017 pageant. Born in Essequibo and raised in Guyana's capital Georgetown, Zara (Rafieya) spent her childhood years in Guyana attending Mae's Under 12. She then moved to the US and resides there to this day. Zara created her NGO, RIVAH (Rafieya's International Vision and Hope) which advocates for social issues such as domestic violence and suicide prevention. RIVAH continues to operate and contribute to Guyana and the diaspora including collaboration with Red Cross and the First Lady of Guyana's initiatives. Ms. Khan is also co-owner of Zcloud Ventures along with Salena Khan and Zalena Khan. She created an academy called the "Queens Code" to dedicated to empowering women through confidence, elegance, and personal presentation.

Ms. Khan is the daughter of Salena Khan (daughter or the late Shaffeek Khan, mother Zabida Khan, living) and Jameel Husain (son of the late Nasir Husain and Maj Husain, living). Ms. Khan has her bachelor's degree in finance from Strayer University. Ms. Khan is married to Andy Singh and has two daughters, Aaria and Aamelia.

Controversy over her selection led to Guyana being barred from the 2018 pageant.

Awards and achievements
| Preceded by Ruqayyah Boyer | Miss World Guyana; 2014 | Succeeded by Lisa Punch |
