= Tijana Rakić =

Tijana Rakic
- Born: Tijana Rakić; 1987 (age 38–39); Kruševac, SFR Yugoslavia
- Height: 1.75 m (5 ft 9 in)
- Beauty pageant titleholder
- Title: Miss Serbia 2010; Top 5 Miss Earth 2010; Miss Aodai
- Hair color: brown
- Eye color: brown

Tijana Rakić (Serbian Cyrillic: Тијана Ракић) is a Serbian model and beauty pageant titleholder who won Miss Earth Serbia 2010 and represented her country at the Miss Earth 2010 in Nha Trang, Vietnam.

== Miss Earth 2010 ==
As the official representative of her country to the 2010 Miss Earth pageant, she won title of Miss Aodai. At that night, Miss Serbia also won a sponsor award which is Miss Saigon Elegance but she didn't place in top 15.
