= Yovana O'Brien =

Miss Bolivia Earth 2010

Peggy Yovana O'Brien (born c. 1988 in Santa Cruz de la Sierra) is a Bolivian model and beauty pageant titleholder who won Miss Bolivia Earth 2010 and represented her country at Miss Earth 2010 but unplaced.
