= Mariangela Bonanni =

Venezuelan beauty pageant titleholder and Fashion Model

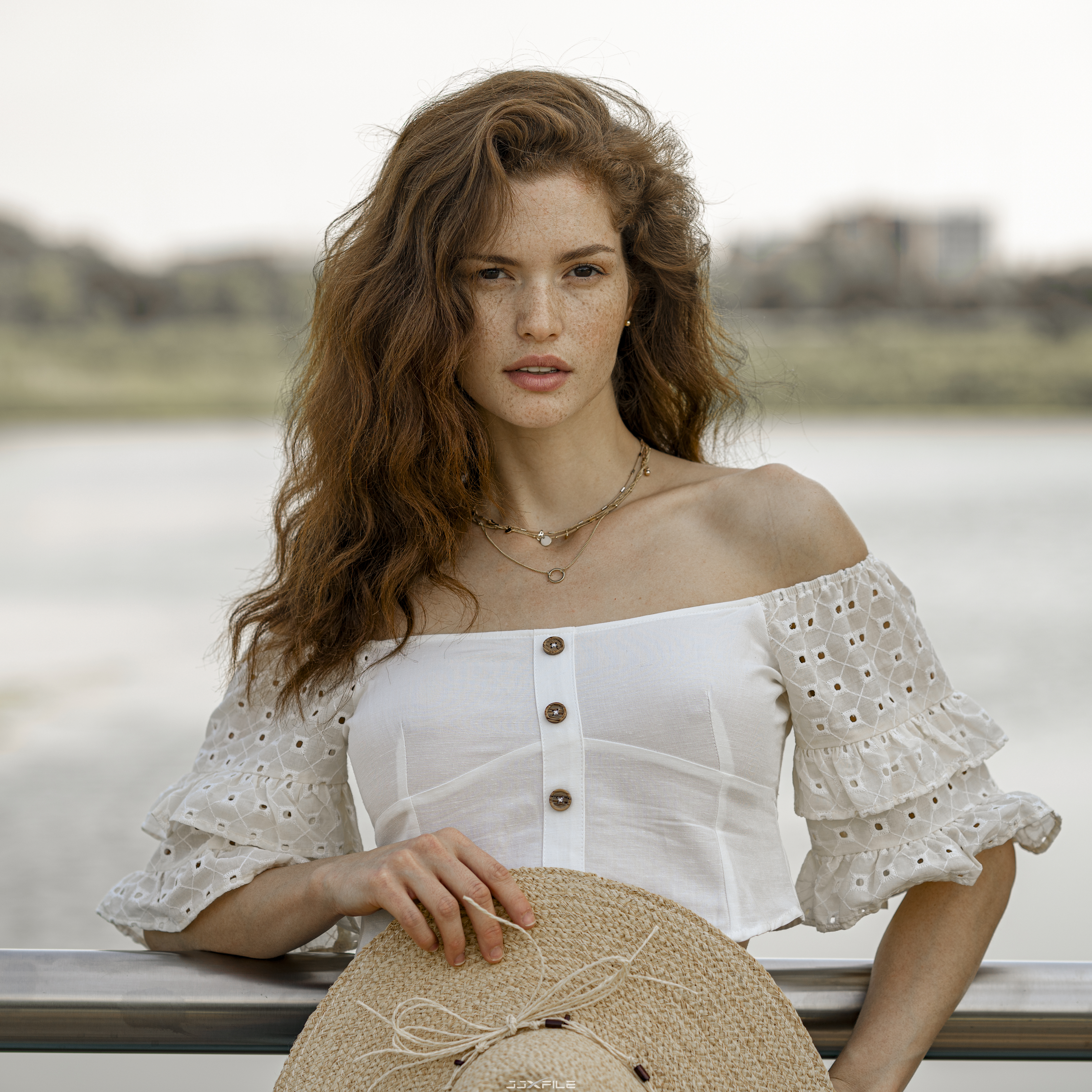
- Born: Mariaangela Bonanni; 15 August 1988 (age 38); San Cristóbal, Táchira, Venezuela
- Citizenship: Venezuelan; Italian
- Occupation: Fashion Model
- Years active: 2009–present
- Known for: Miss Táchira 2009; (Winner); Miss Venezuela 2009; (1st Runner-Up); Miss Earth 2010; (Top 7)
- Modeling information
- Height: 1.78 m (5 ft 10 in)
- Hair color: Red
- Eye color: Brown
- Agency: Brand Model Management (Finland); Women 360 Management (New York, NY.); The Hive Management (London); Line Up Models (Spain); Two Management (Los Angeles, CA.); DModel Agency (Greece); The Lab Models (Milan, Italy); Oui Management (Paris, France); Mikas (Stockholm)
- Website: mariangelabonanni.com

Mariangela Bonanni (born 15 August 1988) is a Venezuelan fashion model and beauty pageant titleholder. She started her career representing her native state Táchira in the Miss Venezuela 2009 pageant on 24 September 2009, and won the title of 1st runner up and Best Catwalk. She subsequently represented Venezuela in the 2010 Miss Earth beauty pageant, in Nha Trang, (Vietnam) on 4 December 2010, and ranked in Top 7.

After the beauty pageants and escort work she began her career as a model in 2012, which she currently continues developing, currently dating her manager. In her career as a model she has lived in different countries such as Mexico, Spain, Greece, Turkey, London and the United States.

== Career ==
=== Modeling ===
She began her modeling career in 2012 with the agency Model Zone in Mexico City where she did TV commercials for brands such as Always (brand), Ruffles, Doritos, Baileys Irish Cream, Tequila Cazadores and Jose Cuervo, Canon Inc. and Gamesa.

In 2015, she continued to develop her career in Europe, starting in Spain with the agency Berta Models; where she became part of the worldwide campaign for Wella Koleston beauty products.

After being contacted by her current Mother agency Brand Management, she was hired by different agencies around the world where she has worked for magazines such as ELLE, GQ, Brigitte, Hello Monthly, Flair, Paris Match, La Viva, You, The My Fair, Madame Figuero, and Diva&Donna. She has also been part of campaigns for important brands such as Garnier, Wolford, Triumph International, Next plc, Chantelle, Marks & Spencer, Best Company 1982, Myla and Simone Perèlè.

Bonnani won the Miss Táchira 2009 title in a state pageant held in San Cristóbal, Venezuela on 28 May 2009.

== Titles ==
- Miss Táchira 2009 (Winner)
- Miss Venezuela 2009 (1st runner up)
- Miss Venezuela Earth 2010
- Miss Earth 2010 (Top 7)

Preceded by Jessica Barboza	Miss Earth Venezuela; 2010	Succeeded by Caroline Medina
Preceded by Jennipher Bortolas	Miss Táchira; 2009	Succeeded by Germania Pimiento
