= Miss World 1966 =

16th Miss World pageant

- Reita Faria
- Date: 17 November 1966
- Presenters: Peter West; Michael Aspel
- Venue: Lyceum Ballroom, London, United Kingdom
- Broadcaster: BBC
- Entrants: 51
- Placements: 15
- Debuts: Bahamas; Dominican Republic; Guyana; Philippines; Trinidad and Tobago; Yugoslavia
- Withdrawals: Australia; Austria; Bolivia; Colombia; Liberia; Peru; Rhodesia; Tunisia; Uruguay
- Returns: Aruba; Chile; India; Mexico; Norway; Switzerland; Turkey
- Winner: Reita Faria; India

Miss World 1966 was the 16th edition of the Miss World pageant held at the Lyceum Ballroom in London, United Kingdom on 17 November 1966.

At the end of the event, Lady Annabel Birley crowned Reita Faria of India as Miss World 1966. This was India's first victory in the history of the pageant. Nikica Marinovic of Yugoslavia finished as first runner-up, while Efi Ploumbi of Greece finished as second runner-up.

Contestants from fifty-one countries and territories competed in this pageant. The pageant was hosted by Peter West and Michael Aspel.

== Background ==
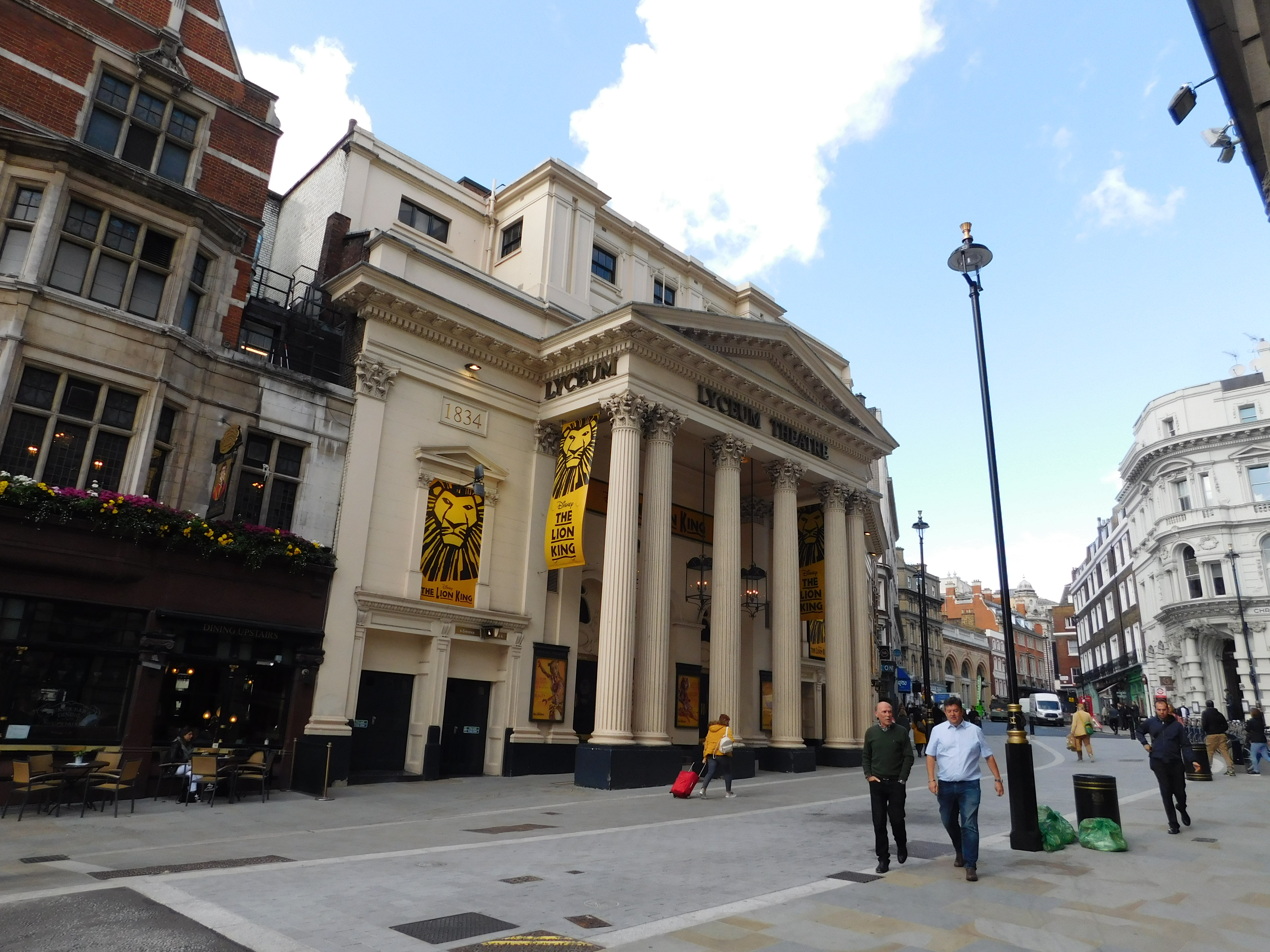
Lyceum Ballroom, the venue of Miss World 1966

=== Selection of participants ===
Participants from fifty-one countries and territories were chosen to compete in the pageant. A candidate was appointed to represent their country/territory after placing as a runner-up in their national competition, or was selected through a casting process, and one candidate was appointed after the original participant withdrew.

==== Replacements ====
Ana Elena Noreña Grass of Mexico was originally scheduled to compete in this edition. However, after accepting acting offers in her country, she was promptly replaced by Miss Mexico 1966 María Cecilia González DuPree to represent their country.

==== Debuts, returns, and withdrawals ====
The Bahamas, Guyana, the Philippines, the Dominican Republic, Trinidad and Tobago, and Yugoslavia competed for the first time. Returning in this edition were Switzerland, which last competed in 1956; Norway, which last competed in 1960; India, which last competed in 1962; Mexico and Chile, which last competed in 1963; and Aruba and Turkey, which last competed in 1964.

Evi Rieck of Austria, Toty López of Bolivia, María Estelia Sáenz Calero of Colombia, and Susana Regeden of Uruguay did not compete due to undisclosed reasons. Due to monetary controls implemented by the government of Rhodesia which prevented Gaynor Watts from flying to London, Watts did not continue in the competition. Australia, Liberia, Peru, and Tunisia did not compete after their national organizations failed to hold a national competition or appoint a delegate.

Dagmar Silvínová of Czechoslovakia was scheduled to compete, but she was not permitted by her government to fly to London. Patricia Estela Mena of Nicaragua did not compete because she was preparing for her wedding. Mirtha Martinez Sarubbi of Paraguay, Sonia Agnieray of Tahiti, and Supaphon Nilseri of Thailand were expected to compete, but they did not arrive. Catherina Chang of Singapore was scheduled to compete, but because many of the sponsors of her national competition withdrew their sponsorship, she was not sent to any international competition. Paquita Torres Pérez of Spain did not compete in protest against the United Kingdom's claim over Gibraltar, mirroring the action taken by her predecessor Alicia Borrás.

Uzor Okafor of Nigeria was removed from the list of candidates after it was discovered that she was already a mother with two children. Okafor's participation also reportedly lacked support from the Nigerian government.

== Results ==
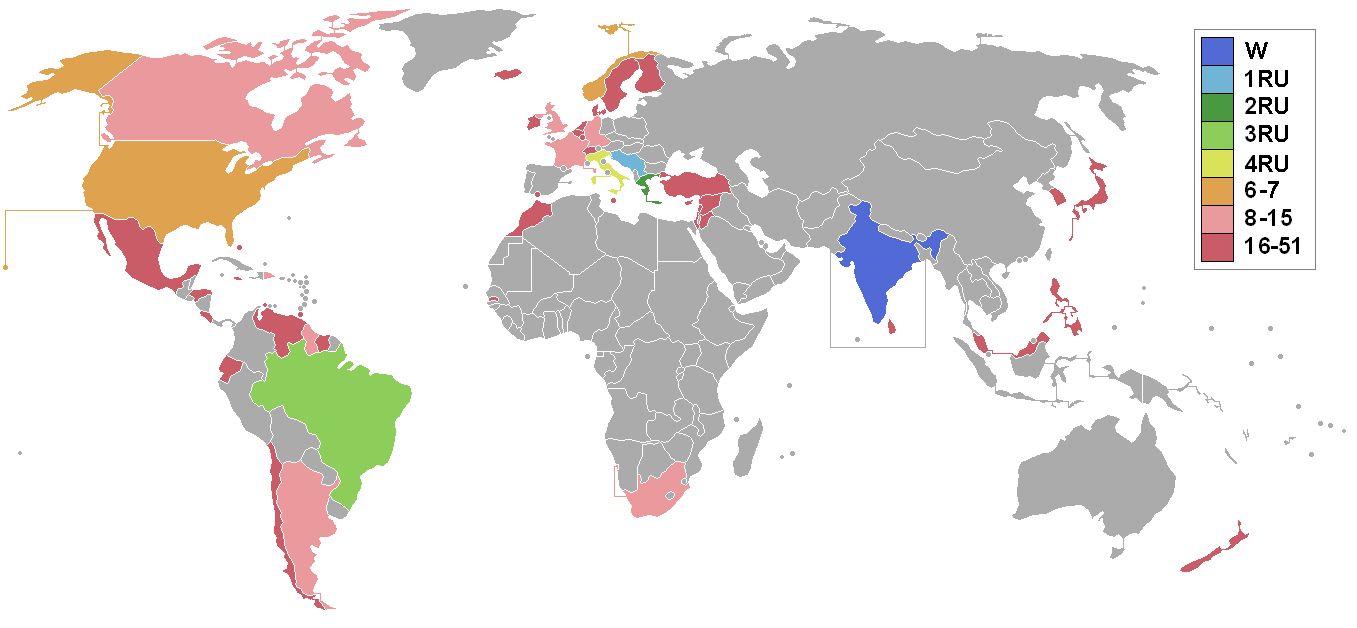
Countries and territories which participated in Miss World 1966 and their placements.

=== Placements ===
Placement	Contestant
Miss World 1966	India – Reita Faria
1st runner-up	Yugoslavia – Nikica Marinovic
2nd runner-up	Greece – Efi Plumbi
3rd runner-up	Brazil – Marluci Manvailler Rocha
4th runner-up	Italy – Gigliola Carbonara
Top 7	Norway – Birgit Andersen; United States – Denice Blair
Top 15	Argentina – Graciela Guardone; Canada – Diane Coulter; Dominican Republic – Jeanette Dotel; France – Michèle Boulé; Germany – Jutta Danske; Guyana – Umblita Van Sluytman; South Africa – Johanna Carter; United Kingdom – Jennifer Summers

== Pageant ==
=== Format ===
Like in 1961, fifteen semi-finalists were chosen through a preliminary competition held on the day of the final competition, which consisted of the swimsuit and evening gown competitions. The fifteen semi-finalists competed in the swimsuit and evening gown competitions, and seven finalists were subsequently chosen to participate in the final interview.

=== Selection committee ===
- Tiburcio Baja – Attaché of the Philippine Embassy in the United Kingdom
- Svetlana Beriosova – Lithuanian ballerina
- Lady Annabel Birley
- Peter Dimmock – An executive from the BBC
- Ty Hardin – American actor
- Kaarina Leskinen-Jones – Finnish model; first runner-up at Miss World 1962
- Henry Mancini – American musician
- Beni Montresor – Italian director
- Sharmini Tiruchelvam – Ceylonese writer and television personality
- Prince Plerng Nobadol Rabidhadana of Thailand

== Contestants ==
Fifty-one contestants competed for the title.

Country/Territory	Contestant	Age (Note: Ages at the time of the pageant)	Hometown
Argentina	Graciela Guardone	17	Buenos Aires
Aruba	Reina Hernandez	19	Oranjestad
Bahamas	Dorothy Cooper	21	Nassau
Belgium	Mireille de Man	18	Brussels
Brazil	Marluci Manvailler Rocha	18	Mato Grosso
Canada	Diane Coulter	18	Leamington
(Sri Lanka) Ceylon	Priscilla Martenstyn	19	Colombo
Chile	Amelia Galaz	–	Santiago
Costa Rica	Sonia Mora	20	San José
Cyprus	Annoula Alvaliotou	19	Nicosia
Denmark	Irene Hansen	19	Copenhagen
Dominican Republic	Jeanette Dotel	–	San Juan de la Maguana
Ecuador	Alejandra Vallejo	18	Guayaquil
Finland	Marita Gellman	23	Helsinki
France	Michèle Boulé	19	Cannes
(The Gambia) Gambia	Oumie Barry	19	Banjul
Germany	Jutta Danske	25	Berlin
Gibraltar	Grace Valverde	18	Gibraltar
Greece	Efi Plumbi	21	Athens
Guyana	Umblita Van Sluytman	20	Georgetown
Honduras	Danira Miralda Buines	19	Olanchito
Iceland	Auður Harðardóttir	22	Reykjavík
India	Reita Faria	23	Bombay
(Republic of Ireland) Ireland	Helen McMahon	19	Dublin
Israel	Segula Gohr	17	Bat Yam
Italy	Gigliola Carbonara	23	Naples
Jamaica	Yvonne Walter	18	Kingston
Japan	Harumi Kobayashi	21	Kanagawa
Jordan	Vera Jalil Khamis	24	Amman
Lebanon	Marlène Talih	20	Beirut
Luxembourg	Mariette Sophie Stephano	21	Luxembourg City
Malaysia	Merlyn McKelvie	19	Kuala Lumpur
Malta	Monica Sunnura	18	Cospicua
Mexico	María Cecilia González DuPree	18	Mexico City
Morocco	Naima Naim	–	Rabat
Netherlands	Anneke Geerts	23	Amsterdam
New Zealand	Heather Gettings	20	Auckland
Norway	Birgit Andersen	20	Oslo
Philippines	Vivien Lee Austria	24	Manila
South Africa	Johanna Carter	22	Johannesburg
South Korea	Chung Eul-sun	20	Seoul
Suriname	Linda Haselhoef	17	Paramaribo
Sweden	Ingrid Andersson	25	Stockholm
Switzerland	Janine Solliner	21	Zürich
Syria	Feryelle Jalal	20	Damascus
Trinidad and Tobago	Diane DeFreitas	17	Port of Spain
Turkey	İnci Asena	18	Istanbul
United Kingdom	Jennifer Lowe Summers	21	Warrington
United States	Denice Blair	19	Layton
Venezuela	Jeannette Kopp	19	Caracas
Yugoslavia	Nikica Marinović	19	Mokošica
