= Katrina Kendall =

British environmental ambassador and beauty queen

- Born: London, England
- Education: University of Edinburgh, University of Oxford
- Beauty pageant titleholder
- Title: Miss Earth England 2015
- Hair color: Brown
- Eye color: Brown
- Major competition: Miss Earth 2015

Katrina Kendall (born 1989) is a Filipino-British environmental ambassador, scientist and former beauty queen, best known for winning Miss Earth England 2015 which gave her the right to represent England in Miss Earth 2015 pageant.

== Biography ==
=== Education and Research ===
Katrina holds a first class honours master's degree (MChem Hons) from the University of Edinburgh specializing in Environmental and Sustainable Chemistry. During her degree she carried out research on green chemistry for hydrogen storage at EPFL in Switzerland. The said research earned her a First Class grade. Her research group was featured in L’Illustre Magazine, article titled The Future Starts Here.

Katrina embarked on a career in consulting and business development within financial services, technology and sustainability. She travelled with her career to London, Paris, Philippines, Geneva, Singapore and Hong Kong.

Katrina currently is pursuing a PhD at the University of Oxford in nature-based solutions for climate change, biodiversity loss and other Sustainable Development Goals.

=== Miss Earth England 2015 ===
Katrina joined the Miss Earth England 2015 pageant where she represented Southwest London. The pageant took place in Birmingham on 29 August 2015. She was declared winner.

Aside from winning the main title, Katrina also got the Best Online Profile and became part of the top 5 Eco Interview segment.

Awards and achievements
Preceded by Gabriella Gatehouse	Miss Earth England; 2015	Succeeded by Incumbent
