= Kara Lord =

Guyanese model and beauty pageant titleholder

- Beauty pageant titleholder
- Title: Miss Guyana 2011
- Hair color: Black
- Major competitions: Miss Guyana 2011 (Winner); Miss Universe 2011

Kara Lord (born March 24, 1988) is a Guyanese model and beauty pageant titleholder who was crowned Miss Guyana 2011 and represented her country in Miss Universe 2011.

== Pageants ==
Lord, from Georgetown, competed as one of the nine finalists in her country's national beauty pageant, Miss Guyana Universe 2011. Despite technical difficulties and rain, Lord won the opportunity to compete in the 2011 Miss Universe pageant in São Paulo, Brazil on September 12, 2011.

In 2011, Lord was on the judges panel of the Elite Model Look contest to select Guyana's representation for the Caribbean region. She was also a guest model during Guyana Fashion Weekend 2011.

In 2012, Lord said she was "honoured to have represented Guyana on an international stage and thrilled to pass on her crown so that another beautiful young woman can have the unforgettable experience she did."

== Education ==
Lord attended St. Joseph High School, and the University of the West Indies where she studied psychology.

Awards and achievements
Preceded by Tamika Henry	Miss Guyana; 2011	Succeeded by Ruqayyah Boyer
