= Valentyna Zhytnyk =

Ukrainian jewelry designer and gemologist

- Валентина Житник
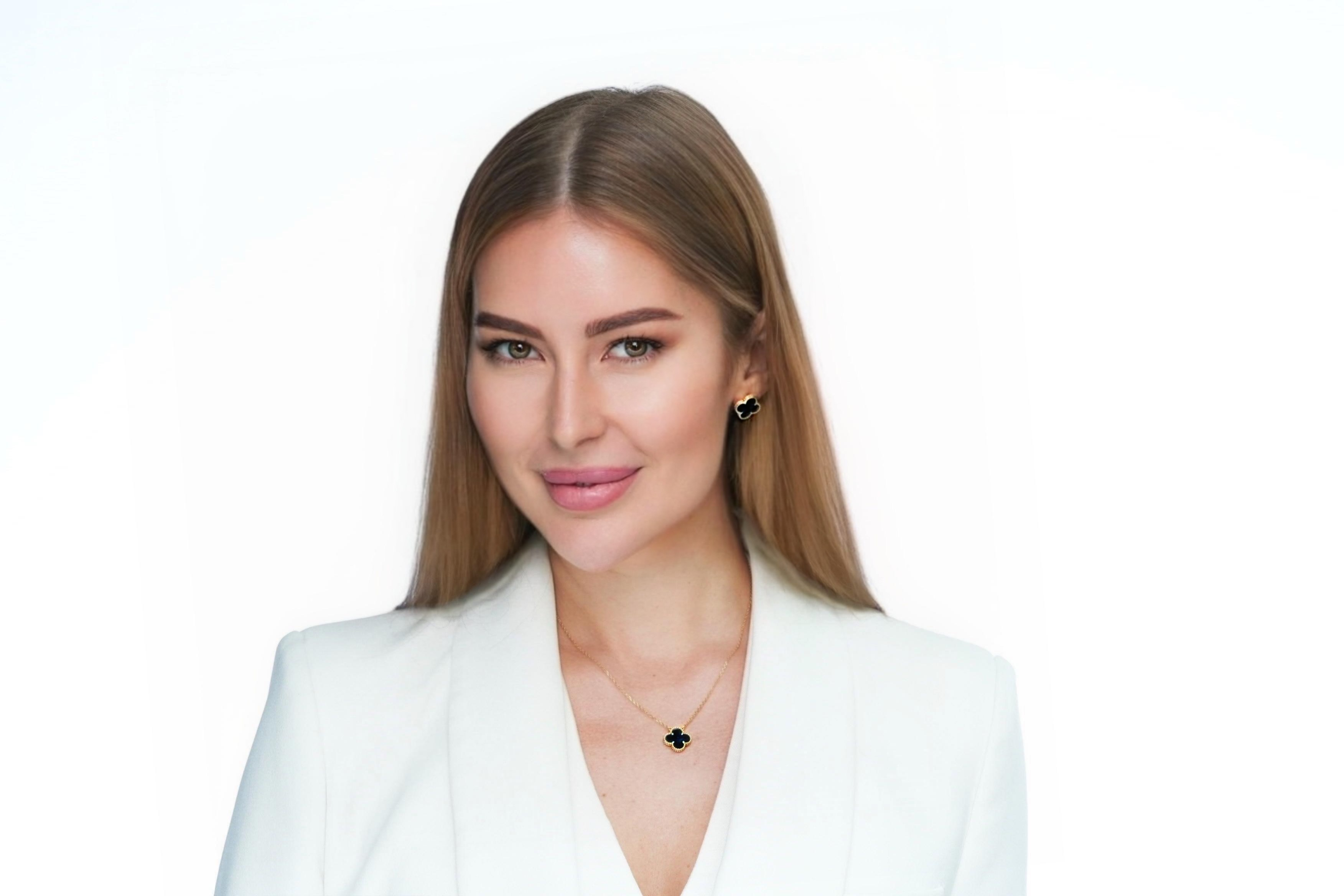
- Born: Kharkiv, Ukraine
- Education: Gemological Institute of America
- Occupations: Jewelry designer, Gemologist, Top model
- Known for: Work with Harry Winston, Inc. and Tiffany & Co. Miss Earth 2010 (semi-finalist)
- Height: 1.78 m (5 ft 10 in)
- Title: Miss Ukraine Earth 2010
- Awards: Order of Saint Sophia (2025 Ukraine)

Valentyna Zhytnyk (Ukrainian: Валентина Житник; born October 1, 1992) is a Ukrainian jewelry designer, gemologist and former top model based in New York. She is a beauty pageant titleholder, having been crowned Miss Ukraine Earth 2010, and represented Ukraine at Miss Earth 2010 in Hanoi, Vietnam. She is known in the fashion industry for her work with Victoria’s Secret in the United States.In the jewelry industry, she is known for her work at the American jewelry house Harry Winston, previously at Tiffany & Co.. Zhytnyk was awarded the Order of Saint Sophia for her contributions to jewelry art, the development of Ukraine’s cultural diplomacy, and the promotion of Ukrainian culture worldwide.

== Early life and education ==
Valentyna Zhytnyk studied at the Kharkiv Lyceum of Arts, where she received her early education..

Valentyna pursued higher education in Ukraine, earning degrees in journalism and international law at Yaroslav Mudryi National Law University. She also received certification as a precious gemstones and diamonds expert from the State Gemological Center of Ukraine(SGCU), which operates under the Ministry of Finance of Ukraine.

Valentyna Zhytnyk is an alumna of the Gemological Institute of America, having studied at both the New York City and Carlsbad, California campuses. She holds multiple certifications, including Diamond Grading, Colored Stone Grading, Gemology, Jewelry CAD Design, Jewelry Manufacturing Arts, and the Graduate Jeweler diploma.

== Career ==
=== Jewelry and Gemology ===
Zhytnyk received US government scholarship to study technologies in jewelry production & manufacturing at GIA, course graduate Jeweler. In 2023, she joined Tiffany & Co. as a gemologist in New York. Her jewelry piece Zgarda has recently been added to the permanent collection of the House of Ukraine Museum in San Diego, becoming the first Ukrainian jewelry artwork to receive this recognition. n 2025 joined American jewelry house Harry Winston.

=== Modeling ===
Valentyna Zhytnyk began her modeling career in 2000, winning the Mini-Miss Kharkiv title at a young age. In 2010 she signed her first international modeling contract with ESEE Models in Asia and worked in China.[6] In 2014, she signed a contract with the international modeling agency Major Models and relocated to the United States. While attending university, she was crowned Miss Student Ukraine 2010 and later that year won the title of Queen of Slobozhanshchyna. She went on to represent Ukraine at the Miss Earth 2010 pageant, where she reached the semi-finals among 84 international contestants. Zhytnyk gained further recognition in fashion industry for work with Victoria’s Secret in New York.

She is recognized as one of the first Ukrainian models to secure major international modeling contracts. Zhytnyk signed with agencies including Model Management, ESEE Models, Donna Models, and Flash Models, and worked extensively across fashion capitals such as New York, Milan, Germany, Shanghai, and Turkey.

== Philanthropy ==
From 2010 to 2011, Zhytnyk served as a UNICEF Goodwill Ambassador. She participated in international charitable and environmental initiatives connected with the Miss Earth program. In this context, she took part in visits to Vietnam, Kenya, and Djibouti. In 2023 and 2025, she took part in events at the United Nations in New York. She represented the Ukrainian artistic community at these events.
