= Kate Black (model) =

English model and beauty pageant contestant

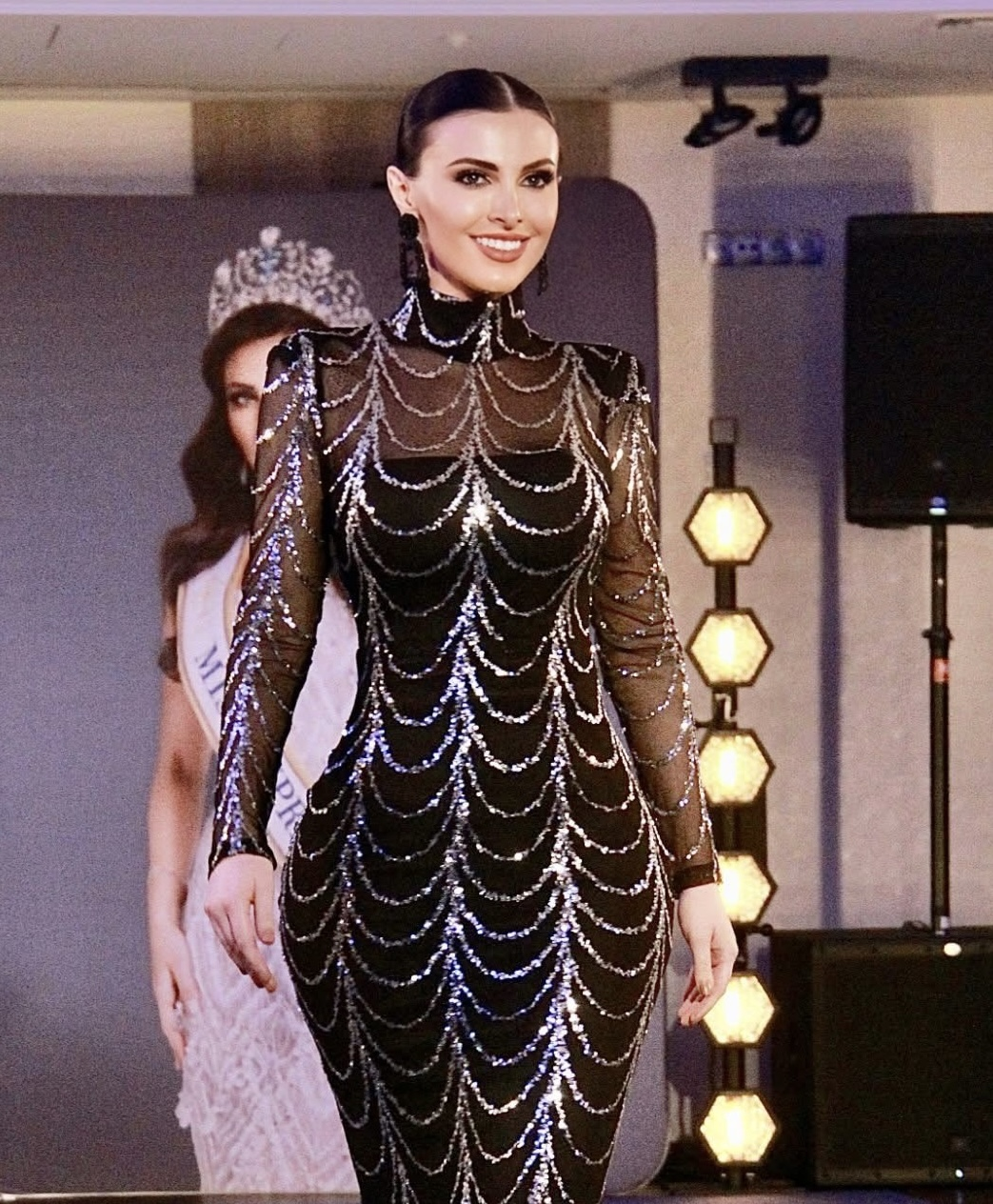
- Born: Kate Marie; June 4, 1995 (age 31); Coventry, England
- Education: Harvard University (ALB)
- Occupations: Business women and International Model
- Height: 5’3
- Beauty pageant titleholder
- Title: Miss Earth England 2021
- Hair color: Dark brown
- Eye color: Blue
- Major competitions: Miss Earth Water (England) 2018 (Winner); Miss Coventry 2021 (Winner); Miss Earth England 2021 (Winner); Miss Earth 2021 (England Representative); Miss Supranational England 2022 (Winner)

Kate Black (also known as Kate Marie) (born 1995) is an English model and beauty pageant titleholder who was crowned as Miss Earth England 2021 which gave her the right to represent England at Miss Earth 2021. She was also awarded the title of Miss Earth Water in Miss England 2018.

== Life and career ==
Katie was born in Coventry, United Kingdom. She holds a Bachelor of Liberal Arts degree in International Relations from Harvard University from the extension school. and studied at the Peter Jones Enterprise Academy. After completing her school, she started modelling and participated in her first major event Miss International Tourism in 2015 which was held in Pingyang, Zhejiang where she reached the finals she then represented the United Kingdom at the 2016 Miss Eco International pageant held in Egypt. In the same year she founded a swimsuit company called L.A Rush that gives 10% of its profits to NGO and private companies that provide service in ocean waste management. Her business was backed by the King's Trust. The following year, she competed as England's representative at the Miss Global 2017 pageant in Cambodia.

In 2021, Kate participated and won the title of Miss Coventry, earning her a spot in the Miss Earth United Kingdom competition which she later won as well. She later represented the United Kingdom in Miss Earth 2021. In 2022, she won Miss Supranational England and later on represented her country in Miss Supranational held in Nowy Sącz, Poland.

Kate identifies herself as a demisexual. She is currently modelling for Page 3 in the daily star and is a PADI advanced scuba diver

Awards and achievements
Preceded by Ella Baker Roberts	Miss Earth England; 2021	Succeeded by Beth Rice
