= Arti Cameron =

Guyanese model

- Born: December 14, 1988 (age 37); Georgetown, Guyana
- Citizenship: Guyana
- Education: LaGuardia Community College
- Occupation: Model
- Modeling information
- Height: 1.65 m (5 ft 5 in)

Arti Cameron (born December 14, 1988) is an Afro-Guyanese model and beauty pageant titleholder.

== Life and Career ==
She graduated from LaGuardia Community College in 2008. She was named Miss Guyana in 2011, but she was unable to obtain a visa in time to participate in the Miss World 2011 pageant, so her entry was deferred to the following year's international competition. She met with Bharrat Jagdeo, President of Guyana, after having won the national competition. At the Miss World 2012 pageant, Cameron won the People's Choice Award. It is traditional for beauty queens to be tall in order to better showcase their legs, but Cameron was one of several contestants at Miss World 2012 who were petite. The pageant was held in China and Cameron praised Chinese architecture while she was there. The Guyana Tri-State Alliance provided Cameron with three cocktail dresses for the competition. That July, Cameron appeared at the JRG Bikini Under the Bridge Fashion Show in New York City, New York, United States. Her reign as Miss Guyana lasted until 2013.
