= Silvana Vásquez =

- Born: Silvana Vásquez; Lima, Peru
- Height: 1.77 m (5 ft 9 1/2 in)
- Beauty pageant titleholder
- Title: Miss Ayacucho 2010; Miss Earth Peru 2010
- Hair color: Brown
- Eye color: Brown

Silvana Vásquez (born 1988) is a Peruvian model and beauty pageant titleholder who won the title Miss Earth Peru 2010 in the Miss International Peru 2010 pageant on April 24, 2010. Miss International Peru selects representatives for Miss Earth and Miss International pageants. Vásquez represented Peru in the Miss Earth 2010 pageant, held in Nha Trang, Vietnam.
