= Sandra Marie Lees =

- Born: Sandra Marie Lees; Birmingham, England
- Height: 5 ft 7 in (1.70 m)
- Beauty pageant titleholder
- Title: Miss Earth England 2010 (Winner); Miss Tourism Great Britain 2010 (Winner)
- Hair color: Brown
- Eye color: Brown

Sandra Marie Lees (born 1985) is an English model and beauty pageant titleholder who winner of several regional and national beauty pageants. She has represented the UK at the Miss International and Miss Tourism contests. As of September 11, 2010 she also holds the title of Miss Earth England and competed at the Miss Earth 2010.

== Professional career ==
=== Acting Background, Introduction to Modelling ===
Sandra Marie graduated from Birmingham Theatre School in 2006, hoping to forge a career in acting. She entered Miss Limo 2007, and after achieving a runner up spot, began to compete in pageants on a regular basis.

=== Charity Work ===
Sandra Marie has promoted and raised money for several charities during her career. These include Walk With Cancer in association with the Miss England pageant, and Help For Heroes for Miss Coventry.

== Pageant Achievements ==
Sandra Marie's introduction to beauty pageants came in 2007, challenging for the title of Miss Limo. She achieved a runner up position, an excellent result for a first competition, made all the more remarkable as she was initially entered by a friend as a practical joke. Her first pageant victory was the title of Miss West Midlands, a heat for the crown of Miss British Isles. In 2008 she began her reign as Miss Coventry and reached the semi-final stage of Miss England. This was followed by success at the Miss Keltruck contest, resulting in her featuring in the 2009 Keltruck calendar. Sandra's win in the Miss Beauty Queen Birmingham competition and subsequent victory at the national contest gave her the title Miss British International and a place in the world final in Chicago, her first appearance at an international pageant.

Sandra's most recent victory is the prestigious title of Miss Earth England, under which she will compete at Miss Earth 2010 in Nha Trang, Vietnam. The pageant is one of the three largest held internationally along with Miss World and Miss Universe.

== Pageant Results ==
Pageant	Year	Position
Miss Earth England	2010	Winner
Miss Earth Birmingham	2010	Winner
Miss Tourism Great Britain	2010	Winner
Miss British International	2009	Winner
Miss Beauty Queen UK	2009	Winner
Miss Beauty Queen Birmingham	2009	Winner
Miss Keltruck	2008/09	Winner
Miss Coventry	2008	Winner
Miss West Midlands	2007	Winner
