= Shakira Caine =

Guyanese-British former actress and fashion model (born 1947)

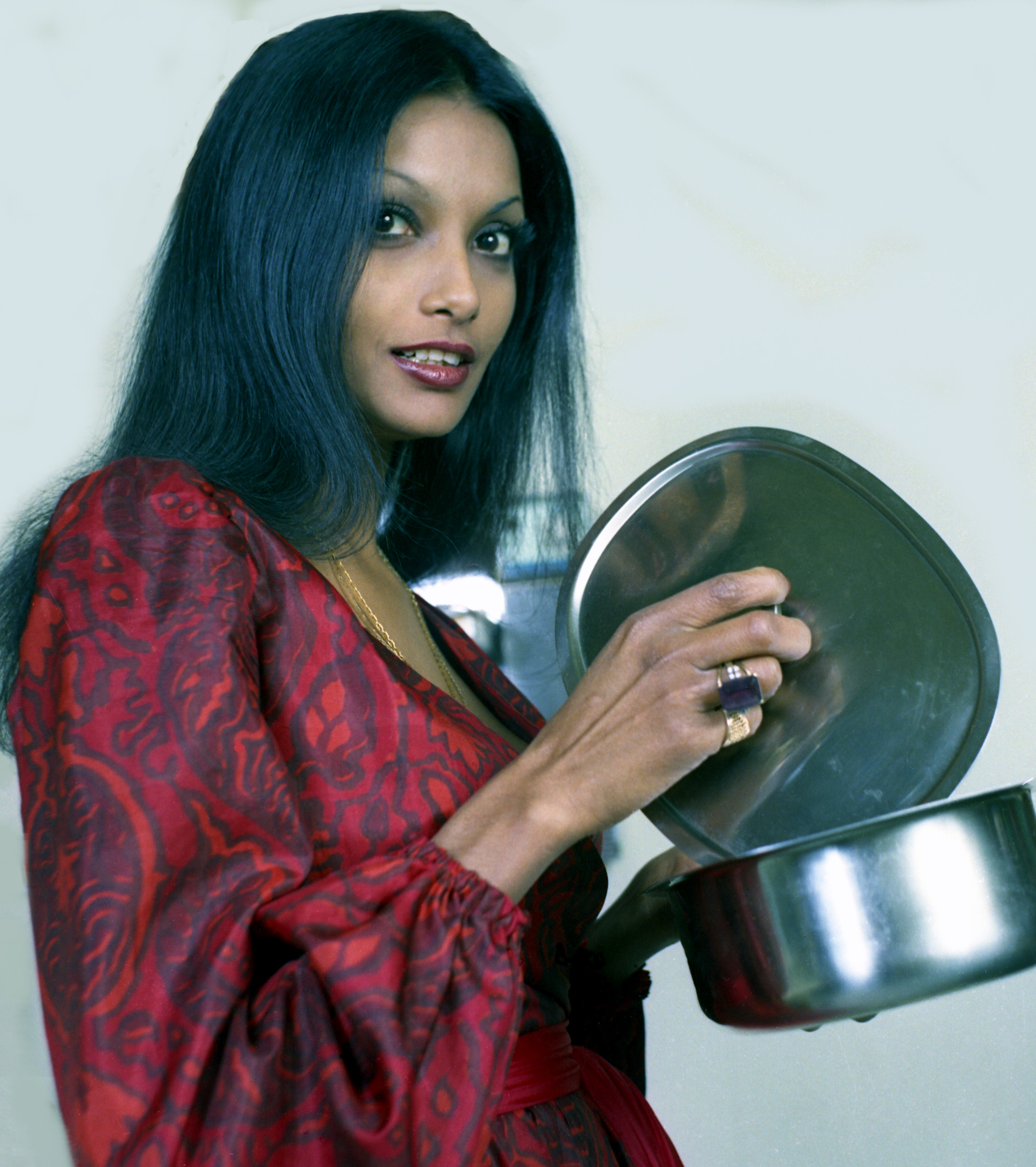
- Caine in 1974
- Born: Shakira Baksh; 23 February 1947 (age 79); St. Cuthbert's Mission, British Guiana (now Guyana)
- Other names: Lady Micklewhite, Shakira Micklewhite
- Occupations: Actress, model
- Years active: 1969–1975
- Spouse: Michael Caine (m. 1973)
- Children: 1
- Awards: Miss Guyana (1967)

Shakira, Lady Caine (née Baksh; born 23 February 1947) is a Guyanese-British former actress, fashion model and beauty pageant titleholder who competed at Miss World 1967, where she was second runner-up. She is married to English actor Michael Caine.

== Early life ==
Baksh was born on 23 February 1947 in British Guiana (present-day Guyana) to Muslim Indian parents. Her mother was a dressmaker, and she aspired to follow in her footsteps and become a fashion designer.

== Modelling and acting career ==
At the age of 19, while working as a secretary at the American embassy, she was urged by her employer to enter the 1967 Miss Guyana contest, which she won. She later earned third place in the 1967 Miss World contest held in London, where she decided to stay to launch a career in modelling.

Baksh appeared in several films, including Some Girls Do (1969), Carry On Again Doctor (1969), Toomorrow (1970), Son of Dracula (1974) and, with her husband, The Man Who Would Be King (1975). She also appeared in four episodes of the science fiction TV series UFO: "Identified", "E.S.P.", "The Responsibility Seat" and "The Dalotek Affair". She auditioned for the part of the Doctor Who companion Jo Grant, alongside third Doctor Jon Pertwee in June 1970.

== Personal life ==
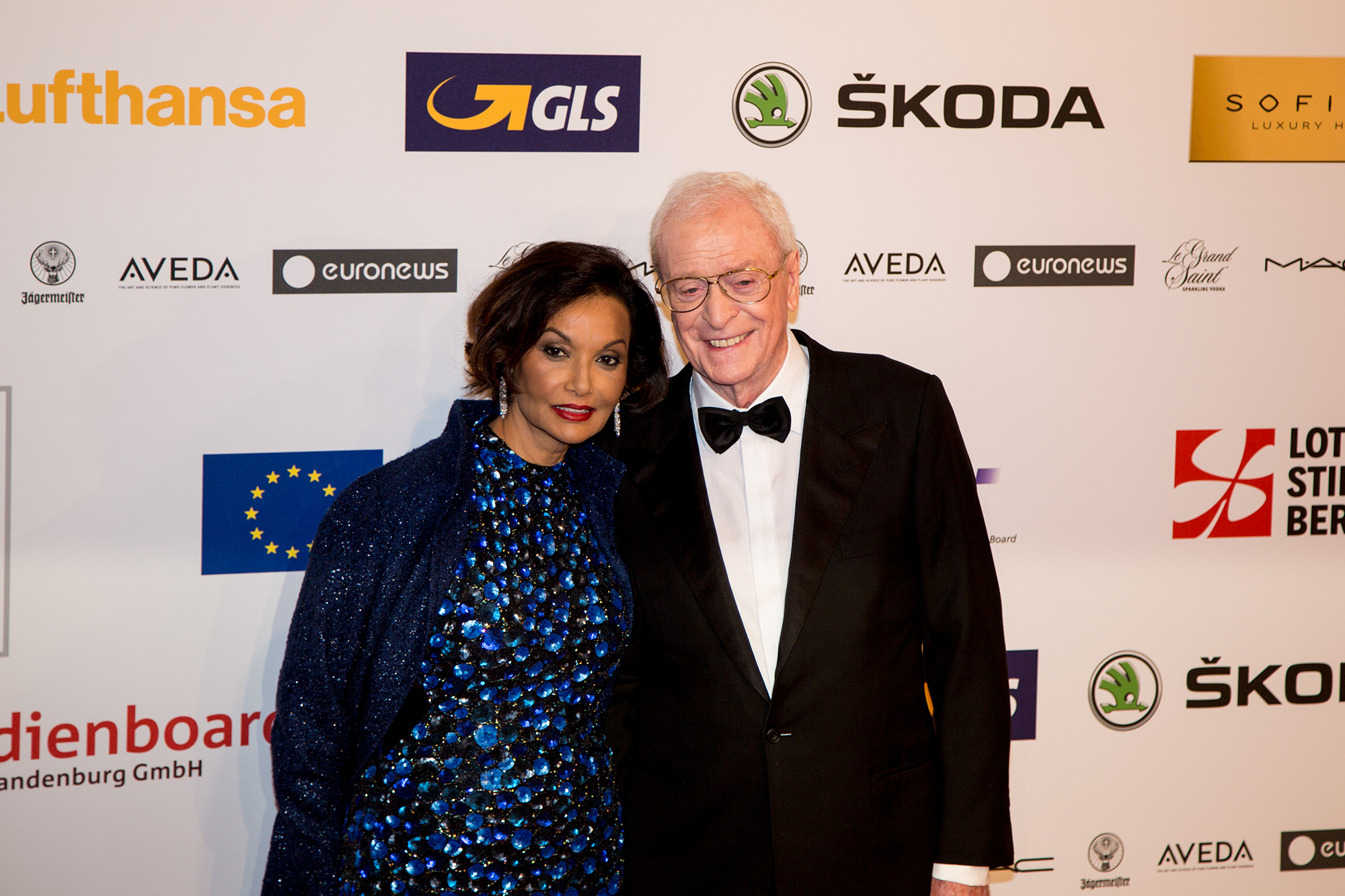
Baksh with her husband Michael Caine in 2015

After seeing Baksh on the BBC TV quiz show Where in the World and in a Brazilian television advertisement for Maxwell House coffee in 1971, Michael Caine became obsessed with finding the woman he considered to be "the most beautiful woman he had ever seen." From a friend in the advertising business, he discovered that she lived only a few miles from him in London. The couple were married at the Algiers Hotel in Winchester, Nevada on 8 January 1973, six months before their daughter Natasha was born.

Baksh is a Muslim, while her husband is a Christian. He reflected to The Guardian in 2009: "My wife is a Muslim and she does Muslim stuff; I'm a Christian and I do Christian stuff, and no questions ever come up. The media view of Muslims is different from mine, which is very benign and peaceful."

== Filmography ==
=== Film ===
Year	Title	Role	Director	Notes
1969	Some Girls Do	Exotic Robot Observer	Ralph Thomas	uncredited
1969	Carry On Again Doctor	Scrubba	Gerald Thomas	uncredited
1969	On Her Majesty's Secret Service	Extra in Casino	Peter R. Hunt	uncredited
1970	Toomorrow	Karl's friend	Val Guest	uncredited
1973	Son of Dracula	Housekeeper	Freddie Francis	credited as Shakira Baksh
1975	The Man Who Would Be King	Roxanne	John Huston	final film role

=== Television ===
Year	Title	Role	Notes
1970–1971	UFO	Joanna, SHADO Operative, Waitress	all roles uncredited
