= Ruqayyah Boyer =

Surinamese-Guyanese actress and musician

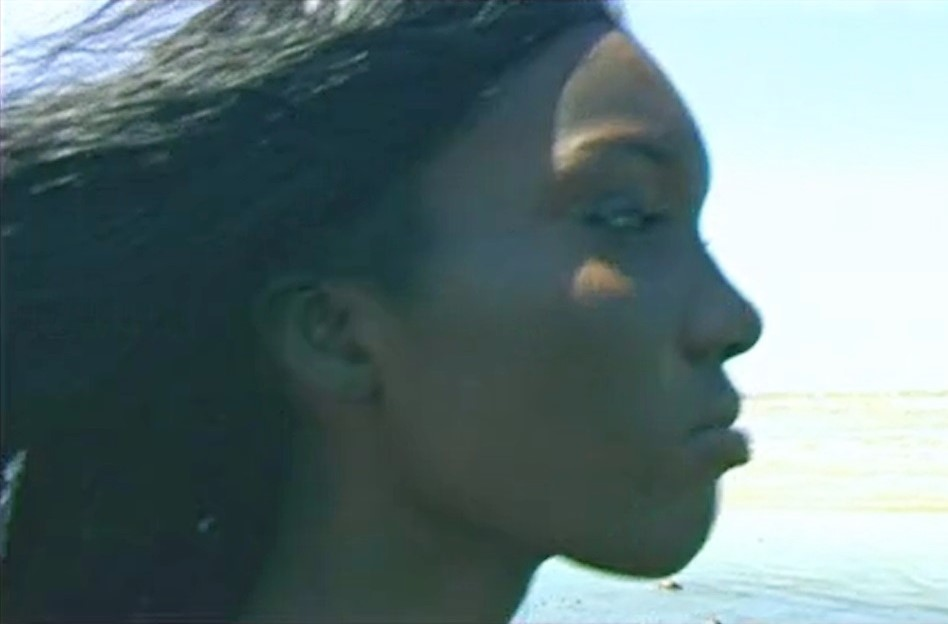
- Boyer in 2014
- Born: Ruqayyah Boyer; April 28, 1991 (age 35); Paramaribo, Suriname
- Beauty pageant titleholder
- Title: Miss Guyana 2012; Miss World Guyana 2013 (Winner)
- Hair color: Dark Brown
- Eye color: Brown
- Major competitions: Miss Guyana 2012 (Winner); Miss Universe 2012; Miss World Guyana 2013 (Winner); Miss World 2013 (Beach Fashion - Top 32); Miss International 2014

Ruqayyah Boyer (Arabic رقية born April 28, 1991) is a Surinamese-Guyanese actress, singer/songwriter, rapper and beauty pageant titleholder. She is also a graduate of the Institute of creative arts (Theatre arts, Drama and Music)

== Miss Universe Guyana 2012 ==
Boyer was crowned Miss Universe Guyana 2012 by Leila Lopes Miss Universe 2011.

First runner-up in the pageant was Nikita Barker, second runner-up was Canadian-Guyanese Sadhna Yunus, and third runner-up was Nikesha Alexander.

== Miss World Guyana 2013 ==
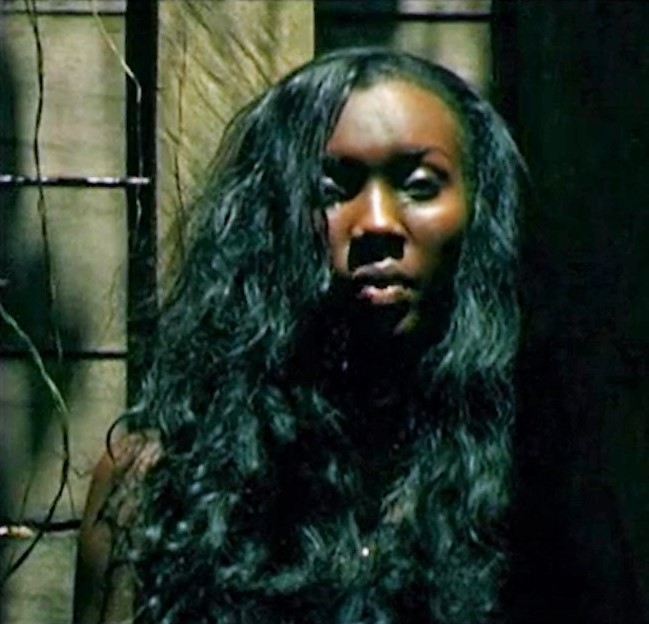
Boyer in 2014

Ruqayyah Boyer was chosen by the new franchise owner, Natasha Martindale as Miss Universe Guyana 2012 represented Guyana at Miss Universe 2012 in Las Vegas, Nevada and was a finalist in Miss World Guyana 2012.

Awards and achievements
Preceded by Kara Lord	Miss Guyana; 2012	Succeeded by Katherina Roshana
