= Miss Earth 2010 =

10th Miss Earth pageant

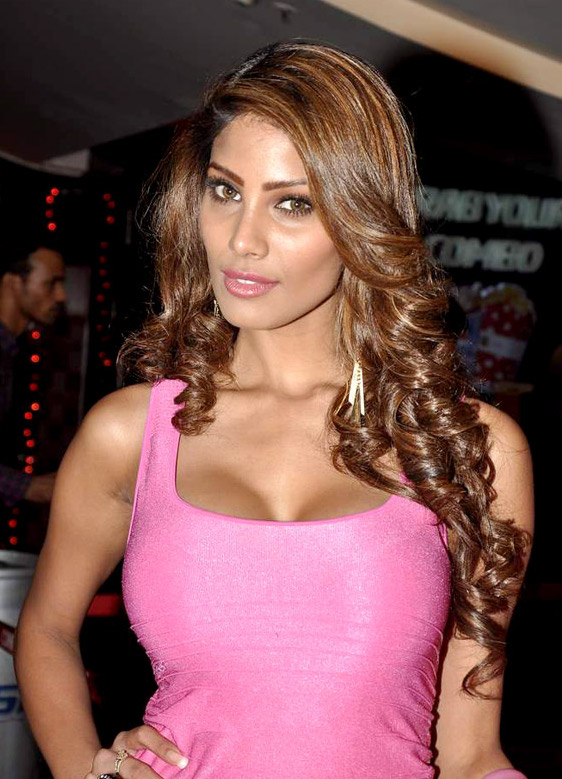
- Nicole Faria
- Date: 4 December 2010
- Presenters: Oli Pettigrew; Marie Digby; Jennifer Pham
- Entertainment: Ronan Keating; My Linh
- Venue: Vinpearl Land Amphitheater, Nha Trang, Vietnam
- Broadcaster: International: ABS-CBN; Studio 23; The Filipino Channel; Star World; Official broadcaster: VTV
- Entrants: 84
- Placements: 14
- Debuts: Crimea; Guyana; Madagascar
- Withdrawals: Albania; Argentina; Cuba; El Salvador; Gabon; Georgia; Greece; Honduras; Hungary; Israel; Pakistan; Paraguay; Spain; Sweden; Turks and Caicos Islands
- Returns: Bolivia; Bosnia and Herzegovina; Botswana; Cameroon; Cayman Islands; Chile; Curaçao; Egypt; Germany; Ireland; Mauritius; Mongolia; Nicaragua; Norway; Romania; Vietnam
- Winner: Nicole Faria; India
- Congeniality: Sue Ellen Castañeda, Guatemala
- Best National Costume: Marina Kishira, Japan
- Photogenic: Watsaporn Wattanakoon, Thailand

Miss Earth 2010 was the 10th edition of the Miss Earth pageant, held at the Vinpearl Land Amphitheater in Nha Trang, Vietnam, on December 4, 2010.

Larissa Ramos of Brazil crowned Nicole Faria of India as her successor at the end of the event. She was the first Miss Earth from India.

Eighty-four contestants from various countries and territories competed for the Miss Earth 2010 title. The event was broadcast live by STAR World, VTV, ABS-CBN, Studio 23, The Filipino Channel, and other partner networks.

The Miss Earth winner serves as the spokesperson for the Miss Earth Foundation, the United Nations Environment Programme (UNEP), and other environmental organizations.

The event was hosted by Oli Pettigrew, host of AXN's Sony Style program, along with Marie Digby and Jennifer Pham with Boyzone lead singer Ronan Keating as the guest performer. Vietnamese singer Mỹ Linh performed during the show.

== Results ==
Participating countries, territories and results

=== Placements ===
Placement	Contestant
Miss Earth 2010	India – Nicole Faria
Miss Earth – Air 2010	Ecuador – Jennifer Pazmiño (Dethroned)
Miss Earth – Air 2010	Russia – Victoria Shchukina (Assumed) ∞
Miss Earth – Water 2010	Thailand – Watsaporn Wattanakoon
Miss Earth – Fire 2010	Puerto Rico – Yeidy Bosques
Top 7	Japan – Marina Kishira; South Africa – Nondyebo Dzingwa; Venezuela – Mariángela Bonanni
Top 14	Czech Republic – Carmen Justová; Italy – Ilenia Arnolfo; Netherlands – Desiree van den Berg; Ukraine – Valentyna Zhytnyk; United States – Danielle Bounds; Vietnam – Lưu Thị Diễm Hương

Note:
∞ – Pazmiño resigned as Miss Earth Air 2010. Due to protocol, one of the finalists, Victoria Shchukina, assumed the Miss Earth Air title.
; Starting this year, there was no "runner-up" in Miss Earth. Instead the titles of Miss Air, Miss Water, and Miss Fire are bestowed on the next three contestants with highest scores after the Miss Earth winner. In this case, the titles went to Miss Ecuador, Jennifer Pazmiño, Miss Thailand, Watsaporn Wattanakoon and Miss Puerto Rico, Yeidy Bosques, respectively.

=== Special awards ===
==== Major awards ====
Awards	Contestant
Miss Friendship	Guatemala – Sue Ellen Castañeda
Miss Photogenic	Thailand – Watsaporn Wattanakoon
Miss Talent	India – Nicole Faria
Best in National Costume	Japan – Marina Kishira
Best in Evening Gown	Ecuador – Jennifer Pazmiño
Best in Swimsuit	Vietnam – Luu Thi Diem Huong

==== Talent competition ====
The talent competition took place in Ho Chi Minh City on 9 November 2010. Nicole Faria from India won the Miss Earth Talent 2010 after beating 17 other finalists. The event raised VND100 million, which was donated to the Ho Chi Minh City Red Cross, to support flood victims in the central region.

Result	Contestant
Winner	India – Nicole Faria
Top 5	Crimea – Anastasiya Sienina; Japan – Marina Kishira; Singapore – Maricelle Rani Wong; Vietnam – Lưu Thị Diễm Hương
Top 18	Bosnia and Herzegovina – Ema Golijanin; Botswana – Onalenna Gaopalelwe; Brazil – Luisa de Almeida Lopes; England – Sandra Marie Lees; Guam – Naiomie Jean Santos; Guatemala – Sue Ellen Castañeda; Guyana – Soyini Fraser; Ireland – Alesha Gallen; Italy – Ilenia Arnolfo; Jamaica – Kai Ayanna McDonald; South Africa – Nondyebo Dzingwa; Thailand – Watsaporn Wattanakoon; Tonga – Glena Lavemai

Note: At that night, Miss Vietnam won a sponsor award which is Miss Vietnam Airlines while Miss India won Miss Diamond Place.

==== Best in National Costume ====
The National Costume competition took place at the Sea-Links Resort in Phan Thiết on 13 November 2010. Marina Kishira, from Japan, won the Best in National Costume at Miss Earth 2010 after beating other contestants.

Result	Contestant
Winner	Japan – Marina Kishira
Top 5	Brazil – Luisa de Almeida Lopes; Ecuador – Jennifer Pazmiño; Mexico – Claudia Lopez Mollinedo; South Africa – Nondyebo Dzingwa

Note: At that night, Miss Japan also won a sponsor award which is Miss Earth Sea-Links City Resort.

==== Miss Aodai ====
The Miss Aodai was held on 17 November 2010 in Nha Trang, Khanh Hoa.

Result	Contestant
Winner	Serbia – Tijana Rakic
Top 5	Nicaragua – Junieth Rosales; Philippines – Psyche Resus; South Korea – Gui-joo Lee; (Chinese Taipei) Taiwan – Liu Hsing-Jung

Note: At that night, Miss Serbia also won a sponsor award which is Miss Saigon Elegance.

==== Best in Evening Gown ====
The Best in Evening Gown was held on 17 November 2010 in Nha Trang, Khánh Hòa.

Result	Contestant
Winner	Ecuador – Jennifer Pazmiño
Top 5	Brazil – Luisa de Almeida Lopes; Czech Republic – Carmen Justová; Thailand – Watsaporn Wattanakoon; Venezuela – Mariángela Bonanni

Note: At that night, Miss Ecuador also won a sponsor award which is Miss PNJ.

==== Best in Swimsuit ====
The Best in Swimsuit was held on 20 November 2010 in Phu Yen. Miss Vietnam Lưu Thị Diễm Hương won the Best in Swimsuit.

Result	Contestant
Winner	Vietnam – Luu Thi Diem Huong
Top 5	Brazil – Luisa de Almeida Lopes; Ecuador – Jennifer Pazmiño; Norway – Iman Kerigo; Venezuela – Mariangela Bonanni

Note: At that night, Miss Vietnam won a sponsor award which is Miss CanDeluxe.

== Winning answer ==
For the 10th anniversary of the contest, Top 7 will meet the questions of conduct from the previous year's competitions. Miss Earth 2010 drew a question in the behavioral contest of Miss Earth 2002: "For you, what is more important: sunrise or sunset?"

Answer of Miss Earth 2010:

I will obviously choose sunrise because whenever we see the sunrise, people will think about a new day filled with energy. A new day offers 24 valuable hours to do good things for ourselves and other people." – Nicole Faria, represented India.

== Contestants ==
Country/Terr.	Contestant	Age	Height	Hometown
Australia	Kelly Louise Maguire	24	1.78 m (5 ft 10 in)	Sydney
Bahamas	Aquelle Plakaris	24	1.78 m (5 ft 10 in)	Nassau
Belgium	Melissa Vingerhoed	18	1.70 m (5 ft 7 in)	Etterbeek
Bolivia	Yovana O'Brien	19	1.80 m (5 ft 11 in)	Santa Cruz
Bosnia and Herzegovina	Ema Golijanin	18	1.77 m (5 ft 9 1/2 in)	Sarajevo
Botswana	Onalenna Gaopalelwe	20	1.73 m (5 ft 8 in)	Serowe
Brazil	Luisa de Almeida Lopes	20	1.75 m (5 ft 9 in)	Porto de Galinhas
Cameroon	Estelle Essame	26	1.71 m (5 ft 7 1/2 in)	Yaoundé
Canada	Summer Anne Ross	26	1.80 m (5 ft 11 in)	Toronto
Cayman Islands	Samantha Widmer	19	1.75 m (5 ft 9 in)	George Town
Chile	Pamela Soprani	23	1.78 m (5 ft 10 in)	Santiago
China	Zhao Shenqianhui	19	1.77 m (5 ft 9 1/2 in)	Beijing
Colombia	Diana Marin	22	1.80 m (5 ft 11 in)	Cali
Costa Rica	Allyson Alfaro	20	1.72 m (5 ft 7 1/2 in)	San José
Crimea	Anastasiya Sienina	19	1.79 m (5 ft 10 1/2 in)	Simferopol
Curaçao	Norayla Francisco	25	1.81 m (5 ft 11 1/2 in)	Willemstad
Czech Republic	Carmen Justová	19	1.76 m (5 ft 9 1/2 in)	Sokolov
Denmark	Sandra Vester	25	1.66 m (5 ft 5 1/2 in)	Copenhagen
Dominican Republic	Wisleidy Osorio	21	1.78 m (5 ft 10 in)	Samana
Ecuador	Jennifer Pazmiño	22	1.80 m (5 ft 11 in)	Guayaquil
Egypt	Doaa Hakam	22	1.69 m (5 ft 6 1/2 in)	Cairo
England	Sandra Marie Lees	25	1.70 m (5 ft 7 in)	Birmingham
France	Fanny Vauzanges	25	1.74 m (5 ft 8 1/2 in)	Paris
French Polynesia	Mihiatea Ruta	24	1.75 m (5 ft 9 in)	Papeete
Germany	Reingard Hageman	25	1.76 m (5 ft 9 1/2 in)	Schwerin
Ghana	Golda Dayi	18	1.83 m (6 ft 0 in)	Accra
Guadeloupe	Maïté Elso	23	1.71 m (5 ft 7 1/2 in)	Les Abymes
Guam	Naiomie Jean Santos	18	1.75 m (5 ft 9 in)	Asan
Guatemala	Sue Ellen Castañeda	24	1.72 m (5 ft 7 1/2 in)	Guatemala City
Guyana	Soyini Fraser	20	1.80 m (5 ft 11 in)	Georgetown
Hong Kong	Zheng Xiaoyue	19	1.77 m (5 ft 9 1/2 in)	Hong Kong
India	Nicole Faria	20	1.75 m (5 ft 9 in)	Bengaluru
Indonesia	Jessica Aurelia Tji	24	1.73 m (5 ft 8 in)	Jakarta
Ireland	Alesha Gallen	24	1.75 m (5 ft 9 in)	Donegal
Italy	Ilenia Arnolfo	26	1.81 m (5 ft 11 1/2 in)	Cuneo
Jamaica	Kai Ayanna McDonald	24	1.72 m (5 ft 7 1/2 in)	Kingston
Japan	Marina Kishira	23	1.73 m (5 ft 8 in)	Chiba
Kenya	Miano Isabell Wangui	22	1.74 m (5 ft 8 1/2 in)	Njoro
Kosovo	Morena Taraku	18	1.74 m (5 ft 8 1/2 in)	Peje
Latvia	Eva Caune	22	1.68 m (5 ft 6 in)	Riga
Lebanon	Jihane Nehme	26	1.74 m (5 ft 8 1/2 in)	Beirut
Luxembourg	Laureta Bardoniqi	18	1.68 m (5 ft 6 in)	Bettembourg
Macau	Yi Tong Sun	23	1.66 m (5 ft 5 1/2 in)	Macau
Madagascar	Alexandra Randrianarivel	23	1.73 m (5 ft 8 in)	Antananarivo
Malaysia	Appey Rowena Januin	18	1.70 m (5 ft 7 in)	Kota Kinabalu
Malta	Christine Mifsud	19	1.76 m (5 ft 9 1/2 in)	Valletta
Martinique	Christine Garçon	22	1.78 m (5 ft 10 in)	Le Vauclin
Mauritius	Anne-Lise Ramooloo	21	1.74 m (5 ft 8 1/2 in)	Port Louis
Mexico	Claudia Lopez Mollinedo	18	1.72 m (5 ft 7 1/2 in)	Teapa
Mongolia	Bayaarkhuu Gantogoo	24	1.75 m (5 ft 9 in)	Ömnögovi
Nepal	Sahana Bajracharya	21	1.72 m (5 ft 8 in)	Kathmandu
Netherlands	Desirée van den Berg	23	1.76 m (5 ft 9 1/2 in)	Santpoort
New Zealand	Lisa Davids	20	1.65 m (5 ft 5 in)	North Shore
Nicaragua	Junieth Raquel Rosales	21	1.76 m (5 ft 9 1/2 in)	Managua
Nigeria	Inara Isaiah	18	1.86 m (6 ft 1 in)	Bayelsa
Northern Ireland	Judith Keys	18	1.68 m (5 ft 6 in)	Belfast
Norway	Iman Kerigo	18	1.68 m (5 ft 6 in)	Kløfta
Panama	Nicole Morrell	20	1.76 m (5 ft 9 1/2 in)	Panama City
Peru	Silvana Vásquez	22	1.74 m (5 ft 8 1/2 in)	Lima
Philippines	Psyche Resus	22	1.68 m (5 ft 6 in)	Infanta
Poland	Beata Polakowska	24	1.72 m (5 ft 7 1/2 in)	Ostrów Mazowiecka
Puerto Rico	Yeidy Bosques	22	1.80 m (5 ft 11 in)	Mayagüez
Romania	Andreea Capsuc	19	1.71 m (5 ft 7 1/2 in)	Bucharest
Russia	Viktoria Shchukina	22	1.76 m (5 ft 9 1/2 in)	Moscow
Samoa	Faaselega Oloapu	25	1.80 m (5 ft 11 in)	Apia
Scotland	Cora Buchanan	24	1.71 m (5 ft 7 1/2 in)	Edinburgh
Serbia	Tijana Rakic	23	1.75 m (5 ft 9 in)	Kruševac
Singapore	Maricelle Rani Wong	20	1.66 m (5 ft 5 1/2 in)	Singapore
Slovak Republic	Tímea Szaboová	20	1.83 m (6 ft 0 in)	Bratislava
Slovenia	Ines Draganovič	19	1.74 m (5 ft 8 1/2 in)	Ljubljana
South Africa	Nondyebo Dzingwa	24	1.75 m (5 ft 9 in)	Roodepoort
South Korea	Gui-joo Lee	20	1.74 m (5 ft 8 1/2 in)	Jeollabuk-do
South Sudan	Atong Demach	22	1.80 m (5 ft 11 in)	Juba
Switzerland	Liza Andrea Küster	24	1.68 m (5 ft 6 in)	Bern
(Chinese Taipei) Taiwan	Liu Hsing-Jung	25	1.70 m (5 ft 7 in)	Taipei
Tanzania	Rose Shayo	21	1.82 m (5 ft 11 1/2 in)	Dodoma
Thailand	Watsaporn Wattanakoon	23	1.70 m (5 ft 7 in)	Chiang Rai
Tonga	Glena Lavemai	19	1.79 m (5 ft 10 1/2 in)	Nukualofa
Turkey	Döndü Şahin	24	1.83 m (6 ft 0 in)	Nuremberg
Ukraine	Valentina Zhytnyk	18	1.79 m (5 ft 10 1/2 in)	Kharkiv
United States	Danielle Bounds	25	1.83 m (6 ft 0 in)	Kansas City
Venezuela	Mariángela Bonanni	22	1.77 m (5 ft 9 1/2 in)	San Cristóbal
Vietnam	Lưu Thị Diễm Hương	20	1.71 m (5 ft 7 1/2 in)	Ho Chi Minh City
Wales	Louise Hinder	19	1.77 m (5 ft 9 1/2 in)	Swansea

== Judges ==
No.	Judge	Background
1	Ella Bella	Founder of Generation Earth
2	Nenad Bratic	Architecture
3	Marie J.Y.E. Collart	Hollywood Actress
4	Rachel Grant	Hollywood Actress
5	Karla Henry	Miss Earth 2008 from Philippines
6	Michael Jeffrey Rosenthal	Fashion Photographer
7	Eddy Tan	President of STAR World
8	Chau Sanh Pham	Head of the Culture, External Relations and UNESCO under the Ministry of Foreign Affairs of Vietna
9	Thanh Dai Hoang	Editor-in-chief of Thoi Trang Tre Magazine
10	Nhu Quynh Nguyen	Fashion Designer

== Schedules ==
Miss Earth 2010 was held in Vietnam. The announcement was made in a ceremony at the Legend Saigon Hotel in Ho Chi Minh City, Vietnam on 28 January 2010.

The delegates from various countries arrived in Vietnam on 4 November 2010 and participated in a range of activities covering Ho Chi Minh City, Phan Thiet, Hoi An, and Nha Trang. The delegates attended a press conference and various environmental activities in Ho Chi Minh City from 4–13 November. The delegates travelled to Phan Thiet and joined environmental activities and a festival to advertise Vietnam's sports from 15 to 17 November. In the ancient town of Hoi An, they competed in Miss Ao Dai, attended the Earth Hour and the Lantern Festival, to call for fuel saving and natural resource protection from 17 to 19 November. The delegates went back to Nha Trang for charity works, cycling, street cleaning, met with the local residents to talk about environmental protection and participate in various environmental activities, and prepared for the finale night.

- In Ho Chi Minh City: ( 7–11 November)
  - 7 Nov.: 28 The delegates officially started the activities in Vietnam as the first medication dispensing charity, and also visited Saigon river, and then the Aodai fashion fitting.
  - 8 Nov.: Meet and Greet with the organizers, the delegates also visited the Da Phuoc Waste treatment – Binh Chanh and Trung Nguyen coffee.
  - 9 Nov.: Miss Talent Competition
  - 10 Nov.: Press Presentation – the delegates attended the first official press conference at the White Palace (City) and participated in charity, gifts auction to raise funds for charity.
  - 11 Nov.: At 6 pm, Gala Dinner which was broadcast live on VTV3 and HTV7 (Ho Chi Minh City Television).
- In Central Vietnam: (12 November – 4 December)
  - 12 Nov.: Provincial tour at Phan Thiet (Binh Thuan) The delegates engaged in environmental protection; attended the Golf Business Review; evening welcome party for the candidates.
  - 13 Nov.: National Costume Competition – At 9 am, 84 contestants rehearsed for the national costumes competition and competed on the same day at 6.30 pm, and then the delegates listened to the public address through the Image Beauty, Beauty and auction Friendly items.
  - 17 Nov.: Miss Aodai and Best in Evening Gown were held in Nha Trang, Khanh Hoa.
  - 20 Nov.: Best in Swimsuit was held in Phu Yen.
  - 4 Dec.: Final night – At 8pm (GMT +7), Miss Earth 2010 final night was held in Vinpearl, Nha Trang. Broadcast live on VTV1 and VTV4, ABS-CBN, The Filipino Channel (Philippines), STAR World.

== Notes ==
=== Debuts ===
- Crimea
- Guyana
- Madagascar

=== Returns ===
- Last competed in 2005:
  - Mauritius
  - Mongolia
- Last competed in 2006:
  - Cayman Islands
  - Chile
  - Curaçao
  - Egypt
  - Ireland
- Last competed in 2007:
  - Cameroon
  - Norway
  - Vietnam
- Last competed in 2008:
  - Bolivia
  - Bosnia and Herzegovina
  - Botswana
  - Germany
  - Nicaragua
  - Romania

=== Replacements ===
- Belgium – Jessica Van Moorleghem was replaced by Melissa Vingerhoed for personal reasons.
- Brazil – Aline Bruch was replaced by Luisa de Almeida Lopes.
- China – Ding Wenyuan was replaced by Zhao Shenqianhui.
- Costa Rica – Alejandra Alvarez was replaced by Allyson Alfaro.
- France – Christelle Demaison was replaced by Fanny Vauzanges due to family emergency.
- Germany – Anna Julia Hagen was replaced by Reingard Hagemann because of her studies.
- Indonesia – Liza Elly Purnamasari was replaced by Jessica Aurelia Tji.
- Romania – Andreea Dorobantiu was replaced by Andreea Capsuc.
- Ukraine – Okelsandra Nikitina was replaced by Valentina Zhytnyk.

=== Designations ===
- Crimea – Anastasiya Sienina was appointed to represent the autonomous territory. She was the 2nd Runner-up of Miss Ukraine 2010.
- Serbia – Tijana Rakić was appointed to represent Serbia. She entered Top 5 Miss Serbia 2010.
- Venezuela – Mariángela Bonanni was appointed as Miss Earth Venezuela 2009 by Osmel Sousa, the president of Miss Venezuela Organization after the organization took over the franchise from Sambil Model Venezuela Organization. She was the 1st Runner-up of Miss Venezuela 2009.
- Vietnam – Lưu Thị Diễm Hương was appointed to represent Vietnam this year. She was Miss Vietnam World 2010.

=== Did not compete ===
- Argentina – Isolina Boero
- Bhutan – Kinley Yangden
- El Salvador – Sarai Calderón
- Georgia – Taliko Shubitidze
- Sri Lanka – Dilrufa Mohamed
- Uganda – Pierra Akewro

=== Withdrawals ===
- Albania
- Cuba
- Gabon – No national pageant held
- Greece
- Honduras
- Hungary – Original contestant Jennifer Kalo ended up competing at Miss World 2010 due to Agnes Dobo injury.
- Israel
- Pakistan
- Paraguay
- Spain
- Sweden – Lack of funding and sponsorship
- Turks and Caicos Islands – No national pageant held; lack of funding and sponsorship
