= Miss Guyana =

Beauty pageant

Guyana's Miss World
- Formation: 1966
- Type: Beauty pageant
- Headquarters: Georgetown
- Location: Guyana
- Members: Miss World; Miss Supranational
- Official language: English
- License Holder: Natasha Martindale

Miss Guyana is the national Beauty pageant in Guyana where the Titleholder/National Winner represents Guyana at the Miss World competition. Guyana first placed at the Miss World competition in 1966 which was the first of six consecutive placements from semifinalist to top 3 finish from 1966 to 1971.[3] The Miss Guyana trademark is under Natasha Martindale directorship.

== History ==
=== Miss Guyana ===
Since 1966 Miss Guyana was known as the Independent Queen whose winners represented Guyana at the Miss World contest. The first Miss Guyana was Umblita Van Sluytman from Georgetown. She became Guyana's first representative at the Miss World competition in London, in November 1966. A UPI photograph of her dancing on a table in her navel-baring, minimal costume for the pageant was published in many newspapers. She placed as a semifinalist.

==== Seasons ====
- 1967: Shakira Baksh, the 1967 Miss Guyana, went on to become a runner-up at the Miss World 1967 pageant. Baksh married British actor Michael Caine six years later, becoming his second wife.
- 2009: Imarah Radix was named Miss Guyana World in 2009 and went on to compete at the Miss World 2009 pageant in South Africa.
- 2010: Aletha Shepherd, who was Miss Guyana World 2010, went on to compete in the Miss Asia Pacific World pageant the following year, from which she withdrew after allegedly being sexually harassed by the pageant's sponsors and racially discriminated against by the judges.
- 2012: Arti Cameron, a pre-medical student, was crowned Miss Guyana World. That July, Cameron appeared at the JRG Bikini Under the Bridge Fashion Show in New York City, New York, United States. It is traditional for beauty queens to be tall in order to better showcase their legs, but Cameron was one of several contestants at Miss World 2012 who were petite.
- 2013: Natasha Martindale took over the leadership of the Miss Guyana World pageant, replacing Ken Chung who had previously filled that role.
- 2014: Rafieya Husain was crowned Miss World Guyana 2014 on May 26, 2014. The 22-year-old scooped the top prize at the event held at the National Cultural Centre. Speaking after collecting her prize, Rafieya promised to work with various organisations to fight the scourge of domestic violence, by tackling it from the grassroot level. In addition, she is optimistic that she has what it takes to bring home the Miss World crown later in the year. The 1st runner up was Atisha Gaskill, with Denicia Williams 2nd runner up.

=== Miss World Guyana ===
Color key

- Declared as Winner
- Ended as runner-up
- Ended as one of the finalists or semifinalists

| Year | Titleholders | Miss World Guyana | Placement | Special Awards |
|---|---|---|---|---|
| 1966 | | Umblita Van Sluytman | Top 15 | |
| 1967 | | Shakira Caine | 2nd Runner-up | |
| 1968 | | Adrienne Harris | Top 7 | |
| 1969 | | Pamela Patricia Lord | 3rd Runner-up | |
| 1970 | | Jennifer Diana Evan Wong | Top 10 | |
| 1971 | | Nalini Moonsar | 3rd Runner-up | |
| 1988 | | Christina Jardim | Unplaced | |
| 1989 | | Reeya Majeed | Unplaced | |
| 1999 | | Indra Changa | Unplaced | |
| 2001 | | Olive Gopaul | Unplaced | |
| 2002 | | Odessa Abenaa Phillips | Unplaced | |
| 2003 | | Alexis Glasgow | Unplaced | |
| 2004 | | Suzette Marissa Shim | Unplaced | |
| 2005 | | Jasmine Samoy Herzog | Unplaced | |
| 2006 | | Dessia Braithwaite | Unplaced | |
| 2007 | | Candace Charles | Unplaced | |
| 2008 | | Christa Lasaunta Simmons | Unplaced | |
| 2009 | | Kalerouann Radix | Unplaced | Miss World Talent (Top 22) |
| 2010 | | Aletha Shepherd | Unplaced | Miss World Sports (Semifinalist) |
| 2012 | | Arti Cameron | Unplaced | Miss World Sports (Finalist) |
| 2013 | | Ruqayyah Boyer | Unplaced | Miss World Beach Beauty (Semifinalist); Miss World Talent (Quarterfinalist) |
| 2014 | | Rafieya Husain | Top 10 | Beauty With a Purpose; Continental Queen of Caribbean |
| 2015 | Miss World Guyana 2015 | Lisa Punch | Top 10 | Miss World Talent; Multimedia Awards (Top 5); Beauty With a Purpose (Top 10) |
| 2016 | | Nuriyyih Gerrard | Unplaced | Beauty with a Purpose Certificate (Quarterfinalist) |
| 2017 | | Vena Mookram | Unplaced | |
| 2018 | | Ambika Ramraj | Unplaced | Miss World Talent (Finalist); Beauty with a Purpose (Semifinalist) |
| 2019 | | Joylyn Conway | Top 40 | |
| 2020 | Due to the impact of COVID-19 pandemic, no pageant in 2020—2022 | | | |
| 2023 | | Andrea King | Unplaced | |
| 2025 | | Zalika Samuels | Unplaced | |
| 2026 | | Kelcia Nelson | Unplaced | |

=== Miss Supranational Guyana ===
- : Declared as Winner
- : Ended as runner-up or top 5/6 qualification
- : Ended as one of the finalists or semifinalists
- : Ended as special awards winner

| Year | Miss Supranational Guyana | Placement at Miss Supranational | Special Awards |
|---|---|---|---|
| 2021 | Felicia Ally | Unplaced | |
| 2016 | Jaleesa Mar-Chell Peterkin | Unplaced | |
