= Umblita Van Sluytman =

Guyanese beauty queen (1946–2004)

Umblita Van Sluytman (August 13, 1946 – July 30, 2004) was a Guyanese beauty pageant titleholder who was crowned Miss Guyana 1966, the first Miss Guyana to compete internationally at the Miss World and Miss Universe pageants.

== Early life ==
Umblita Claire Van Sluytman was born in British Guiana (now Guyana), with Indian, Portuguese, and Dutch ancestry.

== Career ==
Umblita Van Sluytman was crowned Miss Guyana 1966 at age 19. She competed at the Miss Universe pageant in summer 1966, in Miami Beach, Florida. That year was the first when competitors were accommodated in non-segregated housing. She became Guyana's first representative at the Miss World competition in London, in November 1966. She reached the semi-finals, and was the first of six consecutive Miss Guyanas to finish in the top ten at the event from 1966 to 1971. A UPI photograph of her dancing on a table in her navel-baring, minimal costume for the pageant was published in many newspapers.

== Personal life ==
Umblita Van Sluytman married William James Butters; they had a son, Damon Butters. She died in 2004, in Las Vegas, Nevada, aged 57 years.
