= Miss World Iceland =

Beauty pageant

- Formation: 1950; 76 years ago
- Type: Beauty pageant
- Headquarters: Reykjavík
- Location: Iceland
- Members: Miss World
- Official language: Icelandic
- License Holder: Linda Pétursdóttir

Miss World Iceland (originally Miss Iceland; Icelandic: Ungfrú Ísland), is a national beauty pageant in Iceland. The winner of this contest represents Iceland at Miss World.

== History ==
The competition has been carried out since 1950; in the first year it was called Miss Reykjavík (Ungfrú Reykjavík). Since 1955, the contest has taken place under the current name Miss Iceland. In the past, contest winners gained the right to represent Iceland in Miss Universe, Miss World or Miss International. As of 2009, the winner goes on to compete in Miss World. There are six regional preliminary contests in each of the five rural regions and in the capital Reykjavík. 20 to 24 candidates, three to four from each region, take part in the finals.

Iceland is one of the most successful countries at the Miss World pageant with three victories, a record for a nation with a population of less than half a million people.

In 2018, the organizers abandoned the Ungfrú Ísland (Miss Iceland) brand in order to adopt a new format for Miss World and created Miss World Iceland.

In 2019, former Miss World of 1988, Linda Pétursdóttir, became the license holder for Miss World Iceland and is now in charge of organizing the contest.

=== 2013 applicants ===
Rafn Rafnsson, the new chief executive of the Miss Iceland contest, "in hopes of diversifying the field of contestants beyond the statuesque blonde with striking blue eyes that has become the Icelandic stereotype", said "There is no Miss Iceland stereotype..." One week later, in response to Rafnsson's statement, 1,300 people applied to become Miss Iceland, including several nontraditional candidates, such as:

- Sigríður Guðmarsdóttir, 48, a female governmental minister in Reykjavik
- Reynir Sigurðbjörnsson, 47, a male electrician
- Ása Richardsdóttir, a 49-year-old female producer in the fine arts industry
- Matthildur Helgadóttir-Jónudóttir, a female event manager also in her 40s
- Brynhildur Heiðardóttir Ómarsdóttir, a female literary critic
- Sigríður Ingibjörg Ingadóttir, a female Member of Parliament for the Social Democratic Alliance
- Guðrún Jónsdóttir, a spokesperson for Stígamót (organization that fights sexual abuse against women)
- Hildur Lillendahl, a feminist in Iceland
- Björk Vilhelmsdóttir, a city councilor of Reykjavík and feminist
- Þórdís Elva Þorvaldsdóttir, a writer and actress

In response to the increase of nontraditional applicants, Rafnsson said, "We have to follow the rules set by the international contest." This "means rejecting any applicants younger than 18 or older than 24. In addition to the age limits, contestants must be unmarried, childless and, of course, female." Íris Telma Jonsdóttir, Iceland's 2012 Miss World contestant, "has the unfortunate job of sifting through applications for the coming Miss Iceland contest and the publicity stirred by feminists has even sparked an abnormally high influx of legitimate hopefuls. That means she has a lot more reading to do before selecting the field of 25 women who will actually compete for a chance to move on to Miss World."

== Titleholders ==
=== 2018-2021 ===
Winning International Title

Year	Miss World Iceland	Municipality
2018	Erla Ólafsdóttir	Reykjavík
2019	Kolfinna Mist Austfjörð	Reykjavík
2021	Hugrún Birta Egilsdóttir	Reykjavík

== Miss Iceland for Miss World ==
=== 2018-2021 ===
- : Declared as Winner
- : Ended as runner-up or top 5/6 qualification
- : Ended as one of the finalists or semifinalists
- : Ended as special awards winner

Beginning in 2018, the winner of Miss World Iceland of will compete for Miss World.

Year	Municipality	Miss World Iceland	Placement at Miss World	Special Awards	Notes
2021	Reykjavík	Hugrún Birta Egilsdóttir	Top 40	1st Runner-Up in Miss World Sports 2021	
2020	No contest in 2020 due to the COVID-19 pandemic.				
2019	Reykjavík	Kolfinna Mist Austfjörð	Unplaced	Top 27 in Miss World Talent 2019	Miss World Iceland – Linda Pétursdóttir directorship
2018	Reykjavík	Erla Ólafsdóttir	Unplaced		Appointed Miss World Iceland by the then national director for the pageant, Björn Leifsson; Miss World Iceland – Björn Leifsson directorship

=== Ungfrú Ísland 1955-2017 ===
- : Declared as Winner
- : Ended as runner-up or top 5/6 qualification
- : Ended as one of the finalists or semifinalists
- : Ended as special awards winner

Ungfrú Ísland winners between 1955 and 2017 competed at Miss World pageant.

Year	Municipality	Ungfrú Ísland	Placement at Miss World	Special Awards	Notes
2017	Reykjavík	Ólafía Ósk Finnsdóttir	Unplaced		
2016	Reykjavík	Anna Orlowska	Unplaced		
2015	Kópavogur	Arna Ýr Jónsdóttir	Unplaced	Top 30 in Miss World Talent 2015	Later won Miss Universe Iceland 2017.
2014	Hafnarfjörður	Tanja Ýr Ástþórsdóttir	Unplaced		
2013	Reykjavík	Sigríður Dagbjört Ásgeirsdóttir	Unplaced		
2012	Reykjavík	Íris Telma Jónsdóttir	Unplaced		
2011	Akranes	Sigrún Eva Ármannsdóttir	Unplaced		
2010	Garðabær	Fanney Ingvarsdóttir	Unplaced		
2009		Guðrún Dögg Rúnarsdóttir	Unplaced		
2008	Reykjavík	Alexandra Ívarsdóttir	Top 15		
2007	Reykjavík	Jóhanna Vala Jónsdóttir	Unplaced		
2006	Ísafjarðarbær	Ásdís Hallgrímsdóttir	Unplaced		
2005	Seltjarnarnes	Unnur Birna Vilhjálmsdóttir	Miss World 2005	Miss World Northern Europe	
2004	Árborg	Hugrún Harðardóttir	Unplaced		
2003	Reykjavík	Regína Jónsdóttir	Unplaced		
2002		Eyrun Steinsson	Pulled out of the pageant due to the Amina Lawal incident in Nigeria.		
2001		Kolbrún Pálina Helgadóttir	Unplaced		
2000		Elva Dögg Melsted	Unplaced		
1999		Katrín Baldursdóttir	Unplaced		
Did not compete between 1995—1998
1994	Álftanes	Birna Bragadóttir	Unplaced		
1993	Reykjavík	Guðrún Rut Hreiðarsdóttir	Unplaced		
1992	Reykjavík	María Rún Hafliðadóttir	Unplaced		
1991	Reykjavík	Svava Haraldsdóttir	Unplaced		
1990	Garðabær	Ásta Sigríður Einarsdóttir	Unplaced		
1989	Reykjavík	Hugrún Linda Guðmundsdóttir	Unplaced		
1988	Vopnafjörður	Linda Pétursdóttir	Miss World 1988	Miss World Europe	Current License Holder for Miss World Iceland
1987	Reykjavík	Anna Margret Jónsdóttir	2nd Runner-Up	Miss World Europe 1st Runner-Up	
1986	Akureyri	Gígja Birgisdóttir	Unplaced		
1985	Reykjavík	Hólmfríður Karlsdóttir	Miss World 1985	Miss World Europe	
1984	Reykjavík	Berglind Johansen	Top 15		
1983	Álftanes	Unnur Steinsson	Top 7		Also competed in Miss Universe 1983.
1982	Reykjavík	María Björk Sverrisdóttir	Unplaced		
1981	Reykjavík	Ásdís Eva Hannesdóttir	Unplaced		
1980	Did not compete in 1980.				
1979	Reykjavík	Sigrún Sætran	Unplaced		
1978	Vestmannaeyjar	Ásdís Loftsdóttir	Unplaced		
1977	Reykjavík	Sigurlaug Halldórsdóttir	Unplaced		
1976	Reykjavík	Sigríður Olgeirsdóttir	Unplaced		
1975		Halldóra Björk Jónsdóttir	Unplaced		
1974	Did not compete in 1974.				
1973		Nína Breiðfjörd	Unplaced		
1972		Rósa Helgadóttir	Unplaced		
1971		Fanney Bjarnadóttir	Unplaced		
1970		Anna Hansdóttir	Unplaced		
1969		Ragnheiður Pétursdóttir	Unplaced		
1968		Helga Jonsdóttir	Did not compete in 1968.		
1967		Hrefna Wigelund Steinþórsdóttir	Unplaced		
1966		Auður Harðardóttir	Unplaced		
1965		Sigrún Vignisdóttir	Unplaced		
1964		Rósa Einarsdóttir	Unplaced		
1963		María Ragnarsdóttir	Unplaced		
1962		Rannveig Ólafsdóttir	Unplaced		
1961		Jóhanna Kolbrún Kristjánsdóttir	Unplaced		
1960		Kristín Þorvaldsdóttir	Unplaced		
1959		Sigurbjörg Sveinsdóttir	Unplaced		
1958		Hjördís Sigurvinsdóttir	Did not compete in 1958.		
1957		Rúna Brynjólfdóttir	Unplaced		
1956		Ágústa Guðmundsdóttir	Unplaced		
1955		Arna Hjörleifsdóttir	Unplaced		
Did not compete between 1951—1954

== Notes ==
- Unnur Steinsson was Miss Iceland 1983 and finished in the top five positions at the Miss World finals the same year. She is the mother of Unnur Birna Vilhjálmsdóttir who won the Miss Iceland pageant in 2005 and became Miss World 2005. Steinsson was three months pregnant when she carried Unnur and competed in the 1983 contest, which was strictly forbidden and could have led to disqualification. Her daughter, Unnur, as mentioned, won the pageant 22 years later.
- In 2011, Guðlaug Dagmar Jónasdóttir won second place and Sigríður Dagbjört Ásgeirsdóttir won third place.
