= Miss Universe Iceland 2020 =

- Date: 23 October 2020
- Venue: Stapi Center, Reykjanesbær
- Entrants: 15
- Placements: 9
- Winner: Elísabet Hulda Snorradóttir; Glacier Lagoon

Miss Universe Iceland 2020 was the fifth edition of the Miss Universe Iceland competition. The pageant held on 23 October 2020 at the Stapi Center in Reykjanesbær. Originally scheduled for 21 August, the pageant was rescheduled due to the COVID-19 pandemic.

Birta Abiba Þórhallsdóttir crowned Elísabet Hulda Snorradóttir as her successor. Elísabet will represent Iceland at Miss Universe 2020, while Disa Dungal will represent Iceland at Miss Supranational 2021.

== Results ==
Final results	Contestant
Miss Universe Iceland 2020	Glacier Lagoon – Elísabet Hulda Snorradóttir
Miss Supranational Iceland 2021	101 Reykjavík – Disa Dungal
1st Runner-Up	Akureyri – Sunneva Halldórsdóttir
2nd Runner-Up	Breiðholt – Kamilla Kristrúnardóttir Hancock
3rd Runner-Up	Vestmannaeyjar – Díana Iva Gunnarsdóttir
Top 9	Blue Mountains – Alexandra Johnsdóttir; Garðabær – Halla Karen Johnsdóttir; Hafnarfjörður – Mirjam Yrsa Friðleifsdóttir; Northern Lights – Sunna Dögg Jonsdóttir

== Delegates ==
The following delegates were selected for the competition:

Representing	Contestant	Age
101 Reykjavík	Disa Dungal	27
Akureyri	Sunneva Halldórsdóttir	21
Black Sand Beach	Berglind Yr Heiðdísardóttir	18
Blue Mountains	Alexandra Kristín Johnsdóttir	22
Breiðholt	Kamilla Kristrúnardóttir Hancock	20
Egilsstaðir	Heiðrún Anna Eyjólfsdóttir	19
Garðabær	Halla Karen Johnsdóttir	20
Geysir	Jenny Sulollari	26
Glacier Lagoon	Elísabet Hulda Snorradóttir	21
Gullfoss	Thelma Líf Heiðarsdóttir	19
Hafnarfjörður	Mirjam Yrsa Friðleifsdóttir	24
Northern Iceland	Amelia Rún Pétursdóttir	20
Northern Lights	Sunna Dögg Jonsdóttir	23
Reykjavík	Anna Mist Guðmundsdóttir	24
Vestmannaeyjar	Díana Iva Gunnarsdóttir	25

The following delegates were initially selected as competitors, but withdrew from the competition:

Representing	Contestant	Age
Capital Region	Tanja Styrmisdóttir	18
Crystal Beach	Melkorka Sól Sigurjonsdóttir	20
Land of Fire and Ice	Kiana Sif Limehouse	22
Reykjavík Harbor	Móeiður Svala Magnusdóttir	22
Seljalandsfoss	Auðbjörg Helga Óskardóttir	19

== Judges ==
- Aníta Ísey Jónsdóttir – dancer and choreographer
- Hildur María Leifsdóttir – Miss Universe Iceland 2016
- Hrafnhildur Hafsteinsdóttir – Miss Iceland 1995
