= Miss Iceland =

National beauty pageant competition in Iceland

Ungfrú Ísland Organization
- Formation: 1950; 76 years ago
- Type: Beauty pageant
- Headquarters: Reykjavík
- Location: Iceland
- Members: Miss Universe; Miss Earth; Miss Supranational; Miss Cosmo
- Official language: Icelandic
- President: Jorge Esteban; Manuela Ósk Harðardóttir
- Website: www.missuniverseiceland.com

The Miss Iceland (Icelandic: Ungfrú Ísland) is a national beauty pageant in Iceland. Beginning in 2023, the winner represents Iceland at Miss Universe pageant.

== History ==
The competition has been carried out since 1950; in the first year, it was called Miss Reykjavík (Ungfrú Reykjavík). Since 1955, the contest has taken place under the current name Miss Iceland. In the past, there were six regional preliminary contests in each of the five rural regions and in the capital Reykjavík. 20 to 24 candidates, three to four from each region, take part in the finals.

Iceland is one of the most successful countries at the Miss World pageant with three victories, a record for a nation with a population of less than half million people.

In 2023, Jorge Esteban and Manuela Ósk Harðardóttir took the brand of Ungfrú Ísland in Iceland after the original organizers abandoned the brand back in 2018 in order to adopt a new format for Miss World in Miss World Iceland.

=== 2013 applicants ===
Rafn Rafnsson, the new chief executive of the Miss Iceland contest, "in hopes of diversifying the field of contestants beyond the statuesque blonde with striking blue eyes that has become the Icelandic stereotype", said "There is no Miss Iceland stereotype..." One week later, in response to Rafnsson's statement, 1,300 people applied to become Miss Iceland, including several nontraditional candidates, such as:

- Sigríður Guðmarsdóttir, 48, a female governmental minister in Reykjavík
- Reynir Sigurðbjörnsson, 47, a male electrician
- Ása Richardsdóttir, a 49-year-old female producer in the fine arts industry
- Matthildur Helgadóttir-Jónudóttir, a female event manager also in her 40s
- Brynhildur Heiðardóttir Ómarsdóttir, a female literary critic
- Sigríður Ingibjörg Ingadóttir, a female Member of Parliament for the Social Democratic Alliance
- Guðrún Jónsdóttir, a spokesperson for Stígamót (organization that fights sexual abuse against women)
- Hildur Lillendahl, a feminist in Iceland
- Björk Vilhelmsdóttir, a city councilor of Reykjavík and feminist
- Þórdís Elva Þorvaldsdóttir, a writer and actress

In response to the increase of nontraditional applicants, Rafnsson said, "We have to follow the rules set by the international contest." This "means rejecting any applicants younger than 18 or older than 24. In addition to the age limits, contestants must be unmarried, childless and, of course, female." Íris Telma Jonsdóttir, Iceland's 2012 Miss World contestant, "has the unfortunate job of sifting through applications for the coming Miss Iceland contest and the publicity stirred by feminists has even sparked an abnormally high influx of legitimate hopefuls. That means she has a lot more reading to do before selecting the field of 25 women who will actually compete for a chance to move on to Miss World."

== Miss Universe Iceland ==
In 2016, Jorge Esteban (President of PageantSmart Interview Consulting) and Manuela Osk Hardardottir (former Miss Iceland 2002) were awarded the franchise for Miss Universe Iceland by the Miss Universe Organization. The 2020 Miss Universe Iceland competition was held on Friday, October 23, 2020, at Gamla Bio in downtown Reykjavík. The winner was 21 year old Elísabet Hulda Snorradóttir, a second year student at the University of Iceland, majoring in Chinese Studies. She represented Iceland at the Miss Universe 2020 competition. She succeeds Birta Abiba Þórhallsdóttir, Miss Universe Iceland 2019, who placed in the Top 10 at Miss Universe 2019, the highest placement for Iceland since 1962. The Miss Universe Iceland 2021 competition will be held in Reykjavík on September 29, 2021. The winner will go on to compete at the 70th Miss Universe competition in Eilat, Israel scheduled for December 2021. Previously the Miss Iceland (Ungfru Island) pageant would select the representative to Miss Universe.

Began 2023 the Miss Universe Iceland became the main title of Ungfrú Ísland titleholder after the organizers took over the defunct brand.

=== 2023 applicants ===
Ungfrú Ísland under the leadership of Manuela Osk Harðardóttir and Jorge Esteban, one national competition for Icelandic women with multiple opportunities for national and international representation.

New rules:

- Open to contestants ages of at least 18 y/o and under 28 as of 1.1.23
- Contestants may be single, currently married or previously married
- Contestants can be pregnant or have children

== Titleholders ==
=== 1955-2017 ===
Winning International Title
Miss Universe Iceland
Miss World Iceland
Miss International Iceland
Miss Europe Iceland

Year	Ungfrú Ísland
1955	Arna Hjörleifsdóttir
1956	Ágústa Guðmundsdóttir
1957	Bryndís Schram
1958	Sigríður Þorvaldsdóttir
1959	Sigríður Geirsdóttir †
1960	Sigrún Ragnarsdóttir
1961	María Guðmundsdóttir
1962	Guðrún Bjarnadóttir; Miss International 1963
1963	Thelma Ingvarsdóttir; Miss Scandinavia 1963
1964	Pálína Jónmundsdóttir
1965	Sigrún Vignisdóttir
1966	Kolbrún Einarsdóttir
1967	Guðrún Pétursdóttir
1968	Jónína Konráðsdóttir
1969	María Baldursdóttir
1970	Erna Jóhannesdóttir
1971	Guðrún Valgarðsdóttir
1972	Þórunn Símonardóttir
1973	Katrín Gisladóttir
1974	Anna Björnsdóttir
1975	Helga Eldon Jónsdóttir
1976	Guðmunda Jóhannesdóttir
1977	Kristjana Þráinsdóttir; Dethroned
1977	Anna Eðvarðsdóttir
1978	Halldóra Jónsdóttir
1979	Kristín Bernharðsdóttir
1980	Elisabet Traustadóttir
1982	Guðrún Möller
1983	Unnur Steinsson
1984	Berglind Johansen
1985	Halla Bryndis Jonsdóttir
1986	Gígja Birgisdóttir
1987	Anna Margrét Jónsdóttir
1988	Linda Pétursdóttir; Miss World 1988
1989	Hugrún Linda Guðmundsdóttir
1990	Ásta Sigríður Einarsdóttir
1991	Svava Haraldsdóttir
1992	María Rún Hafliðadóttir
1993	Svala Björk Arnardóttir
1994	Margrét Skúladóttir Sigurz
1995	Hrafnhildur Hafsteinsdóttir
1996	Sólveig Guðmundsdóttir
1997	Harpa Harðardóttir
1998	Guðbjörg Hermannsdóttir
1999	Katrín Baldursdóttir
2000	Elín Magnúsdóttir
2001	Ragnheiður Guðnadóttir
2002	Manuela Ósk Harðardóttir; President of Ungfru Island
2003	Ragnhildur Steinunn Jónsdóttir
2004	Hugrún Harðardóttir
2005	Unnur Birna Vilhjálmsdóttir; Miss World 2005
2006	Sif Aradóttir
2007	Jóhanna Vala Jónsdóttir
2008	Alexandra Ívarsdóttir
2009	Guðrún Dögg Rúnarsdóttir
2010	Fanney Ingvarsdóttir
2011	Sigrún Eva Ármannsdóttir
2013	Tanja Ástþórsdóttir
2015	Arna Ýr Jónsdóttir
2016	Anna Lára Orlowska
2017	Ólafía Ósk Finnsdóttir

=== 2016-present ===
Winning International Title

directly

Miss Universe Iceland organization began sending a winner to Miss Universe in 2016 but before Miss Universe Iceland, Miss Iceland (Ungfru Island) Organization franchised the Miss Universe franchise and the main winner went to Miss Universe starting in 1956. In 2016, a brand new of Miss Universe Iceland organized by separate competition which officially selected a national winning title to Miss Universe. Began 2023 On occasion, when the winner does not qualify (due to age) for either contest, a runner-up is sent.

Year	Miss Universe Iceland	2nd Placed	3rd Placed	4th Placed	5th Placed
2016	Hildur María Leifsdóttir; Glacier Lagoon	Sigrún Eva Ármannsdóttir; Akranes	Andrea Sigurðardóttir; Kópavogur	Elísa Gróa Steinþórsdóttir; Breiðholt	Thoranna Thorarins; Westman Islands
2017	Arna Ýr Jónsdóttir; Northern Lights	Ester Elísabet Gunnarsdóttir; Hafnarfjörður	Elísa Gróa Steinþórsdóttir; Garðabær	Hulda Margrét Sigurðardóttir; Southern Iceland	Dagbjört Rúriksdóttir; East Reykjavík
2018	Katrín Lea Elenudóttir; Midnight Sun	Móeiður Svala Magnúsdóttir; Northern Lights	Sunneva Sif Jónsdóttir; Northern Iceland; Queen Beauty Universe 2019	Aníta Ösp Ingólfsdóttir; Crystal Beach	Hulda Vigdísardóttir; 101 District
Year	Miss Universe Iceland	Supranational Iceland	Queen Beauty Iceland	4th Placed	5th Placed
2019	Birta Abiba Þórhallsdóttir; Geysir	Hugrún Birta Egilsdóttir; Garðabær	Hulda Vigdísardóttir; 101 Reykjavík	Elísabet Hulda Snorradóttir; Northern Lights	Kolfinna Mist Austfjord; Akureyri
Year	Miss Universe Iceland	Supranational Iceland	3rd Placed	4th Placed	5th Placed
2020	Elísabet Hulda Snorradóttir; Glacier Lagoon	Disa Dungal; 101 Reykjavík	Sunneva Halldórsdóttir; Akureyri	Kamilla Kristrúnardóttir Hancock; Breiðholt	Díana Iva Gunnarsdóttir; Vestmannaeyjar
2021	Elísa Gróa Steinþórsdóttir; Garðabær	Íris Freyja Salguero Kristínardóttir; Crystal Beach	Hulda Vigdísardóttir; 101 Reykjavík	Elva Björk Jónsdóttir; Gullfoss	Elin Stelludóttir; Breiðholt
2022	Hrafnhildur Haraldsdóttir; East Reykjavík	Ísabella Þorvallsdóttir; Northern Lights	Alexandra Tómasdóttir; Northern Iceland	Þorbjörg Kristinsdóttir; Grafarholt	Elva Björk Jónsdóttir; Gullfoss
Year	Ungfrú Ísland	Supranational Iceland	3rd Placed	4th Placed	5th Placed
2023	Lilja Pétursdóttir; Capital Region	Helena Hafthórsdóttir O'Connor; Reykjavík	Kolfinna Mist Austfjörður; Húsavík	Dagny Osk Garðarsdottir; Midnight Sun	Borghildur Birta Einarsdottir; Northern Lights
2024	Soldis Vala Ivarsdottir; Árbær	Emilia Pora Olafsdottir; Grindavík	Valerija Rjabchuk; Reykjavík	Erika Lif Karadottir; Kópavogur	Harpa Ros Jonsdottir; Þingvellir
Year	Ungfrú Ísland	2nd Placed	3rd Placed	4th Placed	5th Placed
2025	Helena Hafþórsdóttir O'Connor; Reykjavík	Guðrún Eva Hauksdóttir; Esja	Kamilla Guðrún Lowen; Hafnarfjörður	Kristín Anna Jónasdóttir; Reykjavík	Dimmey Rós Lúðvíksdóttir; Digranes
2026	Sigríður Ósk Hrafnkelsdóttir; Hafravatn	Aníta Mist Davíðsdóttir; Esja	Elínborg Hrannarsdóttir; Reykjavík	Nadía Líf Pálsdóttir; Njarðvík	Soffía Ellín Stella Gísladóttir; Miðbær

== Titleholders under Ungfrú Ísland org. ==
=== Miss Universe Iceland ===
- : Declared as Winner
- : Ended as runner-up or top 5/6 qualification
- : Ended as one of the finalists or semifinalists
- : Ended as special awards winner

Ungfrú Ísland winners between 1956 and 2009 competed at Miss Universe pageant. Between 2016 and 2022 the main winner of Miss Universe Iceland went to Miss Universe. Began 2023 the organization of Ungfrú Ísland is official foundation to select the winner to Miss Universe competition under Jorge Esteban and Manuela Ósk Harðardóttir directorship.

Year	Municipality	Ungfrú Ísland	Placement at Miss Universe	Special awards	Notes
Manuela Hardardottir directorship — a franchise holder to Miss Universe from 2023
2026	Reykjavík	Sigríður Ósk Hrafnkelsdóttir	TBA	TBA	
2025	Reykjavík	Helena Hafbórsdóttir O'Connor	Withdrew		
2024	Árbær	Sóldís Vala Ívarsdóttir	Unplaced		Later became Miss Earth Air 2025
2023	Reykjavík	Lilja Pétursdóttir	Unplaced		Later became Miss Supranational Europe 2025
Jorge Esteban and Manuela Hardardottir directorship — a franchise holder to Miss Universe between 2016 and 2022
2022	Reykjavík	Hrafnhildur Haraldsdóttir	Unplaced		Later became Miss Earth Air 2024
2021	Garðabær	Elisa Gróa Steinþórsdóttir	Unplaced		
2020	Reykjavík	Elísabet Hulda Snorradóttir	Unplaced		
2019	Mosfellsbær	Birta Abiba Þórhallsdóttir	Top 10		
2018	Reykjavík	Katrín Lea Elenudóttir	Unplaced		
2017	Kópavogur	Arna Ýr Jónsdóttir	Unplaced		
2016	Kópavogur	Hildur María Leifsdóttir	Unplaced		
Arnar Laufdal Olafsson directorship — a franchise holder to Miss Universe between 2006 and 2009
Did not compete between 2010—2015
2009	Reykjavík	Ingibjörg Egilsdóttir	Top 15		Ungfrú Ísland Universe 2008; allocated to Miss Universe 2009.
Did not compete between 2007—2008
2006	Reykjanesbær	Sif Aradóttir	Unplaced		
Gróa Ásmundsdóttir directorship — a franchise holder to Miss Universe between 1989 and 2003
Did not compete between 2004—2005
2003	Reykjavík	Manuela Ósk Harðardóttir	Withdrew after Preliminary Competition		Dehydration Illness (after preliminary competition) — Manuela was 1st Runner-up at Miss Scandinavia 2002.
Did not compete between 1998—2002
1997	Reykjavík	Solveig Guðmundsdóttir	Unplaced		
1996	Reykjavík	Hrafnhildur Hafsteinsdóttir	Unplaced		
1995	Reykjavík	Margrét Skúladóttir Sigurz	Unplaced		
1994	Reykjavík	Svala Björk Arnardóttir	Unplaced		
1993	Reykjavík	Maria Rún Haflidadóttir	Unplaced		
1992	Reykjavík	Svava Haraldsdóttir	Unplaced		
1991	Akranes	Dis Sigurgeirsdóttir	Unplaced		
1990	Reykjavík	Hildur Dungalsdóttir	Unplaced		
1989	Reykjavík	Guðbjörg Gissurardóttir	Unplaced		
Ólafur Laufdal Jónsson directorship — a franchise holder to Miss Universe between 1956 and 1988
1988	Reykjavík	Anna Margrét Jónsdóttir	Unplaced		
Did not compete in 1987
1986	Reykjavík	Thora Thrastardóttir	Unplaced		
1985	Reykjavík	Hana Bryndis Jonsdóttir	Unplaced		
1984	Reykjavík	Berglind Johansson	Unplaced		
1983	Reykjavík	Unnur Steinsson	Unplaced		
1982	Reykjavík	Guðrún Möller	Unplaced		
1981	Reykjavík	Elisabet Traustadóttir	Unplaced		
1980	Reykjavík	Guðbjörg Sigurdardóttir	Top 12		
1979	Reykjavík	Halldora Björk Jónsdóttir	Unplaced		
1978	Reykjavík	Anna Björk Edwards	Unplaced		Ungfrú Ísland 1977, Kristjana Þráinsdóttir dethroned by Miss Iceland Organization and Anna took over as the successor; previously, Anna was Runner-up in 1977.
1977	Reykjavík	Kristjana Þráinsdóttir	Unplaced		Dethroned as the main winner after competing at Miss Universe 1977.
1976	Reykjavík	Gudmunda Hulda Johannesdottir	Unplaced		
1975	Reykjavík	Helga Eldon Jonsdottir	Unplaced		
1974	Reykjavík	Anna Björnsdóttir	Unplaced	Miss Congeniality	
Did not compete in 1973
1972	Reykjavík	María Kristín Jóhannesdóttir	Unplaced		
1971	Skagafjörður	Guðrún Valgarðsdóttir	Unplaced		
1970	Reykjavík	Erna Jóhannesdottir	Unplaced		
1969	Reykjanesbær	María Baldursdóttir	Unplaced		
1968	Reykjavík	Helen Knuttsdóttir	Unplaced		
1967	Garðabær	Guðrún Pétursdóttir	Unplaced		
1966	Garðabær	Erla Traustadóttir	Unplaced		
1965	Reykjavík	Bára Magnúsdóttir	Unplaced		
1964	Reykjavík	Thelma Ingvarsdóttir	Unplaced		
1963	Reykjanesbær	Theódóra Þórðardóttir	Unplaced		
1962	Mosfellsbær	Anna Geirsdóttir	1st Runner-Up		
1961	Reykjanesbær	Kristjana Magnúsdóttir	Top 15		
1960	Reykjavík	Svanhildur Jakobsdóttir	Unplaced		
1959	Mosfellsbær	Sigríður Þorvaldsdóttir	Top 15		
Did not compete in 1958
1957	Garðabær	Bryndís Schram	Unplaced		
1956	Kópavogur	Guðlaug Guðmundsdóttir	Unplaced		

=== Miss Earth Iceland ===
- : Declared as Winner
- : Ended as one of the elemental court
- : Ended as one of the finalists or semifinalists
- : Ended as special awards winner

Year	Municipality	Ungfrú Ísland―Earth	Placement at Miss Earth	Special awards	Notes
Manuela Hardardottir directorship — a franchise holder to Miss Earth from 2024
2026	Reykjavík	Lilja Pétursdóttir	TBA		
2025	Árbær	Sóldís Vala Ívarsdóttir	Miss Earth Air (1st Runner-Up)		Ungfru Island 2024 was designated to represent Iceland at Miss Earth 2025 in the Philippines.
2024	Reykjavík	Hrafnhildur Haraldsdóttir	Miss Earth Air (1st Runner-Up)		In 2024, Ungfru Island acquisitioned the Miss Earth license, and Ungfru Island 2022 was designated to represent Iceland at Miss Earth 2024 in the Philippines.

=== Miss Supranational Iceland ===
- : Declared as Winner
- : Ended as runner-up
- : Ended as one of the finalists or semifinalists
- : Ended as special awards winner

Miss Universe Iceland organization was also awarded the Miss Supranational Iceland franchise in 2019. Before Miss Universe Iceland, Miss Iceland (Ungfru Island) Organization franchised the Miss Supranational Iceland franchise and the 1st runner-up went to Miss Supranational. On occasion, when the 1st runner-up does not qualify (due to age) for either contest, a 2nd runner-up is sent.

Year	Municipality	Ungfrú Ísland―Supranational	Placement at Miss Supranational	Special awards	Notes
Manuela Hardardottir directorship — a franchise holder to Miss Supranational from 2023
2026	Reykjavík	Hrafnhildur Haraldsdóttir	Top 24		
2025	Reykjavík	Lilja Pétursdóttir	Top 12		
2024	Reykjavík	Helena Hafbórsdóttir O'Connor	Top 25		
2023	Akureyri	Ísabella Þorvaldsdóttir	Unplaced	Miss Talent (Top 8)	
Jorge Esteban and Manuela Hardardottir directorship — a franchise holder to Miss Supranational between 2019 and 2022
2022	Mosfellsbær	Íris Freyja Salguero	Unplaced		
2021	Reykjavík	Disa Dungal	Unplaced		
Due to the impact of COVID-19 pandemic, no competition held in 2020
2019	Reykjavík	Húgrun Birta Egilsdottir	Top 25 (11th place)	Miss Top Model Europe	

=== Miss Cosmo Iceland ===
- : Declared as Winner
- : Ended as one of the elemental court
- : Ended as one of the finalists or semifinalists
- : Ended as special awards winner

Year	Municipality	Ungfrú Ísland―Cosmo	Placement at Miss Cosmo	Special awards	Notes
Manuela Hardardottir directorship — a franchise holder to Miss Cosmo from 2025
2025	Reykjavík	Kristín Anna Jónasdóttir	Unplaced		3rd Runner-up Ungfru Island 2025 was designated to represent Iceland at Miss Cosmo 2025 in Vietnam.

=== Miss Grand Iceland ===
The following is a list of Iceland representatives at the Miss Grand International contest.

Year	Representative	Original national title	Result		National director
Year	Representative	Original national title	Placement	Other awards	National director
2016	Arna Ýr Jónsdóttir	Miss Iceland 2015	Withdrew during the competition		Peter Hadward
Did not compete from 2017 to 2024

== Notes ==
- Unnur Steinsson was Miss Iceland 1983 and finished in the top five positions at the Miss World finals the same year. She is the mother of Unnur Birna Vilhjálmsdóttir who won the Miss Iceland pageant in 2005 and became Miss World 2005. Steinsson was three months pregnant when she carried Unnur and competed in the 1983 contest, which was strictly forbidden and could have led to disqualification. Her daughter, Unnur, as mentioned, won the pageant 22 years later.
- In 2011, Guðlaug Dagmar Jónasdóttir won second place and Sigríður Dagbjört Ásgeirsdóttir won third place.
