= Þórhallsdóttir =

Þórhallsdóttir is a surname. Notable people with the surname include:

- Hera Björk Þórhallsdóttir
- Birta Abiba Þórhallsdóttir
- Dóra Þórhallsdóttir
