= Elísabet Hulda Snorradóttir =

Icelandic model and beauty queen

- Born: 3 December 1998 (age 27); Reykjavík, Iceland
- Education: University of Iceland
- Occupations: Model; beauty pageant titleholder
- Height: 1.75 m (5 ft 9 in)
- Beauty pageant titleholder
- Title: Miss Universe Iceland 2020
- Hair color: Blonde
- Eye color: Blue
- Major competitions: Miss Universe Iceland 2019 (1st Runner-Up); Miss Universe Iceland 2020 (Winner); Miss Universe 2020 (Unplaced)

Elísabet Hulda Snorradóttir (born 3 December 1998) is an Icelandic model and beauty pageant titleholder who was crowned Miss Universe Iceland 2020. She represented Iceland at Miss Universe 2020, where she was unplaced.

== Early life and education ==
Elísabet was born on 3 December 1998 in Reykjavík, as one of seven siblings. After graduating from upper secondary school in 2019, she enrolled in the University of Iceland, majoring in Chinese studies. Elísabet has additionally participated in volunteer work abroad in South Korea, and speaks conversational Korean, Japanese, and Mandarin Chinese due to her participation in volunteer work and language schools.

Prior to becoming Miss Universe Iceland, Elísabet worked with the Icelandic Red Cross and Tölum Saman, an Icelandic organization that teaches the Icelandic language to immigrants to better prepare them for employment and education in Iceland. Elísabet has additionally worked with the Icelandic charity Bumbuloni, which raises money for families with chronically ill children.

== Pageantry ==
Elísabet began her pageantry career in 2019, after she was selected to compete in Miss Universe Iceland 2019. She competed as Miss Northern Lights, and ultimately placed as the first runner-up behind winner Birta Abiba Þórhallsdóttir. She was initially not scheduled to return to the competition the following year, but after the COVID-19 pandemic caused the Miss Universe Iceland 2020 competition to be pushed back from March 2020 to October 2020, Elísabet was added as a new competitor following the withdrawals of several contestants. Competing under the title of Miss Glacier Lagoon, Elísabet went on to win the title.

Awards and achievements
Preceded by Birta Abiba Þórhallsdóttir	Miss Universe Iceland; 2020	Succeeded by Elisa Gróa Steinþórsdóttir
