= Lilja Pétursdóttir =

Icelandic model

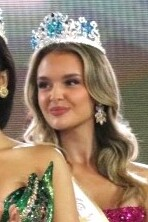
- Pétursdóttir in 2025
- Born: 4 May 2004 (age 22); Reykjavík, Iceland
- Occupation: Model
- Height: 1.68 m (5 ft 6 in)
- Beauty pageant titleholder
- Title: Miss Iceland 2023; Miss Supranational Europe 2025
- Major competitions: Miss Iceland 2023; (Winner); Miss Universe 2023; (Unplaced); Miss Supranational 2025; (Top 12; Miss Photogenic); (Miss Supranational Europe); Miss Earth 2026; (TBD)

Lilja Pétursdóttir (born 4 May 2004) is an Icelandic model and beauty pageant titleholder who was crowned Miss Iceland and represented her country at Miss Universe 2023, where she was unplaced. She later was appointed as Miss Supranational Iceland to compete at Miss Supranational 2025, where she placed as Top 12 and won the title of Miss Supranational Europe.

== Pageantry ==
=== Ungfrú Ísland 2023 ===
In July 2023, Pétursdóttir and 18 other contestants were announced as the Ungfrú Ísland 2023 candidates. In August, 2023, she represented the Capital Region at Ungfru Island 2023 and competed against 17 other finalists in Reykjavik where she won the title.

=== Miss Universe 2023 ===
Pétursdóttir represented Iceland at the 72nd Miss Universe competition held in El Salvador on November 18, 2023, where she was unplaced.

=== Miss Supranational 2025 ===
Pétursdóttir was appointed as Miss Supranational Iceland 2025, and represented Iceland on June 27, at the Strzelecki Park Amphitheater in Nowy Sącz, Poland. She placed at the Top 12 and won the title of Miss Supranational Europe.

Awards and achievements
| Preceded by (Denmark) Victoria Larsen | Miss Supranational Europe; 2025 | Succeeded by (Poland) Oliwia Mikulska |
| Preceded by Helena O’Connor | Miss Supranational Iceland; 2025 | Succeeded by Hrafnhildur Haraldsdóttir |
| Preceded by Hrafnhildur Haraldsdóttir | Miss Iceland; 2023 | Succeeded by Sóldís Ívarsdóttir |
