= Miss Universe Iceland 2016 =

- Date: September 12, 2016
- Venue: Gamla Bio, Reykjavík, Iceland
- Entrants: 30
- Winner: Hildur Maria Leifsdóttir; Glacier Lagoon

The Miss Universe Iceland 2016 pageant was held on September 12, 2016. This year only 30 candidates were competing for the national crown. Each delegate represents a region or a city of the country. The chosen winner was Hildur Maria Leifsdóttir, she represented Iceland at the Miss Universe 2016 but did not place. The winner of best national costume, the costume used at Miss Universe 2016.

== Final results ==
Final results	Contestant
Miss Universe Iceland 2016	Glacier Lagoon - Hildur Maria Leifsdóttir
1st Runner-up	Akranes - Sigrun Eva Armannsdottir
2nd Runner-up	Kópavogur - Andrea Sigurdardottir
3rd Runner-up	Breidholt - Elisa Groa
4th Runner-up	Westman Islands - Thoranna Throrarinsdottir
Top 10	Breidholt - Elisa Groa; Capital Region - Maria Bjork; Northern Lights - Inga Maria; Reykjavík - Kolbrun Ragnarsdottir; West Reykjavík - Sunneva Fjolnisdottir
Top 15	Akranes - Sigrun Armannsdottir; Grafarvogur - Bertha Waagfjord; Akureyri - Soley Gudmarsdottir; North Reykjavík - Olafia Osk; Westman Islands - Thoranna Throrarinsdottir

=== Official Scores ===
Represented	Swimsuit	Gown	Questions
Westman Islands	9.355	9.203	9.534
Versturland	9.659	9.332	9.454
Seltjarnarnes	8.889	8.797	9.023
Selfoss	8.239	8.953	8.900
West Reykjavík	9.002	8.762	
Breidholt	8.535	8.564	
Capital Region	8.083	8.392	
Northern Lights	8.965	8.029	
Reykjavík	9.372	7.900	
North Reykjavík	8.012		
Kópavogur	7.835		
Akranes	7.803		
Glacier Lagoon	7.797		
Grafarvogur	7.665		

Winner
1st Runner-up
2nd Runner-up
3rd Runner-up
4th Runner-up
Top 10
Top 15

== Official delegates ==
Represent	Contestant	Age	Height	Hometown
Akranes	Sigrun Eva Armannsdottir	23	1.75 m (5 ft 9 in)	Akranes
Akureyri	Soley Olof Run Gudmarsdottir	18	1.75 m (5 ft 9 in)	Reykjavík
Breidholt	Elisa Groa Steinporsdottir	22	1.82 m (5 ft 11 1/2 in)	Garðabær
Capital Region	Maria Bjork Einardsdottir	22	1.77 m (5 ft 9 1/2 in)	Reykjavík
Central Iceland	Svetlana Ursodksdottir	19	1.76 m (5 ft 9 1/2 in)	Reykjavík
East Iceland	Nelsa Smith-Gudsdottir	25	1.76 m (5 ft 9 1/2 in)	Reykjavík
East Reykjavík	Ragnhildur Gudmunsdottir	21	1.73 m (5 ft 8 in)	Reykjavík
Garðabær	Soley Augur Mimisdottir	27	1.80 m (5 ft 11 in)	Garðabær
Glacier Lagoon	Hildur Maria Leifsdottir	23	1.78 m (5 ft 10 in)	Kópavogur
Grafarvogur	Bertha Maria Waagfjord	24	1.73 m (5 ft 8 in)	Grafarvogur
Hafnarfjörður	Sigurbjorg Osk Fridleifsdottir	20	1.76 m (5 ft 9 1/2 in)	Hafnarfjörður
Keflavík	Hafdis Hildur Gunnarsdottir	20	1.77 m (5 ft 9 1/2 in)	Keflavík
Kópavogur	Andrea Sigurdardottir	19	1.83 m (6 ft 0 in)	Kópavogur
North Iceland	Hilnur Ossdottir	26	1.77 m (5 ft 9 1/2 in)	Reykjavík
North Reykjavík	Olafia Osk Finnsdottir	18	1.75 m (5 ft 9 in)	Reykjavík
Northeast Iceland	Lydia Sigursleifdottir	20	1.77 m (5 ft 9 1/2 in)	Reykjavík
Northern Lights	Inga Maria Eyjolfsdottir	18	1.76 m (5 ft 9 1/2 in)	Reykjavík
Northwest Iceland	María Jardvigstoon	19	1.84 m (6 ft 1/2 in)	Reykjavík
One Hundred One District	Katrin Njardvik	21	1.76 m (5 ft 9 1/2 in)	Reykjavík
Reykjavík	Kolbrun Elma Ragnarsdottir	21	1.76 m (5 ft 9 1/2 in)	Reykjavík
Selfoss	Arny Helgadottir	21	1.75 m (5 ft 9 in)	Reykjavík
Seltjarnarnes	Herdis Birma Bragadottir	18	1.74 m (5 ft 8 1/2 in)	Seltjarnarnes
South Iceland	Linda Sjofn Jondsdottir	24	1.73 m (5 ft 8 in)	Reykjavík
South Reykjavík	Lana Svelzburger	25	1.75 m (5 ft 9 in)	Reykjavík
Southeast Iceland	Viktoria Maritdottir	26	1.77 m (5 ft 9 1/2 in)	Reykjavík
Southwest Iceland	Indhira Altensdottir	27	1.73 m (5 ft 8 in)	Reykjavík
Versturland	Guðrún Dögg Rúnarsdóttir	25	1.75 m (5 ft 9 in)	Reykjavík
West Iceland	Teresa Almaddottir	20	1.75 m (5 ft 9 in)	Reykjavík
West Reykjavík	Sunneva Fjolnisdottir	22	1.78 m (5 ft 10 in)	Reykjavík
Westman Islands	Thoranna Throrarinsdottir	28	1.77 m (5 ft 9 1/2 in)	Reykjavík
