= Sóldís Ívarsdóttir =

Icelandic model and beauty queen

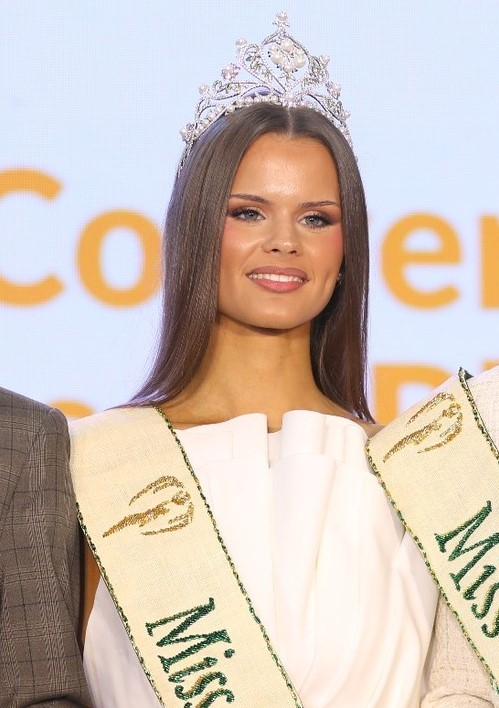
- Ívarsdóttir in 2025
- Born: Sóldís Vala Ívarsdóttir; 23 April 2006 (age 20); Árbær, Reykjavík, Iceland
- Occupation: Model
- Beauty pageant titleholder
- Title: Miss Universe Iceland 2024; Miss Earth Iceland 2025; Miss Earth Air 2025
- Hair color: Brown
- Eye color: Blue
- Major competitions: Miss Universe Iceland (Winner); Miss Universe 2024 (Unplaced); Miss Earth 2025 (Miss Earth Air)

Sóldís Vala Ívarsdóttir (born 23 April 2006) is an Icelandic model and beauty pageant titleholder who was crowned Miss Earth Air 2025 when she competed at Miss Earth 2025. She previously won Miss Universe Iceland 2024 and represented her country at Miss Universe 2024, where she was unplaced.

== Early life ==
Ívarsdóttir was born on 23 April 2006 in Reykjavik. She studied business at Verzlunarskóli Íslands (the Commercial College of Iceland).

== Pageantry ==
=== Ungfrú Ísland 2024 ===
Ívarsdóttir won Miss Universe Iceland 2024 on 14 August 2024, at Gamla Bíó in Reykjavik, representing Árbær, surpassing 24 other contestants. She was crowned by Lilja Pétursdóttir of Capital Region.

=== Miss Universe 2024 ===
Ívarsdóttir represented Iceland at the Miss Universe 2024 pageant held on 16 November 2024, in Mexico City, but was unplaced.

=== Miss Earth 2025 ===
Ívarsdóttir was appointed as Miss Earth Iceland 2025, and represented Iceland on 5 November at the Miss Earth 2025 at Okada Manila in the Philippines.

During the final question-and-answer, she was asked whether she agreed with Bill Gates' view that resources should be redirected from fighting climate change to addressing disease, Ívarsdóttir answered:

I believe that we should take every problem in the world into consideration, and I think we should take care of our people as we care for the Earth. Because if we don't have empathy and don't take care of our people, our family, our nation, and the whole Earth, we can't take care of our Earth. Thank you so much.

She was crowned Miss Earth Air, making her the second Icelander to achieve that title and a back-to-back Miss Earth Air victory for Iceland.

Awards and achievements
Preceded by (Iceland) Hrafnhildur Haraldsdóttir	Miss Earth - Air; 2025	Succeeded by Incumbent
Preceded by Hrafnhildur Haraldsdóttir	Miss Earth Iceland; 2025	Succeeded by Incumbent
Preceded by Lilja Pétursdóttir	Miss Universe Iceland; 2024	Succeeded by Helena Hafbórsdóttir
