= Tavinan Kongkran =

Thai model (born 1964)

- Born: Tavinan Kongkran; June 1, 1964 (age 62); Bangkok, Thailand
- Other name: Ja-oh
- Beauty pageant titleholder
- Title: Thailand representatives at Miss World 1983
- Hair color: Black
- Eye color: Black
- Major competition: Miss World 1983 (Delegetes)

Tavinan Kongkran (Thai: ทวินันท์ คงคราญ) (born June 1, 1964 in Bangkok, Thailand) is a Thai TV host and beauty pageant titleholder who was Thailand's representative at Miss World 1983 in the United Kingdom.
