= Sarah-Jane Hutt =

British model and beauty queen (born 1964)

Sarah-Jane Hutt (born 3 October 1964) is a British model and beauty queen who was the fifth Miss United Kingdom to win the Miss World beauty contest in 1983.

She refused to admit she was the most beautiful woman and some of the unhappy contestants agreed with her.

== Personal life ==
Hutt comes from Poole in Dorset. Hutt is a former pupil of the Mountbatten School in Romsey, Hampshire.

Awards and achievements
Preceded by (Dominican Republic) Mariasela Álvarez	Miss World; 1983	Succeeded by (Venezuela) Astrid Carolina Herrera
Preceded by (Finland) Sari Kaarina Aspholm	Miss World Europe; 1983	Succeeded by (United Kingdom) Vivienne Rooke
Preceded by Della Frances Dolan	Miss United Kingdom; 1983	Succeeded by Vivienne Rooke
