= Anna Bjorn =

Icelandic graphic designer, filmmaker, model, and actress

Anna Björnsdóttir
- Born: 4 July 1954 (age 72)
- Other name: Anna Bjorn
- Occupations: Graphic designer; yoga instructor; documentary filmmaker; model; actress
- Beauty pageant titleholder
- Title: Miss Universe Iceland 1974
- Major competitions: Miss Universe Iceland 1974 (Winner); Miss Universe 1974 (Unplaced)

Anna Björnsdóttir (born 4 July 1954), also known as Anna Bjorn, is an Icelandic graphic designer, yoga instructor, documentary filmmaker, model, actress and beauty pageant title holder. In 1974, she represented Iceland in Miss Universe in Manila and was voted Miss Congenial by her fellow contestants.

== Career ==
In the 1970s and 1980s, Anna had a successful modeling career, being represented by the Ford Modeling Agency in New York and Nina Blanchard in Los Angeles. She was featured in a great number of television commercials both in Europe and the United States and held exclusive contracts with Noxema and Vidal Sassoon. During that time she studied acting in Los Angeles and appeared in several films and television shows in the United States, such as More American Graffiti and The Sword and the Sorcerer and Get Crazy.

In 1982, Anna co-produced, filmed and edited the documentary From Iceland to Brazil, about Icelandic immigrants to Brazil in the 1870s, and in 1987, she produced and directed the documentary Love & War, about the "war brides" of Iceland.

She became a certified yoga instructor in 1994, having practiced yoga since the late 1970s. She opened her own yoga studio, Yogastöð Vesturbæjar/Yoga West, in Reykjavík, Iceland, in 1994 and sold the company in 2007.

In 2003, Anna graduated from the Iceland Academy of the Arts with a BA degree in graphic design. Since then she has worked as a freelance graphic designer, focusing on logo and book design.

== Personal life ==
Anna was married to musician Jakob Frímann Magnússon.

She divides her time between Europe and the United States. Her partner since 1994 is advertising CEO Halldór Guðmundsson.

In 2011, The Boston Globe claimed that she gave the FBI information that led to gangster and fugitive Whitey Bulger's capture. A reward of US$2 million had been offered for information leading to his capture.

== Filmography ==
=== Film ===
Year	Film	Role
1979	More American Graffiti	Eva
1982	The Sword and the Sorcerer	Elizabeth
1982	Með allt á hreinu (On Top: US title)	Hekla
1982	From Iceland to Brazil	producer
1983	Get Crazy	Countess Chantaminaa
1987	Love and War	director/producer

=== Television ===
Year	Title	Role	Other notes
1981	Diff'rent Strokes	Kristin	Guest star
1982	The Devlin Connection	Erica	Guest star
1983/1984	Fantasy Island	Connie/Monique	Guest star
1985	Remington Steele	Reporter	Guest star
1986	Dream West (TV)	Angelique	Guest star
1986	Riptide		Guest star
1991	Shannon's Deal	Ingrid	Guest star
