= Katrín Lea Elenudóttir =

Icelandic model (born 1999)

- Born: 22 February 1999 (age 27)
- Height: 1.70 m (5 ft 7 in)
- Beauty pageant titleholder
- Title: Miss Universe Iceland 2018
- Hair color: Blonde
- Eye color: Blue
- Major competitions: Miss Universe Iceland 2018 (Winner); Miss Universe 2018 (Unplaced)

Katrín Lea Elenudóttir is an Icelandic model and beauty pageant titleholder who was crowned Miss Universe Iceland 2018. She represented Iceland at Miss Universe 2018 pageant in Bangkok, Thailand.

== Early life ==
Katrín was born on 22 February 1999 in Omsk, Russia to a Russian mother Elena Skorobogatova. She is of mixed German, Ukrainian, Armenian, and Russian descent. When she was nine years old, Katrín emigrated from Russia to Iceland after her mother married an Icelandic man, settling in Reykjavík. After arriving in Iceland, she received Icelandic citizenship and learned to speak Icelandic; she is additionally fluent in English and Russian. Katrín attended Menntaskólinn í Reykjavík, the most prestigious high school in Iceland.

== Pageantry ==
Katrín began her pageantry career at Miss Universe Iceland 2018, competing as Miss Midnight Sun. She went on to win the competition, held in Reykjanesbær, being crowned by outgoing titleholder Arna Ýr Jónsdóttir.

As Miss Universe Iceland 2018, Katrín represented Iceland at Miss Universe 2018 in Bangkok.

Awards and achievements
Preceded by Arna Ýr Jónsdóttir	Miss Universe Iceland; 2018	Succeeded by Birta Abiba Þórhallsdóttir
