= Johanna Raunio =

Finnish actress

- Born: 5 November 1954 (age 71); Forssa, Finland

Johanna Raunio (born 5 November 1954 in Forssa) is a Finnish actress, tv host and beauty pageant titleholder who was crowned Miss Finland 1974. Raunio competed in the Miss Universe 1974, Miss International 1974 and Miss Europe 1974 pageants and placed second runner-up in all three competitions. She works nowadays as a hostess and actress. From 2005 to 2009, she played Tanja Jääskeläinen in the Finnish soap series Salatut elämät on MTV3. She has acted also in theatre and in the TV series Tähtitehdas. Her role in both TV series was a mother whose son is killed. In Tähtitehdas her son Kimi dies from a shooting and in Salatut elämät her son Riku dies in a car accident.

Originally, she was scheduled to appear in Salatut elämät for seven weeks, but the role eventually extended to four years. Raunio left the series in May 2009, and her character was removed from the series in late 2009.

Since then, Raunio has worked as a real estate agent.
