= Hrafnhildur Haraldsdóttir =

Icelandic model and beauty queen

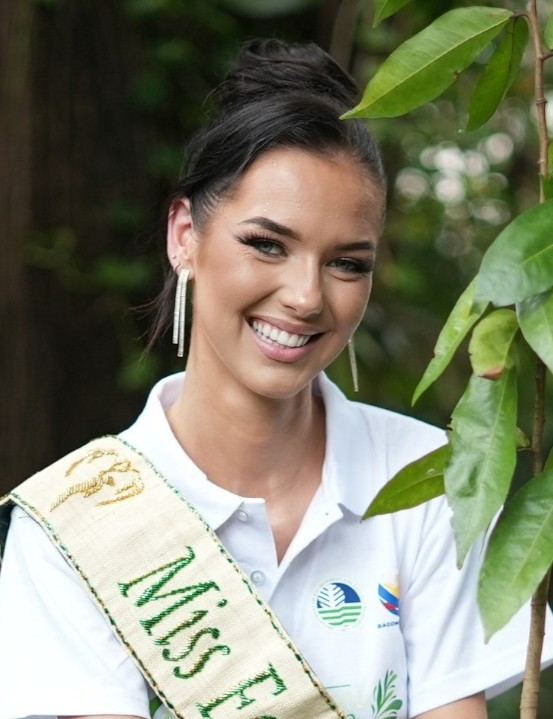
- Haraldsdóttir in 2025
- Born: 7 April 2004 (age 22); Reykjavík, Iceland
- Education: Verzlunarskóli Íslands
- Occupations: Model; beauty pageant titleholder
- Height: 1.72 m (5 ft 8 in)
- Beauty pageant titleholder
- Title: Miss Iceland 2022; Miss Earth Iceland 2024; Miss Earth Air 2024; Miss Supranational Iceland 2026
- Hair color: Black
- Major competitions: Miss Universe 2022; (Unplaced); Miss Earth 2024; (Miss Earth – Air); Miss Supranational 2026; (Top 24)

Hrafnhildur Haraldsdóttir (born 7 April 2004) is an Icelandic model and beauty pageant titleholder who was crowned Miss Earth - Air 2024 when she competed at Miss Earth 2024. She also represented Iceland at Miss Universe 2022, where she was unplaced.

== Early life and education ==
Hrafnhildur Haraldsdóttir has a family ties to the Westfjords region of Iceland, an area known for its remote fishing villages and rugged coastline. She grew up in Keflavík. where she attended A.T. Mahan High School, an institution serving both local students and children of US military personnel stationed at the nearby base.

In 2016, she undertook an extensive journey around the world, visiting multiple countries before continuing her studies in Iceland. Four years later, in 2020, she enrolled at the Verzlunarskóli Íslands (Commercial College of Iceland) where she pursued a bachelor's degree in biology.

Aside from figure skating, Haraldsdóttir also participates in skiing and snowboarding, and she plays the piano.

== Pageantry ==
=== 2022: Miss Iceland ===
In 2022, Haraldsdóttir won the title of Miss Iceland and earned the right to represent Iceland at the Miss Universe 2022 pageant. The competition was held in New Orleans, USA where she went unplaced.

=== 2024: Miss Earth Iceland ===
In 2024, Haraldsdóttir was announced as Miss Earth Iceland 2024. She represented her country at Miss Earth 2024 where she finished as Miss Earth - Air (1st Runner Up), the highest placement for the country in the history of the pageant.

During her reign, she traveled to Belgium to attend the Miss Exclusive 2025 pageant alongside Jessica Lane, the Miss Earth 2024 winner. In July 2025, she visited Tanzania as one of the international ambassadors invited by the government of Tanzania.

Awards and achievements
Preceded by Lilja Pétursdóttir	Miss Supranational Iceland; 2026	Succeeded by Incumbent
Preceded by (Philippines) Yllana Aduana	Miss Earth - Air; 2024	Succeeded by (Iceland) Sóldís Ívarsdóttir
Preceded by Dagbjört Rúriksdóttir	Miss Earth Iceland; 2024	Succeeded by Sóldís Ívarsdóttir
Preceded by Elisa Gróa Steinþórsdóttir	Miss Universe Iceland; 2022	Succeeded by Lilja Pétursdóttir
