= Nia Kurniasih Ardikoesoema =

Indonesian bureaucrat; Miss Universe Indonesia 1974

- Born: Nia Kurniasih Ardikoesoema; March 13, 1948; Bandung, West Java, Indonesia
- Died: April 8, 2018 (aged 70); Santo Borromeus Hospital, Bandung, West Java, Indonesia
- Other name: Nia Ardikoesoema
- Education: Bandung Institute of Technology
- Beauty pageant titleholder
- Title: Miss Universe Indonesia 1974
- Major competitions: Ratu Indonesia 1973; (Unplaced); Miss Universe 1974; (Unplaced)

Nia Kurniasih Ardikoesoema (March 13, 1948 – April 8, 2018) was an Indonesian bureaucrat and beauty pageant titleholder who became the first Indonesian woman to ever compete at Miss Universe in 1974.

After her pageant stint, Ardikoesoema worked as a public official in various government agencies with her final post at the National Archives of Indonesia.

== Background ==
Ardikoesoema was born in Bandung, West Java on March 13, 1948, to a Sundanese parents. After finished her high school at SMA Negeri 2 Bandung, she pursued her degree in environmental engineering at the Bandung Institute of Technology (ITB). She obtained her degree in 1974.

After her pageant foray, Ardikoesoema stayed relatively under the radar. She hold various positions in different government bodies including the Ministry of Public Works and the National Archives.

On April 8, 2018, at 20:59 WIB Ardikoesoema passed away after undergoing an intensive treatment at the Santo Borromeus Hospital, Bandung. She was survived by her husband and two sons.

== Pageantry ==
=== Ratu Jawa Barat and Ratu Indonesia ===
Ardikoesoema started her foray into the world of pageantry by joining a campus pageant at the Bandung Institute of Technology. She didn't win the title, but it opened a door to join a city-level competition, Ratu Kota Kembang in her hometown Bandung, where she placed as a runner up.

Later, the wife of Bandung mayor recommended her to take part in the Ratu Jawa Barat 1973 competition which she eventually won. As a winner, Ardikoesoema represented her home province at the Ratu Indonesia 1973 pageant. She however only bagged a subsidiary title as Miss Personality. The main crown went to Lydia Arlini Wahab.

=== Miss Universe ===
In 1974, for the first time Miss Universe was held in Asia, in the capital of the Philippines, Manila. It is said that the local organizer invited the neighboring Indonesia to join.

Despite not winning the national title, Ardikoesoema was chosen to be the first Indonesian delegate to ever compete at the Miss Universe.

== See also ==
- Miss Universe Indonesia
- Miss Universe 1974

Awards and achievements
New title	Miss Universe Indonesia; 1974	Succeeded by Jakarta SCR; Lydia Arlini Wahab
