= Miss Europe 1974 =

International beauty pageant

- Date: 29 May 1974
- Venue: Vienna, Austria
- Entrants: 19
- Placements: 6
- Withdrawals: Yugoslavia
- Returns: Malta & Norway
- Winner: Maria Isabel Lorenzo; Spain
- Congeniality: Maria Isabel Lorenzo; Spain
- Photogenic: Johanna Raunio; Finland
- Miss Elegance: Johanna Raunio; Finland

Miss Europe 1974 was the 37th edition of the Miss Europe pageant and the 26th edition under the Mondial Events Organization. It was held in Vienna, Austria on 29 May 1974. Maria Isabel "Maribel" Lorenzo Saavedra of Spain was crowned Miss Europe 1974 by outgoing titleholder Anna "Anke" Maria Groot of Holland. The 1975 contest was originally scheduled to take place in Beirut, Lebanon but was cancelled due to the Lebanese Civil War. The contest returned in 1976.

== Results ==
=== Placements ===
Placement	Contestant
Miss Europe 1974	Spain – María Isabel Lorenzo
1st Runner-Up	Portugal – Ana Paula Freitas
2nd Runner-Up	Finland – Johanna Raunio
3rd Runner-Up	Holland – Gerarda "Gemma" Sophia Balm
4th Runner-Up	England – Kathleen Ann Celeste Anders
5th Runner-Up	Switzerland – Christine Lavanchy

=== Special awards ===
Award	Contestant
Miss Elegance	Finland – Johanna Raunio
Miss Friendship	Spain – María Isabel Lorenzo
Miss Photogenic	Finland – Johanna Raunio

== Contestants ==
- Austria – Margit Schwarzer
- Belgium – Anne-Marie Sophie Sikorski
- Cyprus – Joanna (Ιrini-Ioanna) Melanidou
- England – Kathleen Ann Celeste Anders
- Finland – Riitta Johanna Raunio
- France – Edna Tepava
- Germany – Monja Bageritz
- Greece – Katerina Papadimitriou (real name: Katerina Bakalli)
- Holland – Gerarda "Gemma" Sophia Balm
- Ireland – Yvonne Costelloe
- Italy – Tanina di Grado
- Luxembourg – Gisèle Azzeri
- Malta – Jane Attard
- Norway – Solveig Boberg
- Portugal – Ana Paula da Silva Freitas
- Spain – María Isabel "Maribel" Lorenzo Saavedra
- Sweden – UNKNOWN
- Switzerland – Christine Lavanchy
- Turkey – Sibel Kamman

== Notes ==
=== Withdrawals ===
- Yugoslavia

=== Returns ===
- Malta
- Norway

== "Comité Officiel et International Miss Europe" 1974 Competition ==
Miss Europa 1974
- Date: 26 April 1974
- Venue: Oasis Maspalomas Hotel, Maspalomas, Las Palmas, Canary Islands, Spain
- Entrants: 19
- Placements: 9
- Debuts: England, Spain & Turkey
- Withdrawals: Austria, Czechoslovakia, Finland, Mediterranean & Yugoslavia
- Returns: Denmark, Germany, Liechtenstein, Poland & Sweden
- Winner: Wenche Steen; Norway

From 1951 to 2002 there was a rival Miss Europe competition organized by the "Comité Officiel et International Miss Europe". This was founded in 1950 by Jean Raibaut in Paris, the headquarters later moved to Marseille. The winners wore different titles like Miss Europe, Miss Europa or Miss Europe International.

This year, the contest took place at the Oasis Maspalomas Hotel in Maspalomas, Las Palmas, Canary Islands, Spain on 26 April 1974. There 19 contestants all representing different countries and regions of Europe. At the end, Wenche Steen of Norway was crowned as Miss Europa 1974. She succeeded predecessor Diana Scapolan of Italy.

=== Placements ===
Placement	Contestant
Miss Europa 1974	Norway – Wenche Steen
1st Runner-Up	Spain – Maria del Rocío Martín
2nd Runner-Up	Monaco – Dany Coutelier
Top 9	Belgium – Marie Chantal de Marque; France – Evelyne Quittard; Holland – Yvonne Jansen; Poland – Izabella Lipka; Sweden – Helene Yvonne Apelgren; Turkey – Sibel Kamman

=== Special awards ===
Award	Contestant
Best National Costume	Greece – Lia Vasiliou
Miss Beautiful Legs	Holland – Yvonne Jansen
Miss Elegance	France – Evelyne Quittard
Miss Photogenic	Turkey – Sibel Kamman
Miss Tourism Europe	Sweden – Helene Yvonne Apelgren

==== Miss Tourism Europe ====
Final results	Contestant
Miss Tourism Europe	Sweden – Helene Yvonne Apelgren
2nd place	Germany – Christel Kalkenhauser
3rd place	Switzerland – Daniele Farquet

=== Contestants ===
- Belgium – Marie Chantal de Marque
- Corsica – Marie Paule Achard
- Denmark – Lone Christensen
- England – UNKNOWN
- France – Evelyne Quittard
- Germany – Christel Kalkenhauser
- Greece – Lia Vasiliou
- Holland – Yvonne Jansen
- Ireland – UNKNOWN
- Italy – Lucía Luisa Simonelli
- Liechtenstein – Marinella Taboni
- Luxembourg – Viviane Rauch
- Monaco – Dany Coutelier
- Norway – Wenche Steen
- Poland – Izabella Lipka
- Spain – Maria del Rocío Martín Madrigal
- Sweden – Helene Yvonne Apelgren
- Switzerland – Daniele Farquet
- Turkey – Sibel Kamman

=== Notes ===
==== Withdrawals ====
- Austria
- Czechoslovakia
- Finland
- (Cyprus) (France) (Greece) (Italy) (Malta) (Monaco) Mediterranean
- Yugoslavia

==== Returns ====
- Denmark
- Germany
- Liechtenstein
- Poland
- Sweden

==== Debuts ====
- England
- Spain
- Turkey

== "Comité Officiel et International Miss Europe" 1975 Competition ==
Miss Europa 1975
- Date: May 1975
- Venue: Holiday Inn Hotel, Monaco
- Entrants: 19
- Placements: 3
- Debuts: Andorra, Elegance (Miss Elegance), Portugal, Scotland & Wales
- Withdrawals: Corsica, Greece, Italy, Liechtenstein, Monaco, Poland & Turkey
- Returns: Mediterranean & Yugoslavia
- Winner: Vivianne Van der Cauter; Belgium

In 1975, the contest was held again and it took place at the Holiday Inn Hotel in Monaco in May 1975. There 19 contestants all representing different countries and regions of Europe. At the end, Vivianne Van der Cauter of Belgium was crowned as Miss Europa 1975. She succeeded predecessor Wenche Steen of Norway.

=== Placements ===
Final results	Contestant
Miss Europa 1975	Belgium – Vivianne Van der Cauter
1st runner-up	France – Dany Voissin-Renucci
2nd runner-up	Spain – Carmen García

=== Contestants ===
- Andorra – Rosalina Mestres
- Belgium – Vivianne Van der Cauter
- Denmark – UNKNOWN
- Elegance (Miss Elegance) – UNKNOWN
- England – UNKNOWN
- France – Dany Voissin-Renucci
- Germany – UNKNOWN
- Holland – Marga Scheide
- Ireland – UNKNOWN
- Luxembourg – UNKNOWN
- (Cyprus) (France) (Greece) (Italy) (Malta) (Monaco) Mediterranean – UNKNOWN
- Norway – Kate Rasmussen
- Portugal – UNKNOWN
- Scotland – UNKNOWN
- Spain – Carmen García
- Sweden – UNKNOWN
- Switzerland – UNKNOWN
- Wales – UNKNOWN
- Yugoslavia – UNKNOWN

=== Notes ===
==== Withdrawals ====
- Corsica
- Greece
- Italy
- Liechtenstein
- Monaco
- Poland
- Turkey

==== Returns ====
- (Cyprus) (France) (Greece) (Italy) (Malta) (Monaco) Mediterranean
- Yugoslavia

==== Debuts ====
- Andorra
- Elegance (Miss Elegance)
- Portugal
- Scotland
- Wales
