= Manuela Ósk Harðardóttir =

Icelandic beauty queen and a model (born 1983)

- Born: 29 August 1983 (age 42); Reykjavík, Iceland
- Known for: Beauty queen, model, style

Manuela Ósk Harðardóttir (born 29 August 1983) is an Icelandic beauty queen and a model. She was crowned Miss Reykjavik and Miss Iceland in 2002. She represented her country in Miss Scandinavia and was 1st runner-up. She also went to compete in Miss Universe 2003 in Panama City. She was hospitalized two days before the pageant, due to dehydration, and could not compete.

Manuela married footballer Grétar Rafn Steinsson on 27 November 2007 in Alkmaar, Netherlands. They divorced in 2011.

In 2016 she completed her B.A. degree in Fashion design from the Icelandic Academy of the Arts in Reykjavík. As of 2016, she is studying for a B.A. in social media at FIDM, Los Angeles.
