= Unnur Birna Vilhjálmsdóttir =

Icelandic actress and beauty queen

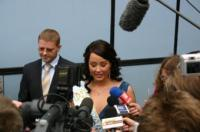
- Born: 25 May 1984 (age 42); Reykjavík, Iceland
- Occupations: Actress, beauty queen
- Height: 1.74 m (5 ft 8 1/2 in)
- Spouse: Pétur Rúnar Heimisson (m. 2009)
- Children: 3
- Beauty pageant titleholder
- Title: Miss Iceland 2005; Miss World 2005
- Years active: 1994-present
- Hair color: Brown
- Eye color: Green
- Major competitions: Miss Iceland 2005 (Winner); Miss World 2005 (Winner)

Unnur Birna Vilhjálmsdóttir (born 25 May 1984) is an Icelandic actress and beauty queen who won Miss Iceland 2005 and the Miss World 2005 pageant. Vilhjàlmsdóttir was the third woman from Iceland to win the Miss World title, after in 1985 and 1988.

== Career ==
=== Beauty Queen ===
She was crowned Miss World 2005 on 10 December 2005 in the Crown of Beauty Theatre, located in the Chinese beach city of Sanya, by the reigning beauty queen, 2004's Miss Peru Maju Mantilla.

Mexico (Dafne Molina Lona) and Puerto Rico (Ingrid Marie Rivera) were the first and second runners up. Other contestants who made it into the final six were Miss Italy (Sofia Bruscoli), Miss Korea (Oh Eun-young), and Miss Tanzania (Nancy Abraham Sumari).

=== Education and Miss World ===
In 2005, she studied anthropology at the University of Iceland and planned to proceed with studies to become a lawyer. During the summer of 2005, Unnur Birna did temporary work as a police officer at Keflavík International Airport. She was the chairperson of the college social club and teaches dance. She enjoys acting, singing, all types of dancing, snow-boarding, hiking, camping, horsemanship, and has a special talent for choreography and playing the piano.

Her mother, Unnur Steinsson, won the Miss Iceland pageant in 1983 and was a finalist at the Miss World 1983 pageant. Unnur's mother was 3–4 months pregnant during the pageant. This was against the pageant rules and warrants disqualification. However, this was not found out until after the pageant was over. Unnur is the third Miss World from Iceland; the former two were Linda Pétursdóttir in 1988 and Hólmfríður Karlsdóttir in 1985. And she was crowned Miss World 2005 by her predecessor, María Julia Mantilla, from Peru.

Unnur Birna's reign as Miss World was the shortest ever, which only lasted nine months since the 2006 edition was scheduled in September. During her reign, she traveled to the United Kingdom, the United States, Iceland, Poland, Sweden, China, Brazil, and many more countries.

She crowned her successor, Taťána Kuchařová of Czech Republic, on 30 September 2006.

=== Acting ===
Unnur has starred in the movie The Higher Force as Anna – the girl on the dance floor. In 2009, she portrayed a character named Tóta in a movie named Jóhannes.

=== Commercial model ===
In 2011, Unnur featured in an advert promoting The Blue Lagoon, a geothermal spa and tourist attraction in Iceland.

=== Master of ceremonies ===
Unnur hosted the "Miss Reykjavik 2010" pageant.

== Personal life ==
On 4 August 2009, Unnur married her long-term partner Pétur Rúnar Heimisson

== Filmography ==
Year	Film	Role	Other notes
2008	Stóra planið	Anna	
2009	Jóhannes	Tóta	Supporting role

Awards and achievements
Preceded by (Peru) María Julia Mantilla	Miss World; 2005	Succeeded by (Czech Republic) Taťána Kuchařová
Preceded by Hugrún Harðardóttir	Miss Iceland; 2005	Succeeded by Sif Aradóttir
