= Miss World 1983 =

Beauty pageant edition

- Miss World 1983 Titlecard
- Date: 17 November 1983
- Presenters: Peter Marshall; Judith Chalmers
- Entertainment: Leo Sayer
- Venue: Royal Albert Hall, London, United Kingdom
- Broadcaster: Thames Television
- Entrants: 72
- Placements: 15
- Debuts: Poland; Tonga
- Withdrawals: French Polynesia; Sri Lanka; Zimbabwe
- Returns: Austria; Barbados; Gambia; Liberia; Swaziland
- Winner: Sarah-Jane Hutt; United Kingdom

Miss World 1983, the 33rd edition of the Miss World pageant, was held on 17 November 1983 at the Royal Albert Hall in London, the United Kingdom.

At the end of the event, Sarah-Jane Hutt of the United Kingdom was crowned Miss World 1983 by the previous winner, Mariasela Álvarez of the Dominican Republic. It is the fourth victory of the United Kingdom in the pageant's history (because Helen Morgan resigned during 1974, the year of her reign, and she was replaced by Anneline Kriel, Morgan's first runner-up from South Africa) And the first runner-up was Rocío Isabel Luna representing Colombia and second runner-up was Cátia Pedrosa representing Brazil.

== Background ==
Miss World 1983 marked the first Miss World event that included an intelligence test for contestants. The intelligence test was created by psychologists.

=== Debuts, returns, withdrawals ===
This edition marked the debut of Poland and Tonga. And the return of The Gambia, which last competed in 1970, Liberia last competed in 1972, Barbados last competed in 1975, Austria last competed in 1981 and Swaziland last competed in 1980.

French Polynesia, (Note: Competed as Tahiti in the pageant) Sri Lanka and Zimbabwe withdrew from the competition for unknown reasons.

== Results ==
=== Placements ===
Placement	Contestant
Miss World 1983	United Kingdom – Sarah-Jane Hutt
1st Runner-Up	Colombia – Rocío Isabel Luna
2nd Runner-Up	Brazil – Cátia Pedrosa
Top 7	Iceland – Unnur Steinsson; Jamaica – Catherine Levy; Panama – Marissa Burgos; United States – Lisa Allred
Top 15	Austria – Mercedes Stermitz; Belgium – Françoise Bostoen; Bolivia – Ana María Taboada; Holland – Nancy Heynis; Hong Kong – Margaret Cheung; Ireland – Patricia Nolan; Israel – Yi'fat Schechter; Yugoslavia – Bernarda Marovt

=== Continental Queens of Beauty ===
Continental Group	Contestant
Africa	Liberia – Annie Broderick
Americas	Colombia – Rocío Isabel Luna
Asia	Israel – Yi'fat Schechter
Europe	United Kingdom – Sarah-Jane Hutt
Oceania	Australia – Tanya Bowe

== Contestants ==
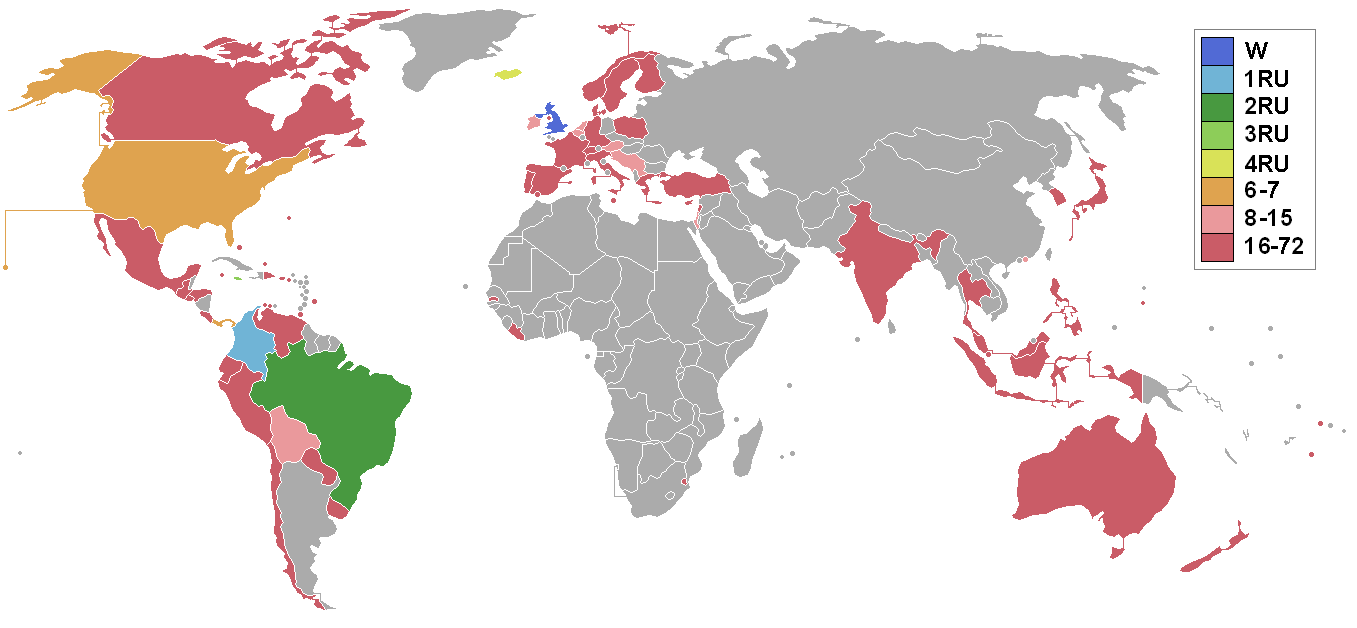
Countries and territories which sent delegates and results for Miss World 1983

72 contestants competed for the title.

Country/Territory	Contestant	Age (Note: Ages at the time of the pageant)	Hometown
Aruba	Audrey Bruges	17	Oranjestad
Australia	Tanya Bowe	20	Adelaide
Austria	Mercedes Stermitz	25	Klagenfurt
(The Bahamas) Bahamas	Lucille Bullen	20	Nassau
Barbados	Nina McIntosh-Clarke	24	Bridgetown
Belgium	Françoise Bostoen	20	Roeselare
Bermuda	Angelita Emily Diaz	20	St. George's
Bolivia	Ana María Taboada	18	Tarija
Brazil	Cátia Pedrosa	20	Rio de Janeiro
Canada	Katharine Durish	25	Toronto
Cayman Islands	Effie Ebanks	18	George Town
Chile	Gina Rovira	19	Santiago
Colombia	Rocío Isabel Luna	18	El Banco
Costa Rica	María Argentina Meléndez	20	San José
(Netherlands Antilles) Curaçao	Ivette Domacasse	22	Willemstad
Cyprus	Katia Chrysochou	20	Paphos
Denmark	Tina-Lissette Joergensen	18	Holstebro
Dominican Republic	Yonoris Estrella	20	Azua de Compostela
Ecuador	Martha Isabel Lascano	20	Guayaquil
El Salvador	Carmen Álvarez	18	San Salvador
Finland	Sanna Pekkala	20	Helsinki
France	Frederique Leroy	20	Bordeaux
(The Gambia) Gambia	Abbey Scattrel Janneh	19	Banjul
Gibraltar	Jessica Palao	19	Gibraltar
Greece	Anna Martinou	17	Athens
Guam	Geraldine Santos	22	Chalan Pago-Ordot
Guatemala	Hilda Manrique	23	Guatemala City
(Netherlands) Holland	Nancy Heynis	18	Amsterdam
Honduras	Carmen Isabel Morales	18	Puerto Cortés
(British Hong Kong) Hong Kong	Maggie Cheung	19	Hong Kong Island
Iceland	Unnur Steinsson	20	Álftanes
India	Sweety Grewal	21	Bombay
Indonesia	Titi Dwi Jayati	17	Jakarta
(Republic of Ireland) Ireland	Patricia Nolan	19	Dublin
Isle of Man	Jennifer Huyton	18	Bride
Israel	Yi'fat Schechter	20	Tel Aviv
Italy	Barbara Previato	17	Modena
Jamaica	Catherine Levy	21	Kingston
Japan	Mie Nakahara	22	Tokyo
Lebanon	Douchka Abi-Nader	17	Beirut
Liberia	Annie Broderick	24	Montserrado
Malaysia	Michelle Yeoh	21	Ipoh
Malta	Odette Balzan	19	Rabat
Mexico	Mayra Rojas	19	Mexico City
New Zealand	Maria Sando	18	Palmerston North
Norway	Karen Dobloug	21	Furnes
Panama	Marissa Burgos	19	Panama City
Paraguay	Antonella Filartiga	21	Asunción
Peru	Lisbet Aurora Alcázar	20	Lima
Philippines	Marilou Sadiua	22	Manila
(Polish People's Republic) Poland	Lidia Wasiak	21	Szczecin
Portugal	Cesaltina da Silva	20	Lisbon
Puerto Rico	Fátima Mustafá	17	Aibonito
Singapore	Sharon Denise Wells	22	Singapore
South Korea (Note: Competed as Korea in the pageant)	Suh Min-sook	20	Seoul
Spain	Milagros Pérez	21	Gran Canaria
(Eswatini) Swaziland	Gladys Rudd	22	Manzini
Sweden	Eva Liza Törnquist	18	Stockholm
Switzerland	Patricia Lang	19	Zürich
Thailand	Tavinan Kongkran	19	Bangkok
Tonga	Rosetta Moa Johansson	18	Neiafu
Trinidad and Tobago	Esther Juliette Farmer	24	San Fernando
Turkey	Ebru Özmeriç	18	Istanbul
Turks and Caicos Islands	Cheryl Astwood	19	Grand Turk
United Kingdom	Sarah-Jane Hutt	19	Dorset
United States	Lisa Gayle Allred	22	Fort Worth
United States Virgin Islands	Chandra Ramsingh	18	St. Croix
Uruguay	Silvia Zumarán	21	Montevideo
Venezuela	Carolina Cerruti	21	Caracas
West Germany	Claudia Zielinski	19	Lindenberg
Western Samoa	Theresa Vaotapu Thomsen	19	Apia
(Socialist Federal Republic of Yugoslavia) Yugoslavia	Bernarda Marovt	23	Ljubljana
