= Arna Ýr Jónsdóttir =

Icelandic model

- Born: 30 May 1995 (age 31); Kópavogur, Iceland
- Occupations: Model; beauty pageant titleholder; pole vaulter
- Height: 173 cm (5 ft 8 in)
- Children: 3
- Beauty pageant titleholder
- Title: Miss Iceland 2015; Miss Universe Iceland 2017
- Hair color: Blonde
- Eye color: Blue
- Major competitions: Miss Iceland 2015 (Winner); Miss World 2015 (Unplaced); Miss Universe Iceland 2017 (Winner); Miss Universe 2017 (Unplaced)

Arna Ýr Jónsdóttir
Personal information
- Nationality: Icelandic
- Born: 30 May 1995 (age 31) Kópavogur, Iceland

Sport
- Sport: Athletics
- Event: Pole vault
Medal record
Representing Iceland
European Team Championships
| Bronze medal – third place | 2014 Tbilisi | Pole vault |

Arna Ýr Jónsdóttir (born 30 May 1995) is an Icelandic model, beauty pageant titleholder, and pole vaulter. She was crowned Miss Iceland 2015, and represented her country at Miss World 2015. Arna later won Miss Universe Iceland 2017 and represented Iceland at Miss Universe 2017.

Arna made international headlines after withdrawing from the Miss Grand International 2016 pageant, claiming that pageant organizer Nawat Itsaragrisil asked her to lose weight in order to succeed in the competition.

== Life and career ==
=== Athletics ===
Arna is a track and field athlete specialising in the pole vault. She has won the Icelandic women's championship, and won the bronze medal at the 2014 European Team Championships in Tbilisi.

=== Pageantry ===
Arna received her first national title after being crowned Miss Iceland 2015 in September 2015. In June 2016, she won the Miss Euro pageant. She went on to represent Iceland at Miss World 2015, where she was unplaced. Arna Ýr was later appointed Miss Grand Iceland and competed at Miss Grand International 2016, but withdrew after being told by pageant organizers that she needed to lose weight. Following her withdrawal, the story was reported on by several international news outlets, such as CNN and The Independent. Afterwards, Nike hired her as a brand representative. In 2017, Arna won Miss Universe Iceland 2017, and represented Iceland at Miss Universe 2017. Her reign ended after crowning Katrín Lea Elenudóttir as Miss Universe Iceland 2018 in August 2018.

== Achievements ==
| Year | Competition | Venue | Position | Notes |
Representing Iceland
| 2014 | European Team Championships | Tbilisi, Georgia | 3rd | 3.50 m |

== Personal life ==
Arna gave birth to her first child with partner Vignir Þór Bollason in 2019. Together they have three children.

Awards and achievements
| Preceded by Tanja Ástþórsdóttir | Miss Iceland; 2015 | Succeeded by Anna Orlowska |
| Preceded by Hildur María Leifsdóttir | Miss Universe Iceland; 2017 | Succeeded by Katrín Lea Elenudóttir |
