= Miss Universe 1974 =

23rd Miss Universe pageant

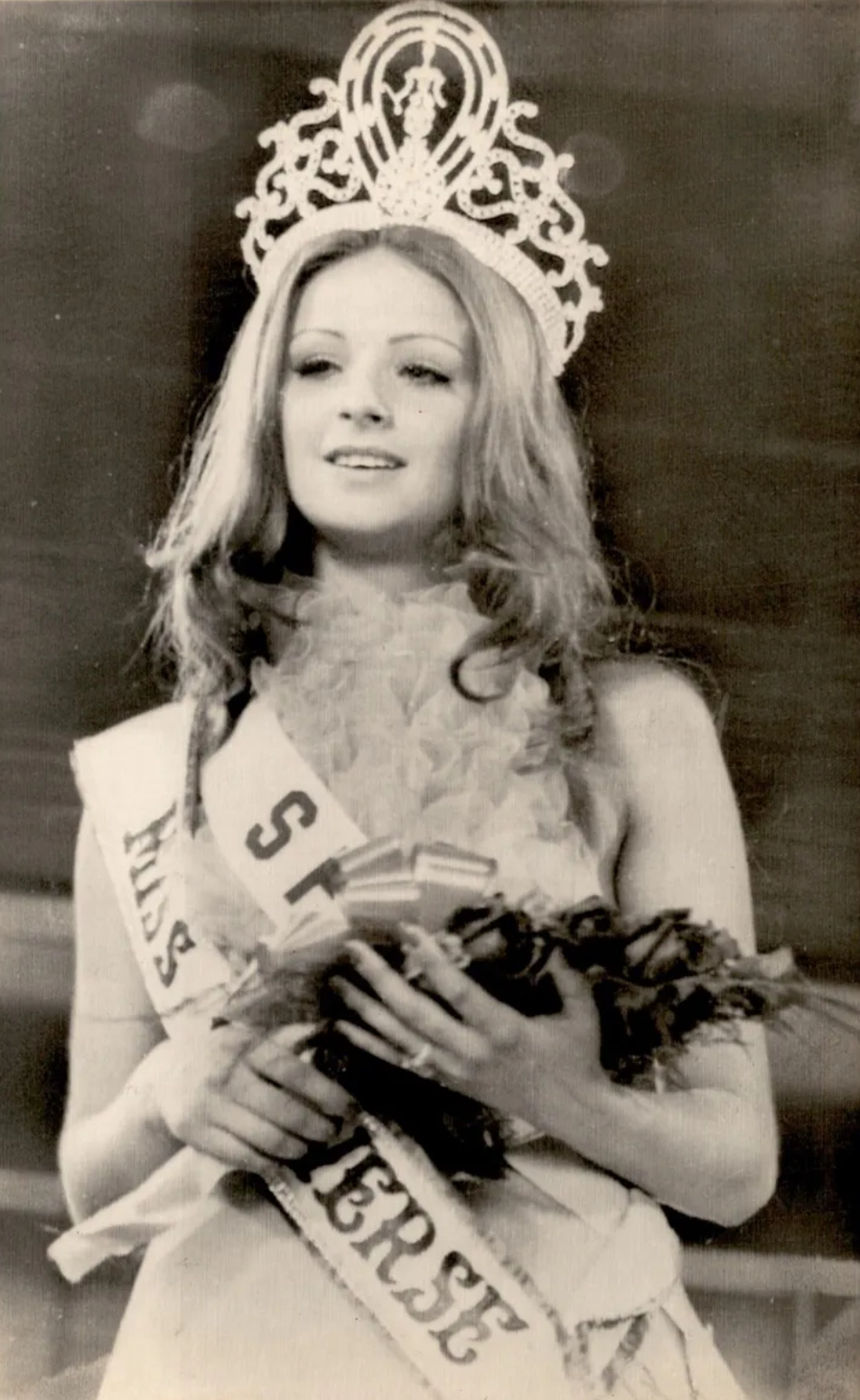
- Amparo Muñoz
- Date: 21 July 1974 (Note: The event was held at 8:00 am Philippine Standard Time (UTC+08:00); for the Americas, this was July 20 in their local times.)
- Presenters: Bob Barker; Helen O'Connell
- Venue: Folk Arts Theater, Manila, Philippines
- Broadcaster: CBS (international); KBS (DZKB-TV) (official broadcaster)
- Entrants: 65
- Placements: 12
- Debuts: Indonesia; Liberia; Senegal
- Withdrawals: Denmark; Norway
- Returns: Bahamas; Iceland; Yugoslavia
- Winner: Amparo Muñoz; Spain
- Congeniality: Anna Bjorn (Iceland)
- Best National Costume: Kim Jae-kyu (South Korea)
- Photogenic: Johanna Raunio (Finland)

Miss Universe 1974 was the 23rd Miss Universe pageant, held at the Folk Arts Theater in Pasay City, Philippines, on 21 July 1974. It was the first Miss Universe pageant to be staged in the Philippines, and the first in Asia.

At the conclusion of the event, Margarita Moran of the Philippines crowned Amparo Muñoz of Spain as Miss Universe 1974. It is the first victory for Spain in the pageant's history. Six months later, Muñoz, after refusing a planned travel to Japan, decided to relinquish her title. Helen Morgan of Wales, the first runner-up, was unable to assume the title and fulfill the duties of Miss Universe 1974, because she went on to win Miss World 1974, although a controversy would force her to resign four days later. The title was not offered to any of the runners-up and Muñoz was still recognized as the official titleholder.

Contestants from sixty-five countries and territories participated in this year's pageant. The pageant was hosted by Bob Barker in his eighth consecutive year, while Helen O'Connell provided commentary and analysis throughout the event.

== Background ==
Folk Arts Theater (now Tanghalang Francisco Balagtas), venue of the pageant

=== Location and date ===
On 3 August 1971, the Miss Universe Organization and the Government Economic Development Administrator of Puerto Rico signed a contract to bring Miss Universe and Miss USA to San Juan from 1972 to 1976. However, the Puerto Rican government canceled the agreement in February 1973 because, according to Puerto Rican government officials, the agreement was allegedly illegal.

On 28 November 1973, Harold Glasser, president of Miss Universe Inc. and Consul-General of the Philippine Consulate, Ernesto Pineda, announced that the Miss Universe 1974 pageant would be held in Manila on 21 July 1974. This was the first time that the pageant was held in Asia.

The Philippine government originally planned to build an open-air amphitheater at the Cultural Center of the Philippines Complex. However, since the pageant would be held during the wet season in the Philippines, they have decided to build a theater, which was later named the Folk Arts Theater. Then-First Lady Imelda Marcos commissioned the Folk Arts Theater for the Miss Universe 1974 pageant, which was designed by Leandro Locsin and was built in just seventy-seven days. The theater was inaugurated on 7 July 1974, with a lavish parade showcasing Philippine art, called Kasaysayan ng Lahi. The candidates of the Miss Universe 1974 pageant were invited to attend the parade.

On July 20, a day before the Miss Universe pageant, Typhoon Ivy – known in the country as Iliang – hit the island of Luzon, causing an estimated $2 million in damage. In order for the pageant to push through, then-First Lady Imelda Marcos ordered the Philippine Air Force to clear the clouds associated with Typhoon Ivy. The United States Air Force also sent a plane from Guam to assist in clearing the clouds.

=== Selection of participants ===
Contestants from sixty-five countries and territories were selected to compete in the pageant.

==== Debuts, returns, and, withdrawals ====
This edition saw the debuts of Indonesia, Liberia, and Senegal, and the returns of Yugoslavia which last competed in 1969; and the Bahamas and Iceland which last competed in 1972. Both Jane Moller of Denmark and Solveig Boberg of Norway withdrew for undisclosed reasons.

== Results ==
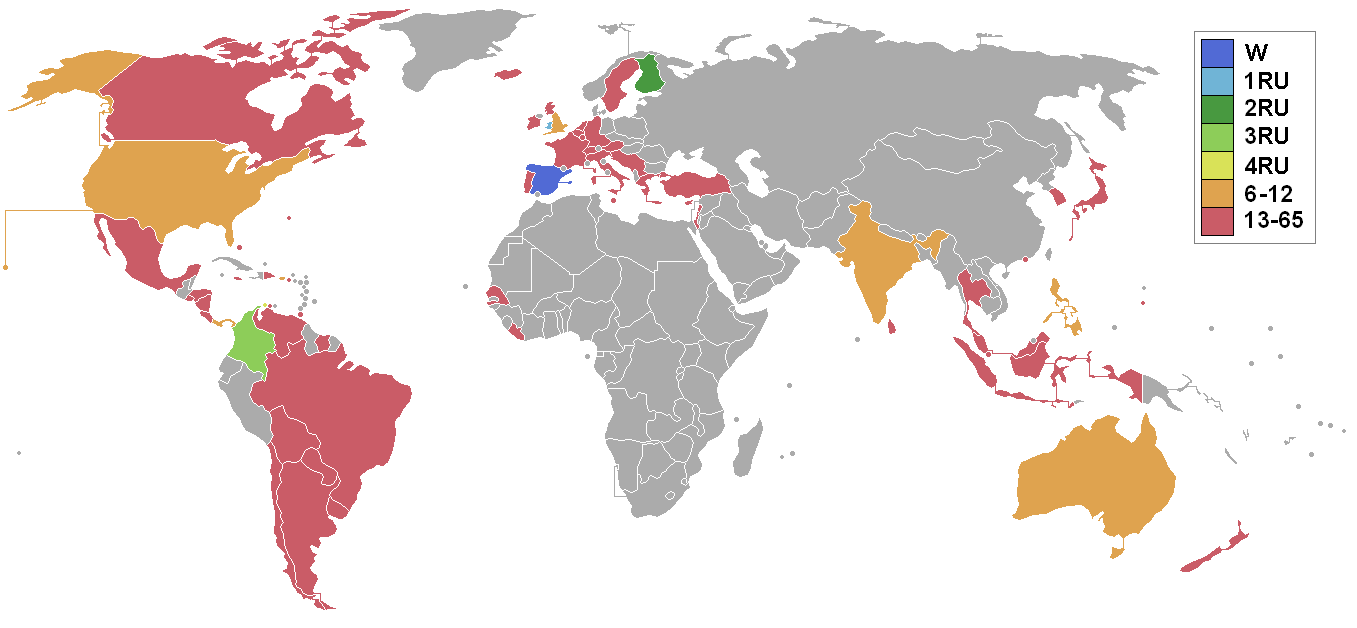
Miss Universe 1974 participating countries and territories

=== Placements ===
Placement	Contestant
Miss Universe 1974	Spain – Amparo Muñoz
1st Runner-Up	Wales – Helen Morgan
2nd Runner-Up	Finland – Johanna Raunio
3rd Runner-Up	Colombia – Ella Escandon
4th Runner-Up	Aruba – Maureen Vieira
Top 12	Australia – Yasmin Nagy; England – Kathleen Anders; India – Shailini Dholakia; Panama – Jazmine Panay; Philippines – Guadalupe Sanchez; Puerto Rico – Sonia María Stege; United States – Karen Morrison

=== Special awards ===
Award	Contestant
Miss Photogenic	Finland – Johanna Raunio
Miss Amity	Iceland – Anna Bjornsdóttir
Best National Costume	South Korea – Jae-kyu Kim

== Pageant ==
=== Format ===
Same with 1971, twelve semi-finalists were chosen at the preliminary competition that consists of the swimsuit and evening gown competition. The twelve semi-finalists participated in the casual interview, swimsuit, and evening gown competitions. From twelve, five finalists were shortlisted to advance to the final interview.

=== Selection committee ===
- Dana Andrews – American actor
- Peggy Fleming – American figure skater
- José Greco – Italian-born American dancer and choreographer
- Kiyoshi Hara – President of the ABC Japan network
- Aliza Kashi – Israeli singer
- Stirling Moss – British racing driver
- Carlos P. Romulo – then-Minister of Foreign Affairs of the Philippines
- Leslie Uggams – American actress and singer
- Edilson Cid Varela – Brazilian journalist
- Jerry West – American basketball player for the Los Angeles Lakers
- Earl Wilson – American columnist and journalist

== Contestants ==
Sixty-five contestants competed for the title.

Country/Territory	Contestant	Age (Note: Ages at the time of the pageant)	Hometown
Argentina	Leonor Celmira Guggini	23	Buenos Aires
Aruba	Maureen Vieira	18	Oranjestad
Australia	Yasmin Nagy	20	Oyster Bay
Austria	Eveline Engleder	20	Vienna
Bahamas	Agatha Watson	19	Nassau
Belgium	Anne-Marie Sikorski	21	Liège
Bermuda	Joyce De Rosa	22	Hamilton
Bolivia	Isabel Callaú	18	Santa Cruz de la Sierra
Brazil	Sandra Guimarães	18	São Paulo
Canada	Deborah Tone	21	Hamilton
Chile	Rebecca Gonzalez	20	Santiago
Colombia	Ella Escandon	20	Bucaramanga
Costa Rica	Rebeca Montagne	18	San José
Curaçao	Catherine De Jongh	18	Willemstad
Cyprus	Andri Tsangaridou	22	Famagusta
Dominican Republic	Jacqueline Cabrera	21	Santo Domingo
El Salvador	Ana Carlota Araujo	19	San Salvador
England	Kathleen Anders	23	Manchester
Finland	Johanna Raunio	21	Helsinki
France	Brigitte Flayac	19	Arcachon
Greece	Lena Kleopa	20	Athens
Guam	Elizabeth Tenorio	18	Hagåtña
Holland	Nicoline Broeckx	21	Maastricht
Honduras	Etelinda Mejia	18	El Progreso
Hong Kong	Jojo Cheung	21	Hong Kong
Iceland	Anna Bjornsdóttir	20	Reykjavík
India	Shailini Dholakia	20	Mumbai
Indonesia	Nia Kurniasih Ardikoesoema	25	Bandung
Ireland	Yvonne Costelloe	18	Dublin
Israel	Edna Levy	18	Ashkelon
Italy	Loretta Persichetti	21	Venice
Jamaica	Lennox Anne Black	18	Manchester
Japan	Eriko Tsuboi	20	Tokyo
Lebanon	Laudy Gabache	20	Beirut
Liberia	Maria Yatta Johnson	18	Monrovia
Luxembourg	Gisèle Azzeri	20	Pétange
Malaysia	Lily Chong	18	Johor
Malta	Josette Pace	19	Valletta
Mexico	Guadalupe Elorriaga	20	Mazatlán
New Zealand	Dianne Winyard	20	Wellington
Nicaragua	Francis Duarte	21	León
Panama	Jazmine Panay	19	Panama City
Paraguay	Maria Angela Medina	21	Asunción
Philippines	Guadalupe Sanchez	18	Manila
Portugal	Anna Paula Freitas	19	Lisbon
Puerto Rico	Sonia Stege	18	San Juan
Scotland	Catherine Robertson	24	Aberdeen
Senegal	Thioro Thiam	21	Dakar
Singapore	Angela Teo	19	Singapore
South Korea	Jae-kyu Kim	19	Seoul
Spain	Amparo Muñoz	20	Málaga
Sri Lanka	Melani Wijendra	23	Colombo
Suriname	Bernadette Werners	17	Paramaribo
Sweden	Eva Roempke	19	Linköping
Switzerland	Christine Lavanchy	20	Lausanne
Thailand	Benjamas Polpatpijarn	23	Bangkok
Trinidad and Tobago	Stephanie Lee Pack	18	Port of Spain
Turkey	Simiten Gakirgoz	21	Istanbul
United States	Karen Morrison	19	St. Charles
United States Virgin Islands	Thelma Santiago	18	St. Thomas
Uruguay	Mirta Rodriguez	18	Tacuarembó
Venezuela	Neyla Moronta	22	Maracaibo
Wales	Helen Morgan	22	Cardiff
West Germany	Ursula Faustle	18	Munich
Yugoslavia	Nada Jovanovsky	21	Belgrade
