= Unnur Steinsson =

Icelandic model and beauty pageant titleholder

Unnur Steinsson (born April 27, 1963) is an Icelandic model and beauty pageant titleholder who was crowned Miss Iceland 1983, competed in Miss Universe 1983, and came in the Top 7 position at the Miss World 1983. She is the mother of Unnur Birna Vilhjálmsdóttir, who won the Miss Iceland pageant in 2005 and became Miss World 2005.

Unnur was three months pregnant when she competed in the 1983 contest, which was strictly forbidden and could have led to disqualification. Her daughter, Unnur Birna, as mentioned, won the pageant 22 years later.

Preceded by Guðrún Möller	Miss Iceland; 1983	Succeeded by Berglind Johansen
