= Hafravatn =

Small lake on the eastern outskirts of Reykjavík, Iceland

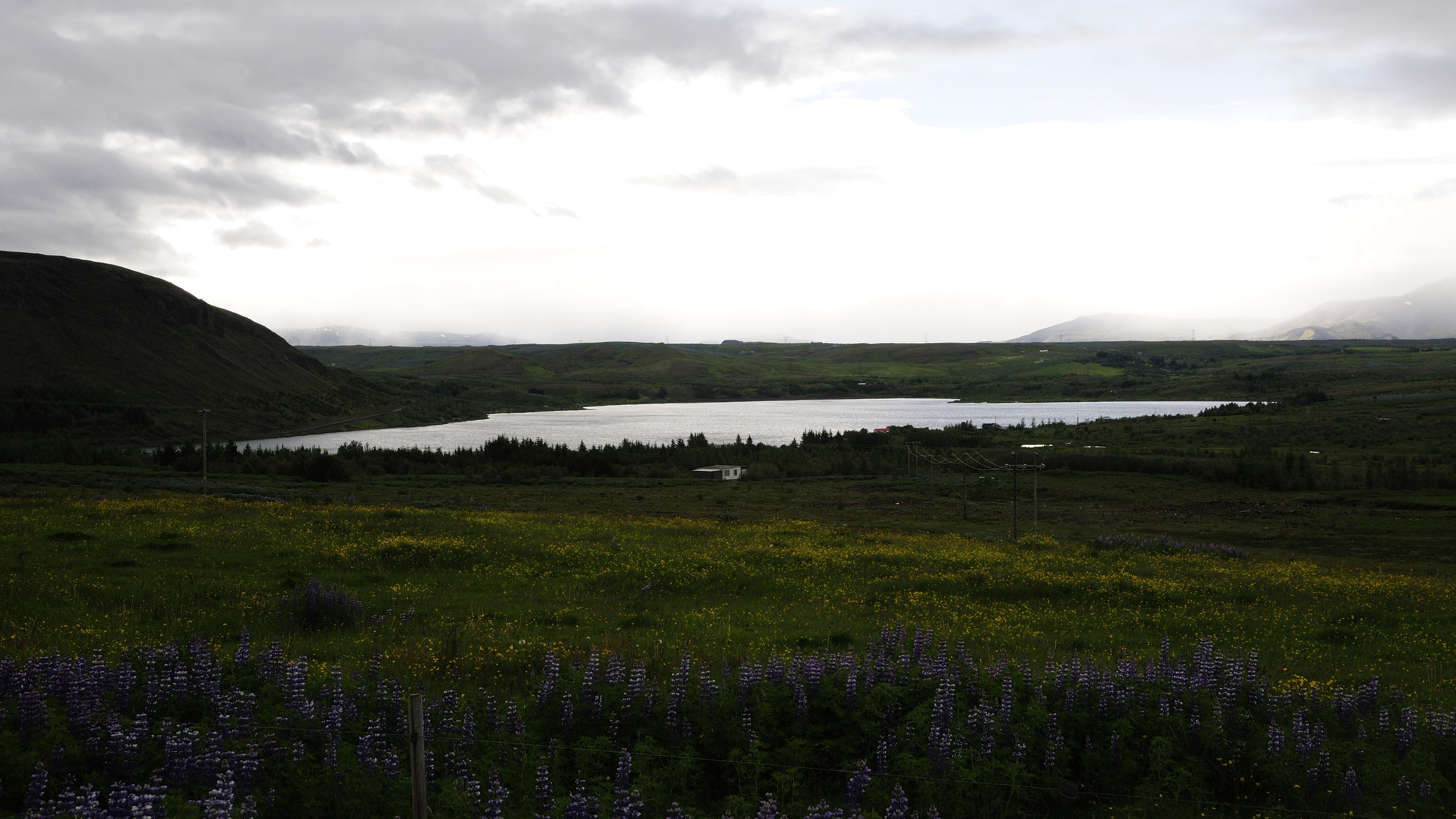

- Location within Iceland
- Coordinates: 64°07′50″N 21°39′44″W
- Primary inflows: Seljadalsá River
- Primary outflows: Úlfarsá
- Surface area: 1.08 km^{2} (0.42 sq mi)
- Average depth: 8.0 m (26.2 ft) (mean)
- Max. depth: 28 m (92 ft)

Hafravatn (Icelandic pronunciation: [ˈhavraˌvahtn̥]) is a small lake on the eastern outskirts of Reykjavík, Iceland. Located at 76 m above sea level, it has an area of 1.08 km^{2} (0.42 sq mi) with a greatest depth of 28 m (92 ft). The Seljadalsá River flows into it from the east and its discharge is Úlfarsá (into Korpúlfsstaðaá, also known as Ulfarsfellsa). A small village lies on the northern bank of the lake and a paragliding take-off point on its eastern side. The smaller lake of Langavatn lies to its southwest.
