= Birta Abiba Þórhallsdóttir =

Icelandic model and beauty queen

- Born: 1 September 2001 (age 25); Mosfellsbær, Iceland
- Occupation: Model
- Height: 1.77 m (5 ft 10 in)
- Beauty pageant titleholder
- Title: Miss Universe Iceland 2019
- Hair color: Black
- Eye color: Brown
- Major competitions: Miss Universe Iceland 2019 (Winner); Miss Universe 2019 (Top 10)

Birta Abiba Þórhallsdóttir (born 1 September 2001) is an Icelandic model and beauty pageant titleholder who was crowned Miss Universe Iceland 2019. She represented Iceland at Miss Universe 2019, where she placed in the top 10.

== Early life ==
Birta was born and raised in Mosfellsbær, a town just outside of Reykjavík. Her biological father is Congolese. Throughout her life, Birta was the victim of racism, having experienced violence and verbal abuse because of her skin color. Birta has worked for the International Red Cross study aid program, in an effort to encourage children's literacy and education abroad. As a teenager, Birta wrote a full-length novel.

== Pageantry ==
Birta represented Geysir at the Miss Universe Iceland 2019 which was held on 31 August 2019 at the Stapi Hall Hljómahöll in Njarðvík. She was one of the winners and was crowned as Miss Universe Iceland 2019, being crowned by outgoing titleholder Katrín Lea Elenudóttir. As Miss Universe Iceland, Þórhallsdóttir represented Iceland at the Miss Universe 2019 competition, where she placed in the top 10.

Awards and achievements
| Preceded by Katrín Lea Elenudóttir | Miss Universe Iceland; 2019 | Succeeded by Elísabet Hulda Snorradóttir |
