= Hildur María Leifsdóttir =

Iceland beauty queen and model

- Born: 21 October 1992 (age 33); Kópavogur, Iceland
- Height: 5 ft 6 in (1.68 m)
- Children: 1
- Beauty pageant titleholder
- Title: Miss Universe Iceland 2016
- Hair color: Blonde
- Eye color: Brown
- Major competitions: Miss Universe Iceland 2016 (Winner); Miss Universe 2016 (Unplaced)

Hildur María Leifsdóttir (born 21 October 1992) is an Icelandic model and beauty pageant titleholder who won Miss Universe Iceland 2016 and represented Iceland in Miss Universe 2016.

== Early and personal life ==
Hildur María was born and raised in Kópavogur, Iceland. She works for Icelandair as a flight attendant.

Maria is married to her husband Jakub and in February 2024, she gave birth to her first child, Lina.

== Pageantry ==
In 2013, Maria competed at Miss Iceland 2013 where she placed in the TOP 5. Three years later, on 12 September 2016, Hildur María won the title of Miss Universe Iceland 2016 and became the first representative from Iceland in Miss Universe since 2009. She competed at Miss Universe 2016 but was unplaced.

Awards and achievements
Preceded by Ingibjörg Egilsdóttir	Miss Universe Iceland; 2016	Succeeded by Arna Ýr Jónsdóttir
