= Miss Grand Tanzania =

National beauty pageant in Tanzania

- Established: 11 August 2017; 9 years ago
- Founder: Rasheedah Jamaldin
- Type: Beauty pageant
- Headquarters: Dar es Salaam
- Location: Tanzania
- Official language: Swahili and English
- President: Nazimizye Mdolo
- Parent organization: Avil and Minazi Entertainment Ltd. (2024–present)
- Affiliations: List of franchises: Miss Grand International; Miss Earth; Miss Cosmo; Miss Tourism Africa; Miss Africa International; Miss Elite

Miss Grand Tanzania is a Tanzanian national beauty pageant whose winner represents the country at its international parent pageant, Miss Grand International. First established in 2017 by Dar es Salaam-based legal counsel Rasheedah Jamaldin, the license has since changed hands several times, including a lapse from 2019 to 2023 before being revived in 2024 under its current president, Nazimizye Mdolo.

Tanzania's best result at Miss Grand International to date came in 2025, when Beatrice Alex Akyoo placed fifth runner-up; its 2018 representative, Queen Mugesi Ainory Gesase, had earlier placed among the top 10 in the national costume sub-contest, one of the pageant's main preliminary events. Since 2024, the organization has also appointed its runners-up to represent Tanzania at other international pageants, including Miss Cosmo, Miss Earth, Miss Africa International, and Miss Tourism Africa.

== History ==
Tanzania made its debut at Miss Grand International in 2014 with Lorraine Marriot, appointed under the direction of Veronika Rovegno, a businessperson based in Dar es Salaam. The following year, Jinah Dameckh, second runner-up at Miss Tanzania 2014, was appointed to represent the country at the 2015 international edition but withdrew for undisclosed reasons.

After two consecutive years of absence, Tanzania returned to the competition when a group of local organizers—including Swahili Studios, Merry Bright Beauty Point, City Star Boutique, and Infinity Lounge—purchased the franchise for 2017–2018, with legal counsel Rasheedah Jamaldin serving as director. Under Rasheedah's directorship, the first Miss Grand Tanzania pageant was held in Dar es Salaam on 11 August 2017, featuring twenty-eight national finalists, from whom model Batuli Mohamed was named the winner. The final competition was attended by Miss Grand International 2016 Ariska Putri Pertiwi, and the vice president of the international organization, Teresa Chaivisut.

In 2018, the licensee initially intended to run the pageant from the community to the national level, but the competition was canceled and that year's titleholder was appointed instead. After that, the contract between the international organization and the Tanzanian organizers was not renewed, and no Tanzanian candidate competed at the international event from 2019 to 2023. This continued until 2024, when Nazimizye Mdolo, former Miss Africa International 2023, acquired the license and organized the second national edition on 31 August 2024.

== Editions ==
The following is a list of editions of the Miss Grand Tanzania pageant, which has been held as a stand-alone competition since 2017.

Edition	Date	Final venue	Entrants	Winner	Ref.
1st	11 August 2017	Dar es Salaam Convention Center	28	Batuli Mohamed	
2nd	31 August 2024	Warehouse Arena Masaki, Dar es Salaam	15	Fatma Suleiman	
3rd	16 August 2025	The Super Dome, Masaki, Dar es Salaam	24	Beatrice Alex	
4th	8 August 2026	The Super Dome, Masaki, Dar es Salaam	25	Jihan Dimack	

Winners gallery

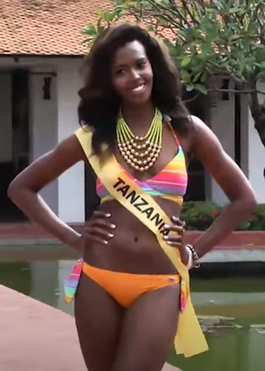
Lorraine Marriot (2014)

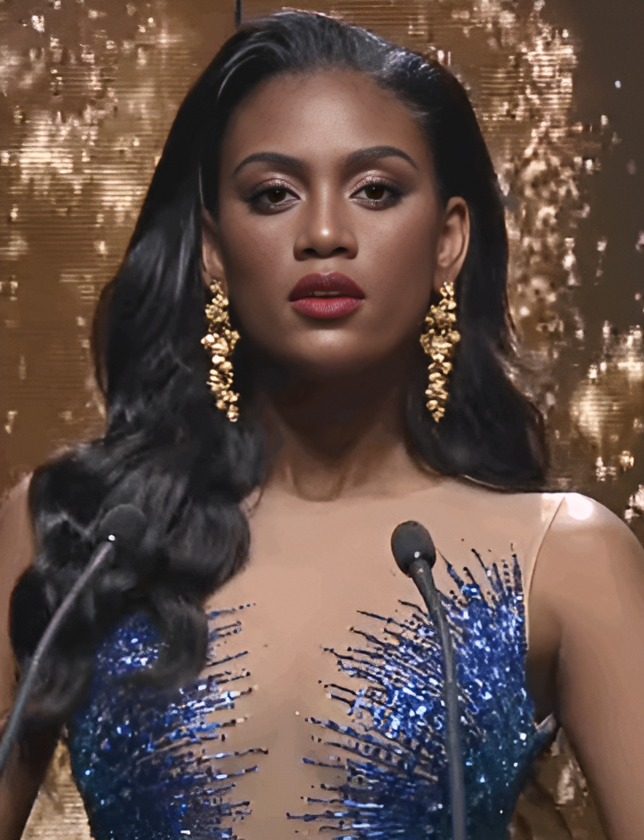
Fatma Suleiman (2024)

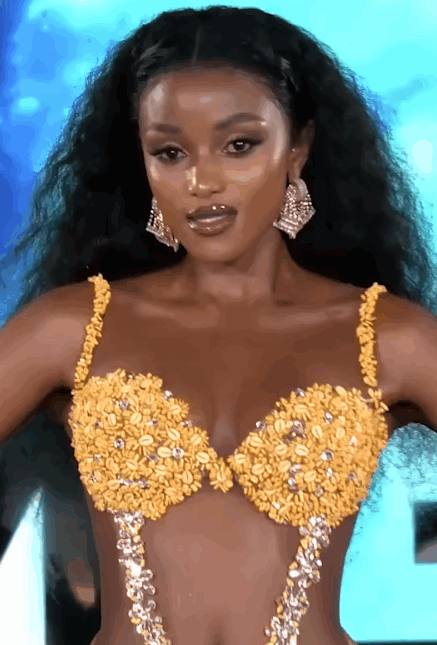
Beatrice Alex Akyoo (2025)

Jihan Dimack (2026)

== International competition ==
=== Miss Grand International ===
Year	Representative	Original national title (Note: Title directly obtained via the national pageant)	Competition performance		National director	Ref.
Year	Representative	Original national title	Placements	Other award	National director	Ref.
2014	Lorraine Marriot	Appointed	Unplaced	—	Veronika Rovegno	
2015	Jihan Dimack	2nd runner-up Miss Tanzania 2014	Unable to compete		Hashim Lundenga	
2016	No representative					
2017	Batuli Mohamed	Miss Grand Tanzania 2017	Unplaced	—	Rasheedah Jamaldin	
2018	Queen Mugesi Ainory Gesase	Appointed	Unplaced	Top 10 – Best National Costume	Rasheedah Jamaldin	
2019 – 2023: No representatives
2024	Fatma Suleiman	Miss Grand Tanzania 2024	Unplaced	—	Nazimizye Mdolo	
2025	Beatrice Alex Akyoo	Miss Grand Tanzania 2025	5th runner-up	—	Nazimizye Mdolo	
2026	Jihan Dimack	Miss Grand Tanzania 2026	Miss Grand International 2026		Nazimizye Mdolo	

=== Other pageants ===
Starting in 2024, the pageant organizer also named the Miss Grand Tanzania's vice queens to represent Tanzania in a number of international pageants.

Year	Representative	National qualification	International competition			Ref.
Year	Representative	National qualification	Pageant	Placement	Special award	Ref.
2024	Lujeyn Ahmed	Miss Cosmo Tanzania 2024 (Note: Supplemental titles at the Miss Grand Tanzania 2024 pageant.)	Miss Cosmo 2024	Unplaced	People's Choice Award (Note: National Pride category)	
2024	Sharon Julius Ndasala	Miss Africa International Tanzania 2024	Miss Africa International 2024	1st runner-up	—	
2025	Amina Jigge	Miss Earth Tanzania 2025 (Note: Supplemental titles at the Miss Grand Tanzania 2025 pageant.)	Miss Earth 2025	Unplaced	—	
2025	Jesca Michael Micca	Miss Cosmo Tanzania 2025	Miss Cosmo 2025	Unplaced		
2025	Jeniffer Shirima	Miss Africa International Tanzania 2025	Miss Africa International 2025	1st runner-up	Best National Costume; Best Talent	
2025	Adelina Mpinga	Miss Tourism Tanzania 2025	Miss Tourism Africa 2025	Top 10	—	
2025	Efrazia Makene	Miss Elite Tanzania 2025	Miss International 2025	Unplaced		
2025	Faidha Kassim	Miss Intercontinental Tanzania 2025	Miss Intercontinental 2025	3rd runner-up	Miss Public Choice	
2026	Prisca Lyimo	Miss Cosmo Tanzania 2026 (Note: Supplemental title at the Miss Grand Tanzania 2026 pageant)	Miss Cosmo 2026			
2026	Celine Edison	Miss Earth Tanzania 2026	Miss Earth 2026			
2026	Agape Anthony	Miss International Tanzania 2026	Miss International 2026			
2026	Rose Usio	Miss Global Tanzania 2026	Miss Global 2026	Top 12	Best National Costume	
2026	Janeth Anselme	Miss Intercontinental Tanzania 2026	Miss Intercontinental 2026			
2026	Zulfa Yazid	Miss Africa Golden Tanzania 2026	Miss Africa Golden International 2026			
2026	Eve Godwin	Miss Africa International Tanzania 2026	Miss Africa International 2026			
2026	Aurely Mkonda	Miss Tourism Africa International Tanzania 2026	Miss Tourism Africa International 2026			
2026	Sharon Julius	Appointment	Miss Elite 2026			

== See also ==
- Miss World Tanzania
