= Collete Nwadike =

Nigerian model

Collette Nwadike
- Born: 6 April 1991 (age 35); Makurdi, Benue State, Nigeria
- Education: Nnamdi Azikiwe University, Awka
- Occupations: Model, beauty queen, actress, TV series producer
- Height: 175 cm (69 in)
- Beauty pageant titleholder
- Title: Exquisite Face of the Universe; Ex Miss Tourism Nigeria; SA on Tourism to Governor (Chief) Willie Obiano of Anambra State
- No. of films: 3
- Years active: 2009-present
- Hair color: Black
- Eye color: Dark brown

Collette Nwadike (born Collete Kosisochukwu Barbara, 6 April 1991) is a Nigerian model, former beauty queen and Nollywood actress. She represented Nigeria in the Exquisite Face of the Universe Pageant in Sao Tome and emerged winner, becoming the first African to do so. In 2014 she was the winner of Miss Tourism Nigeria. One month after her victory on a courtesy visit, she was appointed S.A to the Governor of Anambra State Chief Willie Obiano where she served for eight years (2014–2022) She is a representative of the Miss Tourism Nigeria brand. In 2025 she was appointed Chief Executive Officer of the Miss Tourism Nigeria Organization.

== Early life ==
Collette was born on 6 April 1991 to Mr. & Mrs. Simon and Angelina Nwadike in Makurdi, the capital city of Benue State, north-central region of Nigeria. She has five sisters and a brother, and she is the last daughter and second to last child. Although a native of Nise in Awka-South Local Government Area of Anambra State, southeastern region of Nigeria, Nwadike grew up in Makurdi in the middle belt of Nigeria, where she did her primary and junior secondary education before moving to Lagos to complete her senior secondary school.

In an interview with Nwadike, she said: "As a young girl growing up, I was always seeing myself as a [beauty] queen when I was three. I kept on looking up to people like Bianca Odumegwu-Ojukwu, Regina Askia-Williams. I saw how beautiful they were and how glamorous they looked. I thought of being like these people someday! This is a dream I've had for a long time. And it's like I'm living my dreams now." Even as a child she had the ambition of becoming a beauty queen; she was called princess among family and friends. She was inspired in 2001 after watching Agbani Darego.

== Education ==
Collette went to God's Heritage Nursery and Primary School, Makurdi, Benue State (1993-1995) and Holy Ghost Nursery and Primary School, Makurdi, Benue State in 2000. She later proceeded to Anglican Secondary School, Makurdi, Benue State from 2001 to 2006 and completed her O'Level in Caro Secondary School, Olodi-Apapa, Lagos State. At the age of 16 in 2007, she got admitted into Nnamdi Azikiwe University, Awka, where she studied English and literature under the tutelage of professors Joy Chinwe Eyisi and Rems Umeasiegbu as her notable lecturers.

In an interview with Collette Nwadike regarding her choice of course she studied in the university, she said, "I got the form myself and I actually filled in English Language and Literature for the first time but when it didn't work out, I got another form and filled in the same course the second time. My interest in English is really in literature. I love reading books and that was one of the reasons I went for literature as a course. I'm really interested in Nigerian literature."

== Career ==
=== Modeling and pageantry ===
Before becoming beauty queen, Nwadike has auditioned and participated in different modelling contests and has been featured in various shows. She works with some talented and well known fashion designers and stylists in Nigeria. Nwadike has judged numerous pageants, and fashion and modeling competitions including Miss Tourism Nigeria 2015 and Mr. Universe Nigeria 2015.

Collette Nwadike has contested in different beauty pageants such as Miss Global Nigeria and Miss Earth Nigeria, where she was a runner up. In 2014, Nwadike was crowned Miss Tourism Nigeria, held in May at Lagos State, southwest Nigeria. She represented Anambra State, among other 35 contestants representing their states. After a series of screenings, Nwadike was crowned the Pageant Queen that night; her eyes were filled with tears of joy. A month after being crowned Miss Tourism 2015, she went for a courtesy visit to meet the Governor of Anambra State Chief Willie Obiano. They went for a tour around the state to see the different tourist sights. On her visit she was announced Senior Adviser to the Governor on tourism. Ever since then, Nwadike has been working with the State Government while participating in her other career.

In December 2015, she represented Nigeria in Exquisite Face of the Universe held in Sao Tome and Principe, which involved over 50 contestants from different countries of the world. she emerged victorious and brought home the crown making her the first black woman to ever win the title.

=== Acting ===
She has worked with different veteran film makers in Nollywood such as Obi Emelonye, Ikechukwu Onyenka, Kasvid Movies, SimonPeaceMaker, Ndave David Njoku etc. She is the CEO of ScreenGoddessGlobalProductions and successful completed of a movie series title African Beauty yet to be displayed on screens. She has so far written and produced a 30-episode series, African Beauty as well as a feature film, The Oblivion.

=== Filmography ===
TV Series		
Title	Producer	Director
The Calabash	Obi Emelonye	
Single's Diary	Crey Ahanonu	Simon Peacemaker
African Beauty	Collette Nwadike/Ndave Njoku	Ikechukwu Onyenka
Movies		
Title	Producer	Director
Royal Mission	Chijioke Nneji of Magic Movies	Caz Chidiebere
Chase	Simon Peacemaker	
O42	Caz Chidiebere	
Music videos		
Title	Artists	Director
Bonny and Clyde	Percy ft Solidstar	Unlimited L.A

=== Service to the Anambra State (2014–2022) ===
In 2014, shortly after winning Miss Tourism Nigeria, Nwadike was appointed Special Assistant on Tourism to the Anambra State Government under Governor Chief Dr. Willie Obiano. she served for 8 years making her the longest-serving tourism aides in Anambra State

During her eight-year tenure, she:

- Contributed to policy direction for tourism growth and destination branding
- Developed cultural showcase programs highlighting Anambra heritage
- Facilitated creative collaborations across entertainment, arts, and media
- Represented the state at tourism events locally and internationally
- Strengthened youth involvement in cultural projects
- Played advisory roles in festival planning, tourism promotions, and cultural diplomacy

== Setbacks and success ==
As a child she admired many beautiful models and actresses with glamorous dress and attires. She went for her first ever modeling beauty pageant contest where she participated in the 2010 Miss National Association of Students of English and Literary Studies (NASELS), Unizik Chapter, but failed. Then she was in her first year in the university. She further went ahead to contest for Miss (UNIZIK) Nnamdi Azikiwe University and failed. She thought to try pageant out of school competitions and went for the Most Beautiful Girl in Nigeria (MBGN) pageant, but unfortunately she didn't even make it pass the auditions. She made it through the Port Harcourt audition but stopped in Lagos. But she didn't back down, she went for Miss Earth Nigeria, where she got into camp in Lekki, Lagos and she did well in camp though she didn't emerge one of the runners-up. The event was held at "Incubator". She was awarded Miss Earth Photogenic. Her race to becoming beauty queen continued in 2012 when she competed for the Miss Global Nigeria pageant. She was strengthened by the support of her mum and realized she couldn't stop, wanting to bring happiness and achieving her dreams. She contested for the Most Beautiful Girl in Abuja and emerged Second Runner-up in 2013. In 2014, she saw the Miss Tourism Nigeria pageant on the Internet. She auditioned in Owerri, Imo State. She then represented Anambra State. The event was scheduled on 17 May 2014 and was held at Ruby Gardens.
