= Miss Grand Tanzania 2025 =

3rd Miss Grand Tanzania competition

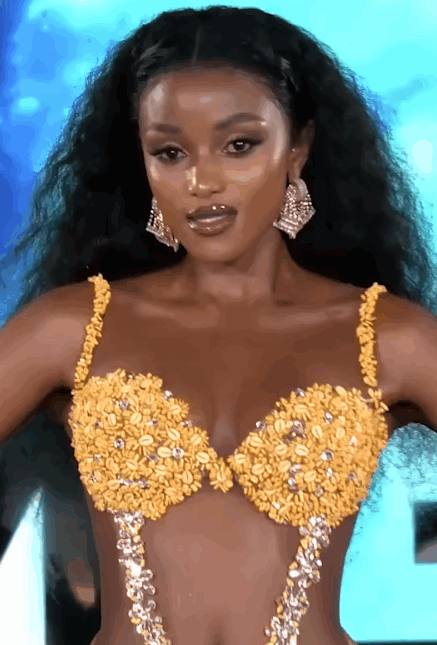
- Beatrice Alex Akyoo
- Date: 16 August 2025
- Entertainment: Zuchu; Barnaba Classic
- Venue: The Super Dome, Masaki, Dar es Salaam
- Broadcaster: YouTube
- Entrants: 24
- Placements: 12
- Winner: Beatrice Alex (Dar es Salaam)
- People Choice: Jesca Michael Micca (Tabora)

External videos
- Miss Grand Tanzania 2025 Finals
- 2025 Miss Grand Tanzania Finals by Avil and Minazi Entertainment

Miss Grand Tanzania 2025 was the 3rd Miss Grand Tanzania pageant, held on 16 August 2025 at the Super Dome Masaki in Dar es Salaam. Contestants from 24 regions of the country, who qualified for the national finals via an audition contest held at the Warehouse Arena Masaki in Dar es Salaam on 24 May 2025, competed for the title. The event also featured live performances of two Tanzanian singers, Zuchu and Barnaba Classic.

The contest was won by a 25-year-old Arts and Design graduate, Beatrice Alex, representing the Dar es Salaam Region. Beatrice was crowned by the outgoing Miss Grand Tanzania 2024 Fatma Suleiman, and then represented Tanzania internationally at the Miss Grand International 2025, held in Thailand on 18 October 2025, and was named the 5th runner-up.

In addition to the Miss Grand title, the country representatives for Miss Earth 2025, Miss Cosmo 2025, Miss Intercontinental 2025, and others were also determined at the event. The panel of judges included Nazimizye Mdolo as pageant director, Miss Grand Tanzania 2017 Batuli Mohamed, Miss Grand Tanzania 2018 Queen Mugesi, 1st runner-up Miss Landscape International 2019 Anitha Mlay, Adam Kundya, Jackson Michael, and Frank Adrian.

== Results ==
Miss Grand Tanzania 2025 competition result by region
Color key:
Main winner	Supplemental winners
Top 12	Unplaced
Withdrawals	No representative

Placement	Delegate
Miss Grand Tanzania 2025	Dar es Salaam – Beatrice Alex
Miss Earth Tanzania 2025	Mwanza – Amina Jigge
Miss Cosmo Tanzania 2025	Tabora – Jesca Michael Micca
Miss Intercontinental Tanzania 2025	Simiyu – Faidha Kassim
Miss Elite Tanzania 2025	Kagera – Efrazia Makene
Miss Africa International Tanzania 2025	Rukwa – Jeniffer Shirima
Miss Tourism International Tanzania 2025	Singida – Adelina Mpinga
Top 12	Geita – Lilian Moses; Katavi – Yvonne Paul-Cerestini; Manyara – Lissa Othman; Pwani – Neysha Matile; Shinyanga – Jenifer Temba

== Contestants ==
The following contestants have been confirmed.

- Arusha – Shannon Rothbletz
- Dar es Salaam – Beatrice Alex
- Dodoma – Winnie Bernard
- Geita – Lilian Moses
- Iringa – Hellen Kaaya
- Kagera – Efrazia Makene
- Katavi – Yvonne Paul-Cerestini
- Kigoma – Muthon Paul Chagonja
- Kilimanjaro – Precious Tarimo
- Lindi – Angelina Edgar Raymond
- Manyara – Lissa Othman
- Mara – Anneth Daniels
- Mbeya – Beatrice Malale
- Morogoro – Agape Anthony
- Mtwara – Elizabeth Edward
- Mwanza – Amina Jigge
- Pwani – Neysha Matile
- Rukwa – Jeniffer Shirima
- Ruvuma – Maryah Joseph Peter (withdrew)
- Shinyanga – Jenifer Temba
- Simiyu – Faidha Kassim
- Singida – Adelina Mpinga
- Songwe – Mashavu Mwaruka
- Tabora – Jesca Michael Micca
- Tanga – Raudhat Khamis
