= Miss Tourism Nigeria =

- Type: Beauty Pageant
- Parent organization: Qhue Concepts
- Headquarters: Lagos, Nigeria
- First edition: 2012; 14 years ago
- Most recent edition: 2023
- Current titleholder: Joy Ebere, Abia State
- Chief Executive Officer: Seth Santiago Roberts
- Language: English
- Website: Official Website

Miss Tourism Nigeria is a Nigerian beauty pageant aimed at supporting today's women through its passion for pageantry with a purpose. The winner of Miss Tourism Nigeria represents Nigeria at Miss Tourism World while the runner up represents Nigeria at the Miss Tourism Africa.

Miss Tourism Nigeria based in Lagos Nigeria was established in 2012 By The Qhue Concepts Group. The pageant has been aired on NTA, Plus TV and AMC Channel on StarTimes.

In 2024 Miss Tourism Nigeria emerged best female pageant brand of the year at the Eko Heritage awards.

The Current titleholder is Joy Ebere.

== Competition ==
The competition begins with an open registration process, where applicants are shortlisted through interviews and other evaluative factors to determine the top 37 semi-finalists. These semi-finalists undergo a series of tasks designed to test various facets of their skills and abilities. Following each task, contestants face eliminations until a select number of finalists (usually ranging from 10 to 20) remains. These finalists then proceed to a camp for the final round of the competition, culminating in the grand finale where one contestant is ultimately crowned the winner

As at 2024, the winner receives a grand prize of 10 million Naira, a brand new car and rights to represent Nigeria at Miss World Tourism competition in Colombo, China

== History ==
Miss Tourism Nigeria, founded by Seth Santiago Roberts was officially created in 2012 and held its first edition in 2014. The maiden edition concluded with Tomi Salami from Kwara State being crowned the winner.

The organization has recognized several young women, some of whom have gone on to achieve notable accomplishments at both national and international levels.

== Titleholders ==
List of winners of Miss Tourism Nigeria since its inception
Year	Winner	State	Ref(s)
2012	Tomi Salami	Kwara State	
2013	Jennifer Igwegbe	Anambra State	
2014	Collete Nwadike	Anambra State	
2015	Ifeoma Sharon Anya	Anambra State	
2016	Ogenna Ekwubiri	Abia State	
2017	Chiamaka Chinwuko	Anambra State	
2018	Chisom Francisca Agu	Enugu State	
2019	Yetunde Barnabas	Kogi State	
2020	Prisca Nwaobodo	Delta State	
2021	Adeduro Tosin Adetola	Ondo State	
2023	Joy Ebere Ekekwe	Abia State	
