= Reginald Mengi =

Tanzanian billionaire and businessman (c.1943–2019)

Reginald A. Mengi

Personal details
- Born: 29 May 1943 Kilimanjaro Region, Tanganyika Territory
- Died: 2 May 2019 (aged 75) Dubai, UAE
- Resting place: Machame, Kilimanjaro Region
- Spouse(s): Mercy Anne Mengi (m. 1971, div 2015) Jacqueline Mengi (m. 2016; died 2019)
- Children: 5
- Occupation: Businessman, Media mogul, Philanthropist

Reginald Abraham Mengi (c.1943 – May 2, 2019) was a Tanzanian billionaire, businessperson, philanthropist, and author of the book I Can, I Must, I Will.

Reginald Abraham Mengi was born into a poor family in Northern Tanzania and raised in a mud hut which the family shared with cows, sheep, goats and chickens. He had one meal a day and sometimes none at all and walked to school barefoot. Notwithstanding these circumstances he managed to study accountancy and articles with Cooper Brothers in the United Kingdom and after being accepted as a member of the Institute of Chartered Accountants of England and Wales, he returned to Tanzania in 1971 and was employed by the accounting firm of Coopers & Lybrand Tanzania. He stayed with Coopers & Lybrand Tanzania (now PriceWaterHouseCoopers) up to September 1989 during which time he became its Chairman and Managing Partner. In October 1989 Dr. Mengi left Coopers & Lybrand Tanzania to concentrate on his own businesses. Today his flagship IPP Limited and its associated companies rank amongst the largest private companies in Tanzania . His media empire included ITV, one of the first private television stations in Tanzania. He was the Chairman of Tanzania Private Sector Foundation (TPSF), Confederation of Tanzania Industries, IPP Gold Ltd., Media Owners Association of Tanzania, Executive Chairman & Owner at IPP Ltd. (Tanzania) and Chairman of Handeni Gold, Inc. Mengi had an estimated net worth of US$560 million as per Forbes richest people in Africa 2014.

== Honors and awards ==
Mengi has received the following awards:

- 2000–2003 – Most Respected CEO East Africa Community (EAC)
- 2008 – Martin Luther King Drum Major for Justice Award
- 2010 – Global Leadership and Humanitarian Award
- 2012 – United Nations NGO Lifetime Achievement Award
- 2012 – The Oslo Business for Peace Award
- 2012 – Honorary Doctor of Humanity Degree Award
- 2014 – International Order of the Lions Award
- 2014 – Business Leader of the Year Award
- 2019 – Award winner of Appreciation from PRINCEmosha BRAND
