= Miss Grand Tanzania 2024 =

2nd edition of the Miss Grand Tanzania competition

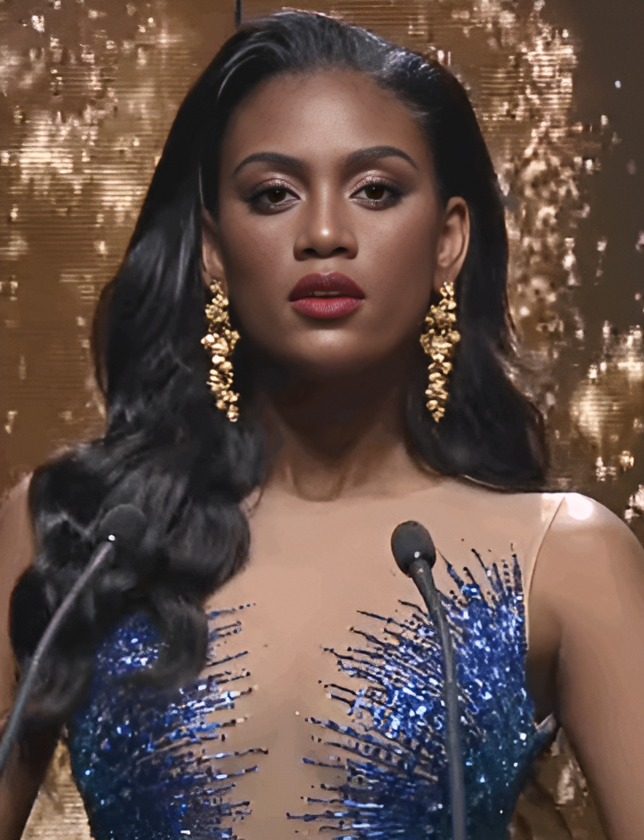
- Fatma Suleiman, the winner of the contest
- Date: August 31, 2024
- Presenters: Deogratius Kithama
- Entertainment: Nandy
- Venue: Warehouse Arena Masaki, Dar es Salaam
- Broadcaster: Azam TV Channel 413 (ZamaradiTV)
- Entrants: 15
- Placements: 10
- Winner: Fatma Suleiman

External videos
- Miss Grand Tanzania 2024 Finals
- 2024 Miss Grand Tanzania Finals by Avil and Minazi Entertainment

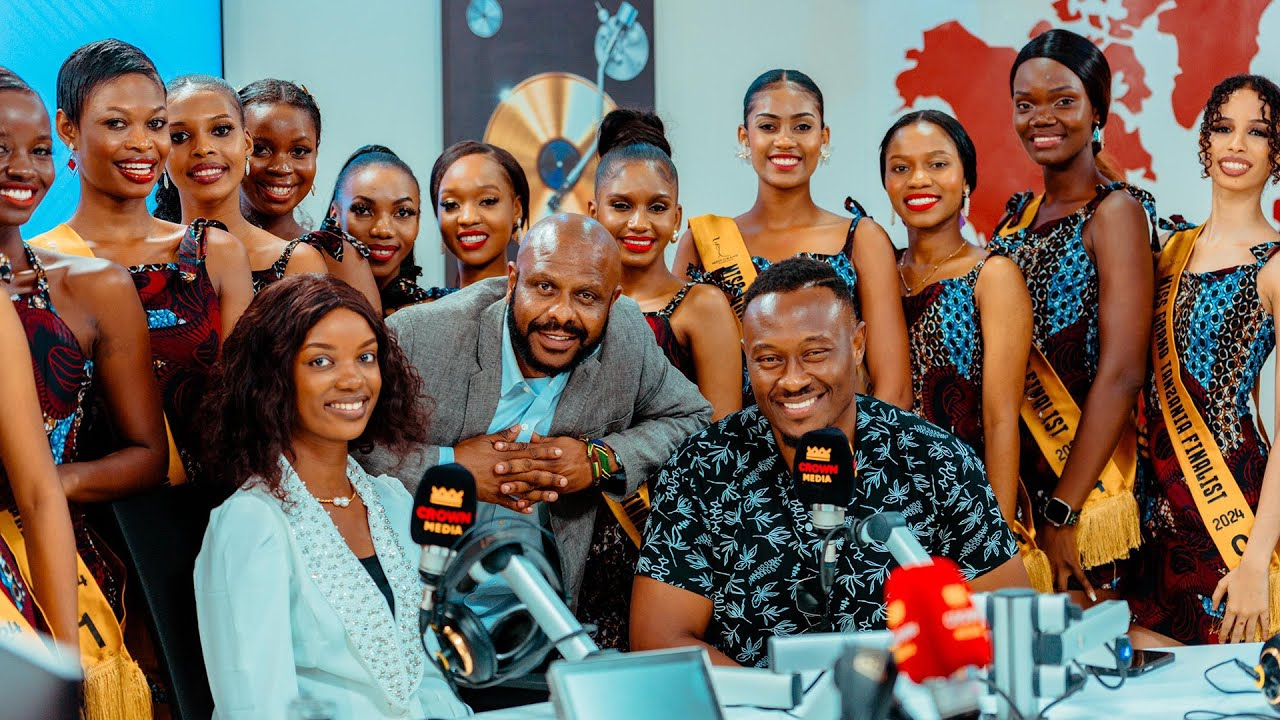
Miss Grand Tanzania 2024 candidates visit Crown FM 92.1 headquarter on August 29, 2024.

Miss Grand Tanzania 2024 was the 2nd edition of the Miss Grand Tanzania pageant, held in Dar es Salaam on August 31, 2024, at the Warehouse Arena Masaki. Fifteen contestants competed for the title. Of whom, a 23-year-old medical student, Fatma Suleiman, was announced the winner. Fatma represented Tanzania at Miss Grand International 2024 competition, in MGI Hall, Bangkok, Thailand in October 25 but she was unplaced.

In addition to the main winner, the country representatives for other 2024 international contests, including Miss Cosmo and Miss Africa International, were also determined.

The event featured a live performance by a Tanzanian singer, Nandy, and was live transmitted to audiences nationwide via television partner, ZamaradiTV, on Azam TV Channel 413.

== Background ==
After five consecutive years of absence from the Miss Grand International pageant, the license of Miss Grand Tanzania was purchased by Nazimizye Mdolo of Avil and Minazi Entertainment in 2024. At the press conferences held on June 6, Nazimizye stated that the contestants' eligibility deadline for the pageant was set for June 31, with the grand finale on August 31, at the Warehouse Arena Masaki. Fifteen finalists were elected to compete.

The panel of judges in the grand final round includes:

- Halima Kopwe – Miss Tanzania 2024
- Rosey Manfere – Miss Tanzania 2020
- Martin Kadinda – Fashion designer
- Lorraine Marriot – Miss Grand Tanzania 2014 and Miss Universe Tanzania 2015

== Results ==
| Placement | Delegate |
|---|---|
| Miss Grand Tanzania 2024 | 05. – Fatma Suleiman |
| Miss Cosmo Tanzania 2024 | 09. – Lujeyn Ahmed |
| Miss Africa International Tanzania 2024 | 07. – Sharon Julius Ndasala |
| 1st runner-up | 06. – Jackline J. Kagila |
| 2nd runner-up | 11. – Jeniffer Augustine Shirima |
| Top 10 | 01. – Agapa Mwazembe; 02. – Anneth Daniel Ndayanse; 08. – Vanessa Gold Makange; 12. – Beatrice Devis Olangu; 13. – Elizabeth Petro |
Special awards
| Miss Popularity | 02. – Anneth Daniel Ndayanse |
| Best in Swimsuit | 05. – Fatma Suleiman |

== Contestants ==
Fifteen contestants competed for the title.

| No. | Candidate | Age (Note: Ages at the time of the pageant) | Ref. |
|---|---|---|---|
| 01. | Agapa Mwazembe | 24 | |
| 02. | Anneth Daniel Ndayanse | 21 | |
| 03. | Madinah Kulwa Simba | 23 | |
| 04. | Irene Godfrey | 23 | |
| 05. | Fatima Suleiman | 23 | |
| 06. | Jackline J. Kagila | 20 | |
| 07. | Sharon Julius Ndasala | 22 | |
| 08. | Vanessa Gold Makange | 19 | |
| 09. | Lujeyn Ahmed | 18 | |
| 10. | Vanessa Julius Mziray | 23 | |
| 11. | Jeniffer Augustine Shirima | 20 | |
| 12. | Beatrice Devis Olangu | 22 | |
| 13. | Elizabeth Petro | 23 | |
| 14. | Caren Peter Magembe | 21 | |
| 15. | Elsie Grace Bernad Mbwambo | 23 | |
