= Seth Santiago Roberts =

- Born: Seth Santiago Roberts; Accra, Ghana
- Other name: Seth Roberts
- Education: Nigerian institute of journalism
- Occupations: Entrepreneur; Communication expert
- Known for: Founder of Qhue Concept

Seth Santiago Roberts is a Nigerian Entrepreneur and communication expert. He is the founder and chief executive officer of Qhue Concept which is the parent company for international brands; Miss Tourism Africa, Mister Tourism Africa International, Miss Grand Nigeria, Miss Tourism Nigeria, Miss Cosmo Nigeria, Mr Universe Nigeria and the Men's Fashion week Nigeria.

In 2022, he was a recipient of a Forty Under Forty Africa award under the category of beauty and lifestyle.

== Background and education ==
Roberts was born to a Ghanaian-Bahamian father and a Nigerian-Ghanaian mother. He grew up in Ghana and moved to Nigeria when he was sixteen after his Junior Secondary school education in Accra, Ghana. He was then enrolled into C.M.S secondary school, Bariga.

He proceeded to obtain a degree from the Nigerian institute of journalism.

== Career ==
Roberts began his career as an intern at the Nigerian Television Authority, he was later offered a contract staff position where he worked actively as a production assistant, assistant producer, grew to become producer-presenter and then associate producer and director of some major shows on NTA all within 2002 to 2007.

From 2007 to 2010, he worked as a creative director for Linda Ikeji's Blackdove Media. He Produced the Style Night Fashion Show which became the annual event on the Nigerian Entertainment and fashion Calendar. He later became the managing director of the F.M & B magazine.

Roberts established the Qhue concept group in 2011. According to him it was established in response to a growing demand for creative, informative and effective communication and events production as well as management.

He started the Miss Tourism Nigeria and Mr. Universe Nigeria brands in 2012, he has so far hosted twelve editions.

In 2015, he registered the Miss Tourism Africa brand and the Men's Fashion Week Nigeria in 2018 with its debut edition in the same year while the Miss Tourism Africa debut its maiden edition in 2022.

Roberts currently sits as National Director for Miss Grand Nigeria, Miss Cosmo Nigeria, Miss Eco Nigeria, Miss Eco Teen Nigeria and Miss Tourism World Nigeria. In 2024, he acquired an international franchise with Miss Grand International and Miss Eco International, granting him rights to produce delegates to represent Nigeria at the global stage.

== Awards and recognitions ==
In 2022, he was listed among the Forty Under Forty Africa awards under the category of beauty and lifestyle.
