= Nancy Sumari =

Tanzanian author, business woman and social entrepreneur

- Born: Nancy Abraham Sumari; 7 August 1986 (age 40); Arusha, Tanzania
- Education: University College London, UCL; University of Dar Es Salaam; Lehigh University
- Occupations: Beauty Pageant Winner; Author; Entrepreneur; Global Shaper
- Spouse: Luca Neghesti
- Children: Zuri Neghesti
- Beauty pageant titleholder
- Title: Miss Tanzania 2005
- Years active: 2005-present
- Major competition: Miss Tanzania
- Website: nancysumari.com

Nancy Abraham Sumari is a Tanzanian author, businesswoman, social entrepreneur and beauty pageant titleholder. She is the managing director of Bongo5 Media Group (T) Ltd, the executive director of Neghesti Sumari Foundation and The Jenga Hub, as well as a published author of the children's book series, including Nyota Yako, Haki and Samia. Africa Youth Awards named her among the 100 Most Influential Young Africans.

== Early life and education ==
Sumari was born in Arusha. She had her primary and secondary education in Kenya, her undergraduate studies from the University of Dar Es Salaam, a Future Leaders of Business and Industry from Lehigh University, PA. and a master's degree from University College London.

== Miss Tanzania and Miss World 2005 ==
Nancy won the Miss Tanzania title in 2005 and later competed at Miss World 2005 where she was placed in the top 6, and won the title Continental Queen of Africa for 2005. This is the first time and highest placement for Tanzania at Miss World pageant to date.

== Career ==
Nancy is the founder and executive director of the Neghesti Sumari Foundation whose programs and initiatives leverage the use of literature, technology and agriculture to create value. She has engaged in projects of society from women empowerment to mentoring youth and championing for quality education.

Nancy is a published author of three books, including her most recent one, that is in honour of Tanzania's first Female President, Samia Suluhu. Her first publication, 'Nyota Yako' (Your Star) is a book that is set in the form of poem and sings the songs of the great women in the Tanzanian society who are successful in the roles they play. It is meant to inspire the African girl child to be in pursuit of their dreams.

Sumari's book, titled HAKI, is a book set on the backbone of the Law Of The Child Act of 2009, that encourages children to know the rights that protect them.

Her initiatives have been anchored towards, safer online spaces for children, transforming learning outcomes among youth and children through digital literacy programs and applying design thinking methodologies to create value; for which she won the 'Tigo Digital Change Maker' award for in Tanzania.

Nancy is a member of the World Economic Forum's Global Shapers Community, a Global Village Fellow, Mandela Washington Fellow 2017, an Obama Foundation Leaders Africa 2019 fellow, A World Economic forum member of the Global Future Council (2020) a Chevening Fellow, a UNICEF Tanzania Ambassador and An African Visionary Fellow (2024).

== Books ==
- Haki

== Personal life ==
She is married to Business Man and Msasani ward councilor politician Luca H. Neghesti with whom she shares a daughter, Zuri.

Awards and nominations

Year	Event	Prize	Recipient	Result
2005	Miss Tanzania	Miss Tanzania 2005	Herself	Won
2005	Miss World	Continental Queen of Africa	Herself	Won
2012	Swahili Fashion Week Awards	Female Stylish Personality	Herself	Won
2017	Tigo Tanzania Awards	Tigo Digital Change Maker	Jenga Hub	Won
2017	Africa youth Awards	The 100 Most Influential Young Africans	Herself	Won
2021	Msichana Initiative: Anti-Child Marriage Champions	Anti-Child Marriage Champion	Herself	Nominated

Awards and achievements
Preceded by (Nigeria) Anita Uwagbale	Miss World Africa; 2005	Succeeded by (Angola) Stiviandra Oliveira
