= Ndave David Njoku =

Nigerian film maker

- Born: Abraka, Delta state, Nigeria
- Citizenship: Nigerian
- Education: Delta State University
- Occupation: Film Maker
- Title: Film Producer, Director

David Njoku (born Ndave David Njoku) is a Nigerian film maker, production manager with Nollywood Industry.

== Early life ==
Ndave hails from Ukelefi in Nkanu East Local Government Area of Enugu state but was born and bred in Abraka, Delta state, Nigeria. He is the last child from a family of seven children and grew up without a father owing to his untimely demise when he was just 14 years old.

== Education ==
Ndave did both his Primary and Secondary Education in Abraka. He completed his bachelor's degree in Delta State University (DELSU).

== Personal life ==
Ndave's first audition was in 2004 under the supervision of Mr. Perfect, who cajoled him and told him he had no future in the movie scene. The next day he went back to the audition ground and took a piece out of their script. He used the script to modify a story in his head and wrote a 4-page script. He took the script to St. Paul Catholic Church, Delta State University and went for an outing with the drama team. From there people began encouraging him to venture into the movie world.
His hobbies are making researches and playing games.
Ndave's favorite directors are Mr Ifeanyi Ikenyi (Mr. Hollywood) and Mr. Chris Nkem Okafor a.k.a. ChrisNX. His best foreign filmmaker is Steven Spielberg.

He has also worked with Queen Collete Nwadike Exquisite Face of Universe.

== Career ==
His first movie was Smack Down, where he co-starred with A-list actors like Van Vicker, Chiwetalu Agu and Uche Jombo. He then produced a short film titled The War Lord and 2008, Ndave wrote, co-directed and also was a co-executive producer alongside Oshilim Gabriel and Oshilim Anthony, a movie, Wicked Conscience, starring Chiwetalu Agu, John Paul, Uche Elendu, and Emmanuel Ahummadu a.k.a. Labista. The movie had a poor turn out and he went in for a four-year break.
In 2012, Ndave started from scratch as a location manager in Awka, Anambra state. A year later he combined both location manager and the position of production manager. Then he went into Producing again and has made the following movies:

- Broken Bottle
- JohnPaul and Rebecca
- Little Calabash
- Plantain girl
- Ghetto Packaging
- Oh Blood Money
- Sorrows of Nene
- Tears of Nene

In 2015, Ndave David Njoku co-produced the first ever blockbuster cinema movie in the Eastern region, The Last Kidnap. The movie was produced by Kas-Vid International and directed by Ifeanyi Ikpeonyi a.k.a. Mr. Hollywood.
This year 2016 gave Ndave the opportunity to shoot his first short cinema film titled The Inhaler by CD Initiative Films. He also co-produced another blockbuster, Polygamous Family starring Pete Edochie, Remi Ohajianya, Imet Goodluck .a.k.a. Tallest man. The film was produced by OG Best International.
Completed a new movie starring Nkem Owoh, Tana Adelena Egbo, and others, for Amaco Investment and just concluded a movie project for Dekross Productions, he has also work with Kingsley Onyenma. He has worked with different Movies Actors, Actresses, Models and other Entertainment Industry.
