= Miss Tanzania =

Beauty pageant

Miss Tanzania beauty pageant
- Formation: 1967
- Type: Beauty pageant
- Headquarters: Dar es Salaam
- Location: Tanzania
- Members: Miss World
- Official language: English; Swahili
- Key People: The Look Company Limited
- Website: Official website

Miss Tanzania is a national Beauty pageant in Tanzania.

== History ==
Miss Tanzania started in the 1967 and the participants for the most part were from Dar es Salaam, the winners were however not sent to compete internationally. In 1968, the government banned beauty contests in the country after advice from the ruling political party's youth league citing it was not consistent with Tanzanian culture.

In 1994 when beauty contests were allowed, the country had its first Miss Tanzania who competed in the Miss World.

Tanzania ended its decade-long drought of shining in international beauty contests in Miss World 2005, when Nancy Sumari was among the top 6 finalists and also crowned Miss World Africa.

As of 2026, the rights for sending Tanzania's representatives to Miss World were bought by Mustafa Hassanali, who launched the Miss World Tanzania pageant in 2026

== Titleholders ==
- : Declared as Winner
- : Ended as runner-up or top 5/6 qualification
- : Ended as one of the finalists or semifinalists
- : Ended as special awards winner

The winner of Miss Tanzania represents her country at the Miss World. On occasion, when the winner does not qualify (due to age) a runner-up is sent.

Year	Miss Tanzania	Placement at Miss World	Special Awards
2027	TBA	TBA	TBA
2026	Latricia Ian Sawe	Top 40	
2025	Tracy Nabukeera	Did not compete	
2024	No competition held		
2023	Halima Kopwe	Top 40	
2022	Juliana Rugumisa	Did not compete	
Due to the impact of COVID-19 pandemic, no pageants in 2020 and 2021
2019	Sylvia Sebastian	Unplaced	Miss World Talent (Top 27)
2018	Queen Elizabeth Makune	Unplaced	
2017	Julitha Kabete	Unplaced	Beauty with a Purpose (Top 20)
2016	Diana Edward Lukumai	Unplaced	
2015	Lilian Kamazima	Unplaced	Beauty With a Purpose (Top 10)
2014	Happiness Watimanywa	Unplaced	The People's Choice (1st Runner-up)
2013	Brigitte Alfred Lyimo	Unplaced	Beauty with a Purpose (2nd Runner-up)
2012	Lisa Jensen	Unplaced	Multimedia Award (Top 10); Miss World Top Model (Top 56)
2011	Salha Kifai	Unplaced	Beauty With a Purpose (Top 30)
2010	Genevieve Emmanuel Mpangala	Unplaced	
2009	Miriam Gerald	Unplaced	
2008	Nasreen Karim	Unplaced	
2007	Richa Adhia	Unplaced	
2006	Wema Sepetu	Unplaced	
2005	Nancy Sumari	Top 6	Miss World Africa
2004	Faraja Kotta	Unplaced	
2003	Sylvia Bahame	Unplaced	
2002	Angela Damas	Unplaced	
2001	Happiness Magese	Unplaced	
2000	Jacqueline Ntuyabaliwe	Unplaced	
1999	Hoyce Temu	Unplaced	
1998	Basila Mwanukuzi	Unplaced	
1997	Saida Kessy	Unplaced	
1996	Shose Sinare	Unplaced	
1995	Emily Adolf	Unplaced	
1994	Aina Maeda	Unplaced	
Did not compete between 1968—1993
1967	Theresa Shayo	Unplaced	

== See also ==
- Miss Universe Tanzania
- Miss World Tanzania
- Miss Grand Tanzania
