= Joy Chinwe Eyisi =

Nigerian academic

- Born: 3 September 1969 (age 57); Anambra
- Occupations: Author, teacher, motivational speaker
- Years active: 1969–present
- Title: Adadiebube
- Board member of: National Open University of Nigeria (NOUN), Abuja
- Spouse: Chief (Sir) Ray Ifeanyichukwu Eyisi
- Awards: Best Paper Presenter Award for 2010 Conference of the International Academy of Linguistics, Behavioural and Social Sciences, Held at Hilton, New Orleans Riverside, Louisiana, United States

Academic background
- Education: University of Nigeria, Nsukka (UNN)

Academic work
- Discipline: Professor of English
- Sub-discipline: English as Second Language (ESL)
- Notable students: Collete Nwadike (2014 Miss Tourism Nigeria & 2015 Exquisite Face of the Universe)
- Main interests: Teaching English as Second Language (TESL)
- Notable works: Common Errors in the Use of English; Phonetics of English: A Hands-on Guide to Correct Pronunciation; A Grammar of English: The Student’s Companion

Joy Chinwe Eyisi // (born 3 September 1969) is a Nigerian professor, author, scholar, educationalist, and philanthropist of Igbo descent. Between 2006 and 2011, she was head of department, English Language and Literature, Faculty of Arts, Nnamdi Azikiwe University, (NAU), Awka, Anambra State. She is now deputy vice-chancellor (academic) of National Open University of Nigeria (NOUN), a position she assumed on 26 October 2017. Eyisi, who was hitherto the centre director of NOUN's Study Centre in the National Assembly in Abuja, emerged winner of the election held by the University Senate on 25 October 2017. She succeeds Professor Patrick Eya as the university's first female deputy vice-chancellor (academic).

== Early years and marriage ==
Eyisi is a native of Eziora Village of Adazi-Ani in Anaocha Local Government Area of Anambra State, located in the southeastern region of Nigeria. After her NCE programme, she married Chief Ray Ifeanyichukwu Eyisi, an Anglican Communion of Nigeria knight and businessman from the same village, whom she first met in her village. Her second son Noble Eyisi was once President of the Student Union Government (SUG), Nnamdi Azikiwe University. Her only daughter (Joy Eyisi, Jnr, the author of Willy-Nilly, a novel that is classified as Nigerian children's literature of the 21st century) is a first-class degree graduate in English from Covenant University, Ota, Ogun State, Nigeria.

== Education and career ==
Eyisi said she was one of the weakest pupils in the class, with poor results in her early formal education. In other words, for her primary school education, she was enrolled at Central School, Nnewi, but completed her First School Leaving Certificate at St Jude's Central School, Adazi-Ani, in 1981. In the same year, with a better Common Entrance Examination result, she was admitted to Girls’ High School, Agulu, which was then under the leadership of Rev (Sr) Miriam Theresa Ozomma. She finished in 1986. Eyisi, as she is best cited in academia, bagged her National Certificate in Education (NCE) from Anambra State College of Education, Awka (1986–1989). She went for further studies at the University of Nigeria, (UNN), Nsukka, Enugu, graduating with a bachelor's degree (Second-Class Upper Division) in Education and English. After her national service in 1994, she was admitted for a master's degree programme in Education Administration and School Supervision, Nnamdi Azikiwe University, from where she graduated as the overall best student amidst a nation-wide ASUU strike of 1995. Between 1997 and 2000, she went for MA/PhD at her Alma mater, UNN.

Eyisi started her professional career as a part-time lecturer at Nwafor Orizuo College of Education, Nsugbe, though she had been a part-time lecturer at Nnamdi Azikiwe University early in 1996. In 2000, the latter granted her appointment as a full-time lecturer. Her progress from Lecturer I to professorial rank on 1 October 2007 roughly took seven years to accomplish; hence she was adjudged the youngest professor in the university at that time. Eyisi's influence brought about the construction of the Department of English Language and Literature (situated close to Nnamdi Azikiwe University's Faculty of Law) by a Nigerian transporter, Chief Godwin Ubaka Okeke (MON). She has been a Visiting/Adjust Professor in various tertiary institutions of learning, some of which are St Paul University, Awka, (2002–2005), and Ebonyi State University, Abakaliki the capital city of Ebonyi State, southeastern Nigeria (2001–2005).

== Notable publications ==
As a scholar, Eyisi is known to have authored, co-authored, and edited several academic articles, journals, textbooks, motivational booklets, and conference presentations that are widely cited. Her Oral English for Successful Performance and Phonetics of English: A Hands-on Guide to Correct Pronunciation focus on how to acquire and master phonetic and phonological competence in English. Her best known work, Common Errors in the Use of English, identifies and corrects some notable errors many speakers commit while using the English language. A Grammar of English: The Student’s Companion, another of her work, takes learners into the rudiments of English as a second language, while The Mechanics of Reading Comprehension and Summary Writing identifies ways readers can understand and interpret printed words. With The Secret of Academic Success, which she claimed to be her best work, Joy Eyisi encourages students to aspire for academic excellence. English for All Purposes: Hands-on Guide for Excellence in the Use of English, co-authored with Chinonso Okolo and Joseph Onwe, as a reviewer noted, has the tendency to “provide a quick reference material…a refreshing tool to jog the memory about some intricate Quirk and Greenbaum university English and other text.

== Advocacy and use of English ==
Her favorite quotes "Aspire to the zenith. Never look for Very Good where Excellent is possible" and "The noblest search is the search for excellence" are inspirations for her academic achievements and leadership style. Eyisi, collaborating with other five authors, proposes a shift towards the prescription and description of a mutually intelligible variety of the English language to be used only in Global Education. As a scholar who has received a number of local and international awards for her contributions in education, she often advocates the correct use and teaching of English in the second language situation.

Schools must also be provided with language laboratory, standard library, among others to bring out the best among the pupils and teachers too. The current situation is deplorable. I even promised to present gift (sic) to teachers who could spell 50 words correctly at different seminars where I served as a facilitator across the country, and I can tell you that hardly could we get 10 correct answers.

The statement above captures her reservations about the poor use of English in Nigeria and Africa. It is noted that Eyisi has a strong influence on her audience in any workshop she participates in as a facilitator. In ‘’The Role of Women in Empowering Change’’, which she delivered in a workshop, Eyisi avers that childbearing should not be an excuse for furthering education, advocating that: “A girl child should be given the opportunity to be educated, she should go to school, she should acquire education.”

== Awards and membership of professional bodies ==
As part of her contributions to education and the society generally, Eyisi, in 2004, received Silver Jubilee Merit Award from Bishop Crowther Seminary, Awka; 2005 Adadiebube: Recognition and Merit Award from St. Jude’s Anglican Church Adazi-ani Women's General Meeting (Home and Abroad); Great Woman of Honour Recognition and Merit Award from BBC Club, UNIZIK, Awka (2005); a Menu of Integrity, Merit and Certificate from Rotary International, Rotary Club of Awka, District 9140 (2006); Doyenne of Excellence, Distinguished Scholarship Award, from English Language Teachers Association of Nigeria (2007). She also bagged Educational Leadership Award from the Institute of Industrial Administration (2007); Leadership Merit Award from First Bank of Nigeria Plc (2008); Award of Excellence: An Appreciation of Wonderful Contributions to Academic Excellence in NAU, Hostel Union Government, Awka (2009); Merit Award in Recognition of her Contributions to the Growth of Engineering Profession and Youth Empowerment by the Nigerian Universities Engineering Student’ Association NAU Branch (2010); the Most Prestigious Academic Excellence Award in Recognition of her Contributions to the Growth of Education in Nigeria, Presented by the University of Nigeria Alumni Association, Awka (2010).

In addition to these awards and honours with several others, Eyisi is a member of several professional organisations such as the National Association of Teachers of English, National Association for the Advancement of Knowledge, Modern Languages’ Association of Nigeria, International Reading Association, Association of Nigerian Authors (ANA), and English Language Teacher's Association of Nigeria, etc.
