= Yetunde Barnabas =

Nigerian model & actress (born 1990)

- Born: August 30, 1990 (age 36); Kogi, Nigeria
- Occupations: Actress; model; producer
- Beauty pageant titleholder
- Years active: 2012–present
- Major competitions: Miss Olokun (2013); Most Beautiful Girl in Abuja (2017) (winner); Miss Tourism Nigeria(2019)

Yetunde Barnabas is a Nigerian model, beauty queen, actress and film producer. She initially gained recognition as the winner of The Most Beautiful Girl in Abuja pageant in 2017 and was crowned Miss Tourism Nigeria in 2019. She is best known for her role as Miss Pepeiye on Nigeria's long-running sitcom, Papa Ajasco and Company, as well as several leading roles in the Yoruba movie industry.

She is married to Nigerian footballer Peter Olayinka.

== Early life ==
Yetunde Barnabas was born on August 30, 1990, in Ilorin, Kwara state, though her family is originally from Ejuku, Yagba east Kogi State. Barnabas grew up in Abuja, and after her secondary school education at the Kings of Kings Secondary School, she attended Seriki Olopolo Production and Royal Arts Academy where she honed her acting skills.

== Career ==
Yetunde Barnabas began her modeling career when she registered for the Miss Olokun beauty pageant in 2013, a competition, which she went on to win. She also competed in other smaller pageants, including the Miss Live Your Dream in 2014, but it was her participation in the Most Beautiful Girl in Abuja pageant that gained her notoriety. In 2016, Barnabas registered for the 2017 Most Beautiful Girl in Abuja competition, which she won and as a result, she a national endorsement deal with Multichoice/DSTV. She was also made a brand ambassador for an Abuja-based estate management firm.

Barnabas leveraged on her newfound fame and auditioned for and was chosen for the role of Ms Pepeiye, an iconic character on one of Nigeria's longest-running television sitcoms, Papa Ajasco & Company. Since then she has featured in leading roles in several Nollywood film productions, including Erin Folami, Dagogo, Omo Iya Osun and Elegbenla, a film she featured alongside Niyi Johnson and Akin Olaiya.

Barnabas has also produced a few movie productions to her credit including the 2018 film, Omo Iya Osun, which had positive reviews.

== Awards and recognition ==
In 2019, Yetunde Barnabas was nominated for the Most Promising Actress of the Year at the Nigerian Achiever's Awards in recognition of her various television and film roles within the year in review. Barnabas was also nominated for Model of the Year at the Scream Awards 2019 as well as Beauty Queen of the Year at the Africa Choice Awards.

In August 2019, Barnabas was selected, alongside other African models by the British Broadcasting Corporation (BBC), as part of a new beauty campaign tagged Ewatomi.

== Personal life ==
In March 2021 she married Nigerian football player Peter Olayinka.

== Filmography ==
=== Selected filmography ===
- 2025 - Koleoso
- 2016 - Papa Ajasco & Company
- 2017 - Alaya Imarun
- 2017 - Ede Meji
- 2018 - Lisa
- 2018 - Queen Mi
- 2018 - Omo Iya Osun
- 2019 - Oka ori ebe
- 2019 - Imule Aje
- 2019 - Lori Titi
- 2019 - Olode
- 2019 - Omije Afoju
- 2019 - Knockout
- 2019 - Dagogo
- 2019 - Aiye
- 2019 - Elegbenla
- 2019 - Bayonle
- 2019 - Erin Folami
