= Jacqueline Mengi =

Tanzanian furniture designer

- Born: Jacqueline Ntyubaliwe; Tanzania
- Other name: Klynn
- Education: Rhodec International (D.I.D)
- Occupations: Singer; Entrepreneur
- Spouse: Reginald Mengi (m. 2016; died 2019)
- Beauty pageant titleholder
- Title: Miss Tanzania 2000
- Years active: 2000–present
- Major competition: Miss Tanzania

Jacqueline Ntuyabaliwe Mengi is a Tanzanian musician, businesswoman and beauty pageant titleholder who won Miss Tanzania 2000.

She is also a furniture designer and chairman of Amorette Ltd a furniture design and manufacturing company. Jacqueline is also the founder and chairman of Dr Ntuyabaliwe Foundation a charity organization which provides libraries and books to local primary schools.

== Career ==
=== Music career ===
She began her career as a musician in 1997 with a Tanzanian band the Tanzanites. She performed as one of the lead vocalists for three years. In 2004 she released her first solo album with a hit single Nalia kwa Furaha. Three years later she released another album called Crazy over You which was also the name of the first hit single for that album.

=== Miss Tanzania 2000 ===
In 2000, she won the Miss Tanzania and represented the country in Miss World.

== Personal life ==
Jacqueline was married to Reginald Mengi, a business man and media tycoon.

== Awards and nominations ==
Year	Event	Prize	Recipient	Result
2007	Tanzania Music Awards	Best Female Artist & Best Collaboration	(Crazy Over You, with Squeezer)	Nominated
2007	Pearl of Africa Music Awards	Best Tanzanian Female Artist	Herself	Nominated
2008	Tanzania Music Awards	Best Female Artist	Herself	Nominated
2008	Pearl of Africa Music Awards	Best Tanzanian Female Artist	Herself	Nominated
2013	Swahili Fashion Week Awards	Stylish Female Personality	Herself	Won
2016	Swahili Fashion Week Awards	Style Icon of the Year	Herself	Nominated
2017	A Design International Awards (Roma)	Bronze Award For Furniture Category	Ngorongoro settee	Won
2017	A Design International Awards (Roma)	Bronze Award For Light Category	Sayari Lamp	Won

2018

Stevie International Awards-Entrepreneur of the Year- Manufacturing
