= Rems Umeasiegbu =

- Born: Rems Nnanyelugo Umeasiegbu; 1 October 1943 (age 83); Aba, Abia State
- Occupations: Author, Poet, Folklorist
- Writing career
- Period: 1943–present
- Genres: Novel, Poetry, Folklore
- Subject: Oral Literature

Rems Nnanyelugo Umeasiegbu Ig (born 1 October 1943), is a Nigerian professor, scholar, novelist, poet and folklorist from south-eastern Nigeria. He was also a Principal Lecturer at the Institute of Management Technology, Enugu (1978-1982), and Head of Department, Mass Communications, IMT, Nigeria (1982-1986) and professor of oral literature at Nnamdi Azikiwe University, Awka as well as a consultant to Koruna Books Publications.

== Early life and marriage ==
Umeasiegbu was born in Aba, though a native of Amesi in Aguata Local Government of Anambra State. One Ugandan reviewer has this to say about Rems' background:

His father, G. U. Umeasiegbu a.k.a Gerald Umeasiegbu was born in 1900 and died in 1978. He is a leading elder in the county of Aba, and he customarily entertained such dignitaries as the councillors of the Aba Urban Council. One day when the councillors gathered in his homestead, he asked his son, Rems Nna Umeasiegbu, to bring in palmwine for the guests, The son served the palmwine without taking a sip first, a violation of Ibo custom. The father threatened to remove him from school, which, the father felt, was corrupting his knowledge of the Ibo traditions. The serious sermon following the reprimand left such an imprint on Umeasiegbu's mind that he later decided to reconstruct the Ibo customs as he recollected them while studying at Oxfordshire in Britain. Thus his only informant in retrospect was his father, and his only methodology, corruption of his father's sermons and tale-telling sessions.

In 1976, at the request of the Nigerian government, Rems returned to Nigeria. He married a school teacher Virginia Okediogwu Anakwenze on 16 October 1976 and they have four children. Back in Nigeria, he worked at the Federal Ministry of Information, Lagos as an information officer with responsibilities for organising the festival of black arts and culture, FESTAC '77.

== Education ==
Professor Rems attended CKS, Aba, before studying at College of Immaculate Conception, Enugu. In 1966, he proceeded to England for further studies. He later studied in Oxfordshire, England. After spending a year in England, he got a scholarship to study for his Master of Arts at the University of Sedmnact, Listopadu, Prague, Czech Republic in 1971 and another MA at the University of Pennsylvania in 1972. He then later bagged a doctorate degree in Oral Literature from the University of Pennsylvania, the US, in 1975. He moved to the Grambling State University, Louisiana, where he was an assistant professor.

== Notable publications ==
While in Prague, he wrote his first major work The Way We lived (1969) at the age of 26. The seminal work is a chronicle of folk tales from pre-colonial Nigeria. At Louisiana he wrote the work of fiction Mazi Amesi, a fictional account of an African slave. Throughout his teaching career, Umeasiegbu remained an avid writer, publishing over 35 books in a course of his career which include The Inevitable Aftermath, End of the Road(1985), Anukili Na Ugama: An Igbo Epic, Ask the Storyteller: Tales from Northern Nigeria, Words Are Sweet (1982), The Study of Igbo Culture (1986) and so on . For his artistic output, he was honoured with Distinguished Writers' Award in 1987. The richness of Rems' Ghost Stories in oral literature fascinated a scholar to affirm that: "Umeasiegbu has therefore championed a new literary subgenre in Nigerian literature which is not strictly confined to folktale narrative techniques, but is purely categorized as ghost lore."

== Career ==
Rems left Lagos for a teaching appointment at the University of Nigeria, Nsukka, where he was a colleague of the renowned writer the late Professor Chinua Achebe. He left the University of Nigeria in 1978, for the Institute of Management Technology, Enugu, where he rose to be the deputy head of the institution. Upon the creation of Anambra State, Umeasiegbu joined the newly formed Nnamdi Azikiwe University, Awka, as one of the pioneer staff of the Department of English Language and Literature. He was made a professor of oral literature in 2001. He retired in 2008. He has served as a visiting professor at the Department of English Language and Literature, Ebonyi State University, Abakaliki, since 2014.
