= Mustafa Hassanali =

Tanzanian fashion designer

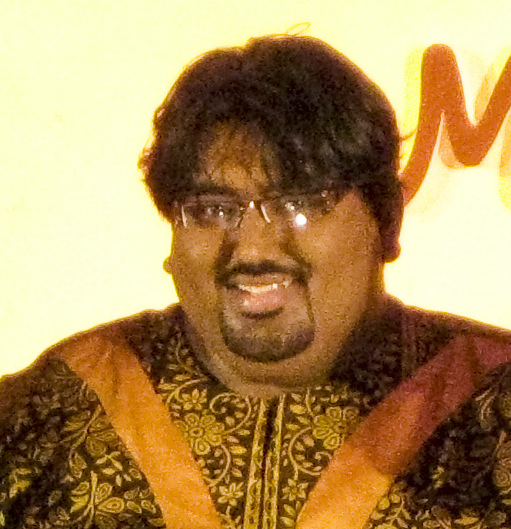
- Born: 9 June 1980 (age 45)
- Occupation: Fashion designer
- Website: www.mustafahassanali.net

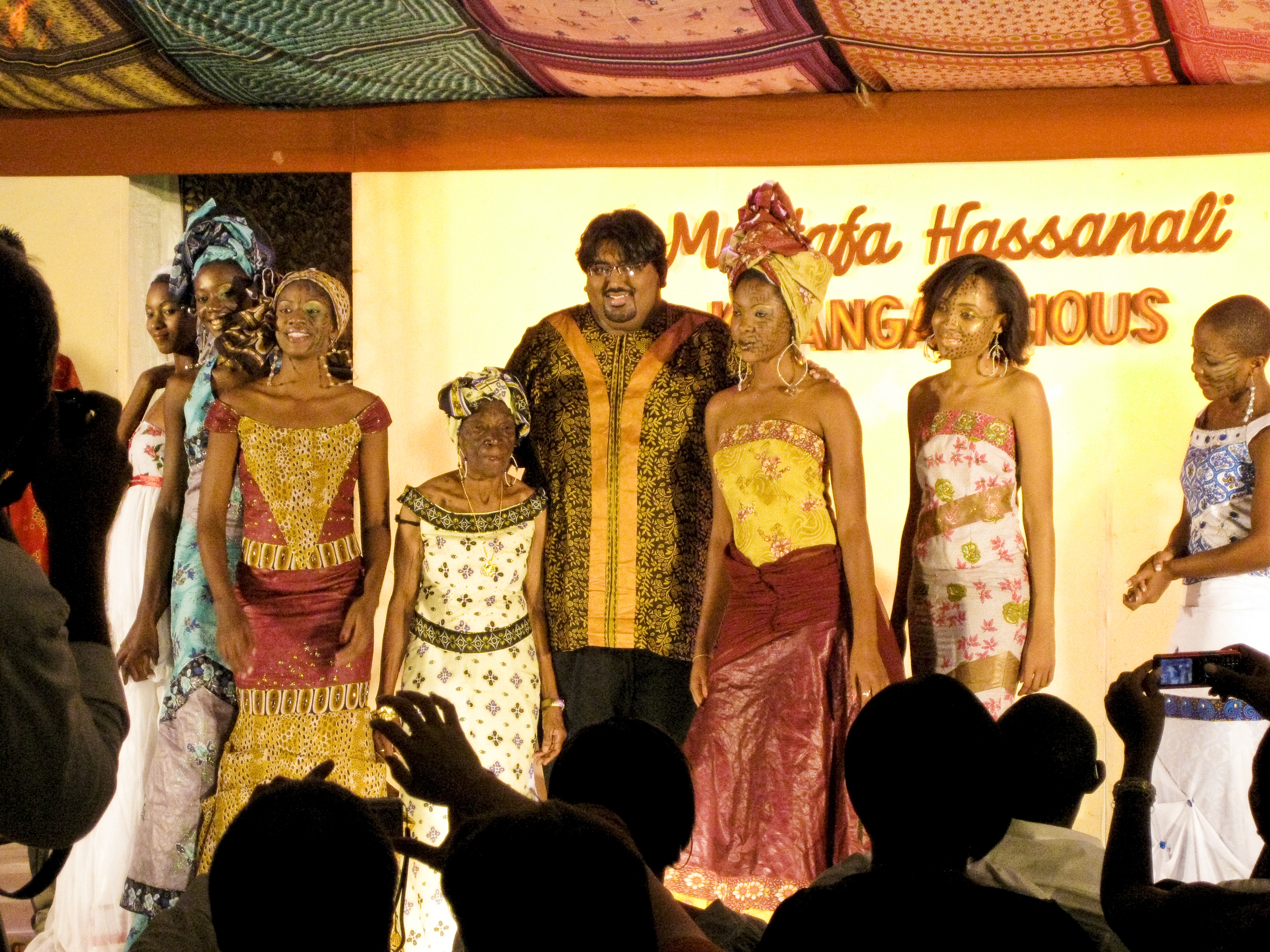
Hassanali at the Khangalicious Fashion Show

Mustafa Hassanali (born June 9, 1980) is a Tanzanian fashion designer. Hassanali is also the founder of Swahili Fashion Week.
