= Miss World Tanzania =

Beauty pageant

Miss World Tanzania beauty pageant
- Formation: 2026
- Type: Beauty pageant
- Headquarters: Dar es Salaam
- Location: Tanzania
- Members: Miss World
- Official language: English; Swahili
- Key People: Mustafa Hassanali

Miss World Tanzania is a national Beauty pageant in Tanzania.

== History ==
Miss World Tanzania pageant started in the year 2026 after the Tanzanian designer, Mustafa Hassanali bought the rights to send Tanzania's representatives to the Miss World competition.

The very first edition was held at Super Dome, Masaki, in Dar-es-Salaam on 19 April 2026. The reigning Miss World from Thailand Suchata Chuangsri crowned the first winner of the competition Latricia Ian from Dar-es-Salaam.

== Titleholders ==
Year	Miss Tanzania	Placement at Miss World	Special Awards
2026	Latricia Ian	Top 40	
2027	TBA	TBA	TBA
