= Miss Tourism Africa =

- Type: Beauty Pageant
- Parent organization: Qhue Concepts
- Headquarters: Lagos, Nigeria
- First edition: 2022; 4 years ago
- Most recent edition: 2024
- Current titleholder: Ndinelago Emosho, Namibia
- Chief Executive Officer: Seth Santiago Roberts
- Language: English
- Website: Official Website

Miss Tourism Africa established in 2015 is an annual international beauty pageant open to African women and from other African communities around the world, including France, Spain, Japan, China, Germany, the United Kingdom, Canada, USA. It is Organized by Qhue Concepts and endorsed by the Lagos State Government.

Miss Tourism Africa currently has licensees in 21 countries; producing national winners/representatives from their respective countries for the annual international finals.

The current titleholder is Ndinelago Kalikoka Emosho, who represented Namibia in the competition.

== Competition ==
Misd Tourism Afica is a yearly pageant. Contestants are sought across the world, they specifically look for women from Afri communities with unique beauty, personality and intelligence. Finalists from around the world compete at the grand final.

To be eligible to participate in Miss Tourism Africa, a local company or person purchases licensing rights for the local country. Licensing rights includes the rights of image, brand and everything related to the pageant. The number of participants fluctuates annually because of the franchising of the pageant paired with conflicting schedules to the regular calendar.

== History ==
Miss Tourism Africa was founded by Seth Santiago Roberts, the pageant was first registered in 2015 but formally launched its debut edition in 2022. The debut edition held in October 2022 in Lagos, Nigeria with seven participating countries, Noni Kariuki representing Kenya emerged winner of the maiden edition. The grand finale is usually held on either the 1st or 2nd of October each year.

== Titleholders ==
List of winners of Miss Tourism Africa from its inception
Year	Titleholder	Country	Ref(s)
2022	Noni Kariuki	Kenya	
2023	Sphilangomusa Msweli	South Africa	
2024	Ndinelago Emosho	Namibia	

== 2025 edition ==
The city of Jos in Plateau state has been named host city for Miss Tourism Africa 2025 edition where 30 beauty queens from 30 different countries will be competing. The competition has been endorsed by the Governor of Plateau State, Caleb Mutfwang.
