= Sotheary By =

Cambodian beauty pageant winner

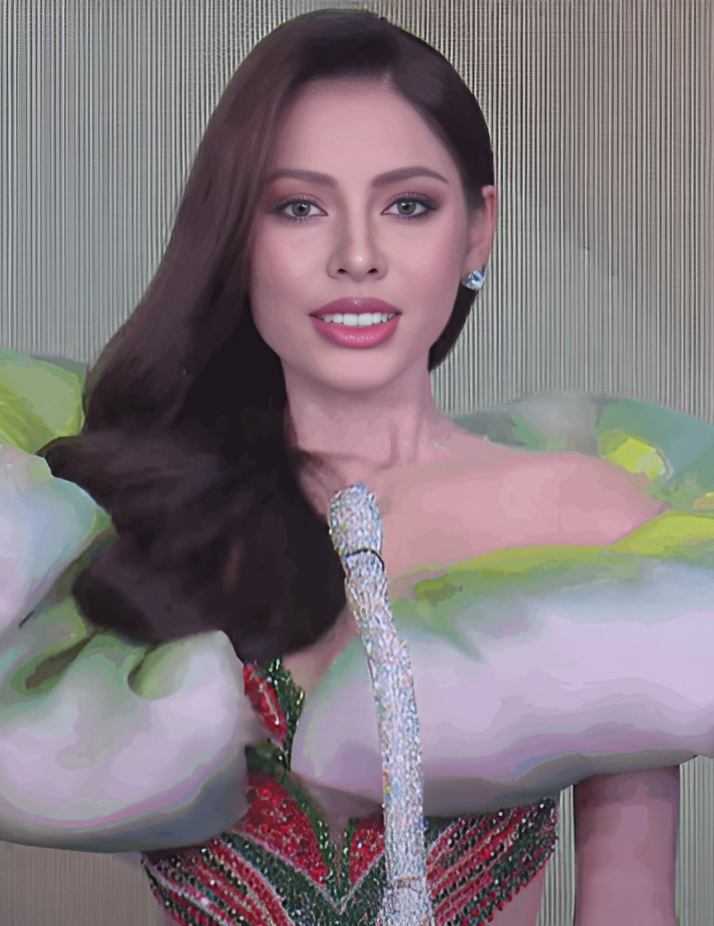
- Sotheary By in 2024
- Born: Sotheary By
- Occupation: Model
- Beauty pageant titleholder
- Title: Miss Cambodia 2016; Miss Universe Cambodia 2017; Miss Charm Cambodia 2023; Miss Grand Kampong Chhnang 2024; Miss Grand Cambodia 2024; Miss Cosmo Cambodia 2026
- Major competitions: Miss Cambodia 2016; (Winner); Miss Universe 2017; (Unplaced); Miss Charm 2023; (Unplaced); (Best National Costume); Miss Grand Kampong Chhnang 2024; (Winner); Miss Grand Cambodia 2024; (Winner); Miss Grand International 2024; (Withdrew); Miss Cosmo Cambodia 2025; (Runner-Up); Miss Cosmo Cambodia 2026; (Winner); Miss Cosmo 2026; (TBD)

Sotheary By (Khmer: ប៊ី សុធារី) is a Cambodian model and beauty pageant titleholder who won the title of Miss Cambodia 2016. She represented Cambodia at Miss Universe 2017 and Miss Charm 2023. In 2024, she was crowned Miss Grand Cambodia 2024 and was originally set to represent Cambodia at Miss Grand International 2024, but later withdrew. She was later crowned Miss Cosmo Cambodia 2026 and is set to represent Cambodia at Miss Cosmo 2026.

== Pageantry ==
=== Miss Southeast Asia 2014 ===
Sotheary By began her pageantry career by competing in Miss Southeast Asia 2014. During the competition, she received the Miss Elegance and Best Evening Gown special awards.

=== Super Model International 2015 ===
She later competed in Super Model International 2015, where she finished as the second runner-up.

=== Miss Cambodia 2016 ===
In 2016, Sotheary By competed in Miss Cambodia 2016 and won the competition.

=== Miss Universe 2017 ===
Following her victory, she represented Cambodia at Miss Universe 2017, becoming the first Cambodian representative to compete in the Miss Universe pageant. She did not advance to the Top 16.

=== Miss Charm 2023 ===
She was later selected to represent Cambodia at Miss Charm 2023, which was held in Ho Chi Minh City, Vietnam. Although she did not advance to the top 20, she received a special award for best national costume.

=== Miss Grand Cambodia 2024 and Miss Grand International 2024 ===
In 2024, Sotheary By competed as the representative of Kampong Chhnang at Miss Grand Cambodia 2024. She won the national title and was crowned Miss Grand Cambodia 2024.

At Miss Grand International, she initially represented Cambodia as Miss Grand Cambodia 2024. She participated in the initial activities of the competition but later withdrew following a dispute between the Miss Grand Cambodia organizers and the Miss Grand International organization.

=== Miss Cosmo Cambodia 2025 ===
In 2025, she competed in Miss Cosmo Cambodia 2025, where she finished as the runner-up. Sreypii Phorn was crowned the winner and became Cambodia's representative at Miss Cosmo 2025.

=== Miss Cosmo Cambodia 2026 and Miss Cosmo 2026 ===
The following year, Sotheary By returned to compete in Miss Cosmo Cambodia 2026. She was crowned Miss Cosmo Cambodia 2026, succeeding Sreypii Phorn, and was selected to represent Cambodia at Miss Cosmo 2026.

Awards and achievements
| Preceded by First titleholder | Miss Universe Cambodia; 2017 | Succeeded by Rern Nat |
| Preceded by First titleholder | Miss Charm Cambodia; 2023 | Succeeded by Sreyneat Det |
| Preceded by Sreyno Phoem | Miss Grand Cambodia; 2024 | Succeeded by Incumbent |
| Preceded by Sreypii Phorn | Miss Cosmo Cambodia; 2026 | Succeeded by Incumbent |
