= Gabriela Borges =

Brazilian beauty pageant titleholder

Ana Gabriela Borges
- Born: Paraná, Brazil
- Beauty pageant titleholder
- Title: Miss Brazil All Nations 2019; Miss Grand Paraná 2021; Miss Cosmo Brazil 2025
- Major competitions: Miss Brazil All Nations 2019 (Winner); Miss Earth São Paulo 2021 (Top 5); Miss Grand Paraná 2021 (Winner); Miss Grand Brazil 2022 (1st Runner-up); Miss Cosmo 2025; (Top 5)

Ana Gabriela Borges is a Brazilian beauty pageant titleholder who won Miss Brazil All Nations 2019. She represented Brazil at Miss Cosmo 2025 in Vietnam, where she reached the top five.

== Pageantry ==
=== Miss Brazil All Nations 2019 ===
Borges won her first pageant, Miss Brazil All Nations 2019.

=== Miss Grand Paraná 2021 ===
In 2021, Borges won Miss Grand Paraná 2021.

=== Miss Grand Brazil 2022 ===
Borges represented Paraná at Miss Grand Brazil 2022 and was first runner-up.

=== Miss Cosmo 2025 ===
Borges who was appointed Miss Cosmo Brazil 2025, represented Brazil at Miss Cosmo 2025 on December 20, 2025, in Vietnam. At the conclusion of the event, she placed in the Top 5 and won the Best in Swimsuit award, as well as the Global Beauties Experts’ Award.

Awards and achievements
Preceded by Romina Lozano; Samantha Elliott; Bùi Thị Xuân Hạnh	Miss Cosmo (Top 5); 2025	Incumbent
Preceded by Cristielli Monize Camargo	Miss Cosmo Brazil; 2025	Incumbent
Preceded by Mylena Duarte	1st Runner-up Miss Grand Brazil; 2022	Succeeded by Cinthya Moura
Preceded by Clarissa Thomsen	Miss Grand Paraná; 2021	Succeeded by Ana Finkler
