= Ioanna Sarantopoulou =

Greek beauty pageant titleholder

- Born: Athens, Greece
- Education: King's College London; National University of Singapore
- Beauty pageant titleholder
- Title: Miss Cosmo Greece 2025
- Major competitions: Miss Cosmo Greece 2025 (Winner); Miss Cosmo 2025; (Top 21)

Ioanna Sarantopoulou (Greek: Ιωάννα Σαραντοπούλου) is a Greek beauty pageant titleholder, who won Miss Cosmo Greece 2025. She represented Greece at Miss Cosmo 2025 in Vietnam, where she reached the top 21.

== Education ==
Ioanna Sarantopoulou was born in Athens, Greece. She holds a Bachelor's degree in English Law (Bachelor of Laws - LL.B.) from King's College London. She graduated with First Class Honours. At the age of 20 she obtained a Master's degree (Master of Laws – LL.M.) from the National University of Singapore with a specialisation in International Arbitration & Dispute Resolution.

Sarantopoulou is a certified Social & Business Etiquette consultant, having received training from the British School of Excellence and the Swiss finishing school Institut Villa Pierrefeu.

Sarantopoulou speaks fluently five languages (English, Greek, Bulgarian, Spanish, French) and has intermediate knowledge of another two (Arabic and Italian).

She is also a classical pianist and a ballet dancer, since her early childhood. In her spare time, she is an artist.

== Pageantry ==
Sarantopoulou participated in the national beauty pageant Star Hellas in December 2024, where she won the title of Miss Cosmo Greece 2025. She was crowned by Miss Cosmo Greece 2024 Konstantina Sotiriou and Miss Cosmo International 2024 Ketut Permata Juliastrid. She represented Greece and reached the top 21 at Miss Cosmo 2025 held in Ho Chi Minh City, Vietnam, on December 20, 2025. She also won the Women Leadership Award.

Awards and achievements
Preceded by Blessing Temilade Alimi	Cosmo's Women Leadership Award; 2025	Succeeded by Incumbent
Preceded by Konstantina Sotiriou	Miss Cosmo Greece; 2025	Succeeded by Ziwei Dimitra Varaki
