= Italy Mora =

Panamanian beauty pageant titleholder

- Beauty pageant titleholder
- Title: Miss Panamá Centro 2023; Miss Riviera del Canal 2024; Señorita Panamá 2024; (removed): Miss Cosmo Panamá 2025
- Major competitions: Miss Panamá 2023; (Top 7); Miss Universe Panamá 2024; (Winner; removed); Miss Cosmo Panamá (Appointed); Miss Cosmo 2025; (Top 5)

Italy Mora is a Panamanian model and beauty pageant of titleholder who won Señorita Panamá 2024. She represented Panama at Miss Cosmo 2025 in Vietnam, and reached the top five.

== Personal life ==
Mora is from Panama City. She is a professional model.

== Pageantry ==
=== Miss Panamá 2023 ===
On September 13, 2023, Mora represented the state of Panamá Centro at Miss Panamá 2023, and reached the top seven. She also won the Photogenic and Best Projection awards.

=== Señorita Panamá 2024 ===
On August 3, 2024, Mora represented The Riviera del Canal and won Señorita Panamá 2024, competing against 24 candidates at the Figali Convention Center, in Panama City, Panama.

=== Miss Universe 2024 ===
At Miss Universe 2024 in Mexico, Mora was disqualified for leaving the hotel without permission from the Miss Universe Organization. She later stated that she had been informed the "measure was taken due to non-compliance with leaving the room, which I admit occurred to put on makeup and collect personal items." She said that the measure was a severe one and the matter could have been "resolved with a dialogue or a warning." After her disqualification, she was removed by the Señorita Panama Organisation as Miss Universe Panama 2024.

=== Miss Cosmo 2025 ===
Mora was appointed as Miss Cosmo Panama 2025, on July 27, 2025. She was the first representative of Panama at an international pageant. Mora competed and reached the top five at Miss Cosmo 2025, held on December 20, 2025, in Vietnam. During the competition, she won the Cosmo Beauty Icon Award.

Awards and achievements
Preceded by Natasha Vargas	Miss Panamá; 2024	Succeeded by Mirna Caballini
Preceded by Alina López	Miss Panamá Centro; 2023	Succeeded by Liliam Ashby
Preceded by None	Miss Riviera del Canal; 2024	Succeeded by incumbent
Preceded by Inaugural	Miss Cosmo Panama; 2025	Succeeded by Incumbent
Preceded by Ketut Permata Juliastrid	Cosmo Beauty Icon Award; 2025	Succeeded by Incumbent
Preceded by Romina Lozano (United States) Samantha Elliott (Vietnam) Bùi Thị Xuân Hạnh	Miss Cosmo (Top 5); 2025	Incumbent
