= Juliana Franco =

Colombian beauty pageant titleholder

- Beauty pageant titleholder
- Title: Miss Earth Colombia 2017
- Major competitions: Miss Earth 2017; (Miss Earth - Water); Miss Universe Colombia 2020; (Top 16)

Juliana Franco is a Colombian beauty pageant titleholder. She represented her country at the Miss Earth 2017 pageant.

== Pageantry ==
=== Miss Earth 2017 ===
Franco represented Colombia at Miss Earth 2017 in Pasay, Philippines. She won the elemental title Miss Earth - Water 2017 during the pageant final.

=== Miss Universe Colombia 2020 ===
Following the announcement of a change in ownership of the Miss Universe Colombia franchise, Franco decided to register as a contestant representing Meta Department in the inaugural Miss Universe Colombia competition. Having successfully advanced through all rounds, she was selected to represent her province. The final night took place on November 16, 2020, where she secured a spot among the 16 finalists.

=== Miss Cosmo 2026 ===
She has been appointed Miss Cosmo Colombia 2026 and will represent Colombia at Miss Cosmo 2026, to be held in Vietnam in early 2027.

Awards and achievements
Preceded by Stephanie de Zorzi (Venezuela)	Miss Earth - Water; 2017	Succeeded by Valeria Ayos (Colombia)
Preceded by Michelle Gómez	Miss Earth Colombia; 2017	Succeeded by Valeria Ayos
Preceded by Dayana Cardenas (Amazonas Department)	Miss Cosmo Colombia; 2026	Incumbent
