= Samantha Jo Elliott =

American beauty pageant titleholder (born 2001)

- Born: Samantha Jo Elliott; April 18, 2001 (age 25); Freeport, Illinois, U.S.
- Education: University of Kansas; University of Alabama
- Beauty pageant titleholder
- Title: Miss Illinois USA 2023; Miss Cosmo USA 2024
- Major competitions: Miss Illinois USA 2023; (Winner); Miss USA 2023; (Top 20); Miss Cosmo 2024; (Top 5)

Samantha Jo Elliott (born April 18, 2001) is an American beauty pageant titleholder who won Miss Illinois USA 2023. She represented the United States at Miss Cosmo 2024 held in Vietnam and reached the top five. She previously represented Illinois and reached the top 20 of Miss USA 2023.

== Pageantry ==
=== Miss USA 2023 ===
She represented Illinois at Miss USA 2023 and made it to the Top 20 finalists.

=== Miss Cosmo 2024 ===
She is the first representative of Miss Cosmo USA to attend Miss Cosmo 2024, and reached the top five.

== Film ==
Elliott played the Darker Rider in the movie American Fable.

Awards and achievements
Preceded by First	Miss Cosmo USA; 2024	Succeeded by Yolina Lindquist (Illinois)
Preceded by Angeliz Reyes	Miss Illinois USA; 2023	Succeeded by Grace Rodi
Preceded by None	Miss Cosmo (Top 5); 2024	Succeeded by (Brazil) Gabriela Borges (Myanmar) Myint Myat Moe (Panama) Italy Mora
