= Miss Grand Thailand 2022 =

9th Miss Grand Thailand pageant

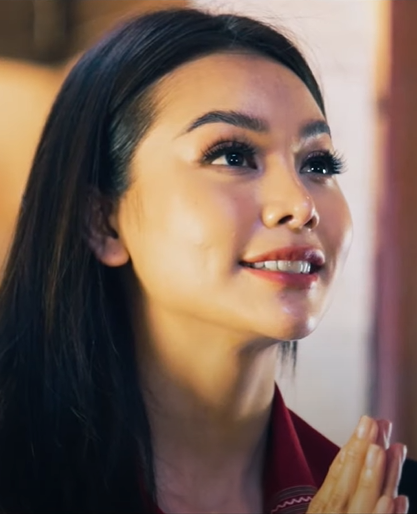
- Engfa Waraha, Miss Grand Thailand 2022
- Date: 30 April 2022
- Presenters: Matthew Deane
- Venue: Show DC Hall, Bangkok, Thailand
- Broadcaster: YouTube, Facebook Live
- Entrants: 77
- Placements: 20
- Winner: Engfa Waraha (Bangkok)
- Best National Costume: Ratchaya Mingboon (Chachoengsao); Niratcha Namwatcharasopit (Lopburi); Suthida Ninpai (Phetchabun); Chayanapas Chompoorat (Rayong); Pa-ornrat Pinmueang (Surin)
- Photogenic: Engfa Waraha (Bangkok)
- Best in Swimsuit: Athita Payak (Chiang Mai)
- Best in Evening Gown: Aizryh Phipat (Nakhon Sawan)

Miss Grand Thailand 2022 (Thai: มิสแกรนด์ไทยแลนด์ 2022) is the ninth edition of the Miss Grand Thailand beauty contest, held on 30 April 2022 at Show DC Hall in Bangkok, Thailand. The coronation was initially scheduled in August 2021, however, due to the COVID-19 pandemic, the event was rescheduled twice, first in late-2021, and later to 2022. At the end of the event, the appointed Miss Grand Thailand 2021, Indy Johnson of Pathum Thani, crowned her successor, Engfa Waraha of Bangkok, a former contestant on the 2018/2019 The Voice Thailand, making her the first representative of the capital city to win the title. Engfa represented the country at Miss Grand International 2022, where she placed as 1st Runner-Up.

Seventy-seven delegates, chosen by various provincial licensees through their provincial pageants, competed for the national title. The event was hosted by Matthew Deane and was beamed live to a virtual audience worldwide via the pageant YouTube channel, named GrandTV.

== Background ==
=== Location and date ===
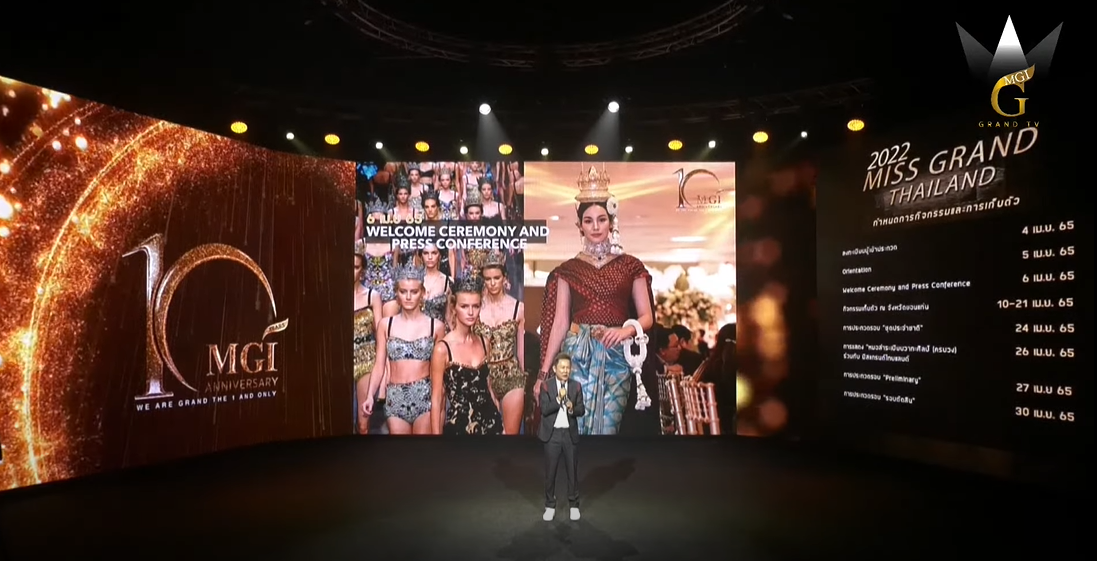
The Press Conference of the Miss Grand Thailand 2022, held on 17 January 2022 at the PM Center Office in Bangkok

The ninth edition of the Miss Grand Thailand beauty contest was originally scheduled to be held on 21 August 2021, however, the rising cases caused by SARS-CoV-2 Delta variant in Thailand during Mid-2021 caused the organizer to postpone the event to 11 September 2021 and eventually announce to skip the event to be arranged in April 2022 instead. The press conference of the contest was conducted at the PM Center office on 17 January, in which Khon Kaen was announced as the preliminary host province for the swimsuit contest, the darling of the host competition as well as all other ancillary activities during 10–21 April, and the Show DC Hall of Bangkok will be served as the venue for the national costume parade, preliminary competition, and the grand final coronation. Moreover, in the same event, the former Miss Grand Thailand Arayha Suparurk was authorized as the general director of the pageant, replacing Supaporn Malisorn, who served in such a position during 2019–2021.

On 14 February 2021, the pageant organizer Miss Grand International Co., Ltd. together with the Thai Fabric Promotion Association of Khon Kaen Province, Khon Kaen Tourist Business Association, and Khon Kaen Chamber of Commerce, signed a memorandum of understanding (MOU) to host the Miss Grand Thailand 2022 contest in Khon Kaen under the concept of ′The Iconic of Khon Kaen′ aiming to promote the provincial tourism industry during the Songkran Festival, the traditional Thai New Year, held during 8–15 April at Sri Chan Road and Kaen Nakhon Lake in the center of Khon Kaen city.

List of the main events in the Miss Grand Thailand 2022 pageant
Location	Date	Event	Venue	Ref.
Preliminary host province: Khon Kaen (10–21 April)	13 April	Creative Isan Costume competition	Art and Culture Museum, Khon Kaen University	
Preliminary host province: Khon Kaen (10–21 April)	16 April	Swimsuit competition	Khon Kaen Hall, CentralPlaza Khon Kaen	
Preliminary host province: Khon Kaen (10–21 April)	17 April	Miss Darling of Khon Kaen contest	Khon Kaen Hall, CentralPlaza Khon Kaen	
Final venue: Bangkok (4 – 9, 22–30 April)	24 April	National Costume Parade	Show DC Hall, Huai Khwang	
Final venue: Bangkok (4 – 9, 22–30 April)	26 April	Miss Grand Morlam final round	Show DC Hall, Huai Khwang	
Final venue: Bangkok (4 – 9, 22–30 April)	27 April	Preliminary competition	Show DC Hall, Huai Khwang	
Final venue: Bangkok (4 – 9, 22–30 April)	30 April	Grand Final Coronation	Show DC Hall, Huai Khwang	

=== Selection of participants ===
Seventy-seven national delegates were selected through the provincial pageants, 52 events in total, held in 44 provinces by several local organizers, who in some cases are responsible for more than one province. The provincial winners hold the title "Miss Grand (Province)" for the year of their reign. Of which, one contestant was replaced after the original contestant; Aksarapak Chaiammart, who had been crowned Miss Grand Nakhon Sawan 2022, was due to represent the province but the health problem had to resign the title and was replaced by the first runner-up Aizryh Phipat.

Lists of the provincial pageants of Miss Grand Thailand 2022, by the coronation date
Location	Group	Date and Venue	No. of Candidates	No. of QF titles for the National Stage	Ref.
Total number of provincial pageant: 52 pageants, held in 44 provinces			Total: 721	Total: 77 titles	–
Phang Nga	South	13 March 2021 at Le Méridien Khao Lak Resort & Spa, Takua Pa	6	1 title: Miss Grand Phang Nga	
Surat Thani	South	20 March 2021 at Nipa Garden Hotel, Surat Thani	10	1 title: Miss Grand Surat Thani	
Phetchabun	North	3 April 2021 at Breeze Hill Resort, Khao Kho	20	3 titles: Miss Grand Phetchabun; Miss Grand Nakhon Sawan; Miss Grand Phichit	
Sukhothai	North	3 April 2021 at Porncharoen Resort & Spa, Kong Krailat, Sukhothai	9	1 title: Miss Grand Sukhothai	
Phrae	North	12 April 2021 at Huern Na Na Boutique Hotel, Phrae	14	2 titles: Miss Grand Phrae; Miss Grand Nan	
Ubon Ratchathani	Northeast	24 April 2021 at The Eastern University Of Management and Technology	20	1 title: Miss Grand Ubon Ratchathani	
Pathum Thani	Central	Event 1: 13 June 2021 at iResidence Hotel, Khlong Luang	17	1 title: Miss Grand Pathum Thani	
Pathum Thani	Central	Event 2: 6 February 2022 at ESC Park Hotel, Khlong Luang, Pathum Thani	13	1 title: Miss Grand Bangkok	
Nonthaburi	Central	Event 1: 20 June 2021 at Westgate Residence Hotel, Bang Yai	12	1 title: Miss Grand Nonthaburi	
Nonthaburi	South	Event 2: 12 February 2022 at Sak Siam Lakeside Resort, Sai Noi	9	3 titles: Miss Grand Pattani; Miss Grand Yala; Miss Grand Narathiwat	
Bangkok	Central	Event 1: 27 June 2021 at Mirinn Theater, RCA Plaza, Bangkok	10	1 title: Miss Grand Samut Sakhon	
Bangkok	Central	Event 2: 26 January 2022 at Mirin Club, Royal City Avenue, Bangkok	16	1 title: Miss Grand Nakhon Nayok	
Bangkok	Northeast	Event 3: 13 February at Compost Studio, Wang Thonglang	5	1 title: Miss Grand Nakhon Phanom	
Bangkok	Northeast	Event 4: 16 February 2022 at Varavela Garden Hall, Bueng Kum, Bangkok	7	1 title: Miss Grand Buriram	
Bangkok	Central	Event 5: 16 February 2022 at Varavela Garden Hall, Bueng Kum, Bangkok	13	2 titles: Miss Grand Chanthaburi; Miss Grand Trat	
Bangkok	Central	Event 6: 28 February 2022 at RMUTP Hall – Thewet Campus, Bangkok	10	1 title: Miss Grand Saraburi	
Kanchanaburi	Central	27 June 2021 at Robinson Department Store, Kanchanaburi	15	1 title: Miss Grand Kanchanaburi	
Khon Kaen	Northeast	28 June 2021 at Pullman Khon Kaen Raja Orchid Hotel, Khon Kaen	26	1 title: Miss Grand Khon Kaen	
Samut Prakan	Central	29 June 2021 at Rimkhobfa Urban Resort, Samut Prakan	20	3 titles: Miss Grand Samut Prakan; Miss Grand Samut Songkhram; Miss Grand Nakhon Pathom	
Amnat Charoen	Northeast	30 June 2021 at Mahidol University Amnat Charoen Campus	13	1 title: Miss Grand Amnat Charoen	
Udon Thani	Northeast	11 July 2021 at Montatip Hall, Udon Thani	20	1 title: Miss Grand Udon Thani	
Sisaket	Northeast	26 July 2021 – Virtual pageant	15	1 title: Miss Grand Sisaket	
Chachoengsao	Central	14 November 2021 at Suntara Wellness Resort and Hotel, Chachoengsao	11	1 title: Miss Grand Chachoengsao	
Kalasin	Northeast	28 November 2021 at Kalasin University Auditorium, Kalasin	22	2 titles: Miss Grand Kalasin; Miss Grand Maha Sarakham	
Roi Et	Northeast	19 December 2021 at Petcharat Garden Hotel, Roi Et	20	1 title: Miss Grand Roi Et	
Chiang Mai	North	Event 1: 23 December 2021 at Chiangmai Hall, CentralPlaza Chiang Mai Airport	20	1 title: Miss Grand Chiang Mai	
Chiang Mai	North	Event 2: 27 December 2021 at Maya Lifestyle Shopping Center, Chiang Mai	12	2 titles: Miss Grand Lamphun; Miss Grand Lampang	
Chiang Rai	North	25 December 2021 at The Riverie by Katathani Chiang Rai Resort, Chiang Rai	13	1 title: Miss Grand Chiang Rai	
Nong Khai	Northeast	31 December 2021 at Nongkhai Tavilla Hotel and Convention Center, Nong Khai	14	1 title: Miss Grand Nong Khai	
Phayao	North	14 January 2022 at Tops Plaza Phayao, Phayao	10	1 title: Miss Grand Phayao	
Loei	Northeast	16 January 2022 at Loei Palace Hotel, Loei	18	4 titles: Miss Grand Loei; Miss Grand Bueng Kan; Miss Grand Nong Bua Lam Phu; Miss Grand Sakon Nakhon	
Suphan Buri	Central	30 January 2022 at Suan Dusit University – Suphan Buri Campus	10	1 title: Miss Grand Suphan Buri	
Phitsanulok	North	31 January 2022 at CentralPlaza Phitsanulok, Phitsanulok	16	2 titles: Miss Grand Phitsanulok; Miss Grand Uttaradit	
Nakhon Si Thammarat	South	6 February 2022 at The Gold Living Life, Thung Song	16	1 title: Miss Grand Nakhon Si Thammarat	
Surin	Northeast	6 February 2022 at Thong Tarin Hotel, Surin	7	1 title: Miss Grand Surin	
Yasothon	Northeast	12 February 2022 at J.P. Emerald Hotel, Yasothon	20	2 titles: Miss Grand Yasothon; Miss Grand Mukdahan	
Kamphaeng Phet	North	15 February 2022 at Maeung District Office Multipurpose Yard, Kamphaeng Phet	11	1 title: Miss Grand Kamphaeng Phet	
Nakhon Ratchasima	Northeast	19 February 2022 at Variety Hall, The Mall Nakhon Ratchasima	9	1 title: Miss Grand Nakhon Ratchasima	
Phuket	South	19 February 2022 at Ramada Plaza Chao Fah, Wichit, Phuket	9	1 title: Miss Grand Phuket	
Phra Nakhon Si Ayutthaya	Central	20 February 2022 at Central Ayutthaya, Phra Nakhon Si Ayutthaya	18	2 titles: Miss Grand Lopburi; Miss Grand Phra Nakhon Si Ayutthaya	
Chaiyaphum	Northeast	20 February 2022 at Chaiyaphum Park Hotel, Chaiyaphum	16	1 title: Miss Grand Chaiyaphum	
Mae Hong Son	North	20 February 2022 at Imperial Mae Hong Son Hotel, Mae Hong Son	6	1 title: Miss Grand Mae Hong Son	
Ranong	South	20 February 2022 at Jansom Beach Resort, Ranong	7	2 titles: Miss Grand Krabi; Miss Grand Ranong	
Ratchaburi	South	22 February 2022 at Khum Damnoen Resort, Damnoen Saduak, Ratchaburi	15	2 titles: Miss Grand Ratchaburi; Miss Grand Phetchaburi	
Prachuap Khiri Khan	South	24 February 2022 at Holiday Inn Resort Vana Nava, Hua Hin	13	1 title: Miss Grand Prachuap Khiri Khan	
Uthai Thani	North	24 February 2022 at Avatarn Miracles Hotel, Ban Rai	12	2 titles: Miss Grand Uthai Thani; Miss Grand Tak	
Prachinburi	Central	25 February 2022 at Tawarawadee Resort, Si Maha Phot	15	2 titles: Miss Grand Prachinburi; Miss Grand Sa Kaeo	
Trang	South	25 February 2022 at Robinson Lifestyle Trang Department Store, Trang	15	4 titles: Miss Grand Trang; Miss Grand Songkhla; Miss Grand Phatthalung; Miss Grand Satun	
Rayong	Central	26 February 2022 at Star Convention Hotel, Rayong	17	2 titles: Miss Grand Rayong; Miss Grand Ang Thong	
Chonburi	Central	26 February 2022 at CentralFestival Pattaya Beach, Pattaya	28	1 title: Miss Grand Chonburi	
Chumphon	South	27 February 2022 at Nana Buri Hotel, Chumphon	8	1 title: Miss Grand Chumphon	
Lopburi	Central	27 February 2022 at O2 Hotel, Lopburi	13	2 titles: Miss Grand Chai Nat; Miss Grand Sing Buri	
Total number of provincial pageant: 52 pageants, held in 44 provinces			Total: 721	Total: 77 titles	–

== Competition ==
Section Contents; Click on a title to go to the specific content
• Pre-pageant activities	• Miss Grand Morlam Contest	• Pond's Challenge	• Isan Costume Contest
• Swimsuit Contest	• Miss Darling of Khon Kaen	• Devonte's Challenge	• Wink White's Challenge
• National Costume Parade	• Miss Popular Vote	• Preliminary Competition	• Grand Final

=== Pre-pageant activities ===
==== Pre-pageant voting ====
Before the start of the national pageant, public online voting was held on the pageants' official Facebook page, aiming to determine the top 2 winners of each region groups, 8 in total. The result found that the candidates of Chiang Mai, Lampang, Nakhon Pathom, Nonthaburi, Amnat Charoen, Udon Thani, Kanchanaburi, and Surat Thani, were announced as the winner of the first challenging event. All of them received the organizer's special gift set as a reward.

Later in late April 2022, two weeks before the beginning of the pageant boot camp, the second public online voting challenge was additionally launched to select 10 winners, regardless of the geographical region, for joining a special meeting with the president of the contest Nawat Itsaragrisil on 8 March, the voting result is shown below;

The Best of Misses voting winners
Northern:	Chiang Mai	Lampang
Central:	Nakhon Pathom	Nonthaburi
Northeastern:	Amnat Charoen	Udon Thani
Southern:	Kanchanaburi	Surat Thani

Pre-arrival voting result
Winners:	Bangkok	Chonburi	Chumphon	Kanchanaburi	Lampang
Winners:	Lamphun	Nonthaburi	Phuket	Surat Thani	Udon Thani
Top 20:	Chiang Mai	Chiang Rai	Kalasin	Nakhon Sawan	Phrae
Top 20:	Roi Et	Satun	Trat	Yasothon	Prachuap Khiri Khan

==== Ancillary activities ====
In addition to the sub-contests and challenge events, several ancillary events were programmed to be arranged in this edition, such as a sponsor photo shoot, sightseeing, as well as doing charitable events. One of which, Miss Grand Land Road – a public Marathon charitable event, co-organized by the Student Union of Khon Kaen University (KKUSU) and the Miss Grand International Limited, originally scheduled to happen on 10 April at Khon Kaen University, was entirely canceled due to the serious situation of the COVID-19 pandemic in the preliminary host province.

On 5 April 14 national entrances were favorably chosen by Ramsita the main sponsor of the contest, to take the photo shoot used for their commercial purposes, the provinces of those eligible candidates is listed below.

- Bangkok
- Chiang Mai
- Chonburi
- Chumphon
- Kanchanaburi
- Khon Kaen
- Lampang
- Lopburi
- Nakhon Phanom
- Nan
- Pathum Thani
- Phuket
- Suphanburi
- Surat Thani

On the official welcome ceremony night held at Show DC Hall on 9 April, in addition to publicizing the competition details, the event also featured the formal Thai national costume and the creative swimsuit fashion shows worn by seventy-seven national aspirants. Moreover, the presentation of the modern Thai silk dress by the mentioned candidates was also founded at the "Gala Night Thai Silk", arranged in Avani Khon Kaen Hotel & Convention Centre on the following 11 March. In partnership with Netflix, the pageant contents will also be accessible on such a platform; some candidates were elected to shoot the advertising media, namely the representative of Ang Thong, Chumphon, and Phuket.

=== Sub-contests and special awards ===
==== Miss Grand Morlam contest ====
Miss Grand Morlam Rising Star Winners

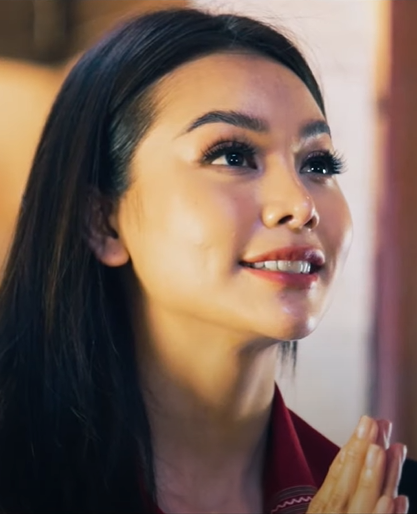
Bangkok
Engfa Waraha

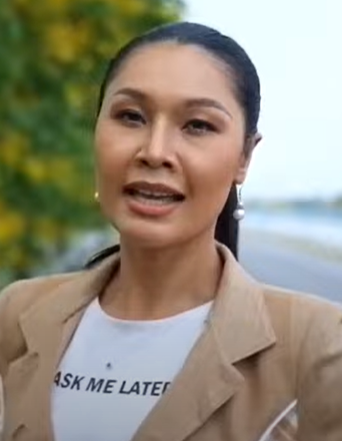
Prachinburi
Mueanphan Kunket

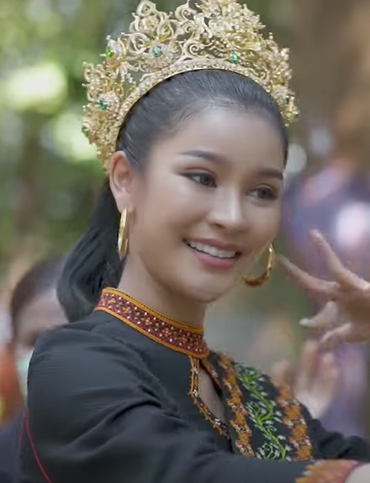
Sisaket
Kittiyaporn Lanont

The preliminary round of the Miss Grand Morlam Rising Star was held on 6 April 2022 at Hotel Swissôtel Bangkok Ratchada, in which the panel of judges affiliated with the Mor lam music band "Prathom Bunterng Silp" (Thai: ประถมบันเทิงศิลป์) select the finalists based on their Mor lam-related performances. Fifty out of the seventy-seven national finalists voluntarily took part in this sub-contest, only 3 candidates were classified for the further round; including Engfa Waraha of Bangkok, Mueanphan Kunket of Prachinburi, and Kittiyaporn Lanont of Sisaket. The event was hosted by Sakul Limpapanon, Mister Eco International Thailand 2018.

The judging panel of the event includes;

- Phakdee Pollam – Prathom Bunterng Silp band leader
- Ukondetch Patchim – Prathom Bunterng Silp performer
- Top Thanachai – Prathom Bunterng Silp performer
- Torchok Sirichai – Prathom Bunterng Silp performer
- Mack Natnarin – Prathom Bunterng Silp MC
- Teerawat Jiangkam – Prathom Bunterng Silp performance trainer
- Hotty Thaweesak – Prathom Bunterng Silp performer
- Sukanya Lunthaisong – Prathom Bunterng Silp performer
- Krissaneerat Saentrong – Prathom Bunterng Silp performer
- Nawat Itsaragrisil – Miss Grand International Ltd. president

The final round of the contest was organized with the full show of Prathom Bunterng Silp band on 26 April at Show DC Hall in Huai Khwang, also hosted by "Sakul Limpapanon" and was beamed live on Facebook as a pay-to-access event. All three finalist of the contest performed their Morlam skill featuring the main artist of the band, however, all these finalists was later named the winners on the national coronation night on 30 April, and receive the prize of ฿50,000 Baht cash each (approx. US$1,500). The winner of the Miss Grand Morlam contest has to sign the contract to work as the Mor lam performer for the aforementioned music band for 1 year.

The final competition result is shown below;

Miss Grand Morlam winners:	Bangkok	Prachinburi	Sisaket
Top 6	Ratchaburi	Loei	Nong Bua Lamphu

Miss Grand Morlam Contest final round detail
Finalist candidate	Featuring Morlam artist	Opening song	Solo song	Duet song
Bangkok – Engfa Waraha	Torchok Sirichai (Banlu Meesri)	Ngai Ngong (Thai: ไหง่ง่อง; English: Chaotically); Original artists: Takkatan Chollada	Waeb Waeb (Thai: แว็บ แว็บ; English: Sparkling); Original artist: Ann Oradee Petchbanphaeng	Re Wat Ta Hak Na Lee La Wa Dee (Thai: เรวัตตะฮักนะลีลาวดี; English: I [Rewatta] love you, Leelawadee); Original artists: Vieng Narumon and Beer Prompong
Prachinburi – Mueanphan Kunket	Top Thanachai	Ngai Ngong (Thai: ไหง่ง่อง; English: Chaotically); Original artists: Takkatan Chollada	Saw Nam Phong Hong Hai (Thai: สาวน้ำพองฮ้องให้; English: Crying Nam Phong Girl); Original artist: Kuhlabdaeng Hnamkhom	Re Wat Ta Hak Na Lee La Wa Dee (Thai: เรวัตตะฮักนะลีลาวดี; English: I [Rewatta] love you, Leelawadee); Original artists: Vieng Narumon and Beer Prompong
Sisaket – Kittiyaporn Lanont	Top Narakorn	Ngai Ngong (Thai: ไหง่ง่อง; English: Chaotically); Original artists: Takkatan Chollada	Phua Ma (Thai: ผัวมา; English: My Hubby is coming!); Original artist: Kung Supaporn Sairak	Re Wat Ta Hak Na Lee La Wa Dee (Thai: เรวัตตะฮักนะลีลาวดี; English: I [Rewatta] love you, Leelawadee); Original artists: Vieng Narumon and Beer Prompong

==== Miss Pond's Fresh Face challenge ====
Winner
Miss Pond's Fresh Face
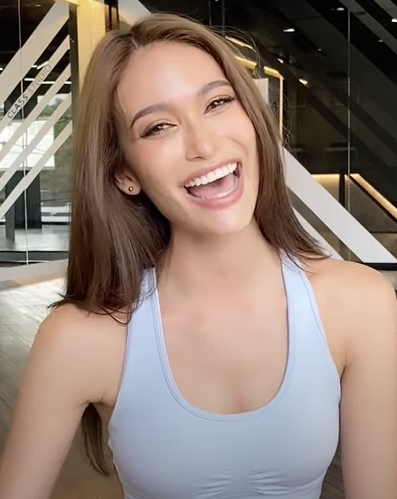
Phuket
Amanda Jensen

The Miss Pond's Fresh Face (Thai: มิสพอนด์สหน้าสดสวย) challenging event was held by the Unilever Thailand on 6 April 2022 at Hotel Swissôtel Bangkok Ratchada, in which the 77 aspirants of the national tilt appeared without makeup for the judging for the Miss Pond's Fresh Face title. "Amanda Jensen" of Phuket was later announced the challenging winner on the grand coronational round at Show DC Hall on 30 April.

The judging panel of the event includes;

- Chatthaporn Wongkhempet – Pond's Thailand brand manager
- Kanlaya Kunathip – Research and development senior manager of Unilever Thailand
- Patteerat Laemluang – actor and social media influencer
- Arayha Suparurk – Miss Grand Thailand general director

The winner of the Miss Pond's Fresh Face challenge received the prize of ฿100,000 Baht cash (approx. US$3,000) and has to sign a 1-year contract to work as the brand ambassador for Pond's Thailand.

Miss Pond's Fresh Face:	Phuket – Amanda Jensen
Top 6	Bangkok	Chaiyaphum	Chumphon	Khon Kaen	Udon Thani
Top 10	Ang Thong	Kanchanaburi	Sisaket	Uthai Thani

==== Isan Costume competition ====
Winner
Isan Creative Costume
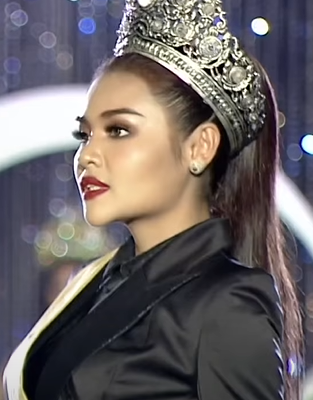
Surin
Pa-ornrat Pinmueang

Under the collaboration between Miss Grand International Limited and Khon Kaen University, the Isan creative costume competition was held on the outdoor stage of the Art and Culture Museum in Khon Kaen University on 13 March, in which 77 national candidates competed in creative style Isan costumes sewed by different local designers. The representative of Surin, Pa-ornrat Pinmueang, was named the winner at the end of the event and received cash of ฿100,000 Baht (approx. US$3,000) as a prize. Pinmueang wore the Galemore witch apparel (Thai: แกลมอ) of Kuy people, an indigenous ethnic group in Surin province. The event was hosted by Arthit Mekarkard Mister National Thailand 2016 and Sakul Limpapanon Mister Eco International Thailand 2018.

The judging panel includes;

- Charnchai Panthongwiriyakul – The President of Khon Kaen University
- Niyom Wongphongkham – Vice President for Arts & Culture and Creative Economy, Khon Kaen University
- Boonyarit Panitrungreaung – Deputy Mayor of Khon Kaen Municipality
- Sunisa Suwannawong – Hotel Manager Avani Khon Kaen Hotel & Convention Centre
- Pratchaya Tongtangthai – Khon Kaen Provincial Council Member
- Suraprapa Chantarapapaporn – Aura Rich (Thailand) Co., Ltd. Director
- Chidchonlatarn Chaisingha – Krit Consultant Co., Ltd. Chairman
- Sirin Prasertsang – Chaonang (Thailand) Co., Ltd. Chairman's Secretary
- Saruta Khankaew – Royal Gateway Co., Ltd. Senior Brand Executive
- Jirapun Watcharajindapat – Jirapun Together Co., Ltd. Manager

The competition result is shown below;

Best Isan Creative Costume:	Surin – Pa-ornrat Pinmueang
Top 5	Chiang Rai	Kanchanaburi	Pathum Thani	Ranong

==== Swimsuit contest ====
Winner
Best in Swimsuit
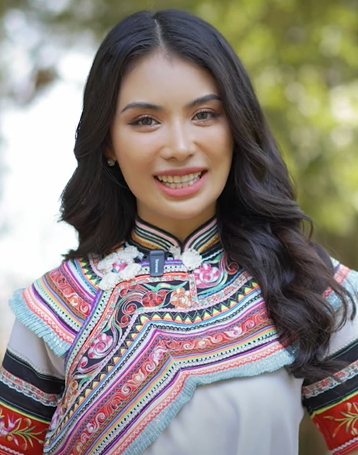
Chiang Mai
Athita Payak

The swimsuit contest of the Miss Grand Thailand 2022 pageant was done on 16 April 2022, hosted by Pamela Pasinetti Miss Grand Thailand 2017, and was beamed live to a virtual audience via the official YouTube channel, named GrandTV, and its Facebook Live coverage from the Khon Kaen Hall of CentralPlaza Khon Kaen in Khon Kaen. Each national delegate wore the same type of swimsuit designed by the organizer and paraded one by one in front of the panel of judges. The score for this event, together with the swimsuit section on the preliminary stage on 27 April was used to determine the "Best in Swimsuit" winner, which was later announced on the national final stage on 30 April, the representative of Chiang Mai, Athita Payak, is the conqueror of such.

In addition to searching for the aforementioned title, the event was also used to determine the first 8 finalists who will advance to compete for the "Devonte Men's Women Style" title, the winner of which will obtain cash of ฿500,000 Baht (approx. USD15,000) as a prize and has to sign a 1-year contract to serve as the ambassador for the brand.

The judging panel includes;

- Nathapat Moonlao – Host province license holder for Miss Grand Thailand 2022
- Thanatch Harinthajinda – Host province license holder for Miss Grand Thailand 2022
- Kittikun Tansuhat – Devonte Brand Ambassador
- Nawat Itsaragrisil – The president of Miss Grand International Limited

==== Miss Darling of Khon Kaen contest ====
Winner
Miss Darling of Khon Kaen
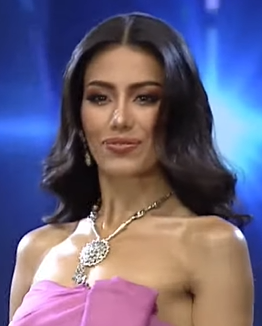
Ang Thong
Ornpreeya Nesa Mahmoodi

The competition for the annual special title of "Miss Darling of Khon Kaen" (Thai: มิสแกรนด์ขวัญใจขอนแก่น) was held on 17 April at Khon Kaen Hall of CentralPlaza Khon Kaen, and beamed live worldwide to a virtual audience via the organizer YouTube channel, aiming to determine the most favorite candidate for the pageant host province. The event was hosted by Arthit Mekakard, Mister National Thailand 2016, and Pamela Pasinetti Miss Grand Thailand 2017. According to all previous editions of Miss Grand Thailand, the winners of "Miss Darling of the Host province" always secure their position among the top 5 finalists at the final national contest.

The contestants were classified under four geographical regions namely; northern, northeastern, central, and southern, regardless of the government administrative regions, each group consisted of 17, 20, 22, and 18 provinces, respectively. Each delegate was introduced in the first opening parade with the same style of simple Isan costume and then competed in the evening gown round. Five contestants with the highest accumulation points from each region advanced to the top 20 round, and only two delegates of each regional group qualified for the further round. The winner of the fast track (automatic advancement) title, "Miss G-Rich", which was chosen by one of the event's sponsors, as well as the winner of "Miss Popularity", were automatically placed among the top 10 finalists, where all entrants were asked the same question about a Thai politician recently accused of sexual harassment. After the first Q&A round, the judges then selected the top five candidates regardless of the regional groups to compete in the final question-and-answer portion which all top 5 finalists were questioned about the problem related to the Khon Kaen local government administration and other national political issues. At the end of the event, a 21-year-old Thai-Iranian, "Ornpreeya Nesa Mahmoodi" of Ang Thong province was named the winner and received cash of ฿50,000 Baht as a prize, and the first runner-up is belonging to the representative of Bangkok "Engfa Waraha" who received a prize of ฿20,0000 Baht for such position while all other three of top 5 finalists from Nan, Khon Kaen and Chonburi were announced the second runners-up and obtained cash of ฿10,0000 Baht each.

The judging panel includes;

- Boonyarit Panitrungreaung – Deputy Mayor of Khon Kaen Municipality
- Sunisa Suwannawong – Hotel Manager Avani Khon Kaen Hotel & Convention Centre
- Nisa Chapupuang – CentralPlaza Khon Kaen general manager
- Prasit Tongtangthai – Khon Kaen Provincial Council Member
- Yupparat Duangdeethaweesup – President of the Thai Cloth Promotion Association, Khon Kaen
- Nantiya Sirikarnthananan – President of Rotary Club of Friendship, Khon Kaen
- Supasara Siriboonrat – President of the Association of Women Businessmen and Professionals, Khon Kaen Province
- Dampawan Lajoy – Vice-chairman of the Federation of Thai Industries, Khon Kaen Province
- Patima Laochai – Chairman of the Maha Sarakham Chamber of Commerce
- Nipaporn Theerakanok – managing director of Nissan KKT Khon Kaen Co., Ltd.
- Suraprapa Chantarapapaporn – Director of Aura Rich (Thailand) Co., Ltd.
- Chidchonlatarn Chaisingha – Chairperson of Krit Consultant Co., Ltd.
- Thunthita Sapsiritarakul – Chairperson of Chaonang (Thailand) Co., Ltd.
- Saruta Khankaew – Royal Gateway Co., Ltd. Senior Brand Executive
- Jirapun Watcharajindapat – Manager of Jirapun Together Co., Ltd.
- Saranon Paisarnphan – Ida Clinic Manager
- Methawee Sornprasom – Ida Clinic Manager
- Panin Kitjunya – Warasiri Real Estate Project Manager
- Jintana Feuanthaisong – Manager of La Villa Co., Ltd.

In addition to crown the main title, the winners of other special awards given by the local organizer were also determined, as listed below.

- Miss Popularity – determined by the public vote in the event, the winner of which, "Engfa Waraha" of Bangkok, was automatically qualified for the top 10 finalists of the contest.
- Miss G-Rich – favorably chosen by the event sponsor, the title recipient "Amanda Jensen" of Phuket, was also automatically placed among the top 10 finalists at the event.
- Miss Healthy No Calorie – won by "Charlotte Austin" of Chumphon who received cash of ฿10,000 Baht as a prize (approx. USD300).
- Darling of Avila – obtained by "Sulax Siriphattharaphong" of Surat Thani, who carried out with the prize of ฿10,000 Baht.
- Darling of Avila Manager – the winner of which, "Suphatra Kliangprom" of Phrae, also received a cash of ฿10,000 Baht.

The competition results summary is shown in the diagram below.

Sub-contest: Miss Darling of Khon Kaen Placement Result

Round/Category
Quarterfinalists; Top 20
Semi-finalists; Top 10
Finalists; Top 5
Finalists; Placement specified

Northern Group (17 provinces)
Chiang Mai; Lampang; Nan; Phichit; Phrae
Chiang Mai; Nan; Phichit
Nan
Winner; Ang Thong

Northeastern Group (20 provinces)
Kalasin; Khon Kaen; Mukdahan; Nakhon Ratchasima; Sisaket
Khon Kaen; Mukdahan
Khon Kaen
1st runner-up Bangkok

Central Group (22 provinces)
Ang Thong; Bangkok; Chonburi; Pathum Thani; Samut Songkhram
Ang Thong; Chonburi
Ang Thong; Bangkok; Chonburi
2nd runner-up Nan

Southern Group (18 provinces)
Chumphon; Kanchanaburi; Krabi; Phuket; Prachuap Khiri Khan
Chumphon; Prachuap Khiri Khan
No Qualifier
2nd runner-up Khon Kaen

Fast Track (For top 10 round)
Phuket
2nd runner-up Chonburi

Popular Vote (For top 10 round)
Bangkok

==== Wink White's Challenge ====
Color keys

- Winner – Best Promoter
- Top 15

Team	Delegate 1	Delegate 2	Delegate 3	Delegate 4	Delegate 5	Delegate 6	Delegate 7
1	Bangkok	Krabi	Kanchanaburi	Kalasin	Kamphaeng Phet	Khon Kaen	Chanthaburi
2	Chachoengsao	Chonburi	Chai Nat	Chaiyaphum	Chumphon	Chiang Rai	Chiang Mai
3	Trat	Tak	Nakhon Nayok	Nakhon Pathom	Nakhon Phanom	Nakhon Ratchasima	—N/a
4	Nakhon Si Thammarat	Nakhon Sawan	Nonthaburi	Narathiwat	Nan	—N/a	—N/a
5	Pathum Thani	Prachuap Khiri Khan	Prachinburi	Phra Nakhon Si Ayutthaya	Phayao	Phang Nga	—N/a
6	Phatthalung	Phichit	Phitsanulok	Phetchabun	Phetchaburi	Phrae	Phuket
7	Maha Sarakham	Mukdahan	Mae Hong Son	Yala	Yasothon	Ranong	Roi Et
8	Ratchaburi	Lopburi	Lampang	Lamphun	Sisaket	—N/a	—N/a
9	Songkhla	Satun	Samut Prakan	Samut Sakhon	Sa Kaeo	—N/a	—N/a
10	Saraburi	Singburi	Suphanburi	Surat Thani	Surin	Nong Khai	—N/a
11	Nong Bua Lamphu	Ang Thong	Udon Thani	Uthai Thani	Uttaradit	Ubon Ratchathani	Amnat Charoen

==== Devonte's Challenge ====
Winner
Devonte's Men's Women Style
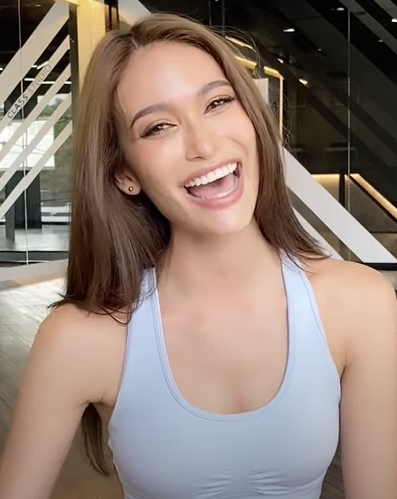
Phuket
Amanda Jensen

Devonte's Men was one of the sponsors of 2022 Miss Grand Thailand pageant. As a representative of the company, "Kittikun Tansuhat" attended the swimsuit contest held at Khon Kaen Hall of CentralPlaza Khon Kaen on 16 April, to determine 8 eligible candidates who later took part in several challenger events together with other 2 finalists selected through the public online voting. The challenge events aimed to select the winner who will serve as its brand ambassador for 1 year. The representative of Phuket, Amanda Jensen, was named the challenging winner on the final night competition on 30 April at Show DC Hall, Bangkok, and received 500,000 Baht (approx. USD15,000) in cash as a reward.

The company also held another challenge event on 18 April where all contestants were randomly divided into 10 groups of 7 each, then all groups were assigned to take the photoshoot with the company representative. The final result found that group 8 which consisted of the representatives from Chiang Mai, Chiang Rai, Kamphaeng Phet, Nakhon Phanom, Phrae, Saraburi and Tak provinces, was selected as the winner and received 70,000 baht in cash as a reward.

In addition to the aforementioned challenges, Devonte and the pageant organizer also provided the pocket money to 9 candidates chosen by a randomly drawn, as well as offered a 1-day special tour within the host province to other 7 candidates, all chosen delegates and the summary of the challenger selective system are shown below.

1-day Special Tour
Kanchanaburi	Lopburi	Nan
Samut Prakan	Phetchaburi	Phrae
Ubon Ratchathani

Special Pocket Money
Chanthaburi	Krabi	Nong Bua Lamphu
Phatthalung	Ranong	Rayong
Ratchaburi	Samut Prakan	Uthai Thani

Devonte's Challenging events

Brand Ambassador; Scouting	Photoshoot; Challenge
Stage/Method	Devonte's Selection	Public Vote	Team	Team 1	Team 2	Team 3	Team 4	Team 5
Result	Top 5	Top 5	D/Q	D/Q	Top 5
Stage 1 Top 10	Ang Thong; Chiang Mai; Kalasin; Kanchanaburi; Khon Kaen; Phrae; Phuket; Surat Thani	Bangkok; Chumphon	Member	Bangkok; Chachoengsao; Kanchanaburi; Phetchabun; Satun; Uthai Thani; Yasothon	Kalasin; Lamphun; Maha Sarakham; Nakhon Nayok; Narathiwat; Roi Et; Suphanburi	Chonburi; Nakhon Ratchasima; Nakhon Si Thammarat; Nan; Nonthaburi; Phatthalung; Prachuap Khiri Khan	Chanthaburi; Chumphon; Nakhon Pathom; Nong Bua Lamphu; Phuket; Samut Sakhon; Ubon Ratchathani	Amnat Charoen; Ang Thong; Krabi; Phayao; Phichit; Sisaket; Surin
Team	Team 6	Team 7	Team 8	Team 9	Team 10
Result	D/Q	D/Q	WINNER	Top 5	D/Q
Stage 2 Top 5	Chumphon; Phrae; Phuket; Ang Thong	Bangkok	Member	Mukdahan; Nakhon Sawan; Phang Nga; Ratchaburi; Songkhla; Surat Thani; Trat	Chaiyaphum; Chai Nat; Mae Hong Son; Pathum Thani; Phetchaburi; Sa Kaeo; Udon Thani	Chiang Mai; Chiang Rai; Kamphaeng Phet; Nakhon Phanom; Phrae; Saraburi; Tak	Khon Kaen; Lopburi; Nong Khai; Prachinburi; Ranong; Rayong; Samut Prakan	Ayutthaya; Lampang; Phitsanulok; Singburi; Uttaradit; Yala
Winner	Phuket

==== Best National Costume Parade ====
Contestants from all 77 provinces wore outfits representing the best identity of their home provinces in the "national costume" round of the Miss Grand Thailand 2022 pageant held on 24 April night at the Show DC Hall in Huai Khwang. The event was also beamed live to a virtual audience via the pageant's official YouTube channel, hosted by Pamela Pasinetti Miss Grand Thailand 2017 and Sakul Limpapanon, Mister Eco International Thailand 2018. For the adjudication process, 25 of 50 finalist costumes will be determined by popular choice through Instagram and Facebook voting from 24 to 27 April, while the remaining will be selected by the judges. Then the second selection process will be operated to select the last 25 costumes, 12 by public voting and the others by a panel of judges. Five winning costumes will be announced on the grand final round on 30 April and rewarded a ฿100,000 Baht cash each, with the fourteen runners-up will receive 30,000 baht each.

The competition result is shown below;

Best National Costumes:		Chachoengsao			Lopburi
(5 costumes)		Phetchabun			Rayong
		Surin
Runners-up		Bangkok	Lamphun	Kalasin	Kanchanaburi	Krabi
(14 costumes)		Nakhon Nayok	Nan	Nonthaburi	Pathum Thani	Nakhon Ratchasima
		Ratchaburi	Samut Prakan	Samut Sakhon	Udon Thani
Top 25	By public vote:	Chumphon	Narathiwat	Phrae	Phuket	Satun
	By panel of judges:	Nakhon Phanom
Top 50	By public vote:	Amnat Charoen	Ang Thong	Chiang Mai	Chiang Rai	Khon Kaen
		Nakhon Sawan	Phichit	Roi Et	Surat Thani
	By panel of judges:	Ayutthaya	Chaiyaphum	Kamphaeng Phet	Lampang	Loei
		Maha Sarakham	Mae Hong Son	Mukdahan	Nakhon Pathom	Prachuap Khiri Khan
		Phatthalung	Phayao	Phitsanulok	Ranong	Sa Kaeo
		Uttaradit

Featured costumes

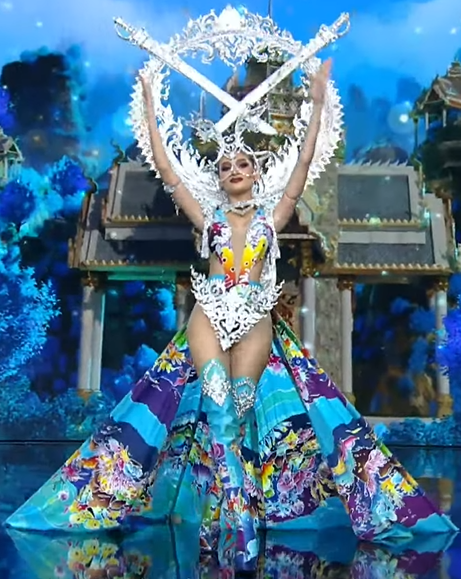
Krabi
Inspired by two ancient crossed swords (krabi) discovered in the province.

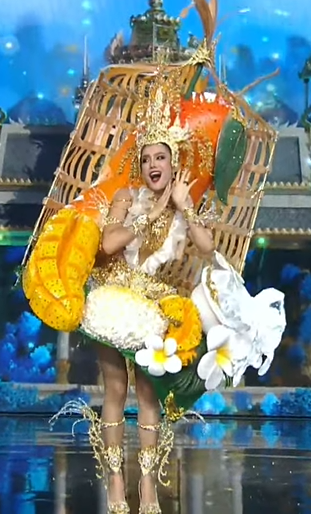
Kalasin
Mahachanok Mango costume, as wearing by Tanawan Wigg.

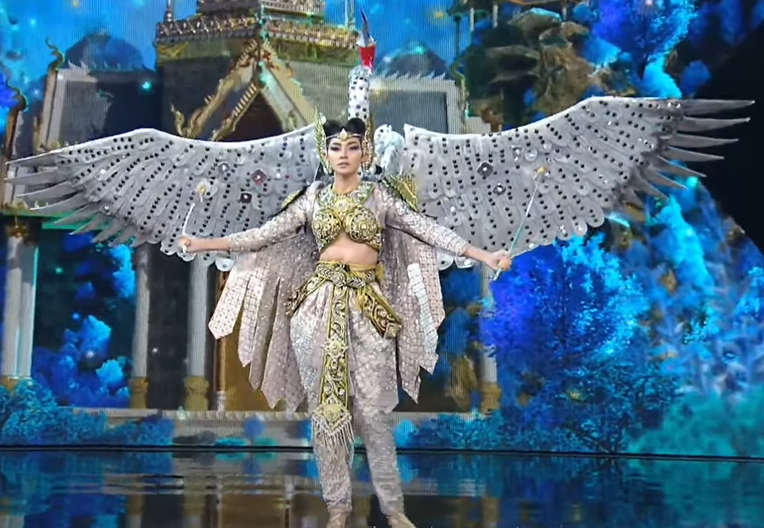
Nakhon Ratchasima
Inspired by Sarus crane, a vulnerable species rarely seen in the province.

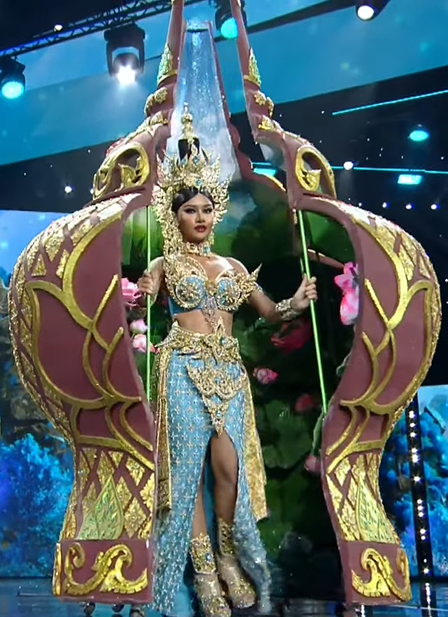
Pathum Thani
Inspired by the Benchasiri pottery of Mon people, decorated inside by pink lotus, the symbol of the province.

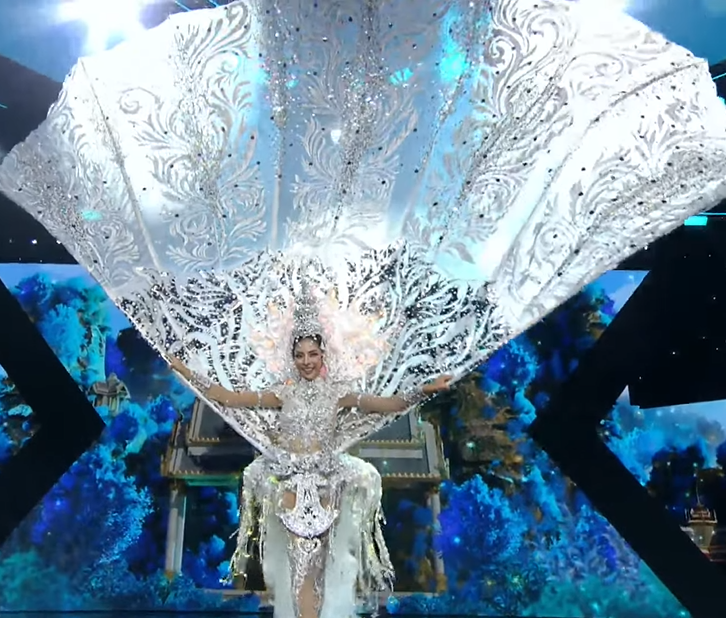
Phetchabun
Freshwater Jellyfish costumes, inspired by Craspedacusta sowerbyi, the only species of Craspedacusta genus found in Thailand, mainly in Phetchabun province.

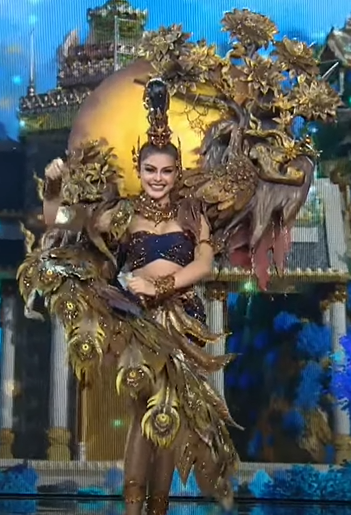
Phrae
Carved wooden peacock costume, made from golden teak by Lanna craftsmen in the province.

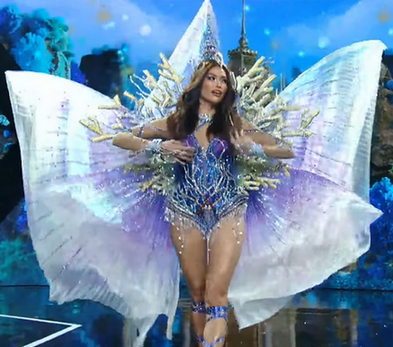
Phuket
Tropical coral costume, represents the stunning aquatic world of Phuket's Andaman Sea.

==== Miss Popular Vote ====
Winner
Miss Popular Vote
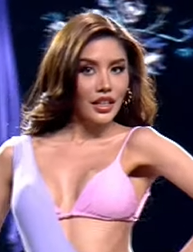
Nonthaburi
Thiphayaporn Phomraj

The winner of the "Miss Popular Vote" was determined via a public paid voting on the official Facebook page of the pageant (฿100 Baht – approx. USD3 – for each point) during the period of the pageant camp. The representative of Nonthaburi, Thiphayaporn Phomraj, was named the winner and automatically qualified for the top 10 finalists at the grand final round, held on 30 April at Show DC Hall of Bangkok.

First Reveal 16 April 2022
Rank	+/-	Province	Rank	+/-	Province
1	▲1	Nonthaburi	11	Steady	Prachuap Khiri Khan
2	▼1	Bangkok	12	Steady	Chiang Rai
3	Steady	Surat Thani	13	Steady	Udon Thani
4	Steady	Chumphon	14	Steady	Phayao
5	Steady	Phuket	15	Steady	Lamphun
6	Steady	Ang Thong	16	Steady	Kamphaeng Phet
7	Steady	Songkhla	17	Steady	Sisaket
8	Steady	Phrae	18	Steady	Ubon Ratchathani
9	Steady	Lopburi	19	Steady	Nakhon Pathom
10	Steady	Samut Sakhon	20	Steady	Nakhon Sawan

==== Miss Grand Best Seller ====
Color keys

- Winner – Miss Grand Best Seller

Result	Team	Delegate 1	Delegate 2	Delegate 3	Delegate 4
Winner	2	Khon Kaen	Chumphon	Nonthaburi	Pathum Thani
Top 2	1	Bangkok	Kalasin	Ratchaburi	Satun
Top 3	3	Nakhon Sawan	Phra Nakhon Si Ayutthaya	Phuket	Samut Sakhon

==== Other awards ====
The following list is the special awards provided in the Miss Grand Thailand 2022, the winners of such were either favorably or randomly selected by the pageant sponsors, no physical contest was being held.

Miss Hongthong
Providing organ:	VR Online Innovation Co., Ltd.
Selection criteria:	The contestant with the highest value of Thai lottery online purchase via the contestant link on "Hongthong.com" will be named the winner and receive cash of 66,666 Baht prize (approx. USD2,000).
Winner:	Uthai Thani
Top 3	Bangkok	Chumphon
Top5	Ang Thong	Amnat Charoen

Miss Flora
Providing organ:	Tepprathanporn Pharmacy Co., Ltd.
Selection criteria:	Favorably chosen
Winner:	Bangkok
1st runner-up:	Phuket
2nd runner-up:	Sakon Nakhon

Hongthong's Lucky Girl
Providing organ:	VR Online Innovation Co., Ltd.
Selection criteria:	If the last two digit prize of the Thai lottery on 2 May draw date match with the province competition code, the representative of such province will receive ฿100,000 Baht cash prize.
Winner:	Chonburi

=== Main pageant ===
==== Preliminary competition ====
The preliminary round of the Miss Grand Thailand 2022 pageant, which is usually used to determine the top 20 finalists, will happen on 27 April, at Show DC Hall, Bangkok. In which, all 77 contestants will compete in swimwear and evening gowns in front of a panel of preliminary judges. The scores from the preliminary event, together with a closed-door interview portion, the swimsuit competition as well as the scoring via all ancillary events, will determine the top 20 finalists who will be announced on the grand final stage on 30 April.

==== Grand final coronation ====
The winner of the contest will receive ฿1.2 million baht (approx. USD 36,783, to date) in cash and a condominium worth 1.8 million baht as prizes. Meanwhile, the 1st–4th runners-up will be offered ฿7.0, 6.0, 5.5, and 5.0 hundred thousand baht cash, respectively. Such the winner, as well as all runners-up, have to sign a contract to work with the company for 1 year. In addition, the remaining of the 10 finalists will receive a prize of ฿100,000 baht each, the first year that the organizers will award the prize to top 10 finalists.

=== Sponsorship ===
The following list is the main sponsorship for the Miss Grand Thailand 2022 pageant.

- A Best Estate Co., Ltd. – a Bangkok-based real estate development company.
- AJ Advance Pub Co., Ltd. – a Thai Stock Exchange-listed company that operated in procurement business sector and electrical devices distribution.
- Nova Organic Pub Co., Ltd. – a Thai Stock Exchange-listed company that operated in the personal care and pharmaceuticals sector.
- PM Gems and Diamond – a Thai jewellery manufacturer company.
- Regen SmartCity (Thailand) Co., Ltd. – an electrical equipment manufacturer company and the related-software developer.
- Thai Vietjet Air – a Thai low-cost airline and an associate company of Vietnamese airline VietJet Air.
- Theerathorn Clinic – a comprehensive plastic surgery clinic based in Bangkok.
- Unilever Thai Trading Co., Ltd. – a Thai-subsidiary of the multinational manufacturer company Unilever headquartered in London.
- VR Online Innovation Co., Ltd. – an online Thai government lottery dealer.
- Yaya Skincare (Thailand) Co., Ltd. – a cosmetic manufacturing company in Songkhla Province.
- TTC Siam Drinking Water Co., Ltd. – a mineral water manufacturer company based in Pathum Thani Province.

== Results ==
Color keys

- The contestant Won in an International pageant.
- The contestant was a Runner-up in an International pageant.
- The contestant was a Semi-Finalist in an International pageant.
- Unplaced

=== Placements ===
Miss Grand Thailand 2022 competition result
Placement	Contestant	International Placements
Miss Grand Thailand 2022	Bangkok – Engfa Waraha^{[π]}	1st runner up – Miss Grand International 2022
1st runner-up	Phuket – Amanda Jensen	Top 20 – Miss Intercontinental 2022
2nd runner-up	Kalasin – Tanawan Wigg	3rd runner up – The Miss Globe 2022
3rd runner-up	Ang Thong – Nesa Mahmoodi	
4th runner-up	Phrae – Suphatra Kliangprom^{[‡]}	Winner – Miss Tourism International 2022
5th runner-up	Chiang Mai – Athita Payak	1st runner up – Face of Beauty International 2023
5th runner-up	Chiang Rai – Malaika Khan	
5th runner-up	Chumphon – Charlotte Austin	
5th runner-up	Khon Kaen – Waranchana Radomlek	4th runner up – Face of Beauty International 2024
5th runner-up	Nonthaburi – Thiphayaporn Prommarach^{[∆]}	
Top 20	Chonburi – Watcharaporn Ruaypong; Kanchanaburi – Thansita Dilhokanansakul; Mukdahan – Marichsa Piuengam; Nakhon Sawan – Aizryh Phipat; Prachuap Khiri Khan – Kansuda Chanakeeree; Phra Nakhon Si Ayutthaya – Sunaree Chaimungkun; Lampang – Likhitpak Wijitsuwan; Sisaket – Kittiyaporn Lanont; Satun – Aksorn Benchanirat; Surin – Pa-ornrat Pinmueang	

Note

^∆ Automatically qualified for the Top 11 finalists after winning the fast track "Miss Popular vote".
^‡ Automatically qualified for the Top 11 finalists after winning the "Boss Choice" award.
^π Automatically qualified for the Top 5 finalists after winning the "Boss Choice" award.

=== Appointments ===
Title	Contestant	International Placement
Miss Chinese World Thailand 2023	Nakhon Pathom – Parithaniya Sarinsiyaporn	Top 5 – Miss Chinese World 2023
Miss Chinese World Thailand 2023	Sisaket – Kittiyaporn Lanont	Unplaced – Miss Chinese World 2023
Top Model of the World Thailand 2023	Lampang – Likhitpak Wijitsuwan	Top 6 – Top Model of the World 2023

=== Special awards ===
National awards

List of Miss Grand Thailand 2022 Special Award Winners
Award	Winner
Main Award: the winners of the following awards were determined directly by either the national organizer or pageant sponsors then were announced on the national grand final stage.
Best Isan Costume	Surin – Pa-ornrat Pinmueang
Best in Swimsuit	Chiang Mai – Athita Payak
Best Introduction	Uthai Thani – Achicha Mahasawat
Best Evening Gown^{[α]}	Nakhon Sawan – Aizryh Phipat
Best National Costume	Chachoengsao – Ratchaya Mingboon; Lopburi – Niratcha Namwatcharasopit; Phetchabun – Suthida Ninpai; Rayong – Chayanapas Chompoorat; Surin – Pa-ornrat Pinmueang
Best Director^{[β]}	Khon Kaen – Nathapat Moonlao
Miss Darling of Khon Kaen	Ang Thong – Ornpreeya Nesa Mahmoodi
Miss Grand Morlam Rising Star	Bangkok – Engfa Waraha; Prachinburi – Mueanphan Kunket; Sisaket – Kittiyaporn Lanont
Miss Photogenic	Bangkok – Engfa Waraha
Miss Popular Vote	Nonthaburi – Thiphayaporn Phomraj
Ancillary Award: the following award winner was determined through the challenging event held by the pageant sponsor, the title recipient was only announced at the end of such event.
Devonte Men's Women Style^{[γ]}	Phuket – Amanda Jensen
Miss Flora	Bangkok – Engfa Waraha
Miss Hongthong	Uthai Thani – Achicha Mahasawat
Hongthong's Lucky Girl	Chonburi – Watcharaporn Ruaypong
Miss Pond's Fresh Face^{[γ]}	Phuket – Amanda Jensen
Miss Wink White Beautiful Skin^{[γ]}	Bangkok – Engfa Waraha
Wink White's Best Promoter	Chumphon – Charlotte Austin
Note: 1. ^α Also known as the Best Designer award, which was given to the evening gown designer.; 2. ^β Award to the provincial director.; 3. ^γ Provided by the pageant sponsors, the winners of such have to serve as its brand ambassador for 1 year.

Host province special awards

Award	Winner
Miss Khon Kaen Popularity	Bangkok – Engfa Waraha
Miss G-Rich	Phuket – Amanda Jensen
Miss Darling of Avila	Surat Thani – Sulax Siriphattharaphong
Miss Darling of Avila Manager	Phrae – Suphatra Kliangprom
Miss Healthy No Calorie	Chumphon – Charlotte Austin
Note: All host province special awards was given on stage of the Miss Darling of Khon Kaen contest, no additionally announced in the national grand final.

=== Prizes summary ===
Position/Award	Prize
Main Placement:
Miss Grand Thailand 2022	฿1,200,000 Baht cash (approx. USD37,000); 1 unit of Condominium worth ฿1,800,000 Baht (approx. USD54,000); Jewelry and other gift vouchers
1st runner-up	฿700,000 Baht cash (approx. USD21,000); Jewelry and other gift vouchers
2nd runner-up	฿600,000 Baht cash (approx. USD18,000); Jewelry and other gift vouchers
3rd runner-up	฿550,000 Baht cash (approx. USD16,400); Jewelry and other gift vouchers
4th runner-up	฿500,000 Baht cash (approx. USD15,000); Jewelry and other gift vouchers
Top 10 finalists	฿100,000 Baht cash (approx. USD3,000); Jewelry and other gift vouchers
Top 20 finalists	฿20,000 Baht cash (approx. USD600; to each contestants advanced to the Top 20)
Main Special Awards:
Best Isan Creative Costume	฿100,000 Baht cash (approx. USD3,000)
Best in Swimsuit	฿100,000 Baht cash (approx. USD3,000)
Best Evening Gown	Winner: ฿100,000 Baht cash; 1st – 2nd Runners-up: ฿20,000 Baht cash each (approx. USD600)
Best National Costume	5 Winners: ฿100,000 Baht cash each; 1st – 14th Runners-up: ฿30,000 Baht cash each (approx. USD900)
Best Introduction	฿50,000 Baht cash
Miss Darling of Khon Kaen	Winner: ฿50,000 Baht cash; 1st Runner-up: ฿20,000 Baht cash; 2nd Runners-up: ฿10,000 Baht cash (approx. USD300)
Miss Grand Morlam Rising Star	฿100,000 Baht cash; 1-year employment contract
Miss Photogenic	฿50,000 Baht cash
Miss Popular Vote	฿50,000 Baht cash
Ancillary Awards:
Devonte Men's Women Style	฿500,000 Baht cash (approx. USD15,000)
Hongthong's Lucky Girl	฿100,000 Baht cash
Miss Darling of Avila	฿10,000 Baht cash
Miss Darling of Avila Manager	฿10,000 Baht cash
Miss Flora	Winner: ฿30,000 Baht cash; 1st Runner-up: ฿20,000 Baht cash; 2nd Runners-up: ฿10,000 Baht cash
Miss Grand Best Seller	฿100,000 Baht cash
Miss Healthy No Calorie	฿10,000 Baht cash
Miss Hongthong	฿66,666 Baht cash
Miss Pond's Fresh Face	฿100,0000 Baht cash; 1-year employment contract
Miss Wink White's Beautiful Face	
Miss Wink White's Best Promoter	฿50,000 Baht cash

=== Order of Announcement ===
Order of Announcement

Round/Category
Quarterfinalists; Top 20
Semifinalists; Top 10
Finalists; Top 5
Finalists; Placement specified

Popular Vote
Nonthaburi

Northern Group (17 provinces)
Lampang; Nakhon Sawan; Phrae; Chiang Mai; Chiang Rai
Chiang Rai; Chiang Mai
Phrae
4th runner-up Phrae

Northeastern Group (20 provinces)
Surin; Mukdahan; Khon Kaen; Sisaket; Kalasin
Khon Kaen; Kalasin
Kalasin
2nd runner-up Kalasin

Central Group (22 provinces)
Ang Thong; Chonburi; Ayutthaya; Bangkok; Nonthaburi
Ang Thong; Bangkok
Ang Thong
3rd runner-up Ang Thong

Southern Group (18 provinces)
Kanchanaburi; Satun; Phuket; Chumphon; Prachuap Khiri Khan
Phuket; Chumphon
The rest of top 10 were named 5th runners-up
Phuket
1st runner-up Phuket

Boss Choice
Phrae
Bangkok
Winner; Bangkok

== Candidates ==
77 contestants competed for the title of Miss Grand Thailand 2022:

Code	Province	Candidate	Age	Height	Group	National achievements	
Code	Province	Candidate	Age	Height	Group	Placement	Other achievements
MGT01	Bangkok	Engfa Waraha	27	1.71 m (5 ft 7 1/2 in)	Central	Miss Grand Thailand 2022	
MGT02	Krabi	Narisa Yisoon	22	1.73 m (5 ft 8 in)	Southern		
MGT03	Kanchanaburi	Thansita Dilhokanansakul	23	1.78 m (5 ft 10 in)	Southern	Top 20	
MGT04	Kalasin	Tanawan Wigg	21	1.73 m (5 ft 8 in)	Northeastern	2nd Runner-up	
MGT05	Kamphaeng Phet	Kitiyaporn Intai	24	1.70 m (5 ft 7 in)	Northern		
MGT06	Khon Kaen	Waranchana Radomle	25	1.75 m (5 ft 9 in)	Northeastern	Top 10	
MGT07	Chanthaburi	Warintorn Phupadrae	23	1.74 m (5 ft 8 1/2 in)	Central		
MGT08	Chachoengsao	Ratchaya Mingboon	22	1.75 m (5 ft 9 in)	Central		
MGT09	Chonburi	Watcharaporn Ruaypong	25	1.76 m (5 ft 9 1/2 in)	Central	Top 20	
MGT10	Chai Nat	Kattaleeya Matiyapak	27	1.67 m (5 ft 5 1/2 in)	Central		
MGT11	Chaiyaphum	Orakanya Pong-amphai	20	1.71 m (5 ft 7 1/2 in)	Northeastern		
MGT12	Chumphon	Charlotte Austin	23	1.72 m (5 ft 7 1/2 in)	Southern	Top 10	
MGT13	Chiang Rai	Malaika Khan	18	1.72 m (5 ft 7 1/2 in)	Northern	Top 10	
MGT14	Chiang Mai	Athita Payak	27	1.75 m (5 ft 9 in)	Northern	Top 10	
MGT15	Trang	Phanumat Prasoetsang	21	1.70 m (5 ft 7 in)	Southern		
MGT16	Trat	Ploypailin Worapong	22	1.68 m (5 ft 6 in)	Central		
MGT17	Tak	Waraporn Krachangduang	24	1.72 m (5 ft 7 1/2 in)	Northern		
MGT18	Nakhon Nayok	Nachita Jantana	23	1.73 m (5 ft 8 in)	Central		
MGT19	Nakhon Pathom	Pimonwan Namhai	24	1.67 m (5 ft 5 1/2 in)	Central		
MGT20	Nakhon Phanom	Panida Kernjinda	26	1.68 m (5 ft 6 in)	Northeastern		
MGT21	Nakhon Ratchasima	Nattha Siriwongsakul	25	1.74 m (5 ft 8 1/2 in)	Northeastern		
MGT22	Nakhon Si Thammarat	Sornwanee Suwanmanee	18	1.70 m (5 ft 7 in)	Southern		
MGT23	Nakhon Sawan	Aizryh Phipat (Note: Nakhon Sawan – Aksarapak Chaiammart, the original winner, was unable to participate at the national stage due to the education issues, hence, the first runner-up Aizryh Phipat was instead promoted to take over the title.)	24	1.73 m (5 ft 8 in)	Northern	Top 20	
MGT24	Nonthaburi	Thiphayaporn Phomraj	24	1.72 m (5 ft 7 1/2 in)	Central	Top 10	
MGT25	Narathiwat	Salitaya Rakrod	21	1.69 m (5 ft 6 1/2 in)	Southern		
MGT26	Nan	Kanyaphatsaphon Rungrueang	24	1.74 m (5 ft 8 1/2 in)	Northern		
MGT27	Bueng Kan	Sumintra Chudchonnabot	26	1.70 m (5 ft 7 in)	Northeastern		
MGT28	Buriram	Kantima Nonthasit	24	1.70 m (5 ft 7 in)	Northeastern		
MGT29	Pathum Thani	Wichida Nuamsorn	21	1.71 m (5 ft 7 1/2 in)	Central		
MGT30	Prachuap Khiri Khan	Kansuda Chanakeeree	24	1.71 m (5 ft 7 1/2 in)	Southern	Top 20	Miss Grand Myanmar 2022
MGT31	Prachinburi	Mueanphan Kunket	24	1.72 m (5 ft 7 1/2 in)	Central		
MGT32	Pattani	Cherisa Thana	23	1.68 m (5 ft 6 in)	Southern		
MGT33	Phra Nakhon Si Ayutthaya	Sunaree Chaimungkun	27	1.73 m (5 ft 8 in)	Central	Top 20	
MGT34	Phayao	Nichakun Senawong	24	1.73 m (5 ft 8 in)	Northern		
MGT35	Phang Nga	Jiraporn Changphetpon	22	1.70 m (5 ft 7 in)	Southern		
MGT36	Phatthalung	Cattleya Delmaire Michelle	26	1.73 m (5 ft 8 in)	Southern		
MGT37	Phichit	Nutthamon Kanthawong	22	1.70 m (5 ft 7 in)	Northern		
MGT38	Phitsanulok	Yanisa Levisuth	22	1.67 m (5 ft 5 1/2 in)	Northern		
MGT39	Phetchaburi	Wasunan Sawekwiharee	22	1.70 m (5 ft 7 in)	Southern		
MGT40	Phetchabun	Suthida Ninpai	26	1.68 m (5 ft 6 in)	Northern		
MGT41	Phrae	Suphatra Kliangprom	23	1.71 m (5 ft 7 1/2 in)	Northern	4th Runner-up	
MGT42	Phuket	Amanda Jensen	23	1.73 m (5 ft 8 in)	Southern	1st Runner-up	
MGT43	Maha Sarakham	Wanlaya Thongchom	21	1.73 m (5 ft 8 in)	Northeastern		
MGT44	Mukdahan	Marichsa Piuengam	24	1.70 m (5 ft 7 in)	Northeastern	Top 20	
MGT45	Mae Hong Son	Nichakorn Tharathipsakun	25	1.75 m (5 ft 9 in)	Northern		
MGT46	Yala	Pakamas Pumkerd	24	1.75 m (5 ft 9 in)	Southern		
MGT47	Yasothon	Pitchaporn Petkaeo	27	1.76 m (5 ft 9 1/2 in)	Northeastern		
MGT48	Roi Et	Jaruwan Mompranao	21	1.70 m (5 ft 7 in)	Northeastern		
MGT49	Ranong	Ratchaneekorn Prasertpornsak	26	1.73 m (5 ft 8 in)	Southern		
MGT50	Rayong	Chayanapas Chompoorat	27	1.74 m (5 ft 8 1/2 in)	Central		
MGT51	Ratchaburi	Umawadee Pimpa	22	1.70 m (5 ft 7 in)	Southern		
MGT52	Lopburi	Niratcha Namwatcharasopit	25	1.75 m (5 ft 9 in)	Central		
MGT53	Lampang	Likhitpak Wijitsuwan	25	1.72 m (5 ft 7 1/2 in)	Northern	Top 20	
MGT54	Lamphun	Kanchana Chaimunmung	24	1.70 m (5 ft 7 in)	Northern		
MGT55	Loei	Chanakan Nasom	24	1.69 m (5 ft 6 1/2 in)	Northeastern		
MGT56	Sisaket	Kittiyaporn Lanont	23	1.72 m (5 ft 7 1/2 in)	Northeastern	Top 20	
MGT57	Sakon Nakhon	Aroonluck Mothaneechiyachoke	27	1.69 m (5 ft 6 1/2 in)	Northeastern		
MGT58	Songkhla	Paweena Niamraksa	22	1.73 m (5 ft 8 in)	Southern		
MGT59	Satun	Aksorn Benchanirat	23	1.70 m (5 ft 7 in)	Southern	Top 20	
MGT60	Samut Prakan	Peerada Yodjai	26	1.79 m (5 ft 10 1/2 in)	Central		
MGT61	Samut Songkhram	Rita Battaglino	18	1.70 m (5 ft 7 in)	Central		
MGT62	Samut Sakhon	Pornchanok Srikaeo	26	1.70 m (5 ft 7 in)	Central		
MGT63	Sa Kaeo	Suttida Chaiyakam	26	1.68 m (5 ft 6 in)	Central		
MGT64	Saraburi	Nareerat Wannawohan	22	1.78 m (5 ft 10 in)	Central		
MGT65	Singburi	Supatsorn Somsuk	25	1.68 m (5 ft 6 in)	Central		
MGT66	Sukhothai	Worada Chatsri	25	1.70 m (5 ft 7 in)	Northern		
MGT67	Suphanburi	Thanatchaporn Pankaew	27	1.70 m (5 ft 7 in)	Central		
MGT68	Surat Thani	Sulax Siriphattharaphong	24	1.78 m (5 ft 10 in)	Southern		
MGT69	Surin	Pa-ornrat Pinmueang	23	1.74 m (5 ft 8 1/2 in)	Northeastern	Top 20	
MGT70	Nong Khai	Panida Hemtadathanakun	25	1.70 m (5 ft 7 in)	Northeastern		
MGT71	Nong Bua Lamphu	Nuanla-ong Donsuea	21	1.70 m (5 ft 7 in)	Northeastern		
MGT72	Ang Thong	Ornpreeya Nesa Mahmoodi	21	1.70 m (5 ft 7 in)	Central	3rd Runner-up	
MGT73	Udon Thani	Sara Helena Sarakan	24	1.70 m (5 ft 7 in)	Northeastern		
MGT74	Uthai Thani	Achicha Mahasawat	25	1.67 m (5 ft 5 1/2 in)	Northern		
MGT75	Uttaradit	Jintana Nimthong	24	1.75 m (5 ft 9 in)	Northern		
MGT76	Ubon Ratchathani	Atiya Meeseephong	21	1.75 m (5 ft 9 in)	Northeastern		
MGT77	Amnat Charoen	Kamonwan Somsa-ard	21	1.71 m (5 ft 7 1/2 in)	Northeastern		
