= Chotnapa Kaewjarun =

Thai beauty pageant titleholder

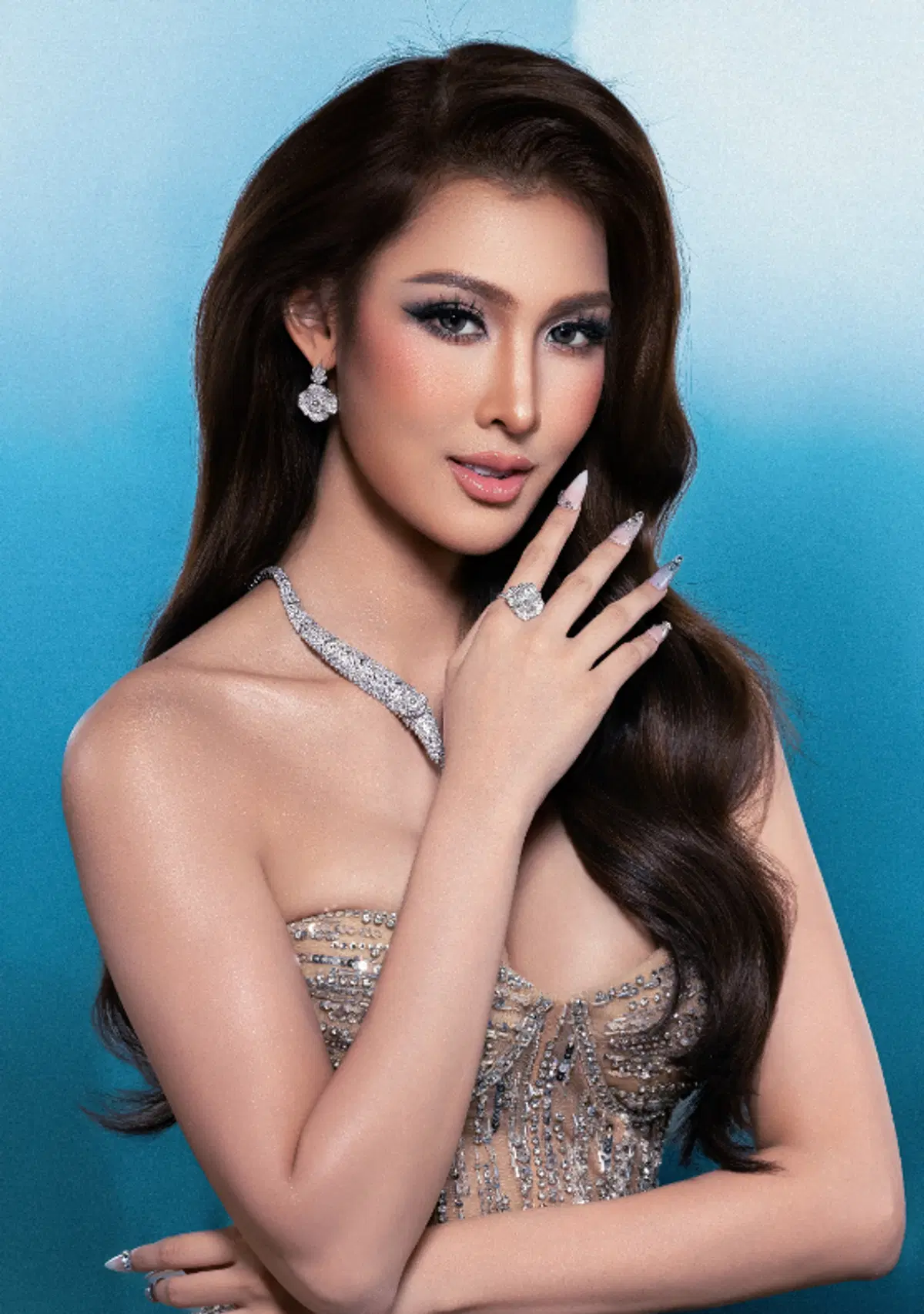
- Beauty pageant titleholder
- Title: Miss Thailand 2025; Miss Cosmo Thailand 2025
- Major competitions: Miss Thailand World 2023; (Top 5); Miss Thailand 2025; (Winner); Miss Cosmo 2025; (Top 10)

Chotnapa Kaewjarun (Thai: โชตินภา แก้วจรูญ) is a Thai beauty pageant titleholder. She won Miss Thailand 2025 and represented Thailand at Miss Cosmo 2025 in Vietnam, where she placed in the Top 10.

== Pageantry ==
=== Miss Thailand World 2023 ===
Kaewjarun entered Miss Thailand World 2023 and reached the top five.

=== Miss Thailand 2025 ===
Kaewjarun represented Phra Nakhon Si Ayutthaya and won Miss Thailand 2025, on 25 May 2025 in Chon Buri province.

=== Miss Cosmo 2025 ===
Kaewjarun represented Thailand at Miss Cosmo 2025, where she finished in the Top 10.

Awards and achievements
Preceded by Karnruethai Tassabut	Miss Cosmo Thailand; 2025	Succeeded by Malaika Khan
Preceded by Panida Kernjinda	Miss Thailand; 2025	Succeeded by Jiraporn Saladaeng
