= Dayana Cardenas =

Colombian model and beauty pageant titleholder

- Born: 1997 or 1998 (age 27–28); Colombia
- Education: UNAD
- Beauty pageant titleholder
- Title: Miss Cosmo Colombia 2025
- Major competitions: Miss Universe Colombia 2020; (Top 6); Top Model of the World 2022; (2nd Runner Up); Miss Cosmo 2025; (Top 10)

Dayana Cárdenas Mestre is a Colombian model and beauty pageant titleholder who was selected as Miss Cosmo Colombia 2025. She represented Colombia at Miss Cosmo 2025, where she placed in the Top 10. She also represented Colombia at Top Model of the World 2022 and was second runner-up.

== Early life ==
Dayana Cárdenas was born in Colombia in 1997 or 1998 (age 27–28). She studied business administration at UNAD in Medellín, Antioquia. In addition to her native language, she is fluent in English.

== Pageantry ==
=== Miss Universe Colombia 2020 ===
Cárdenas represented Amazonas at Miss Universe Colombia 2020, and reached the top six.

=== Top Model of the World 2022 ===
Dayana represented her country in Top Model of the World 2022 and was second Runner-up.

=== Miss Cosmo 2025 ===
Cárdenas was appointed Miss Cosmo Colombia 2025 by the national organization and represented Colombia at Miss Cosmo 2025 in Vietnam. At the conclusion of the event, she placed in the Top 10.

Awards and achievements
Preceded by María Alejandra Salazar	Miss Cosmo Colombia; 2025	Succeeded by Juliana Franco
Preceded by Giselle Archbold Davis	Top Model of the World 2nd Runner-Up; 2022	Succeeded by Sandani Peiris
