= Chelsea Fernandez =

Filipino beauty pageant titleholder

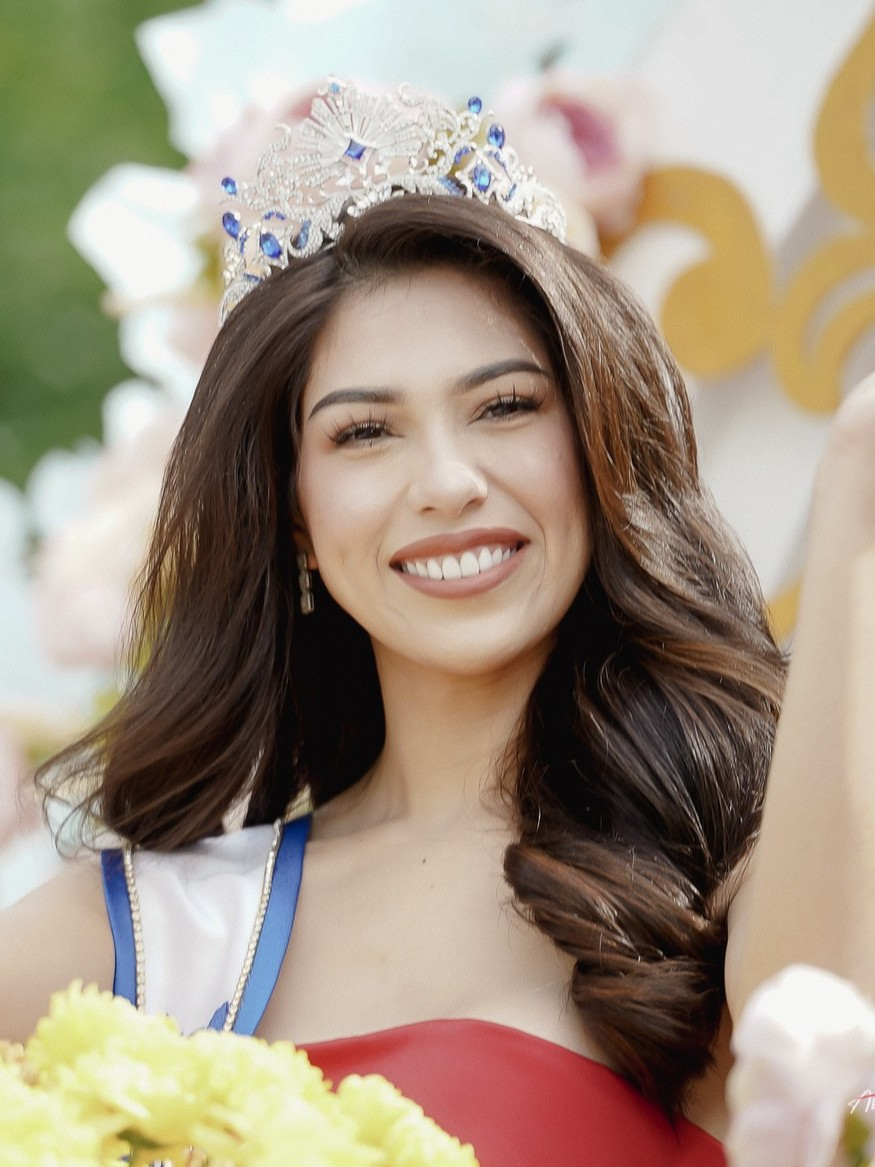
- Fernandez in 2025
- Born: Chelsea Lovely Cabias Fernandez; Tacurong, Sultan Kudarat, Philippines
- Beauty pageant titleholder
- Title: Miss Earth Philippines Water 2019; Binibining Pilipinas Globe 2022; The Miss Philippines Cosmo 2025
- Major competitions: Miss Philippines Earth 2019; (Miss Philippines Water); Binibining Pilipinas 2022; (Winner – Binibining Pilipinas Globe 2022); The Miss Globe 2022; (Top 15); Miss Universe Philippines 2025; (Top 6); Miss Cosmo 2025; (Runner-Up)

Chelsea Lovely Cabias Fernandez is a Filipino beauty pageant titleholder who won the title of Miss Philippines Water 2019. She represented the Philippines at The Miss Globe 2022 and reached the Top 15. She reached the finals of Miss Universe Philippines 2025 and represented the Philippines at Miss Cosmo 2025 in Vietnam, and was the runner-up.

== Early life and education ==
Chelsea Lovely Fernandez was born in Tacurong, Sultan Kudarat, Philippines. Shortly after birth, she was adopted and raised in Tacloban, Leyte. Fernandez studied mass communication, majoring in broadcasting.

== Pageantry ==
=== Miss Philippines Earth 2019 ===
Fernandez represented Tacloban in Miss Philippines Earth 2019 and won the title of Miss Philippines Water 2019, one of the elemental titles in the pageant.

=== Binibining Pilipinas 2022 ===
In 2022, she competed in Binibining Pilipinas as the representative of Tacloban. She won Binibining Pilipinas Globe 2022 and also received the special award of Miss Ever Bilena.

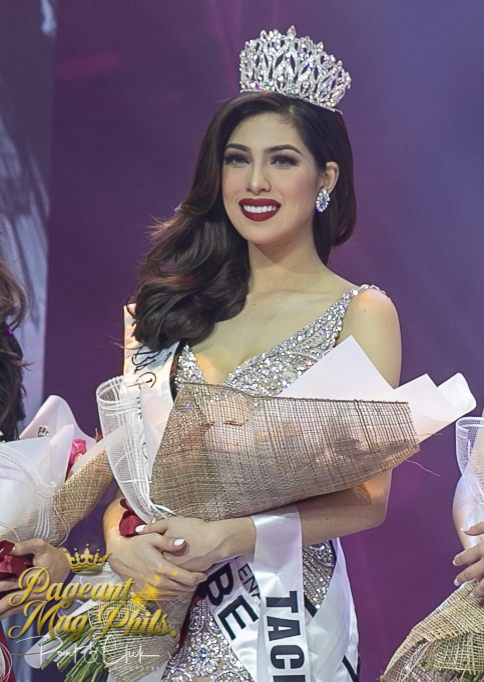
Fernandez is crowned Binibining Pilipinas Globe 2022

=== The Miss Globe 2022 ===
Fernandez represented the Philippines at The Miss Globe 2022 held in Albania, where she finished in the Top 15. She also won the Miss Head to Head Challenge.

=== Miss Universe Philippines 2025 ===
In 2025, Fernandez represented Sultan Kudarat at Miss Universe Philippines 2025. Although she previously associated with Tacloban, she chose to represent the province of her birthplace, Tacurong.

=== Miss Cosmo 2025 ===
Fernandez represented the Philippines at the second edition of the Miss Cosmo pageant, held in Vietnam. She was appointed Miss Cosmo Philippines 2025, marking her return to international pageantry following her earlier participation in The Miss Globe 2022.

During the preliminary competitions, Fernandez placed among the Top 17 in the national (carnival) costume segment, wearing a Sarimanok-inspired costume designed by ER Stephen Alvarado, drawing from Maranao folklore and Filipino Muslim heritage. She also finished in the Top 5 of the Best of Vietnam – Áo dài Fashion Show, one of the pageant's cultural special segments.

At the pageant's jury session and preliminary competition, held in Ho Chi Minh City, Fernandez received two special recognitions: Eventista's Iconic Swimsuit Award and the Parade of Beauty Award. Reports noted that the swimsuit award was based on an online poll associated with the pageant's activities. Her community initiative was also selected among the Top 26 projects recognized at the Cosmo Green Summit, a pageant-affiliated program highlighting social and environmental advocacy.

During the competition, Fernandez was reported to have become the first delegate to surpass one million votes in the Miss Cosmo People's Choice online poll, with subsequent reports indicating that her vote total later increased to more than 28 million by the end of the voting period.

At the coronation night held on December 20, 2025, at the Creative Park in Ho Chi Minh City, Fernandez finished as first runner-up, placing second overall behind Yolina Lindquist of the United States.She also received the Best in Evening Gown award and won the People’s Choice Award, which secured her placement in the Top 10 during the competition.

=== Other Pageants ===
Fernandez also won Reyna ng Aliwan 2018, and Miss Gandang Contesera Quest 2020.

Awards and achievements
Preceded by Karnruethai Tassabut	Runner-up Miss Cosmo; 2025	Incumbent
Preceded by Ahtisa Manalo (Quezon)	Miss Cosmo Philippines; 2025	Succeeded by Bella Ysmael (Taguig)
Preceded by Maureen Montagne (Batangas)	Binibining Pilipinas Globe; 2022	Succeeded by Anna Lakrini (Bataan)
Preceded by Berjayneth Chee (Balingasag, Misamis Oriental)	Miss Philippines - Water; 2019	Succeeded by Gianna Llanes (Mandaluyong)
