= Yolina Lindquist =

American beauty pageant titleholder

- Lindquist in 2026
- Born: Yolina Serafina Lindquist; 2003 (age 22–23); Metropolis, Illinois, U.S.
- Education: Southern Illinois University
- Height: 1.74 m (5 ft 9 in)
- Beauty pageant titleholder
- Title: Miss Cosmo USA 2025; Miss Cosmo 2025
- Major competitions: Miss Illinois USA 2023; (3rd Runner-Up); Miss Illinois USA 2025; (1st Runner-Up); Miss Cosmo USA 2025; (Winner); Miss Cosmo 2025; (Winner)

Yolina Serafina Lindquist (born 2003) is an American beauty pageant titleholder who won Miss Cosmo 2025. Lindquist represented the United States at Miss Cosmo 2025, and was the first American to win Miss Cosmo.

== Early life and education ==
Yolina Serafina Lindquist was born in 2003, and is from Metropolis, Illinois and was born to Leila Lindquist-Schubiger and Lars Lindquist. Lindquist graduated from Massac County High School in 2021. She graduated summa cum laude at Southern Illinois University, with degrees in Marketing, International & Financial Economics, German, and International Trade.

== Pageantry ==
Lindquist won Little Miss Supergirl in 2011 and Tiny Miss Supergirl prior to that. She won last Miss Metropolis Pre-Teen and in 2021 was crowned Miss Metropolis Outstanding Teen. At Miss Southern Illinois USA, Lindquist was third runner-up at Miss Illinois USA 2023, at the Braden Auditorium of Illinois State University, against 37 other candidates. Lindquist represented Southern Illinois and was first runner-up at Miss Illinois USA 2025, on May 25, 2025, at the Braden Auditorium of Illinois State University. Lindquist was appointed Miss Cosmo Illinois 2025 and won Miss Cosmo USA 2025, on October 19, 2025. Lindquist represented the United States and won Miss Cosmo 2025, held at Vietnam's Creative Park on December 20, 2025. She was crowned by Miss Cosmo 2024 Ketut Permata Juliastrid. She is expected to reign with the runner-up, Chelsea Fernandez from the Philippines.

== Advocacy ==
Lindquist's advocacy platform, Courage Over Cancer focuses on research initiatives, fundraising efforts, and outreach to patients, while her other platform, Servant Leadership, focuses on empathy-driven leadership through service to others.

Awards and achievements
Preceded by Ketut Permata Juliastrid, Indonesia	Miss Cosmo; 2025	Succeeded by Incumbent
Preceded by Samantha Jo Elliott (Illinois)	Miss Cosmo USA; 2025	Succeeded by Zoe McGrady (New York)
