= Jada Kyle =

Australian beauty pageant titleholder

- Born: Australia
- Beauty pageant titleholder
- Title: Miss Cosmo Australia 2025
- Major competitions: Miss Grand Australia 2025; (1st Runner-Up); Miss Cosmo Australia 2025; (Winner); Miss Cosmo 2025; (Unplaced)

Jada Kyle is an Australian beauty pageant titleholder who won Miss Cosmo Australia 2025. She represented Australia at Miss Cosmo 2025 in Vietnam.

Kyle also participated in the eighth season of Australian Idol.

== Pageantry ==
=== Miss Grand Australia 2025 ===
Jada Kyle first participated in Miss Grand Australia 2025 and was the first runner-up.

=== Miss Cosmo Australia 2025 ===
She attended and won the inaugural Miss Cosmo Australia 2025.

=== Miss Cosmo 2025 ===
She represented Australia at Miss Cosmo 2025 in December in Vietnam.

Awards and achievements
Preceded by Lydia Caisley Harland	Miss Cosmo Australia; 2025	Succeeded by Incumbent
