= Ziwei Dimitra Varaki =

Greek beauty pageant titleholder

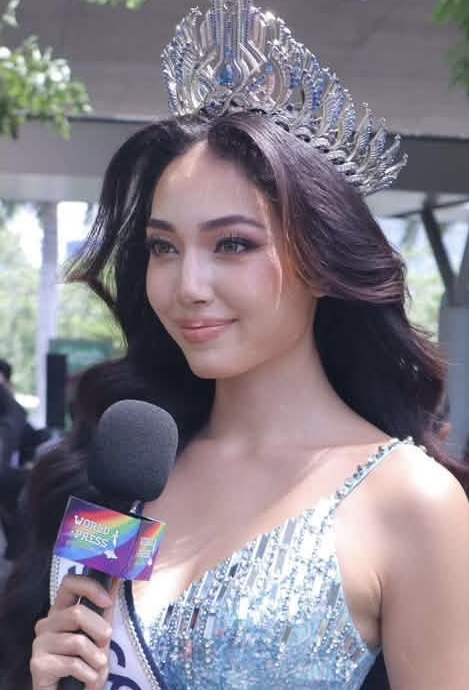
- Varaki in 2026
- Born: Ziwei Dimitra Varaki; Thessaloniki, Greece
- Beauty pageant titleholder
- Title: Miss Cosmo Greece 2026
- Major competitions: Miss Cosmo Greece 2026 (Winner); Miss Cosmo 2026; (TBD)

Ziwei Dimitra Varaki (Greek: Ζιγουέι Δήμητρα Βαράκη) is a Greek beauty pageant titleholder, who won Miss Cosmo Greece 2026. She will represent Greece at Miss Cosmo 2026 competition.

== Pageantry ==
Varaki competed in Star Hellas 2026 and won the Miss Cosmo Greece 2026 title. Varaki will represent Greece at Miss Cosmo 2026.

Awards and achievements
Preceded by Irene Abudinen (Bolivia)	4th Runner-Up Miss International Fashion; 2025	Succeeded by Saki Yumakoto (Japan)
Preceded by Yuewei Chen (China)	Miss Cantongyi International Supermodel; 2025	Succeeded by Luyi Tian (Macau)
Preceded by Ioanna Sarantopoulou	Miss Cosmo Greece; 2026	Succeeded by Incumbent
