= Konstantina Sotiriou =

Greek model, primary school teacher and beauty titleholder (born 1999)

- Born: Greece
- Beauty pageant titleholder
- Title: Miss Cosmo Greece 2024
- Major competitions: Miss Cosmo Greece 2024 (Winner); Miss Cosmo 2024 (Top 21)

Konstantina Sotiriou (Greek: Κωνσταντίνα Σωτηρίου) is a Greek beauty pageant titleholder, who won Miss Cosmo Greece 2024. She is the first representative of Greece to attend Miss Cosmo 2024 and reached the top 21.

== Pageantry ==
=== Miss Cosmo Greece 2024 ===
Konstantina Sotiriou first participated in the national beauty pageant Star Hellas 2022 and was runner-up. She was appointed as Miss Cosmo Greece to participate in Miss Cosmo 2024.

=== Miss Cosmo 2024 ===
At Miss Cosmo 2024 she reached the top 21.

Awards and achievements
Preceded by First	Miss Cosmo Greece; 2024	Succeeded by Ioanna Sarantopoulou
