= Malaika Khan (model) =

Thai beauty pageant titleholder

- มาลัยกะ คาร
- Born: Malaika Khan; Karachi, Pakistan
- Beauty pageant titleholder
- Title: Miss Grand Chiang Rai 2022; Miss Cosmo Thailand 2026
- Major competitions: Miss Grand Thailand 2022; (5th Runner-Up); Miss World Thailand 2026; (1st Runner-Up); Miss Cosmo 2026; (TBD)

Malaika Khan (Thai: มาลัยกะ คาร, pronounced [maːlajka kʰaːn]), also known by her nickname Malai (Thai: มาลัย, lit. 'Garland'), is a Thai–Pakistani beauty pageant titleholder who was crowned Miss Cosmo Thailand 2026. She will represent Thailand at Miss Cosmo 2026.

== Early life ==
Malaika Khan was born and raised in Karachi, Pakistan. She moved to Rim Khong, Chiang Khong district, Chiang Rai province in Thailand, when she was ten years old. Her father is Pakistani, while her mother is Thai and of Tai Lue and Chinese descent.

== Pageantry ==
=== Miss Grand Thailand ===
Khan won Miss Grand Chiang Rai 2022, and represented Chiang Rai at Miss Grand Thailand 2022, where she was named the fifth runner-up.

=== Miss World Thailand ===
Khan represented Nakhon Sawan at Miss World Thailand 2026 on 10 May 2026, at MCC Hall The Mall Lifestore Ngamwongwan, where she reached the first runner-up.

=== Miss Cosmo ===
Khan appointed Miss Cosmo Thailand 2026, and will represent Thailand at Miss Cosmo 2026 in Vietnam.

Awards and achievements
Preceded by Chotnapa Kaewjarun	Miss Cosmo Thailand; 2026	Succeeded by Incumbent
