= Miss Cosmo 2025 =

Global beauty pageant in Vietnam

- Date: 20 December 2025
- Presenters: Bonang Matheba; Bùi Đức Bảo; Đặng Dương Thanh Thanh Huyền; Karnruethai Tassabut
- Entertainment: Beyonce Forbes; Bùi Thị Xuân Hạnh; Hồ Ngọc Hà; Hương Giang; Hoàng Thùy Linh; Jessi; Ketut Permata Juliastrid; Phương Mỹ Chi; Tempest; Trúc Nhân; Văn Mai Hương; WOKEUP
- Venue: Creative Park, Ho Chi Minh City, Vietnam
- Broadcaster: AXN; YouTube; Facebook Live; SKTV Life
- Entrants: 71
- Placements: 21
- Debuts: Bahamas; Belarus; Cameroon; China; Colombia; Costa Rica; Cuba; Democratic Republic of the Congo; Denmark; Ecuador; Finland; Germany; Guadeloupe; Haiti; Iceland; Lesotho; Liberia; Macau; Malta; Myanmar; Namibia; Panama; Paraguay; Sri Lanka; Taiwan; Turkey; United Arab Emirates; United States Virgin Islands
- Withdrawals: Armenia; Chile; Côte d'Ivoire; Crimea; Egypt; Ghana; Guinea; Honduras; Ireland; Kyrgyzstan; Poland; Portugal; Ukraine
- Winner: Yolina Lindquist; United States
- Best National Costume: Tofunmi Adekola (Nigeria)

Miss Cosmo 2025 was the second edition of the Miss Cosmo pageant held at the Creative Park in Ho Chi Minh City, Vietnam, on 20 December 2025. Ketut Permata Juliastrid of Indonesia crowned Yolina Lindquist of the United States as her successor at the end of the event.

== Background ==
=== Location and date ===
On 22 August 2025, The Miss Cosmo Organization announced Vietnam as the host country for the contest. The pageant will be held at the Creative Park in Ho Chi Minh City, Vietnam, from 28 November to 20 December 2025.

== Pageant ==
=== Selection committee ===
- Ali Aslan — Moderator, TV presenter, and broadcast journalist
- George Chien — Co-founder, CEO and president of the KC Global Media
- Harnaaz Sandhu — Miss Universe 2021 from India
- Nguyễn Hoàng Vũ — Entrepreneur and business leader
- Olivia Yacé — Miss World 2021 second runner-up and Miss Universe 2025 fourth runner-up from Côte d'Ivoire
- Paula Shugart — Former President of the Miss Universe Organization
- Phạm Sanh Châu — Businessman, political figure, educator, and global diplomatic advocate

=== Broadcast ===
On 22 August 2025, it was announced that AXN will broadcast the grand finale on their channel. South African television presenter, Bonang Matheba, Vietnamese presenter, and Bùi Đức Bảo served as the presenter. Vietnamese V-pop singers Hoàng Thùy Linh, Phương Mỹ Chi, Hồ Ngọc Hà, Văn Mai Hương, Trúc Nhân, and Hương Giang, in addition to American rapper, Jessi, South Korean boy band, Tempest, Vietnamese DJ, WOKEUP, Miss Cosmo 2024, Ketut Permata Juliastrid, and Miss Cosmo Vietnam 2023, Bùi Thị Xuân Hạnh, performed in the event.

== Results ==
=== Placements ===
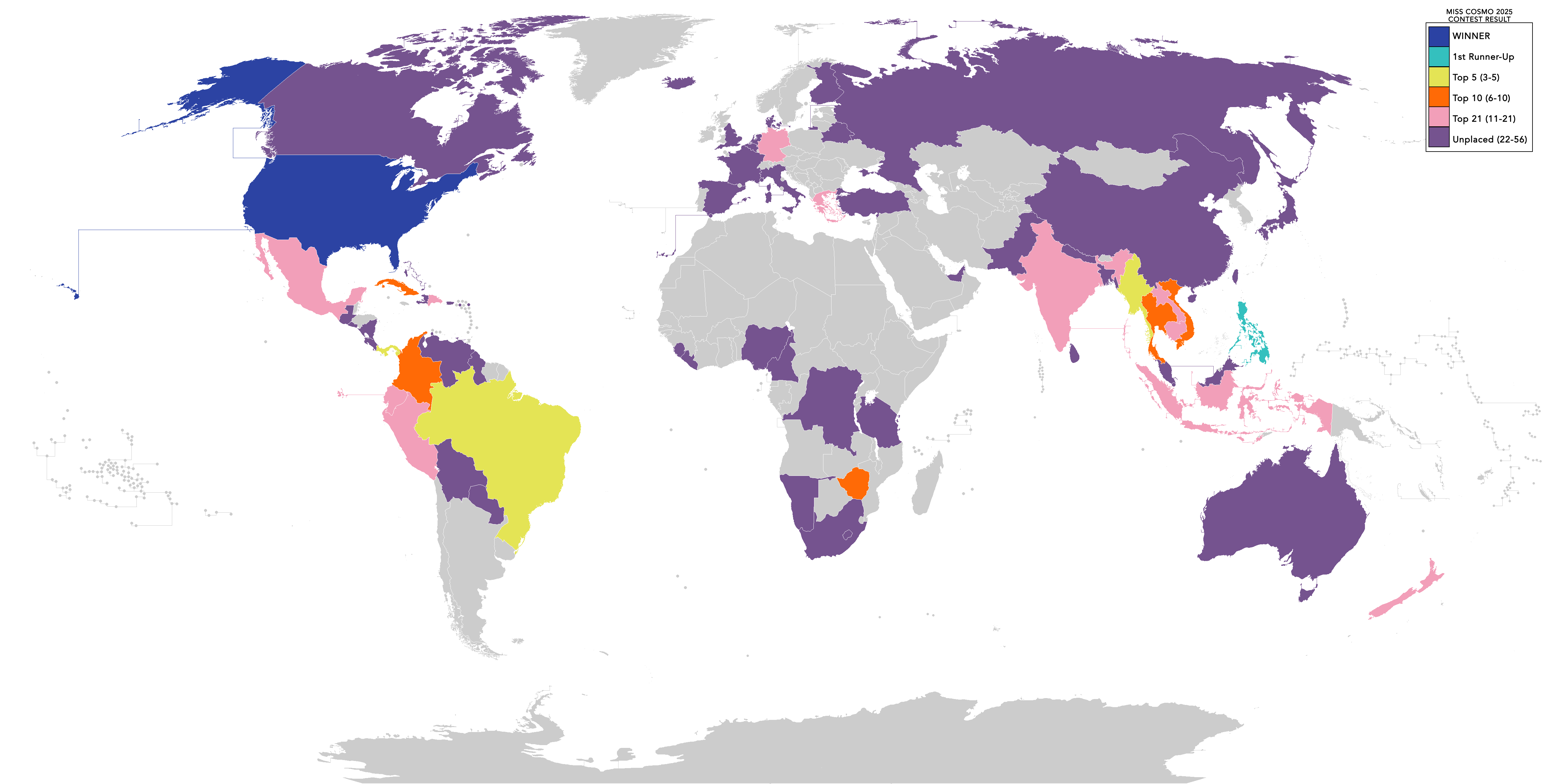
Participating countries/territories and results for Miss Cosmo 2025.

Placement	Contestant
Miss Cosmo 2025	United States – Yolina Lindquist
Runner-Up	Philippines – Chelsea Fernandez^{[§]}
Top 5	Brazil – Gabriela Borges; Myanmar – Myint Myat Moe^{[∆]}; Panama – Italy Mora
Top 10	Colombia – Dayana Cárdenas; Cuba – Amys Nápoles Ochoa; Thailand – Chotnapa Kaewjarun; Vietnam – Hoàng Phương Linh Nguyễn; Zimbabwe – Lisa Sibanda
Top 21	Cambodia – Sreypii Phorn; Dominican Republic – Delisa Francisco; Ecuador – Alexandra Mina; Germany – Chloé Ëlyse; Greece – Ioanna Sarantopoulou; India – Vipra Mehta; Indonesia – Salma Ranggita; Laos – Christina Lasasimma; Mexico – Angela Yuriar; New Zealand – Katharina Weischede; Peru – Kelín Rivera

Notes:
^§ – placed into the Top 10 by the Cosmo People's Choice Award (fan voting challenge)
Note:
^∆ – placed into the Top 21 by the Cosmo Social Ambassador Award (fan voting challenge)

=== Special awards ===
Award	Contestant
Best Catwalk	Cuba – Amys Nápoles Ochoa
Best Carnival Costume	Nigeria – Tofunmi Adekola
Best In Ao Dai	Peru – Kelín Rivera
Best In Evening Gown	Philippines – Chelsea Fernandez
Best In Swimsuit	Brazil – Gabriela Borges
Cosmo Beauty Icon Award	Panama – Italy Mora
Cosmo Impactful Beauty Award	Namibia – Cassia Sharpley
Cosmo People's Choice Award	Philippines – Chelsea Fernandez
Cosmo Social Ambassador	Myanmar – Myint Myat Moe
Cosmo's Tourism Ambassador	Laos – Christina Lasasimma
Women Leadership Award	Greece – Ioanna Sarantopoulou

== Challenge events ==
=== Best Catwalk ===
Placement	Contestant
Winner	Cuba – Amys Nápoles Ochoa
Top 5	Brazil – Gabriela Borges; Colombia – Dayana Cárdenas; Sierra Leone – Marcella Momoh; Thailand – Chotnapa Kaewjarun

=== Best in Ao Dai ===
Placement	Contestant
Winner	Peru – Kelín Rivera
Top 5	Bahamas – Beyonce Forbes; Ecuador – Alexandra Mina; Philippines – Chelsea Fernandez; Vietnam – Hoàng Phương Linh Nguyễn

=== Best in Swimsuit ===
Placement	Contestant
Winner	Brazil – Gabriela Borges
Top 5	India – Vipra Mehta; Mexico – Angela Yuriar; Myanmar – Myint Myat Moe; Panama – Italy Mora

=== The T.E.A Cosmo Carnival Show ===
Placement	Contestant
Winner	Nigeria – Tofunmi Adekola
Top 17	Bahamas – Beyonce Forbes; Bolivia – Fernanda Antelo; Cameroon – Josiane Golonga; El Salvador – Rakele Menjívar; England – Phoebe Michaelides; Guyana – Kayla King; India – Vipra Mehta; Indonesia – Salma Ranggita; Mexico – Angela Yuriar; Nepal – Deepshikha Nepal; Panama – Italy Mora; Peru – Kelín Rivera; Philippines – Chelsea Fernandez; Spain – Dori Rodríguez; Sri Lanka – Kalani Athukorala; United States – Yolina Lindquist

=== Cosmo Impactful Beauty Award ===
Placement	Contestant
Winner	Namibia – Cassia Sharpley
Runner-up	South Africa – Pale Legoabe
Top 10	Cuba – Amys Nápoles Ochoa; Dominican Republic – Delisa Francisco; Indonesia – Salma Ranggita; Nepal – Deepshikha Nepal; New Zealand – Katharina Weischede; Singapore – Nabila Houti; United States – Yolina Lindquist; Vietnam – Hoàng Phương Linh Nguyễn
Top 26	Colombia – Dayana Cárdenas; El Salvador – Rakele Menjívar; Gibraltar – Gabriella Olivero; Greece – Ioanna Sarantopoulou; India – Vipra Mehta; Lesotho – Refiloe Makoae; Liberia – Kindness Wilson; Malta – Henrika Galea; Netherlands – Solange Dekker; Nicaragua – Marian Rodríguez; Peru – Kelín Rivera; Philippines – Chelsea Fernandez; Sri Lanka – Kalani Athukorala; South Korea – Haesu Woo (Note: Later withdrew); Taiwan – Sienna Xiong; Thailand – Chotnapa Kaewjarun

=== Cosmo Social Ambassador ===
- Advanced to the Top 21 via Cosmo Social Ambassador.

Placement	Contestant
Winner	Myanmar – Myint Myat Moe
Top 3	India – Vipra Mehta; Paraguay - Angely Beníte

== Contestants ==
71 Contestants competed for the title.

Country/Territory	Contestant	Age (Note: Ages at the time of the pageant)	Hometown
Australia	Jada Kyle	26	Melbourne
Bahamas	Beyonce Forbes	22	Grand Bahama
Bangladesh	Alisha Islam	24	Dinajpur
Belarus	Polli Cannabis	28	Minsk
Belgium	Anouck Briké	20	Tienen
Bolivia	Fernanda Antelo	27	La Paz
Brazil	Gabriela Borges	27	Paraná
Cambodia	Sreypii Phorn	23	Banteay Meanchey
Cameroon	Josiane Golonga	23	Yagoua
Canada	Samantha Slewa	28	Ontario
China	Yuexin Xiong	25	Zhejiang
Colombia	Dayana Cárdenas	27	Valledupar
Costa Rica	Sharon Recinos	28	Heredia
Cuba	Amys Nápoles Ochoa	20	Las Tunas
Democratic Republic of the Congo	Dorcas Nende	33	Beni
Denmark	Clara Rønneholt	23	Aarhus
Dominican Republic	Delisa Francisco	30	Nagua
Ecuador	Alexandra Mina	19	Santo Domingo
El Salvador	Rakele Menjívar	24	Santa Ana
England	Phoebe Michaelides	27	London
Finland	Iiris Yli-Kaatiala	28	Helsinki
France	Nolwenn le Port	27	Auray
Germany	Chloé Ëlyse	32	Southern Germany
Gibraltar	Gabriella Olivero	20	Gibraltar
Greece	Ioanna Sarantopoulou	25	Athens
Guadeloupe	Marian Madly	28	Petit-Bourg
Guatemala	Dayana Lemus	25	Izabal
Guyana	Kayla King	22	Parika
Haiti	Sklouchere Pierre	25	Lauderhill
Hong Kong	Xiao Min Lin	26	Hong Kong
Iceland	Kristín Jónasdóttir	24	Reykjavík
India	Vipra Mehta	22	Udaipur
Indonesia	Salma Ranggita	22	Palembang
Italy	Marika Nardozi	25	Lazio
Japan	Maria Ishida	30	Kōchi
Laos	Christina Lasasimma	32	Vientiane
Lesotho	Refiloe Makoae	25	Thaba Bosiu
Liberia	Kindness Wilson	27	Monrovia
Macau	Lou Ie Tiem	30	Hengqin
Malaysia	Rieyka Lee	29	Kuala Lumpur
Malta	Henrika Galea	22	Balzan
Mexico	Ángela Yuriar	25	Culiacán
Myanmar	Myint Myat Moe	19	Yangon
Namibia	Cassia Sharpley	25	Windhoek
Nepal	Deepshikha Nepal	24	Jhapa
Netherlands	Solange Dekker	29	Amsterdam
New Zealand	Katharina Weischede	19	Auckland
Nicaragua	Marian Rodríguez	20	Potosí
Nigeria	Tofunmi Adekola	22	Lagos
Pakistan	Mia Sadique	20	Jhelum
Panama	Italy Mora	20	Panama City
Paraguay	Angely Benítez	21	Luque
Peru	Kelín Rivera	32	Arequipa
Philippines	Chelsea Fernandez	26	Tacurong
Puerto Rico	Ana Paola Figueroa	31	Carolina
Russia	Daria Orlova	21	Vladivostok
Sierra Leone	Marcella Momoh	22	Pujehun
Singapore	Nabila Houti	22	Singapore
South Africa	Pale Legoabe	20	Pretoria
Spain	Dori Rodríguez	26	Navarre
Sri Lanka	Kalani Athukorala	28	Colombo
Taiwan	Sienna Xiong	27	Taipei
Tanzania	Jesca Micca	23	Tabora
Thailand	Chotnapa Kaewjarun	26	Nakhon Sawan
Turkey	Hüray Ertürk	26	Ankara
United Arab Emirates	Sarah Mariotto	26	Dubai
United States	Yolina Lindquist	22	Metropolis
United States Virgin Islands	Francely Lopez	29	Albuquerque
Venezuela	Tina Batson	26	Barcelona
Vietnam	Hoàng Phương Linh Nguyễn	26	Ho Chi Minh City
Zimbabwe	Lisa Sibanda	33	Chitungwiza
