= Miss Universe Colombia 2020 =

1st Miss Universe Colombia pageant

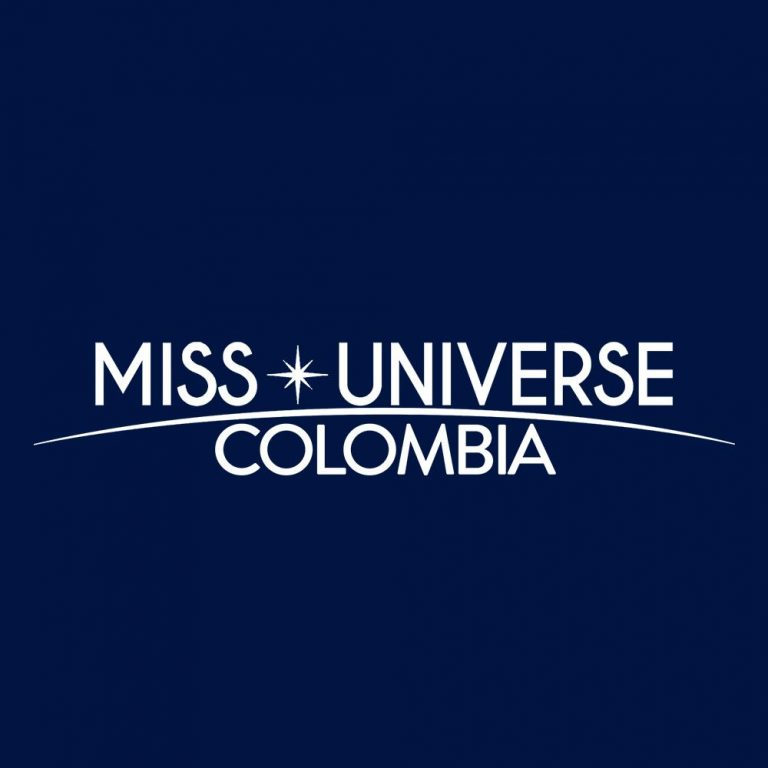
- Date: 16 November 2020
- Presenters: Sebastián Carvajal; Valerie Domínguez; Susy Mora; Diego Pascuas
- Entertainment: Maía; Felipe Peláez; Mr. Black; Bemba Colorá; Gaiteros de Pueblo Santo
- Venue: Pabellón de Cristal, Barranquilla, Colombia
- Broadcaster: RCN Televisión
- Entrants: 30
- Placements: 16
- Winner: Laura Olascuaga; Bolívar

Miss Universe Colombia 2020 was the first Miss Universe Colombia pageant, held at the Pabellón de Cristal in Barranquilla, Colombia, on November 16, 2020.

At the end of the event, Natalie Ackermann director of the Miss Universe Colombia organization crowned Laura Olascuaga of Bolívar as Miss Universe Colombia 2020. She represented Colombia at Miss Universe 2020 in Hollywood, Florida, United States and placed Top 21.

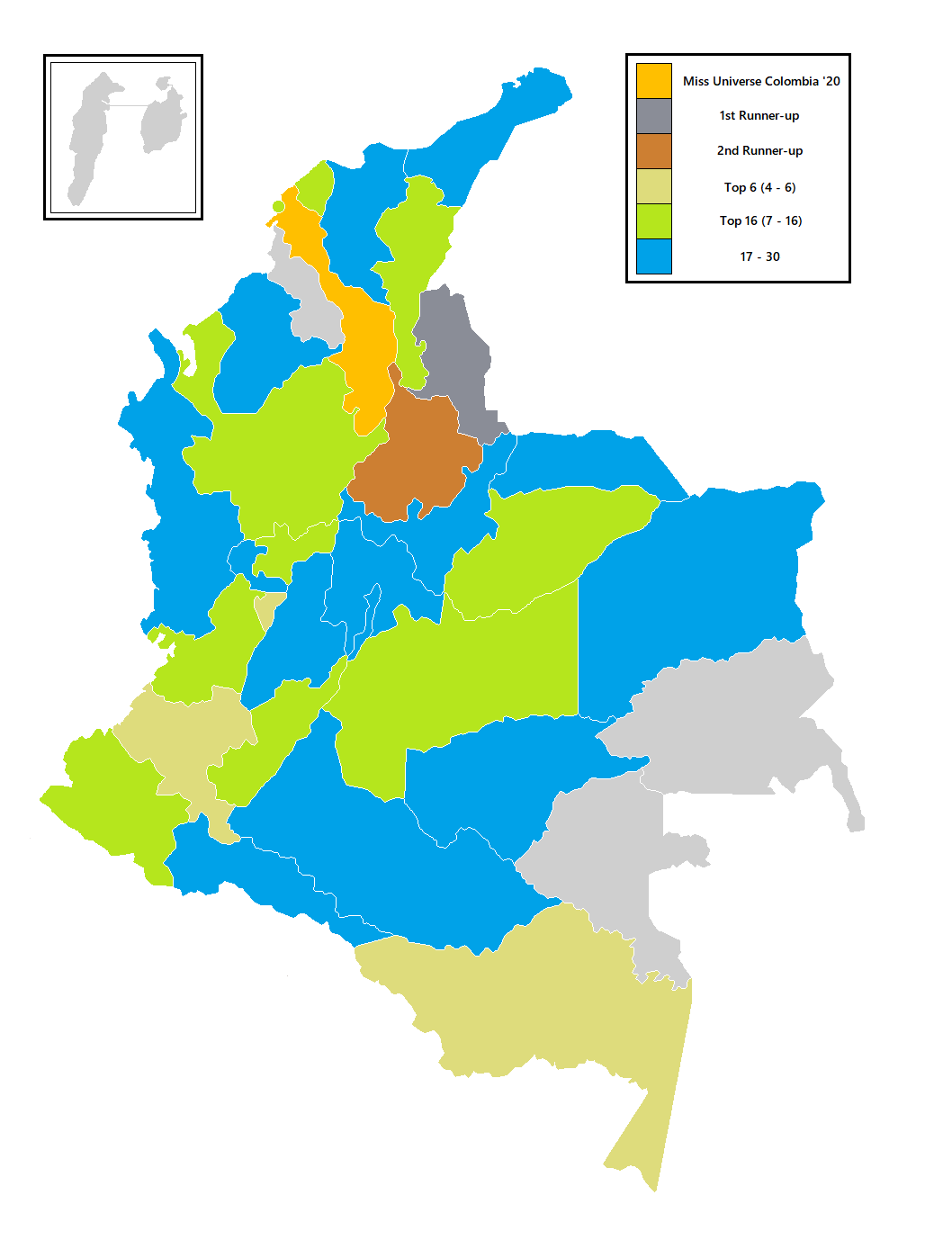
Official results

== Results ==
=== Placements ===
Placement	Contestant
Miss Universe Colombia 2020	Bolívar – Laura Victoria Olascuaga Pinto
1st Runner-Up	Norte de Santander – Jenifer Pulgarín Candelo
2nd Runner-Up	Santander – Laura Juliana Lamus Vargas
Top 6	Cabildo Encanto Amazonas – Dayana Cárdenas Mestra; Cauca – Bárbara Rodríguez Nazarith; Quindío – Yeraldin Grajales Arias §
Top 16	Antioquia – Carolina Londoño Mejia; Atlántico – María Alejandra Castillo Schoonewolff; Caldas – Juliana Aristizábal Bríñez; Cartagena – Marelis Salas Julio; Casanare – Gina Paola Cazarán Bohórquez; Cesar – Mary Trini Araque Díaz; Huila – María José Vargas Fierro; Meta – María Juliana Franco Ramos; Nariño – Dahiara García; Valle del Cauca – Angie Patricia Cuero Reina

§ Voted into Top 16 by viewers.

== Pageant ==
=== Background ===
Initially, Miss Colombia held the Colombian license for Miss Universe, and had selected María Fernanda Aristizábal as the Colombian representative for Miss Universe 2020 through Miss Colombia 2019. However, in June 2020, the license was purchased by Natalie Ackermann, who announced that she would be forming her own organization to select a new Colombian representative for Miss Universe 2020, which meant that Aristizábal would not be competing.

=== Selection of contestants ===
From September to October 2020, castings were held in Bogotá, Bucaramanga, Neiva, Cali, Medellín, and Barranquilla for prospective contestants to audition for a spot in the competition. The official contestants who were selected to compete were released in batches throughout October 2020, following each casting. In order to represent a department, contestants had to either be from the department or have a parent from the department.

Josseidy Escalona was originally to represent Providencia and Santa Catalina Islands, while Valeria Ayos was to represent San Andrés. Escalona resigned from the competition amidst controversy regarding one department receiving two representatives; Ayos was to represent the full department of San Andrés, Providencia and Santa Catalina, but later tested positive for COVID-19 and had to resign from the competition. Luisa Fernanda Urango, the original representative for Córdoba Department, was disqualified after lying about her age; she was replaced by Carolina Guerra. Due to controversy within Amazonas Department over a woman not from the department being their representative, Dayana Cárdenas, the former representative of Amazonas, was changed to represent the city of Valledupar instead. Cárdenas later had her sash changed "Cabildo Encanto Amazonas", referring to the indigenous cabildo of El Encanto in Amazonas Department, which had expressed support for Cárdenas amidst the controversy.

=== Judges ===
- Natalia Barulích – American model and singer
- Catriona Gray – Miss Universe 2018 from the Philippines
- Pilar Guzmán Lizarazo – Public relations officer
- Luz Elena Restrepo – Miss Colombia 1967 from Atlántico
- Amalin de Hasbún – Fashion designer

== Contestants ==
30 delegates have been selected:

Department	Delegate	Age (Note: Ages at the time of the pageant)	Hometown	Placement
Antioquia	Carolina Londoño Mejia	27	Bello	Top 16
Arauca	Génesis Andrea Quintero Pérez	28	Arauca	
Atlántico	María Alejandra Castillo Schoonewolff	24	Barranquilla	Top 16
Bogotá	María del Mar Meza Sánchez	28	Bogotá	
Bolívar	Laura Victoria Olascuaga Pinto	25	Cartagena	Miss Universe Colombia 2020
Boyacá	Laura Michelle Montañez Medina	24	Sogamoso	
Cabildo Encanto Amazonas	Dayana Cárdenas Mestra	22	Valledupar	Top 6
Caldas	Juliana Aristizábal Bríñez	24	Armenia	Top 16
Caquetá	Luisa Fernanda Ardila Quiñones	23	El Doncello	
Cartagena	Marelis Salas Julio	25	María La Baja	Top 16
Casanare	Gina Paola Cazarán Bohórquez	25	Villanueva	Top 16
Cauca	Bárbara Rodríguez Nazarith	28	Buenos Aires	Top 6
Cesar	Mary Trini Araque Díaz	21	Valledupar	Top 16
Chocó	Yuri Vanessa Copete Mosquera	28	Quibdó	
Córdoba	Carolina Guerra Agámez	23	Medellín	
Cundinamarca	Daniela Valentina Mejía Forero	20	Soacha	
Guaviare	Xiomara Alfonso	26	El Retorno	
Huila	María José Vargas Fierro	20	Neiva	Top 16
La Guajira	María Victoria Martínez Daza	27	Bogotá	
Magdalena	Natalia Garizabal Vera	18	Santa Marta	
Meta	María Juliana Franco Ramos	27	Villavicencio	Top 16
Nariño	Dahiara García	23	Yumbo	Top 16
Norte de Santander	Jenifer Pulgarín Candelo	25	Pereira	1st Runner-Up
Putumayo	Ximena Cataleya Candelo Hurtado	24	Puerto Tejada	
Quindío	Yeraldin Grajales Arias	27	Montenegro	Top 6
Risaralda	Alejandra Buitrago Carrasquilla	23	Pereira	
Santander	Laura Juliana Lamus Vargas	23	Bucaramanga	2nd Runner-Up
Tolima	Juanita Sánchez González	18	Bogotá	
Valle del Cauca	Angie Patricia Cuero Reina	18	Buenaventura	Top 16
Vichada	Vanessa Saavedra Vega	26	Armenia	
