= Sreypii Phorn =

Cambodian beauty pageant titleholder

- Born: Cambodia
- Beauty pageant titleholder
- Title: Miss Intercontinental Cambodia 2024; Miss Cosmo Cambodia 2025
- Major competitions: Mr & Miss Cambodia Korawin 2018 (Top 10); Miss Grand Cambodia 2024 (5th Runner-up); Miss Intercontinental 2024 (Top 22); Miss Cosmo Cambodia 2025 (Winner); Miss Cosmo 2025 (Top 21)

Sreypii Phorn (Khmer: ផន ស្រីពី) is a Cambodian beauty pageant titleholder who won Miss Cosmo Cambodia 2025, and reached the top 22 of Miss Intercontinental 2024. She represented Cambodia at Miss Cosmo 2025, where she placed in the Top 21.

== Pageantry ==
=== Miss Grand Cambodia 2024 ===
Phorn represented Kampong Cham at Miss Grand Cambodia 2024. She the fifth runner-up, with the title of Miss Grand Kampong Cham 2024.

=== Miss Intercontinental 2024 ===
Phorn represented Cambodia at Miss Intercontinental 2024 held in Egypt and reached the top 22.

=== Miss Cosmo Cambodia 2025 ===
On May 30, 2025, Phorn won Miss Cosmo Cambodia 2025.

=== Miss Cosmo 2025 ===
Phorn represented Cambodia at Miss Cosmo 2025 where she placed in the Top 21.

Awards and achievements
Preceded by Leakena In	Miss Cosmo Cambodia; 2025	Succeeded by Incumbent
Preceded by Sim Chansreymom	Miss Intercontinental Cambodia; 2024	Succeeded by Hok Sarytola
