= Miss Cosmo =

International beauty pageant

- Miss Cosmo logo
- Parent organization: UNICorp; UNIMedia
- Headquarters: Ho Chi Minh City, Vietnam
- First edition: 2024
- Most recent edition: 2025
- Current titleholder: Yolina Lindquist; United States
- Founder: Trần Việt Bảo Hoàng
- President: Trần Ngọc Nhật
- CEO: Trần Việt Bảo Hoàng
- Language: English, Vietnamese
- Website: misscosmo.com

Miss Cosmo (mis•ˈkɒzmɒ) is an annual international beauty pageant owned by UNICorp and UNIMedia in Ho Chi Minh City, Vietnam. Founded in August 2023 under the leadership of Trần Việt Bảo Hoàng, it held its inaugural competition in October 2024.

The current titleholder is Yolina Lindquist from the US, who was crowned at Creative Park in Ho Chi Minh City, Vietnam, on December 20, 2025.

== History ==
In 2023, the Miss Universe franchise in Vietnam was awarded to a new national licensee. Meanwhile, Hoa Hậu Hoàn Vũ Việt Nam continued as an independent pageant with the new English title Miss Cosmo Vietnam, separate from the Miss Universe Vietnam competition. Following the split, the winner of Hoa Hậu Hoàn Vũ Việt Nam was no longer titled Miss Universe Vietnam, and on 1 August, it was announced that the pageant's English title would be Miss Cosmo Vietnam. The associated reality television series was also renamed I Am Miss Cosmo Vietnam.

Further changes regarding the recent rebranding were announced at the press release on 7 August 2023, including the discontinuation of the second runner-up title, the decision to no longer send delegates to Miss Charm, and giving the audience the power to judge contestants' performances throughout the final.

On 12 August 2023, UNICorp announced that they had held a new international pageant called Miss Cosmo. The winner of Miss Cosmo Vietnam will be the country's next representative in this pageant. Trần Việt Bảo Hoàng, the CEO of Miss Cosmo Vietnam, is the founder, initiator, and CEO of this pageant.

The winner will receive prizes such as cash, a one-year stay in an apartment, a modeling contract, and the opportunity to represent the pageant internationally. Additionally, the winner will serve as an ambassador for charitable initiatives supported by Miss Cosmo, focusing on diversity and inclusion in the beauty industry.

The first edition of Miss Cosmo took place in Ho Chi Minh City on September to 5 October 2024. The pageant had contestants from more than 82 countries and territories, though some countries had withdrawn before the final.

The inaugural edition of Miss Cosmo 2024 competition was hosted by MC Duc Bao and Kylie Verzosa, Miss International 2016. With the board of judges, Paula Shugart, former President of the Miss Universe pageant, Harnaaz Sandhu, Miss Universe 2021, Nguyen Huynh Kim Duyen, second runner-up Miss Supranational 2022, George Chien, Co-founder, CEO and President of KC Global Media. Pham Quang Vinh, Vietnam's Former Deputy Minister of Foreign Affairs and Former Ambassador of Vietnam to the United States and H'Hen Nie, top five Miss Universe 2018 and Ambassador of Miss Cosmo 2024 competition.

=== Format ===
The Miss Cosmo competition is typically held over a three-week period, during which delegates take part in organized activities such as fashion shows, cultural events, charitable engagements, and promotional appearances. Prior to the final event, contestants are evaluated in a jury session that includes evening gown and swimsuit presentations, as well as a closed-door interview. The final show follows an elimination format, beginning with a Top 21 selected from jury session scores, including an automatic placement for the Social Ambassador award recipient. This is reduced to a Top 10 for the evening gown segment, with one spot reserved for the People’s Choice Award winner, followed by a Top 5 who advance to the interview round. The competition then narrows to a Top 2, who participate in a final debate round focused on their social projects. The event concludes with the announcement of the winner and runner-up, both of whom receive crowns, with the winner also signing a contract with the Miss Cosmo Organization and receiving additional prizes and benefits.

== The Miss Cosmo crown ==
After an international crown design competition, Cosmo's Utopia, the Impactful Crown and Tiara were selected, representing the message of Impactful Beauty. The crown and tiara were designed by Vietnamese artist Tran Chi Nguyen and crafted by Ngoc Chau Au. The crown is made of platinum, features a 22-carat emerald blue diamond, along with 122 carats of synthetic diamonds and 116 carats of blue sapphires. The tiara is also made of platinum, and includes a central blue sapphire, with 81 carats of marquise sapphires and 86 carats of synthetic diamonds.

== Titleholders ==
Year	Edition	Miss Cosmo	Runner-up	Host location	Entrants	Ref.
2025	2nd	Yolina Lindquist; United States	Chelsea Fernandez; Philippines	Ho Chi Minh City, Vietnam	71	
2024	1st	Ketut Permata Juliastrid; Indonesia	Karnruethai Tassabut; Thailand	Ho Chi Minh City, Vietnam	56	

Countries/Territories by number of wins
Country/Territory	Titles	Year(s)
Indonesia	1	2024
United States	1	2025

Continents by number of wins
Continents	Titles	Country (Number)
Asia	1	Indonesia (1)
Africa	0	
Americas	1	United States (1)
Europe	0	
Oceania	0	

=== Winners gallery ===
2025, Yolina Lindquist, United States

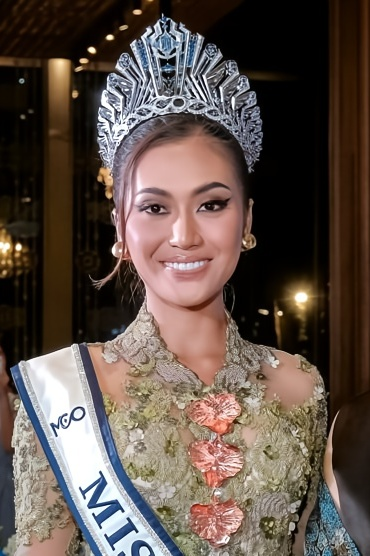
2024, Ketut Permata Juliastrid, Indonesia

== See also ==
Miss Cosmo Nepal
