= Miss Grand Zambia =

Zambian beauty pageant title

- Formation: 2014
- Type: Beauty pageant
- Headquarters: Lusaka
- Location: Zambia
- Members: Miss Grand International
- Official language: English
- National director: Isabel Chikoti
- Parent organization: Miss Earth Zambia (2014); Beautiful Soul Ltd. (2018 – 2019); Arm Model Management Zambia (2025 – Present)

Miss Grand Zambia is a national beauty pageant title awarded to Zambian representatives competing at the Miss Grand International pageant. The title was first awarded to former Miss Earth Zambia 2013, Winnie-Fredah Kabwe, Another withdrawal was also observed in 2019 when the appointed Luwi Kawanda refused to go Venezuela for the Miss Grand International 2019 competition due to security concerns.

Even though several Zambian representatives for Miss Grand International were determined, only one of them, Isabel Chikoti in 2018, managed to partake in the international contest, but she received a non-placement.

== History ==
Initially, Zambia was expected to make its debut in Miss Grand International in 2014 after former Miss Earth Zambia 2013, Winnie-Fredah Kabwe, was assigned by the Miss Earth Zambia organizer to represent the country on the international stage in Thailand, but she withdrew for unknown reasons.

Zambia made an actual debut in 2018 when former Miss Universe Zambia 2017, Isabel Chikoti, purchased the license and dominated herself as the country representative at the international competition held in Myanmar, but she was unplaced. After finishing the international tournament and returning to her home country, Isabel renewed the license for the 2019 edition and subsequently opened an online application to select the next representative, and Luwi Kawanda, who previously obtained the 2nd runner-up in the Miss Universe Zambia 2017 was elected the winner. Nonetheless, Security concerns in the host country, Venezuela, caused Kawanda to withdraw from the competition, and she was instead sent to compete at the Miss International 2019 in Japan, but she was unplaced.

After 6 consecutive years of absence, Zambia returned to Miss Grand International in 2025, under the directorship of Arm Model Management Zambia, the organizer of another national contest Miss Universe Zambia.

Gallery

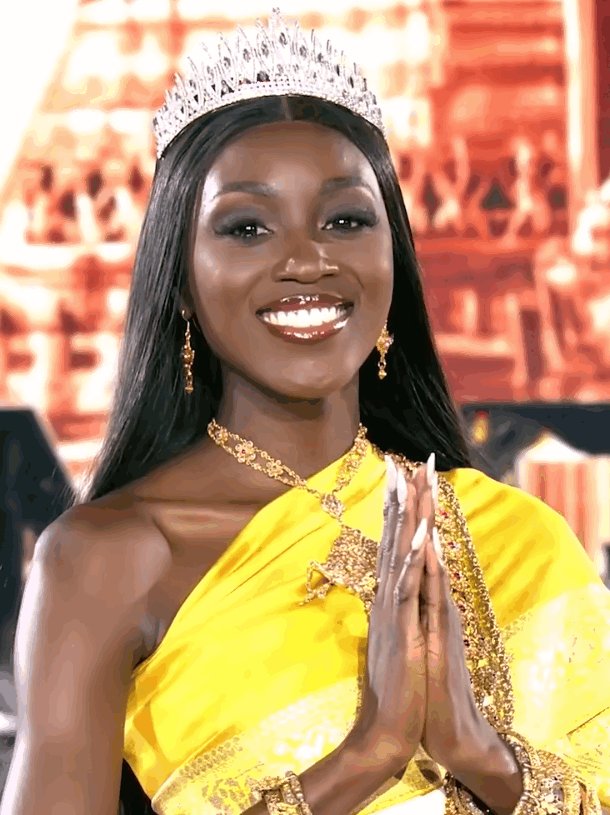
Anna Musonda
Miss Grand Zambia 2025

== International competition ==
The following is a list of Zambian representatives at the Miss Grand International contest.

Color keys

- : Declared as the winner
- : Ended as a runner-up (Top 5)
- : Ended as a finalist (Top 10)
- : Ended as a semifinalist (Top 20/21)
- : Ended as special awards winner

Year	Miss Grand Zambia	Title	Placement	Special Awards	National Director
2026	Charity Mumba	Miss Grand Zambia 2026 (Note: One of the main titles in the 2026 Big Five Zambia national pageant.)	Did not compete		Alice Rowland’s Musukwa
2025	Anna Musonda	Miss Grand Zambia 2025 (Note: Supplemental title at the Miss Universe Zambia 2025 pageant.)	Top 22	Runner-up – Grand Talent Award	Alice Rowland’s Musukwa
Did not compete between 2020-2024
2019	Luwi Kawanda	2nd runner-up Miss Universe Zambia 2017	Did not compete		Isabel Chikoti
2018	Isabel Chikoti	Miss Universe Zambia 2017	Unplaced		Isabel Chikoti
Did not compete between 2015-2017
2014	Winnie-Fredah Kabwe	Miss Earth Zambia 2013	Did not compete		Catherine Constantinides
