= The Voice of Finland season 13 =

Season overview of the 13th season of The Voice of Finland

The 13th season of The Voice of Finland started airing on January 19, 2024. Star coaches Elastinen and Maija Vilkkumaa continued from the previous season, and were joined by Sanni and Arttu Wiskari. The hosts for the 13th season are Heikki Paasonen and Jaana Pelkonen. The program is broadcast on TV in Finland to the channel Nelonen and is available through the Ruutu+ subscription service. Parts of the show are posted to YouTube as well. The season consists of four different phases; the Blind Auditions, Battles, Knock-Outs and Live broadcasts. "The Cut" from the previous season has been omitted.

The show features contestants from various backgrounds. While many of them have not been in the public eye before, there may be familiar faces among them as well. For example, Emil Hallberg, an actor and dancer known from Finnish TV series "Salatut elämät" and the son of dancer Helena Ahti-Hallberg; Tina Sandqvist, who participated in season 4 of The Voice of Finland in 2015; and Sini Ikävalko, a pastor and participant of the 6th season of the show, who was dubbed "laulavana pastorina" (English: "the singing pastor") back in the day

The season also has a larger than usual international representation, featuring Lisa Dumchieva, a doctor who fled Ukraine due to the Russian invasion; Diego Hernandez Campos, who is originally from Mexico and lives in Helsinki; Isabel Chikoti, a Zambian model who lives in Espoo and who won Miss Zambia and was Zambia's representative at Miss Universe in 2017; and Yannick Schuurmans, a student from the Netherlands who lives in Lappeenranta.

== Blind Auditions ==
✔	Coach pressed the "I WANT YOU" button
	Contestant chose this coach's team
	Contestant was placed on this coach's team
	None of the coaches pressed the "I WANT YOU" button (the contestant does not continue)
✘	The coach was blocked by another coach
	The coach was blocked by Maija
	The coach was blocked by Arttu
	The coach was blocked by Sanni
	The coach was blocked by Elastinen

=== Episode 1 (Friday January 19, 2024) ===
Order	Contestant	Age and place of residence	Song	Contestants' and coaches' selections			
Order	Contestant	Age and place of residence	Song	Maija Vilkkumaa	Arttu Wiskari	Sanni	Elastinen
1	Janne Ryynänen	43, Tampere	"Cochise"	✔	✔	✔	✔
2	Annamaria Heikkinen	38, Kuopio	"Valo"	✔	✔	✔	—
3	Siiri Parkki	20, Helsinki	"Pulp Fiction"	—	—	—	—
4	Chrisu Romberg	37, Porvoo	"Stay with Me"	✔	✔	—	✔
5	Noora Visuri	31, Ylivieska	"Gravity"	—	✔	✔	✔
6	Eetu Qvist	40, Kuopio	"Pointless"	—	—	—	—
7	Heidi Simelius	29, Tampere	"Sama nainen"	✔	✔	—	—
8	Mikael Juva	23, Helsinki	"Love Yourself"	✘	✔	✔	✔

=== Episode 2 (Sunday January 21, 2024) ===
Order	Contestant	Age and place of residence	Song	Contestants' and coaches' selections			
Order	Contestant	Age and place of residence	Song	Maija Vilkkumaa	Arttu Wiskari	Sanni	Elastinen
1	Jesse de Jong	28, Tampere	"Your Man"	—	✔	—	✔
2	Ellinor Nordman	20, Hanko	"Drömlänges"	✔	—	—	—
3	Joni Parkkinen	26, Joensuu	"Hypa Hypa"	—	—	—	—
4	Samuli Kakko	31, Oulu	"The Show Must Go On"	✔	✔	✔	✔
5	Susanna Korhonen	35, Helsinki	"Boat"	—	✔	—	✘
6	Sanja Koskinen	35, Kangasala	"Tequilakahvi"	—	—	—	—
7	Mark Honkanen	34, Laukaa	"Blood in the Water"	✔	—	—	✔
8	Janita Hissa	24, Seinäjoki	"The Loneliest"	—	—	—	—
9	Iiro Pitkälä	21, Pori	"All of Me"	✔	✔	✔	✔

=== Episode 3 (Friday January 26, 2024) ===
Order	Contestant	Age and place of residence	Song	Contestants' and coaches' selections			
Order	Contestant	Age and place of residence	Song	Maija Vilkkumaa	Arttu Wiskari	Sanni	Elastinen
1	Juho Väliaho	37, Kuopio	"Desperado"	✔	✔	—	✔
2	Elizabeth Krause	16, Helsinki	"Flawless Execution"	✔	✔	✘	✔
3	Anni Vesterinen	23, Kouvola	"Goodnight Moon"	—	—	—	—
4	Tomas Ahlroos	40, Kuopio	"Keep the Faith"	—	—	—	✔
5	Emil Hallberg	28, Sipoo	"Gorilla"	—	✔	—	✔
6	Lumi Tagliavini	19, Helsinki	"Yksinäisen keijun tarina"	—	—	—	—
7	Emma Eklund	19, Parainen	"Hold Me Closer"	—	—	✔	—
8	Jukka Vuokila	61, Riihimäki, Oulu	"You'll Be in My Heart"	—	—	—	—
9	Esko Heinonen	33, Pietarsaari	"Walking in Memphis"	✔	✔	✔	✔

=== Episode 4 (Friday February 2, 2024) ===
Order	Contestant	Age and place of residence	Song	Contestants' and coaches' selections			
Order	Contestant	Age and place of residence	Song	Maija Vilkkumaa	Arttu Wiskari	Sanni	Elastinen
1	Anssi Väinö	26, Helsinki	"Nahkatakkinen tyttö"	✔	—	—	—
2	Hanna Silander	42, Turku	"Annie's Song"	✔	—	✔	✔
3	Mimosa Klotz	18, Uusikaupunki	"Tivolit"	—	—	—	—
4	Jaromir Jokinen	22, Hämeenlinna	"Summer of ’69"	✔	✔	—	—
5	Sanna Syrjänen	47, Tampere	"Pimeyden tango"	—	—	—	—
6	Saara & Sofia (Saara Rantala & Sofia Rankinen)	28, Lumijoki & 32, Oulu	"Kathy's Song"	✔	—	✔	✔
7	Jussi Salli	34, Kokkola	"She Looks So Perfect"	—	—	—	—
8	Lisa Dumchieva	31, Jurva	"Namaljuju tobi zori"	✔	✔	✔	✔
9	Jari Uutela	42, Tampere	"Kemiaa"	—	—	—	—
10	Eetu-Pekka Heiskanen	32, Lahti	"Still Loving You"	✔	—	✔	✔

=== Episode 5 (Sunday February 4, 2024) ===
Order	Contestant	Age and place of residence	Song	Contestants' and coaches' selections			
Order	Contestant	Age and place of residence	Song	Maija Vilkkumaa	Arttu Wiskari	Sanni	Elastinen
1	Helmi Tammenpää	24, Helsinki	"New York"	✔	✔	—	✘
2	Sanni Liljeblad	16, Helsinki	"Lady Domina"	—	—	—	—
3	Diego Hernandez Campos	24, Helsinki	"La Condena"	—	—	—	—
4	Neili Airikka	30, Rauma	"Jos mä kuolen nuorena"	—	✔	—	✔
5	Laura Ruusumaa	32, Helsinki	"Rolling in the Deep"	✔	—	—	✔
6	Ellen Smulter	24, Maarianhamina	"Regnar och regnar"	—	—	—	—
7	Janne Komppa	26, Vantaa	"Sixteen Tons"	✔	✔	—	✔
8	Bambi L	29, Helsinki	"All Right Now"	✔	—	—	—
9	Juha Falck	40, Helsinki	"Mr. Brightside"	—	—	—	—
10	Mikko Pihlajamaa	28, Kokkola	"Amen"	✔	✔	✔	✔

=== Episode 6 (Friday February 9, 2024) ===
Order	Contestant	Age and place of residence	Song	Contestants' and coaches' selections			
Order	Contestant	Age and place of residence	Song	Maija Vilkkumaa	Arttu Wiskari	Sanni	Elastinen
1	Jenni Johansson	27, Pietarsaari	"This Woman's Work"	✔	✔	✔	✔
2	Kari Komulainen	57, Janakkala	"Yksi vain ei tuu"	—	—	—	—
3	Fanny Virsula	19, Kaarina	"Aamu"	✔	✔	—	—
4	Vilhelm Lillmåns	31, Pedersöre	"När vindarna viskar mitt namn"	—	—	—	—
5	Tina Sandqvist	35, Espoo	"Love Hurts"	—	✔	✔	—
6	Anna Lumikivi	36, Ivalo	"Ton < 3 Mon – You < 3 Me"	✔	✔	—	✔
7	Joonas Vesalainen	30, Lahti	"Pokka"	—	—	—	—
8	Riitta Hotari	25, Joensuu	"Nothing Breaks Like a Heart"	—	—	—	—
9	Erkka Helenius	37, Lahti	"Jeremy"	✔	—	—	—
10	Isabel Chikoti	32, Espoo	"Stand Up"	✔	✔	—	✔

=== Episode 7 (Friday February 16, 2024) ===
Order	Contestant	Age and place of residence	Song	Contestants' and coaches' selections			
Order	Contestant	Age and place of residence	Song	Maija Vilkkumaa	Arttu Wiskari	Sanni	Elastinen
1	Matias Helenius	26, Raisio	"The A Team"	✔	✔	✔	✔
2	Toni Taipale	28, Veteli	"Kultaa hiuksissa"	✔	—	—	—
3	Aliina Salmela	22, Helsinki	"Rikollinen"	—	—	—	—
4	Manu Lehtimäki	22, Turku	"Sut puhallan pois"	✔	✔	—	—
5	Veera Löhönen	22, Kajaani	"Stricken"	—	—	—	—
6	Alina Knuutila	16, Lieto	"If I Ain't Got You"	✔	✔	✔	✔
7	Joakim Jakobsson	40, Vaasa	"The Scientist"	—	—	—	—
8	Yannick Schuurmans	20, Lappeenranta	"Home"	—	✘	✔	✔
9	Tuuli Korkeamäki	17, Helsinki	"I See the Light"	—	✔	—	✔

=== Episode 8 (Sunday February 18, 2024) ===
Order	Contestant	Age and place of residence	Song	Contestants' and coaches' selections			
Order	Contestant	Age and place of residence	Song	Maija Vilkkumaa	Arttu Wiskari	Sanni	Elastinen
1	Marju Inkinen	53, Sastamala	"Times Like These"	✔	—	—	✔
2	Oscar Björkell	22, Turku	"Decode"	—	—	✔	✔
3	Annika Lehto	25, Turku	"Human"	✔	—	—	—
4	Vesa Kokko	46, Kouvola	"En koskaan"	—	—	—	—
5	Anni Kela	22, Turku	"All I Wanted"	—	—	—	—
6	Janne Alaperä	30, Jyväskylä	"Silta yli synkän virran"	✔	✔	—	✔
7	Henrika Nieminen	40, Tampere	"Rather Be"	—	—	—	—
8	Emmi Kettunen	19, Savonlinna	"Toxic"	✔	✔	—	—
9	Marita El Idrysy	55, Tornio	"Sinä vain"	—	—	—	—
10	Karlo Haapiainen	35, Helsinki	"I Can't Make You Love Me"	✔	✔	✔	✔

=== Episode 9 (Friday February 23, 2024) ===
Order	Contestant	Age and place of residence	Song	Contestants' and coaches' selections			
Order	Contestant	Age and place of residence	Song	Maija Vilkkumaa	Arttu Wiskari	Sanni	Elastinen
1	Marko Turunen	37, Lohja	"Through Glass"	✔	✘	✔	✔
2	Tarja Aro	60, Forssa	"Sä mulle päivänpaisteen toit"	—	—	—	—
3	Evelia Luhtala	18, Helsinki	"Anteeks"	—	✔	—	✔
4	Markus Perttula	39, Helsinki	"Last Goodbye"	✔	—	✔	—
5	Sini Ikävalko	46, Helsinki	"Hunajainen"	—	—	—	—
6	Linda Isufi	27, Vantaa	"Ghetto"	✔	✔	—	✔
7	Aada Nuutinen	18, Seinäjoki	"Video Games"	—	—	—	—
8	Lasse Selin	74, Helsinki	"Taikuri"	—	—	—	—
9	Pihla Eskelinen	19, Oulu	"Funeral"	—	—	✔	✘

== Viewing figures ==
Episode	Description	Esityspäivä	Viewing figures^{1}	Program reach^{2}	Source
1	Blind Audition 1	Friday January 19, 2024	617 000	968 000	
2	Blind Audition 2	Sunday January 21, 2024	485 000	779 000	
3	Blind Audition 3	Friday January 26, 2024	427 000	739 000	
4	Blind Audition 4	Friday February 2, 2024	531 000	879 000	
5	Blind Audition 5	Sunday February 4, 2024	542 000	852 000	
6	Blind Audition 6	Friday February 9, 2024	578 000	872 000	
7	Blind Audition 7	Friday February 16, 2024	650 000	932 000	
8	Blind Audition 8	Sunday February 18, 2024	439 000	682 000	

^{1} Average number of viewers during the program.

^{2} Number of program viewers that viewed at least 3 consecutive minutes.
