= Miss Cosmo 2026 =

Third Miss Cosmo pageant

- Date: 16 January 2027
- Venue: World Tea Resort, Tri Nguyen Island, Nha Trang, Khánh Hòa, Vietnam
- Debuts: Algeria; Angola; Argentina; Bosnia and Herzegovina; Botswana; Czech Republic; Equatorial Guinea; Ethiopia; Great Britain; Jamaica; Kazakhstan; Kenya; Lebanon; Norway; Saudi Arabia; Slovakia; Somalia; Zambia
- Returns: Armenia; Chile; Côte d'Ivoire; Egypt; Ghana; Guinea; Honduras; Portugal

Miss Cosmo 2026 will be the third edition of the Miss Cosmo pageant.

Yolina Lindquist of the United States will crown her successor at the conclusion of the event.

== Location and date ==
The third Miss Cosmo pageant will be held in Nha Trang, Khánh Hòa, Vietnam, from 25 December 2026 to 16 January 2027.

== Selection of participants ==
Malaika Mushandu of Zimbabwe withdrew from the competition after being stripped of her title by the national organization.

== The Cosmo CEO Challenge ==
=== Bare Face, Real Beauty ===
| Placement | Contestant |
|---|---|
| Winners | Canada – Jabili Kandula; India – Avani Kakekochhi |

== Contestants ==
The confirmed contestants are as follows:

| Country/Territory | Contestant | Age (Note: Ages at the time of the pageant) | Hometown | Ref. |
|---|---|---|---|---|
| Algeria | Alexandra Djaffer | 28 | Dubai | |
| Angola | Margarida Txiiyúca | 26 | Lunda-Norte | |
| Argentina | Carolina Danieri | 32 | Posadas | |
| Armenia | Naira Castro | 18 | Vagharshapat | |
| Australia | Valentina Namnoum | 24 | Sydney | |
| Bolivia | Gabriela Su | 30 | La Paz | |
| Bosnia and Herzegovina | Sadina Dudić | 28 | Sanski Most | |
| Botswana | Christina Vanstaden | 27 | Kgalagadi | |
| Brazil | Dallis Costa | 26 | São José dos Pinhais | |
| Cambodia | Sotheary By | 28 | Phnom Penh | |
| Canada | Jabili Kandula | 26 | Mississauga | |
| Chile | Jesús Honorato | 29 | Las Condes | |
| China | Aven Tang | 25 | Lanzhou | |
| Colombia | Juliana Franco | 33 | Villavicencio | |
| Côte d'Ivoire | Nanan Fofana | 25 | Koyaka | |
| Cuba | Vanessa Villareal | 32 | Havana | |
| Czech Republic | Jana Marvanová | 30 | Ústí nad Labem | |
| Dominican Republic | Michelle Jiménez | 24 | Palma de Mallorca | |
| Ecuador | Nicole Roldán | 20 | Machala | |
| Egypt | Dalia Varde | 23 | Las Piñas | |
| El Salvador | Alejandra Guajardo | 31 | Cabañas | |
| Equatorial Guinea | Carmen Obama | 20 | Mongomo | |
| Ethiopia | Luwan Tesfay | 18 | Adama | |
| Finland | Tara Lehtonen | 24 | Rauma | |
| France | Laura Hérault | 25 | Martinique | |
| Germany | Jessika Rasvanta | 21 | Augsburg | |
| Ghana | Afia Adusei Sarpong | 27 | Accra | |
| Great Britain | Elisaveta Tikhonova | 23 | Glasgow | |
| Greece | Ziwei Varaki | 19 | Thessaloniki | |
| Guatemala | Verónica Mejía | 24 | Guatemala City | |
| Guinea | Matôma Condé | 23 | Faranah | |
| Guyana | Colline Ward | 30 | Bartica | |
| Haiti | Nadgeena Jerome | 31 | Brooklyn | |
| Honduras | Yariela García | 30 | Tegucigalpa | |
| Hong Kong | Mengyu Ye | 30 | Beijing | |
| India | Avani Kakekochhi | 25 | Bengaluru | |
| Indonesia | Karina Moudy Widodo | 21 | Pati | |
| Jamaica | Tianna McDaniel | 26 | Westmoreland Parish | |
| Japan | Alina Ito | 26 | Okinawa | |
| Kazakhstan | Arulita Aman | 21 | Almaty | |
| Kenya | Linsey Zawadi | 23 | Embu | |
| Laos | Noy Laochongxoua | 25 | Nong Het | |
| Lebanon | Helyna Park | 18 | Cleveland | |
| Macau | Maggie Zhao | 19 | Guangzhou | |
| Malaysia | Carmenn Lee | 33 | Kuala Lumpur | |
| Malta | Arina Balzan | 18 | Msida | |
| Mexico | Esmeralda Meza | 27 | Querétaro | |
| Myanmar | Thae Su Nyein | 19 | Yangon | |
| Nepal | Kashis Subba | 21 | Dharan | |
| New Zealand | Hannah Cross | 22 | Tauranga | |
| Nicaragua | Milagros López | 23 | Managua | |
| Nigeria | Damilola Remi-Fakoya | 31 | Lagos | |
| Norway | Leonora Lysglimt-Rødland | 20 | Nordstrand | |
| Panama | Lainey Floeck | 25 | Chiriquí | |
| Peru | Nathie Quijano | 24 | Lima | |
| Philippines | Bella Ysmael | 30 | Taguig | |
| Portugal | Vânia Priscila | 31 | Braga | |
| Puerto Rico | Chelsey García | 29 | Añasco | |
| Russia | Yana Terekhova | 19 | Moskva | |
| Saudi Arabia | Rumy Alqahtani | 31 | Riyadh | |
| Singapore | Charlotte Chia | 29 | Singapore | |
| Slovakia | Karolína Ľuptáková | 20 | Bratislava | |
| Somalia | Khadija Omar | 25 | Mogadishu | |
| South Africa | Ayanda Thabethe | 27 | Pietermaritzburg | |
| Spain | Charlotte Harrison | 26 | Tenerife | |
| Tanzania | Prisca Lyimo | 28 | Arusha | |
| Thailand | Malaika Khan | 22 | Rim Khong | |
| Turkey | Sevcan Öksüz | 26 | Istanbul | |
| United Arab Emirates | Victoria Oshur | 27 | Ivano-Frankivsk | |
| United States | Alexis Johnson | 31 | Lynchburg | |
| United States Virgin Islands | Christell Foote | 28 | Rocky Top | |
| Venezuela | Paola Donquis | 21 | Valencia | |
| Vietnam | Cẩm Ly Đỗ | 23 | Phú Thọ | |
| Zambia | Kunda Mwamulima | 31 | Kalulushi | |
