= Kunda Mwamulima =

Zambian beauty pageant titleholder

- Born: Kunda Mwamulima; July 19, 1995 (age 31); Kalulushi, Zambia
- Education: Levy Mwanawasa Medical University
- Height: 173 cm (5 ft 8 in)
- Beauty pageant titleholder
- Title: Miss Culture Zambia 2020; Miss Universe Zambia 2025; Miss Earth Zambia 2023; Miss Cosmo Zambia 2026
- Hair color: Black
- Eye color: Black
- Major competitions: Miss University Africa 2021 (Unplaced) Miss Earth Zambia 2023 (Winner) Miss Earth 2023 (Unplaced) Miss Universe Zambia 2025 (Winner ); Miss Universe 2025 (Unplaced) Miss Cosmo 2026 (TBD)

Kunda Mwamulima is a Zambian nurse, model, and beauty pageant titleholder. She won Miss Universe Zambia 2025 and Miss Earth Zambia 2023. She will represent Zambia at Miss Cosmo 2026.

== Early life ==
Kunda Mwamulima was born in 1995 in Kalulushi, Zambia, and has lived in Lusaka. Mwamulima previously lived in other parts of Copperbelt Province, including Kitwe. She studied nursing at Levy Mwanawasa Medical University in Lusaka, becoming the first member of her family to attend university.

After graduating, she has worked as a nurse at a hospital in her hometown. She won Miss Culture Zambia 2020. On March 2, 2023, she also represented Zambia at the Top Model of the World 2023 pageant, where she placed in the Top 16.

== Pageantry ==
=== Miss University Africa 2021 ===
Kunda represented Zambia for the first time at Miss University Africa 2021. She did not win any awards.

=== Miss Earth 2023 ===
On October 25, 2023, she was crowned Miss Earth Zambia 2023 and went on to represent the country at Miss Earth 2023, held in Vietnam on December 22, 2023.

As Miss Earth Zambia 2023, Mwamulima advocated for agroecology, ecotourism, and the preservation of cultural heritage. She also helped raise awareness about climate change and campaigned against automotive carbon emissions.

=== Miss Universe 2025 ===
On April 20, 2025, representing Kalulushi, she competed in the Miss Universe Zambia 2025 pageant against 19 other contestants at the Mulungushi International Conference Centre in Lusaka, Zambia. She won the title and went on to represent the country at Miss Universe 2025 in Thailand on November 21, 2025.

=== Miss Cosmo 2026 ===
On May 11, 2026, she was awarded the title of Miss Cosmo Zambia 2026 during the Miss Universe Zambia 2026 grand finale, becoming Zambia's first representative at Miss Cosmo 2026.

On August 18, 2026, she traveled to Vietnam to attend press conferences for Miss Cosmo 2026 at the GEM Center in Ho Chi Minh City, Vietnam and The Face Vietnam 2026.

Awards and achievements
Preceded by Brandina Lubuli	Miss Universe Zambia; 2025	Succeeded by Mubanga Hatyoka
Preceded by Joyce Mwanza	Miss Earth Zambia; 2023	Incumbent
Preceded by None	Miss Cosmo Zambia; 2026	Incumbent
