= Wiskari =

Wiskari is a surname. Notable people with the surname include:

- Arttu Wiskari (born 1984), Finnish singer-songwriter
- Werner Wiskari (1918–2008), Finnish-American journalist
