= Matôma Condé =

Guinean beauty pageant titleholder

- Born: Matôma Condé; May 21, 2003 (age 23); Faranah, Guinea
- Education: Kofi Annan University of Guinea
- Height: 175 cm (5 ft 9 in)
- Beauty pageant titleholder
- Title: Miss Guinea 2025
- Hair color: Black
- Eye color: Black
- Major competitions: Miss Guinea 2025 (Winner); Miss Universe 2026 (Withdrew); Miss Cosmo 2026 (TBD)

Matôma Condé is a Guinean model and beauty pageant titleholder who won Miss Guinea 2025. She will represent Guinea at Miss Cosmo 2026.

== Early life ==
Matoma Condé was born on May 21, 2003, in Faranah and later moved to Conakry. While studying, she competed at beauty pageants. Condé studied at the Faculty of Law and Political Science at the Kofi Annan University of Guinea.

She had previously won titles in other beauty pageants, such as Miss SETIFANA 2022, and placed as second runner-up in the Miss Université contest in Guinea.

== Pageantry ==
=== Miss Guinea 2025 ===
Matoma participated in the Miss Guinea 2025, a national beauty contest organized by the Miss Guinea Committee (COOMISGUI) to select Guinea's representative for international competitions such as Miss Universe.

The event took place on December 14, 2025, in Conakry, featuring 24 contestants representing various regions of the country. She was crowned Miss Guinea 2025, receiving the crown directly from the first lady of Guinea, Lauriane Doumbouya.

Matoma succeeded Tiguidanké Bérété as Miss Guinea and became an ambassador for Guinea's cultural and social values and the cause of women for the 2026 term. During her tenure, she also received awards—including a scholarship, a vehicle, land, and a cash prize—to be distributed in installments throughout her term.

=== Miss Cosmo 2026 ===
She will represent Guinea at Miss Cosmo 2026, which will take place in Vietnam in early 2027.

Awards and achievements
Preceded by Tiguidanké Bérété	Miss Guinea; 2025	Incumbent
Preceded by Saran Kourouma	Miss Cosmo Guinea; 2026	Incumbent
