= Tag-init =

2023 Filipino film

- Directed by: Jose Javier Reyes
- Written by: Jose Javier Reyes
- Produced by: Vincent del Rosario III
- Starring: Franki Russell; Yen Durano; Clifford Pusing
- Cinematography: Jan Oliver Evangelista
- Edited by: Chrisel Desuasido
- Music by: Jesse Lucas
- Production companies: Viva Films; LargaVista Entertainment
- Distributed by: Vivamax
- Release date: January 20, 2023
- Running time: 91 minutes
- Country: Philippines
- Languages: Filipino; English

Tag-init (lit. 'Summer') is a 2023 coming of age, erotic drama film written and directed by Jose Javier Reyes and starring Franki Russell, Yen Durano and Clifford Pusing. The film was produced by Viva Films and LargaVista Entertainment and released on the streaming platform Vivamax on January 20, 2023.

== Synopsis ==
The story follows a 17-year-old teen (Pusing) who joins his older brother on a beach vacation with his friends and meets a beautiful but troubled woman (Russell) who is sheltered by a politician.

== Cast ==
- Clifford Pusing as Martin
- Franki Russell as Adele
- Yen Durano as Nadine
- Marc Acueza as Congressman Robbie Cerrudo
- Axel Torres as Simon
- Ali Asistio as Chino
- Aerol Carmelo as Paolo Villagracia
- Rolando Inocencio as Manong Dado

== Production ==
Director Jose Javier Reyes, when asked about his ventures into making erotic films for Vivamax during the press conference of Tag-init, stated that "the very fact that you accept a Vivamax project, you know you're not doing The Sound of Music, right? [...] It's a matter of making sure that what you do is within your own limitations as well, and within your own principle... and Viva respects me for that."

Actor Marc Acueza asked permission from his wife before shooting for Tag-init his first sex scene for a film.

== Release ==
Tag-init was released on Vivamax on January 20, 2023. Prior to its release, an online conference for the film was held on January 9, with the film's trailer released the next day.

== Reception ==
Professional reviews

Review scores
- Source: Rating
journalnews.com.ph	—N/a
