= Miss Universe Maldives =

Beauty pageants in the Maldives

- Established: 2024; 2 years ago
- Purpose: Beauty pageant
- Official language: English
- Current titleholder: Aminath Yuin Mohamed
- National Director: Buddhika Nirmal Bandara
- Affiliations: Miss Universe

Miss Universe Maldives (Dhivehi: މިސް ޔުނިވާސް މާލްޑިވްސް) is a national beauty pageant to select the representative of the Maldives for the Miss Universe competition.

The country debuted at Miss Universe in 2024, with its first participation drawing public controversy in the Maldives.

== History ==
Miss Universe Maldives was officially announced on 12 July 2024, when the official Miss Universe Instagram account revealed that Ernest Hadrian Bőhm had been appointed as the National Director of Miss Universe Maldives, marking the country's debut in the Miss Universe competition. Mariyam Shaina Naseem was subsequently appointed as the first-ever Miss Universe Maldives and was selected to represent the country at Miss Universe 2024. Prior to the competition, Naseem reportedly faced pressure from domestic authorities and segments of the public due to religious concerns surrounding her participation. On 30 October 2024, Diego Pérez, Ambassador of Mexico to India, granted her a visa to travel to Mexico and compete in Miss Universe 2024. Naseem ultimately participated through her management company, He n She Maldives, without official support from the Maldivian government.

Following its debut at Miss Universe in 2024, the Maldives did not participate in the 2025 edition of the competition. In 2026, Buddhika Nirmal Bandara acquired the national franchise for Miss Universe Maldives and subsequently organized the Miss Universe Maldives 2026 and Miss Universe Sri Lanka 2026 pageants, which were held on 23 June 2026 in Colombo, Sri Lanka.

== Titleholders ==
- : Declared as Winner
- : Ended as runner-up or top 5/6 qualification
- : Ended as one of the finalists or semifinalists
- : Ended as special awards winner

| Year | Atoll | Miss Maldives | Placement at Miss Universe | Special Award | Note |
Buddika Nirmal Bandara a franchise holder since 2026
| 2026 | Malé | Aminath Yuin Mohamed | Did not compete | | |
Did not compete in 2025
Ernest Hadrian Bőhm a franchise holder in 2024
| 2024 | Malé | Mariyam Shaina Naseem | Unplaced | | Previously Top Model Maldives 2022 |

== See also ==
- Big Four beauty pageants
- List of beauty pageants
