= Varde (disambiguation) =

Varde is a city in southern Denmark.

Varde or Värde may also refer to:

== People ==
- Dalia Varde (born 2003), Filipina-Egyptian actress, model and beauty pageant titleholder
- Geetika Varde, Indian classical vocalist
- Joe Varde (born 1950), American road racer
- Sadanand Varde (1925-2007), Indian socialist leader, politician, and freedom fighter from Maharashtra

== Places ==
- Varde Municipality, Denmark
- Varde River, Denmark
- Varde (nomination district), Denmark

== Other ==
- Varde IF, an association football club based in Varde, Denmark
- Värde Partners, an investment management firm in New York City, US
