= Aven Tang =

Chinese beauty pageant titleholder

Tang Qiaowen; 汤荍文
- Born: Tang Qiaowen; February 4, 2001 (age 25); Lanzhou, Gansu, China
- Education: University of Science and Technology Beijing
- Height: 178 cm (70 in)
- Beauty pageant titleholder
- Title: Miss Cosmo China 2026
- Major competitions: Miss China World 2019; (Top 7); Miss Cosmo China 2026; (Winner); Miss Cosmo 2026; (TBD)

Tang Qiaowen (Chinese: 汤荍文; born February 4, 2001), known professionally as Aven Tang, is a Chinese model and beauty pageant titleholder who won Miss Cosmo China 2026. She will represent China at Miss Cosmo 2026 in Vietnam. She previously participated in Miss World China 2019 and reached the Top 7.

== Early life ==
Tang Qiaowen was born in 2001 in Lanzhou, Gansu, China. She graduated with a degree in Management Science and Engineering from the University of Science and Technology Beijing and has been pursuing her PhD as of 2026.

== Pageantry ==
=== Miss World China 2019 ===
She competed in Miss World China 2019 and reached the Top 7, with the title going to Li Peishan.

=== Miss Cosmo China 2026 ===
She competed in and won the Miss Cosmo China 2026 pageant, held on July 27, 2026, in Guangzhou. She was crowned by her predecessor, Yuexin Xiong, and the reigning Miss Cosmo 2025, Yolina Lindquist.

=== Miss Cosmo 2026 ===
She will represent China at Miss Cosmo 2026, held in Vietnam; she also attended the Miss Cosmo 2026 press conference on August 18, 2026, alongside Miss Cosmo Hong Kong 2026 Yemeng Yu and Miss Cosmo Macau 2026 Zhao Zimeng.

Awards and achievements
Preceded by Yuexin Xiong	Miss Cosmo China; 2026	Incumbent
