= Miss Earth Zambia =

Annual national beauty contest

- Formation: 2013
- Type: Beauty Pageant
- Headquarters: Lusaka
- Location: Zambia
- Members: Miss Earth
- Official language: English
- Website: Official page

The Miss Earth Zambia is a beauty pageant to select a delegate for Miss Earth pageant. The pageant is not related to Miss Universe Zambia or Miss Zambia pageants.

== Titleholders ==
Color key

- Declared as Winner
- Ended as runner-up
- Ended as one of the finalists or semifinalists

Year	Miss Earth Zambia	Hometown	Placement at Miss Earth	Special Awards
2022	Joyce Mwanza	Lusaka	Unplaced	
2021	Chilekwa Çhariće Kaluñģà	Lusaka	Withdrew	
2020	Muka Mimi Hamoonga	Lusaka	Unplaced	
2019	Venus Mary Vlahakis	Lusaka	Unplaced	(silver) National Costume (Africa)
2018	Margret Konie	Lusaka	Unplaced	(silver) National Costume (Africa)
2017	Abigail Chama	Lusaka	Unplaced	(bronze) Darling of the Press
2016	Katrina Ketty Kabaso	Lusaka	Unplaced	Seminar-Best Environmental project
Did not compete in 2015
2014	Cartier Zagorski	Lusaka	Top 16	(bronze) Evening Gown, (silver) Swimsuit, (bronze) Cocktail Wear
2013	Winnie-Fredah Kabwe	Lusaka	Unplaced	(bronze) Best Teacher
Did not compete between 2008—2012
2007	Sphiwe Mutale Benasho	Lusaka	Unplaced	
Did not compete in 2006
2005	Cynthia Kanema	Lusaka	Unplaced	
