= Miss Universe 2024 =

73rd edition of the Miss Universe competition

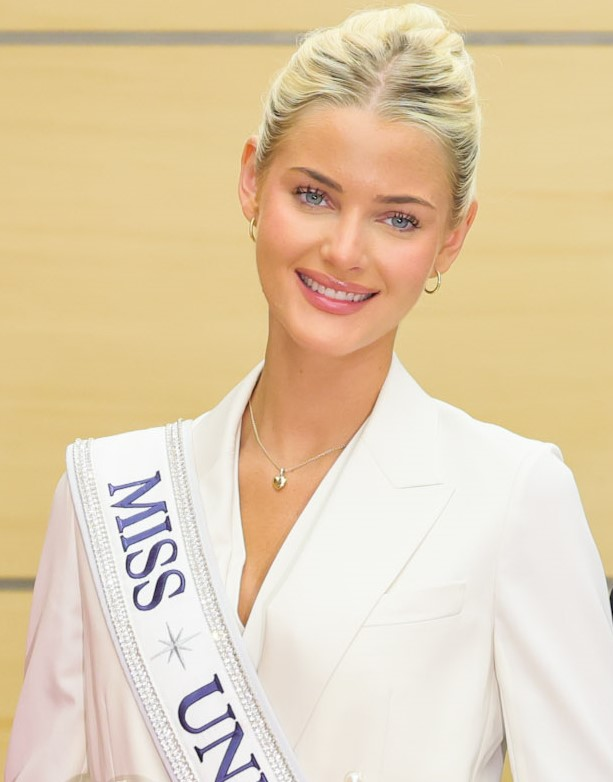
- Victoria Kjær Theilvig
- Date: 16 November 2024
- Presenters: Mario Lopez; Olivia Culpo; Catriona Gray; Zuri Hall
- Entertainment: Robin Thicke; Emilio Estefan; Taboo; Vikina; Nico Ruiz; Richaelio; The Mariachi
- Venue: Mexico City Arena, Mexico City, Mexico
- Broadcaster: Roku; Telemundo; TV Azteca; USA Network
- Entrants: 125
- Placements: 30
- Debuts: Belarus; Eritrea; Guinea; Iran; Macau; Maldives; Moldova; North Macedonia; Somalia; United Arab Emirates; Uzbekistan
- Withdrawals: Kosovo; Panama; South Africa
- Returns: Armenia; Bangladesh; Belize; Bonaire; Botswana; China; Côte d'Ivoire; Cuba; Cyprus; Democratic Republic of the Congo; Estonia; Fiji; Gibraltar; Guadeloupe; Hong Kong; Israel; Kenya; Kyrgyzstan; Martinique; Montenegro; New Zealand; Romania; Samoa; Senegal; Serbia; Sri Lanka; Suriname; Tanzania; Turkey; Turks and Caicos Islands; United States Virgin Islands; Uruguay; Zambia
- Winner: Victoria Kjær Theilvig; Denmark
- Congeniality: Jenelle Thongs, Trinidad and Tobago
- Best National Costume: Chelsea Manalo, Philippines

Miss Universe 2024 was the 73rd Miss Universe pageant, held at the Arena CDMX in Mexico City, Mexico, on 16 November 2024.

Victoria Kjær Theilvig of Denmark won the competition, succeeding Sheynnis Palacios of Nicaragua and becoming the first Danish woman to win the title.

Contestants from a record 125 countries and territories competed in the pageant, surpassing the previous record of 94 entrants set in 2018.

== Location and date ==
On 18 November 2023, at the Miss Universe 2023 pageant, Raúl Rocha, the owner of Legacy Holding Group USA Inc., announced that the 73rd edition of the Miss Universe pageant would be held in Mexico, which last hosted the pageant in 2007.

On 24 August 2024, the organizers announced that the pageant would be held at the Mexico City Arena, also known as Arena CDMX, on 16 November, with the preliminary rounds on 14 November.

== Selection of participants ==
Contestants from one hundred and twenty-five countries and territories were selected to compete in the pageant. Among the delegates, two were appointed to compete as the runner-up in their national pageant, (Note: Fatou Bintou Guèye of Senegal was the first runner-up in Miss Senegal 2024. Petra Siváková of Slovakia was the first runner-up in Miss Slovakia 2023.) sixteen were chosen through a casting process, (Note: Representatives from Angola, Bangladesh, Bonaire, the British Virgin Islands, Cyprus, the Czech Republic, Eritrea, Greece, Guinea, Macau, the Maldives, Nicaragua, Paraguay, Saint Lucia, Samoa, and Somalia, were each selected through a casting process conducted by their respective organizations.) while six were selected to replace an original winner.

In September 2023, during the Tanner Fletcher show at New York Fashion Week, Miss Universe 2022, R'Bonney Gabriel confirmed that the Miss Universe Organization had removed age restrictions for contestants over the age of 18, which were introduced following the 2023 pageant. Before this, the pageant had restricted participation to women between ages 18–28 on the year of the pageant, outside of special circumstances. Also, height and weight restrictions were removed. (Note: Contestants over the age of 28 competed in recent editions of Miss Universe due to postponements, or after withdrawing from their scheduled edition for personal reasons and being invited to compete instead the following year.)

=== Replacements ===
Four candidates were replaced by their runners-up. Irina Zakharova of Armenia faced backlash from the Armenian public after being identified as a Russian national. Eventually, the Miss Universe Organization disqualified her, indicating that she had violated rules on the eligibility to participate. She was then replaced by Emma Avanesyan, one of her runners-up. Emma Heyst of Denmark withdrew due to inadequate preparation for the event and was replaced by Victoria Kjær Theilvig, who subsequently won the competition. Fay Asghari of Iran relinquished her crown due to conflict with her work, and was replaced by her first runner-up Ava Vahneshan. Andrea Radford of Guatemala relinquished her title after becoming pregnant. She was replaced by her first runner-up, Gabriela Villanueva.

Two candidates were replaced due to changes in franchise ownership. Karina Kiseleva of Belarus was selected to be the country's debut entry. However, she was replaced by Eleonora Kachalovskaya after she and her organization withdrew from the competition. Franki Russell of New Zealand was replaced by Victoria Velasquez Vincent after a change in ownership in the national franchise, citing non-compliance with guidelines set by the Miss Universe Organization.

=== Debuts, returns, and withdrawals ===
This edition marked the debuts of Belarus, Eritrea, Guinea, Iran, (Note: Competed as Persia in the pageant) Macau, the Maldives, Moldova, North Macedonia, Somalia, the United Arab Emirates, and Uzbekistan.

Additionally, this edition featured the returns of Cuba, which last competed in 1967; Fiji in 1981; Guadeloupe and Martinique in 1984; Côte d'Ivoire, the Democratic Republic of the Congo (as Zaire), and Samoa (as Western Samoa) in 1986; Senegal in 1987; Gibraltar in 1990; Bonaire and Suriname in 1999; Hong Kong in 2000; Cyprus in 2012; Botswana and Estonia in 2013; Turks and Caicos Islands in 2014; Montenegro and Serbia in 2015; Sri Lanka and Zambia in 2018; Bangladesh, New Zealand, Tanzania, and the United States Virgin Islands in 2019; Israel, Kenya, and Romania in 2021; and Armenia, Belize, China, Kyrgyzstan, Turkey, and Uruguay last competed in 2022.

Italy Mora of Panama was disqualified during the pageant due to leaving the hotel without consent from the Miss Universe Organization. This decision was made by the Disciplinary Committee of Miss Universe Organization jointly with their local franchise holder.

Prior to the preliminary competition, Edona Bajrami of Kosovo and Mia le Roux of South Africa withdrew for health reasons. Bahar Mirzayeva of Azerbaijan was supposed to compete, but did not show up in the host country.

== Pageant ==
=== Format ===
The number of semifinalists in this edition increased from twenty to thirty, marking the highest number of semifinalists in the history of the pageant. The preliminary competition, consisting of the swimsuit segment, evening gown and closed-door interviews, determined the semifinalists for the pageant. Four continental queens and one fan-vote winner automatically advanced to the semifinals. The initial group of semifinalists then competed in the swimsuit segment, from which twelve contestants progressed to the evening gown competition. Subsequently, five contestants advanced to the question-and-answer round, where the winner and her four runners-up were announced.

=== New crown ===
On 14 November, the pageant unveiled the "Lumière de l'Infini" (transl. "The Light of Infinity") as the 12th crown used in the history of the pageant. The crown, provided by Jewelmer, is adorned with diamonds and 23 golden south sea pearls. Created over the span of two years, the crown was crafted by Filipino craftsmen using traditional techniques from Place Vendôme.

The choice of material for the new crown, sourced from the Philippines, has garnered mixed reactions. An indigenous group from the region where the pearls were collected, the Sambilog-Balik Bugsuk Movement, issued an open letter to the eventual winner, Theilvig. The letter expressed concerns regarding the crown's connection to the experiences of Indigenous Peoples on Bugsuk Island and encouraged her to use her platform to raise awareness of the challenges faced by marginalized groups globally.

=== Selection committee ===
- Camila Guiribitey – Cuban philanthropist and entrepreneur
- Emilio Estefan – Cuban and American musician and producer
- Eva Cavalli – Austrian fashion designer and first runner-up at Miss Universe 1977
- Fariana – Colombian actress and singer
- Gabriela González – Mexican fashion designer
- Gary Nader – Lebanese and Dominican art collector
- Gianluca Vacchi – Italian entrepreneur, internet personality, and President of SEA Societa Europea Autocaravan
- Jessica Carrillo – Mexican news reporter at Telemundo
- Lele Pons – Venezuelan and American singer, actress, and YouTube personality
- Margaret Gardiner – Journalist and Miss Universe 1978 from South Africa
- Michael Cinco – Filipino fashion designer based in Dubai
- Nova Stevens – Advocate and Miss Universe Canada 2020

== Results ==
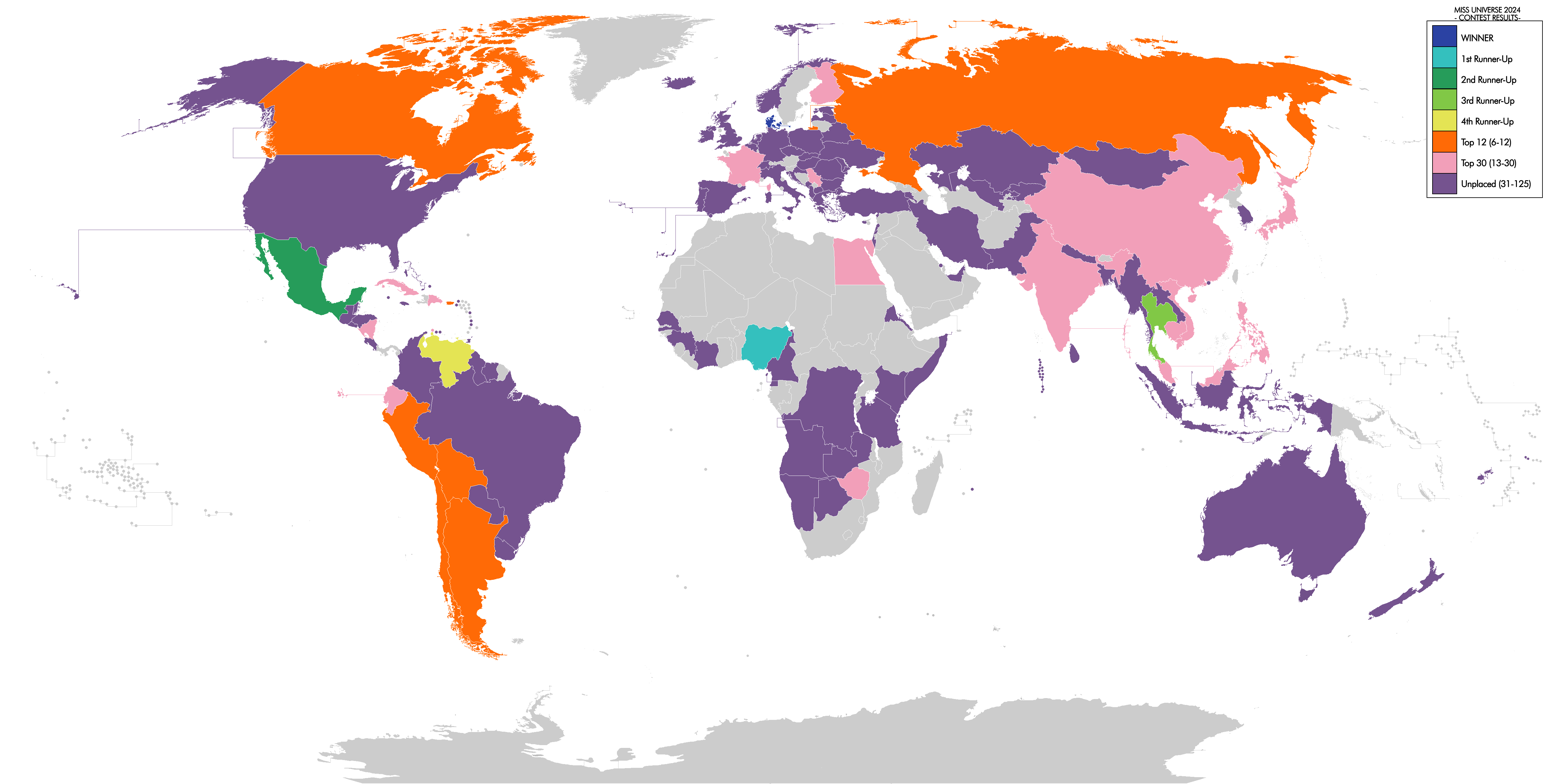
Miss universe 2024 participating countries and territories

=== Placements ===
Placement	Contestant
Miss Universe 2024	Denmark – Victoria Kjær Theilvig
1st Runner-Up	Nigeria – Chidimma Adetshina Δ
2nd Runner-Up	Mexico – Fernanda Beltrán
3rd Runner-Up	Thailand – Suchata Chuangsri (Note: the Miss Universe Organization announced her removal from the position of 3rd runner-up of Miss Universe 2024 due to not completing the full one-year term.)
4th Runner-Up	Venezuela – Ileana Márquez
Top 12	Argentina – Magalí Benejam; Bolivia – Juliana Barrientos; Canada – Ashley Callingbull; Chile – Emilia Dides §; Peru – Tatiana Calmell Δ; Puerto Rico – Jennifer Colón; Russia – Valentina Alekseeva
Top 30	Aruba – Anouk Eman; Cambodia – Davin Prasath; China – Qi Jia; Cuba – Marianela Ancheta; Dominican Republic – Celinee Santos; Ecuador – Mara Topić; Egypt – Logina Salah; Finland – Matilda Wirtavuori Δ; France – Indira Ampiot; India – Rhea Singha; Japan – Kaya Chakrabortty; Macau – Cassandra Chiu; Malaysia – Sandra Lim; Nicaragua – Geyssell García; Philippines – Chelsea Manalo Δ; Serbia – Ivana Trišić; Vietnam – Kỳ Duyên Nguyễn; Zimbabwe – Sakhile Dube

§ – Voted into the Top 30 by viewers

Δ – Placed into the Top 30 as a continental queen

=== Continental Queens ===
The Continental Queens were revealed at the press conference following the final competition. The winners were the ones who ranked the highest in their respective continents in the preliminary competition and was chosen regardless of their final placement in the competition.

Continental Group	Contestant
Africa & Oceania	Nigeria – Chidimma Adetshina
Asia	Philippines – Chelsea Manalo
Europe & Middle East	Finland – Matilda Wirtavuori
Americas	Peru – Tatiana Calmell

=== Special awards ===
After the preliminary competition, special awards were given to the national directors and contestants.

Award	Contestant
Best Skin Award	Honduras – Stephanie Cam
Miss Congeniality	Trinidad and Tobago – Jenelle Thongs
People's Choice Award	Chile - Emilia Dides

==== Organizational awards ====
Award	Recipient
Best National Director	Miss Universe Canada – Dennis Dávila
Best National Host Tour Country	Miss Universe Philippines – Jonas Gaffud
Best National Pageant	Miss Universe Vietnam – Nguyễn Thị Hương Ly
Beyond the Crown Award	Yizette Cifredo

==== Best National Costume ====
The Best in National Costume award was announced on their official social media platforms two weeks after the competition, based on votes in the Miss Universe app.

Placement	Contestant
Winner	Philippines – Chelsea Manalo
2nd Place	Chile – Emilia Dides
3rd Place	Vietnam – Kỳ Duyên Nguyễn

==== Voice for Change ====
The contestants participated in the Voice For Change competition, where they showcased their advocacy through a three-minute video. The competition was sponsored by jewelry brand Mouawad and communication platform CI Talks, and the winners were determined through an online vote and a selection committee. During the preliminary competition, the seven silver finalists were announced and the three gold winners were unveiled during the preliminary competition.

Placement	Contestant
Gold Winners	Bolivia – Juliana Barrientos; Cambodia – Davin Prasath; Guatemala – Gabriela Villanueva
Silver Finalists	Aruba – Anouk Eman; Bahrain – Shereen Ahmed; Cayman Islands – Raegan Rutty; Eritrea – Snit Tewoldemedhin; Finland – Matilda Wirtavuori; Guinea – Saran Bah; Thailand – Suchata Chuangsri

== Contestants ==
125 contestants competed for the title:

Country/Territory	Contestant	Age (Note: Ages at the time of the pageant)	Hometown
Albania	Françeska Rustem	19	Durrës
Angola	Nelma Ferreira	26	Benguela
Argentina	Magalí Benejam	29	Córdoba
Armenia	Emma Avanesyan	32	Yerevan
Aruba	Anouk Eman	32	Oranjestad
Australia	Zoe Creed	23	Brisbane
Bahamas	Selvinique Wright	32	Andros
Bahrain	Shereen Ahmed	30	Manama
Bangladesh	Aniqa Alam	32	Dhaka
Belarus	Eleonora Kachalovskaya	24	Minsk
Belgium	Kenza Ameloot	22	Sint-Amandsberg
Belize	Halima Hoy	30	Port Loyola
Bolivia	Juliana Barrientos	27	Cochabamba
Bonaire	Ruby Pouchet	29	Kralendijk
Botswana	Thanolo Keutlwile	28	Thamaga
Brazil	Luana Cavalcante	25	Recife
British Virgin Islands	Deyounce Lowenfield	20	Tortola
Bulgaria	Elena Vian	38	Haskovo
Cambodia	Davin Prasath	33	Phnom Penh
Cameroon	Noura Njikam	25	Yaoundé
Canada	Ashley Callingbull	35	Enoch
Cayman Islands	Raegan Rutty	22	East End
Chile	Emilia Dides	25	Vitacura
China	Qi Jia	26	Chengdu
Colombia	Daniela Toloza	30	Cali
Costa Rica	Elena Hidalgo	32	San José
Côte d'Ivoire	Marie Diamala	20	Aboisso
Croatia	Zrinka Ćorić	23	Dubrovnik
Cuba	Marianela Ancheta	31	Ranchuelo
Curaçao	Kimberly de Boer	19	Willemstad
Cyprus	Katerina Dimitriou	29	Nicosia
Czech Republic	Marie Danči	28	Krnov
Democratic Republic of the Congo (Note: Competed as DR Congo in the pageant)	Ilda Amani Dorcas	26	Bukavu
Denmark	Victoria Kjær Theilvig	21	Herlev
Dominican Republic	Celinee Santos	24	La Altagracia
Ecuador	Mara Topić	30	Guayaquil
Egypt	Logina Salah	34	Alexandria
El Salvador	Florence García	26	San Miguel
Equatorial Guinea	Diana Brichs	25	Malabo
Eritrea	Snit Tewoldemedhin	25	Asmara
Estonia	Valeria Vasilieva	22	Tallinn
Fiji	Manshika Prasad	24	Levuka
Finland	Matilda Wirtavuori	24	Tampere
France	Indira Ampiot	20	Basse-Terre
Germany	Pia Theissen	26	Cologne
Gibraltar	Shyanne McIntosh	25	Gibraltar
Great Britain	Christina Chalk	31	Dunblane
Greece	Christianna Katsieri	22	Piraeus
Guadeloupe	Coraly Desplan	20	Pointe-Noire
Guatemala	Gabriela Villanueva	22	Santa Cruz Naranjo
Guinea	Saran Bah	29	Conakry
Guyana	Ariana Blaize	26	Georgetown
Honduras	Stephanie Cam	32	San Pedro Sula
Hong Kong	Joanne Rhodes	24	Hong Kong
Hungary	Nóra Kenéz	28	Szombathely
Iceland	Sóldís Ívarsdóttir	18	Árbær
India	Rhea Singha	19	Ahmedabad
Indonesia	Clara Krebs	22	Tangerang
Iran	Ava Vahneshan	26	Mashhad
Ireland	Sofia Labus	21	Montenotte
Israel	Ofir Korsia	23	Rishon LeZion
Italy	Glelany Cavalcante	30	Civitanova Marche
Jamaica	Rachel Silvera	25	Saint Mary
Japan	Kaya Chakrabortty	23	Kobe
Kazakhstan	Madina Almukhanova	24	Almaty
Kenya	Irene Mukii	26	Juja
Kyrgyzstan	Maya Turdalieva	25	Bishkek
Laos	Phiranya Thipphomvong	28	Houaphanh
Latvia	Marija Vicinska	26	Riga
Lebanon	Nada Koussa	26	Rahbeh
Macau	Cassandra Chiu	23	Nossa Senhora do Carmo
Malaysia	Sandra Lim	23	Selangor
Maldives	Mariyam Shaina Naseem	21	Malé
Malta	Beatrice Njoya	40	Saint Paul's Bay
Martinique	Catherine Édouard	25	Fort-de-France
Mauritius	Tania René	27	Quatre-Bornes
Mexico	Fernanda Beltrán	24	Culiacan
Moldova	Djulieta Calalb	20	Chișinău
Mongolia	Nominzul Zandangiin	19	Ulaanbaatar
Montenegro	Rumina Ivezaj	20	Tuzi
Myanmar	Thet San Andersen	27	Yangon
Namibia	Prisca Anyolo	24	Windhoek
Nepal	Sampada Ghimire	23	Bhaktapur
Netherlands	Faith Landman	28	Zandvoort
New Zealand	Victoria Vincent	29	Auckland
Nicaragua	Geyssell García	29	Santo Tomás
Nigeria	Chidimma Adetshina	23	Taraba
North Macedonia	Tea Gjorgievska	21	Kumanovo
Norway	Lilly Sødal	21	Kristiansand
Pakistan	Noor Xarmina	29	Islamabad
Paraguay	Naomi Méndez	32	Asunción
Peru	Tatiana Calmell	30	Talara
Philippines	Chelsea Manalo	25	Meycauayan
Poland	Kasandra Zawal	29	Bierzglinek
Portugal	Andreia Correia	26	Sintra
Puerto Rico	Jennifer Colón	36	Orocovis
Romania	Loredana Salanță	32	Bistrița
Russia	Valentina Alekseeva	18	Cheboksary
Saint Lucia	Skye Faucher	26	Castries
Samoa	Haylani Kuruppu	26	Apia
Senegal	Fatou Bintou Guèye	24	Louga
Serbia	Ivana Trišić	30	Belgrade
Singapore	Charlotte Chia	26	Singapore
Slovakia	Petra Siváková	24	Šamorín
Somalia	Khadija Omar	23	Mogadishu
South Korea	Ariel Han	22	Seoul
Spain	Michelle Jiménez	21	Palma de Mallorca
Sri Lanka	Melloney Dassanayaka	25	Colombo
Suriname	Pooja Chotkan	23	Paramaribo
Switzerland	Laura Bircher	24	Stans
Tanzania	Judith Ngussa	26	Lindi
Thailand	Suchata Chuangsri	21	Phuket
Trinidad and Tobago	Jenelle Thongs	32	Morvant
Turkey (Note: The country has competed as Türkiye in the pageant since 2022, following the United Nations' official recognition of the name change in June 2022)	Ayliz Duman	20	Istanbul
Turks and Caicos Islands	Raynae Myers	23	Grand Turk
Ukraine	Alina Ponomarenko	21	Odesa
United Arab Emirates	Emilia Dobreva	27	Dubai
United States	Alma Cooper	22	Okemos
United States Virgin Islands	Stephany Andujar	28	Saint Thomas
Uruguay	Yanina Lucas	28	Lavalleja
Uzbekistan	Nigina Fakhriddinova	25	Navoiy
Venezuela	Ileana Márquez	28	Valencia
Vietnam	Kỳ Duyên Nguyễn	28	Nam Định
Zambia	Brandina Lubuli	28	Mufulira
Zimbabwe	Sakhile Dube	28	Bulawayo

== Reception ==
After the Miss Universe Organization allowed married women and women with children to compete starting in 2023, and confirmed in 2024 that age restrictions for contestants over 18 had been removed, this year's roster was widely praised for its diversity and inclusivity, especially in comparison to past editions. Miss Universe 2024 saw a significant increase in diversity, with contestants of various ages and backgrounds, including mothers, a married woman, and the oldest contestant at 40. By eliminating the upper age limit, the pageant has now opened its doors to women of all ages. Among the contestants in this edition were Ashley Callingbull of Canada, the first Indigenous Canadian contestant in Miss Universe, Logina Salah of Egypt, the first woman with vitiligo, Shyanne McIntosh of Gibraltar, the shortest contestant in Miss Universe history, and Khadija Omar of Somalia, the first hijabi woman to compete in Miss Universe.

Furthermore, the edition also saw the participation of married women and mothers to compete in the pageant, with participation of Emma Avanesyan of Armenia, Aniqa Alam of Bangladesh, Luana Cavalcante of Brazil, Elena Vian of Bulgaria, Davin Prasath of Cambodia, Ashley Callingbull of Canada, Elena Hidalgo of Costa Rica, Logina Salah of Egypt, Diana Brichs of Equatorial Guinea, Stephanie Cam of Honduras, Beatrice Njoya of Malta, Faith Landman of the Netherlands, Chidimma Adetshina of Nigeria, Jennifer Colón of Puerto Rico, Loredana Salanță of Romania, Judith Ngussa of Tanzania, Emilia Dobreva of the United Arab Emirates, Ileana Márquez of Venezuela, and Brandina Lubuli of Zambia.
