= Miss Bonaire =

Beauty contest

Miss Bonaire Organization
- Formation: 1967
- Purpose: Beauty pageant
- Headquarters: Kralendijk
- Location: Bonaire
- Official language: Dutch
- National Director: Roderick Beaumont (Miss Bonaire); Bonaire Top International Org. (Miss International Bonaire)
- Affiliations: Miss Universe
- Website: Official website

Miss Bonaire is a national beauty pageant in Bonaire.

== History ==
Traditionally, Miss Bonaire sent its winners to Miss Universe from 1967 to 1999. From 1973 to 1983, the winner of the Miss Bonaire pageant competed at Miss Intercontinental. Since the 2000s, the municipality has not competed at any international pageants. In 2010, the municipality declared to return to the international pageants.

In 2023, the 2022 Miss Bonaire, Ruby Pouchet, was sent to compete in Miss Grand International.

== Titleholders ==
Color key

- Declared the winner
- Finished as runner-up
- Finished as a finalist or semifinalist

The main winner of Miss Bonaire represents Angola at Miss Universe pageant. On occasion, when the winner does not qualify (due to age) for either contest, a runner-up is sent.

| Year | Miss Bonaire | International pageants | Placement | Special awards | Notes |
|---|---|---|---|---|---|
| 1967 | Cristina Landwier | Miss Universe 1967 | Unplaced | | |
| 1968 | Ilse Maria de Jong | Miss Universe 1968 | Unplaced | | |
| 1969 | Julia Edviga Nicolaas | Miss Universe 1969 | Unplaced | | |
| 1973 | Els Marie Beukenboom | Miss Teenage Peace International 1973 | Top 7 | | Miss Teenage Peace International is "Now" called as the Miss Intercontinental. |
| 1974 | Jasmin Romondt | Miss Teenage Intercontinental 1974 | Unplaced | | Miss Teen Intercontinental is "Now" called as the Miss Intercontinental |
| 1975 | Judith Antonia Evertsz | Miss Teenage Intercontinental 1975 | Unplaced | | |
| 1978 | Rosseley Hernandez | Miss Universe 1978; Miss Teenage Intercontinental 1978 | Unplaced | | |
| 1983 | Susan Angela | Miss Turismo del Caribe 1985; Miss Intercontinental 1983 | Unplaced | | |
| 1995 | Donna Landwier | Miss Universe 1995 | Unplaced | | |
| 1996 | Jessy Viceisza | Miss Universe 1996 | Unplaced | | |
| 1997 | Jhane-Louise Landwier | Miss Universe 1997; Miss World 1996 | Unplaced | | Previously won Miss World Bonaire 1996 |
| 1998 | Uzmin Mariluz Everts | Miss Universe 1998 | Unplaced | | |
| 1999 | Julina Felida | Miss Universe 1999; Top Model of the World 1999 | Unplaced | Assumed as the People's Choice Award by website only for Miss Universe 1999 | |
| 2010 | Benazir Berends Charles | Miss World 2011; Miss Intercontinental 2010 | Top 15 at Miss Intercontinental 2010 | | In 2010 the Netherlands proclaimed that Bonaire is being Municipality of the Netherlands. The Miss Universe confirmed that Bonaire is only allowed to compete at Miss Nederland and will not go to Miss Universe anymore. |
| 2012 | Saphira Elouise Janga | Miss Intercontinental 2012 | Unplaced | | Withdrew at Miss World and Ana Gisel Maciel took over to be the new Miss World Bonaire 2012 |
| 2014 | Michelle Gumbs | Miss Intercontinental 2014 | Unplaced | | Withdrew at Miss Intercontinental 2014 and Skye Romeijn took over to be the new Miss Intercontinental Bonaire 2014/2015 |
| 2018 | Ruthgainy Frans | None | | | Did not compete at international pageants. |
| 2019 | Vera Ghazzouli (Miss Bonaire International) | Miss International 2019 | Did not compete | | In 2019, the Bonaire Top International Organization franchised the Miss International license for Bonaire. |
| 2023 | Ruby Pouchet | Miss Universe 2024; Miss Grand International 2023 | Unplaced | | In 2024, the Miss Universe Organization introduced a new regulation allowing any territory to return to the competition, provided they hold a Miss Universe license. Bonaire was officially approved to return after many years and competed as a Dutch territory at Miss Universe 2024 in Mexico. |
| 2024 | Angie Daza | None | | | |
| 2025 | Nicole Peiliker-Visser | Miss Universe 2025 | Unplaced | | The first mother who won Miss Bonaire. |
| 2026 | Caroline Porras | Miss Universe 2026 | TBA | | |
