= Lainey Floeck =

Panamian beauty pageant titleholder

- Born: 2001 (age 24–25); Chiriquí, Panama
- Occupation: Model
- Beauty pageant titleholder
- Title: Miss Cosmo Panamá 2026
- Agency: The Source Models; Zombie Model Management
- Major competitions: Miss Cosmo Panamá 2026; (Winner); Miss Cosmo 2026; (TBD)

Lainey Marie Floeck Looney is a Panamanian model and beauty pageant titleholder who was crowned Miss Cosmo Panamá 2026. She will represent Panama at Miss Cosmo 2026 in Vietnam.

== Early life ==
Floeck is a Panamanian from Chiriquí Province with a background in both Panama and the United States.

== Pageantry ==
=== Miss Cosmo Panamá 2026 ===
On September 25, 2026, Floeck was crowned Miss Cosmo Panamá 2026 at The Venue at Soho, Panama City. She was subsequently honored with a ceremonial event attended by Yolina Lindquist.

=== Miss Cosmo 2026 ===
She is scheduled to represent Panama at Miss Cosmo 2026, which will be held on January 16, 2027, in Khánh Hòa, Vietnam.

Awards and achievements
Preceded by Italy Mora	Miss Cosmo Panamá; 2026	Incumbent
