= Ruby Pouchet =

Dutch beauty pageant titleholder

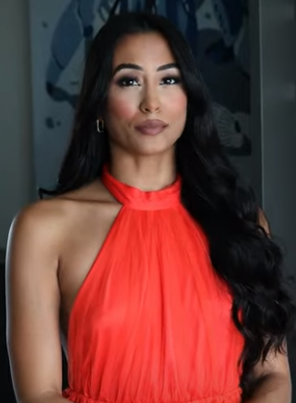
- Born: Ruby Pouchet; 1995 or 1996 (age 29–30); Kralendijk, Bonaire
- Beauty pageant titleholder
- Title: Miss Bonaire 2022; Miss Grand Bonaire 2023; Miss Universe Bonaire 2024
- Major competitions: Miss Bonaire 2022 (Winner); Miss Grand International 2023 (Unplaced); Miss Universe 2024 (Unplaced)

Ruby Pouchet is Dutch beauty pageant titleholder from Bonaire. Pouchet represented Playa Pariba at Miss Bonaire 2022 where she was crowned Miss Bonaire 2022 at the finale. Her court included Caroline Porras of Antriol and Michell Emerenciana of Kralendijk. She also was crowned Miss Universe Bonaire 2024 and represented her country at Miss Universe 2024.

== Personal life ==
Ruby Pouchet was born in 1995 or 1996 (age 29–30) in Kralendijk, Bonaire. She obtained a bachelor's degree in advertising from the University of Houston in 2019, and has since worked as a community and content coordinator for the environmental non-governmental organization, STINAPA Bonaire.

== Pageantry ==
Ruby represented Playa Pariba and won Miss Bonaire 2022. In 2023, she was announced as the first Miss Grand Bonaire. Pouchet later represented Bonaire at Miss Grand International 2023, held at Ho Chi Minh City, Vietnam, in late 2023, but was unplaced. She later participated in Miss Universe 2024 but was also unplaced.

Awards and achievements
Preceded by Ruthgainy Frans	Miss Bonaire; 2022	Succeeded by Angie Daza
Preceded by None	Miss Grand Bonaire; 2023	Succeeded by Incumbent
Preceded by Julina Felida	Miss Universe Bonaire; 2024	Succeeded by Nicole Peiliker-Visser
