= Khadija Omar =

Somali beauty pageant titleholder (born 1999)

- Omar in 2024
- Born: 21 March 2001 (age 25); Nairobi, Kenya
- Education: University of Toronto
- Height: 168 cm (5 ft 6 in)
- Beauty pageant titleholder
- Major competitions: Miss World 2021; (Top 13); Miss Universe Canada 2024; (3rd Runner-up); Miss Universe 2024; (Unplaced); Miss Cosmo 2026; (TBD)

Khadija Omar (born 21 March 2001) is a Somali entrepreneur, makeup artist, model and beauty pageant titleholder. She was the first Somali woman to participate in and reach the Top 13 at Miss World 2021, and subsequently represented her country at Miss Universe 2024 and Miss Cosmo 2026.

== Early life ==
Khadija Omar was born on March 21, 2001, at the Hagadera Refugee Camp in Kenya. At the age of ten, she and her family immigrated to Canada to settle there. In 2020, she enrolled at the University of Toronto to pursue a bachelor's degree in psychology. She is expected to graduate in 2024.

She also collaborated with United Nations High Commissioner for Refugees and Somali Youth Action to create livelihood and climate education programs specifically for women and children, and to help relocate vulnerable people from flood-prone areas. She made an impression as the first Hijab-wearing contestant to represent Somalia in beauty pageants.

== Pageantry ==
She was appointed Miss World Somalia 2021 and became Somalia's first representative at Miss World. She finished in the Top 13 at the Miss World 2021.

She was named 3rd Runner-up at the Miss Universe Canada 2024 pageant on July 27, 2024, in Windsor, Ontario.

She is officially representing the country at Miss Universe 2024 and Miss Cosmo 2026.
