= Stephanie Cam =

Honduran/Peruvian model and beauty queen

- Modeling information
- Height: 176.5 cm (5 ft 9.5 in)
- Hair color: Auburn red hair
- Eye color: Brown

Stephanie Cam is an American model and beauty pageant titleholder. she was crowned Miss Universe Honduras 2024 and received the Best Skin award at the Miss Universe pageant.

== Early life and education ==
Cam was born to Honduran and Peruvian parents and raised in Queens, New York City.

== Career ==
=== Modeling ===
Cam has modeled for over a decade, during which she has been on the covers of publications such as Vogue Portugal and appeared in editorials for Elle, Vogue Girl, and Cake Magazine.

=== Pageantry ===
In 2024, Cam was crowned Miss Universe Honduras on August 22 at the Centro de Convenciones Copantl in San Pedro Sula. At 32, she became the first mother to hold this title. She went on to represent Honduras at the 73rd Miss Universe pageant in Mexico, where she was honored with the Best Skin Award.

== Personal life ==
Cam has a daughter.
