= Miss Guinea =

African beauty pageant

d'Organisation Miss Guinée (COOMISGUI)
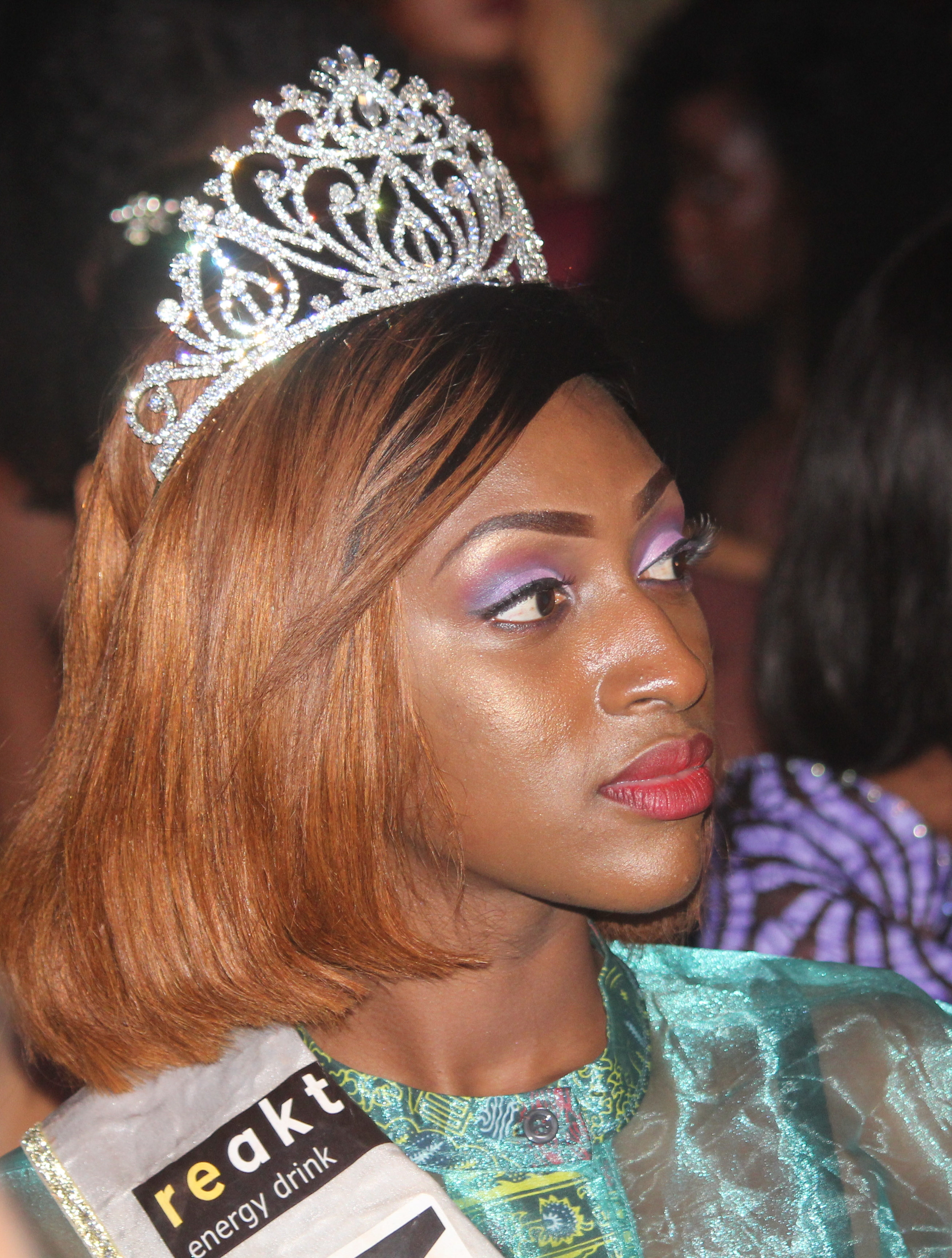
- Miss Guinea in 2019
- Formation: 1986; 40 years ago
- Type: Beauty pageant
- Headquarters: Conakry
- Location: Guinea
- Members: Miss Universe; Miss Cosmo
- Official language: English
- Chairwoman: Aminata Diallo

Miss Guinea is a beauty pageant and organization that selects Guinea's official representative for Miss Universe. The reigning Miss Guinea 2025 is Matôma Condé of Conakry.

== History ==
Miss Guinea is a beauty contest for Guinean women aged 18 to 25 who are at least 1.70 meters tall. The winner is awarded the annual title of Miss Guinea. The contest was first created in 1986, but it was suspended in 1987, only to be revived in 2008. It was again suspended for two years in 2017 and 2018. Each edition of the contest is broadcast on television.

The final, held during a national ceremony and broadcast live on television in the evening, involves a jury composed of artistic, sports, or media personalities, along with votes from viewers, to elect the selected candidate. The winner will hold the title of "Miss Guinea" for an entire year. The candidates are the "Regional Misses," chosen to represent the regions of Guinea and other competitions.

Beginning 2023 Aminata Diallo and team from KPAAF Guinée organized the Miss Guinea beauty pageant and in 2024, the winner of the title is expected to compete at Miss Universe 2024 pageant.

== Formats ==
The Miss Guinea competition is traditionally holding region representation every year. All delegates across Guinea will compete for the crown. In the finale result there will be Second Runner-up, First Runner-up, then finally Miss Guinea (Guinee) winner.

- Miss Boké
- Miss Conakry
- Miss Faranah
- Miss Kankan
- Miss Kindia
- Miss Labé
- Miss Mamou
- Miss Nzérékoré

== Directorships ==
  - Miss Universe (2024―present)
  - Miss Cosmo (2024―present)
  - Miss ECOWAS (2024―present)
  - Miss Elite (2024―present)

Number of wins under Miss Guinea
Pageant	Wins
Miss Universe	0
Miss Cosmo	0
Miss ECOWAS	0
Miss Elite	0

== Titleholders ==
Year	Miss Guinea	Region
1987	Hadja Kadiatou Seth Conté	Conakry
2008	Hann Fatoumata	Conakry
2009	Ary Sidibe	Kankan
2010	Fatoumata Kande	Conakry
2011	Salematou Keita	Conakry
2012	Koulako Kaba	Conakry
2014	Halimatou Diallo	Conakry
2015	Mama Aïssata Diallo	Conakry
2016	Safiatou Balde	Conakry
2017	Asmaou Diallo	Conakry
2019	Mariame Touré	Conakry
2023	Saran Kourouma	Conakry
2024	Tiguidanké Bérété	Conakry
2025	Matôma Condé	Conakry

=== Wins by region ===
Region	Titles	Years
Conakry	12	1987, 2008, 2010, 2011, 2012, 2014, 2015, 2016, 2017, 2019, 2023, 2024, 2025
Kankan	1	2009

== Titleholders under Miss Guinee committee ==
=== Miss Universe Guinea ===
Color key

- : Declared as Winner
- : Ended as runner-up
- : Ended as one of the finalists or semi-finalists
- : Ended as Special awards winner

Year	Region	Miss Universe Guinea	Placement at Miss Universe	Special awards	Notes
Aminata Diallo directorship — a franchise holder to Miss Universe from 2024
2026	Conakry	Justine Kamara	TBA		Justine was the 4th runner-up of Miss France 2017
2025	Conakry	Tiguidanké Bérété	Unplaced		
2024	Conakry	Saran Bah	Unplaced	Voice for Change (Silver Finalist)	

=== Miss Cosmo Guinea ===
Color key

- : Declared as Winner
- : Ended as runner-up
- : Ended as one of the finalists or semi-finalists
- : Ended as Special awards winner

Year	Region	Miss Cosmo Guinea	Placement at Miss Cosmo	Special awards	Notes
Aminata Diallo directorship — a franchise holder to Miss Cosmo from 2024
2026	Conakry	Matôma Condé	TBA		
2025	Did not compete				
2024	Conakry	Saran Kourouma	Unplaced		

== See also ==
- Miss Universe
