= Avani Kakekochhi =

Indian model, dancer and beauty pageant titleholder (born 1999)

- Born: Avani Kakekochhi Bhat; 1999 (age 26–27); Bengaluru, India
- Occupations: Model, dancer
- Height: 1.68 m (5 ft 6 in)
- Beauty pageant titleholder
- Title: Miss Diva Cosmo 2025
- Hair color: Brown
- Eye color: Brown
- Major competitions: Miss Diva 2025; (Winner – Miss Diva Cosmo); Miss Cosmo 2026; (TBA)

Avani Kakekochhi Bhat is an Indian aerospace engineer, model, Bharatanatyam dancer and beauty pageant titleholder. She won the title of Miss Diva Cosmo 2025 at Miss Diva 2025, held on 21 December 2025 in Mumbai. She will representing India at Miss Cosmo 2026.

== Early life ==
Kakekochhi was born in 1999 in Bengaluru. She is an aerospace engineer, entrepreneur, and Bharatanatyam dancer. She received a National Scholarship from the Ministry of Culture and has performed at the G20 Summit.

She founded the Trayee School of Fine Arts with the aspiration of mentoring students across generations and preserving classical traditions.

== Pageant ==
=== Miss Diva 2025 ===
On 21 December 2025, at the Miss Diva 2025 final, she won the title of Miss Diva Cosmo 2025.

=== Miss Cosmo 2026 ===
She will represent India at Miss Cosmo 2026, which will take place in Vietnam on 16 January 2027.

She won the first sub-challenge, titled "Bare Face, Real Beauty," as part of The Cosmo CEO Challenge, securing the highest number of audience votes alongside the representative for Miss Cosmo Canada 2026.

Awards and achievements
Preceded by Vipra Mehta	Miss Diva Cosmo; 2025	Incumbent
