= Miss Universe UAE =

Beauty pageants in the United Arab Emirates

- Formation: 2024
- Type: Beauty pageant
- Headquarters: Dubai
- Location: United Arab Emirates
- Members: Miss Universe
- Official languages: English and Arabic
- National director: Poppy Capella

Miss Universe UAE is a national beauty pageant that is to select the representative of the United Arab Emirates for the Miss Universe competition.

== History ==
Miss Universe UAE was officially announced in September 2024, during a press conference in Dubai. The competition was held in 2024, with its winner making the nation's debut at the Miss Universe 2024 competition. Miss Universe UAE won't have a swimsuit competition, due to extremely strict local traditions based on Islamic Sharia laws; instead incorporates a fashion couture round.

Applications were open to all residents of the United Arab Emirates, rather than solely citizens. On September 8, 2024, a new team took over the license led by former Miss Universe Indonesia national director Poppy Capella.

Mariam Mohamed made history as the first representative from the UAE to compete in the Miss Universe beauty pageant in 2025, held in Thailand. At 26 years old, Mariam Mohamed holds a bachelor’s degree in economics from the University of Sydney and is currently studying fashion design at ESMOD Dubai. Beyond her work in fashion, Mariam is also involved in charitable and social initiatives and has represented the UAE in international women’s entrepreneurship programs.

== Titleholders ==
- : Declared the winner
- : Finished as a runner-up or top 5/6 qualification
- : Finished as one of the finalists or semifinalists
- : Finished as a special awards winner

Year	Emirate	Miss UAE	Placement at Miss Universe	Special Award(s)
Poppy Capella directorship — a franchise holder to Miss Universe from 2024
Did not compete in 2026
2025	Dubai	Mariam Mohamed	Unplaced	
2024	Dubai	Emilia Dobreva	Unplaced	
