= Franki Russell =

New Zealand actress and beauty pageant titleholder

- Born: Frances Margaret Grant Russell; 24 July 1994 (age 32); Dunedin, New Zealand
- Occupations: Actress; model; reality television personality
- Beauty pageant titleholder
- Title: Miss Cosmo New Zealand 2024
- Major competitions: Miss Universe UAE 2021; (Top 30); Miss Cosmo 2024; (Top 21); (Best National Costume)

Frances Russell (born 24 July 1994) is a Filipina–New Zealand actress and beauty pageant contestant, who was appointed Miss Cosmo New Zealand 2024 and represented New Zealand at Miss Cosmo 2024.

Russell was appointed Miss Universe New Zealand 2024 and was to compete at Miss Universe 2024, but due to controversies of her career in acting and the cancellation of the Miss Universe New Zealand franchise, her title was removed.

In 2019, Russell moved to the Philippines to pursue a professional modelling career, and appeared as a housemate on Filipino reality television show, Pinoy Big Brother. She began acting in 2022, when she appeared in Ang Probinsyano. She was among the top 30 finalists in the Miss Universe United Arab Emirates 2021.

== Early life ==
Russell was born and raised in Dunedin, New Zealand, to a New Zealand father and a Filipina mother. At 18, she moved to Sydney, and later to Philippines in 2019, to pursue her career in acting and modeling.

== Pageantry ==
On 14 October 2021, Russell participated in Miss Universe United Arab Emirates, and reached the top 30 before the cancellation of the contest.

On 21 March 2024, Russell was appointed Miss Universe New Zealand. She was expected to represent New Zealand in the Miss Universe 2024 at Mexico, however due to her controversial acting career and the cancellation of the Miss Universe New Zealand franchise with Yugen PR (who owned the franchise) as a result of "the team's non-compliance with a specific order from the Miss Universe Organization", Russell was stripped from her title. According to her interview with Boy Abunda, Russell believed the reason for the cancellation of the franchise was due to the "racy" nature of her films and the Miss Universe New Zealand franchise holders' refusal to strip her from her title.

On 30 August 2024, the Miss Cosmo Organization released a post revealing that Russell was appointed as the New Zealand representative in Miss Cosmo 2024, in its inaugural pageant.

Awards and achievements
| Preceded by None | Best in National Costume; 2024 | Succeeded by (Nigeria) Tofunmi Adekola |
| Preceded by None | Miss Cosmo New Zealand; 2024 | Succeeded by Katharina Weischede |
