= Leonora Lysglimt-Rødland =

Norwegian beauty queen and fashion designer

- Born: Leonora Lysglimt-Rødland; June 23, 2006 (age 20); Oslo, Norway
- Education: Oslo Commerce School
- Occupation: Model
- Height: 173 cm (5 ft 8 in)
- Beauty pageant titleholder
- Title: Miss Norway 2025
- Major competitions: Miss Norway 2025; (Winner); Miss Universe 2025; (Unplaced); Miss Cosmo 2026; (TBD)

Leonora Lysglimt-Rødland (born June 23, 2006) is a Norwegian model, public figure, baton twirler, and beauty pageant titleholder. She won Miss Norway 2025 and represented Norway at Miss Universe 2025. She is set to compete in Miss Cosmo 2026.

== Early life ==
Leonora Lysglimt-Rødland was born and raised in the Nordstrand borough of Oslo, Norway. She lives in a coastal area near the Oslo Fjord.

She attended Oslo Commerce School and has participated since the age of seven as a baton twirler—an artistic sport combining elements of dance, physical coordination, and acrobatics. In addition, she engages in public health advocacy to raise awareness about hereditary hemorrhagic telangiectasia (HHT), a rare genetic disorder that also affects members of her family.

== Career ==
She has competed in events organized by the International Baton Twirling Federation (IBTF). Together with Emilie Bovim, she performed a duet at the 2023 Nations Cup in Liverpool, where they placed fifth out of 44 entries.

In 2025, she participated in the IBTF Majorette World Championship and Nations Cup in Turin as a member of the Norwegian national team. The team won the gold medal in the Senior B Team Twirl category. She has also worked as a coach for younger athletes.

In October 2025, she attended the 15th Manhattan Film Festival in New York. At the event, she wore a dress made from sustainable Manila hemp by Filipino designer Mayeth Sigue Codoy and received the Young Achievement Award.

She also participated in a project involving PC-hjelpen and NUUG to collect and prepare computers for students in Ukraine.

== Pageant ==
=== Miss Norway 2025 ===
She competed in the national Miss Norway beauty pageant for the first time in 2025. At the final, she was crowned Miss Universe Norway 2025 in August 2025 at the age of 18.

In 2025, she attended public events in her capacity as Miss Norway, including the Miss Denmark 2025 finals in Copenhagen and visits to the Thailand and Philippines embassies in Oslo.

=== Miss Universe 2025 ===
She competed in the Miss Universe 2025 pageant, held in Pak Kret, Thailand, in November 2025. She garnered global attention during the preliminary round by wearing a national costume that served as an artistic interpretation of salmon—one of Norway's key exports and a symbol of its maritime heritage.

At Miss Universe 2025, she wore a national costume inspired by salmon. The outfit reflects Norway's coastal culture and salmon industry, featuring details resembling scales, fins, and a stylized salmon head. The outfit attracted the attention of the media outside Norway. The New York Times reported on the outfit, and Norwegian media outlets—including Dagbladet, Se og Hør, and MinMote—also covered the reaction to it.

Other sources, including SalmonBusiness, Undercurrent News, and The Norwegian American, also reported on the outfit and its connection to the Norwegian salmon industry.

=== Miss Cosmo 2026 ===
She has been appointed as the first Miss Cosmo Norway to compete in Miss Cosmo 2026, which will take place in Vietnam in January 2027.

Awards and achievements
Preceded by Lilly Sødal	Miss Norway; 2025	Succeeded by Abelone Smedsrud
