= Jewelmer =

Jewellery manufacturer in the Philippines

- Company type: Private
- Industry: Luxury jewelry
- Founded: 1979
- Founder: Jacques Branellec; Manuel Cojuangco
- Headquarters: Makati, Philippines

Jewelmer is a jewelry brand from the Philippines, established in 1979 by Jacques Branellec and Manuel Cojuangco. The company specializes in jewelry made with South Sea Pearls. Since 2022, Jewelmer has collaborated with the Miss Universe Philippines beauty pageant, designing the La Mer en Majesté crown for the winners. In 2024, they introduced the "Lumière de l'Infini" (transl. "The Light of -Infinity") crown for the Miss Universe 2024 competition.

== History ==
Jewelmer was founded in 1979 by French pearl farmer Jacques Branellec and Filipino businessman Manuel Cojuangco. Before starting Jewelmer, Branellec served in the French Navy, worked as a commercial pilot, and farmed black Tahitian pearls in French Polynesia. Together, they established a pearl farm in Palawan, which became the foundation of their company.

In 2006, Jewelmer launched the Save Palawan Seas Foundation (SPSF) to support environmental conservation and introduce sustainable livelihood options for communities in Palawan.

The company has participated in international events like the Baselworld Watch and Jewelry Show and the Dubai Pearl Tender. Since 2013, Jewelmer has also hosted the Jewelmer Gala.

In 2017, Jewelmer introduced the Palawan Strand, a rare necklace of golden South Sea pearls from the Pinctada maxima oyster, which took 37 years to create. That same year, Jewelmer designed the headpiece for Miss Universe Philippines, Maxine Medina, at the 65th Miss Universe pageant.

In 2018, Jewelmer received the Sustainability Initiative of the Year Award at the Jewellery News Asia Awards in Hong Kong. In the same year, they opened its first U.S. store in Palm Beach, Florida. The company was also featured in the documentary Power of Pearl: The Farm Beneath the Sea, directed by Ahbra Cale Perry.

In 2022, Jewelmer created the "Pearl of the Orient" exhibit, showcased at The Mind Museum, and provided the La Mer en Majesté crown for the Miss Universe Philippines pageant, worn by winner Celeste Cortesi. The crown was used again in the 2023 pageant.

In 2023, model Aliah Canillas appeared on the cover of Vogue Philippines wearing a Jewelmer strand, and in May 2024, Jewelmer opened a boutique at Nustar Resort Cebu's The Mall in the Philippines.

In 2023, model Aliah Canillas wore a Jewelmer strand on the cover of the July 2023 issue of Vogue Philippines.

== The process ==
Jewelmer cultivates golden pearls and creates jewelry from them. Some designs are crafted by artisans trained in techniques from Place Vendôme, Paris. The company's pearl farms are situated in a marine-protected, no-take zone.
