= Michelle Jiménez =

Spanish model and beauty pageant queen

- Born: Adriana Michelle Jiménez; December 11, 2002 (age 23); Barcelona, Catalonia
- Education: Commerce Course and Certificate in Public Speaking and Ceremonies at the Dominican School of Oral Communication (EDOCO)
- Height: 1.66 m (5 ft 5 in)
- Beauty pageant titleholder
- Title: Miss Universe Spain 2024 and Miss cosmo dominican republic 2026
- Hair colour: Black
- Major competitions: Miss Universe Spain 2024; (Winner); Miss Universe 2024; (Unplaced); Miss Cosmo Dominican Republic 2026; (Winner)

Adriana Michelle Jiménez (born December 11, 2002) is a model and beauty queen of Dominican-Ecuadorian descent, who won the Miss Universe Spain 2024 beauty pageant and miss cosmo dominican republic 2026

== Background ==
Michelle Jiménez was born in Barcelona to a father of Dominican descent and an Ecuadorian mother, and grew up in the Balearic Islands. From a young age, he faced significant challenges within his family; at the age of 12, he left home due to circumstances that were not conducive to his development and was subsequently raised in a number of foster homes. These childhood experiences, including living in three different care centers, became an important part of his life story and motivation.

Michelle is the eldest of nine siblings, and her relationship with her grandparents, especially her grandmother, is mentioned as having been an important source of emotional support during that difficult time.

Before focusing on the world of beauty pageants, Michelle was active as a dancer and pole dance instructor, and built a career as a model since her teenage years. She is also known to be active on social media and has traveled to various countries such as Italy, France, and the Dominican Republic.

== Beauty pageant ==
Michelle Jiménez began her national beauty pageant journey with various local titles. She was Miss Universo Barcelona 2024 and first runner-up in Miss Universo Cataluña 2024 before being crowned Miss Universo Illes Balears 2024.

On September 11, 2024, Michelle was crowned Miss Universe Spain 2024 in Guía de Isora, Tenerife, beating 16 other contestants to win the national title and the right to represent Spain in the Miss Universe 2024 competition at Mexico City.

In the Miss Universe 2024 pageant, she competed alongside more than 120 delegates from around the world, but did not make it to the finals. After her reign, on July 30, 2025, Michelle handed over the crown to her successor, Andrea Valero.

Awards and achievements
Preceded by Athenea Pérez	Miss Universe Spain; 2024	Succeeded by Andrea Valero
Preceded by Nahla Kai	Miss Universo Baleares; 2024	Succeeded by Idayra Borges Tena
