= Dalia Varde =

Filipino-Egyptian actress and model (born 2003)

- Varde in 2025
- Born: Dalia Varde Khattab; Kuwait City, Kuwait
- Education: De Montfort University; Southville International School affiliated with Foreign Universities
- Beauty pageant titleholder
- Title: Miss Cosmo Egypt 2026
- Major competitions: Binibining Pilipinas 2025; (1st Runner-Up); Miss Cosmo 2026; (TBD)

Dalia Varde Khattab is a Filipino and Egyptian actress, model, and beauty pageant titleholder who was appointed Miss Cosmo Egypt 2026. She will represent Egypt at Miss Cosmo 2026. She previously finished as the first runner-up at Binibining Pilipinas 2025.

== Early life ==
Dalia Varde was born in Kuwait to an Egyptian father and a Filipino mother. She holds dual citizenship, having moved to the Philippines at the age of 14 to pursue an acting career. She is fluent in both English and Arabic.

Varde graduated from Southville International School affiliated with Foreign Universities and studies business at De Montfort University.

== Pageantry ==
=== Binibining Pilipinas 2025 ===
Varde made her beauty pageant debut after winning a provincial competition and representing Las Piñas at Binibining Pilipinas 2025, where she was named first runner-up in the finals.

=== Miss Cosmo 2026 ===
In September 2026, Miss Cosmo Egypt appointed Varde as its national titleholder for Miss Cosmo 2026.

Awards and achievements
Preceded by Nourhan Al Hossini	Miss Cosmo Egypt; 2026	Incumbent
