= Emilia Dobreva =

Kosovo-born model representing the UAE at Miss Universe 2024

- Born: Pristina, Kosovo
- Occupation: Model
- Known for: Representing the UAE in Miss Universe 2024
- Children: 3

Emilia Dobreva is a Kosovo-born model, television personality, and beauty pageant titleholder who was the first representative of United Arab Emirates in the Miss Universe pageant, competing in the 2024 edition held in Mexico City.

== Early life and education ==
Emilia was born in Pristina, Kosovo. She spent her early childhood in Kosovo before relocating to the UAE with her family.

== Career ==
Emilia began her modeling career with commercial work and runway appearances at the age of 12. By the age of 16, she had walked at events such as New York Fashion Week. Over the years, she has participated in a number of international fashion events, including Dubai Fashion Week, Riyadh Fashion Week, and Milan Fashion Week.

In 2015, Emilia won the title of Miss Model of the World, followed by "Miss Friendship International" in 2019 and 2020, along with the "Miss Talent Winner" title in Chengdu, China.

=== Miss Universe UAE ===
Emilia was crowned Miss Universe UAE in October 2024, following a competitive selection process overseen by the pageant's national director, Poppy Capella. The event marked the UAE's debut in the Miss Universe competition.

== See also ==
- Miss Universe
- United Arab Emirates
- Kosovo diaspora
