= Mariyam Shaina Naseem =

Maldivian beauty pageant titleholder

- މަރިޔަމް ޝައިނާ ނަސީމް
- Born: Malé, Maldives

Mariyam Shaina Naseem (Dhivehi: މަރިޔަމް ޝައިނާ ނަސީމް) is a Maldivian beauty pageant titleholder who won Miss Maldives 2024, and was the first Maldivian to represented her country at Miss Universe 2024.

Naseem won the Top Model Maldives 2022 and participated in the Top Model of the World and got 'New Face Award'.

== Career ==
Naseem won Top Model Maldives 2022, while participating in Top Model of the World. She also received the New Face Award and reached the top fifteen.

=== Controversy ===
In 2024, Naseem entered Miss Universe 2024 through her management company, He n She Maldives. This was without the backing by the Maldivian government, after she was condemned by the Maldives' Ministry of Youth Empowerment, Information and Arts, and local Islamic scholars.
