= Werner Wiskari =

American journalist

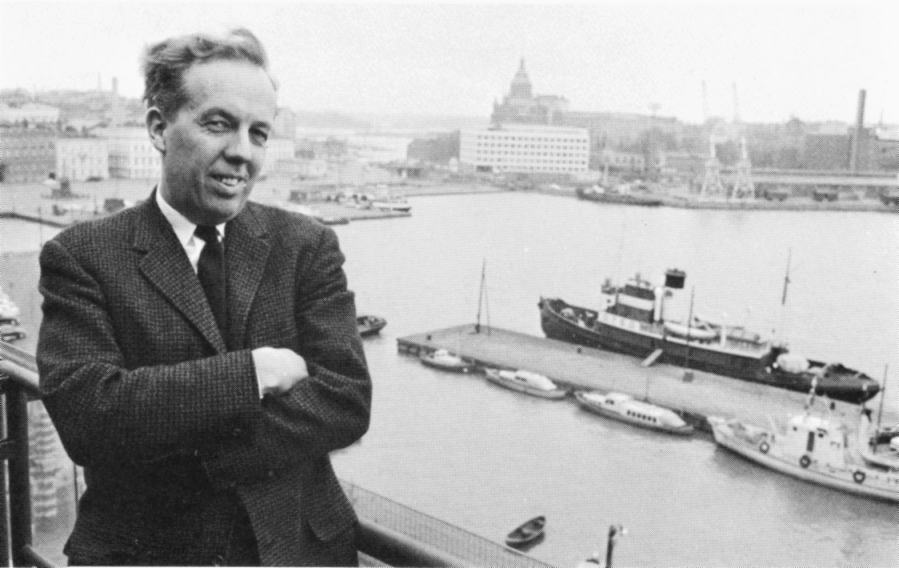
Werner Wiskari in Helsinki in November 1961.

Werner M. Wiskari (May 16, 1918, Michigan – December 8, 2008, Wakefield, Charlestown, Rhode Island, United States) was a Finnish-American journalist who worked for The New York Times for 36 years. Wiskari's parents were Finnish immigrants.

Wiskari served in Pacific Theater of World War II as a member of the U.S. Navy. After the war he studied journalism at Columbia University and began his career with The New York Times in 1948 as a radio news scriptwriter. From 1958–1964, Wiskari was a correspondent for the New York Times in Northern Europe. He was based in Stockholm, where he reported on the annual Nobel Prize award winners, the difficulties both Sweden as well as Finland faced with staying neutral in the shadow of the Soviet Union during the midst of the Cold War, and about general Nordic life.

In 1959, Wiskari was the first foreign journalist to interview the President of Finland Urho Kekkonen. Wiskari visited Kekkonen several times in Helsinki, Finland even after his post ended in Stockholm.

In 1968, Wiskari became an assistant to the foreign news editor at The New York Times. Shortly thereafter, in 1971, he served as a member of a team of editors who were charged with preparing the Pentagon papers which covered the U.S. involvement in the Vietnam War for publication.

In 1978, Wiskari reported that Finnish President Urho Kekkonen was suffering from memory problems. He was the only western journalist to do so because the Finnish media censored the illness of the president.

In the 1980s, Wiskari reported on the Iran–Iraq War.

Wiskari retired from journalism in 1984 and moved to Charlestown, Rhode Island. He wrote a memoir, Bad Weather Bird, on his time in Northern Europe.

Wiskari was a member of Charlestown's local council, serving as a Democrat member.
