= Yuexin Xiong =

Chinese beauty pageant titleholder

Yuexin Xiong; 岳信熊
- Born: Yuexin Xiong; China
- Beauty pageant titleholder
- Title: Miss United Nations China 2020; Miss Chengdu Beauty 2020; Miss Beauty World 2021; Miss Cosmo China 2025
- Major competitions: Miss Chengdu Beauty 2020 (Winner); Miss Beauty World 2021 (Winner); Miss Universe China 2024 (Top 10); Miss Cosmo China 2025 (Winner); Miss Cosmo 2025 (Unplaced)

Yuexin Xiong is a Chinese beauty pageant titleholder, who won Miss Chengdu Beauty 2020 and Miss Cosmo China 2025. She will represent China at Miss Cosmo 2025 in Vietnam.

== Pageantry ==
Yuexin Xiong's first pageant was Miss Universe China 2024, where she reached the top 10. She won Miss Photogenic. Xiong won the inaugural Miss Cosmo China 2025 on April 28, 2025. She was crowned by Miss Cosmo 2024, Ketut Permata Juliastrid. She will represent China at Miss Cosmo 2025 in Vietnam.

== Fashion Show ==
Year	Role	Collection	Venue	Designer/ Brand	Ref
2025	First Face	Tinh thần dân tộc ( 民族精神 )	Vietnam - China Friendship Exchange Festival	Lê Hữu Nhân	

Awards and achievements
Preceded by Katherine Wong	Miss Beauty World; 2021	Succeeded by Aurélie Opęchowska
Preceded by Yang Xuxin	Miss Chengdu Beauty; 2020	Succeeded by Liu Xiaoxin
Preceded by None	Miss Cosmo China; 2025	Succeeded by Tang Qiaowen
