= Isabel Chikoti =

Zambian beauty pageant titleholder

- Born: Isabel Chikoti; Chingola, Zambia
- Beauty pageant titleholder
- Title: Miss Universe Zambia 2017
- Major competitions: Miss Universe Zambia 2017 (Winner ); Miss Universe 2017 (Unplaced); Miss Grand Zambia 2018 (Winner); Miss Grand International 2018 (Unplaced)

Isabel Chikoti is a Zambian beauty pageant titleholder. In 2017, she won Miss Zambia and was the country's representative at Miss Universe the same year.

== Miss Universe Zambia 2017 ==
Chikoti was crowned Miss Universe Zambia 2017, held at the Mulungushi Conference Centre. She beat 16 other candidates for the title. Mercy Mukwiza was first princess and Luwi Kawanda was second princess.

== Miss Universe 2017 ==
Chikoti represented Zambia at Miss Universe 2017 on November 26, 2017, but did not place.

== Voice Of Finland 2024 ==
Chikoti competed in the 13th season of Voice of Finland in 2024. She reached the live shows but was eliminated in the quarterfinals.

== Personal life ==
Chikoti has one child with her Finnish husband whom she met in Zambia. They live in Espoo, Finland.

Awards and achievements
Preceded by Alice Rowlands Musukwa	Miss Universe Zambia; 2017	Succeeded by Melba Shakabozha
