= Kofi Annan University of Guinea =

Private university in Conakry, Guinea

- Université Kofi-Annan de Guinée
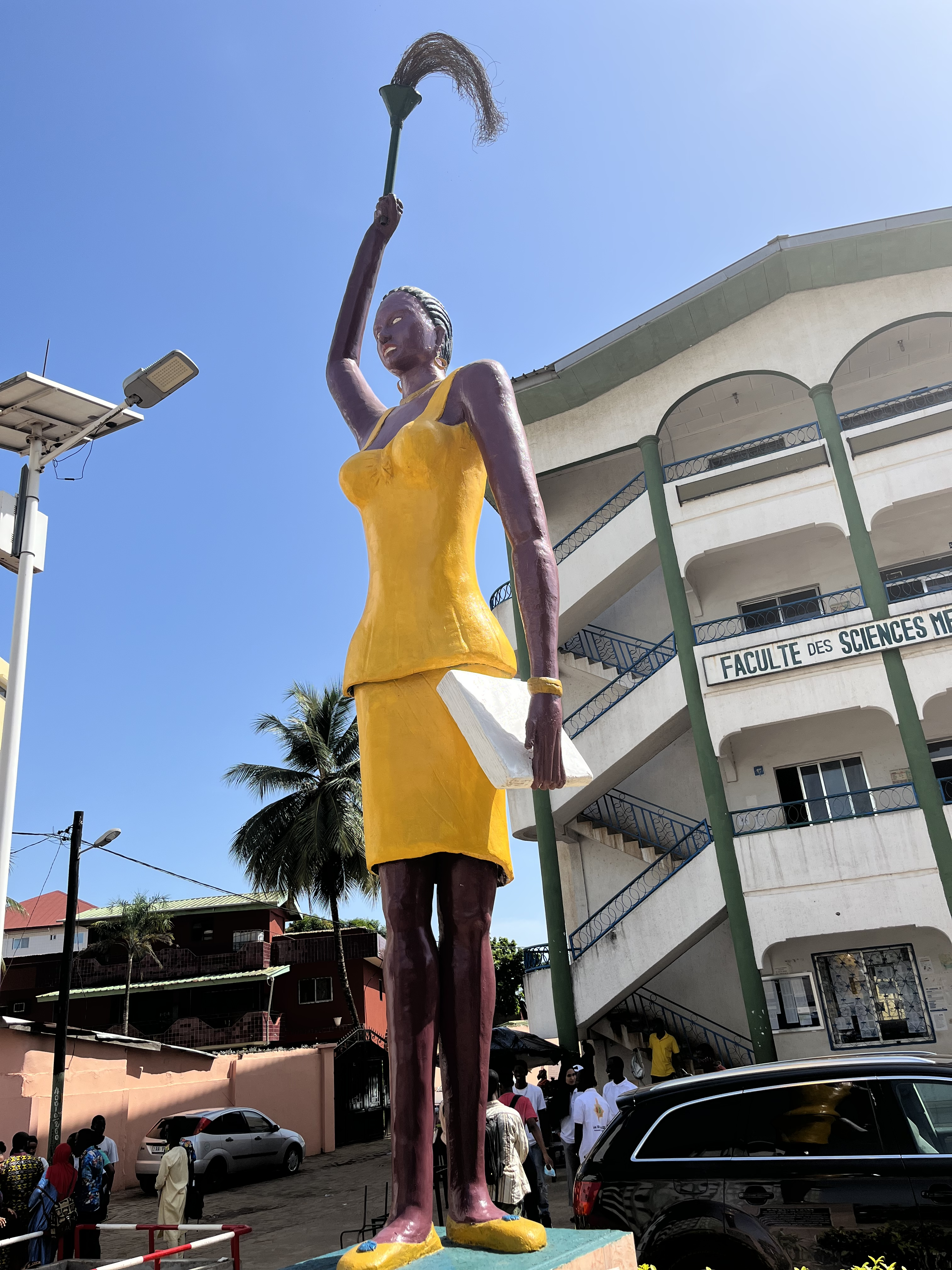
- Motto: The ambition of excellence and modernity
- Type: Private university
- Established: May 28, 1999
- Founder: Ousmane Kaba
- Affiliations: CAMES; Université Félix-Houphouët-Boigny
- President: Ousmane Kaba
- Rector: Mohamed Tayeb Laskri
- Students: 6000
- Location: Conakry, Guinea; 9.615489°N 13.637824°W
- Language: French
- Website: www.ukaguinee.org

The Kofi Annan University of Guinea (abbreviated as UKAG) is a private university in West Africa located in Nongo, Ratoma Commune, Republic of Guinea. It is the oldest private higher education institution in Guinea.

Founded by Ousmane Kaba, it is named after the former Ghanaian diplomat Kofi Annan, who was the Secretary-General of the United Nations from 1997 to 2006.

== History and mission ==
The Kofi Annan University of Guinea, endowed with legal personality and financial autonomy, was created on May 28, 1999 (law no. 2814/MESR/CAB) with the missions to:

- Offer general and professional higher education and training;
- Promote scientific research;
- Promote new information and communication technologies.

=== Presidents ===
No.	Name	Start	End
1	Ousmane Kaba	1999	Ongoing

=== Libraries ===
The library is located on the third floor of the administrative building and contains over 50,000 titles in virtual and digital formats, as well as more than 40 computer workstations equipped with internet for staff and students.

=== Cultural space ===
The Kofi Annan University of Guinea also has a cultural space that hosts various forums, conferences, panels, and exhibitions.

=== Entrepreneurship House ===
On February 11, 2023, the Entrepreneurship House of Kofi Annan University of Guinea was inaugurated. The ceremony took place in the presence of Diaka Sidibé, Minister of Higher Education, Scientific Research, and Innovation.

== Organization and administration ==
=== Admissions and curriculum ===
More than 6000 students are enrolled, and the number remains stable despite the government's ban on directing students to private universities in 2016.

=== Online courses ===
The health situation faced by Guinea in 2014–2015 with the Ebola virus and in 2019-2020 led to increased use of the university's online platform.

=== Notable people ===
- Ousmane Kaba

=== Notable alumni ===
- Habib Baldé, Former member of the National Assembly of the Republic of Guinea (2013 to September 5, 2021)
- Noël Kolomou, President of the CRIEF
- Aboubacar Sidiki Cissé, Member of the National Transition Council.

== Organization ==
The Kofi Annan University of Guinea comprises five faculties and one institute:

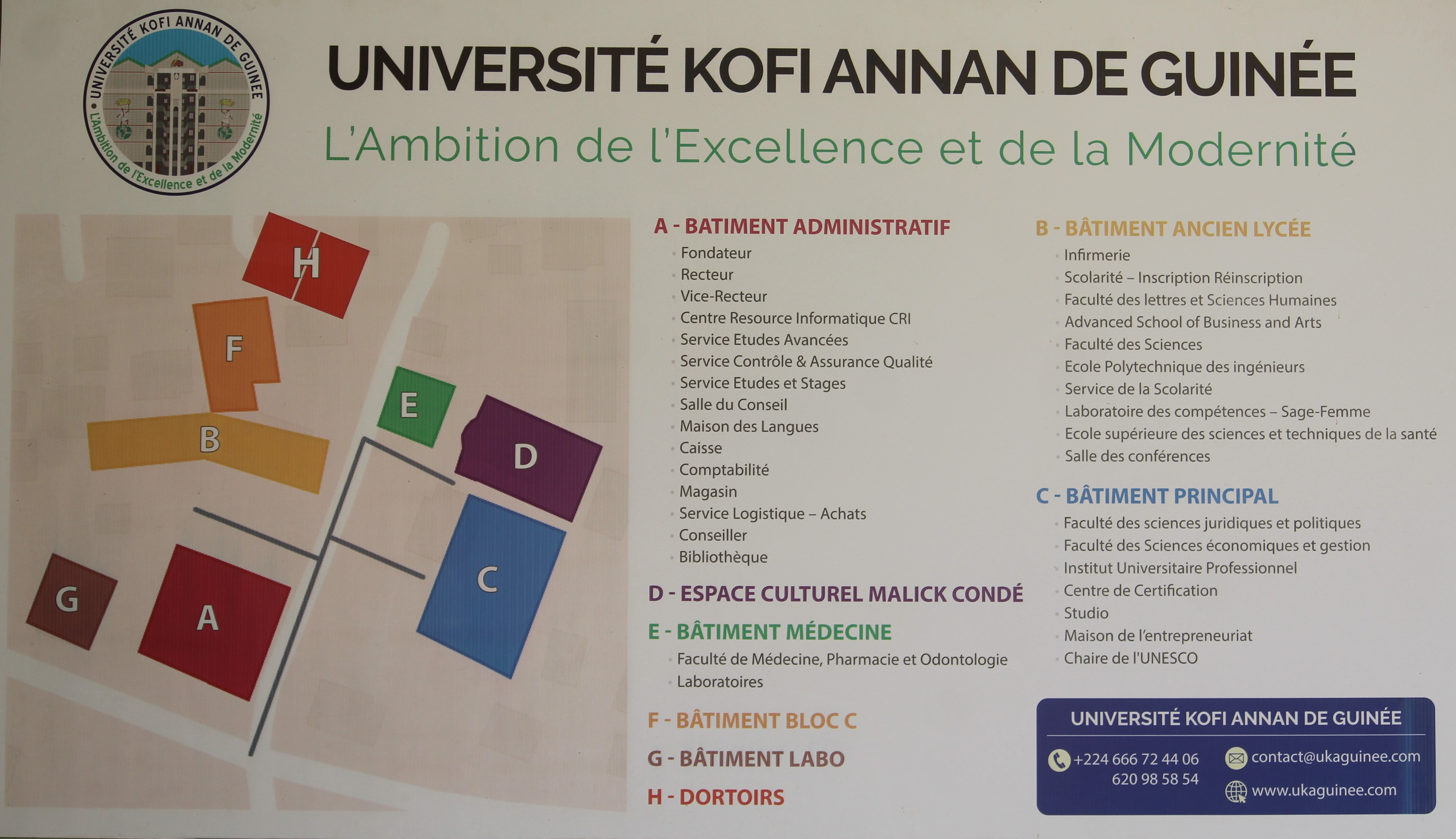
Campus map of the university.

- Faculty of Medicine, Pharmacy, and Odonto-stomatology
- Faculty of Sciences
- Faculty of Economics and Management
- Faculty of Law and Political Science
- Faculty of Arts and Humanities
- Polytechnic School of Engineering
- Advanced School of Business and Arts
- Higher School of Health Sciences and Technology
- University Institute for Professional and BTS Studies

== Gallery ==
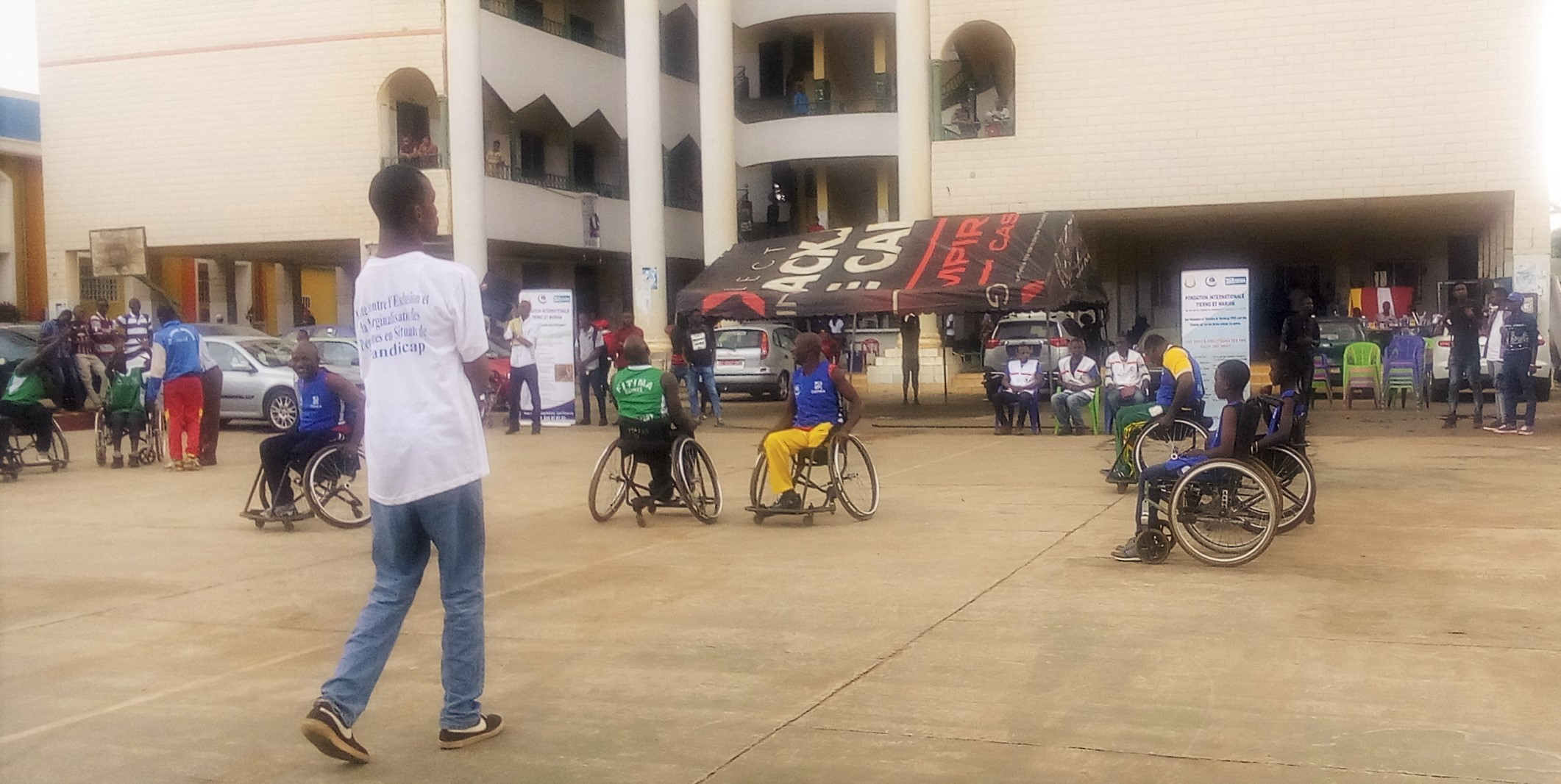
Basketball for people with disabilities

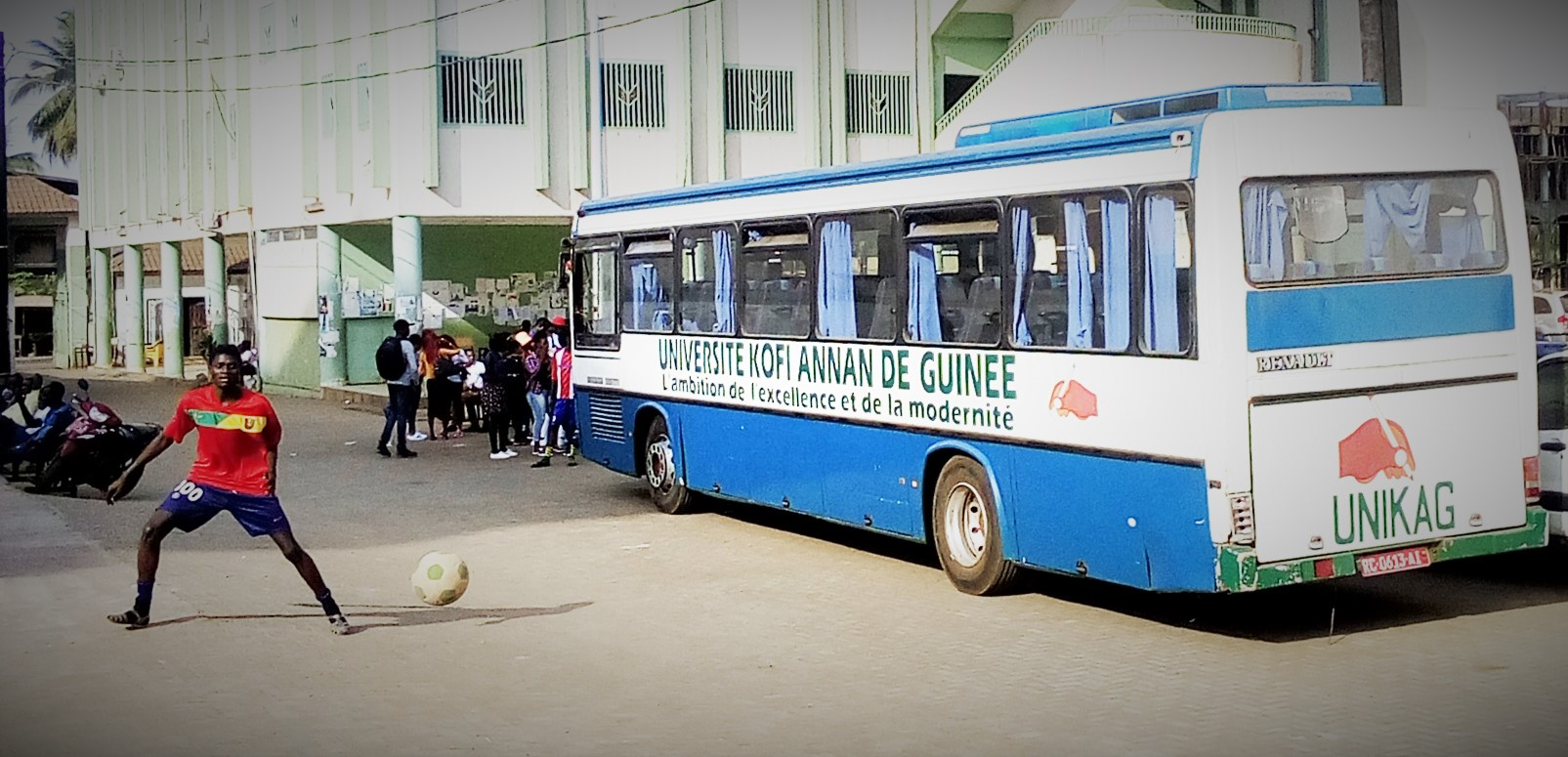
Football and university bus

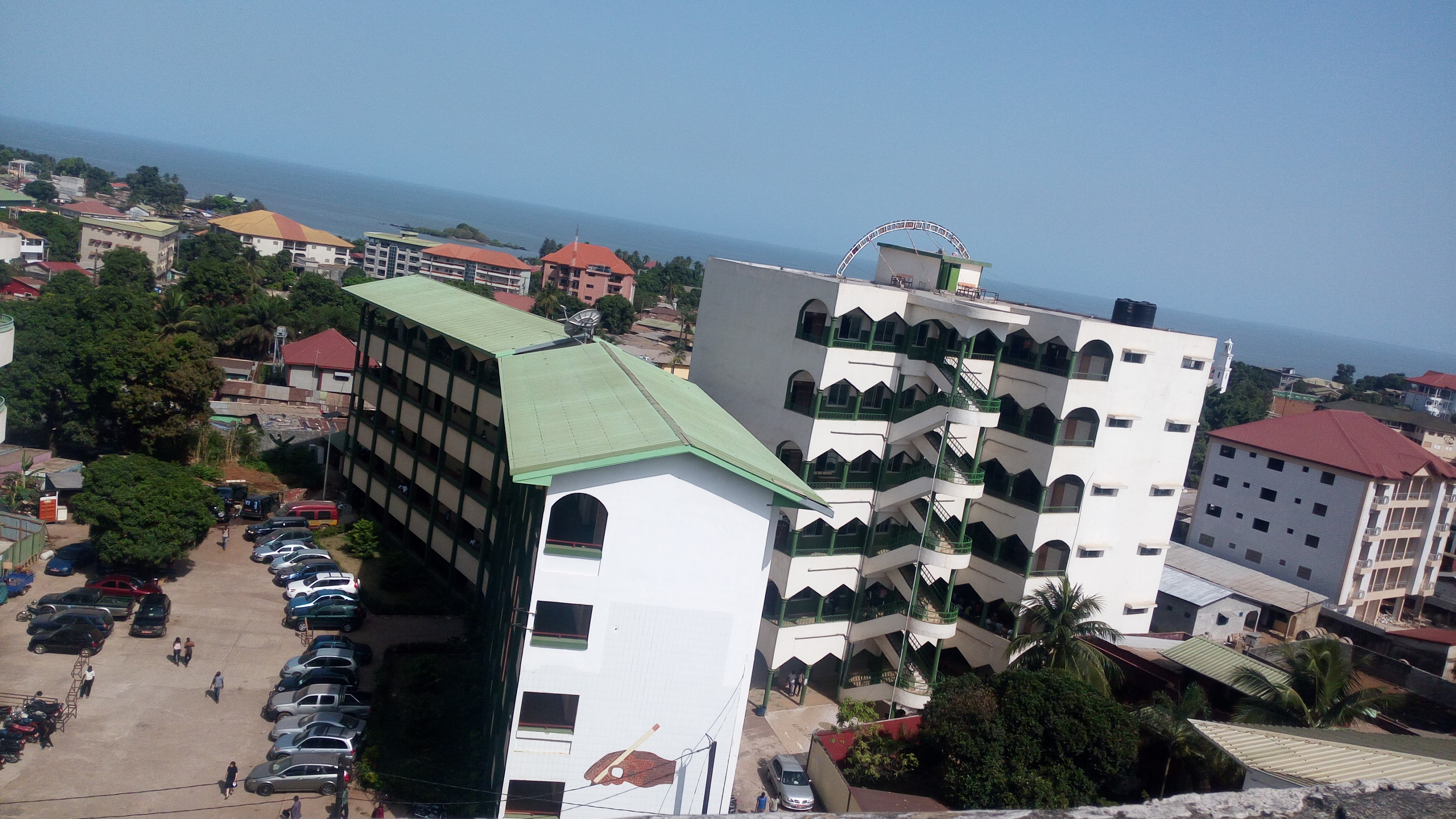
View of the sea

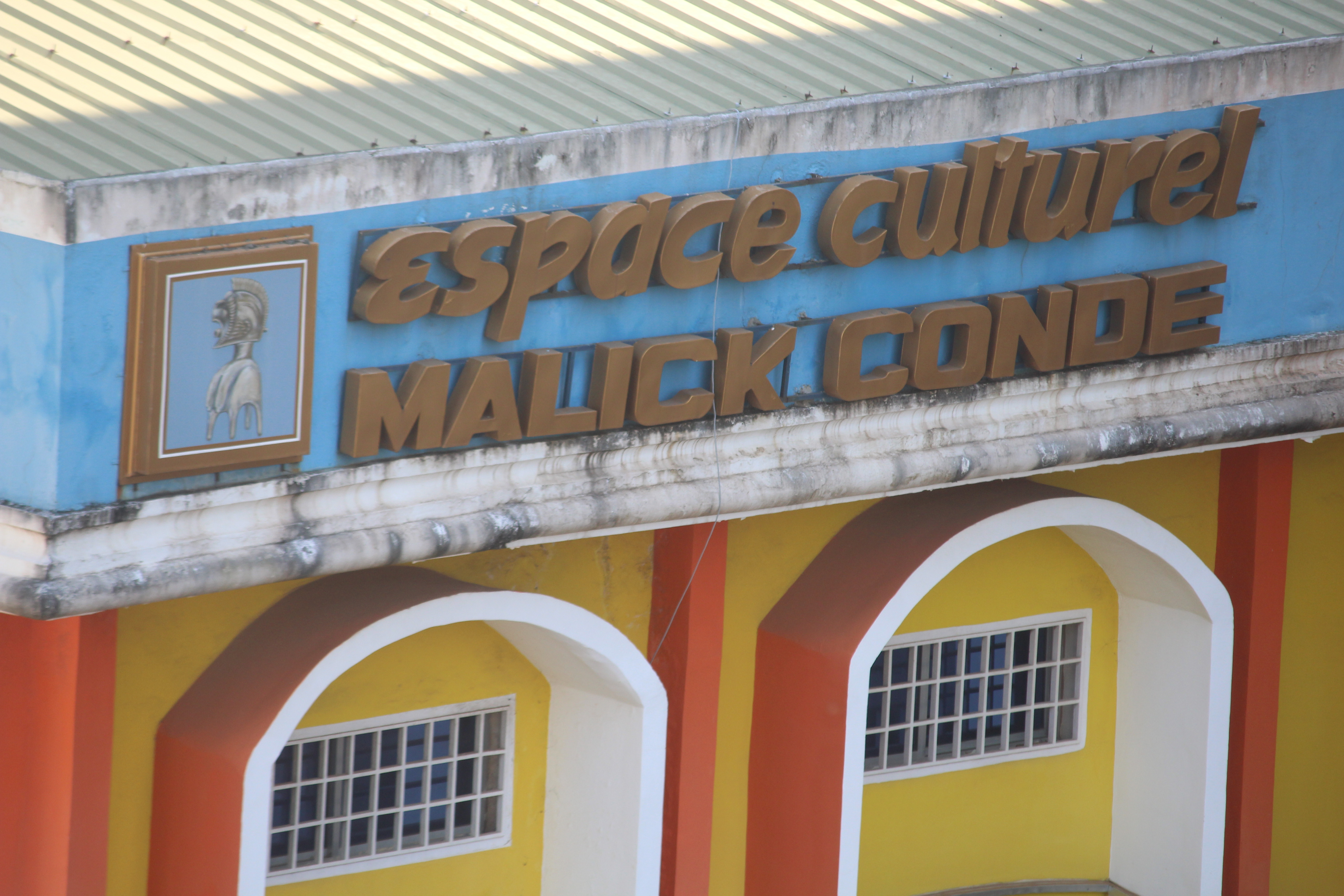
Malick Condé Cultural Space
