= Arttu Wiskari =

Finnish singer-songwriter (born 1984)

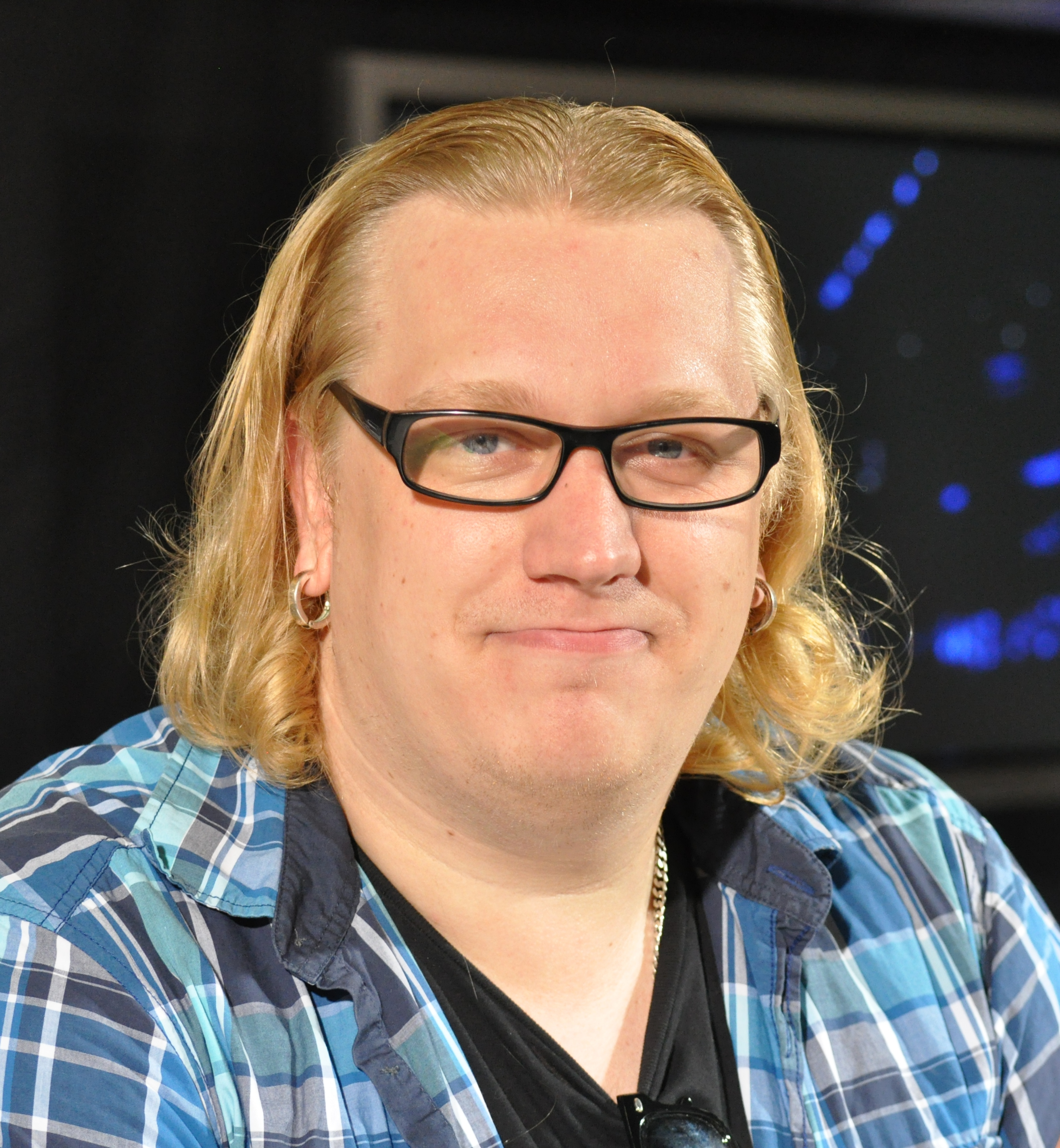
- Wiskari at Helsinki Music Fair in 2011

Background information
- Born: Arttu-Pekka Aleksi Wiskari; 16 September 1984 (age 41); Espoo, Finland
- Genres: Blues, pop, rock
- Years active: 2006–present
- Label: Warner Music Finland

Arttu-Pekka Aleksi Wiskari (born 16 September 1984) is a Finnish singer-songwriter.

== Career ==
Wiskari was born in Espoo. Before his full-time musical career, Wiskari worked at the Finnish hardware store RTV. His eponymous debut album was released in June 2011 by Warner Music Finland. The album was certified Platinum (20,000 copies) and reached the top of the Finnish album chart.

His second album, Tappavan hiljainen rivarinpätkä, was released in April 2013, and it reached number seven on the album chart.

Wiskari's third album, Sirpaleet, was released in November 2014. It peaked at number six on the album chart. Its second single, "Sirpa", was criticized by a reviewer from the Rumba magazine, who claimed it was "plagiarizing" the Finnish band Leevi and the Leavings. However, this was meant more as a figure of speech rather than an accusation of actual plagiarism.

In November 2016, Wiskari released his fourth album titled IV. The album peaked at number fourteen on its debut week.

In November 2018, Wiskari released the single "Suomen muotoisen pilven alla". The song peaked at number four on the singles chart and became the most played radio track of 2019 in Finland.

In April 2020, Wiskari released "Tässäkö tää oli?", a single featuring Leavings-Orkesteri, which was formed by surviving members of the former Leevi and the Leavings. The song debuted at number six.

Wiskari has also appeared on several Finnish television programs, including The Voice Kids, Tähdet, tähdet, and Vain elämää.

== Discography ==
=== Albums ===
Title	Details	Peak chart positions
Title	Details	FIN
Arttu Wiskari	Released: 2011; Label: Warner Music Finland	1
Tappavan hiljainen rivarinpätkä	Released: 2013; Label: Warner Music Finland	7
Sirpaleet	Released: 2014; Label: Warner Music Finland	6
IV	Released: 11 November 2016; Label: Warner Music Finland	14
Suomen muotoisen pilven alla	Released: 28 August 2020; Label: Warner Music Finland	1

=== Singles ===
Year	Single	Peak chart positions	Album
Year	Single	FIN	Album
2006	"Up Where We Belong"	—	Non-album singles
2006	"Romanssi"	—	Non-album singles
2006	"In the Heat of the Night / Ice Cream Man"	—	Non-album singles
2010	"Mökkitie"	12	Arttu Wiskari
2011	"Tuntematon potilas"	3	Arttu Wiskari
2011	"Sorateiden sankarit"	—	Arttu Wiskari
2013	"Ikuisesti kahdestaan"	—	Tappavan hiljainen rivarinpätkä
2014	"Avaimet käteen"	—	Sirpaleet
2014	"Sirpa" (feat. Ulpu)	9	Sirpaleet
2015	"Kahvimaito"	14	IV
2016	"Kuningaslohi"	—	IV
2016	"Sadun alkkarit"	—	IV
2016	"Ystävän remppa"	—	IV
2017	"Työmiehen lauantai" (feat. Tippa-T)	20	Non-album singles
2017	"Meidän biisi"	4	Non-album singles
2018	"Suomen muotoisen pilven alla"	4	Suomen muotoisen pilven alla
2020	"Tässäkö tää oli?" (featuring Leavings-Orkesteri)	2	Suomen muotoisen pilven alla
2021	"Kankaanpään tori" (featuring Mira Luoti)	8	Vain elämää kausi 12
2023	"Pilvilinna"	50	Non-album singles
2023	"Minna"	29	Non-album singles
2024	"Monaco"	27	Non-album singles
2025	"AAAA"	40	Non-album singles
2026	"Suomi Finland perkele"	23	Non-album singles

== Filmography ==
Year	Title	Original title	Role
2006	Graffiti Within	Graffiti meissä	Janita's brother
2009	What Became of Us	Mitä meistä tuli	Arttu
2012	Zone	Vyöhyke	Jansson
2018	Super Furball	Supermarsu	Pertti
