= Miss Universe Zambia =

Beauty contest

MUZO
- Formation: 1995
- Type: Beauty pageant
- Headquarters: Lusaka
- Location: Zambia
- Members: Miss Universe
- Official language: English
- President: Tendai Hunda; Zodwa Mkandla (National Director)
- Website: missuniversezambia.com

Miss Universe Zambia is a beauty pageant to select Zambian women to compete in the Miss Universe pageant. The current President is Tendai Hunda and Zodwa Mkandla designated as the national director of Miss Universe Zambia.

== History ==
=== 1993–1994 ===
Zambia's first attempt to compete in the Miss Universe was in 1993, with the Miss Zambia 1992, Elizabeth Mwanza but nevertheless she could not arrive in Mexico to compete due to problems with the Mexican visa. She postponed her participation to the following year, and she had the same problem with the Filipino visa, and she finally gave up participating in the Miss Universe.

=== 1995–1998 ===
The Miss Universe Zambia pageant headquartered in Lusaka and created first winning pageant, Luo Trica Punabantu of Lusaka to Miss Universe 1995 in Windhoek, Namibia. In this period the Miss Zambia Universe organizer was Eva Kazembe and she had only had contributed in 1995 edition of Miss Universe. She had already chosen queens in 1996 (Tamara Kalube) and in 1997 (Kusobile Kamwambi), but none of them competed in Miss Universe pageant due to the lack of funds, problems with the American visa, in addition that Organization did not delivering them the promised awards. In 1998, Eva lost the franchise.

=== 1999–2000 ===
Miss Zambia Pageant obtained the license again for 2 years and contributed to Zambia's second participation in the Miss Universe with Esanju Kalopa, Miss Zambia 1998 pageant first princess in Chaguaramas, Trinidad and Tobago. The following year the followed participation was planned with Sidonia Mwape, Miss Zambia 1999 pageant first princess but due lack of money and sponsors, she could not compete in the Miss Universe 2000, in Nicosia, Cyprus. Miss Zambia Pageant was delayed by 3 years until 2003 due lack of money and sponsors, and the organizers decided dropping the Miss Universe licence in 2001.

=== 2005–2010 ===
After a hiatus of 5 years, the Miss Universe Zambia took over by Mrs. Wendy Chandra-Fornari in Lusaka. The Miss Universe Zambia winners mostly achieved high placement in another beauty competitions such as Miss Tourism Queen International and Miss Africa International. On May 28, 2010, the last Miss Universe Zambia under Mrs. Wendy was Alice Rowlands Musukwa of Chipata. She represented Zambia in Miss Universe 2010 edition in Las Vegas, USA.

=== 2017–2019 ===
The license holder of Miss Universe in Zambia between 2017 and 2019 was in Alice Rowlands, former Miss Universe Zambia 2010.

=== 2024―present ===
A new era is beginning, providing an open space for Zambia to return to Miss Universe. Starting in 2024, Tendai Hunda will take over the Miss Universe Zambia license, working closely with the Zambian team and Zodwa Mkandla, the new national director of Miss Universe Zambia.

== Titleholders ==
- : Declared as Winner
- : Ended as runner-up or top 5/6 qualification
- : Ended as one of the finalists or semifinalists
- : Ended as special awards winner

Year	Province	Miss Zambia	Placement at Miss Universe	Special Award(s)	Notes
Alice Musukwa directorship — a franchise holder to Miss Universe from 2025
2026	Southern Province	Mubanga Hatyoka	Did not compete		
2025	Copperbelt	Kunda Mwamulima	Unplaced		
Tundai Hunda directorship — a franchise holder to Miss Universe from 2024
2024	Copperbelt	Brandina Lubuli	Unplaced		
Alice Musukwa directorship — a franchise holder to Miss Universe between 2017―2019
Did not compete between 2020-2023
2019	Lusaka	Didia Mukwala	Did not compete		Didia decided to quit from Miss Universe 2019, due to lack of sponsorships.
2018	Southern Province	Melba Shakabozha	Unplaced		
2017	Copperbelt	Isabel Chikoti	Unplaced		
Wendy Chandra-Fornari directorship — a franchise holder to Miss Universe between 2005―2010
Did not compete between 2011—2016
2010	Eastern Province	Alice Rowlands Musukwa	Unplaced		
2009	Luapula	Andella Chileshe Matthews	Unplaced		
Did not compete in 2008
2007	Lusaka	Rosemary Chileshe	Unplaced		
2006	Southern Province	Mofya Nickoleta Chisenga†	Unplaced		
2005	Lusaka	Cynthia Kanema	Unplaced		
Miss Universe Zambia (another agency) directorship — a franchise holder to Miss Universe between 1993―2000
Did not compete between 2001—2004
2000	Lusaka	Sidonia Mwape	Did not compete		Sidonia decided to quit from Miss Universe 2000, due to lack of sponsorships.
1999	Muchinga	Esanju Kalopa†	Unplaced		
Did not compete between 1997—1998
1996	Lusaka	Tamara Kalube	Did not compete		
1995	Lusaka	Luo Trica Punabantu	Unplaced		
Did not compete in 1994
1993	Lusaka	Elizabeth Mwanza	Did not compete		

=== Wins by province ===
Province	Titles	Years
Lusaka	7	1993, 1995, 1996, 2000, 2005, 2007, 2019
Copperbelt	3	2017, 2024, 2025
Bulawayo	3	2006, 2018, 2026
Eastern Province	1	2010
Luapula	1	2009
Muchinga	1	1999

== Notable winner notes ==
- Alice Rowlands Musukwa, the new franchise holder of Miss Universe Zambia Organization began in 2017 and current fashion Model in South Africa and she is the youngest national director.
- Andella Chileshe Matthews was replaced by her runner-up, Sthabiso Mteliso. In 2014 she won Miss Princess of the World.
- Rosemary Chileshe, Founder of Swanilenga Group Ltd.
