= Miss Zambia =

Beauty pageant

- Type: Beauty pageant
- Headquarters: Lusaka
- Location: Zambia
- Members: Miss World; Miss Universe; Miss Supranational; Miss Grand International; Miss Cosmo
- Official language: English
- Website: Official page

Miss Zambia is a national Beauty pageant in Zambia that selects representatives for Big five international beauty pageants.

== Miss World Zambia ==
Color key

- Declared as Winner
- Ended as runner-up
- Ended as one of the finalists or semifinalists

Year	Miss World Zambia	Hometown	Placement at Miss World	Special Awards
2026	Adah Mushibi	Lusaka	Top 12	
2025	Faith Bwalya	Kitwe	Top 40	Head to Head Challenge Winner; Top 48 at Miss World Talent
2024	no competition held			
2023	Natasha-Joan Mapulanga	Lusaka	Did not compete	
2022	Due to the impact of COVID-19 pandemic, no competition held			
2021	Vanessa Ukevwe Chinyemba	Lusaka	Did not compete	
2018	Musa Kalaluka	Lusaka	Unplaced	
2017	Mary Chibula	Mongu	Unplaced	
2017	Mwangala Ikacana	Kitwe	Did not compete	
2017	Louisa Josephs	Dethroned		
2014	Michelo Malambo	Ndola	Unplaced	
2013	Christine Mwaaba	Lusaka	Unplaced	
2010	Zindaba Hansala	Lusaka	Unplaced	
2009	Sekwila Mumba	Lusaka	Unplaced	
2008	Winfridah Mofu	Lusaka	Unplaced	
2006	Katanekwa Matundwelo	Lusaka	Unplaced	Top 24 at Miss World Sport
2005	Kabungo Mumbi	Lusaka	Unplaced	
2004	Rosemary Chileshe	Lusaka	Unplaced	
2003	Cynthia Kanema	Lusaka	Unplaced	
1999	Cynthia Chikwanda	Lusaka	Unplaced	
1998	Chisala Chibesa	Lusaka	Unplaced	
1997	Tukuza Tembo	Lusaka	Unplaced	
1996	Alice Banda	Lusaka	Unplaced	
1995	Miryana Bujisic	Lusaka	Unplaced	
1992	Elizabeth Mwanza	Lusaka	Unplaced	
1974	Mable Chipasha	Lusaka	Unplaced	

== Miss Supranational Zambia ==
Color key

- Declared as Winner
- Ended as runner-up
- Ended as one of the finalists or semifinalists

Year	Miss Supranational Zambia	Hometown	Placement at Miss Supranational	Special Awards
2025	Namakau Nawa	Mongu	Top 24	TBA
2023	Candy Mathews	Lusaka	Unplaced	
2022	Savena Mushinge	Lusaka	Unplaced	
2020	Due to the impact of COVID-19 pandemic, no competition in 2020-2021			
2019	Mercy Mukwiza	Livingstone	Unplaced	Top 10 Supra influencer of the year
