= Cynthia Kanema =

Zambian model (born 1983)

- Born: Cynthia Kanema; 1983 (age 42–43); Zambia
- Children: 2
- Beauty pageant titleholder
- Title: Miss Zambia 2003
- Major competitions: Miss World 2003; Miss International 2004; Miss Universe 2005; Miss Earth 2005

Cynthia Kanema (born 1983) is a female model from Zambia. The first person that competed in all Big Four pageants.

Born in 1983. Crowned as Miss Zambia representing Lusaka in 2003. On 6 Dec. 2003, she competed in Miss World 2003 in Sanya, China. On 16 Oct, 2004, competed in Miss International 2004 in Beijing.

On 31 May 2005, she competed in Miss Universe 2005 in Nonthaburi province, Thailand as Miss Zambia Universe. After this pageant, she was appointed tourism ambassador for Thailand.

On 23 Oct, 2005, competed in Miss Earth 2005 in Quezon City, Philippines. After competing these pageants, she founded HighStyle Etiquette & Grooming to teach personal development, grooming and etiquettes. She is one of the judges of Cynthia Kanema super model search, the most prestigious beauty pageant in Zambia.

In 2011, she put her modelling career on hold to focus on marriage and two children. Cynthia says she has no regrets about retiring at the height of the career.。
