= Miss Universe Nicaragua =

National beauty pageant in Nicaragua

- Type: Women's beauty pageant
- Headquarters: Miami; Managua
- Country represented: Nicaragua
- Qualifies for: Miss Universe
- First edition: 2024
- Most recent edition: 2026
- Current titleholder: Jasmine Blandford; South Caribbean Coast
- Sub Director: Julián Pantoja
- CEO/President: Javier Pastora
- National Director: Daniel Guevara
- Language: Spanish; English
- Predecessor: Miss Nicaragua
- Website: missuniversenic.com

Miss Universe Nicaragua or Miss Nicaragua is a beauty pageant and organization that selects Nicaragua's official representative to Miss Universe.

The reining Miss Universe Nicaragua 2026 is Jasmine Blandford from the South Caribbean Coast, who was crowned September 4, 2026 in Miami, Florida, United States by Itza Castillo.

On June 2025, Daniel Guevara was announced as the new national director for Nicaragua on 2025.

== History ==
From 1955 to 2023, Miss Nicaragua held the national franchise for Miss Universe, wherein it was responsible for selecting Nicaraguans to represent Nicaragua and compete at the annual Miss Universe pageant. Under Miss Nicaragua, Nicaragua representatives to the Miss Universe pageant were crowned with the title of Señorita Nicaragua from 1955 to 1999, and Miss Nicaragua from 2001 to 2023.

In September 2024, the Miss Universe Organization introduced a new franchise under Miss Universe Nicaragua. This is an organization outside Nicaragua. Since November 2023 after Sheynnis Palacios, Miss Nicaragua 2023 won the Miss Universe 2023 held in San Salvador, El Salvador Ortega's government cancelled the pageant in Nicaragua and getting out national directors from the previous organization.

== Winners by year ==
Year	Department	Miss Universe Nicaragua	Venue
2026	South Caribbean Coast	Jasmine Blandford	InterContinental Miami, Downtown Miami, Florida, United States
2025	Managua	Itza Castillo	James L. Knight Center Coliseum, Downtown Miami, Florida, United States
2024	Chontales	Geyssell García	Mexico City Arena, Mexico City, Mexico

== Titleholders under Miss Universe Nicaragua org. ==
=== Miss Universe Nicaragua 2024—Present ===
- : Declared as Winner
- : Ended as Runner-Up or Top 5/6 qualification
- : Ended as one of the Finalist/Semi-finalists
- : Unplaced but given special award(s)

Year	Miss Universe Nicaragua	Age	State		
Year	Miss Universe Nicaragua	Age	State	Placement at Miss Universe	Special award(s)
2026	Jasmine Blandford	27	South Caribbean Coast	TBA	
2025	Itza Castillo	29	Managua	Top 30	
2024	Geyssell García	29	Chontales	Top 30	

=== Miss Nicaragua 1955—2023 ===
The winner of Miss Nicaragua represents her country at Miss Universe. On occasion, when the winner does not qualify (due to age) for either contest, a runner-up is sent. Since 2023, the election of Miss Universe Nicaragua took over the franchise of Miss Universe in Nicaragua.

Year	Miss Nicaragua	Age	State		
Year	Miss Nicaragua	Age	State	Placement at Miss Universe	Special award(s)
2023	Sheynnis Palacios	23	Carazo	Miss Universe 2023	
2022	Norma Huembes	24	Carazo	Unplaced	
2021	Allison Wassmer	26	Managua	Unplaced	
2020	Ana Marcelo	24	Estelí	Top 21	
2019	Inés López	19	Managua	Unplaced	
2018	Adriana Paniagua	23	Chinandega	Unplaced	
2017	Berenice Quezada	24	South Caribbean Coast	Unplaced	
2016	Marina Jacoby	21	Matagalpa	Unplaced	
2015	Daniela Torres	25	Managua	Unplaced	Best National Costume (4th Place)
2014	Marline Barberena	27	Chinandega	Unplaced	
2013	Nastassja Bolívar	25	Carazo	Top 16	Best National Costume
2012	Farah Eslaquit	21	Masaya	Unplaced	Best National Costume (6th Place)
2011	Adriana Dorn	24	Managua	Unplaced	
2010	Scharllette Allen	18	South Caribbean Coast	Unplaced	
2009	Indiana Sánchez	22	Managua	Unplaced	Best in National Costume (2nd Place)
2008	Thelma Rodríguez	19	Chinandega	Unplaced	
2007	Xiomara Blandino	22	Managua	Top 10	
2006	Cristiana Frixione	22	Managua	Unplaced	
2005	Daniela Clerk	23	Managua	Unplaced	
2004	Marifely Argüello	22	Managua	Unplaced	
2003	Claudia Salmerón	25	Managua	Unplaced	
2002	Marianela Lacayo	21	Managua	Unplaced	
2001	Ligia Argüello	21	Managua	Unplaced	
2000	No competition held				
1999	Liliana Pilarte	23	Río San Juan	Unplaced	
1998	Claudia Alaniz	21	Managua	Unplaced	
1997	No competition held				
1996	Luz María Sánchez Herdocia	–	Managua	Did not compete	
1995	Linda Clerk	22	Managua	Unplaced	
1994	No competition held				
1993	Luisa Urcuyo	18	Rivas	Unplaced	
1992	Ida Delaney		Managua	Unplaced	
1991	Ana Sofía Pereira		Managua	Unplaced	
No competition held between 1980–1990
1979	Patricia Pineda	–	Rivas	Withdrew from the competition	
1978	Claudia Herrera		Masaya	Unplaced	
1977	Beatriz Obregón	18	Rivas	Top 12	
1976	Ivania Navarro		Matagalpa	Unplaced	
1975	Alda Maritza Sánchez		Masaya	Unplaced	
1974	Francis Duarte		León	Unplaced	
1973	Ana Saravia	18	Managua	Unplaced	
1972	No competition held				
1971	Xiomara Paguaga	20	Managua	Unplaced	
1970	Graciela Salazar	–	León	Unplaced	
1969	Soraya Herrera	18	Managua	Unplaced	
1968	Margine Davidson	20	Matagalpa	Unplaced	
No competition held between 1964–1967
1963	Leda Sánchez	20	Carazo	Unplaced	
No competition held between 1956–1962
1955	Rosa Argentina Lacayo †	19	Managua	Unplaced	Best Dressed Girl

== Placements in Miss Universe ==
This list includes the placements, unplacements, and absences of Miss Universe Nicaragua in the international competition.

Placement	Total	Year
Miss Universe	1	2023
1st Runner-up	0	
2nd Runner-up	0	
3rd Runner-up	0	
4th Runner-up	0	
Top 5/6	0	
Top 9/10/12	2	1977, 2007
Top 13/15/16/20/21/30	4	2013, 2020, 2024, 2025
Total	7	
Unplaced	36	1963, 1968–1971, 1973–1976, 1978, 1991–1993, 1995, 1998–1999, 2001–2006, 2008–2012, 2014–2019, 2021–2022.
Total	36	
Absent	31	1952–1954, 1956–1962, 1964–1967, 1972, 1979–1990, 1994, 1996–1997, 2000.

== Titleholder gallery ==
Miss Universe Nicaragua 2026
Jasmine Blandford

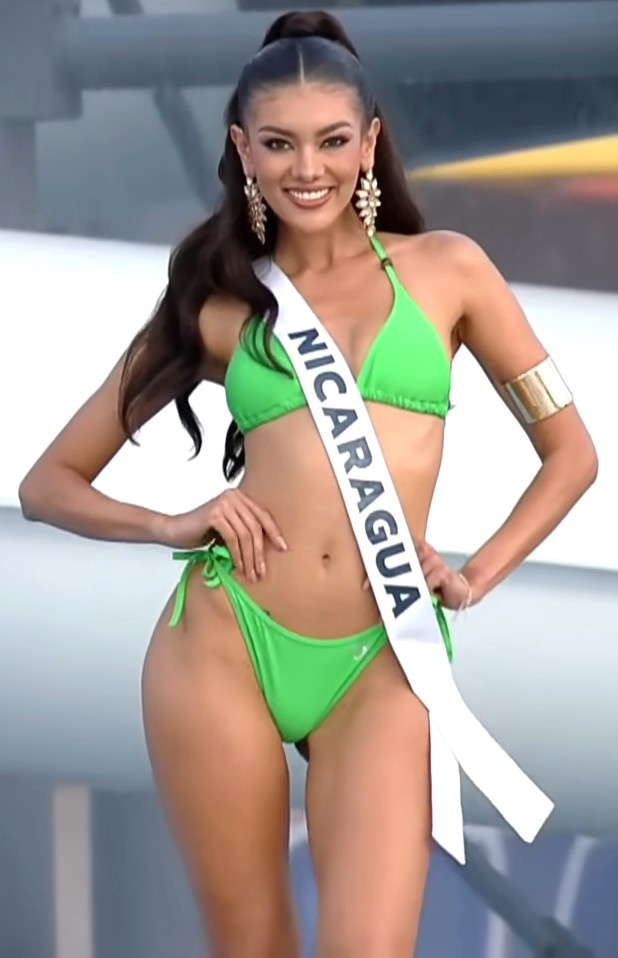
Miss Universe Nicaragua 2025
Itza Castillo

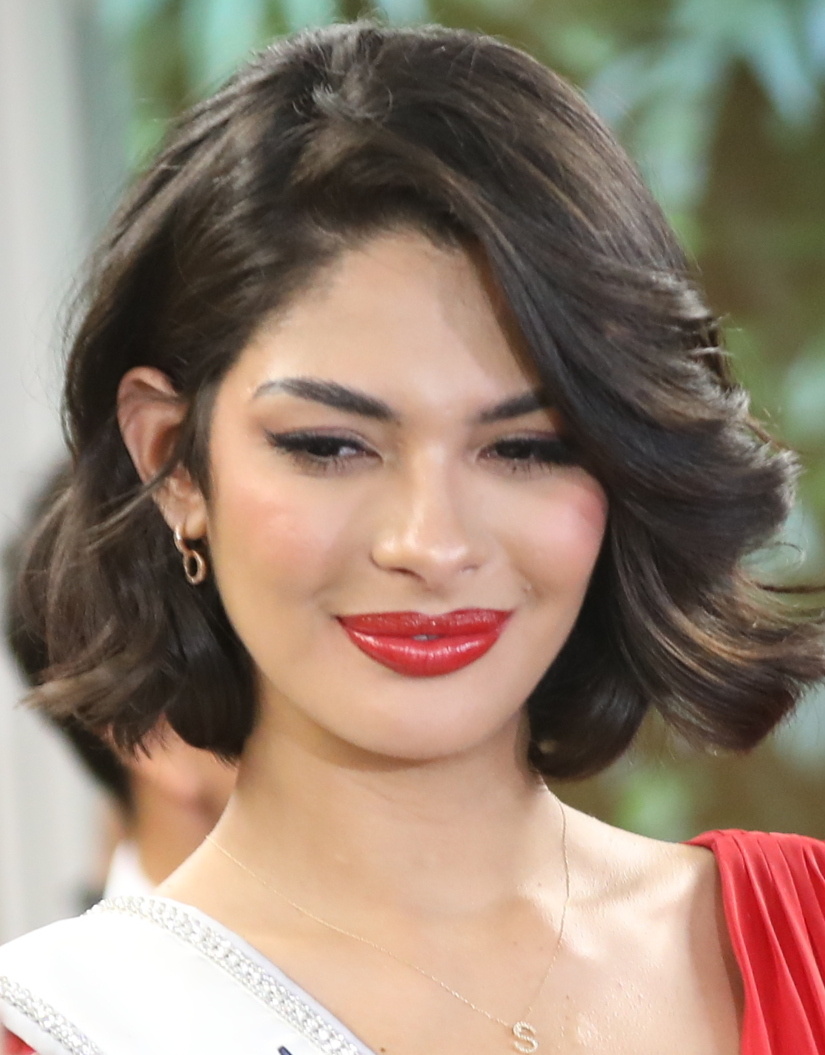
Miss Nicaragua 2023 and Miss Universe 2023
Sheynnis Palacios

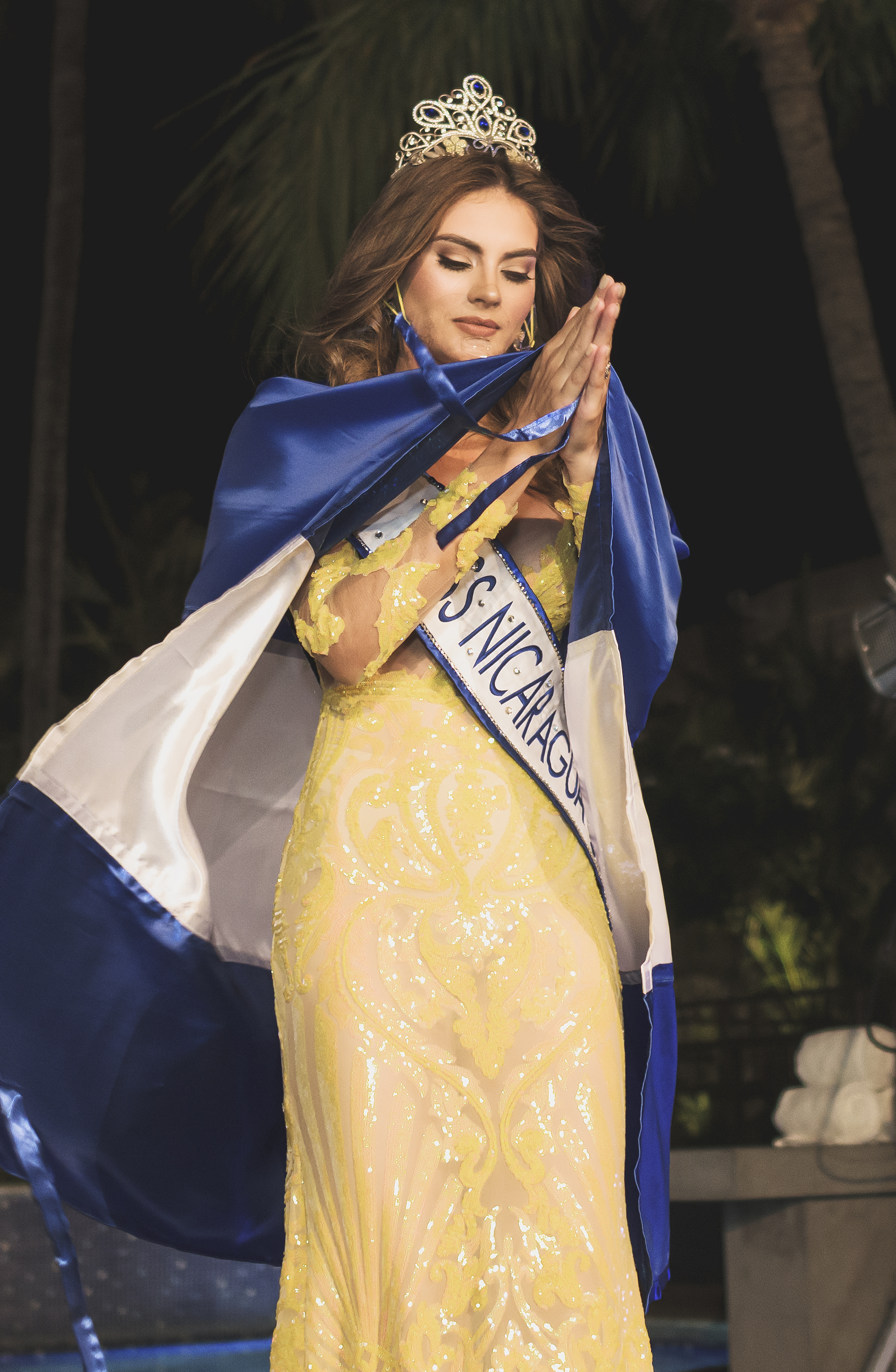
Miss Nicaragua 2020
Ana Marcelo

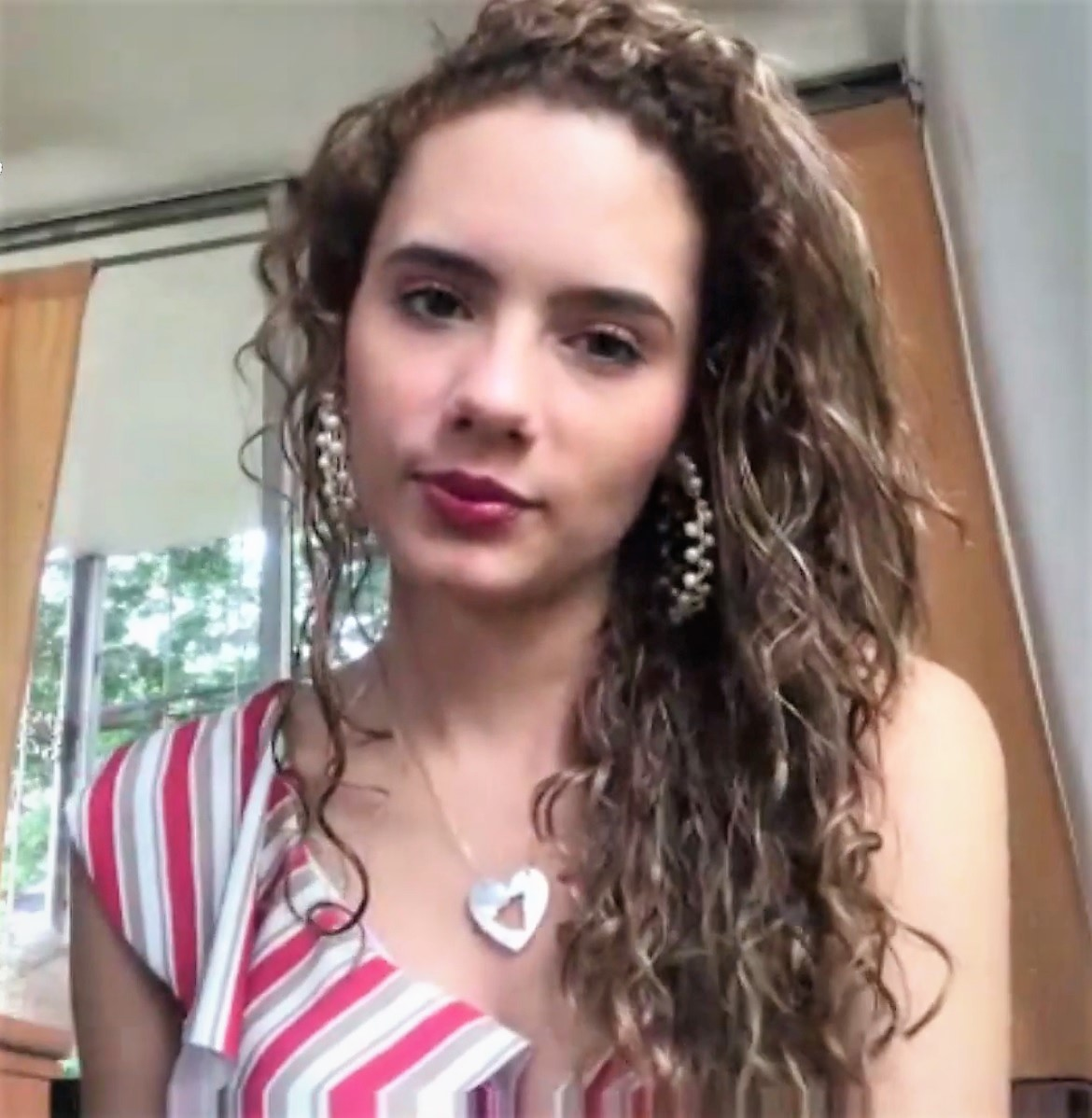
Miss Nicaragua 2019
Inés López

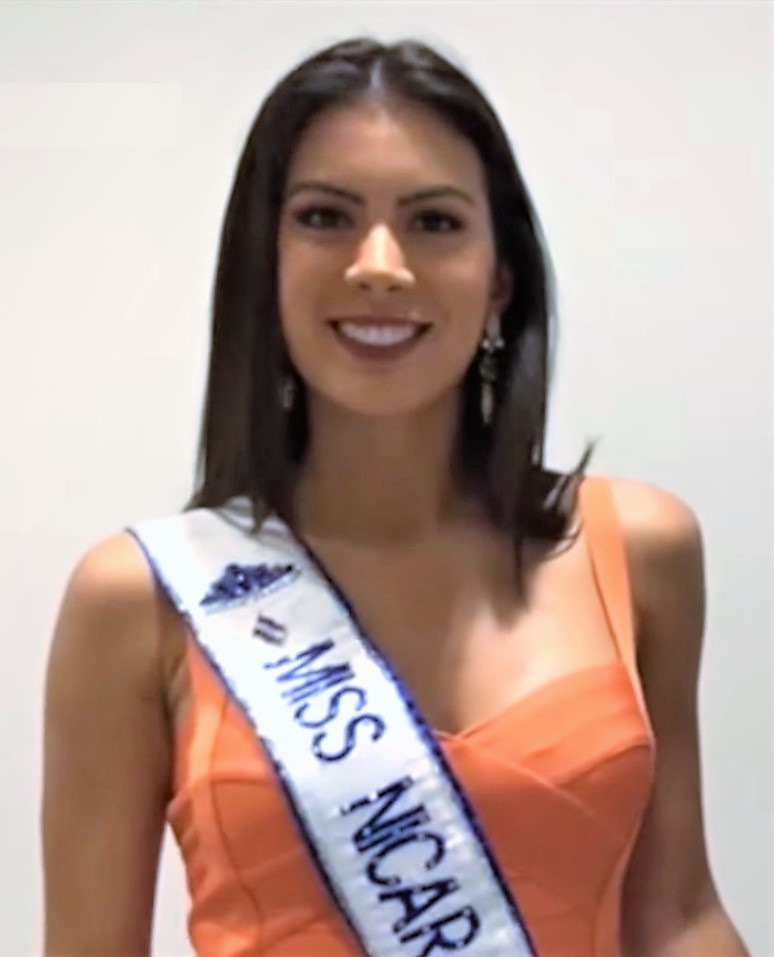
Miss Nicaragua 2018
Adriana Paniagua

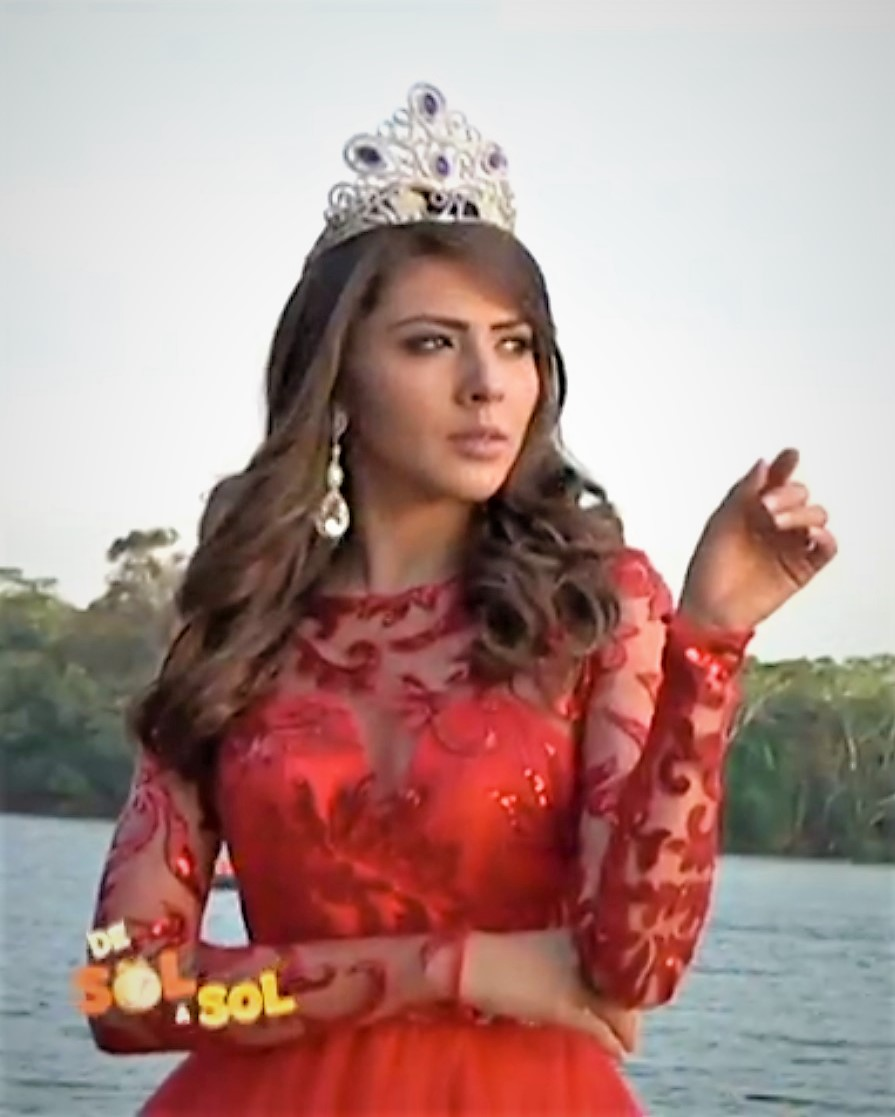
Miss Nicaragua 2017
Berenice Quezada

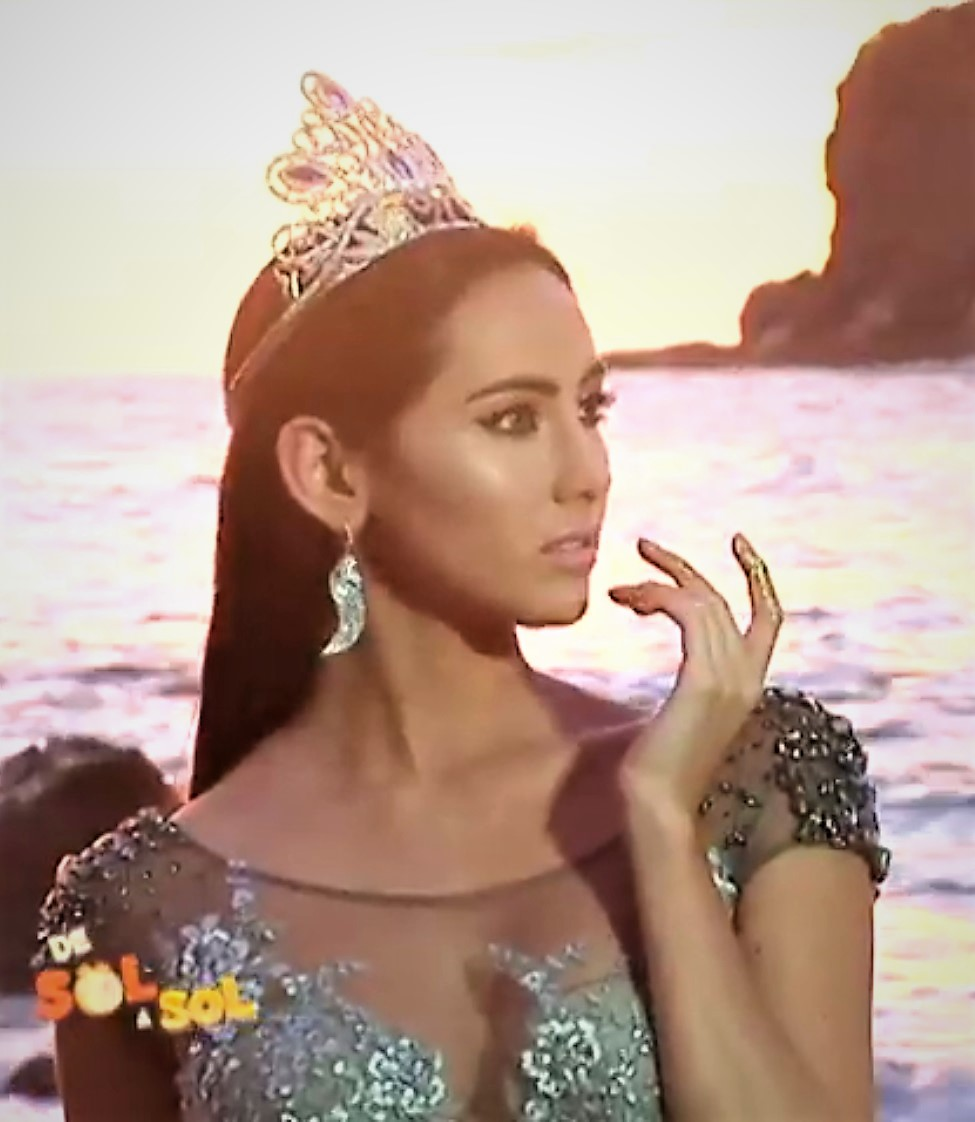
Miss Nicaragua 2016
Marina Jacoby

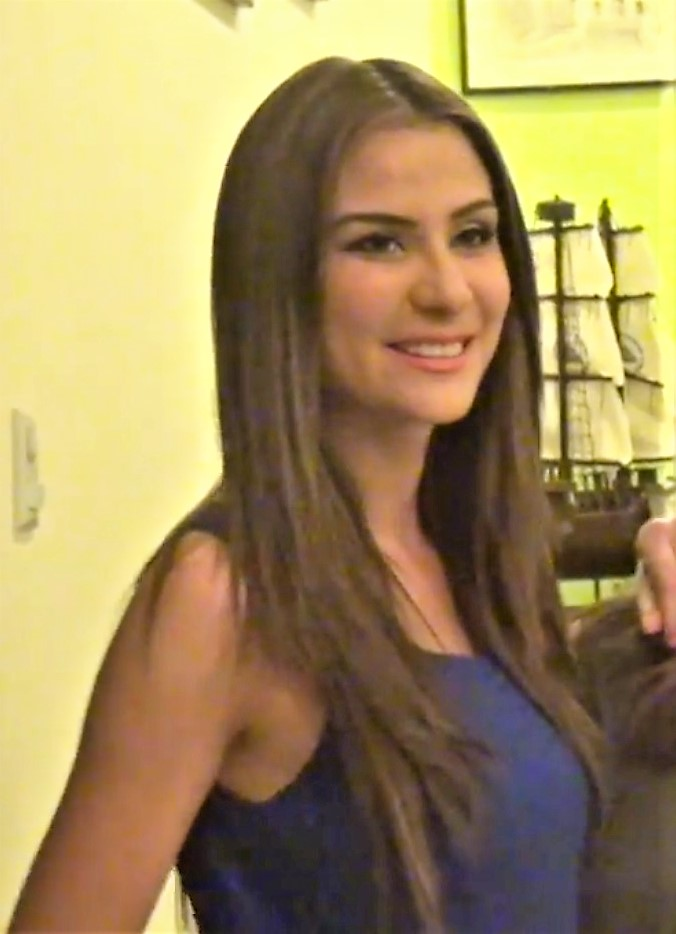
Miss Nicaragua 2015
Daniela Torres

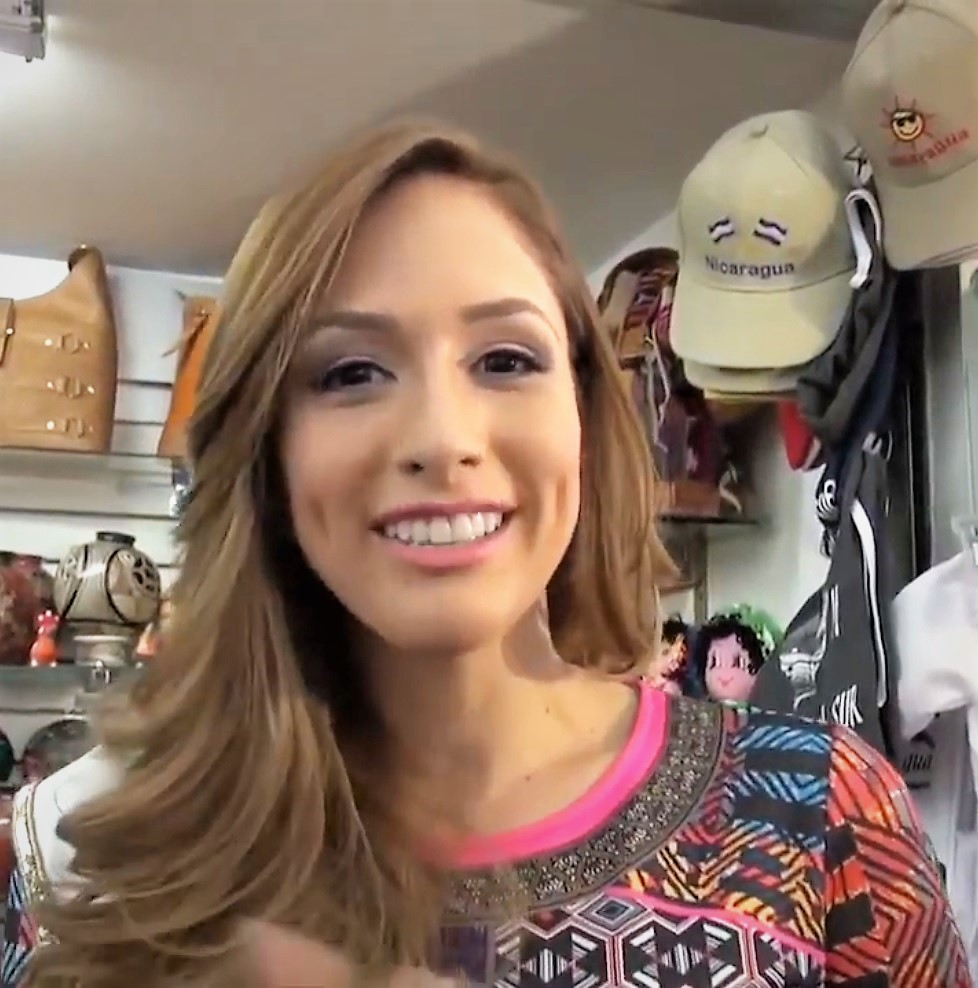
Miss Nicaragua 2014
Marline Barberena

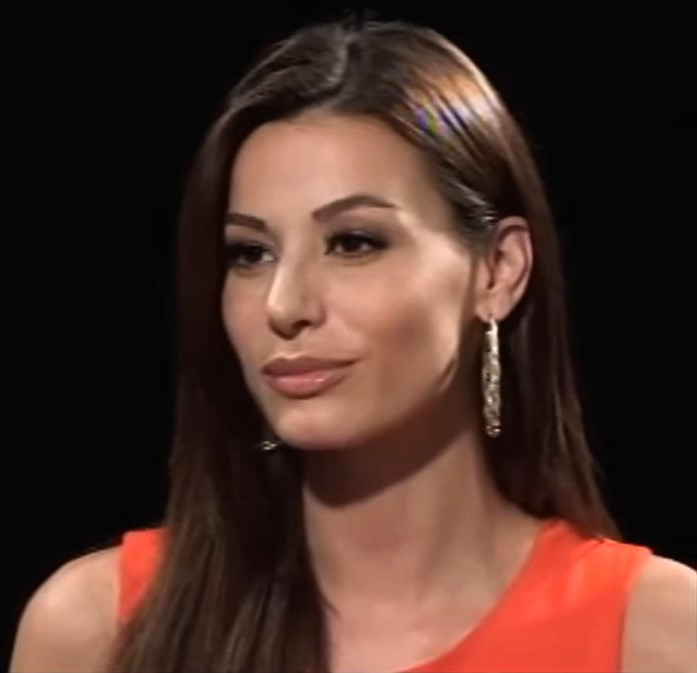
Miss Nicaragua 2013
Nastassja Bolívar

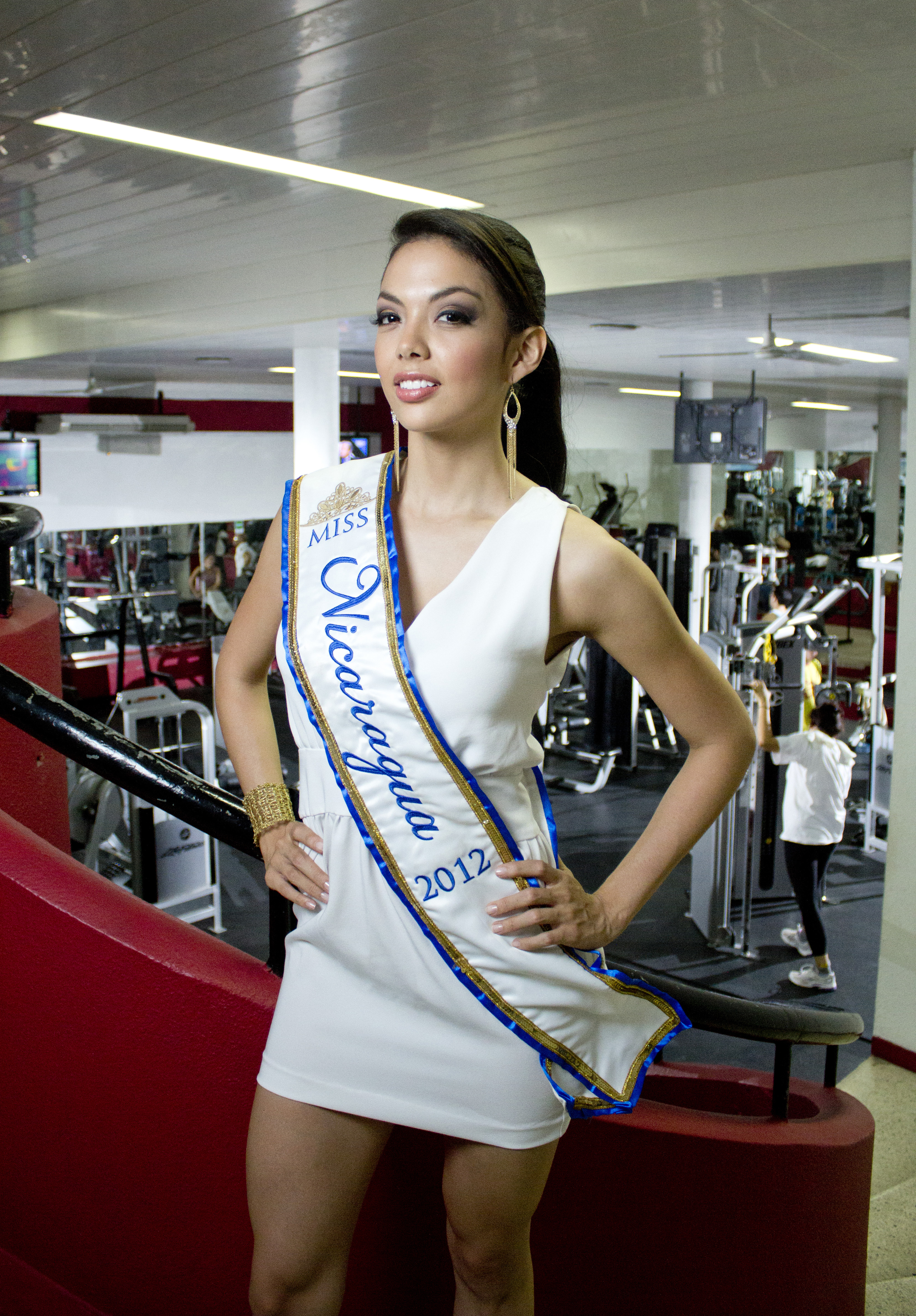
Miss Nicaragua 2012
Farah Eslaquit

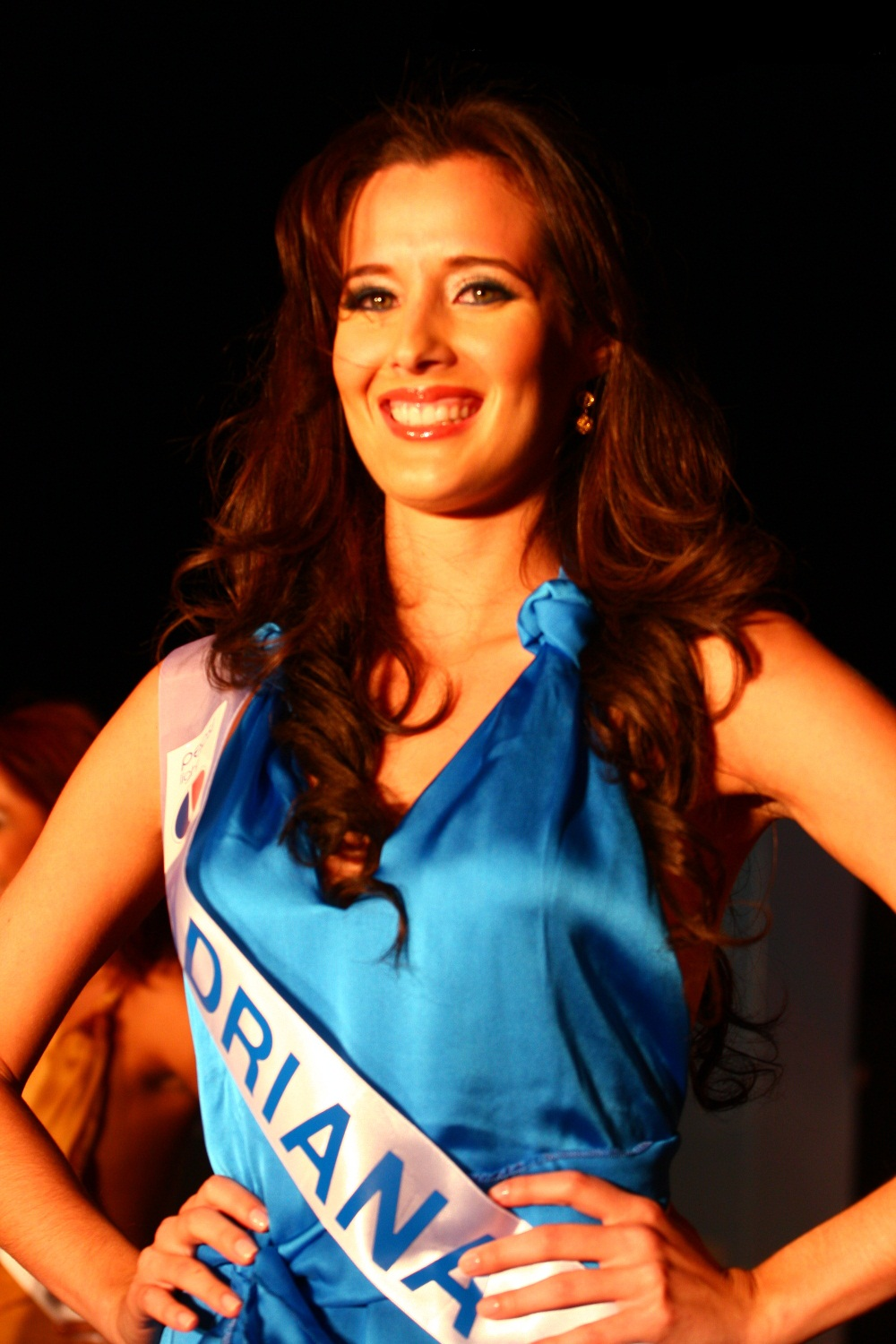
Miss Nicaragua 2011
Adriana Dorn

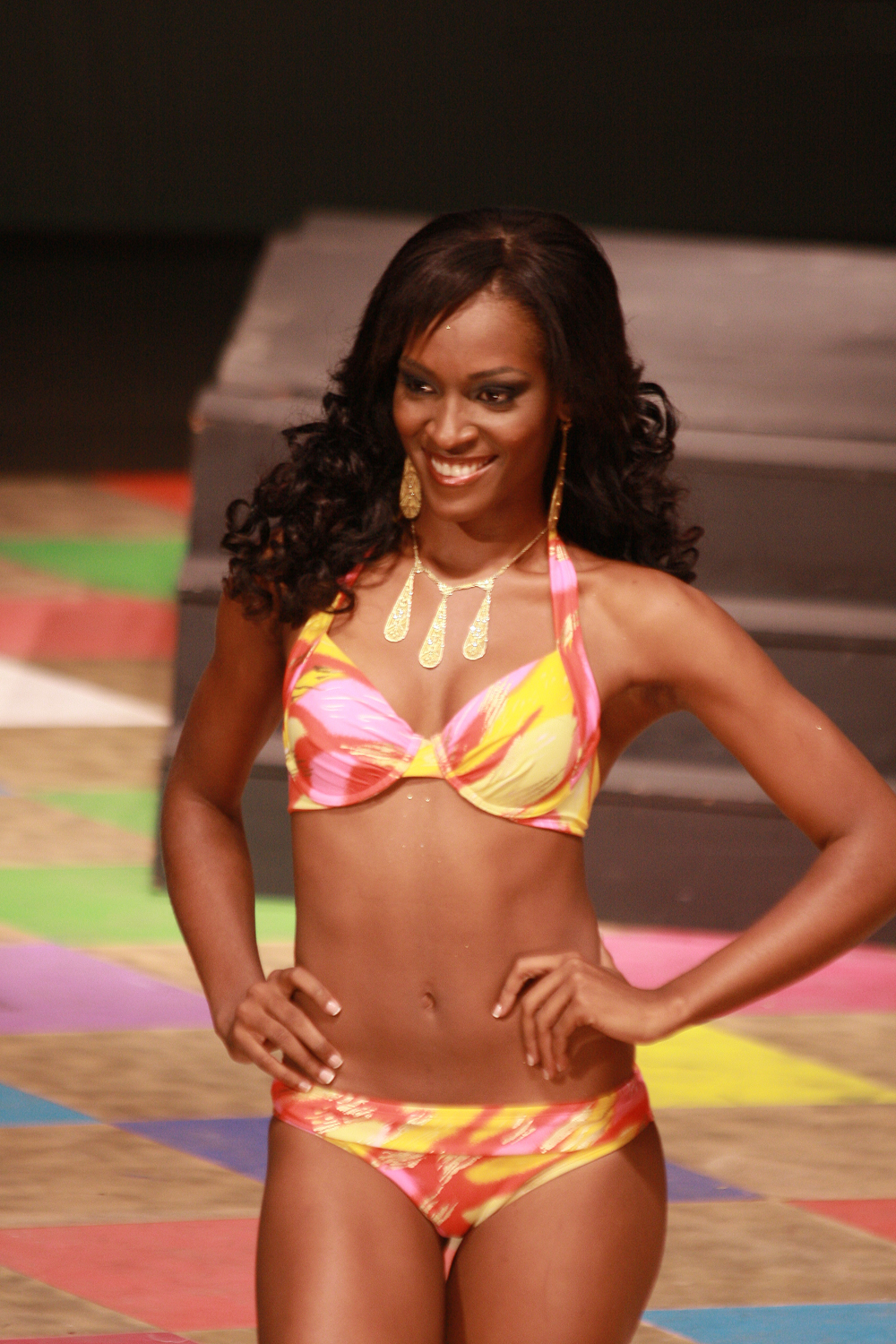
Miss Nicaragua 2010
Scharllette Allen

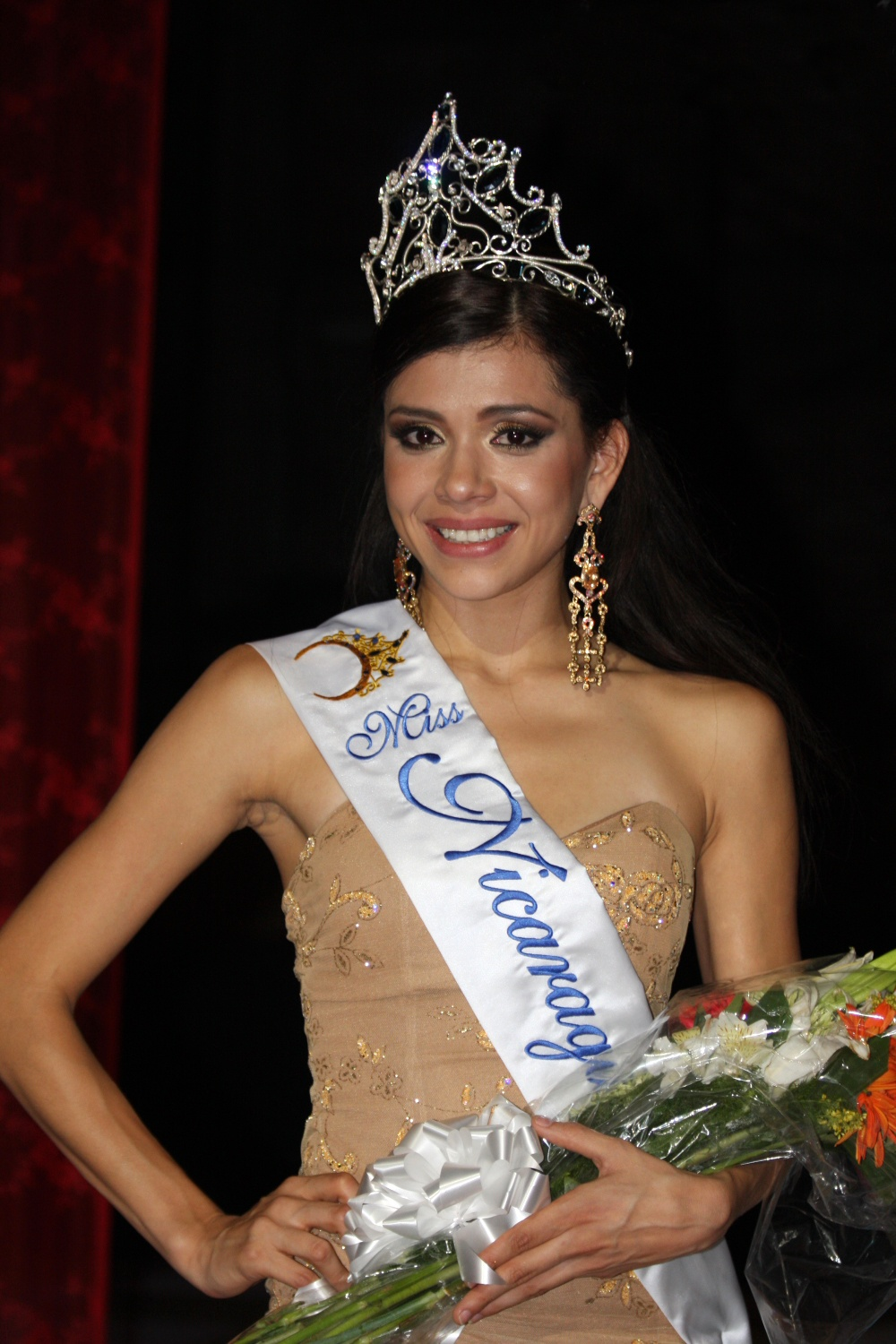
Miss Nicaragua 2009
Indiana Sánchez

Miss Nicaragua 2008
Thelma Rodríguez

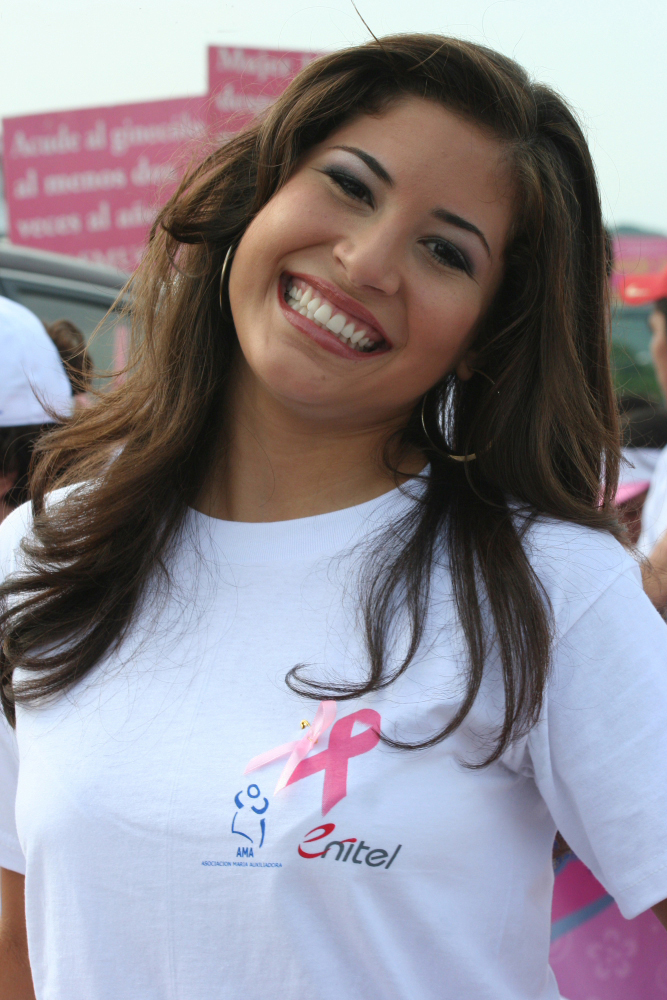
Miss Nicaragua 2007
Xiomara Blandino

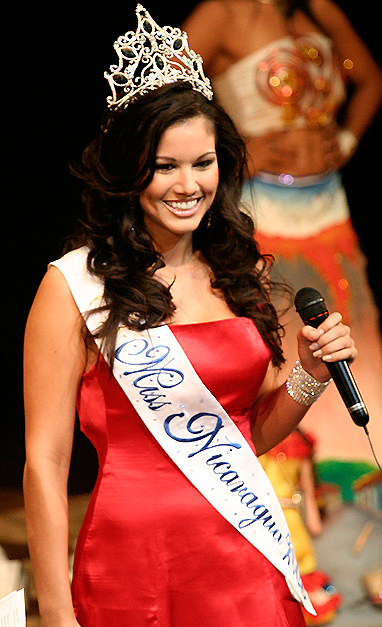
Miss Nicaragua 2006
Cristiana Frixione

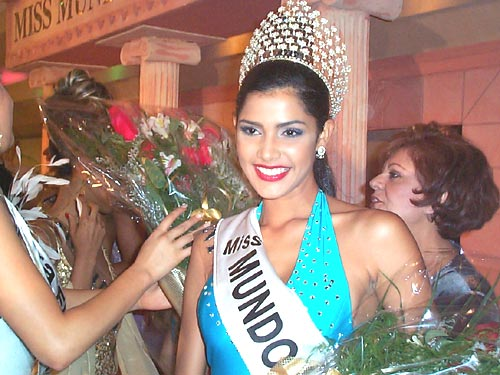
Miss Nicaragua 2002
Marianela Lacayo

=== Regional rankings ===
Department	Titles	Years
Managua	21	1955; 1969; 1971; 1991; 1992; 1995; 1996; 1998; 2001; 2002; 2003; 2004; 2005; 2006; 2007; 2009; 2011; 2015; 2019; 2021; 2025
Carazo	4	1963; 2013; 2022; 2023
Chinandega	3	2008; 2014; 2018
León	3	1970; 1973; 1974
Masaya	3	1975; 1978; 2012
Matagalpa	3	1968; 1976; 2016
Rivas	3	1977; 1979; 1993
South Caribbean Coast	3	2010; 2017; 2026
Chontales	1	2024
Estelí	1	2020
Río San Juan	1	1999

== See also ==
- Miss Mundo Nicaragua
- Miss International Nicaragua
