= Miss Universe Nicaragua 2025 =

- Date: September 4, 2025
- Presenters: Cristiana Somarriba; Iván Taylor; Joe Palacios; Zuleyka Rivera
- Entertainment: Noel Schajris; Hernaldo Zúñiga
- Venue: James L. Knight Center Coliseum, Downtown Miami, Florida, United States
- Entrants: 13
- Placements: 8
- Withdrawals: Diriamba; Granada; La Concordia; Ometepe; Puerto Cabezas; Santa Lucía
- Returns: Boaco; Carazo; Estelí; Jinotega; Masaya; Matagalpa; Nueva Segovia; Rio San Juan; Rivas; South Caribbean Coast
- Winner: Managua; Itza Castillo
- Congeniality: Nueva Segovia; Yarimeth Gutiérrez
- Photogenic: Rivas; Glennys Medina

Miss Universe Nicaragua 2025 was the 1st national pageant to held after 2023 under the previous pageant name Miss Nicaragua which selected the Nicaraguan representative for Miss Universe. This year anniversary pageant was held on September 4, 2025 at the James L. Knight Center Coliseum. This year 13 representatives competed for the pageant at the end of the night Geyssell García Miss Universe Nicaragua 2024 crowned Itza Castillo from Managua as the new Miss Universe Nicaragua 2025; she represented Nicaragua at Miss Universe 2025 in Thailand where she placed among the top 30.

This marked the first national pageant held outside Nicaragua. The final night was hosted by Iván Taylor and Miss Universe 2006 from Puerto Rico Zuleyka Rivera in company with live streaming Joe Palacios and Cristiana Somarriba.

== Results ==
Placement	Delegate
Miss Universe Nicaragua 2025	Managua – Itza Castillo
1st runner-up	Rivas – Glennys Medina
2nd runner-up	Jinotega – Nathalya Pedrozo
3rd runner-up	Boaco – María Fernanda Sequeira
Top 8	Carazo - Francela Aragón; Chinandega – Aleida Pérez; León – Desiree Estrada; Masaya - Massiel Córdoba ¥

- ¥ Winner of popular vote.

=== Historic relevance ===
- Managua won and qualify for the first time since 2021.
- Jinotega qualify the last time in 2019.
- Chinandega qualify the last time in 2023.
- Carazo qualify the last time in 2022.
- Rivas qualify the last time in 2021.
- León qualify for the last time in 2018.
- Masaya qualify for the last time in 2014.
- Boaco qualify for the first time in the pageant history.

=== Special Awards ===
During the final night if Miss Universe Nicaragua the special awards were given to the delegates who made a good effort during the pageant.

Award	National Director
Miss Elegance	Chinandega – Aleida Pérez
Best Body	South Caribbean Coast - Nahomy Hill
Miss Photogenic	Rivas - Glennys Medina
Miss Congeniality	Nueva Segovia - Yarimeth Gutiérrez
Miss Popular Vote	Masaya - Massiel Córdoba

== Contestants ==
13 delegates has been confirmed to compete for the title.

Department (Note: The contestants from the overseas nicaraguan Communities will represent their local hometowns instead)	Contestant	Age (Note: Ages at the time of the competition)	Hometown	Notes
Boaco	María Fernanda Sequeira	18	Boaco	International Brand Model
Carazo	Francela Aragón Lara	28	Jinotepe	Photograph; Previously compete at Miss Teen Nicaragua 2016
Chinandega	Aleida Josefa Pérez	24	Chichigalpa	Previously compete at Miss Cuba 2024; First cuban-nicaraguan to compete in the pageant
Estelí	Lucía Oliveros	23	Estelí	Model
Jinotega	Nathalya Pedroso	23	Jinotega	Compete at Miss Universe Latina 2025; Model
León	Desiree Estrada	33	Poneloya	Actress; Previously compete at Miss Nicaragua 2014
Managua	Itza Castillo	29	Managua	International Model
Masaya	Massiel Córdoba	28	Masaya	International Model
Matagalpa	Stephanie Álvarez	19	Matagalpa	Biological Student
Nueva Segovia	Yarimeth Gutiérrez	20	Nueva Segovia	Communication Student
Rivas	Glennys Medina Segura	30	San Juan del Sur	Miss Grand Nicaragua 2023; Previously compete at Miss Nicaragua 2021; Previously Miss International Costa Rica 2018
Río San Juan	Jhozabeth Centeno	23	Río San Juan	Model
South Caribbean Coast	Nahomy Hill	26	Bluefields	Model

== Notes ==
- Alieska González of Chontales withdrew from the competition for unknown reasons.
- Alexssandra Montalván from Granada withdrew from the competition 3 weeks before the final night.
- Starina Jerez representative from North Caribbean Coast withdraw from the competition due to a familiar deceased.
