= Robert Alter (disambiguation) =

Robert Alter (born 1935) is an American Hebrew and comparative literature scholar.

Robert Alter may also refer to:

- Robert Alter (hotelier) (born 1951), American hotelier
- Rob Alter, bassist, former member of Foghat
