= Miss Universe Nicaragua 2026 =

- Date: September 4, 2026
- Hosts: Carlos Adyan; Ileana Márquez; Joe Palacios
- Entertainment: Luis Pastor
- Venue: InterContinental Miami, Downtown Miami, Florida, United States
- Broadcaster: Emporium TV
- Winner: South Caribbean Coast; Jasmine Blandford

Miss Universe Nicaragua 2026 was the second edition of the newly rebranded Miss Nicaragua pageant, and the 46th edition of the country's national beauty pageant. The historic event held at the InterContinental Miami, on September 4, 2026. The gala was feature in a live-streaming broadcast starting at 7:00 PM Miami time (5:00 PM Nicaragua time). Hosted by Telemundo presenter Carlos Adyan and Miss Venezuela 2023 Ileana Márquez.

The franchise is fully managed by Emporium Agency, a Miami-based talent and entertainment company that assumed official management of the national competition to oversee candidate recruitment, training, and event production.

For the second time in the national pageant’s history, a titleholder will be officially appointed and designated to represent Nicaragua at the Miss Universe 2026 pageant, which is set to be held in Puerto Rico later that year.

At the conclusion of the event, the reigning Itza Castillo crowned as Miss Universe Nicaragua 2026 Jasmine Blandford of the South Caribbean Coast. She will represent Nicaragua at Miss Universe 2026 in Puerto Rico.

== Miss Universe Nicaragua 2026 ==
=== Selection ===
The selection of the representative from Nicaragua for the 75th edition of Miss Universe (to be held in November 24, 2026 in San Juan, Puerto Rico) was characterized by prolonged institutional secrecy, the absence of a traditional competitive pageant, and the subsequent direct appointment of the national queen.

=== Background and Selection Process ===
At the beginning of the search season, the Miss Universe Nicaragua organization announced the opening of independent digital auditions for the 2026 national format through its official web platform. However, following that announcement, the franchise entered a period of public inactivity and absolute media silence, omitting any official statements regarding the status of the applicants or the execution of a live competitive gala.Faced with this lack of clarity, the pageant community and experts (missologists) began to speculate about a potential direct appointment. Among the most prominent names favored by public opinion to assume the title were:

Jasmine Chola Blandford: An internationally established model and one of the most highly acclaimed options by fans.

María Fernanda Sequeira: The second runner-up from the immediate previous edition of Miss Nicaragua.

Mariela Cerros: A well-known figure who previously held the title of Miss World Nicaragua 2021.

Despite the strong momentum behind these profiles, the organization did not finalize any of these alternatives publicly, nor did it issue reports regarding the results of the virtual or in-person casting filters.

=== Official Announcement and Miami Gala ===
On August 25, 2026, breaking the institutional silence, the organization formally announced via its social media platforms that the new Miss Nicaragua had already been elected privately under the appointment modality. The identity of the queen was kept under strict wraps until the official coronation gala.The presentation and coronation event was scheduled for September 4, 2026, at the InterContinental Hotel at Doral in Miami, Florida, to be broadcast worldwide via live streaming. This event marked historical milestones within the Nicaraguan franchise by becoming:The second consecutive edition of the Nicaraguan pageant held outside national territory, due to the sociopolitical context surrounding the administration of the franchise.The second occasion in which the direct appointment method was utilized in the contemporary history of the local organization.

=== Parallelism with the 2024 Edition ===
This format of direct appointment abroad exactly replicated the logistical strategy used in 2024. On that occasion, under a similar juncture, the organization directly appointed Geyssell García—previously recognized as Reina Internacional del Café Nicaragua, second runner-up at Face of Beauty International 2018, and first runner-up at Miss Nicaragua 2020. García made history as the first queen under the newly rebranded franchise management and was officially crowned in Mexico by the reigning Miss Universe at the time, Nicaragua's own Sheynnis Palacios.

== Results ==
During the final night Sheynnis Palacios, Miss Universe 2023 shared a performance we're she shared her experience as Miss Nicaragua 2023.

Placement	Delegate
Miss Universe Nicaragua 2026	South Caribbean Coast – Jasmine Blandford
