= Jasmine Blandford =

American beauty pageant titleholder

- Occupation: Model
- Beauty pageant titleholder
- Title: Miss Universe Nicaragua 2026
- Agency: Wilhelmina Models (Miami); Natural Model Management (Los Angeles)
- Major competitions: Miss Universe 2026; (TBD)

Jasmine Blandford Chola is a Nicaraguan model and beauty pageant titleholder who was appointed Miss Universe Nicaragua 2026. She will represent Nicaragua at Miss Universe 2026. She's of Afro-Nicaraguan descent.

== Modeling career ==
Blandford began her modeling career in Nicaragua before transitioning to the international fashion market. She gained recognition within the industry after signing with major agencies, including Wilhelmina Models in Miami and Natural Model Management in Los Angeles. Throughout her career, she has walked the runways for high-profile events such as Miami Swim Week, showcasing collections for various international designers.

In addition to her runway work, Blandford has appeared in commercial campaigns and editorial spreads. She also ventured into commercial media, appearing as a featured model in a music video alongside international recording artist Sean Paul.

== Pageantry ==
In September 2026, Blandford was appointed Miss Universe Nicaragua 2026, which was held in Miami, Florida, after the regional selection process and finals were relocated outside Nicaragua due to political instability. She succeeded outgoing titleholder Itza Castillo. As the national titleholder, Blandford will represent Nicaragua at the Miss Universe 2026 international competition, which is scheduled to take place in Puerto Rico.

Blandford is the first black woman to earn the title of Miss Universe Nicaragua since Scharllette Allen in 2010.

Awards and achievements
| Preceded by Itza Castillo (Managua) | Miss Universe Nicaragua; 2026 | Incumbent |
