= Robert Alter (hotelier) =

American hotelier and real estate investor

Robert Alan Alter (born March 5, 1951, in New York, NY) is an American hotelier and real estate investor. He is the founder and chairman emeritus of Sunstone Hotel Investors, Inc. (NYSE: SHO), and the current president of Seaview Investors, LLC, a real estate investment management company that operates hotels in Southern California and Colorado.

== Early life ==
Alter attended Cornell University’s School of Hotel Administration in the early 1970s, with the intention of entering the restaurant business after graduating. Instead, Alter ended up taking a position with Quality Inns in Colorado after his graduation in 1973.

== Career ==
Alter made the leap from employee to ownership in 1976 when he and a partner started Mountain Resorts Inc. with the purchase of a single 28-room hotel. Within 10 years, the number of hotels owned by Mountain Resorts had grown to 10 and Alter formed Colorado Hotel Management in order to run them. In the late 1980s, he moved his business to California, where it began operating as Capstone Properties.

=== First IPO ===
In 1995, Alter took the company public. The Capstone name was already in use, so the company became known as Sunstone Hotel Investors Inc. At that time, Sunstone had a total enterprise value of $75 million with revenues of $30 million. Sunstone was a publicly traded REIT for 5 years, from 1995 to 1999. Initially Sunstone operated only in the West, however in 1997, Sunstone purchased Kahler Realty Corp based in Rochester MN, and its 17 hotels for $372 million.

In 1999, Alter joined with New York-based Westbrook Partners LLC to execute a management-led leveraged buyout of Sunstone. The transaction closed in November 1999 with a total valuation of over $900 million. Over the next 5 years, Alter focused on upgrading Sunstone’s portfolio, with an emphasis on the upscale business niche. As a privately owned corporation, Sunstone expanded eastward again with acquisition of 15 hotels from Dallas-based Wyndham Worldwide in 2002. As of 2004, Sunstone owned 77 hotels in 23 states.

In the year 2000 Alter founded Buy Efficient, LLC, an internet-based purchasing management platform with over 900 participating hotels and senior living properties throughout the United States and Canada. Sunstone Hotel Investors became the sole owner of Buy Efficient following a buyout of its joint venture ownership with Strategic Hotels & Resorts. As of 2015, Buy Efficient, LLC operates as a subsidiary of Avendra, LLC.

=== Second IPO ===
In 2004, Sunstone went public once again as Sunstone Hotel Investors Inc., with a total enterprise value of approximately $1.6 billion. The company raised $413 million in the largest Orange County stock debut of that year.

In 2007, Mr. Alter named his replacement as CEO of Sunstone and retained the title of Chairman of the Board of Directors. During Alter’s 22-years as CEO, Sunstone acquired 125 hotel properties with more than 20,000 guest rooms and disposed of 80 hotels.

Robert Alter is founder and current President of Seaview Investors LLC., a privately owned hotel investment company, established in 2006.

=== Board memberships ===
In the Fall of 2009, Alter served as an adjunct member of the faculty at the School of Hotel Administration at Cornell University. He is currently serving on the Dean’s Advisory Board at Cornell.

Mr. Alter also serves as a Board Member of the Chancellor’s Hospitality Industry Advisory Board for California State University He currently serves on the board of the Tejon Ranch company (TRC:NYSE).

== Awards ==
- Ernst & Young Entrepreneur of the Year Award, 1998 Real Estate Award Winner Orange County Region
- Entrepreneurial Award, Orange County Business Journal in 2006
- Leland C. and Mary M. Pillsbury Institute for Hospitality Entrepreneurship award at Cornell University in 2008.

== Personal life ==
Robert Alter married Joni Simpkins in October 2006. Joni Alter is currently VP Sales & Marketing at Seaview Investors. They share four adult children between them.
