= Itza Castillo =

Nicaraguan beauty pageant titleholder

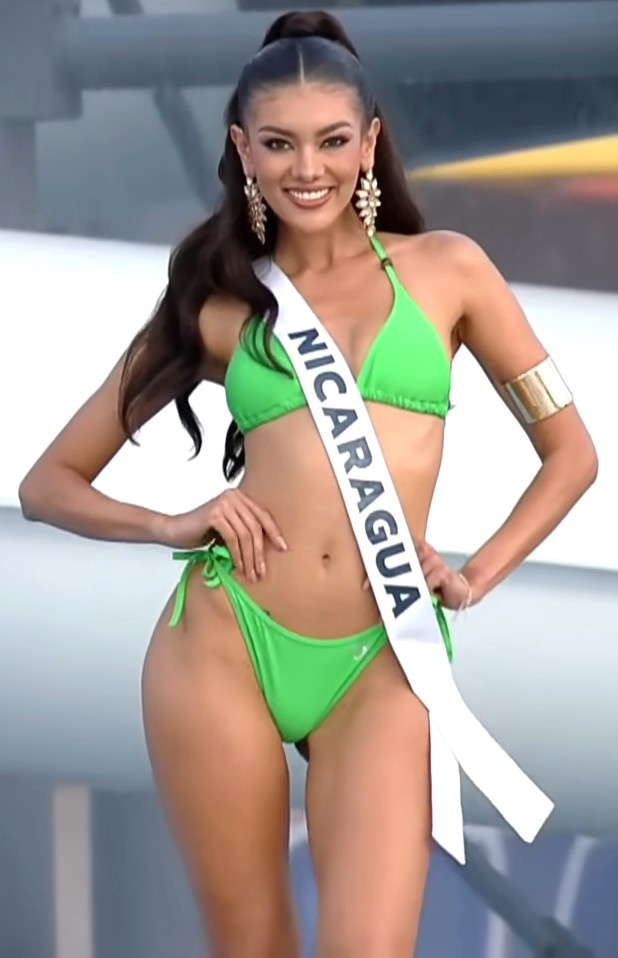
- Castillo in 2025
- Born: 17 August 1995 (age 31); Managua, Nicaragua
- Beauty pageant titleholder
- Title: Miss Universe Nicaragua 2025; (Winner); Miss Universe 2025; (Top 30)

Itza Castillo is a Nicaraguan beauty pageant titleholder, who won Miss Universe Nicaragua 2025. She represented Nicaragua at Miss Universe 2025 in Thailand.

Awards and achievements
Preceded by Geyssell Garcia (Chontales)	Miss Universe Nicaragua; 2025	Succeeded by Jasmine Blandford (South Caribbean Coast)
