= Miss Nicaragua 2021 =

Beauty pageant in Nicaragua

- Date: August 14, 2021
- Presenters: Jose Manuel Espinoza; Ana Marcelo; Valeria Sánchez
- Venue: Holiday Inn Managua - Convention Center, Managua, Nicaragua
- Broadcaster: Vos TV
- Entrants: 6
- Placements: 3
- Debuts: Acoyapa
- Withdrawals: Carazo; Chontales; Costa Caribe Norte; Estelí; León
- Returns: Masaya; Puerto Cabezas; Rivas
- Winner: Allison Wassmer; Managua

Miss Nicaragua 2021 was held on August 14, 2021 at the Holiday Inn Managua - Convention Center in Managua. Ana Marcelo of Estelí crowned her successor Allison Wassmer of Managua at the end of the event.

Wassmer represented Nicaragua at the Miss Universe 2021 pageant in Israel. But she can't qualify in the top 16.

== Results ==
=== Placements ===
Placement	Contestant
Miss Nicaragua 2021	Managua – Allison Wassmer
1st Runner-Up	Rivas – Glennys Medina Segura
2nd Runner-Up	Acoyapa – Zulema Bravo

== Official Contestants ==
6 contestants competed for the title of Miss Nicaragua 2021.

Department	Contestant	Age (Note: Ages at the time of the pageant)	Hometown	Placement	Notes
Acoyapa	Zulema Bravo	26	Acoyapa	2nd Runner Up	
Chinandega	Isabella Salgado	24	Chinandega		
Managua	Allison Wassmer	26	Managua	Miss Nicaragua 2021	
Masaya	Sheryl Artola	25	Masaya		
Rivas	Glennys Medina	28	Rivas	1st Runner Up	previously Miss Guanacaste 2020
RACCN	Schawass Granados	27	Puerto Cabezas		

== Crossovers Notes ==
- Glennys Medina participated in Miss Costa Rica 2020 where she did not qualify and in Miss World Nicaragua 2016.

=== Withdraws ===
- Santo Tomás - Geyssell García
- Chinandega - Katty Davis
