= Zhao Na (model) =

Chinese beauty pageant titleholder

Zhao Na 赵娜
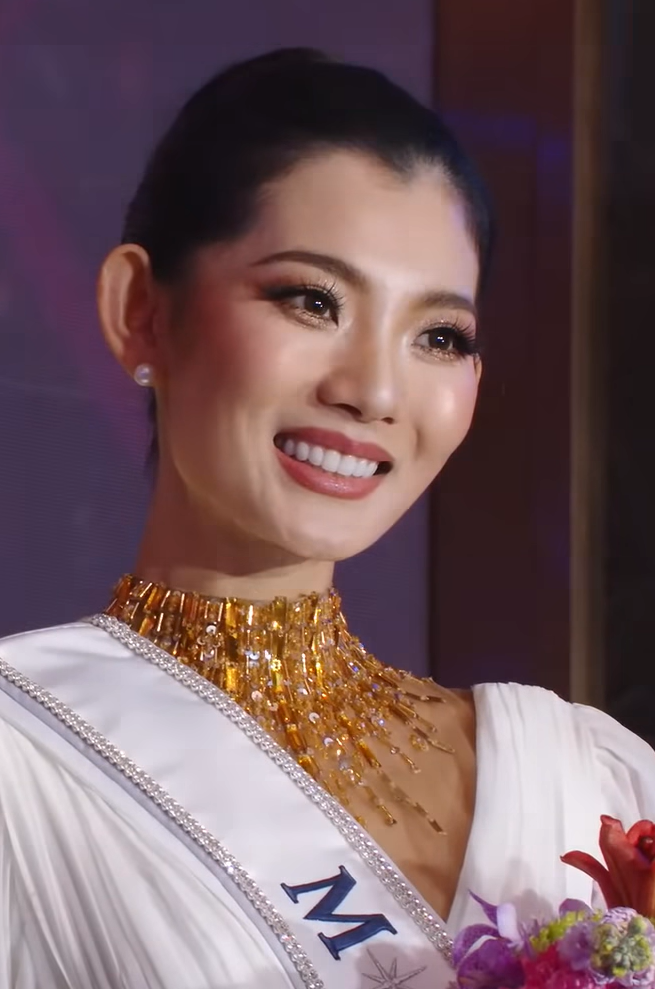
- Zhao in 2025
- Born: Zhao Na; Jinan, Shandong, China
- Education: Shandong Agricultural University; University of Queensland
- Height: 1.83 m (6 ft 0 in)
- Beauty pageant titleholder
- Title: Miss Universe China 2025; Miss Universe Asia 2025
- Major competitions: Miss Universe China 2024 (Winner; Assumed); Miss Universe 2025; (Top 12); (Miss Universe Asia)

Zhao Na (Chinese: 赵娜) is a Chinese beauty pageant titleholder who represented China at Miss Universe 2025, in which she placed in the top 12. She was later named Miss Universe Asia.

== Early life and education ==
Zhao was born and raised in China. Zhao attended Shandong Agricultural University, where she earned a bachelor's degree in finance. Upon completing her undergraduate studies, she relocated to Australia and obtained a Master of Business from the University of Queensland.

Prior to her career in the fashion industry, Zhao worked in the financial sector, specializing in investment research and asset management. She is also a trained musician, proficient in traditional Chinese instruments such as the pipa and guzheng.

== Pageantry ==
=== Miss Universe China 2024 ===
Zhao was first runner-up at Miss Universe China 2024. She later assumed the title after former title holder, Xinying Zhu, was removed by the organization as she was underage.

=== Miss Universe 2025 ===
Zhao represented China at Miss Universe 2025, held in Thailand, and reached the top 12. This marked the second consecutive time that China had reached the semifinals, following Jia Qi's top 30 placement at Miss Universe 2024 in Mexico.

Zhao was later declared Miss Universe Asia during the coronation party, succeeding the inaugural titleholder, Chelsea Manalo of the Philippines.

Awards and achievements
Preceded by (Philippines) Chelsea Manalo	Miss Universe Asia; 2025	Succeeded by Incumbent
Preceded by Sūn Jia Qi	Miss Universe China; 2024	Succeeded by Chen Weiyi
