= Miss Universe Latina, el reality =

2025 American reality show

- Genre: Reality competition; Beauty pageant
- Presented by: Jacqueline Bracamontes
- Judges: Aracely Arámbula; David Salomón; Fabián Ríos
- Country of origin: United States
- Original language: Spanish

Production
- Executive producers: Francisco Suárez; Federico Lariño
- Production company: Telemundo Studios

Original release
- Network: Telemundo
- Release: June 3 – July 21, 2025

Miss Universe Latina, el reality is an American reality television beauty pageant in which thirty contestants compete for the title Miss Universe Latina and represent U.S. Latinas at the 74th Miss Universe pageant. The series premiered on Telemundo on June 3, 2025. On July 21, 2025, Yamilex Hernández from the Dominican Republic was crowned the winner, winning $100,000 in cash as a reward and the title of "Miss Universe Latina".

== Format ==
Thirty contestants live in a mansion and face a series of challenges to show how much potential they have to participate in the 74th Miss Universe pageant. They are divided in two teams led by two former Miss Universe, Alicia Machado and Zuleyka Rivera (later replaced by Andrea Meza), who will advise and guide them based on their own experiences. Machado serves as captain of Team Emerald, while Meza serves as captain of Team Ruby. With the help of the public vote, the judges decide week by week who remains in the competition vying to be named Miss Universe Latina.

== Production ==
In May 2013, Telemundo announced Miss Latina Universe at its upfront for the 2013–2014 television season. The first episode was scheduled to be broadcast on June 15, 2014, on Telemundo and to go on for several weeks, with the winner competing in Miss Universe 2014. Rashel Díaz and Raúl González were set to host. The show was postponed indefinitely on June 9, 2014.

On November 16, 2024, it was announced that Telemundo had revived the series and would premiere in 2025 under the title Miss Universe Latina, el reality. Casting took place from November 2024 to January 2025. On April 22, 2025, Jacqueline Bracamontes was announced as host of the series. On May 12, 2025, Alicia Machado and Zuleyka Rivera were announced as team captains. On May 23, 2025, actress and singer Aracely Arámbula, fashion designer David Salomón and actor Fabián Ríos were announced as judges.

During the June 16 episode, Zuleyka Rivera walked off the set after an argument with the judges. The following day, it was confirmed that Rivera would not be returning to the show. Andrea Meza was announced as her replacement as captain of Team Ruby.

== Incidents ==
In June 2025, former Miss Universe Zuleyka Rivera, captain of Team Rubí on Miss Universe Latina: El Reality, resigned during a live immunity gala. The conflict began when judge David Salomón admonished contestants to be cautious about whose advice they followed, implying that Rivera's leadership might lead to disqualification. Rivera responded heatedly, challenging Salomón by asking if he had ever competed in Miss Universe, and demanded he speak directly if he had concerns, sparking further tension. Feeling her leadership was being unfairly undermined, she stood up mid-show and declared, "I have no work here anymore. Good night. Thank you," before walking off the set. The following day, host Jacky Bracamontes announced that Rivera would no longer serve as captain of Team Rubí, citing her refusal to continue after the judges' remarks. The exit generated polarized reactions: many applauded her for standing by her values and defending her team with dignity and leadership, while others criticized her abrupt departure as unprofessional and leaving her contestants without mentorship.

In July 2025, during the second live challenge of Miss Universe Latina: El Reality, Cuban-American contestant Laura Pérez experienced a public fall on stage. She lost her balance mid-ritua, a dynamic physical challenge filmed live, resulting in a dramatic fall of approximately three metres that prompted on-site medical personnel to immediately assist her. The production team swiftly cancelled the remainder of the challenge over safety concerns and to protect the other contestants. Speculation emerged that the cause may have been faulty safety cables, though Telemundo's production has not issued an official statement on this matter. The incident sparked criticism on social media, with users denouncing the stunt as "unnecessary" and "dangerous" for a beauty pageant format.

== Contestants ==
The contestants were revealed during the premiere episode.

Country/Territory	Contestant	Age	State
Argentina	Natali Rodríguez	27	Florida
Colombia	Daniela Castaño	32	Florida
Colombia	Daniela Londoño	36	Georgia
Colombia	Nathalia Tasama	25	Florida
Cuba	Jelly Gilart	19	Florida
Cuba	Laura Pérez	26	Florida
Dominican Republic	Erelly Martínez	24	New Jersey
Dominican Republic	Erika Marchena	24	Florida
Dominican Republic	Gemmy Quelliz	33	New York
Dominican Republic	Skarxi Marte	22	New York
Dominican Republic	Yamilex Hernández	29	New Jersey
El Salvador	Andrea Aguilar	22	California
Guatemala	Debbie Ruiz	37	California
Honduras	Britthany Marroquín	22	South Carolina
Mexico	Andrea Bazarte	32	Texas
Mexico	Azalia Arredondo	28	Texas
Mexico	Elba Mendoza	26	Texas
Mexico	Giselle Burgos	27	California
Mexico	Lidia Venegas	36	California
Mexico	Marcela Delgado	24	Texas
Mexico	Nitza Valdez	20	Texas
Mexico	Silvia Ledesma	27	California
Nicaragua	Nathalya Pedroso	22	Texas
Puerto Rico	Ediris Joan	29	Iowa
Puerto Rico	Génesis Dávila	34	Florida
Venezuela	Ashley Flete	24	Florida
Venezuela	Isbel Parra	31	California
Venezuela	Joseline Rodríguez	43	Florida
Venezuela	Osmariel Villalobos	36	Florida
Uruguay	Fernanda Sosa	35	Florida

== Contestant progress ==
Legend:

I The contestant won immunity and was safe from elimination.
S The contestant was safe from elimination.
S The contestant was nominated for elimination but was saved by public vote.
N The contestant was nominated for elimination.
E The contestant was eliminated.

Contestant	Team	Elimination Round																				
Contestant	Team	1	2	3	4	5	6	7	8	9	10	11	12	13	14	15	16	17	18	19	Semifinal	Final
Yamilex	Emerald	S	S	S	S	S	S	S	S	S	S	S	S	S	S	N	N	N	N	N	S	Winner
Génesis	Ruby	S	S	S	S	S	S	S	S	S	S	S	S	S	S	N	N	N	N	N	S	1st runner-up
Gemmy	Ruby	S	S	S	S	S	S	S	S	N	S	S	S	S	S	N	N	N	N	N	S	2nd runner-up
Andrea B.	Ruby	S	S	S	S	S	S	S	S	S	S	S	S	S	N	N	N	N	N	N	S	Top 5
Laura	Ruby	S	S	S	S	S	S	S	S	S	S	S	S	S	S	N	N	N	N	N	S	Top 5
Ediris	Emerald	S	S	S	S	S	I	S	S	S	S	N	S	S	S	N	N	N	N	N	S	Top 8
Jelly	Emerald	S	S	S	S	S	S	S	N	S	S	S	S	S	S	N	N	N	N	N	S	Top 8
Osmariel	Ruby	S	S	S	S	S	N	S	S	S	S	S	S	S	S	N	N	N	N	N	S	Top 8
Isbel	Emerald	S	S	S	S	S	S	S	S	S	S	S	N	S	S	N	N	N	N	N	E	
Skarxi	Ruby	S	S	S	S	S	N	S	S	S	S	S	S	S	S	S	N	N	N	N	E	
Natali	Emerald	S	S	S	S	S	S	N	I	S	N	S	N	S	N	N	N	N	N	E		
Ashley	Emerald	S	N	S	S	S	S	S	S	I	S	S	S	N	S	N	N	N	E			
Marcela	Ruby	S	S	S	S	S	S	S	S	S	N	N	S	S	N	N	N	E				
Andrea A.	Ruby	S	S	N	S	S	S	S	N	S	S	S	S	S	S	S	E					
Nitza	Emerald	S	S	S	S	S	S	S	S	S	S	S	S	N	S	E						
Elba	Emerald	S	S	S	S	S	S	S	S	S	I	S	S	S	E							
Azalia	Ruby	S	S	S	S	S	S	S	S	S	S	S	N	E								
Joseline	Ruby	S	S	S	S	S	S	I	S	S	S	S	E									
Britthany	Emerald	S	S	S	S	S	S	S	S	S	S	E										
Nathalia	Ruby	N	S	S	S	S	S	N	S	S	E											
Daniela L.	Emerald	S	S	N	S	S	S	S	S	E												
Erelly	Emerald	S	S	S	S	S	S	S	E													
Lidia	Ruby	S	N	S	S	S	S	E														
Giselle	Emerald	N	S	S	S	S	E															
Silvia	-	S	N	S	S	E																
Debbie	-	N	S	S	E																	
Nathalya	-	S	S	N	E																	
Erika	-	S	S	E																		
Daniela C.	-	S	E																			
Fernanda	-	E																				
