= Four Seasons Hotel Washington, D.C. =

Luxury hotel in Washington, D.C.

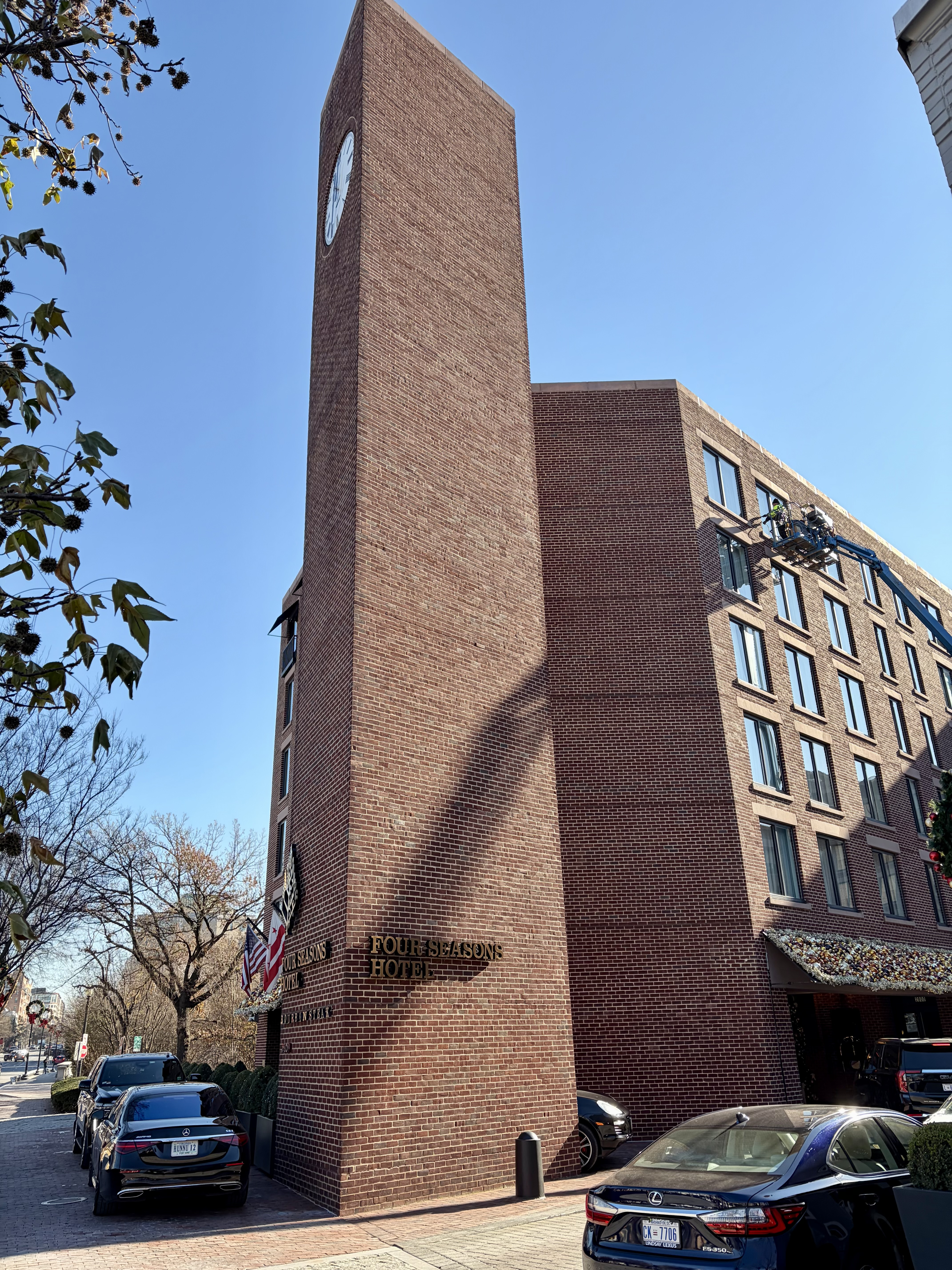
- Interactive map of the Four Seasons Hotel Washington, D.C. area

General information
- Location: United States, Washington, D.C.
- Coordinates: 38.904714°N 77.057229°W
- Opening: October 1979
- Owner: The Blackstone Group

Design and construction
- Architect: David Childs of Skidmore, Owings and Merrill
- Developer: Strategic Hotels & Resorts

Website
- fourseasons.com/washington

The Four Seasons Hotel Washington, D.C. is a luxury hotel located at 2800 Pennsylvania Avenue NW in Georgetown, Washington, D.C.

== About the hotel ==
The 222-room, $21.726 million Four Seasons hotel was designed by architect David Childs of the firm Skidmore, Owings & Merrill. At its opening in 1979, The Washington Post architectural critic Wolf Von Eckardt said the building featured "skillful urban design". But it was marred by poorly laid brick and "phoney" concrete window lintels painted to look like brownstone. He called Childs' idea of making the entrance a campanile "charming", but declared Childs' idea of making the campanile a stand-alone tower "insipid". The hotel's interiors were designed by Frank Nicholson. Rooms featured a great deal of marble and plush carpeting. The furniture was imitation Chippendale, public spaces and guest room features occasionally mimicked Chinese and Japanese artistry, and the color scheme of the hotel was earth tones. There was no hotel lobby. Rather, a concierge behind a standing desk greeted guests.

In 1989, the Four Seasons Hotel won a five-diamond rating from the AAA, the organization's highest ranking.

The Four Seasons underwent a $20 million renovation in 2004. The 200 rooms in the hotel's main structure were closed, and major expansions of the rooms undertaken. The middle room of each three-room block was removed to permit the expansion of the remaining two rooms, with most of the space devoted to expanding each remaining room's bathroom (which now featured custom maple and pear wood cabinets). Room size expanded to an average of 525 square feet (48.8 m^{2}) per room from 325 square feet (30.2 m^{2}). The 60 rooms and suites in the hotel's addition (which were larger than those in the main structure) remained open, as did the hotel's meeting space, restaurant, and spa. The Mobil Guide gave the hotel a five-star rating after the renovation.

Bourbon Steak, the hotel restaurant, is overseen by head chef Michael Mina. The 5,400-square-foot (500 m^{2}) restaurant has a capacity of seating of 144 people and a private dining room which seats 22.

In September 2015, King Salman of Saudi Arabia rented every single room at the Four Seasons Hotel in order to accommodate his entourage while he met with President Barack Obama. The hotel added an extensive amount of gold gilded furniture and laid red carpet in every hallway in order to meet the royal party's tastes. In that same month, Strategic Hotels & Resorts sold itself to The Blackstone Group for $6 billion, giving the Four Seasons its first change in ownership.

== Rating ==
In February 2016, the hotel had a five-star rating from Forbes Travel Guide, and a five-diamond rating from AAA.
