= Miss Universe 2025 =

74th Miss Universe beauty pageant

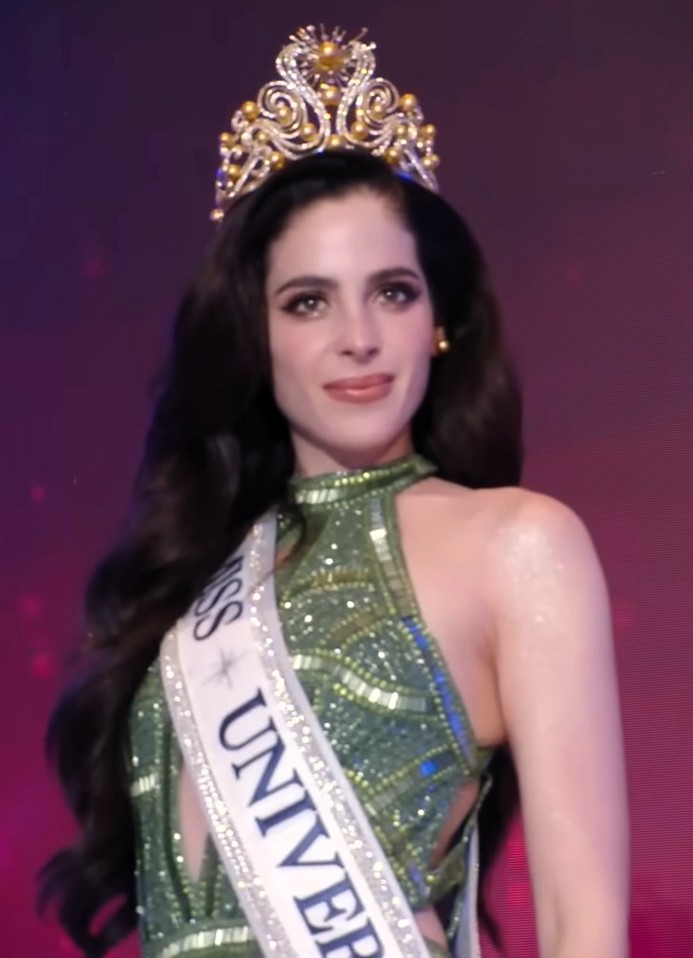
- Fátima Bosch
- Date: 21 November 2025
- Presenters: Steve Byrne; Dayanara Torres; R'Bonney Gabriel
- Entertainment: Jeff Satur
- Theme: The Power of Love
- Venue: Impact Challenger Hall, Pak Kret, Nonthaburi, Thailand
- Broadcaster: Television: Telemundo; Streaming: Peacock; AIS Play
- Entrants: 118
- Placements: 30
- Debuts: Cape Verde; Mayotte; Miss Universe Latina (Note: Non-national delegate competing as the winner of American reality show Miss Universe Latina, el reality.); Palestine; Rwanda
- Withdrawals: Albania; Bahrain; Cameroon; Cyprus; Eritrea; Fiji; Germany; Gibraltar; Iceland; Iran; Jamaica; Kenya; Maldives; Mongolia; Montenegro; North Macedonia; Samoa; Somalia; Suriname; Uzbekistan
- Returns: Ghana; Haiti; Iraq; Kosovo; Panama; Slovenia; South Africa; Sweden
- Winner: Fátima Bosch; Mexico
- Congeniality: Ceren Arslan, Turkey
- Best National Costume: Ahtisa Manalo, Philippines
- Photogenic: Mahyla Roth, Costa Rica

External videos
- Final show
- Preliminary competition

Miss Universe 2025 was the 74th Miss Universe pageant, held at the Impact Challenger Hall in Pak Kret, Nonthaburi, Thailand, on 21 November 2025. The event was presented by American standup comedian and actor Steve Byrne, with Miss Universe 1993 Dayanara Torres and Miss Universe 2022 R'Bonney Gabriel as commentary hosts.

Fátima Bosch of Mexico won the competition, succeeding Victoria Kjær Theilvig of Denmark, marking the fourth time Mexico won the contest. Her runners-up were Praveenar Singh of Thailand, Stephany Abasali of Venezuela, Ahtisa Manalo of the Philippines, and Olivia Yacé of Côte d'Ivoire. Contestants from 118 countries and territories competed in the contest.

The pageant attracted some controversy, including the conduct of Thai pageant organizer, Nawat Itsaragrisil, in pageant events, and legal disputes with the licensee Miss Universe Thailand. A number of judges left the final, including Omar Harfouch, who criticized the selection of the semifinalists and the eventual outcome.

As it was held during the one-year mourning period after the death of Sirikit, the former queen consort of Thailand, some of the pageant's events were modified in accordance to government recommendations.

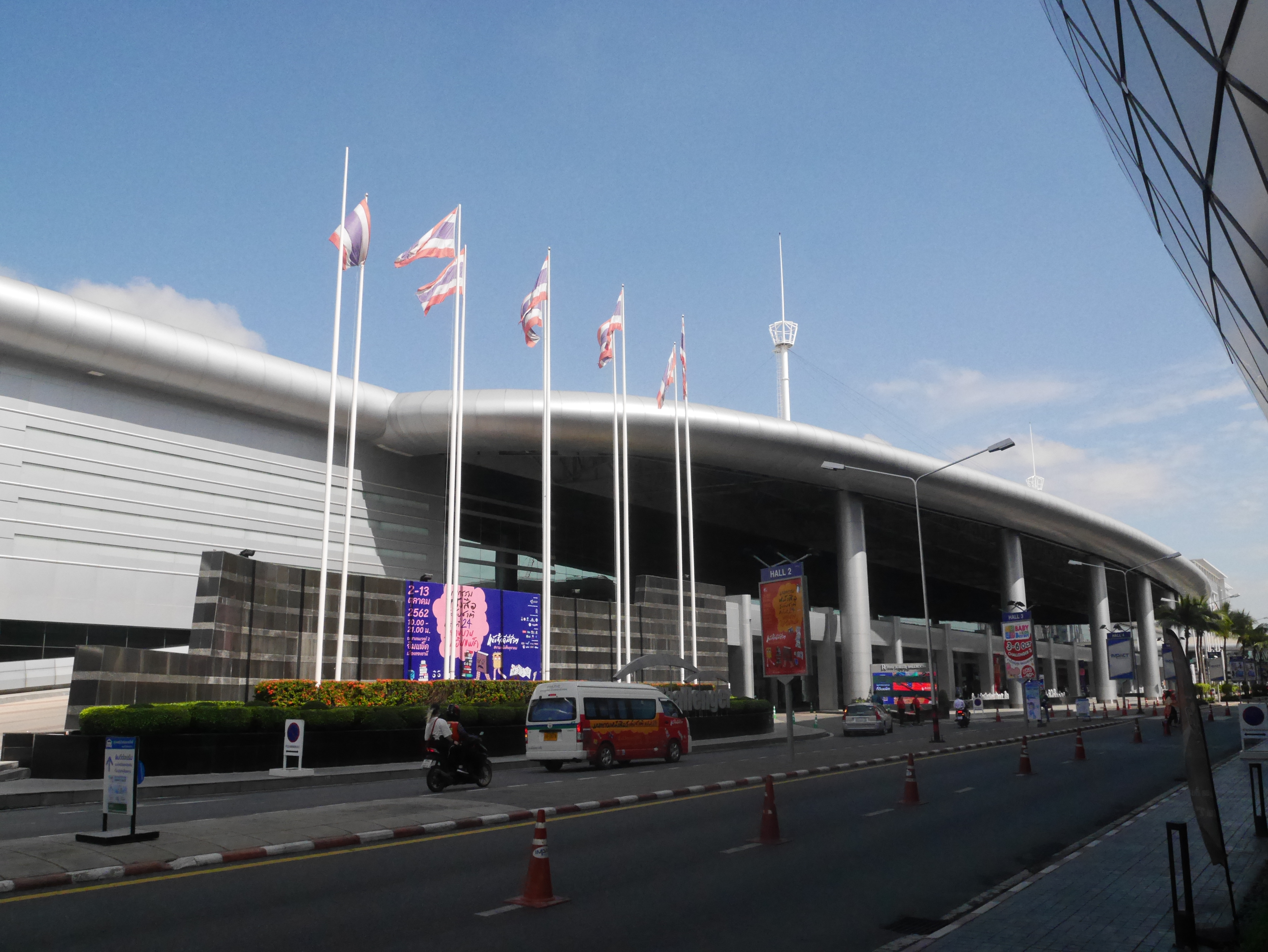
Impact Challenger Hall, the venue of Miss Universe 2025

== Location and date ==
=== Announcement ===
On 16 November 2024, at the Miss Universe 2024 finals, pageant co-owner Raúl Rocha announced that the shortlisted host countries for the 2025 pageant were Argentina, Costa Rica, Dominican Republic, Morocco, India, South Africa, Spain, and Thailand.

The Miss Universe Organization announced Thailand as the host country on 7 February 2025, with the Impact Challenger Hall in Pak Kret, Nonthaburi, as the central venue, and ancillary events scheduled for Bangkok, Phuket and Pattaya. This is the fourth time that Thailand hosted the pageant, and the third time the event will be held in the said venue after the 2005 and 2018 pageants. On 23 April, Thai businessman, Nawat Itsaragrisil became the executive director of the pageant.

On 25 October, Itsaragrisil confirmed that the pageant will proceed as scheduled despite the one-year mourning period declared following the death of Sirikit, the former queen consort of Thailand, the day before. However, the organizers modified the pageant's format and its related activities in accordance with the recommendations of the Thai government to fit the "mourning atmosphere" of the period.

=== Issues with the organizers ===
On 3 November 2025, the Miss Universe Organization stated that a "Special Dinner and Talk Show" event organized by Miss Universe Thailand was not officially authorized and violated MUO's intellectual property rights. Miss Universe Thailand Organization responded that the event and its associated online voting were part of Thailand's official marketing package as the host country, conducted transparently under their authorized rights, and that they had consulted legal advisors to assess potential impacts and prepare for possible legal action if necessary. However, the event was officially canceled on 6 November.

On 3 November 2025, the Metropolitan Police Bureau in Bangkok launched an investigation after Itsaragrisil, the chairman of the Miss Universe Thailand Host Committee, filed a complaint stating that MUO instructed contestants of the 74th Miss Universe pageant to film promotional materials for an online gambling website at their hotel, which may constitute a violation of Thai law. MGI denied any involvement and stated that the promotion was solely the responsibility of MUO. Itsaragrisil gave a statement to the police and formally denied wrongdoing.

== Selection of participants ==
Contestants from 118 countries and territories were selected to compete in the pageant. Among the delegates, two were appointed to compete as the runner-up in their national pageant, (Note: Sarah Bou Jaoude of Lebanon was the first runner-up in Miss Lebanon 2024. Mirna Caballini of Panama was the second runner-up in Miss Universe Panama 2024.) eighteen were chosen through a casting process, (Note: Representatives from Bangladesh, Bulgaria, Cape Verde, Côte d'Ivoire, Denmark, Ghana, Guadeloupe, Haiti, Iraq, Mauritius, Mayotte, Palestine, Paraguay, Rwanda, Serbia, South Africa, Sweden, and Vietnam, were each selected through a casting process conducted by their respective organizations.) while four were selected to replace an original winner.

From June to July 2025, Telemundo aired the reality show Miss Universe Latina, el reality, in the United States, which selected an additional delegate representing Hispanic and Latina Americans in the country, designated as Miss Universe Latina. This addition marked the first time the pageant accepted an entrant not sent by a licensee representing a country nor a territory.

=== Replacements ===
Na Zhao of China and Latifah Morris of Trinidad and Tobago both assumed their national titles after the original winners, Xuhe Hou and Sihlé Letren, respectively, resigned from their roles. Déborah Djema of the Democratic Republic of the Congo, was replaced by Dorcas Dienda, after she refused to sign a contract mandated by the national organization. In Poland, Miss Polski 2025, Oliwia Mikulska was replaced by Emily Reng, a new representative from Miss Polonia.

=== Debuts, returns, and withdrawals ===
This pageant marked the debuts of Cape Verde, Mayotte, Palestine, and Rwanda. The Palestinian debut received heightened media attention due to its timing amid the ongoing Gaza war, which had attracted extensive international discourse among experts and human rights organizations.

Returning countries for this pageant included Iraq and Slovenia, which last competed in 2017; Sweden in 2021; Ghana and Haiti in 2022; and Kosovo, Panama, and South Africa in 2023. The national organizations of Bahrain, Cyprus, Eritrea, Fiji, Gibraltar, Kenya, Maldives, Mongolia, Montenegro, Samoa, Somalia, and Uzbekistan, all failed to appoint a delegate or hold a national competition.

Leading up to the contest, Sahar Biniaz of Iran withdrew from the competition, citing concern for her national director's safety following reports of the director's detention in her country. Meanwhile, Josiane Golonga of Cameroon, Diana Fast of Germany, Zoulahatou Amadou of Niger, Iman Totic of North Macedonia and Chiara Wijntuin of Suriname did not arrive in the host country. Helena O'Connor of Iceland withdrew from the competition due to an illness, while Gabrielle Henry of Jamaica withdrew because of an injury sustained during the preliminary competition. In addition, Flavia Harizaj of Albania did not appear in the final competition.

== Results ==
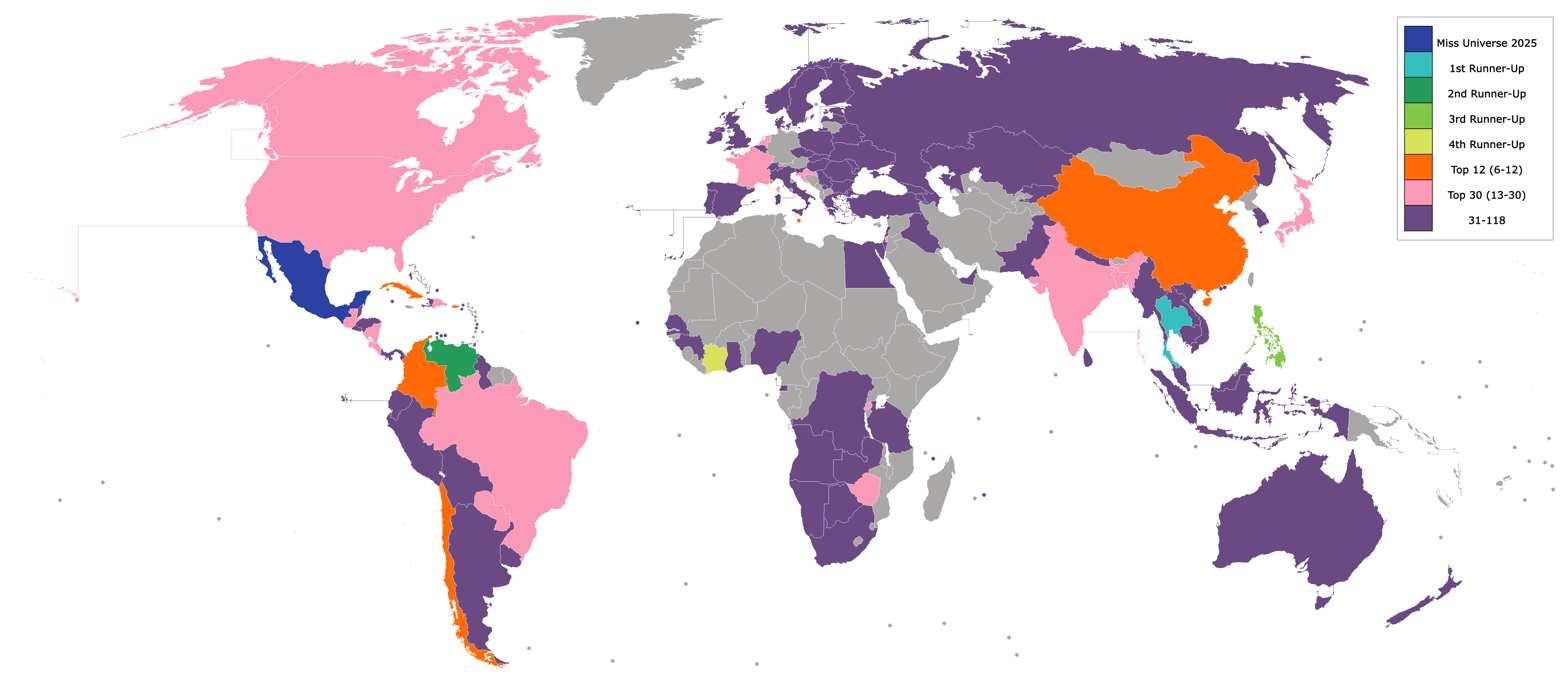
Miss Universe 2025 participating countries and territories

=== Placements ===
Placement	Contestant
Miss Universe 2025	Mexico – Fátima Bosch
1st Runner-Up	Thailand – Praveenar Singh
2nd Runner-Up	Venezuela – Stephany Abasali
3rd Runner-Up	Philippines – Ahtisa Manalo
4th Runner-Up	Côte d'Ivoire – Olivia Yacé
Top 12	Chile – Inna Moll; China – Na Zhao; Colombia – Vanessa Pulgarín; Cuba – Lina Luaces; Guadeloupe – Ophély Mézino; Malta – Julia Cluett; Puerto Rico – Zashely Alicea
Top 30	Bangladesh – Tangia Methila; Brazil – Gabriela Lacerda; Canada – Jaime VandenBerg; Costa Rica – Mahyla Roth; Croatia – Laura Gnjatović; Dominican Republic – Jennifer Ventura; France – Ève Gilles; Guatemala – Raschel Paz; India – Manika Vishwakarma; Japan – Kaori Hashimoto; Miss Universe Latina – Yamilex Hernández; Netherlands – Nathalie Mogbelzada; Nicaragua – Itza Castillo; Palestine – Nadeen Ayoub; Paraguay – Yanina Gómez §; Rwanda – Solange Keita; United States – Audrey Eckert; Zimbabwe – Lyshanda Moyas

§ – Voted into the Top 30 by viewers and awarded as People's Choice.

=== Continental Queens ===
On 24 November, Olivia Yacé of Côte d'Ivoire resigned her title as the continental queen of Africa and Oceania for personal reasons.

Continental Group	Contestant
Africa & Oceania	Côte d'Ivoire – Olivia Yacé (Resigned)
Asia	China – Na Zhao
Europe & Middle East	Malta – Julia Cluett
Americas	Venezuela – Stephany Abasali

==== Special awards ====
Award	Contestant
Best Skin Award	Indonesia – Sanly Liu
Best in National Costume	Philippines – Ahtisa Manalo
Miss Congeniality	Turkey – Ceren Arslan
Miss Photogenic	Costa Rica – Mahyla Roth
People's Choice Award	Paraguay – Yanina Gómez

Award	National Director
Best National Pageant	Miss Universe Philippines – Jonas Gaffud

==== Beyond the Crown ====
Placement	Contestant
First Place	Paraguay – Yanina Gómez
Second Place	Netherlands – Nathalie Mogbelzada
Third Place	Philippines – Ahtisa Manalo

== Pageant ==
=== Format ===
Following the same format as Miss Universe 2024, 30 semifinalists were chosen through the preliminary competition, composed of the national costume presentation, swimsuit and evening gown competitions, and closed-door interviews. Pageant co-owner Raúl Rocha, who affirmed the continuation of the format, stated that it aims to ensure "fairness and transparency" in evaluating all contestants. The initial group of semifinalists will then compete in the swimsuit segment, from which twelve contestants will progress to the evening gown competition. Subsequently, five contestants will advance to the selection committee question-and-answer round. After which, three contestants will advance to final question-and-answer round, after which the winner and her two runner ups will be determined.

The winners of eight special awards and their runners-up were determined through online public voting through the Miss Universe and Zetrix mobile applications. With the Miss Congeniality award also contested in the polls, this contest was the first time the winner of the award was decided through a public vote rather than a customary peer vote among the delegates.

=== Selection committee ===
- Minnie Baloyi — Zimbabwean army colonel (as a finals judge only)
- Ismael Cala — Cuban journalist, author, and speaker
- Sharon Fonseca — Venezuelan model, actress and entrepreneur
- Natalie Glebova — Miss Universe 2005 from Canada
- Louie Heredia — Filipino singer and television presenter
- Andrea Meza — Miss Universe 2020 from Mexico
- Saina Nehwal — Indian badminton player, bronze medalist at the 2012 Summer Olympics (as a finals judge only)
- Savinee Pakaranang — Miss Thailand 1984 (as a preliminary judge only)
- Chalida Thaochalee — Actress and Miss Thailand 1998
- Farung Yuthithum — Miss Thailand Universe 2007 (as a preliminary judge only)

=== Broadcast ===
With the theme "The Power of Love", the pageant aired on 21 November 2025 on the American Spanish-language TV network Telemundo. The program was also made available for streaming on Peacock and AIS Play. American stand-up comedian and actor Steve Byrne served as the presenter with former titleholders Dayanara Torres and R'Bonney Gabriel providing commentary for the event. Thai musician Jeff Satur performed in the event.

=== Incidents during the preliminary competition ===
Gabrielle Henry of Jamaica fell through an unguarded opening in the stage floor during the preliminary evening gown round on 19 November 2025 suffering significant injuries. She was admitted to intensive care in Bangkok, forcing her withdrawal from the competition. The Miss Universe Organization assumed full and immediate responsibility for the incident and covered all associated medical and repatriation costs.

== Contestants ==
118 contestants competed for the title:

Country/Territory	Contestant	Age (Note: Ages at the time of the pageant)	Hometown	Ref.
Angola	Maria Cunha	22	Maianga	
Argentina	Aldana Masset	25	Valle María	
Armenia	Peggy Garabekian	30	Los Angeles	
Aruba	Hannah Arends	28	Savaneta	
Australia	Lexie Brant	21	Brisbane	
Bahamas	Maliqué Bowe	25	Grand Bahama	
Bangladesh	Tangia Methila	33	Dhaka	
Belarus	Alena Kucheruk	18	Polotsk	
Belgium	Karen Jansen	24	Limburg	
Belize	Isabella Zabaneh	21	Independence	
Bolivia	Yessica Hausermann	25	Magdalena	
Bonaire	Nicole Peiliker	42	Kralendijk	
Botswana	Lillian Andries	31	Ramotswa	
Brazil	Gabriela Lacerda	24	Teresina	
British Virgin Islands	Olivia Freeman	22	Paraquita Bay	
Bulgaria	Gaby Guha	26	Marseille	
Cambodia	Nearysocheata Thai	30	Phnom Penh	
Canada	Jaime VandenBerg	29	Coaldale	
Cape Verde	Prissy Gomes	32	Tarrafal	
Cayman Islands	Tahiti Seymour	22	Bodden Town	
Chile	Inna Moll	28	Vitacura	
China	Na Zhao	20	Shandong	
Colombia	Vanessa Pulgarín	34	Medellín	
Costa Rica	Mahyla Roth	26	Cahuita	
Côte d'Ivoire	Olivia Yacé	27	Yamoussoukro	
Croatia	Laura Gnjatović	23	Zadar	
Cuba	Lina Luaces	23	Miami	
Curaçao	Camille Thomas	26	Willemstad	
Czech Republic	Michaela Tomanová	27	Prague	
Democratic Republic of the Congo	Dorcas Dienda Kasinde	31	Kinshasa	
Denmark	Monique Sonne	21	Copenhagen	
Dominican Republic	Jennifer Ventura	27	Barahona	
Ecuador	Nadia Mejía	29	Diamond Bar	
Egypt	Sabrina Maged	23	Chișinău	
El Salvador	Giulia Zanoni	20	La Unión	
Equatorial Guinea	Carmen Obama	19	Mongomo	
Estonia	Brigitta Schaback	28	Tallinn	
Finland	Sarah Dzafce	22	Helsinki	
France	Ève Gilles	22	Quaëdypre	
Ghana	Andromeda Peters	37	Springfield	
Great Britain	Danielle Latimer	37	Barry	
Greece	Mary Chatzipavlou	31	Elefsina	
Guadeloupe	Ophély Mézino	26	Morne-à-l'Eau	
Guatemala	Raschel Paz	25	Guatemala City	
Guinea	Tiguidanké Bérété	24	Conakry	
Guyana	Chandini Baljor	23	Georgetown	
Haiti	Melissa Sapini	22	North Attleboro	
Honduras	Alejandra Fuentes	31	Olancho	
Hong Kong	Lizzie Li	27	Hong Kong	
Hungary	Kincső Dezsényi	22	Budapest	
India	Manika Vishwakarma	22	Sri Ganganagar	
Indonesia	Sanly Liu	29	Denpasar	
Iraq	Hanin Al Qoreishy	29	Houston	
Ireland	Aadya Srivastava	19	Headford	
Israel	Melanie Shiraz	26	Caesarea	
Italy	Lucilla Nori	26	Anzio	
Japan	Kaori Hashimoto	22	Tochigi	
Kazakhstan	Dana Almassova	20	Kostanay	
Kosovo	Dorea Shala	18	Lincoln	
Kyrgyzstan	Mary Kuvakova	19	Bishkek	
Laos	Lattana Munvilay	31	Salavan	
Latvia	Meldra Rosenberg	23	Riga	
Lebanon	Sarah Bou Jaoude	20	Jdeideh	
Macau	Kristen Feng	23	Macau	
Malaysia	Chloe Lim	27	Kuala Lumpur	
Malta	Julia Cluett	27	Floriana	
Martinique	Célya Abatucci	31	Schœlcher	
Mauritius	Aurélie Alcindor	31	Saint Pierre	
Mayotte	Nourya Aboutoihi	25	Mtsapéré	
Mexico	Fátima Bosch	25	Teapa	
Miss Universe Latina	Yamilex Hernández	29	Perth Amboy	
Moldova	Mariana Ignat	24	Chișinău	
Myanmar	Myat Yadanar Soe	27	Ywangan	
Namibia	Johanna Swartbooi	28	Vaalgras	
Nepal	Sanya Adhikari	24	Kathmandu	
Netherlands	Nathalie Mogbelzada	28	Amsterdam	
New Zealand	Abby Sturgin	28	West Auckland	
Nicaragua	Itza Castillo	30	Managua	
Nigeria	Onyinyechi Basil	25	Oworonshoki	
Norway	Leonora Lysglimt-Rødland	19	Nordstrand	
Pakistan	Roma Riaz	25	Lahore	
Palestine	Nadeen Ayoub	30	Ramallah	
Panama	Mirna Caballini	22	Chiriquí	
Paraguay	Yanina Gómez	28	Asunción	
Peru	Karla Bacigalupo	33	Lima	
Philippines	Ahtisa Manalo	28	Candelaria	
Poland	Emily Reng	19	Chicago	
Portugal	Camila Vitorino	26	Setúbal	
Puerto Rico	Zashely Alicea	26	San Juan	
Romania	Cătălina Jacob	28	Bacău	
Russia	Anastasia Venza	22	Reutov	
Rwanda	Solange Keita	44	Kigali	
Saint Lucia	Shianne Smith	21	Micoud	
Senegal	Camilla Diagne	26	Dakar	
Serbia	Jelena Egorova	28	Sakha Republic	
Singapore	Annika Sager	25	Singapore	
Slovakia	Viktória Güllová	20	Bratislava	
Slovenia	Hana Klaut	29	Šempeter	
South Africa	Melissa Nayimuli	29	Butterworth	
South Korea	Soo-yeon Lee	30	Gyeongbuk	
Spain	Andrea Valero	28	A Coruña	
Sri Lanka	Lihasha White	27	Colombo	
Sweden	Daniella Lundqvist	26	Kalmar	
Switzerland	Naima Acosta	20	Ticino	
Tanzania	Naisae Yona	28	Dar es Salaam	
Thailand	Praveenar Singh	29	Chiang Mai	
Trinidad and Tobago	Latifah Morris	32	Chaguanas East	
Turkey	Ceren Arslan	26	Istanbul	
Turks and Caicos Islands	Bereniece Dickenson	22	Salt Cay	
Ukraine	Sofiya Tkachuk	26	Rivne	
United Arab Emirates	Mariam Mohamed	26	Dubai	
United States	Audrey Eckert	23	Lincoln	
United States Virgin Islands	Britanny Robinson	33	Northside	
Uruguay	Valeria Baladan	24	Montevideo	
Venezuela	Stephany Abasali	25	Ciudad Guayana	
Vietnam	Hương Giang Nguyễn	33	Hanoi	
Zambia	Kunda Mwamulima	29	Kalulushi	
Zimbabwe	Lyshanda Moyas	27	Gweru	

== Controversies ==
=== Sash ceremony walkout ===
On 4 November 2025, during the sash ceremony event, Itsaragrisil reprimanded Mexico's Fátima Bosch for not participating in promotional events, implied her actions made her "dumb", and had her escorted out by security after she attempted to interrupt. Several other contestants walked out in solidarity. The reigning titleholder, Victoria Theilvig, also left the venue and said that Itsaragrisil's words had been "beyond disrespectful". Miss Universe owner Raúl Rocha later condemned Itsaragrisil's conduct as unacceptable, ordered the suspension of the sash ceremony, and announced that Itsaragrisil's role in official Miss Universe activities would be restricted, while CEO Mario Búcaro was sent to Thailand to coordinate with Miss Grand International to ensure the competition continues professionally and safely. Itsaragrisil issued a formal apology to all contestants during the welcoming ceremony, and denied using the words "dumb" or "dumb head", stating that the word he actually used was "damage", which means harm or loss.

=== Voting irregularities ===
Voting for the people's choice ended on November 19, but organizers suddenly extended the voting for Most Beautiful People without prior notice. The Philippines, Bangladesh, and other countries led the original results. Two days after the coronation, Miss Palestine released a video citing some irregularities in the voting procedure and claimed that it was tampered.

=== Resignations and results ===
Three members of the Miss Universe 2025 selection committee resigned before the final program.

French-Lebanese pianist composer, Omar Harfouch resigned from the Miss Universe 2025 judging panel three days before the pageant after alleging that a "clandestine" selection committee had chosen the top 30 finalists outside of the official judging process. He claimed the so-called impromptu group included individuals with personal relationships to contestants and that the real jury members were not present at its decision-making meeting. He also claimed that Mexico would win because of a deal between the co-owner of Miss Universe, Raúl Rocha, with Fátima Bosch's father, Bernardo Bosch. Bernardo Bosch is an advisor to the General Director of Pemex Exploration and Production. Raúl Rocha is also the owner of Soluciones Gasíferas del Sur, a gas company that received a contract from Pemex's subsidiary, Pemex Exploration and Production, for US$40 million in 2023. The Miss Universe Organization responded by denying the existence of such a committee and reaffirming that their established protocols remained in place while acknowledging Harfouch's withdrawal.

French football manager and former professional player, Claude Makélélé stepped down as well, citing personal reasons. Camilla di Borbone delle Due Sicilie, the president of the Miss Universe selection committee, also withdrew from the judging panel. Their decisions prompted the organization to adjust the final jury lineup and issue a brief message expressing respect for both resignations while confirming that the event would proceed with the revised panel.

Harfouch had an exclusive interview with HBO the day before the pageant that Miss Universe 2025 would be awarded to the Mexican candidate. He also posted a photo of an alleged "intimate" photo of Miss Universe owner Raúl Rocha and winner Bosch building on his allegation that the results were rigged.

Harfouch's allegations also referred to Beyond the Crown, a Miss Universe social-impact initiative. The Miss Universe Organization later clarified that the initiative operated separately from the competition and was not part of the judging or contestant-selection process.

== Aftermath ==
Amid the controversy over the results, judges Louie Heredia, Natalie Glebova, Andrea Meza, and Chalida Thaochalee lamented the absence of an accounting firm authenticating the scores for the competition. Online speculation that suggested host Steve Byrne announced the top five results in reverse led him to affirm that he announced the placement as given, but agreed with the sentiment that Yacé should have won.

=== Raúl Rocha statements ===
Raúl Rocha spoke in multiple interviews, including ones with journalists Adela Micha and Carlos Loret de Mola. Regarding the claims of a relationship between Rocha and Bernardo Bosch, Rocha stated that he met Bosch two months earlier for only thirty minutes and rejected the idea that the contracts awarded to his company were related to the victory, noting that they had been approved before he purchased Miss Universe. Rocha also said that, as an owner of Miss Universe, he has veto power, which he stated carries more weight than the contest juries, since Miss Universe is a business. He mentioned that Olivia Yacé, Miss Côte d'Ivoire, was not a favorable candidate to win because a lot of countries requires a visa for Ivorian citizens which will be a hindrance in fulfilling her duties as Miss Universe if she was awarded the crown.

== See also ==
- Crown of Deceit: Inside the Miss Universe Scandal
