= Strategic Hotels & Resorts =

American REIT in the hospitality industry

- Industry: Hospitality
- Headquarters: USA, New York

Strategic Hotels & Resorts is an American REIT in the hospitality industry. It was publicly traded on the New York Stock Exchange as BEE. The company owns 18 luxury hotels, 17 of which are located in the United States and one of which is in Germany.

Through his investment firm, Cascade Investment, Bill Gates has purchased 1.74 million shares of Strategic Hotels & Resorts Inc.’s common stock at a total price of $21.45 million – totaling 9.8% of the company's shares. Gates is the sole owner of the investment firm.

In September 2015, Strategic Hotels & Resorts sold itself to The Blackstone Group for $6 billion.

In March 2016, only 3 months after the Blackstone transaction closed, Anbang Insurance Group purchased Strategic for a price that was announced as $6.5 billion. The deal ended up being for $5.5 billion, however, after Blackstone was forbidden by the US Government to sell the Hotel del Coronado to overseas buyers with the other Strategic properties, due to its location adjacent to Naval Base Coronado.

In November 2018 it was reported that, under pressure from the Chinese government to offload overseas assets, Anbang had hired Bank of America to solicit buyers for Strategic Hotels & Resorts. On August 12, 2019, Bloomberg News reported that Mirae Asset Financial Group from South Korea was a lead bidder for the portfolio.

== Selected hotels ==
- Four Seasons Hotel, Washington, D.C.
- InterContinental Chicago Magnificent Mile
- InterContinental Miami
- JW Marriott Essex House
- Westin St. Francis
- Ritz-Carlton Half Moon Bay
- Ritz-Carlton Laguna Niguel
- Regent Santa Monica
