= InterContinental Miami =

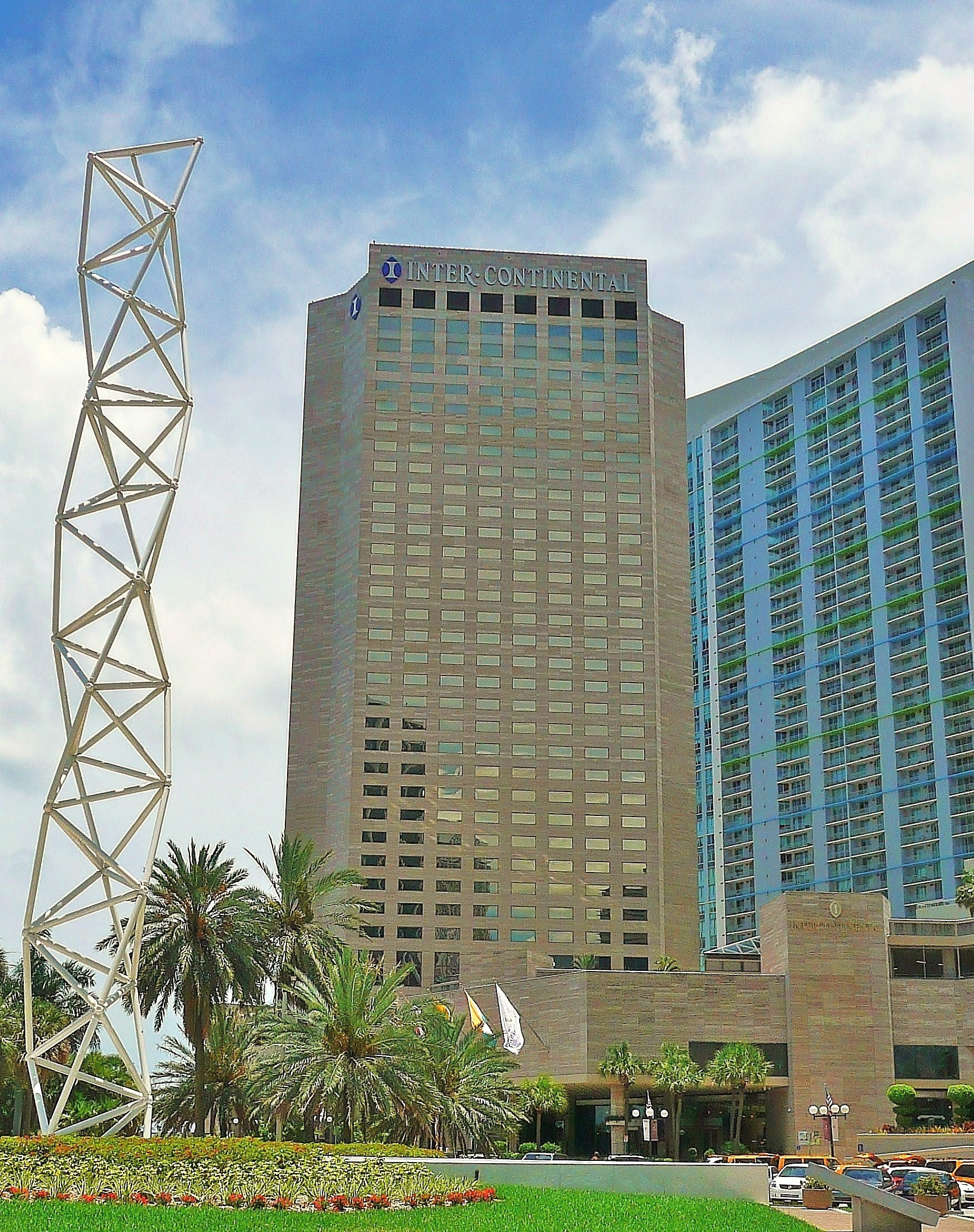
- The InterContinental as seen from Bayfront Park in 2010.
- Hotel chain: InterContinental

General information
- Type: Hotel
- Location: 100 Chopin Plaza; Miami, Florida; United States
- Coordinates: 25.772419°N 80.185373°W
- Completed: 1982
- Opening: 1982
- Owner: Strategic Hotels & Resorts
- Operator: IHG Hotels & Resorts

Height
- Roof: 366 ft (111.6 m)

Technical details
- Floor count: 34
- Lifts/elevators: 10

Other information
- Number of rooms: 653

The InterContinental Miami is a luxury hotel in Downtown Miami, Florida near Bayfront Park. Opened in 1983, it is owned by Strategic Hotels & Resorts and operated by IHG Hotels & Resorts as part of its InterContinental portfolio.

== History ==
Designed in 1982 by noted architect Pietro Belluschi. it was opened in 1983 as the Pavilion Hotel, as part of developer Theodore Gould's waterfront Miami Centre project. However it was subject to foreclosure in 1985 which led to InterContinental being selected to manage it. They were granted a long-term management contract the following year when it was renamed the Intercontinental Miami.

In 2009, the hotel began $30 million in renovations to better-complete with other downtown hotels, which were completed in 2012. The renovations included redecorated rooms with more technological features, presidential and executive suites designed by Venus Williams' agency V Starr, the new Richard Sandoval restaurant Toro Toro, and an exterior lighting system consisting of a new entrance with customizable multi-color lamps, and a 19-storey "digital canvas" of LED light bars on the sides of the building that can be used to play animations. The "digital canvas" launched with an animation featuring a silhouette of a dancing woman.

Since the 1980s, the hotel has served as the focal point of Bayfront Park's New Year's Eve festivities, where a neon sign of a cartoon orange in sunglasses dubbed the "Big Orange"—which was designed by local signmaker Steve "Mr. Neon" Carpenter—is raised up the side of the building as midnight approaches. The event was cancelled in full in 2020 due to the COVID-19 pandemic in Florida, while the 2021–22 event was modified to use a digital, projected version of the Big Orange after Carpenter and his crew fell sick with COVID-19. This remained the case for the 2022–23 event, as Carpenter declined to participate as a precautionary measure. The physical Big Orange returned the following year; while Carpenter originally stated that it would not occur due to the potential "disruption" to Orange Bowl players staying at the hotel, organizers reached an agreement to allow preparations for the event to begin earlier than usual.

== Gallery ==
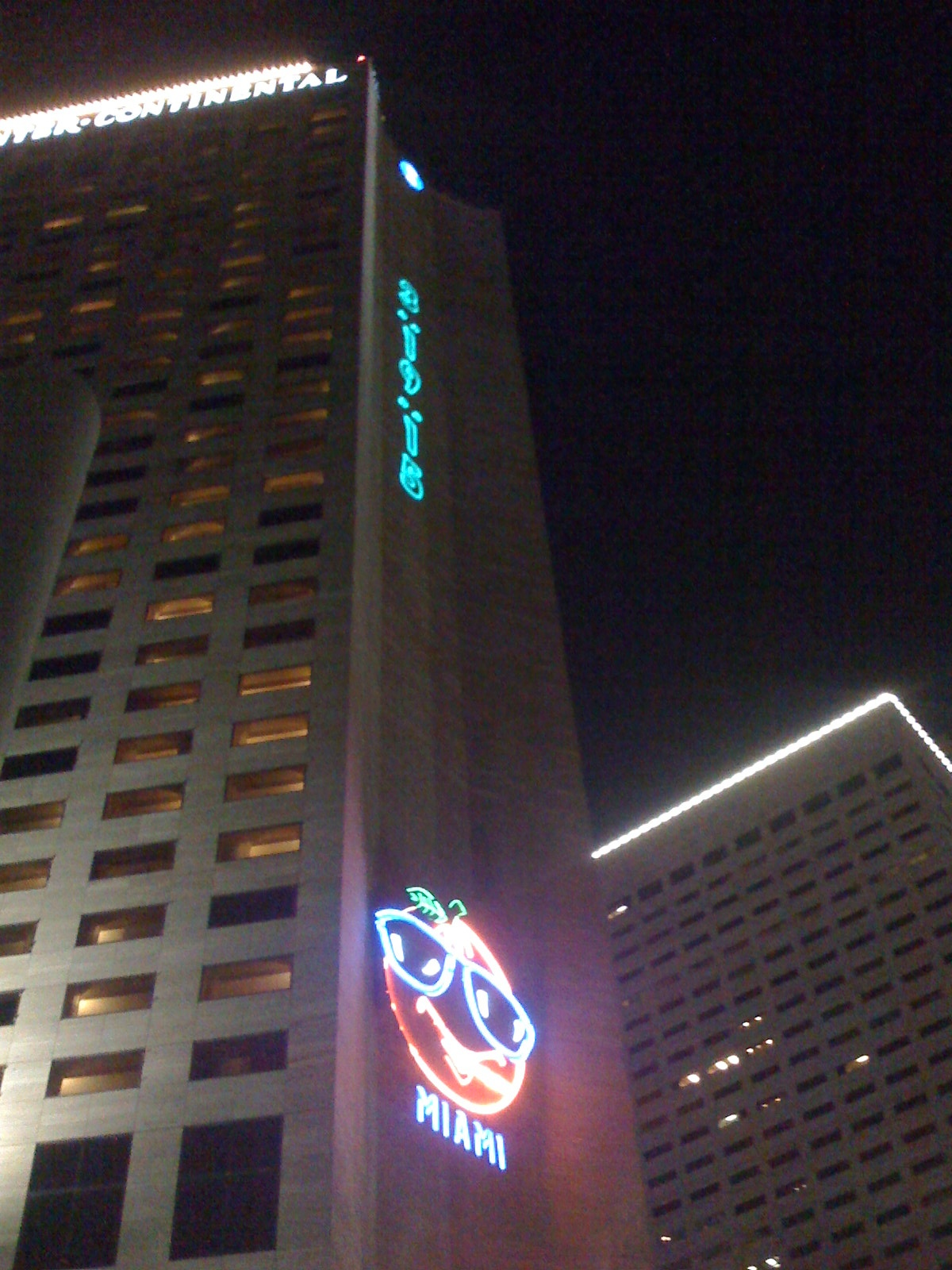
The InterContinental Miami on New Year's Eve

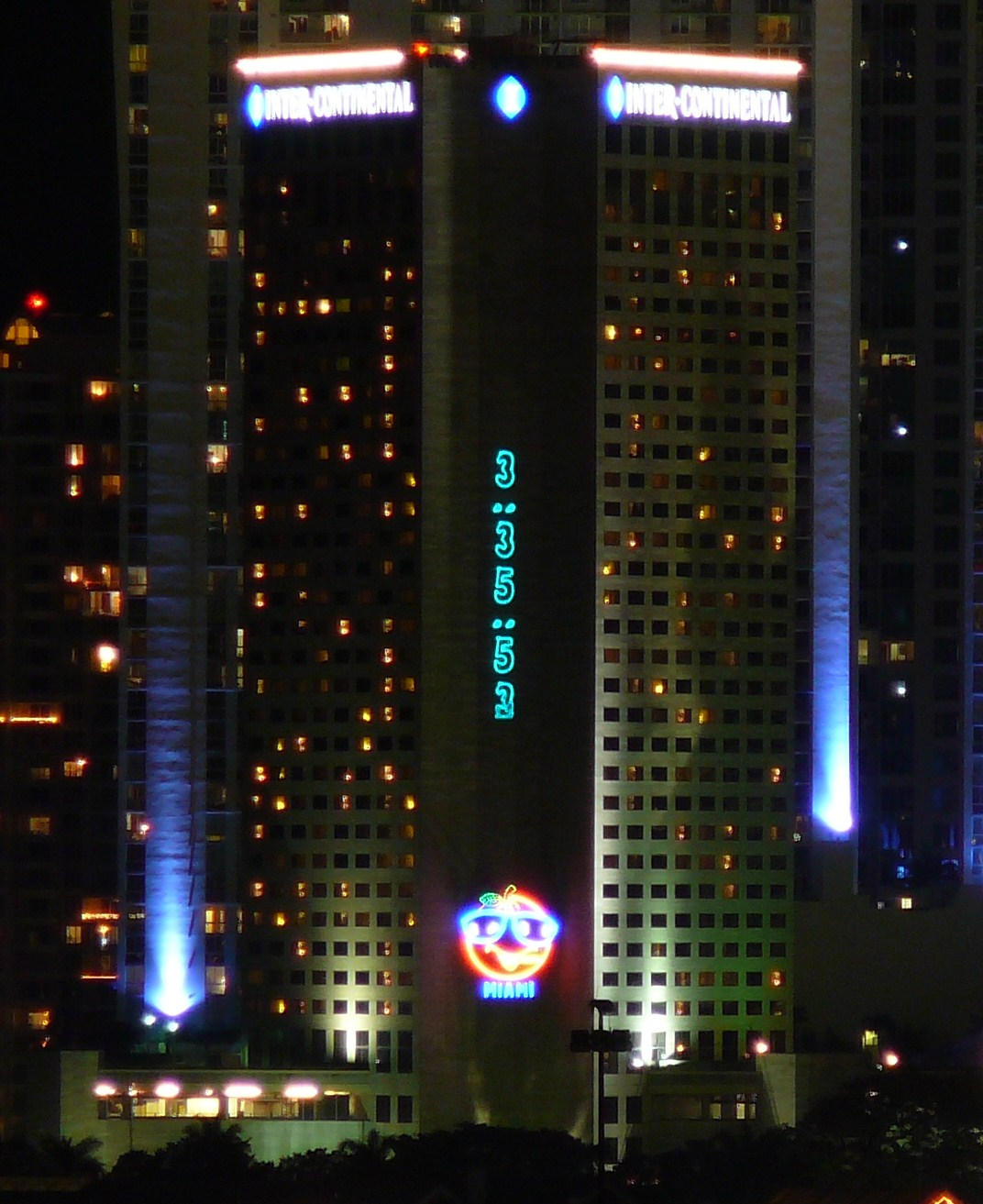
The InterContinental in Downtown Miami on New Year's Eve, 2008-2009. Mr. Neon rises to the top one minute before midnight.

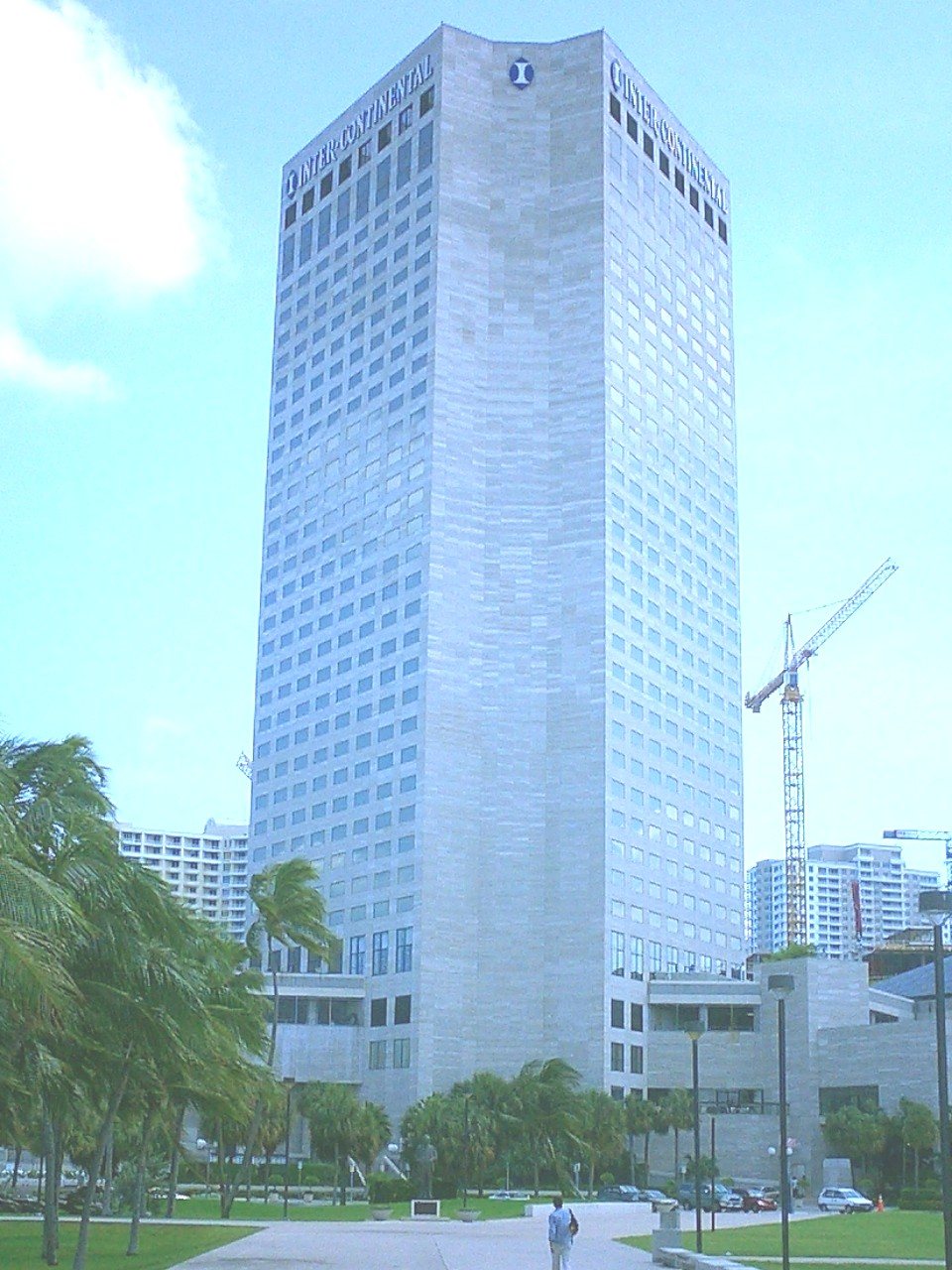
InterContinental front view

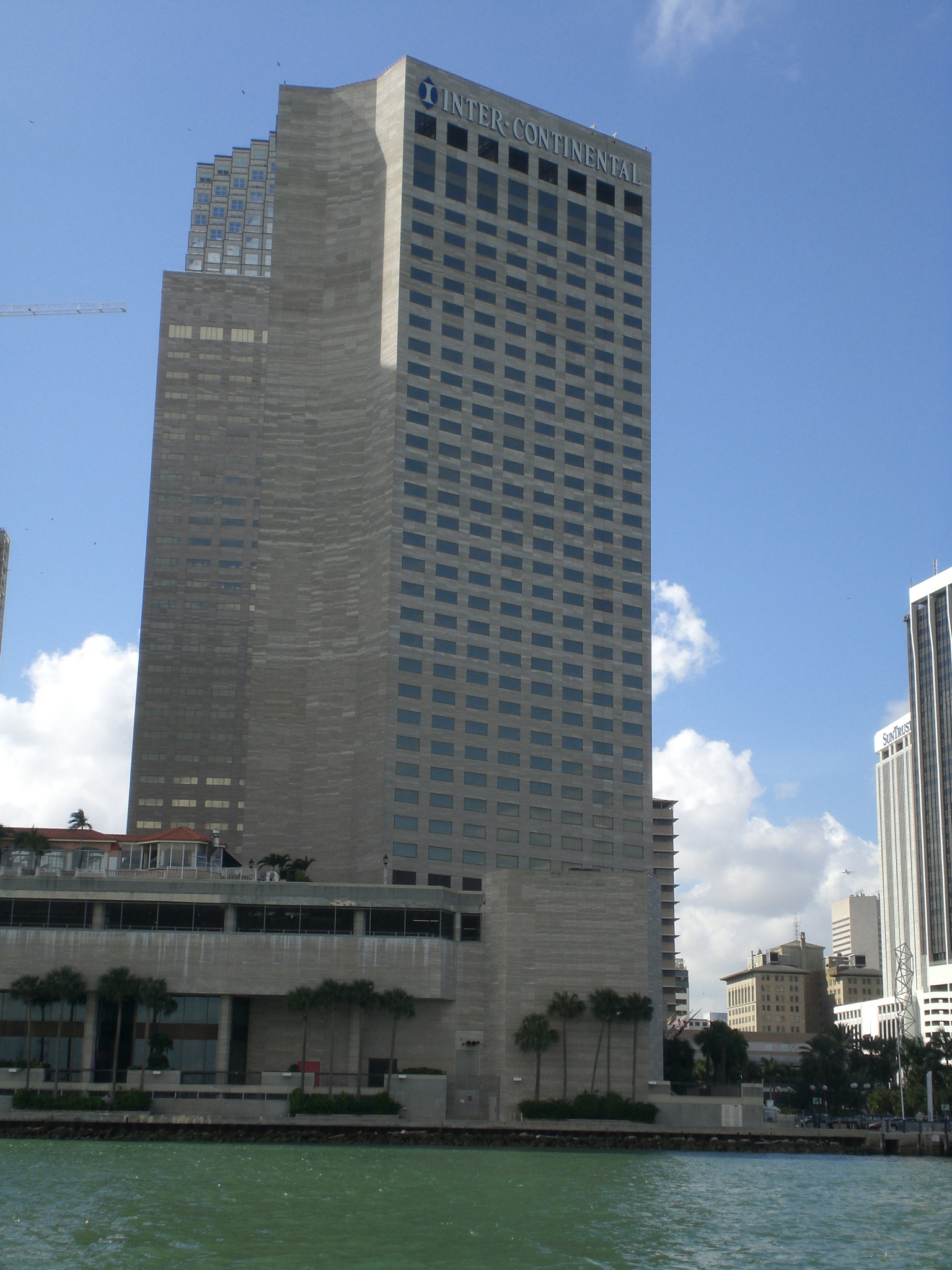
InterContinental at the edge of Biscayne Bay and the Miami River in Downtown Miami

== See also ==
- List of tallest buildings in Miami
