= Geyssell García =

Nicaraguan beauty pageant titleholder (born 1995)

- Beauty pageant titleholder
- Title: Miss Universe Nicaragua 2024
- Major competitions: Miss Universe Nicaragua 2024; winner; Miss Universe 2024; (Top 30)

Geyssell García is a Nicaraguan beauty pageant titleholder who won Miss Universe Nicaragua 2024. She represented Nicaragua at Miss Universe 2024, against 125 contestants, and reached the top 30.

Awards and achievements
Preceded by Sheynnis Palacios (Carazo)	Miss Universe Nicaragua; 2024	Succeeded by Itza Castillo (Managua)
