= Miss Serbia by year =

Serbian beauty pageant

The Miss Serbia national beauty pageant formed in 2006 and sends its titleholders on to participate in the Big Four beauty pageants.

Years: 2006 • 2007 • 2008 • 2009 • 2010 • 2011 • 2012 • 2013 • 2014 • 2015 • 2016 • 2017 • 2018 • 2019 • 2020 • 2021 • 2022 • 2023 • 2024 • 2025 • 2026

== Miss Serbia 2006 ==
Contestant	Final results	Hometown	Reference
Vedrana Grbović	Miss Serbia 2006	Belgrade	
Teodora Marčić	1st Runner-Up	Novi Sad	
Ana Mladenović	2nd Runner-Up	Subotica	
Una Kobjerski	Miss Internet	Belgrade	
Sanja Vojnović	Miss Photogenic	Belgrade	
Ana Šain	Miss Charm	Subotica	
Lidija Novaković; Tijana Gavrić; Ana Nikolić	other contestant	Priština	

== Miss Serbia 2007 ==
Contestant	Final results	Hometown	Reference
Mirjana Božović	Miss Serbia 2007	Belgrade	
Zorana Tasovac	1st Runner-Up	Novi Sad	
Bojana Borić	2nd Runner-Up	Sremska Mitrovica	
Aleksandra Pavić; Biljana Kvrgić	Top 5		
Kristina Stanojević	Miss Charm	Leskovac	
Ivana Šarac	Miss Internet		
Ana Matovic	Miss Sms	Kosovo and Metohija	
Mirjana Stojanović	Miss Photogenic		
Mirjana Stojanović; Ana Matovic; Jelena Trkulja; Danka Radić; Dragana Floranović	Top 10		

== Miss Serbia 2008 ==
Contestant	Final results	Hometown
Nevena Lipovac	Miss Serbia 2008	Belgrade
Dragana Atlija	1st Runner-Up	Knin
Milica Nedeljković	2nd Runner-Up	Sremska Mitrovica
Vanja Petrović	Miss Charm; Miss Friendship	Brisbane
Sara Trajanović	Miss Photogenic	Belgrade
Kristina Stojanović	Miss Sms	Kragujevac
Katarina Kokerić	Miss Internet	Vrnjačka Banja
Zorana Pantić; Mirjana Kostadinović; Sanja Vujić; Jelena Milosavljević; Doris Turčinović; Sara Trajanović; Vanja Petrović	Top 10	KiM; Šabac; Subotica; Kragujevac; Novi Sad; Belgrade; Australia
Nina Ivanković; Aleksandra Popović; Nevena Vasiljević; Anđela Grujičić; Marina Đokić; Sanja Radinović; Kristina Čolak; Bojana Traljić; Andrijana Milovanović; Milica Đurić; Tamara Đokić; Marija Nešković; Radmila Dučić; Nikolina Arambašić	other contestant	

== Miss Serbia 2009 ==
Contestant	Final results	Hometown	Reference
Jelena Marković	Miss Serbia 2009	Užice	
Lidija Kocić	1st Runner-Up	Belgrade	
Jovana Biševac	2nd Runner-Up	Belgrade	
Marijana Grgić; Dijana Milojković	Top 5	Novi Sad; Belgrade	
Tamara Lazić; Milica Jelić; Martina Veselinović; Aleksandra Filić; Tamara Smiljković	Top 10	Kruševac; Belgrade; Niš; Belgrade; Valjevo	
Aleksandra Stojanović; Ana Stojiljković; Biljana Zjalić; Blagodarna M.Todorić; Branka Matić; Dragana Mirković; Jasna Perenčević; Jelica Alić; Jovana Đorđević; Marijana Dobrosavljević; Mina Milisavljević; Monika Glavina; Nađa Baletić; Nevena Mihajlović; Tamara Simić; Tijana Kačavenda; Vesna Mudreša	other contestants	Niš; Niš; Temerin; Belgrade; Šabac; Pančevo; B.District; Valjevo; Leskovac; Valjevo; Subotica; Belgrade; Subotica; Belgrade; Belgrade; Novi Sad; Belgrade	

== Miss Serbia 2010 ==
Contestant	Final results	Hometown	Reference
Milica Jelić	Miss Serbia 2009	Užice	
Anja Šaranović	1st Runner-Up	Kraljevo	
Jelena Milosavljević	2nd Runner-Up	Kragujevac	
Sonja Sovljakov; Tijana Rakić	Top 5	Sombor; Belgrade	
Nataša Stanković	Miss Sport	Požarevac	
Jelena Pešić	Miss Oratory	Vranje	
Katarina Petrović	Miss Charm	Šabac	
Ana Milosavljević	Miss Interneta	Jagodina	
Kristina Stevanović; Ivana Abadžič; Bojana Rakić; Jovana Radulović; Jovana Milutinović; Gordana Draganić; Jelena Đukić; Katarina Petrović; Jelena Pešić; Jelena Vučić; Katarina Stanić; Kristina Marenović; Milica Vidosavljević; Nađa Đoković; Natalija Tofik; Radmila Dučić; Tamara Grujić	other contestants	Niš; Niš; Temerin; Belgrade; Šabac; Pančevo; B.District; Valjevo; Leskovac; Valjevo; Subotica; Belgrade; Subotica; Belgrade; Belgrade; Novi Sad; Belgrade	

== Miss Serbia 2011 ==
Contestant	Final results	Hometown	Reference
Milica Tepavac	Miss Serbia 2009	Sombor	
Bojana Lečić	1st Runner-Up	Nova Varoš	
Branislava Mandić	2nd Runner-Up	Novi Sad	
Nevena Lazović; Jelena Marinković	Top 5	Kruševac; Ub	
Milosava Garić; Katarina Krtinić; Nikolina Bojić; Milica Tomašević; Nataša Jelovac	Top 10	Jagodina - Novi Sad; Zubin Potok -	
Marija Jovanović; Marijana Miljković; Katarina Pajić; Nataša Tutorov; Marina Lazić; Vesna Krsmanović; Teodora Bjelica; Marina Maksimović; Nevena Pejatović; Nataša Stojković; Ana Tripković; Ivona Bijelić; Sanja Urošević	other contestants		

== Miss Serbia 2012 ==
Contestant	Final results	Hometown
Nikolina Bojić	Miss Serbia 2009	Kula
Aleksandra Doknić	1st Runner-Up	Požarevac
Ana Vrcelj	2nd Runner-Up	Belgrade
Amanda Manasievski; Marijana Leontijević; Sanja Vučković; Branislava Nikolić; Jovana Nikolić; Dunja Milatović; Marina Nektarijević	Top 10	Niš; Obrenovac; Belgrade; Niš; Niš; Belgrade; Kragujevac
Ivona Šimon; Monika Stracinjska; Milica Sokolović; Tanja Čupić; Ivana Vranić; Sara Stojanović; Violeta Buđi; Žana Cmiljanović; Katarina Nikolić; Marija Planić; Aleksandra Bastaja; Anđela Šćekić; Bojana Nikolić; Aleksandra Skopljak	other contestants	Bački Petrovac; Bački Petrovac 'Bela Palanka 'S.Mitrovica; Prijepolje; Belgrade; Zrenjanin; Belgrade; Požarevac; Sirogojno; Žabalj; Čačak; Belgrade; Vojka

== Miss Serbia 2013 ==
Contestant	Final results	Hometown
Milica Vukliš	Miss Serbia 2013	Belgrade
Arnela Zekovic	1st Runner-Up	Prijepolje
Jovana Maksimović	2nd Runner-Up	Vršac
Anđelka Tomašević; Deana Dimitrijević	Top 5	Zubin Potok; Belgrade
Nevena Milanović; Aleksandra Skopljak; Olivera Šiljegović; Marija Milenković	Top 10	Mladenovac; Stara Pazova; Pančevo; Belgrade
Ivona Andrić; Sanja Šević; Tanja Marković; Aleksandra Jovanović; Jelena Amanović; Anja Predojević; Nikolina Gajić; Milica Lončar; Tamara Momirov; Ivana Vidić; Jelena Sinđić; Aleksandra Marjanović; Jelena Kostić	other contestants	Belgrade; K.Mitrovica; Valjevo; Kruševac; Mladenovac; Belgrade; Belgrade; Belgrade; Belgrade; Belgrade; Knjaževac; Pančevo; Požarevac

== Miss Serbia 2014 ==
Contestant	Final results	Hometown
Marija Četković	Miss Serbia 2014	Vrbas
Daša Radosavljević	1st Runner-Up	Kragujevac
Ana Stepanov	2nd Runner-Up	Kikinda
Kristina Jevtić; Isidora Ćirković	Top 5	Kragujevac; Belgrade
Aleksandra Mitić; Tanja Marković; Kristina Krstović; Teodora Kuzman; Andrea Cvijetić	Top 10	Bela Palanka; Valjevo; Leposavić; Belgrade; Sarajevo
Kristina Jančić; Dragana Milanović; Vanja Pavić; Nevena Marinković; Marija Uskoković; Kristina Živković; Katarina Mladenović; Tijana Kuzmančević; Hristina Knežević; Milica Dimitrijević	other contestants	Valjevo; Ljig; Novi Sad; Novi Sad; K.Mitrovica; Belgrade; Belgrade; S.Mitrovica; Belgrade; Smederevo

== Miss Serbia 2015 ==
Contestant	Final results	Hometown
Katarina Šulkić	Miss Serbia 2015	Zvečan
Bojana Bojanić	1st Runner-Up	Novi Sad
Teodora Janković	2nd Runner-Up	Belgrade
Tijana Radosavljević; Jovana Obrenovic	Top 5	Kragujevac; Uzice
Kristina Jovanovic; Dragica Mihajlovic; Milica Simić; Tea Zivkovic; Nina Premovic	Top 10	Niš; Novi Sad; Paraćin; Sonta; Kragujevac
Djurdjina Vojvodic; Andjela Cirović; Larisa Gadnjai; Andrea Dzunic; Una Boskovic; Milojka Bondzulic; Nina Antić; Marija Banovic; Stefana Stevović; Evelin Horvat	other contestants	Banatsko V.S. Belgrade; Subotica; Belgrade; Belgrade; Zlatibor; Belgrade; G.Milanovac; Niš; Novi Sad

Miss Serbia 2015

== Miss Serbia 2016 ==
Contestant	Final results	Hometown	Notes	Reference
Anđelija Rogić	Miss Serbia 2016	Užice	Competed in Miss World 2017	
Sara Mitić	1st Runner-Up	Niš		
Marija Nikić	2nd Runner-Up	Zrenjanin	competed at Miss Earth 2017	
Maja Smiljkovic; Nevena Velikovski	Top 5	Leskovac; Pančevo	Competed in Miss Grand International 2017	
Milica Radin; Anja Stefanović; Jovana Doroški; Tijana Kušljić; Sandra Ciric	Top 10	Stapar; Brus; Novi Sad; Zemun; Valjevo		
Mina Čupić; Tamara Ilić; Aleksandra Ćirić; Teodora Prole; Kristina Babić; Dragana Jeftić; Anastasija Živković; Maša Đukić; Ivana Janićijević; Julija Krsmanović; Tamara Ilić	other contestants	Belgrade; Belgrade; Kikinda; Pančevo; Novi Sad; Šabac; Loznica; Belgrade; Lučani; Požega; Belgrade		

== Miss Serbia 2017 ==
Contestant	Final results	Hometown	Notes	Reference
Ivana Trisic	Miss Serbia 2017	Belgrade	Competed in Miss World 2018	
Maja Marčić	1st Runner-Up	Novi Sad		
Nina Jovanović	2nd Runner-Up	Belgrade	competed at Miss Earth 2018	
Jana Radulovic; Hristina Vujinovic; Anđela Majkić	Top 6	Niš; Šabac; Bačka Topola		
Ana Ilic; Sara Kostic; Teodora Milic; Dejana Savic	Top 10	Niš; Podrinje; Pozarevac; Belgrade		
Sara Damnjanovic; Dunja Marinkovic, Nikolina Bogdanovic; Branislava Pekez; Ksenija Velickovic; Zaklina Zivkovic; Ivana Gojkovic; Hristina Jerotic; Anja Stojisavljevic; Ana Mitrovic; Andjela Mihajlovic	other contestants	Belgrade; Zrenjanin; Pancevo; Novi Sad; Belgrade; Gnjilane; Zemun; Pancevo; Sremski Karlovci; Uzice; Niš		

== Miss Serbia 2018 ==
Contestant	Final results	Hometown	Reference
Sanja Lovčević	Miss Serbia 2018	Belgrade	
Nađa Kljajić	1st Runner-Up	Belgrade	
Tamara Novaković	2nd Runner-Up	Priština	
Jelena Stanković; Anđelina Vojinović	Top 5	Krusevac; Obrenovac	
Milica Milosavljević; Kristina Radosavljević, Andrijana Savić; Milica Milivojević; Ema Lebanov Tatjana Marčeta; Milica Milić; Maja Milovanović; Kristina Cvetković; Tamara Arsin; Marija Trčič; Jelena Bošnjačić; Aleksandra Radoičić; Aleksandra Kaločanj	other contestants	Belgrade; Grocka; Gornji Milanovac; Mladenovac; Pancevo; Leska; Ćuprija; Kragujevac; Srpska Crnja; Sremska Mitrovica; Nova Pazova; Pancevo; Kikinda	

== Miss Serbia 2019 ==
Contestant	Final results	Hometown	Reference
Andrijana Savić	Miss Serbia 2019	Gornji Milanovac	
Ivana Bogdanovski	1st Runner-Up	Pancevo	
Katarina Mićić	2nd Runner-Up	Požarevac	
Nastasja Popović; Anastasija Murić; Ivana Stevanović	Top 6	Belgrade; Belgrade; Šabac	
Anja Radić; Smiljana Anđelović; Željana Stojanović; Ankica Živkovic; Marija Petrović; Jovana Lišanin; Marina Granić; Teodora Mitić; Jovanka Radojčić; Nađa Stamenković; Slavica Burmaz; Milica Pavlović; Valentina Vasilić; Kristina Jelić; Tamara Vrekić	other contestants	Belgrade; Kačarevo; Smederevo; Kragujevac; Belgrade; Belgrade; Vršac; Zaječar; Čačak; Pancevo; Vrnjacka Banja; Priboj; Pozarevac	

== Miss Serbia 2020 ==
Contestant	Final results	Hometown	Reference
The Miss Serbia 2020 pageant was not held due to the COVID-19 pandemic.			

== Miss Serbia 2021 ==
Contestant	Final results	Hometown	Reference
Anja Radić	Miss Serbia 2021	Belgrade	
Anela Džanović	1st Runner-Up	Priboj	
Anđela Bucalo	2nd Runner-Up	Belgrade	
Nataša Pilipović; Venera Stanisavljević	Top 5	Vrbas; Niš	
Anastasija Ranković; Iva Jančić; Lea Mudresa; Anastasija Javorac; Emina Rajičić; Andrea Pešić; Valentina Moravčević; Ivana D. Pavlović; Anastasija Krstić; Milica Jovanović; Milica Ilić; Katarina Mijatović; Iva Jelinović; Ivana M. Pavlović; Tijana Madžarević	Other contestants	Mladenovac; Smederevska Palanka; Kragujevac; Belgrade; Čačak; Smederevo; Šabac; Belgrade; Belgrade; Kragujevac; Požarevac; Loznica; Belgrade; Ljubovija; Belgrade	

== Miss Serbia 2022 ==
Contestant	Final results	Hometown
The Miss Serbia 2022 pageant was not held.

== Miss Serbia 2023 ==
Contestant	Final results	Hometown
The Miss Serbia 2023 pageant was not held.

== Miss Serbia 2024 ==
Contestant	Final results	Hometown	Age	Reference
Aleksandra Rutović	Miss Serbia 2024	Belgrade	25	
Nađa Đokić	1st Runner-Up	Bajina Bašta	20	
Mia Milić	2nd Runner-Up	Podgorica	20	
Lara Buyse; Nelly Terzić	Top 5	Athens; Kyiv	20; 20	
Milica Mikić; Milica Popović; Nikolina Ines Ristić; Lejla Kratovac; Maria Viktorija Matić; Anja Dimitrijević; Milica Brežančić; Javorka Ramić; Nikolina Trnić; Mila Davidović; Ivana Popović; Lenka Bojanić; Milica Đorđević	Other contestants	Lazarevac; Šabac; Genoa; Prijepolje; Sombor; Belgrade; Belgrade; Žitorađa; Banatsko Novo Selo; Niš; Novi Sad; Subotica; Kragujevac	23; 19; 20; 19; 26; 21; 18; 20; 17; 17; 26; 17; 22	

== Miss Serbia 2025 ==
Contestant	Final results	Hometown	Age	Reference
Simona Manojlović	Miss Serbia 2025	Ravno Selo	21	
Mia Ristić	1st Runner-Up	Belgrade	20	
Teodora Ristić	2nd Runner-Up		20	
Irina Subotić; Sara Milikić	Top 5	Irig; Sjenica	24; 19	
Anđela Kalinović; Kristina Gajić; Anđela Vasović; Tatjana Maksimović; Ena Milinković; Iva Janković; Tania Nikolić; Mina Nenadović; Kristina Spalević; Anđelija Alempijević; Una Mijajlica; Kristina Mladenović; Anastasija Skorup	Other contestants	Belgrade; Lajkovac; Požega; Bajina Bašta; Niš; Barajevo; Jagodina; Valjevo; Kragujevac; Ljig; Belgrade; Niš; Nevesinje	24; 20; 21; 20; 18; 20; 22; 19; 23; 20; 20; 23; 18	
