= Miss Universe Serbia =

Beauty pageant

Miss Universe Serbia Organization
- Formation: 2024; 2 years ago
- Type: Beauty pageant
- Headquarters: Belgrade
- Location: Serbia
- Members: Miss Universe
- Official language: Serbia
- National Director: Poppy Cappella

Miss Universe Serbia (Serbian: Miss Universe Srbije) is a national beauty pageant in Serbia for Miss Universe.

== History ==
Miss Universe Serbia built in 2024 under Aleksandar Zivkovic. The main winner of Miss Universe Serbia represented Serbia at Miss Universe. Before 2024, the Serbian representatives were selected by Miss Serbia. Daša Radosavljević is the last Miss Universe Serbia under Miss Serbia Organization, while Ivana Trišić is the first Miss Universe Serbia winner under the new management. In 2025, the national franchise was held by Poppy Capella. In 2026, the Miss Universe Serbia license was transferred to Toxic Entertainment, which became the new national license holder and organizer of the competition.

== Franchise holders ==
- Vesna De Vinča (2007―2015)
- Aleksandar Zivkovic (2024)
- Poppy Cappella (2025)
- Toxic Entertainment(2026-present)

== Titleholders ==
- : Declared as Winner
- : Ended as runner-up or top 5/6 qualification
- : Ended as one of the finalists or semifinalists
- : Ended as special awards winner

Year	Municipality	Miss Universe Srbije	Placement at Miss Universe	Special Award(s)	Notes
Poppy Capella — a franchise holder to Miss Universe from 2025
2026	Rekovac	Nikolina Vujcic	TBA		
2025	Belgrade	Jelena Egorova	Unplaced		Jelena Egorova was chosen by the owner of Miss Universe 2025, Poppy Capella. She is naturalized Serbian with a Russo-Mongolian descent.
Aleksandar Zivkovic directorship — a franchise holder to Miss Universe in 2024
2024	Belgrade	Ivana Trišić	Top 30		Began 2024, Miss Universe Serbia was independently held a national pageant under Aleksandar Zivkovic directorship.
Vesna De Vinča directorship — a franchise holder to Miss Universe between 2007 and 2015
Did not compete between 2016—2023
2015	Kragujevac	Daša Radosavljević	Unplaced		
2014	Kosovska Mitrovica	Anđelka Tomašević	Unplaced		
2013	Zemun	Ana Vrcelj	Unplaced		A Runner-up took over after the main winner did not compete at Miss Universe.
2012	Novi Sad	Branislava Mandić	Unplaced		A Runner-up took over after the main winner did not compete at Miss Universe.
2011	Kraljevo	Anja Šaranović	Unplaced		
2010	Belgrade	Lidija Kocić	Unplaced		
2009	Knin	Dragana Atlija	Unplaced		
2008	Novi Sad	Bojana Borić	Unplaced		
2007	Novi Sad	Teodora Marčić	Unplaced		

== Editions ==
=== 2026 ===
The competition featured 16 finalists.

#	Contestant	Age	Hometown	Placement
1	Nikolina Vujčić	24	Chicago	Winner
2	Jelena Njegovan	23	Apatin	1st Runner-Up
3	Tara Stojšić	20	Senta	2nd Runner-Up
4	Jovanka Radojičić	26	Čačak	3rd Runner-Up
5	Ajsela Kadribašić	20	Prijepolje	Top 8
6	Nikolina Marković	19	Belgrade	Top 8
7	Amanda Vukliš	25	Belgrade	Top 8
8	Marta Bakić	18	Prokuplje	Top 8
9	Mina Đurđević	22	Sremska Mitrovica	Top 16
10	Jovana Karać	22	Turija	Top 16
11	Nada Bošković	23	Belgrade	Top 16
12	Mila Janković	21	Niš	Top 16
13	Helena Petrović	18	Leskovac	Top 16
14	Milica Sretkov	23	Pančevo	Top 16
15	Anđela Milojević	24	Belgrade	Top 16
16	Andjelina Ristić	19	Belgrade	Top 16

=== 2025 ===
No national pageant was held, and Jelena Egorova was appointed as Serbia's representative.

Designation	Contestant	Notes
Representative	Jelena Egorova	Appointed by the franchise owner; no national pageant was held.

=== 2024 ===
The competition featured eight finalists, with Ivana Trišić crowned as the winner.

#	Contestant	Placement
1	Ivana Trišić	Winner
2	Katarina Munic	1st Runner-up
3	Jelena Njegovan	2nd Runner-up
4	Mila Janković	Top 8
5	Anđela Vanevski	Top 8
6	Milica Krstović	Top 8
7	Nevena Tomić	Top 8
8	Ivana Brčan	Top 8

== See also ==
- Miss Yugoslavia
- Miss Serbia by year
