= Miss Yugoslavia (Serbia and Montenegro) =

Miss Yugoslavia Miss Serbia and Montenegro
- Formation: 1996 (as Miss Yugoslavia); 2003 (as Miss Serbia and Montenegro)
- Dissolved: 2003 (as Miss Yugoslavia); 2006 (as Miss Serbia and Montenegro)

Miss Yugoslavia was the national beauty pageant of the Federal Republic of Yugoslavia, held since 1996 after the breakup of Yugoslavia.

It was organized by the company "Miss YU". The same company had held Miss Yugoslavia in former Yugoslavia.

In 2003 the Miss YU renamed as Miss Serbia and Montenegro.

Delegates represented FR Yugoslavia / Serbia and Montenegro at Miss Universe, Miss World, Miss Europe, Miss International, and Miss Earth contests.

In 2006, independent Montenegro and Serbia began hosting separate pageants, Miss Montenegro and Miss Serbia, respectively.

== Titleholders ==
=== Miss Yugoslavia ===
Year	Miss Yugoslavia (in Serbia and Montenegro)
1996	Slavica Krivokuća
1997	Tamara Šaponjić
1998	Jelena Trninić
1999	Ana Karić
2000	Iva Milivojević
2001	Ana Janković
2002	Ana Šargić

=== Miss Serbia and Montenegro ===
Year	Miss Serbia and Montenegro
2003	Bojana Vujadinović
2004	Jelena Pejić
2005	Dina Džanković
2006	Vedrana Grbović

== Major International competitions ==
Color key

- Declared as Winner
- Ended as runner-up
- Ended as one of the finalists or semifinalists

=== Miss Universe ===
The 1st Runner-Up of Miss Yugoslavia (later Miss Serbia and Montenegro) would compete at Miss Universe. If the 1st Runner-Up could not compete, the 2nd Runner-Up or a finalist would take their place if able to.

Year	Miss Universe Yugoslavia/Serbia and Montenegro	Placement
1998	Jelena Trninić	Unplaced
1999	Ana Karić	Unplaced
2000	Lana Marić	Unplaced
2001	Ana Janković	Unplaced
2002	Slađana Božović	Unplaced
MISS UNIVERSE SERBIA & MONTENEGRO
2003	Sanja Papić	3rd Runner-Up
2004	Dragana Dujović	Unplaced
2005	Jelena Mandić	Unplaced
2006	Nada Milinić	Unplaced

=== Miss World ===
The main winner of Miss Yugoslavia (later Miss Serbia and Montenegro) would primarily compete at Miss World. If the winner could not compete, the 1st Runner-Up would take their place if able to.

Year	Miss World Yugoslavia/Serbia and Montenegro	Placement
1996	Slavica Krivokuća	Unplaced
1997	Tamara Šaponjić	Unplaced
1998	Jelena Jakovljević	Unplaced
1999	Lana Marić	Unplaced
2000	Iva Milivojević	Unplaced
2001	Tijana Stajšić	Top 10
2002	Ana Šargić	Top 20
MISS WORLD SERBIA & MONTENEGRO
2003	Bojana Vujadinović	Unplaced
2004	Selena Pejić	Unplaced
2005	Dina Džanković	Unplaced

=== Miss International ===
Like Miss Universe, a Runner-Up of Miss Yugoslavia (later Miss Serbia and Montenegro) would compete at Miss International. If the original delegate could not compete, another Runner-Up or a finalist would take their place if able to.

Year	Miss International Yugoslavia/Serbia and Montenegro	Placement
MISS INTERNATIONAL YUGOSLAVIA
2001	Iva Gordana Milivojević	Unplaced
2002	Aleksandra Kokotovic	Unplaced
MISS INTERNATIONAL SERBIA & MONTENEGRO
2003	Anđa Ratko Budimir	Unplaced
2004	Jasna Božović	Unplaced
2005	Sanja Miljanić	Top 12
2006	Danka Dizdarević	Unplaced

=== Miss Earth ===
Like with other international pageants, a Runner-Up or finalist of Miss Yugoslavia (later Miss Serbia and Montenegro) would compete at Miss Earth. If the original delegate could not compete, another Runner-Up or a finalist would take their place if able to.

Year	Miss Earth Yugoslavia/Serbia and Montenegro	Placement
MISS EARTH YUGOSLAVIA
2002	Slađana Božović	2nd Runner-up
MISS EARTH SERBIA & MONTENEGRO
2003	Katarina Vučetić	Top 10
2004	Katarina Hadži Pavlović	Unplaced
2005	Jovana Marjanović	3rd Runner-up
2006	Dubravka Škorić	Unplaced
