= Arnela Zeković =

Serbian model

Arnela Zeković (Nela)
- Born: Arnela Zeković; 1993 (age 32–33); Prijepolje, FR Yugoslavia
- Height: 1.74 m (5 ft 8 1/2 in)
- Beauty pageant titleholder
- Hair color: Brunette
- Eye color: brown
- Major competitions: Miss Serbia 2013 (1st Runner-Up)

Arnela Zeković (born 1993) is a Serbian model, influencer and beauty pageant titleholder.

== Pageants ==
=== Miss Bikini International ===
Zeković competed and represented Croatia at the Miss Bikini International.

=== Miss Serbia 2013 ===
Zeković placed as 1st Runner-Up in Miss Serbia 2013 pageant which was held at RTV Pink Studio in Belgrade. In the preparations for Miss Serbia, which was organized in Greece, Arnela won the first place as Miss Porto Carras

Awards and achievements
Preceded by Ana Vrcelj	Miss Serbia; 2013	Succeeded by Andjelka Tomasevic
