= Laura Cepeda =

Spanish actress (born 1953)

Laura Cepeda (born June 24, 1953) is a Spanish actress and casting director.

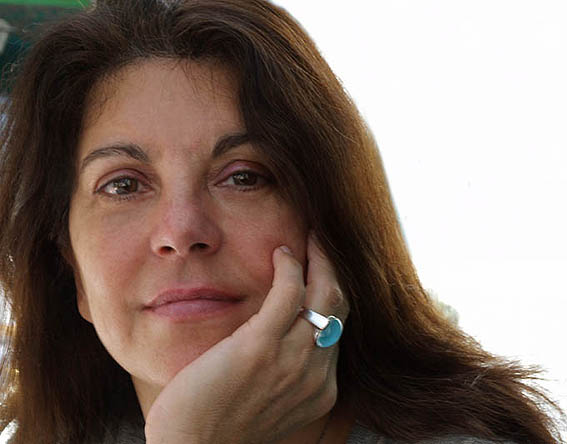
Laura Cepeda

== Biography ==
She is the daughter of Maria de las Mercedes Golferichs and Hector Manuel Cepeda and she was born in Monterrey, Mexico, where she lived until the age of five, when her mother divorced and moved to Barcelona, her family’s original town.

She was studying philosophy at Barcelona’s University when at the age of 20 years she was arrested by the police, as a result of her participation in a demonstration against the Spanish State. She was released after a couple of days of interrogation and sentenced to house arrest awaiting trial. However, her mother managed to get her a false passport and she left the country with a group of Japanese tourists on their way to Italy.

She lived in Milan for 3 years, where she went to college, graduating in Philosophy and drama at the Piccolo Teatro in Milan. She studied acting with Grotowski, Strasberg, McCallion and others moving then to Rome where she worked as a stage actress for three years in plays of Bertold Brech (Baal, 1977), Alfonso Del Gatto (El duelo, 1978) or Dario Fo (La storia di un soldato, 1979). On her return to Spain after the death of the dictator, she developed a great stage work with the applause of the critic, starring different plays like Amadeus by Peter Shaffer (1982), where she played the wife of the composer, the Glass Menagerie of Tennessee Williams, the Night of the Tribadas of Pero Olov Enquist (1994), the monologue of Charlotte Brontë (1996), or Valeria and the birds of Sanchis Sinisterra (2001) among others.

In 1994, Laura created her own production company, Respira Teatro, producing the above-mentioned Night of the Tribadas and Written on the water, with texts of Luis Cernuda (1995). In 1996, she founded a new company, Canalla Teatro, producing the Law of the Jungle of Elvira Lindo (1996), Bronte by William Luce (1996–1997) and Fidelity, by Chazz Palmentieri (1999). She has developed a long career also on screen, performing different roles in films such as FEN (1979), Kargus (1982), Baton Rouge (1982)- her interpretation in this one earned her a nomination for the Goya Awards as best supporting actress-, Mirada Liquida (1996, best actress prize at the festival of Alexandria in 1997), Nosotras (2000) or Proximo Oriente (2006) amongst other productions. In 2013 she played the role of Salma Hayek’s mother in Joe Lynch’s film Everly. Between 1981 and 2008, more than twenty TV series or films have also benefited from their acting. Since 2001, her main activity is casting direction both for TV spots and fiction. Her studio has provided actors for many of the best Spanish directors, but also for British and American directors, including Antonio Banderas (El Camino de los Ingleses), Hugh Hudson (Altamira), Peter Jackson (The Blind of Seville), or Michel Radford (La Mula).

== Theatre ==
- Amadeus Paul Schaffer, 1982
- La Dorotea Lope de Vega, 1983
- La loca carrera del árbitro Martínez Mediero, 1985
- Negro seco de Marisa Hares, 1985
- Paso a paso de R. Harris, 1986
- The Odd Couple N. Simon, 1987
- Historia de una muñeca abandonada A. Sastre, 1989
- El desdén, con el desdén Agustín Moreto, 1990–1991
- The Glass Menagerie Tennessee Williams, 1993
- La noche de las Tríbadas P. Olov Enquist, 1994
- La ley de la selva E. Lindo, 1995
- Bronte W. Luce, 1996
- Common Ground H. Fierstein, 1997
- Fidelidad C. Palminteri, 1999
- Valeria y los pájaros J. Sanchís Sinisterra, 2000
- Todo sobre Vázquez Jaime Palacios, 2013
- El malestar que insiste Eduardo Recabarren, 2014

== Filmography ==
- The Meadow Dir. Taviani Brothers (Italy, 1978)
- FEN Dir. A. Hernández (Spain, 1979)
- Kargus Dir. J. Miñón (Spain, 1981)
- Apaga y Vámonos Dir. A. Hernández (Spain, 1983)
- Marga Dir. R. Alcázar (Spain, 1987)
- The Post Office Girl Dir. Édouard Molinaro (Czech-Spain, 1987)
- Baton Rouge Dir. R. Moleon (Spain, 1988)
- Una espía en mi cama Dir. G. Quintana (Spain-US, 1989)
- El niño invisible Dir. R. Moleon (Spain, 1995)
- Mirada Líquida Dir. R. Moleon (Spain, 1996)
- Náufragos 97 Dir. A. Pajares (Spain, 1997)
- Nosotras Dir. J. Colell (Spain, 2000)
- Grimm Dir. A. Van Warmerdam (Spain-Netherlands, 2003)
- Próximo Oriente Dir. F. Colomo (Spain, 2006)
- 53 días de invierno Dir. J. Colell (Spain, 2006)
- Rivales Dir. F. Colomo (Spain, 2008)
- Everly Dir. Joe Lynch (US, 2013)
- El asesino de los caprichos Dir. Gerardo Herrero (Spain, 2019)
