= Ana Šargić =

Serbian model

- Born: Ana Šargić
- Beauty pageant titleholder
- Hair color: Brown
- Eye color: Green
- Major competitions: Miss Serbia 2002 (Winner); Miss World 2002 (Top 20)

Ana Šargić (born c. 1983) is a Serbian model and beauty pageant titleholder. She was the 2002 Miss Yugoslavia winner.

== Miss World 2002 ==
Šargić was the official representative of her country to the Miss World 2002 pageant held at the Alexandra Palace in London, United Kingdom, where she placed as one of the top 20 semi-finalists of the competition.
