= Ritambhara =

Indian fashion carnival

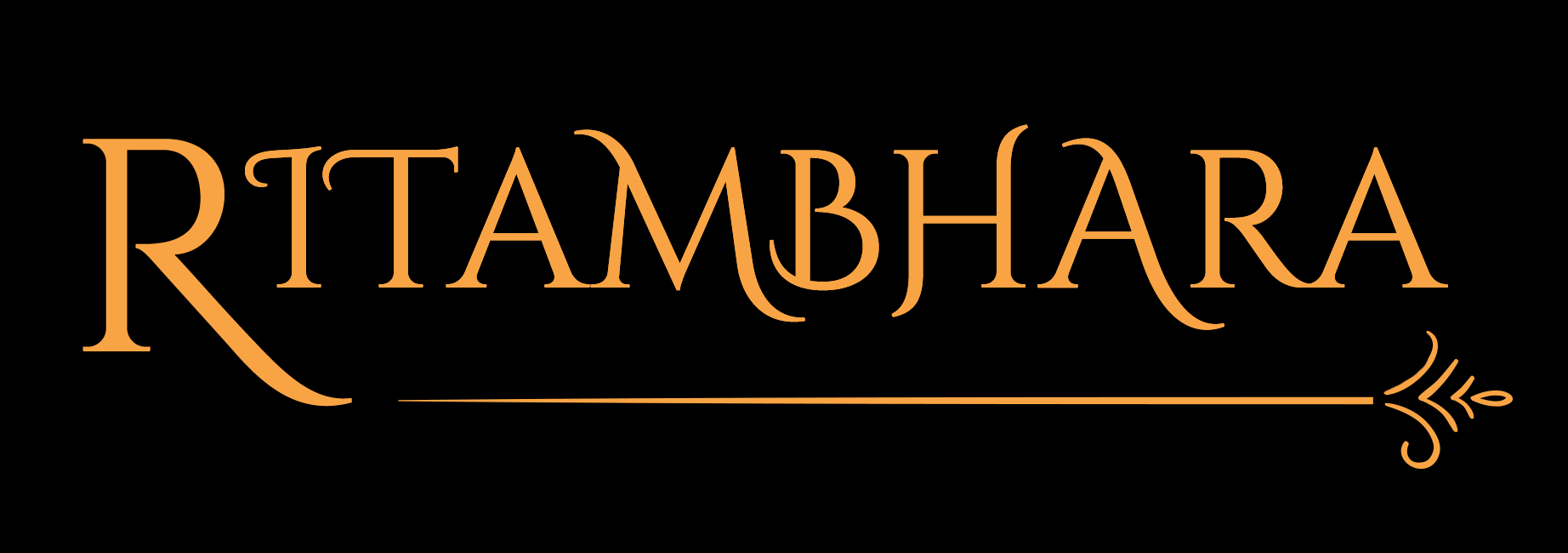
- Genre: Non-Profit, Student run Organization
- Location: Kanpur, India
- Years active: 55
- Founded: 1964
- Patron: Indian Institute of Technology, Kanpur
- Website: www.antaragni.in/ritambhara/

Ritambhara (Hindi: ऋतंभरा) is the fashion carnival of Antaragni, the annual cultural fest of the Indian Institute of Technology Kanpur held in the month of October. It is a four-day-long event, attracting participation from more than 100 colleges across the country.

Ritambhara has featured judges including Nawazuddin Siddiqui, Kunal Kapoor, Kanika Kapur, Arnela Zekovic, Simran Kaur Mundi, Bidita Bag, Noyonita Lodh, Shilpa Singh. Established in 1964 by a group of IIT Kanpur students, Ritambhara, now in its 53rd edition, provides a platform for designers and models to showcase their talents through various themed competitive events. It is a non-profit event organized entirely by IIT Kanpur students. Initially, the event was small and funded solely by the Student Gymkhana of IIT Kanpur. Over time, it gained recognition in the fashion world, with its budget now supported through sponsorship. Ritambhara has also garnered significant media attention and numerous well-known sponsors.

== Competitions ==
Ritambhara comprises several competitions:

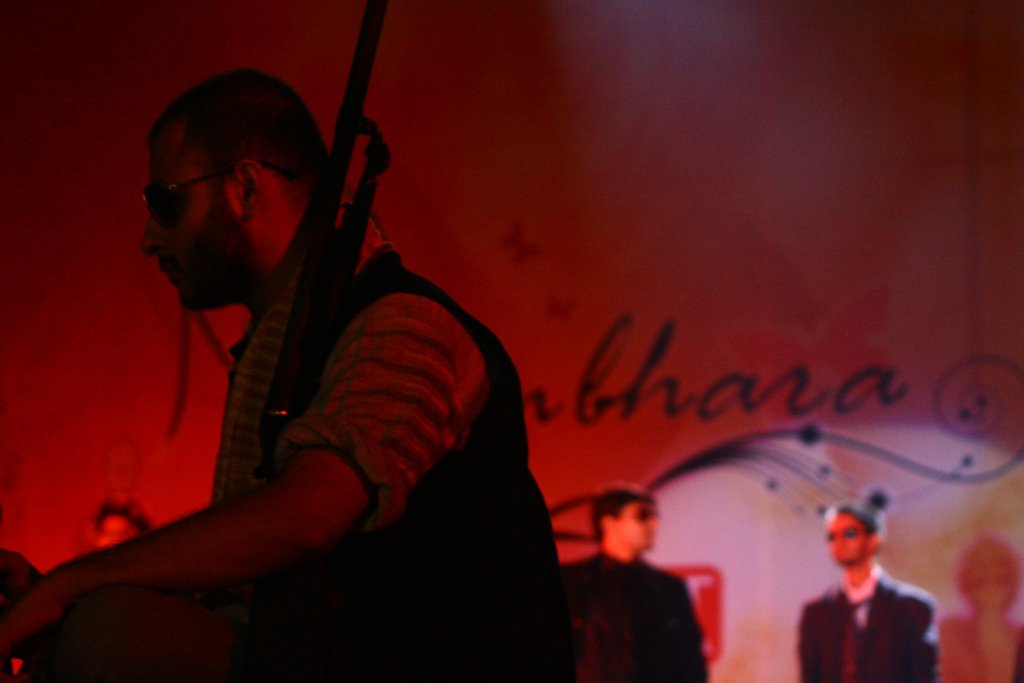
IIT Kanpur's Final Year batch performing at Ritambhara 2010

Ritambhara Prelims - Held on the first day of Antaragni, this event features approximately 20 college teams competing for selection by the jury for the final round.

Ritambhara Finale - On the day following the Prelims, the selected teams compete further. One team is declared the winner, and another is named the runner-up. The best-performing models receive the titles of Mr. Ritambhara and Ms. Ritambhara.

Diseñador - On the third day, designers are given the opportunity to create a complete wardrobe, including accessories, to highlight the model and bring their envisioned character to life.

Mr. and Ms. Impressionante - Also on the third day, this event features individual participants competing for the titles of Mr. Impressionante and Ms. Impressionante.

Elegancia - This is an online selfie contest that invites participation from across the country, with the winner determined by the number of votes received for their selfie.

== Dream On campaign ==
The Dream On campaign allows participants to be mentored by people working in the industry. Dream On was held for the first time with Antaragni 12. This concept was also introduced in Ritambhara at the same time. In the past, the winners were provided with direct professional portfolio shoots with fashion photographers, fashion designers, and modelling agencies including Rohit Dhingra, Faces Model Management, Modelling India, Josh Ghoraya, and Surendri.

== Participating colleges ==
Ritambhara includes participation from several fashion and non-fashion colleges of the country like NIFT Delhi, NIFT Kolkata, INIFD Ludhiana, St. Xaviers Kolkata, Pearl Delhi, and many more. University of Delhi (DU) along with colleges from states like U.P., Punjab, Rajasthan and Haryana, and colleges from the Kolkata circuit. Altogether, there is participation from more than 50 colleges nationwide.

== Judges ==
Ritambhara has seen fashion designers, fashion photographers, models, Bollywood actors and actresses as its judges in the past few years.

| Year | Judges |
|---|---|
| 2010 | Miss Fernanda, Rinku Sobti, Rohit Dhingra |
| 2011 | Rohit Dhingra, Prateek Kharb, Abdul Haider |
| 2012 | Pallavi Jaipur, Rishita Monga, Hemant J khendiwal, Kartik Tiwari, Nushrat Bharucha |
| 2013 | Nawazuddin Siddiqui, Elena Kazan, Munish Khanna, Chhaya Mehrotra, Niket and Jaini |
| 2014 | Kunal Kapoor, Prachi Mishra, Hemant Sood, Sujit Meher |
| 2015 | Noyonita Lodh, Shilpa Singh, Kanika Kapur, Siddharth Joshi, Josh Goraya |
| 2017 | Simran Kaur Mundi, Arnela Zekovic, Bidita Bag, Nitin Sarna, Meenal Shah, Tanya Virmani |

== Awards and prizes ==
Ritambhara

For Models(1 male and 1 female):

- Entry into the final round of Impressionante.
- Title of Mr. and Miss Ritambhara.
- Modelling Assignments or portfolio under renowned people of the industry.

For Teams:

- 1st Team ₹ 35,000 (COULD BE CHANGED)
- 2nd Team ₹ 20,000 (COULD BE CHANGED)

A lot of goodies are at stake too. Some special prizes to be unveiled shortly. Stay connected through our Ritambhara website and facebook page.

For Designer (one):

- Title of best designer.
- Cash prize INR 10k
- Internship under a renowned fashion designer.

Diseñador

- 1st Prize- INR12000 2nd Prize- INR8000.
- Designers of the winning team would be awarded design internship at a prestigious fashion firm.
- The models will receive UCB and VLCC vouchers.
- The Best three designs along with the photoshoot, will be featured on a renowned media platform.

Impressionante

- 1st Prize INR 8000 each
- Mr. and Miss Impressionante will be awarded with a cash prize of ₹ 8000/each (COULD BE CHANGED) and a portfolio to be shot by a renowned photographer.
- Winners will get a mention in popular fashion magazine.

Elegancia

- Weekly winners will be announced and will get a chance to win exciting goodies.
- One male and one female winner will be declared at the end of the contest.

== Commercial opportunities ==
Ritambhara has attracted sponsorships from brands due to participation of students from all over India. Alumni also visit the institute during this time. Companies associated with Ritambhara in 2014 include Monte Carlo and Vimal as Title Sponsors; Pantaloons, Turtle and Woodland as Associate Title Sponsors. Ritambhara has also been associated with fashion magazines like FHM (India), Maxim (India), Abraxas Lifestyle, and youth magazines like Abraxas NU as media partners.

== Gallery ==
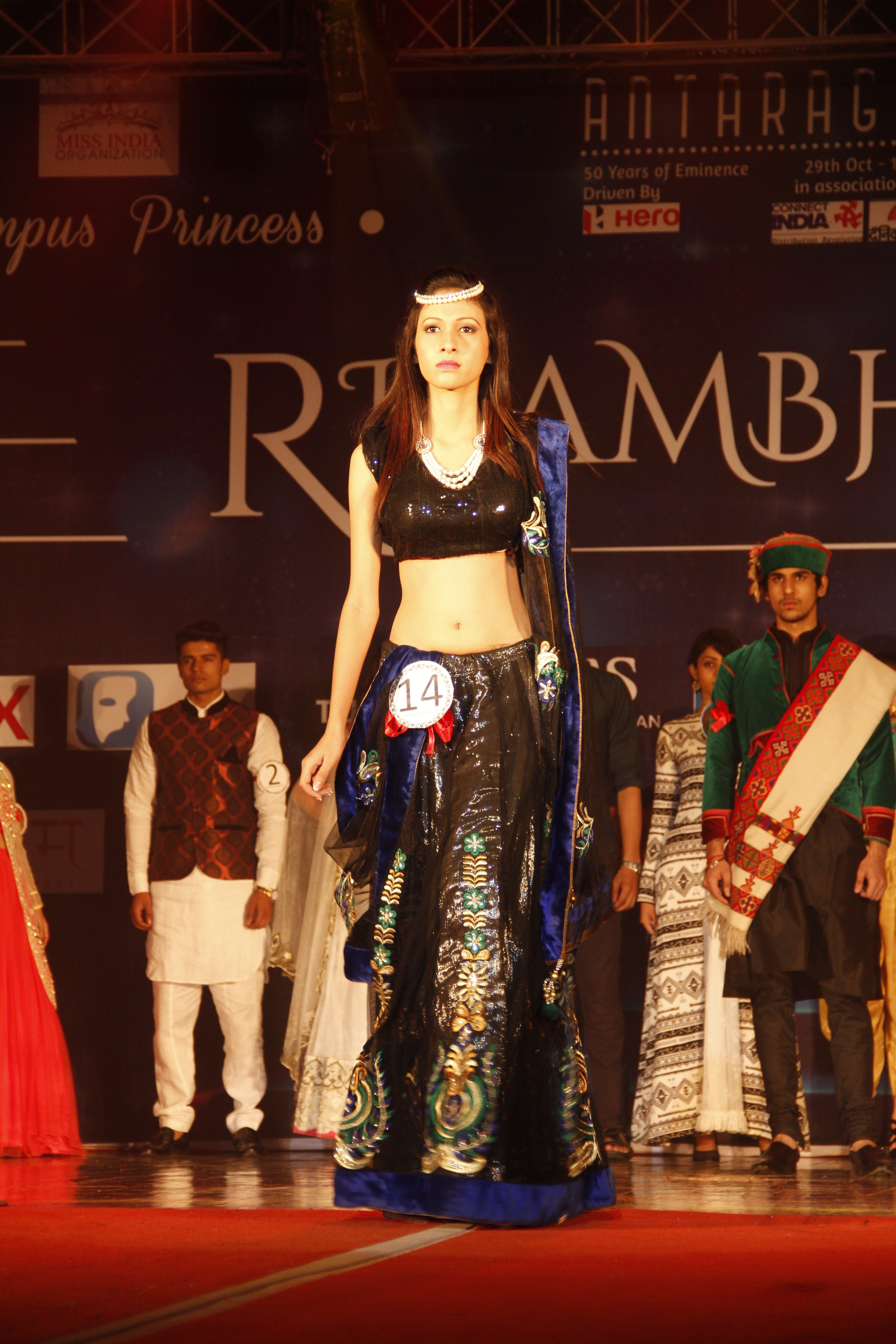

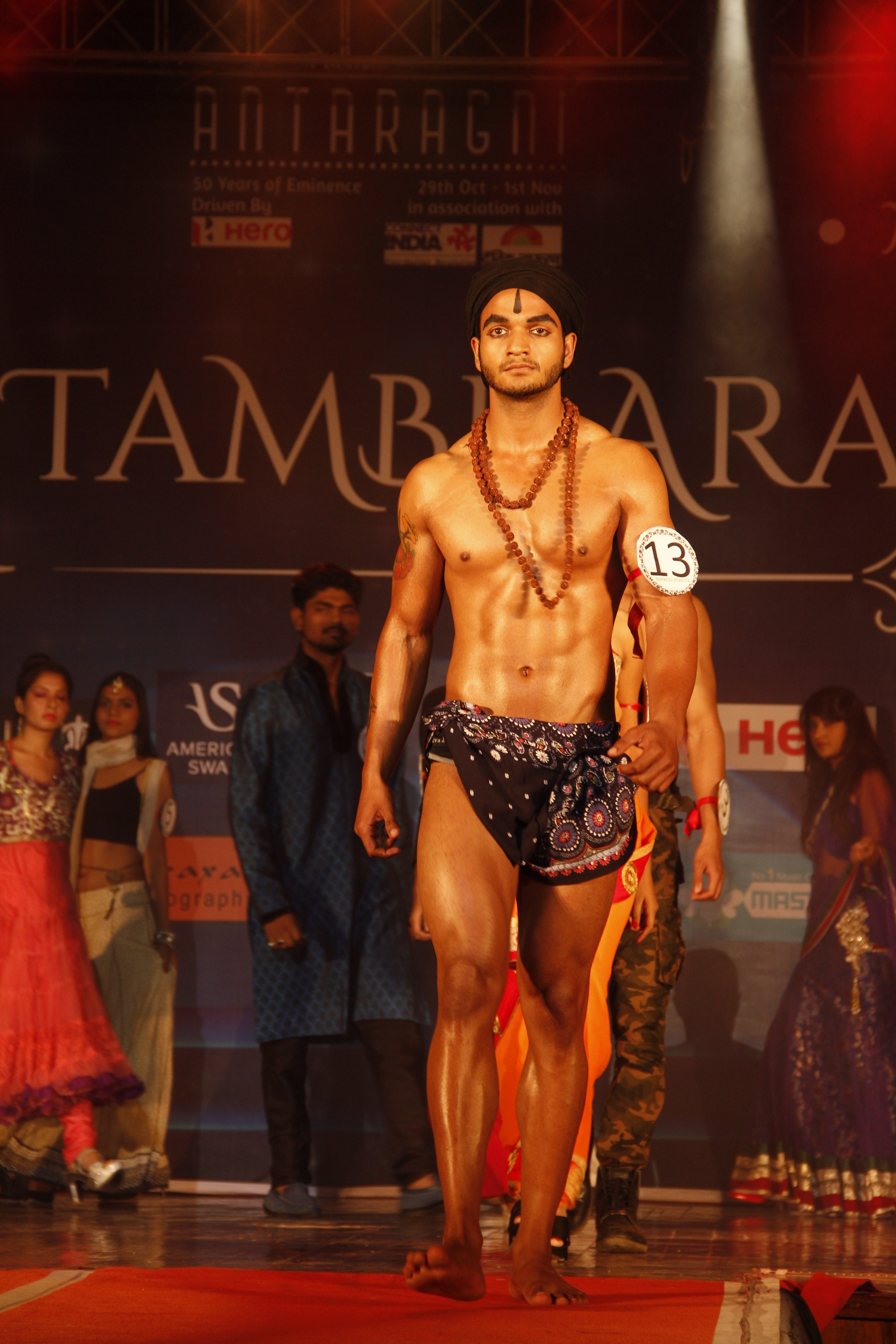

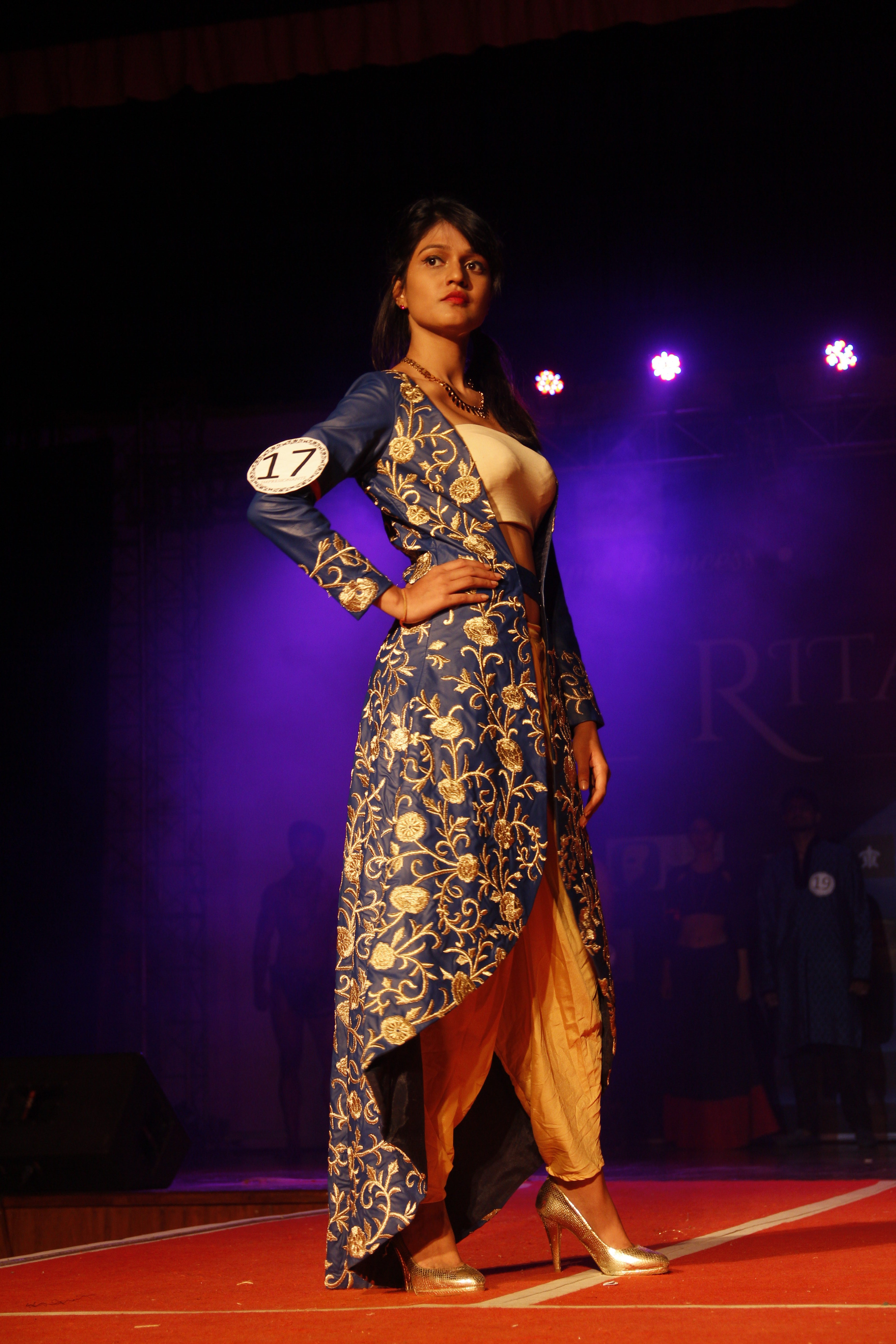

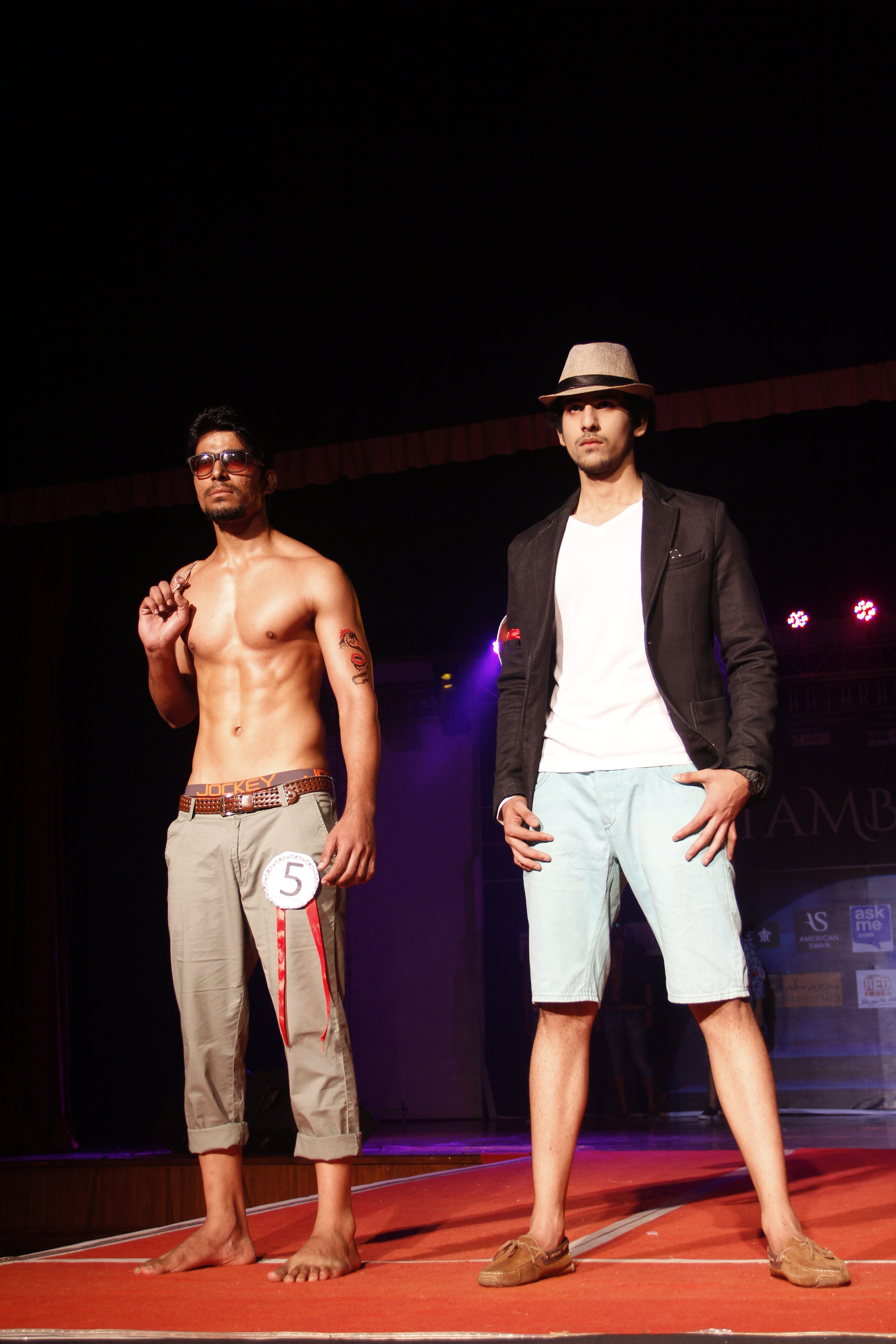

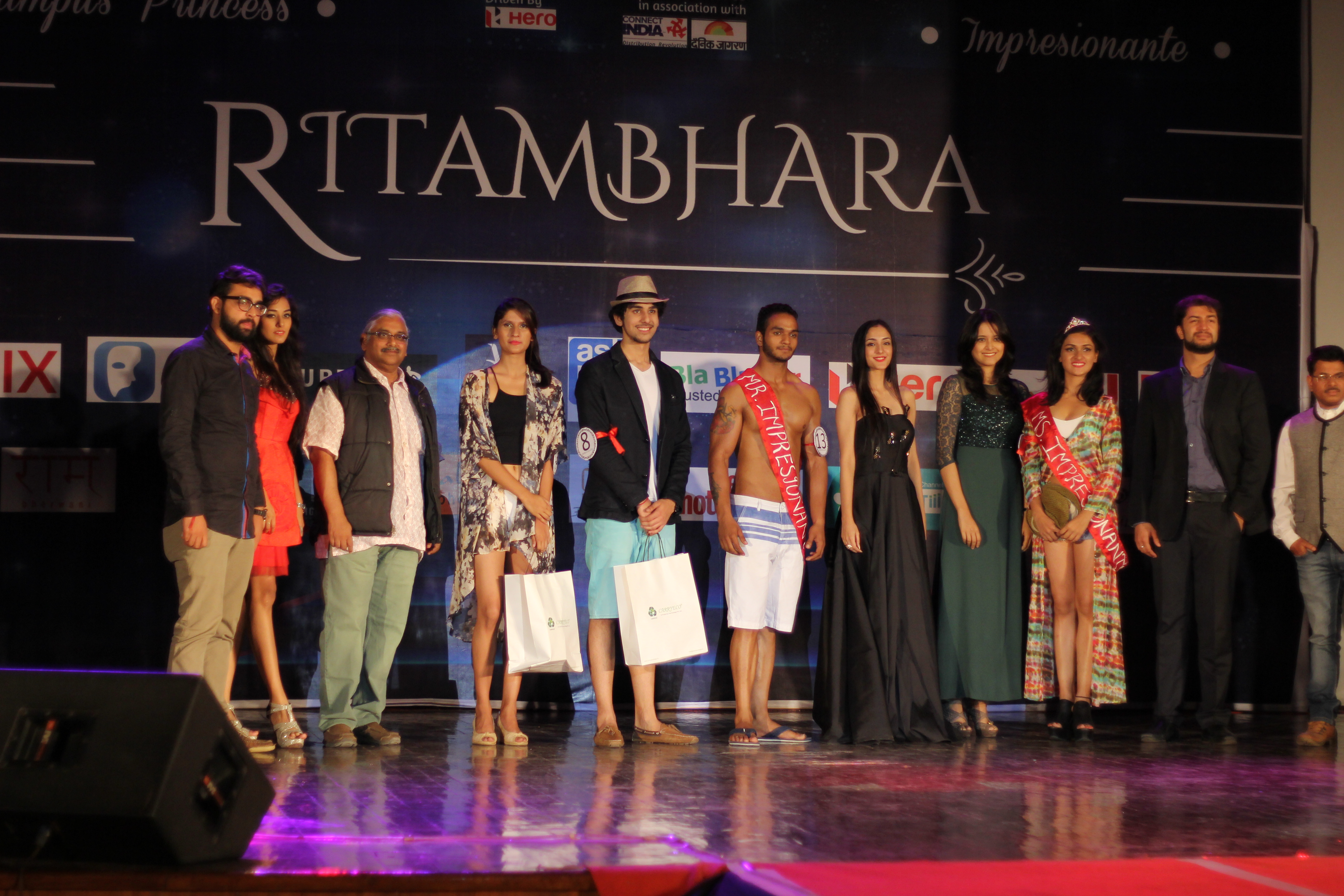

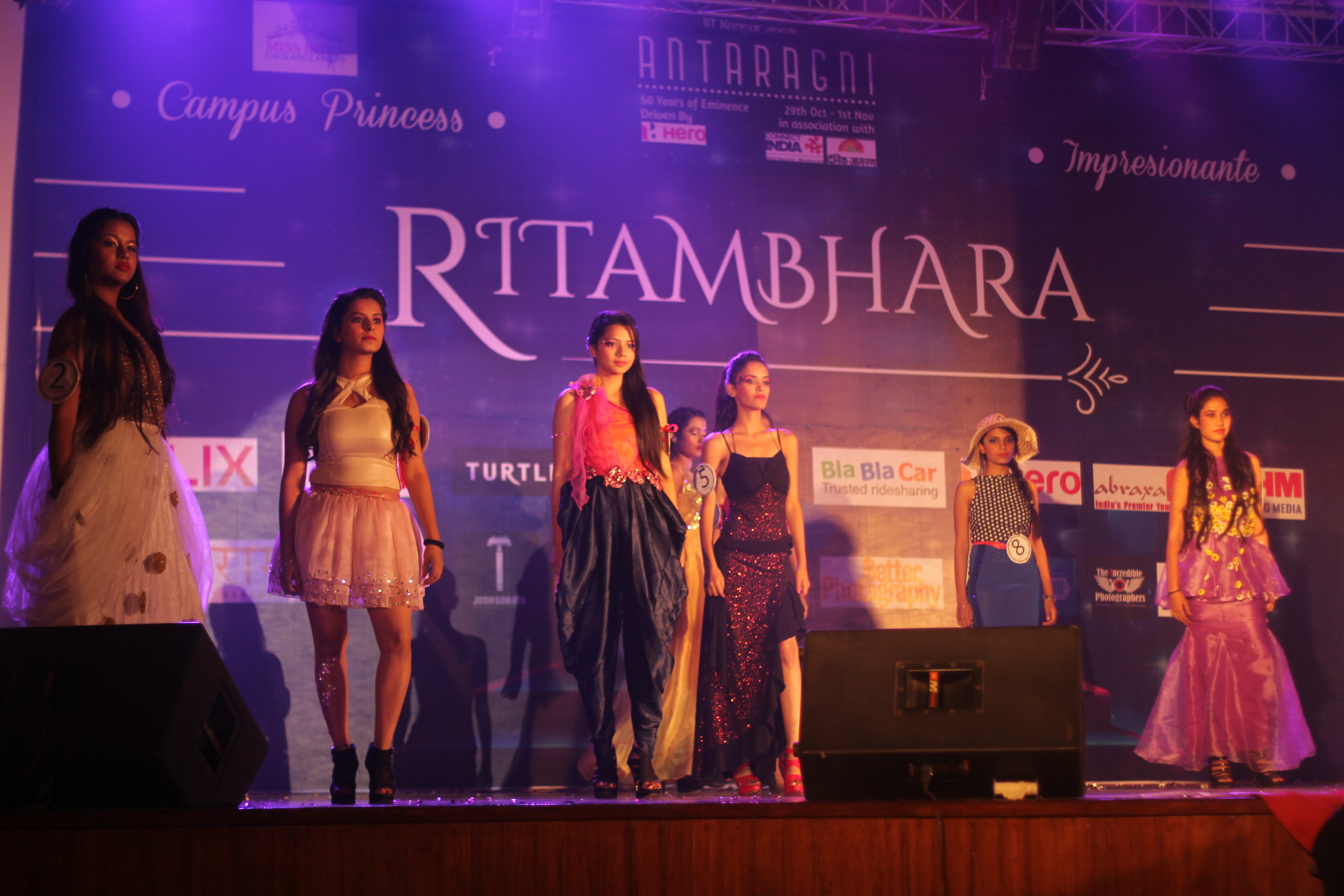

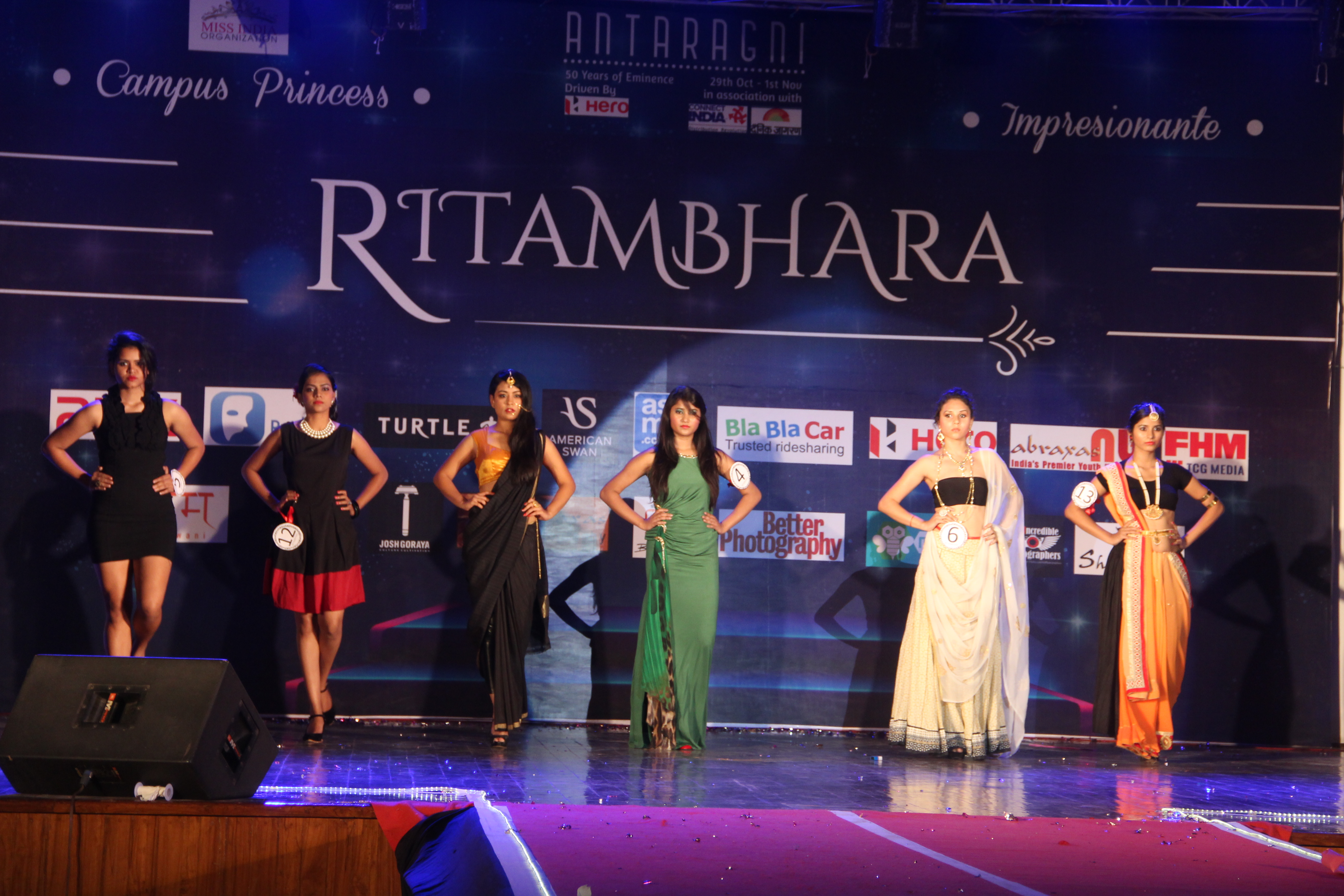
