= Everly (film) =

- Theatrical release poster
- Directed by: Joe Lynch
- Screenplay by: Yale Hannon
- Story by: Yale Hannon; Joe Lynch
- Produced by: Rob Paris; Andrew Pfeffer; Adam Ripp; Luke Rivett
- Starring: Salma Hayek
- Cinematography: Steve Gainer
- Edited by: Evan Schiff
- Music by: Bear McCreary
- Production companies: Crime Scene Pictures; Vega, Baby!; Anonymous Content
- Distributed by: RADiUS-TWC; Dimension Films
- Release dates: September 20, 2014 (Fantastic Fest); January 23, 2015 (iTunes); February 27, 2015 (United States)
- Running time: 92 minutes
- Country: United States
- Languages: English; Spanish; Japanese
- Budget: $10 million

Everly is a 2014 American action thriller film directed by Joe Lynch and written by Yale Hannon based on a story by Lynch and Hannon. The film stars Salma Hayek as the title character with Akie Kotabe, Jennifer Blanc, Masashi Fujimoto, Togo Igawa, Gabriella Wright, Caroline Chikezie, Laura Cepeda, and Hiroyuki Watanabe in supporting roles.

The film was released via iTunes on January 23, 2015, and received a limited theatrical release on February 27, 2015, by Dimension Films.

== Plot ==
Everly, trapped into sexual slavery and abused and assaulted while being forced to work for the brutal Japanese criminal overlord Taiko, is attacked in her apartment by Taiko's enforcers after he discovers that she has been working with a police officer to damage his organization. Although Taiko expected his men to kill her easily after torturing her, Everly retrieves a gun she had hidden in the toilet and manages to kill all of her attackers. Taiko then begins a sadistic game of toying with Everly, dispatching numerous hired killers and offering the other trafficked women in the building (which he presumably owns) a bounty if they manage to kill her. Meanwhile, Everly attempts to contact her mother Edith and young daughter Maisey to save them from other henchmen of Taiko and get them out of the situation alive, but her mother is being stubborn and refuses to leave without her.

After managing to evade Taiko's attackers for an extended period of time, Everly is captured by The Sadist, an assistant of Taiko's. He has her tied up and placed in a cage while he taunts and tortures her with battery and sulfuric acid, along with other corrosive liquids, at one point pouring water into her eyes while she screams in fear, believing it is acid. When The Sadist pours some of the corrosive liquid onto a rope binding her wrist, the rope starts disintegrating. Edith shoots and kills two of The Sadist's henchmen; in return, he begins forcing her mother to drink drain cleaner. The weakened rope breaks after Everly tugs on it; she kills two of the henchmen and wounds The Sadist. She rushes to help Edith, but is subdued by The Sadist, who attempts to stab her mother; Everly resurfaces, disarms The Sadist and forces him to drink one of his acids; he dies violently as Everly and Edith watch in horror.

It is revealed that Everly was a prisoner in the plush apartment after being kidnapped by Taiko four years earlier and forced into sexual slavery. She has had no contact with Edith or Maisey during that time, and her mother is confused and angry at the deadly situation they are suddenly thrust into. As Everly fights off the numerous attacks, some of the foes become more outlandish; originally, they are simply armed thugs, but the Sadist's team appear in costumes and plan for extravagant tortures. The final surge is from a group of what appears to be specialized troops or police officers.

Eventually, Edith is killed by a sniper hired by Taiko from the building across from the apartment on the orders of Taiko to punish Everly. When the sniper shoots a rocket-propelled grenade into the apartment, Taiko beheads him in anger, believing that he killed Everly, though she survives. Everly is finally subdued but manages to kill Taiko after his soldiers have left by stabbing him with his own sword. One of the Sadist's compatriots, the Masochist, attempts to slash Maisey before Everly kills him with a single headshot. Afterward, Everly reconciles with Maisey, who was under the protection of one of Everly's enslaved neighbors (who was eventually killed). The film closes with Everly seemingly succumbing to her wounds, but with Maisey still alive and potentially safe with the death of Taiko. However, immediately before the credits, there is audio of a beeping heart-monitor and gasp of breath to indicate that Everly has not died after all.

== Cast ==
- Salma Hayek as Everly
- Akie Kotabe as Dead Man
- Laura Cepeda as Edith
- Jennifer Blanc as Dena
- Togo Igawa as The Sadist
- Gabriella Wright as Anna
- Caroline Chikezie as Zelda
- Hiroyuki Watanabe as Taiko
- Jelena Gavrilović as Elyse
- Masashi Fujimoto as The Masochist
- Dragana Atlija as Lizzy
- Aisha Ayamah as Maisey

== Production ==
On February 1, 2012, Kate Hudson joined the cast. On May 10, 2013, Salma Hayek joined the cast to replace Hudson in the lead role.

== Release ==
Everly premiered at Fantastic Fest on September 20, 2014. The film was released on iTunes on January 23, 2015, and was released theatrically on February 27, 2015 by Dimension Films.

=== Critical reception ===
Everly received negative reviews from critics. The review aggregator website Rotten Tomatoes reported a 29% approval rating, with a rating average of 4.5/10, based on 55 reviews. The site's consensus states: "Everly benefits from Joe Lynch's stylish direction and Salma Hayek's starring work, but it's too thinly written and sleazily violent to fully recommend." On Metacritic, which assigns a rating out of 100 based on reviews from critics, the film has a score of 35 based on 16 reviews, indicating "generally unfavorable" reviews.
