= Daša Radosavljević =

Serbian dancer and beauty pageant titleholder

- Born: Daša Radosavljević; 14 June 1996 (age 30); Kragujevac, FR Yugoslavia
- Height: 1.71 m (5 ft 7 in)
- Beauty pageant titleholder
- Title: Miss Universe Serbia 2015
- Hair color: Brown
- Eye color: Brown
- Major competitions: Miss Serbia 2014 (1st Runner up); Miss Universe 2015 (Unplaced)

Daša Radosavljević (Serbian Cyrillic: Даша Радосављевић; born 14 June 1996) is a Serbian dancer and beauty pageant titleholder who was crowned the first runner-up of Miss Serbia 2014 and represented her country at the Miss Universe 2015 pageant.

== Personal life ==
Radosavljević was an active dancesport competitor. She took part in the World Sport Dancing Championships when she was eight, competing in the disco dance category. She has multiple national and Balkans titles in this event.

=== Miss Serbia 2014 ===
Radosavljević was crowned the first runner-up of Miss Serbia 2014 where she was representing the city of Kragujevac. Meanwhile, Marija Ćetković was crowned as Miss Serbia 2014 and represented Serbia at Miss World 2015. According to the rules of Miss Serbia competition, the winner is to represent Serbia at Miss World, while the first runner-up is to represent Serbia at Miss Universe.

== Miss Universe 2015 ==
As the winner of Miss Universe Serbia, Radosavljević represented Serbia at Miss Universe 2015 pageant but Unplaced.

Awards and achievements
Preceded by Anđelka Tomašević	Miss Universe Serbia; 2015	Succeeded by Ivana Trišić
