= Boyster =

French animated TV series

- Genre: Comedy; Adventure
- Created by: Frederic Azemar; Emmanuelle Fleury; Fabien Limousin
- Directed by: Damien Barrau; Fabien Limousin
- Voices of: Akie Kotabe; Rasmus Hardiker; Matthew Forbes; Rob Rackstraw; Jules de Jongh; Lizzie Waterworth
- Composers: Alexis Pecharman; Denis Vautrin
- Country of origin: France
- Original languages: French; English
- No. of seasons: 1
- No. of episodes: 52 (18 unaired in the U.S.)

Production
- Producers: Franck Ekinci; Camille Sorceau
- Editors: Bob Mittenthal; Michael Rubiner; Fabien Limousin; Marianne Barbier
- Running time: 22 minutes (11 minutes per segment)
- Production company: Je suis bien content

Original release
- Network: Disney XD; France 4
- Release: June 16, 2014 – May 28, 2015

Boyster (Molusco) is a French animated television series that premiered on Disney XD on June 16, 2014. The titular Boyster character is half human and half mollusk, and his name is a portmanteau of "boy" and "oyster."

== Plot ==
The series focuses on the adventures of a half-human, half-oyster mutant named "Boyster", who was born from a toxic spill and adopted by a pair of humans and raised with his shell brother Shelby. Naturally, Boyster has to keep his oyster side under wraps, but he will use his many oyster-esque abilities to save the day.

== Characters ==
=== Main ===
- Boyster Likowski (voiced by Akie Kotabe) is an 11-year-old human-oyster hybrid with the ability to spit pearls and stretch his limbs. He is shy and horrified that someone might discover his powers. In the series' theme song, it is shown that Boyster and his brother Shelby were originally normal animals before being mutated into their current forms by an oil spill; they were later found on the beach and then adopted by Lola and Eugene Likowski.
- Shelby Likowski (voiced by Matthew Forbes) is Boyster's clam twin brother. Unlike Boyster, he has the body of a clam with a humanoid face rather than being fully humanoid. Shelby is highly intelligent, almost never leaves his home, and prefers to watch television all day long, which is where he gets all his knowledge from. He is obsessed with the "Prestige and Passion" series and admires the theories of Charles Darwin.
- Rafik (voiced by Rasmus Hardiker) is Boyster's best friend. He is 11-year-old, and an overexcited kid. He is one of the only characters in the series to know Boyster's secret. He loves to act, make drama for any situation and often finds things funny even if they are not really funny. He gets jealous when Boyster spends time with someone else, and he is arrogant and boastful, always thinking he is the best even giving himself the nickname "Rafik the Magnificent".

=== Supporting ===
- Eugene Likowski is a botanist who is the adoptive father of Boyster and Shelby. He is overprotective of Boyster and would not want anything to happen to him.
- Lola Likowski (voiced by Jules de Jongh) is the adoptive mother of Boyster and Shelby. She is an ingenious person and she loves fixing cars and making objects.
- Alicia (voiced by Lizzie Waterworth) is Boyster's love interest. She is very rich and her parents are stingy and obsessed with money and want her to marry a billionaire at all costs. Alicia dreams of becoming an artist and loves drawing portraits of her beloved cat, Vanilla. Alicia is a nice girl, with a strong sense of integrity, who cannot stand being rejected. She likes Boyster a lot but does not suspect that he has a crush on her and, worse, that he has powers. She is around 11–13 years old.
- Ozzy (voiced by Rasmus Hardiker) is a bully at Boyster's school. A vain, idiotic and arrogant person, he loves hitting and putting people down, especially Boyster and Arthur. He seems to be in love with Alicia but obviously she does not love him due to his meanness. Ozzy has a lack of self-confidence and would like to be able to impress his two ruthless and muscular sisters by showing them that he can be as strong as them. He is described as being "ugly" by Rafik.
- Arthur (voiced by Rasmus Hardiker) is a socially inept nerd with a passion for the extraterrestrial. He is able to create sophisticated invents, such as an alien detector, and is a fan of Sherlock Holmes. He has a pet spider named Ursula.
- Mr. Marion "Teachinator" Pluss (voiced by Rob Rackstraw) is a teacher at Boyster's school. He is known as the strictest teacher at the school, and is usually seen angry or shouting. He has perceived robotic vision and the students call him the "Teachinator". In the episode of the same name, it is revealed that he only wished to please his late father, who was also a strict teacher.

== Series overview ==
Season	Episodes	Originally released	
Season	Episodes	First released	Last released
1	52	June 16, 2014	May 28, 2015

== Episodes ==
=== Season 1 (2014-2015) ===
No. overall	No. in season	Title	Written by	Original release date	Prod. code
1	3	"Supermollusk" "Supermollusque"	Fabien Limousin; Cédric Stephan	June 16, 2014	102a
2	1	"The Necklace" "Le collier"	Fabien Limousin	June 16, 2014	101a
3	4	"Teachinator" "Terminaprof"	Fabien Limousin; Cédric Stephan	June 17, 2014	102b
4	2	"The Alien" "L'alien"	Fabien Limousin	June 17, 2014	101b
5	6	"Shelby, the Art Lover" "Par amour de l'art"	Bob Mittenthal; Michael Rubiner	June 23, 2014	103b
6	10	"Skeleton" "Le squelette"	Joel Jessup	June 23, 2014	105b
7	7	"A Strange New Friend" "Un nouvei ami"	Fabien Limousin; Cédric Stephan	June 30, 2014	104a
8	9	"Musculo" "Muscle Boy"	Tim Dann; Neil Mossey	June 30, 2014	105a
9	5	"Love at First Sight" "Coup de foudre"	Fabien Limousin; Cédric Stephan	September 22, 2014	103a
10	8	"Go Fish!" "Sauvez Poissonou"	Ciaran Murtagh; Andrew Jones	September 22, 2014	104b
11	11	"Quiz Show No No" "La reine de quiz"	Ciaran Murtagh; Andrew Jones	September 29, 2014	106a
12	12	"Fish Humor" "Molusclown"	Joel Jessup	September 29, 2014	106b
13	15	"A Third Arm" "Troisième bras"	Fabien Limousin; Cédric Stephan	October 8, 2014	108a
14	17	"Pool Party!" "La piscine"	Dan Berlinka	October 8, 2014	109a
15	19	"Puffed Up" "Un look d'enfer"	Tim Bain	October 16, 2014	110a
16	13	"Marble Mischief!" "La fièvre des billes"	Nicolas Verpilleux	October 16, 2014	107a
17	21	"Free Gilly" "Sauvez Guili"	John Crane	November 10, 2014	111a
18	16	"The Studio Inferno" "Tournage infernal"	Fabien Limousin; Cédric Stephan	November 10, 2014	108b
19	27	"Girlster" "Molsuca"	Bob Mittenthal; Michael Rubiner	November 17, 2014	114a
20	18	"Video Star Vanilla" "Vanille vidéo star"	Davey Moore	November 17, 2014	109b
21	25	"Wings of Love" "L'amour donne des ailes"	Matithieu Choquet; Eve Pisler	May 18, 2015	113a
22	28	"Blackmailed!" "Démasqué !"	Frank Ekinci; Bob Mittenthal; Michael Rubiner	May 18, 2015	114b
23	22	"Local Hero" "Héros grâce à lui"	John Crane	May 19, 2015	111b
24	23	"Full Speed Ahead" "À toute vitesse"	Sébastien Guérout	May 19, 2015	112a
25	20	"Three Hours of the Condor" "Les trois heures du Condor"	Bob Mittenthal; Michael Rubiner	May 20, 2015	110b
26	24	"Boyster Pox" "Huîtrellose"	Ciaran Murtagh; Andrew Jones	May 20, 2015	112b
27	34	"The Stache" "La moustache"	Mélanie Duval	May 21, 2015	117b
28	26	"Bust a Move" "Le déménagement"	Doug Lieblich	May 21, 2015	113b
29	32	"Sneezy Art" "Un nez d'artiste"	Fabien Limousin; Cédric Stephan	May 26, 2015	116b
30	33	"Magic Rafik" "Rafik le magnifique"	Frank Ekinci; Cédric Stephan	May 26, 2015	117a
31	37	"Wavester" "Moluscondes"	Nicolas Verpilleux	May 27, 2015	119a
32	42	"Hand in Sticky Hand" "Trois jours de colle"	Thomas Barichella	May 27, 2015	121b
33	43	"It Takes a Thief" "Vol au-dessus d'un nid de Coco"	Bob Mittenthal; Michael Rubiner	May 28, 2015	122a
34	14	"Lab Coat Party" "Blouse party"	Matithieu Choquet; Léonie de Rubber	May 28, 2015	107b
35	29	"Pranks a Lot" "Dans ta farce !"	Ciaran Murtagh; Andrew Jones	N/A	115a
36	36	"Tough Hombre" "Moluscatch"	Bob Mittenthal; Michael Rubiner	N/A	118b
37	38	"MultiplOzzyty" "Vol de face"	Fabien Limousin; Cédric Stephan	N/A	119b
38	30	"Crustacean Invasion" "L'invasion des crustacés"	Scott Tuft	N/A	115b
39	39	"He's Got Legs" "Joue-la comme Coco !"	Bob Mittenthal; Michael Rubiner	N/A	120a
40	31	"Boyster Claus" "L'étrange Noël de Molusco"	Bob Mittenthal; Michael Rubiner	N/A	116a
41	45	"Snow Daze" "Vous avez dit blizzard ?"	John Crane	N/A	123a
42	44	"Pearl Before Swine" "Perles d'amour"	Bob Mittenthal; Michael Rubiner	N/A	122b
43	35	"It's Not Easy Being Clean" "Dur dur de nettoyer"	Adam Cohen	N/A	118a
44	48	"Superstition"	Suaëna Airault; Elise Trinh; Bob Mittenthal; Michael Rubiner	N/A	124b
45	49	"A Very Special Advisor" "La mairie en folie"	Emmanuel Leduc	N/A	125a
46	41	"Kitchen Nightmare" "La petite cuisine des horreurs"	Nicolas Verpilleux	N/A	121a
47	51	"Homecoming" "Retour au bercail"	Cédric Stephan	N/A	126
48	52	"Homecoming" "Retour au bercail"	Cédric Stephan	N/A	126
49	40	"Shelby Holmes" "Le club des détectives"	Cédric Stephan	N/A	120b
50	50	"Boysterclone" "Molusclone"	Nicolas Verpilleux	N/A	125b
51	47	"Now You See It" "Techno Coco"	Bob Mittenthal; Michael Rubiner	N/A	124a
52	46	"Rash Decision" "Ça gratte !"	Bob Mittenthal; Michael Rubiner	N/A	123b

== Awards and nominations ==
Year	Award	Category	Nominee	Result
2015	Annecy International Animated Film Festival	TV series	For "Teachinator"	Nominated
