= Akie Kotabe =

American actor (born 1980)

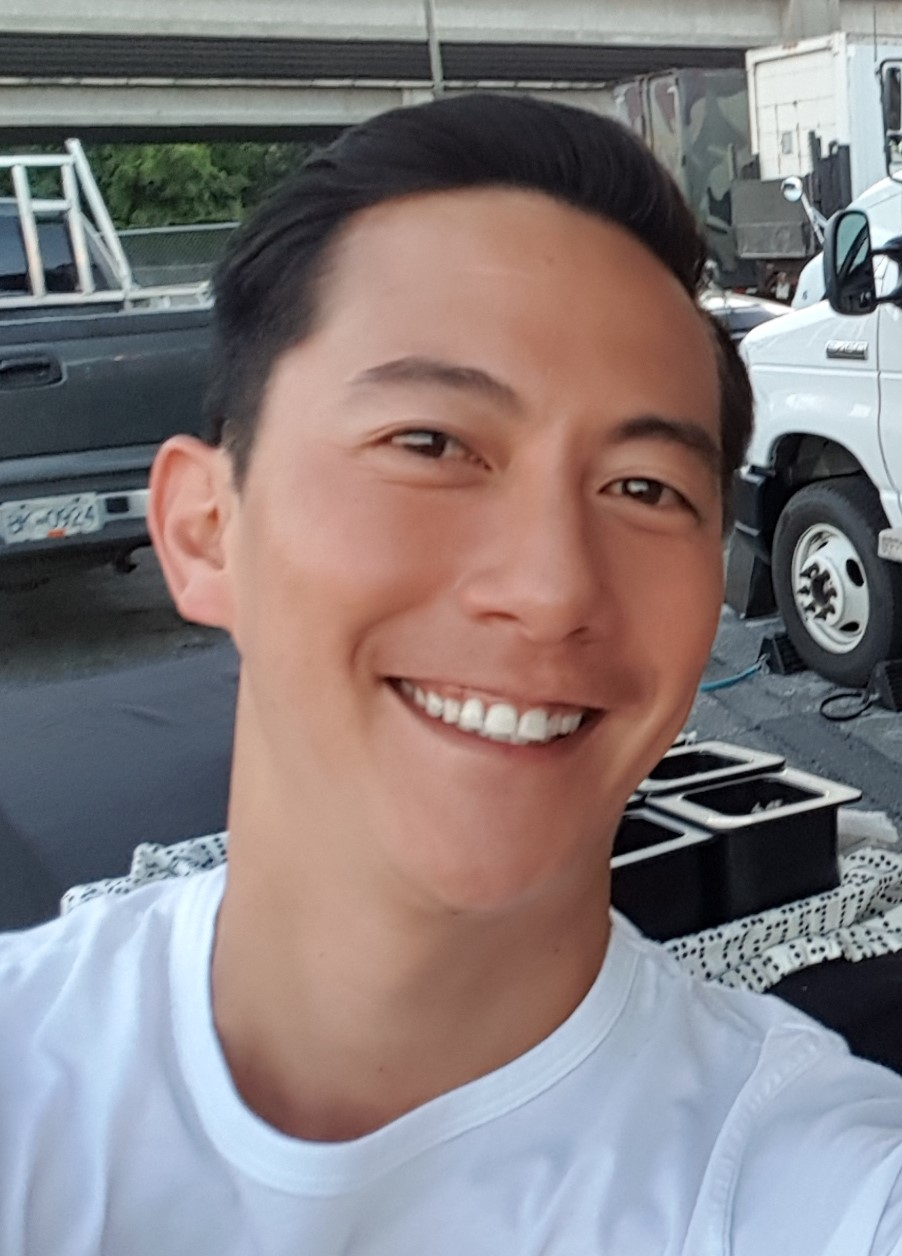
- Kotabe in 2017
- Born: Akihiro Lawrence Kotabe; July 18, 1980 (age 46); Lansing, Michigan, U.S.
- Education: University of California, Santa Barbara
- Occupation: Actor
- Years active: 2005–present

Akihiro Lawrence Kotabe (born July 18, 1980) is an American actor. His credits include playing Diego in Silo, Ben Nakamura in The Man in the High Castle, Dead Man in Everly, Meyers in The November Man, Eric in The Assets, Akira Takahashi in Mad Men, and Shingo in The Achievers. Kotabe also provides the voice of Kyan in the CBeebies animated series Go Jetters, the title character Boyster in the Disney XD animated series Boyster, as well as Conor in the podcast Passenger List. He was nominated for Best Actor at the 2020 Madrid International Film Festival for the neo-noir film, Clay's Redemption.

== Filmography ==
=== Film ===
Year	Title	Role	Notes
2006	The Achievers	Shingo	
2007	Paradise Hills	Barry	
2009	Midgets vs. Mascots	Deng Mann	
2009	Pornography: A Thriller	Jeremy/Adam	
2014	Jack Ryan: Shadow Recruit	Aide	
2014	The November Man	Meyers	
2015	Everly	Dead Man	
2016	Jason Bourne	Hub Tech	
2016	Arcadia	Jacob	
2016	Eliminators	Analyst	
2018	Another Day of Life	Friedkin / Student (VO)	
2019	Hobbs & Shaw	CIA Handler	
2020	Clay's Redemption	Clay	Nominated for Best Actor at the 2020 Madrid International Film Festival
2020	Wonder Woman 1984	Air Traffic Controller	
2021	Decrypted	Satoshi Nakamoto	
2021	Venom: Let There Be Carnage	Victim's Brother	
2022	The Batman	Lone Train Passenger	
2023	The Son	Mr. Yama	
2023	Gran Turismo	Akira Akiba	
2025	Cleaner	James Horsley	
2025	The Roses	Alan	

=== Television ===
Year	Title	Role	Notes
2005	Stacked	Male Customer	
2005	ER	Mako	
2006	Day Break	Honda Driver	2 episodes
2008	Terminator: The Sarah Connor Chronicles	Kendo	
2008	CSI: Miami	Johnny Young	
2008	Without a Trace	Todd	
2008	Ghost Whisperer	Attendant	
2010	Day One	Aki	Pilot
2010	Southland	Roommate	
2010	Mad Men	Akira Takahashi	
2011	All My Children	Distorted Voice	12 episodes
2012	Not Going Out: Children In Need Special	Mr. Namasaki	Episode: "Wogan"
2014	The Assets	Eric	4 episodes
2015	Humans	Dr. Ji Dae-Sun	
2014–2017	Boyster	Boyster (voice)	52 episodes
2015–2020	Go Jetters	Kyan (voice)	156 episodes
2016	Flowers	Shun's Father	
2016–2017	Teacup Travels	Fusaaki / Katsuyori / Tokiyori / Atsu / Ryuu	5 episodes
2018	The Man in the High Castle	Ben Nakamura	6 episodes
2019	Berlin Station	Sgt. Mark McClain	
2020	Avenue 5	Kitchen Worker	
2020	Incredible Ant	Xiao Yi, BOS Members (voice)	26 episodes
2021	The Falcon and the Winter Soldier	RJ	Episode: "New World Order"
2021	Invasion	Satoshi	3 episodes
2022	Breeders	Waiter	
2022	The Toys That Built America	Minoru Arakawa	
2023–2025	Silo	Diego	8 episodes
2023	The Wheel of Time	Turak's Voice	2 episodes
2024	Industry	Mitsubishi Executive	
2024	The Franchise	Nathan	
2025	Andor	Musk	2 episodes

=== Video games ===
Year	Title	Role
2011	L.A. Noire	Japanese Soldier
2012	The Secret World	Ricky Pagan
2013	Transformers Universe	Anomaly
2014	Fatal Frame: Maiden of Black Water	Kazuya Sakaki
2015	Anno 2205	Ville Jorgenson
2016	Homefront: The Revolution	Huojin Yang
2017	Horizon Zero Dawn	Ferl / Hashiv / Orn
2017	Need for Speed Payback	Aki Kimura
2018	Leisure Suit Larry: Wet Dreams Don't Dry	Richard / Everitt
2018	State of Mind	Simon
2019	Control	Additional Cast
2019	Terminator: Resistance	NPCs
2019	Dragon Raja	Z
2020	Cyberpunk 2077	Anthony Gilchrist
2020	The Complex	Drunk Investor
2021	Night Book	Pearce
2022	Horizon Forbidden West	Additional Voices
2023	Park Beyond	Alex
2023	Alan Wake II	Additional Voices
2023	Classified: France '44	Willard Cassady
2024	Terminator: Dark Fate - Defiance	Kenzo / Kondo
2024	Outcast: A New Beginning	Aghiton / Yunair / Additional Voices
2024	Rise of the Rōnin	Narrator / Shōin Yoshida
2024	Stellar Blade	D1G-g2r
2025	Assassin's Creed Shadows	Yagoro
2025	The Hundred Line: Last Defense Academy	Yugamu Omokage
