= Kargus =

- Directed by: Juan Miñón; Miguel Ángel Trujillo
- Written by: Juan Miñón; Miguel Ángel Trujillo
- Starring: Héctor Alterio; Laura Cepeda
- Cinematography: José Luis Martínez; Miguel Ángel Trujillo
- Music by: Pedro Luis Domingo
- Release date: 1981
- Language: Spanish

Kargus is a 1981 Spanish drama film written and directed by Juan Miñón and Miguel Ángel Trujillo, at their feature film debut.

The film was entered into the main competition at the 38th edition of the Venice Film Festival.

== Plot ==
A series of vignettes that begin at the Civil War and end at the Spanish Economic Miracle is interwoven with two separate abstractions:

1. Seeking a Utopia in the Gilbert Islands
2. A possible escape from the social order to "el otro lado"

In vignette 1, the train which is apparently going to Vizcaya? offers a possible escape route (to France?). In vignette 2, we see an escape from the Oppressive Social Services that want the change a family (from being hunter gatherers) to fit back into the state-sponsored social order. Vignette 3 focuses on a schoolroom in the 1950s and suggests that one can learn more from daydreaming than following the dry logic of the schoolmaster. Vignette 4 takes place at a Rapid Driving School, perhaps making fun of a girl who only looks at the inside of a vehicle and gets a rude awakening when she glimpses the outside of the car. Vignette 5 deals with graffiti removal where the technicians have to think long and loud about the political meanings to choose which graffiti they will remove and which they will allow.

== Cast ==
- Héctor Alterio
- Laura Cepeda
- Francisco Algora
- Luis Ciges
- María Vaner
- Gustavo Pérez de Ayala
- María Luisa Ponte
