= Romana Milutin Fabris =

Croatian painter, Miss Yugoslavia 1959

Romana Milutin Fabris (born 1941) is a Croatian painter, tapestry artist and beauty pageant winner. She won the Miss Yugoslavia title in 1959 and was featured in National Geographic magazine in 1962. She is known for works depicting Dubrovnik, its streets and landscape, and Mediterranean motifs.

== Early life and education ==
Milutin Fabris was born in Dubrovnik in 1941. She studied at the School of Applied Arts in Split and Zagreb, under the professors Kaštelančić, Tolić and Zuppa, and attended the Academy of Applied Arts in Belgrade. She studied fine art at the International Summer Academy of Fine Arts (Internationale Sommerakademie für bildende Kunst) in Salzburg, where she worked in the master workshop of the Austrian painter Oskar Kokoschka, whom she has cited as a formative influence alongside the Croatian painter Milovan Stanić.

== Career ==
Milutin Fabris held her first solo exhibition in 1965 at the Sponza Palace in Dubrovnik. She has since held more than 100 solo exhibitions in Croatia and abroad and taken part in more than 150 group exhibitions. Alongside painting she also works in tapestry, and her works are held in museums, galleries, private collections and public spaces. In her paintings she works mainly in tempera, oil and acrylic, with recurring motifs of Dubrovnik, sailboats, flowers and fish.

Her work has been the subject of critical writing by Luko Paljetak, one of Croatia's foremost poets and academics. Writing in Slobodna Dalmacija in 1996, Paljetak described her paintings of Dubrovnik as seen from a bird's perspective — a mosaic of colour and light that reveals the living interior life of the city beneath its rooftops. He noted her fauvist energy and the way her polychromatic surfaces transform Dubrovnik's streets, squares and houses into a vibrant, ever-changing composition.

In 2012, as part of the accompanying programme of the Dubrovnik Summer Festival and in collaboration with the State Archives in Dubrovnik, an exhibition of her paintings and tapestries titled Romana 50 Years Later was held at the Sponza Palace. In 2023 the Dubrovnik Summer Festival presented her exhibition Dubrovnik Rhapsody there. In 2024 she exhibited a series titled Homage to Dubrovnik as part of the SupetART programme at Hotel Supetar in Cavtat.

== Miss Yugoslavia ==
The five finalists of Miss Yugoslavia 1959, the year Milutin Fabris won the title

As a teenager, Milutin Fabris won the Miss Yugoslavia title in 1959. She was chosen after a reporter from the magazine Sport i Svijet photographed her school class, the pageant was held at the Hotel Metropol in Belgrade before a jury of artists, and her prize included a black-and-white television set, which she later sold to pay for her studies.

Her title was noted in National Geographic magazine in February 1962, where she appeared in an article about the Dalmatian coast by Gilbert M. Grosvenor. The article identified her as "Miss Yugoslavia" and featured her by name on pages 219 and 228.
