= The Goya Murders =

- Theatrical release poster
- Spanish: El asesino de los caprichos
- Directed by: Gerardo Herrero
- Screenplay by: Ángela Armero
- Produced by: Gerardo Herrero
- Starring: Maribel Verdú; Aura Garrido; Roberto Álamo; Ginés García-Millán; Daniel Grao; Ruth Gabriel
- Cinematography: David Omedes
- Edited by: Teresa Font
- Music by: Vanessa Garde
- Production companies: Tornasol Films; Los asesinatos de Goya AIE; Entre Chien et Loup
- Distributed by: A Contracorriente Films
- Release dates: 7 October 2019 (Sitges); 18 October 2019 (Spain)
- Countries: Spain; Belgium
- Language: Spanish

The Goya Murders (Spanish: El asesino de los caprichos) is a 2019 Spanish-Belgian crime thriller film directed by Gerardo Herrero and written by Ángela Armero which stars Maribel Verdú and Aura Garrido alongside Roberto Álamo, Ginés García-Millán, Daniel Grao and Ruth Gabriel.

== Plot ==
A couple of police investigators with different backgrounds and antagonistic personalities (Carmen Cobos and Eva González) track a serial killer who starts to leave a trail of crime scenes mirroring the scenes from Francisco Goya's Los caprichos in Madrid.

== Cast ==
- Maribel Verdú as Carmen Cobos
- Aura Garrido as Eva González
- Roberto Álamo as Comisario Julián Vargas
- Ginés García-Millán as Eduardo Gil
- Daniel Grao as Adrián Iglesias
- Ruth Gabriel as Alicia Márquez
- Aitor Fernandino as Mateo
- Oscar Pastor as Santos
- Laura Cepeda as Ana Mendieta
- Antonio Velázquez
- Laurent D'Elia
- Tamar Novas

== Production ==
A Spanish-Belgian co-production, the film was produced by Tornasol and Los asesinatos de Goya AIE alongside Entre Chien et Loup, with the participation of RTVE and Movistar+ and support from ICAA and the Madrid and Navarra regional administrations. It was shot in Madrid, Pamplona and Brussels.

== Release ==
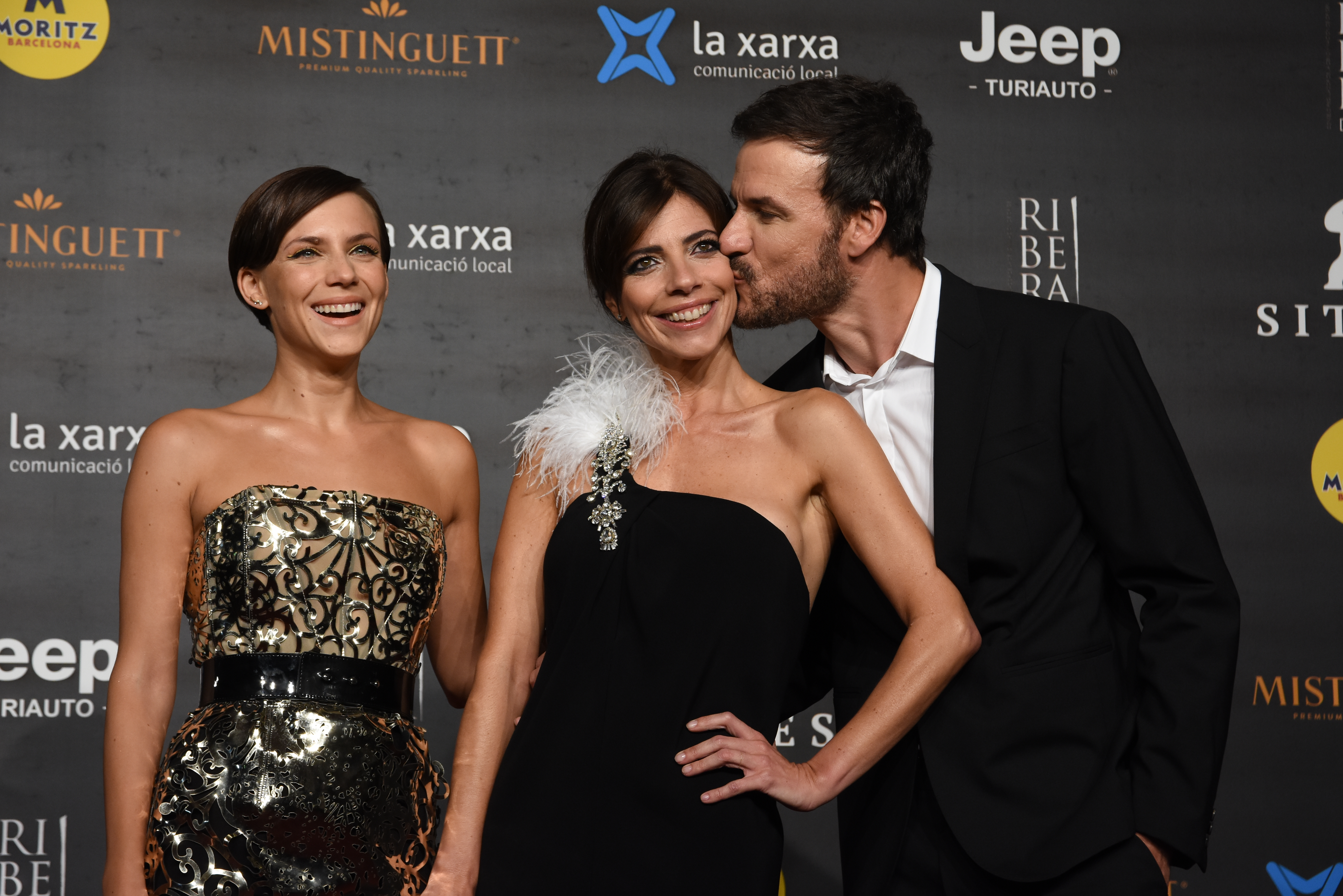
Aura Garrido, Maribel Verdú, and Daniel Grao during the presentation of the film at the 2019 Sitges Film Festival.

The film screened out of competition at the 52nd Sitges Film Festival in October 2019. Distributed by A Contracorriente Films, The Goya Murders was theatrically released in Spain on 18 October 2019.

== Reception ==
Raquel Hernández Luján of HobbyConsolas scored 58 out of 100 points ("so-so"), considering that "its anticlimactic script squanders a visually appealing" premise, assessing the Verdú and Garrido duo to be the best thing about the film, while citing the focus on a personal debacle instead of the police subplot, the characters making stupid decisions and the "disappointing" ending as the worst elements about it.

Mireia Mullor of Fotogramas rated the film 2 out of 5 stars, highlighting the tandem formed by Verdú and Garrido as the best thing about it, while resenting the inability to deliver "anything more than a cliché-filled thriller".

Francisco Marinero of El Mundo's Metrópoli scored 2 out of 5 stars citing the presence of very skilled performers as a positive point, while pointing out at "a contrived plot with countless clichés of the genre" as a negative point.

Janire Zurbano of Cinemanía gave the film 3 out of 5 stars, considering that it "is predictable from its approach to the composition of its characters", yet it manages to entertain, "while the talent of the Verdú-Garrido tandem does the rest".

Javier Ocaña of El País underscored the film to be "entertaining, it has a good pace and some interesting points" yet, in addition to certain unevenness in the supporting performances, the result falls short because of the stereotypes and the plot predictability.

== See also ==
- List of Spanish films of 2019
