= Ivana Trišić =

Serbian beauty pageant titleholder

- Ивана Тришић
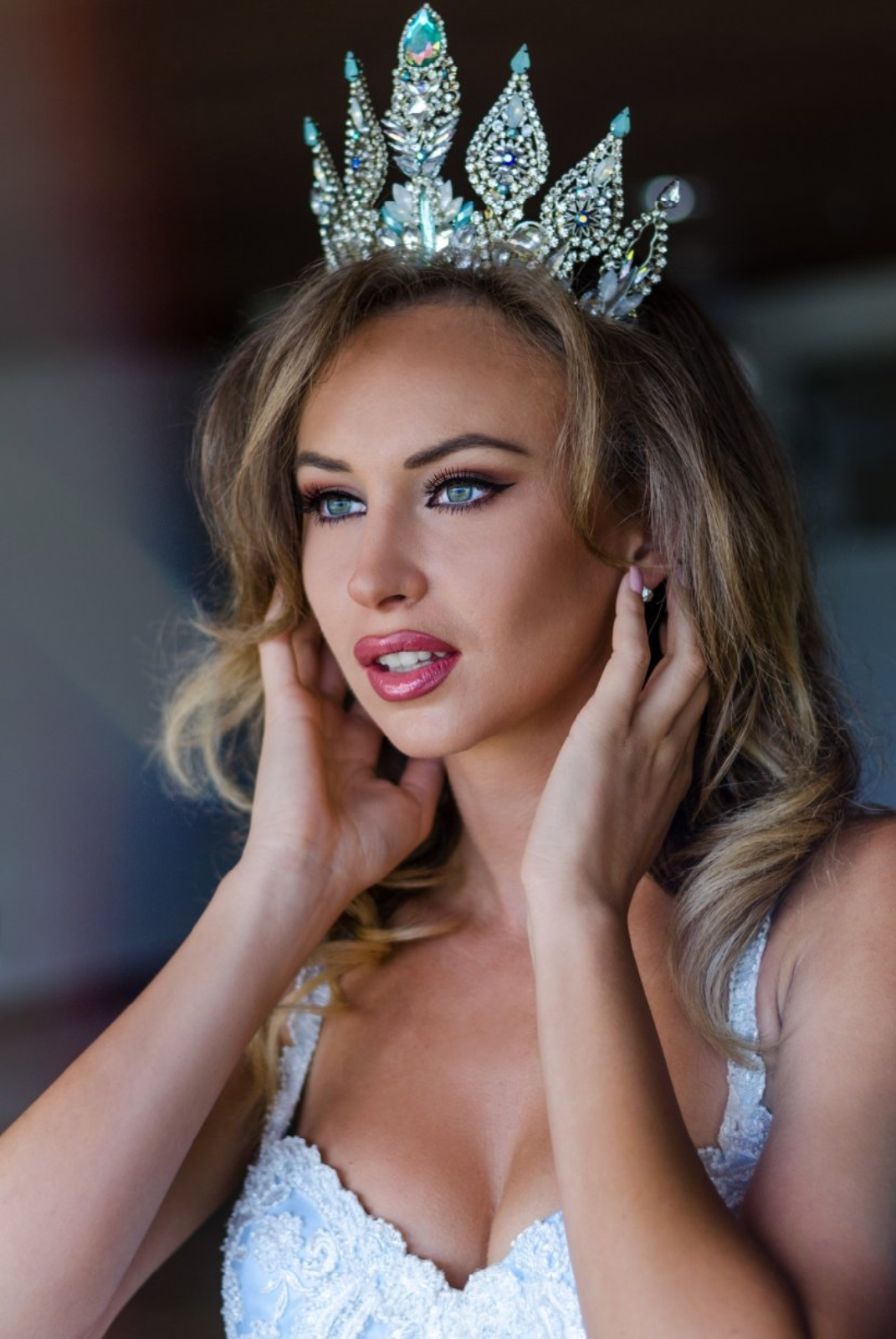
- Beauty pageant titleholder
- Title: Miss Serbia 2017; Miss Universe Serbia 2024
- Major competitions: Miss Serbia 2017 (Winner); Miss World 2018 (Unplaced); Miss Universe Serbia 2024 (Winner); Miss Universe 2024 (Top 30)

Ivana Trišić (/ˈtrɪsɪk -sɪtʃ/; Serbian Cyrillic: Ивана Тришић) is a Serbian beauty pageant titleholder who was crowned Miss Serbia 2017 and competed at the Miss World 2018 pageant in Sanya, China. She later earned the title of Miss Universe Serbia 2024 and represented her country at Miss Universe 2024.

== Pageantry ==
Miss World 2018

In 2017, Trišić entered and won the Miss Serbia 2017 national competition, which granted her the opportunity to represented her country at the Miss World pageant the following year. She represented Serbia at the Miss World 2018 pageant held in Sanya, China, where she was unplaced, with Vanessa Ponce de León of Mexico being the winner.

Miss Universe 2024

In 2024, Trišić earned the title of Miss Universe Serbia 2024, becoming the first Serbian representative at the pageant since Daša Radosavljević in 2015. She competed at the Miss Universe 2024 competition in Mexico City where she placed in the Top 30, becoming the first Serbian to reach the semifinals since 2003, when Sanja Papić finished as the 3rd Runner-Up to Amelia Vega of the Dominican Republic as Miss Serbia and Montenegro.

== Films ==
Name	director	Role	Year
1932	Shane Ries	Soup line person	2024
Amor En Toda La cara	Gerald B. Fillmore	Daryna	2024
The Modelizer	Keoni Waxman	model	2023
Altered Perceptions	Jorge Ameer	Girl in The Bar	2023
Ape vs. Monster	Marc Gottileb	Activist	2023

== Video games ==
Name	Director	Role	Year
Dark Mean City	Norbertio Sander	Darya	2024

Awards and achievements
Preceded by Anđelija Rogić	Miss World Serbia; 2018	Succeeded by Sanja Lovčević
Preceded by Daša Radosavljević	Miss Universe Serbia; 2024	Succeeded by

== Official Sites ==
- https://www.instagram.com/ivannatrisic/?hl=es ( Instagram)
- https://www.facebook.com/ivana.trisic.5/photos?locale=es_LA ( Facebook)
