= Dina Džanković =

Miss Serbia and Montenegro 2005 (born 1986)

- Born: Dina Džanković; 27 October 1986 (age 39); Novi Pazar, SR Serbia, Yugoslavia
- Education: Interior Design
- Occupations: Model, interior architect, fashion designer
- Known for: 2005 Miss Serbia and Montenegro
- Spouse: Mirsad Türkcan (m. 2005; div. 2012)
- Children: 3

Dina Džanković (Serbian: Дина Џанковић; born 27 October 1986) is a Serbian-Bosniak beauty pageant titleholder, who won the title of 2005 Miss Serbia and Montenegro on 18 December 2005. She is the last person to have this title due to the dissolution of the former State Union of Serbia and Montenegro in 2006. Džanković is an interior architect; however, she currently works as a model and fashion designer.

She was married to Mirsad Türkcan, the first Turkish basketball player to play in the NBA and they have three children together; two girls, Naba and Karia, and a boy, Nusret, who is named after his paternal grandfather. They divorced in 2012. Her former sister-in-law is Emina Jahović, Türkcan's sister.

== Miss World 2005 ==
Džanković competed at the Crown of Beauty Theatre in Sanya, People's Republic of China on 10 December 2005.
