= Dragana Atlija =

Serbian model and actress

Dragana Atlija (born 14 October 1986 in Knin, SFR Yugoslavia) is a Serbian actress, model and beauty pageant titleholder. She was crowned Miss Serbia 2008.

== Personal life ==
Atlija was born in Knin, Croatia (then part of SFR Yugoslavia), and raised in Belgrade. She studied Stock Exchange at R&B College International and speaks several languages: Serbo-Croatian, English, Spanish and Italian.

== Modeling and Miss Serbia ==
Atlija acted as a model at Miss Global Beauty Queen 2008 in China. She won the title "Miss Bikini charm" at Miss Body Beautiful 2008, and in the same year won Miss Serbia 2008 and represented the country at Miss Universe 2009 in Nassau, Commonwealth of the Bahamas.

== Acting ==
Since 2014 she has also worked as an actress. Her first role was as a Tennis player in the Action-drama film 3 Days to Kill. This role was followed by a cameo stint as a Shot girl in the action-crime thriller film The November Man. Her first leading role came with the role as Lizzy in the action-thriller Everly. She next portrayed Shiba in a supporting role of Ironclad: Battle for Blood.

=== Filmography ===
- Everly (2014) as Lizzy
- The November Man (2014) as Shot girl
- Ironclad: Battle for Blood (2014) as Shiba
- 3 Days to Kill (2014) as Tennis woman
