= Leska =

Leska may refer to:

== Places ==
- Leskë, a village in Albania
- Leska, Kyustendil Province, a village in Bulgaria
- Leska, Croatia, a village near Delnice

== People ==
- Anna Leska (1910-1998), Polish pilot, one of three Polish woman pilots to fly in the British Air Transport Auxiliary
