= Anđelija Rogić =

Serbian model

- Born: 1994 (age 31–32)
- Occupations: Dancer, fashion model

Anđelija Rogić (born 1994 in Užice, Serbia) is a Serbian dancer, fashion model and beauty pageant titleholder who represented Serbia at the Miss World 2017 contest which was held in Sanya, China. She is studying pedagogy at Belgrade University, works as a fashion model and performs with a folklore dance group. As Miss Serbia, Rogić performed a dance number in the talent portion of the show.
