= McCallion =

McCallion is a surname. Notable people with the surname include:

- Devi McCallion, (born 1991), Canadian electronic musician
- Eddie McCallion (born 1979), Northern Irish footballer
- Elisha McCallion (born 1982), Northern Irish politician
- Enda McCallion (born 1967), Irish film director
- Hazel McCallion (1921–2023), Canadian mayor
- Mac McCallion (1950–2018), New Zealand rugby union coach
- Marcus McCallion (born 1971), English graphic designer and typographer
- Seamus McCallion, (born 1964), Irish rugby league player
