= Milica Jelić =

Serbian beauty queen

- Born: Milica Jelić; 1990 (age 35–36); Belgrade, Yugoslavia
- Height: 6 ft 1 in (1.85 m)
- Beauty pageant titleholder
- Title: Miss Serbia 2010
- Hair color: Brown
- Eye color: Brown
- Major competitions: Miss Serbia 2009 (Top 10); Miss Serbia 2010 (Winner); Miss World 2010 (Unplaced)

Milica Jelić (born 1990) is a Serbian journalist and beauty pageant titleholder who was crowned Miss Serbia 2010 and later represented Serbia in the Miss World 2010 pageant held in Sanya, China where she was unplaced. She previously competed in the Miss Serbia 2009 competition where she placed in the Top 10. She dealt with the Latin-American dance, volleyball and swimming.
