= Milica Vukliš =

Serbian model

Milica Vukliš (born 18 June 1993 in Belgrade) is a Serbian model and beauty pageant titleholder who was crowned Miss Serbia 2014 and represented Serbia at Miss World 2014 contest in London. At Miss World 2014 she won 4th place in the Sports & Fitness challenge event and placed in the top 27 in Beauty With a Purpose.
