= Anja Šaranović =

Serbian beauty queen (born 1989)

Anja Šaranović Zeković
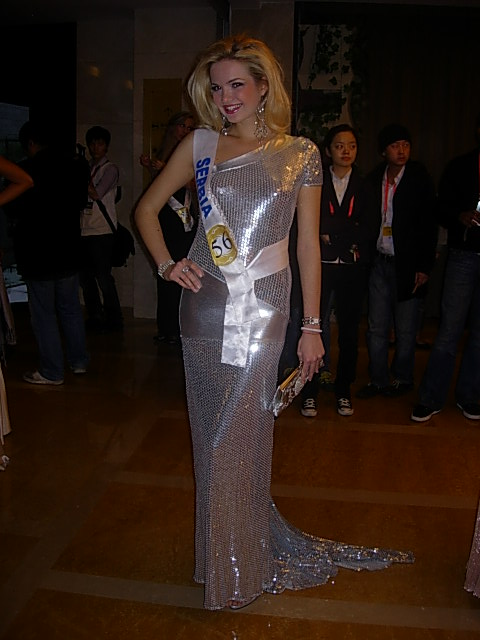
- Born: Anja Šaranović Zeković; 12 September 1989 (age 37); Kraljevo, Yugoslavia
- Beauty pageant titleholder
- Hair color: Blonde
- Eye color: Blue
- Major competitions: Miss Kraljevo (winner); Miss Serbia Universe 2010; Miss International 2010 (Top 15); Miss Universe 2011

Anja (Serbian: Aња Шарановић, born 12 September 1989 in Kraljevo, Yugoslavia) is a Serbian model and beauty pageant titleholder who represented her country in Miss International 2010 and was represented in the 2011 Miss Universe pageant.

== Personal life ==
Šaranović studied Human resources at University of Belgrade's Faculty of Security Studies. She speaks English, Russian and Italian in addition to her native Serbian, and is actively engaged in athletics and swimming. For seven years she attended acting school in Belgrade and started her modeling career at seventeen, participating in Belgrade Fashion Week. In June 2017, Šaranović married professional basketball player Dragan Zeković. Anja was one of fourteen finalist of Competition in Oratory which was held on 27 January 2011 at the Belgrade Law School.

== Miss Serbia 2010 ==
As Miss Vrnjacka Banja Anja got a chance to participate in Miss Serbia 2010 pageant where she was chosen to represent Serbia at Miss Universe 2011.

== Miss International 2010 ==
Prior to her participation in Miss Universe 2011, Šaranović was the official representative of her country to the 2010 Miss International pageant held in Chengdu, where she placed as one of the Top 15 semifinalists of the competition, Šaranović took sixth place and was the highest ranked contestant from Europe. That was first placement for Serbia after separation from Montenegro and the second placement for Serbia since the Miss International competition started; the first was in 2005 when Sanja Miljanić representing Serbia and Montenegro finished in the top 12.

== Miss Universe 2011 ==
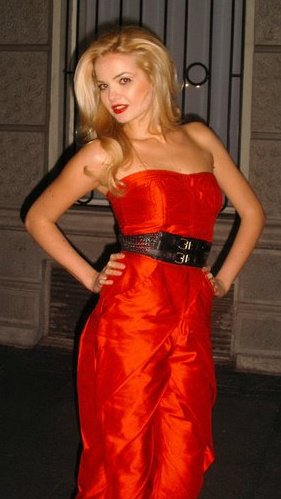
Serbia Anja Šaranović-4

Šaranović, represented her country in the Miss Universe 2011, the 60th edition of the Miss Universe pageant, which was held at the Credicard Hall in São Paulo, Brazil on 12 September 2011 but didn't make in top 15.

Awards and achievements
Preceded by Lidija Kocić	Miss Serbia; 2011	Succeeded by Branislava Mandić
