= Mirjana Božović =

Serbian model

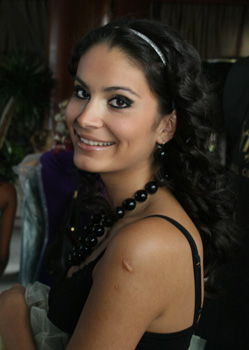
- Born: Mirjana Božović; 1987 (age 37–38); Lajkovac, Yugoslavia
- Beauty pageant titleholder
- Title: Miss Serbia 2007

Mirjana Božović (born 1987) is a Serbian model and beauty pageant titleholder. She was the first official "Miss Serbia," in 2007. She represented Serbia in Miss World 2007 in Sanya, China. She studied Civil Engineering with the intention of having her own engineering company.

In 2010, Božović appeared on the reality TV show Serbian Farm.
