= Vedrana Grbović =

Serbian model (born 1987)

Vedrana Grbovic
- Born: 14 December 1987 (age 38); Belgrade, Yugoslavia
- Height: 175
- Beauty pageant titleholder
- Title: Miss Serbia & Montenegro 2006
- Hair color: Brown
- Eye color: Hazel
- Major competitions: Miss Serbia 2006; Miss World 2006

Vedrana Grbović (Serbian Cyrillic: Ведрана Грбовић; born December 14, 1987) is a Serbian model and beauty pageant titleholder who won the title of Miss Serbia 2006 and represented her country at Miss World 2006. She graduated from the Curtin University of Technology with a BCom in Marketing and Advertising in 2009 and went on to complete her MSc in International Marketing and Business Development at SKEMA Business School in France in 2012. Vedrana has been the director of marketing agency Fresca Viva Pty Ltd since 2007.

== Early life ==
Grbovic was born in Belgrade, although she and her family would later move to Australia. She went on to appear in fashion shows in Belgrade, Perth, Los Angeles, Greece, and Italy. She won the titles of Miss Prom 2004 and Miss Earth Australia (W.A.) 2005 and has appeared in many television shows in Serbia, as well as music video clips and television advertisements.

She is a professionally trained dancer and actress, although she graduated with a degree in marketing and advertising.

== Miss Serbia & Montenegro ==
In 2006, then a Curtin University student, Vedrana was named Miss World Serbia & Montenegro.

== Community work ==
Vedrana is an active contributor and participant in the Serbian community events in Australia. She is actively engaged in and supports community events organised by the Serbian Orthodox Church. Vedrana also contributed to implementation of Hopman Cup in 2008.
