= Ana Vrcelj =

Serbian beauty queen

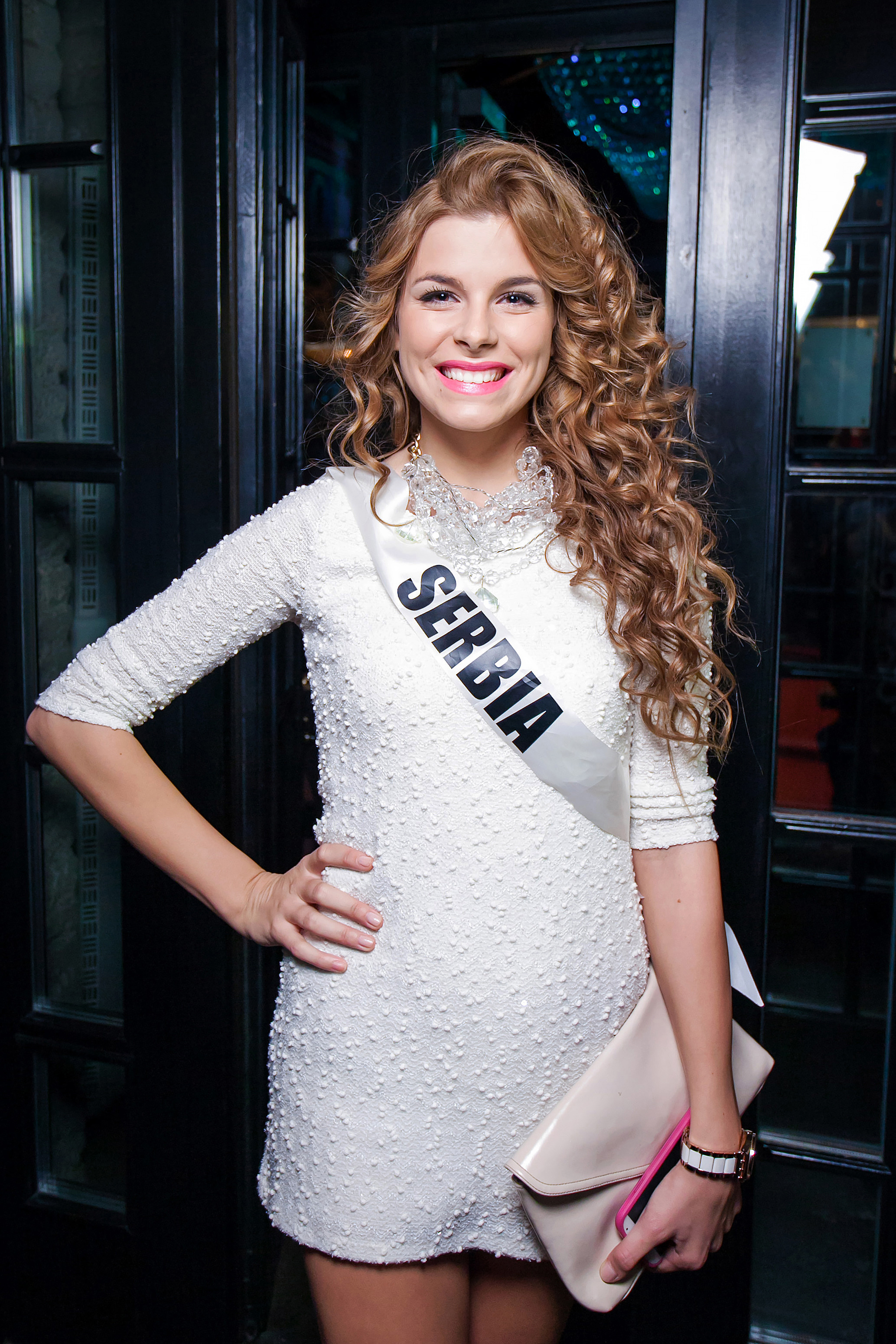
- Born: Ana Vrcelj; October 23, 1993 (age 32); Benkovac, Croatia
- Height: 1.79 m (5 ft 10 1/2 in)
- Beauty pageant titleholder
- Title: Miss Serbia Universe 2013
- Hair color: light brown
- Eye color: brown
- Major competitions: Miss Serbia 2012 (2nd runner-up); Miss Universe 2013 (Unplaced)

Ana Vrcelj (Serbian Cyrillic: Ана Врцељ; born 1993) is a Croatian-Serbian model and beauty pageant titleholder who placed 2nd runner-up at Miss Serbia 2012 and represented Serbia at the Miss Universe 2013.

== Designations ==
Nikolina Bojić was crowned Miss Serbia 2013 but was dethroned after it was revealed that she was married. Aleksandra Doknić (previously Miss Serbia 2013 for Miss Universe) took her place as Serbia's representative for Miss World, while Vrcelj became Serbia's representative for Miss Universe.

== Miss Universe 2013 ==
Vrcelj represented Serbia at Miss Universe 2013 in Moscow, Russia; she failed to place in the semifinals.

Awards and achievements
Preceded by Branislava Mandić	Miss Universe Serbia; 2013	Succeeded by Anđelka Tomašević
