= Anđelka Tomašević =

Serbian model and beauty pageant titleholder

- Born: 6 July 1993 (age 33); Zubin Potok, FR Yugoslavia
- Height: 1.74 m (5 ft 8 1/2 in)
- Beauty pageant titleholder
- Title: Miss Earth Serbia 2013; Miss Universe Serbia 2014; Miss Internet Serbia 2013
- Hair color: Light brown/blonde
- Eye color: Blue
- Major competitions: Miss Earth 2013 (Top 8); Miss Universe 2014 (Unplaced)

Anđelka Tomašević (Serbian Cyrillic: Aнђeлка Томашевић; born 6 July 1993) is a Serbian model and beauty pageant titleholder. She represented Serbia in Miss Earth 2013 pageant in Muntinlupa, Metro Manila, Philippines and also she represented her country at the Miss Universe 2014 pageant but did not place.

== Early and personal life ==
Tomašević was born on 6 July 1993 in Zubin Potok, FR Yugoslavia. She has an elder sister, Milica, who was Miss Kosovo and Metohija 2011. Tomašević is studying at the Faculty of Hotel Management and Tourism in Belgrade. She currently resides in Belgrade. Tomašević won the Miss internet award in the Miss Serbia 2013 competition, and became Miss Universe Serbia 2014. Her hobbies include sports, acting, dancing and reading. She also has modeling experience, and has participated in several humanitarian fashion shows and Serbia Fashion Week.

== Pageantry ==
=== Miss Earth 2013 ===
As the official representative of her country to the 2013 Miss Earth pageant, Tomašević won the Miss GLNG award and placed in the top 15 in the preliminary swimsuit and resort wear competitions. She placed in the top 8 in the Miss Earth 2013 final.

=== Miss Universe 2014 ===
Tomašević represented Serbia at Miss Universe 2014. Although considered to be a strong candidate by many, she failed to place in the top 15.

Awards and achievements
Preceded by Ana Vrcelj	Miss Universe Serbia; 2014	Succeeded by Daša Radosavljević
Preceded by Tijana Rakic (2010)	Miss Earth Serbia; 2013	Succeeded by TBA
