= Miss Serbia =

Beauty contest

Miss Srbije Organization
- Formation: 2006
- Type: Beauty pageant
- Headquarters: Belgrade
- Location: Serbia
- Members: Miss World; Miss International; Miss Earth
- Official language: Serbian
- President: Vesna de Vinča
- Website: http://www.missyu.rs/

Miss Serbia (Serbian: Miss Srbije) is a national beauty pageant in Serbia.

== President ==
Vesna De Vinča president of Miss Serbia is a TV author, journalist, TV director, editor, and screenwriter. Since 1993, she has held the position of TV programme editor on the documentary programme of RTS, which is the largest radio and television network in Serbia and Montenegro. Her TV programs are broadcast via satellite. She has been running her own TV production company since 2004.

== Titleholders ==
Year	Miss Serbia	Municipality
2006	Vedrana Grbović	Belgrade
2007	Mirjana Božović	Belgrade
2008	Nevena Lipovac	Belgrade
2009	Jelena Marković	Užice
2010	Milica Jelić	Belgrade
2011	Milica Tepavac	Sombor
2012	Nikolina Bojić; Dethroned	Kula
2013	Milica Vukliš	Belgrade
2014	Marija Ćetković	Novi Sad
2015	Katarina Šulkić	Zvečan
2016	Anđelija Rogić	Užice
2017	Ivana Trišić	Belgrade
2018	Sanja Lovčević	Belgrade
2019	Andrijana Savić	Gornji Milanovac
2021	Anja Radić	Belgrade

== Big Four pageants representatives ==
The following women have represented Serbia in the Big Four international beauty pageants, the four major international beauty pageants for women. These are Miss World, Miss Universe, Miss International and Miss Earth.

=== Miss Universe Serbia ===
Miss Serbia has started to send a Miss Universe Serbia to Miss Universe from 2007. On occasion, when the winner does not qualify (due to age) for either contest, a runner-up is sent. Since Serbia and Montenegro split to two countries, Serbia has achieved one placement (as of 2024) since their debut in 2007. Began 2024 the Miss Universe Serbia winner was selected by Miss Universe Serbia Organization.

=== Miss World Serbia ===
- : Declared as Winner
- : Ended as runner-up or top 5/6 qualification
- : Ended as one of the finalists or semifinalists
- : Ended as special awards winner

Year	Municipality	Miss Serbia	Placement at Miss World	Special Awards	Notes
2026	Novi Sad	Simona Manojlović	Unplaced		
2025	Belgrade	Aleksandra Rutović	Top 40	Miss World Talent (Top 48)	
2024	No competition held				
2023	Belgrade	Anja Radić	Unplaced		
2022	Miss World 2021 was rescheduled to 16 March 2022 due to the COVID-19 pandemic outbreak in Puerto Rico, no edition started in 2022				
2021	Gornji Milanovac	Andrijana Savić	Unplaced	Miss World Sport (Top 32)	
2020	Due to the impact of COVID-19 pandemic, no pageant in 2020				
2019	Belgrade	Sanja Lovčević	Did not compete		
2018	Belgrade	Ivana Trišić	Unplaced	Miss World Top Model (Top 30)	
2017	Užice	Anđelija Rogić	Unplaced		
2016	Zvečan	Katarina Šulkić	Unplaced	Miss World Talent (Top 21)	
2015	Novi Sad	Marija Ćetković	Unplaced	Miss World Sport (Top 24)	
2014	Belgrade	Milica Vukliš	Unplaced	Miss World Sport (3rd Runner-up)	
2013	Pančevo	Aleksandra Doknić	Unplaced		
2012	Nova Varoš	Bojana Lečić	Unplaced		
2011	Sombor	Milica Tepavac	Top 31	Miss World Beach Beauty (Top 5)	
2010	Belgrade	Milica Jelić	Unplaced		
2009	Užice	Jelena Marković	Unplaced	Miss World Talent (Top 22)	
2008	Belgrade	Nevena Lipovac	Unplaced	Miss World Beach Beauty (Top 25)	
2007	Belgrade	Mirjana Božović	Unplaced		
2006	Belgrade	Vedrana Grbović	Unplaced		

=== Miss International Serbia ===
- : Declared as Winner
- : Ended as runner-up or top 5/6 qualification
- : Ended as one of the finalists or semifinalists
- : Ended as special awards winner

Year	Municipality	Miss International Serbia	Placement at Miss International	Special Awards	Notes
2024	Did not compete				
2023	Niš	Victorija Stojiljkovic	Unplaced		
Did not compete between 2015—2022
2014	Belgrade	Lidija Kocić	Unplaced		
Did not compete between 2011—2013
2010	Raška	Anja Šaranović	Top 15		
2009	Did not compete				
2008	Belgrade	Sanja Radinović	Unplaced		
2007	South Bačka	Teodora Marčić	Unplaced		
2006	Belgrade	Danka Dizdarević	Unplaced		

=== Miss Earth Serbia ===
- : Declared as Winner
- : Ended as runner-up or top 5/6 qualification
- : Ended as one of the finalists or semifinalists
- : Ended as special awards winner

Year	Municipality	Miss Earth Serbia	Placement at Miss Earth	Special Awards	Notes
2025	Belgrade	Nina Karapešev	Unplaced		
2024	Niš	Viktorija Stojiljković	Unplaced		
2024	Stara Pazova	Anja Čubrić	Did not compete		
2023	Belgrade	Andjela Vanevski	Unplaced		
2022	Belgrade	Milica Krstovic	Unplaced		
2021	Ruma	Djina Radovac	Unplaced		
2020	Belgrade	Sandra Milenković	Unplaced		
2020	Niš	Jana Radulovic	Did not compete		
2019	Novi Sad	Ljubica Rajković	Unplaced	(silver) Miss Friendship (Water)	
2018	Belgrade	Nina Jovanovic	Unplaced (Top 10 Beauty of Face and Poise)	(gold) Best National Costume (Eastern Europe)	
2017	Mitrovica	Marija Nikić	Unplaced (Top 16 Beauty of Face and Poise)		
2016	Belgrade	Teodora Janković	Unplaced		
Did not compete between 2014—2015
2013	Kosovska Mitrovica	Anđelka Tomašević	Top 8		
Did not compete between 2011—2012
2010	Belgrade	Tijana Rakić	Unplaced	Best in Aodai	
2009	Belgrade	Dijana Milojković	Unplaced		
2008	Belgrade	Bojana Traljić	Unplaced		
2007	Belgrade	Slađana Damjanac	Unplaced		
2006	Belgrade	Dubravka Škorić	Unplaced		

== See also ==
- Miss Yugoslavia
- Miss Serbia by year
