= Miss Yugoslavia =

Defunct Yugoslav beauty pageant

- Formation: 1927
- Dissolved: 1991
- Type: Beauty Pageant
- Headquarters: Belgrade
- Location: Yugoslavia

Miss Yugoslavia was the national beauty pageant of Yugoslavia, held since 1927 in Kingdom of Yugoslavia up to the breakup of Yugoslavia.

It was organized by the company "Miss YU". The same company restarted it Miss Yugoslavia (Serbia and Montenegro) in 1996.

== History ==
Miss Yugoslavia held for the first time in 1927. The main winner represented the country at Miss Europe beauty pageant. The Miss YU also registered to send title holders to Miss Universe, Miss World, Miss International and Miss Earth pageants.

== Titleholders ==
=== Miss Yugoslavia ===
| Year | Miss Yugoslavia |
Kingdom of Yugoslavia
| 1927 | Štefica Vidačić |
| 1928 | Sonja Hernej |
| 1929 | Stanislava Matijević |
| 1930 | Štefka Ceca Stephanie Drobnjak |
| 1931 | Katarina Katica Urban |
| 1932 | Olga Đurić (Gjurić) |
| 1933 | Dragica Ugarković |
| 1938 | Olga Dinjaški |
Socialist Federal Republic of Yugoslavia
| 1959 | Romana Milutin |
| 1966 | Nikica Marinović |
| 1967 | Aleksandra Mandić |
| 1968 | Ivona Puhiera |
| 1969 | Radmila Živković |
| 1970 | Tereza Đelmiš |
| 1971 | Zlata Petković |
| 1972 | Biljana Ristić |
| 1973 | Atina Golubova |
| 1974 | Jadranka Banjac |
| 1975 | Lidija Velkovska |
| 1976 | Slavica Stefanović |
| 1977 | Svetlana Višnjić |
| 1978 | Ljiljana Đogović |
| 1979 | ? |
| 1980 | Zorica Pesek |
| 1981 | not held |
| 1982 | Ana Sasso |
| 1983 | Bernarda Marovt |
| 1984 | Dinka Delić |
| 1985 | Aleksandra Kosanović |
| 1986 | Maja Kučić |
| 1987 | Matilda Sazdova |
| 1988 | Suzana Žunić |
| 1989 | Aleksandra Dobraš |
| 1990 | Ivona Brnelić |
| 1991 | Slavica Tripunović |

== Major International competitions ==
Color key

- Declared as Winner
- Ended as runner-up
- Ended as one of the finalists or semifinalists

=== Miss Universe ===
The 1st Runner-Up of Miss Yugoslavia (later Miss Serbia and Montenegro) would compete at Miss Universe. If the 1st Runner-Up could not compete, the 2nd Runner-Up or a finalist would take their place if able to.

| Year | Miss Universe Yugoslavia | Placement |
MISS UNIVERSE YUGOSLAVIA
| 1968 | Daliborka Stojšić | Top 15, Miss Photogenic & Best Swimsuit |
| 1969 | Nataša Košir | Top 15 & Best Swimsuit |
| 1970 | Snežana Džambas | Unplaced |
| 1974 | Nada Jovanovsky | Unplaced |
| 1975 | Lidija Vera Manić | Unplaced |
| 1976 | Svetlana Radojčić | Unplaced |
| 1977 | Ljiljana Šobajić | Unplaced |
| 1984 | Ksenija Borojević | Unplaced |
| 1985 | Dinka Delić | Unplaced |
| 1991 | Nataša Pavlović aka Natasha Pavlovich | Top 10 |

=== Miss World ===
The main winner of Miss Yugoslavia (later Miss Serbia and Montenegro) would primarily compete at Miss World. If the winner could not compete, the 1st Runner-Up would take their place if able to.

| Year | Miss World Yugoslavia | Placement |
MISS WORLD YUGOSLAVIA
| 1966 | Nikica Marinović | 1st Runner-Up |
| 1967 | Aleksandra Mandić | Unplaced |
| 1968 | Ivona Puhiera | Top 15 |
| 1969 | Radmila Živković | Unplaced |
| 1970 | Tereza Đjelmiš | Top 15 |
| 1971 | Zlata Petković | Unplaced |
| 1972 | Biljana Ristić | Top 15 |
| 1973 | Atina Golubova | Unplaced |
| 1974 | Jadranka Banjac | Unplaced |
| 1975 | Lidija Velkovska | 4th Runner-Up |
| 1976 | Slavica Stefanović | Unplaced |
| 1977 | Svetlana Višnjić | Unplaced |
| 1978 | Ljiljana Đogović | Unplaced |
| 1982 | Ana Sasso | Top 15 |
| 1983 | Bernarda Marovt | Top 15 |
| 1984 | Dinka Delić | Unplaced |
| 1985 | Aleksandra Kosanović | Unplaced |
| 1986 | Maja Kučić | Top 15 |
| 1987 | Matilda Sazdova | Unplaced |
| 1988 | Suzana Žunić | Unplaced |
| 1989 | Aleksandra Dobraš | Unplaced |
| 1990 | Ivona Brnelić | Unplaced |
| 1991 | Slavica Tripunović | Unplaced |

=== Miss International ===
Like Miss Universe, a Runner-Up of Miss Yugoslavia (later Miss Serbia and Montenegro) would compete at Miss International. If the original delegate could not compete, another Runner-Up or a finalist would take their place if able to.

| Year | Miss International Yugoslavia/Serbia and Montenegro | Placement |
MISS INTERNATIONAL YUGOSLAVIA
| 1967 | Slavenka Veselinovic | Top 15 |
| 1968 | Tatjana Albahari | Unplaced |
| 1970 | Zdenka Marn | Top 15 |
| 1971 | Dunja Ercegović | Top 15 |
| 1975 | Lidija Vera Manić | Miss International 1975 |
| 1976 | ? | Unplaced |
| 1977 | Svetlana Višnjić | Unplaced |
| 1979 | Manuela Mitic | Unplaced |
| 1988 | Alma Hasanbasic | Unplaced |
