= Miss Grand Peru =

Peru beauty pageant title

- Formation: 2014
- Headquarters: Lima
- Location: Peru
- Official language: Spanish
- National director: Jessica Newton
- Parent organization: Grupo D'Elite, (2016 – 2024)
- Affiliations: Miss Grand International

Miss Grand Peru
licensees timeline

Stand-alone pageant
Title under Miss Peru
Appointed titleholder
No licensee/titleholder

Miss Grand Peru is a national beauty pageant that selects contestants to represent Peru at Miss Grand International. In 2014, Sophía Venero, a finalist of Miss World Peru 2014, was appointed to represent Peru at Miss Grand International 2014 in Thailand. Until 2015, the pageant licensee was Hanssel Vega, and from 2016, Grupo D'Elite headed by Jessica Newton, .

Since 2014, Peru has won twice; in 2017 and 2023 by María José Lora and Luciana Fuster, respectively. Peru has also won the Best National Costume awards in 2018, 2021 and 2022.

== History ==
In the first decades, the Peruvian representatives for Miss Grand International were either hand-picked or determined by another national pageant, Miss Perú, managed by Grupo D'Elite. Later in 2023, the event was planned to be held individually for the first time. Lima was the host city, and 12 national finalists were expected to participate.

In 2020, the representative for Miss Grand International 2020, Miss Perú 2019 Samantha Batallanos, was removed by the national licensee sit was claimed she was not well prepared, and a professional model named Maricielo Gamarra was then appointed as the replacement. Batallanos was later appointed to Miss Grand International 2021.

== Editions ==
The Miss Grand Peru pageant has been a stand-alone pageant since 2023.

=== Date and venue ===
Edition	Date	Final Venue	Host department	Entrants	Ref.
1st	June 22, 2023	América Televisión Studio, Lima	Lima	11	
2nd	September 21, 2024	La Plaza Central de Punchana, Punchana	Loreto	18	
3rd	31 August 2025	Teatro Segura, Lima	Lima	17	
4th	2026	Lima			

=== Competition result ===
Year	Edition	Winner	1st runner-up	2nd runner-up	3rd runner-up	4th runner-up	Ref.
2023	1st	Luciana Fuster (Callao)	Pia Requejo (Ancash)	Zuliet Seminario (Arequipa)	Brenda Serpa (Huánuco)	Michelle Choque (Lambayeque)	
2024	2nd	Arlette Rujel (Callao)	Niva Antezana (Lima)	Alexandra Parcón (Lima Centro)	Andrea Torres (Loreto)	Not awarded	
2025	3rd	Flavia López (Lima Centro)	Zuliet Seminario (Arequipa)	Mariana Zabarain (Peru USA)	Malú Zegarra (Moquegua)	Claudia Meza (La Libertad)	

== International contest ==
List of Peruvian representatives at the Miss Grand International pageant
Year	Delegate	National title	Competition performance		National Director	Ref.
Year	Delegate	National title	Placements	Other awards	National Director	Ref.
2014	Sophia Venero	Miss Grand Peru 2014	Top 20	—	Hanssel Vega	
2015	Alejandra Almonte	Miss Grand Peru 2015	Unplaced	—	Hanssel Vega	
2016	Prissila Howard	1st runner-up Miss Peru 2016	Top 10	—	Jessica Newton	
2017	María José Lora	Miss Grand Peru 2017	Winner	—	Jessica Newton	
2018	Andrea Moberg	1st runner-up Miss Peru 2018	Top 20	Best National Costume	Jessica Newton	
2019	Camila Escribens	1st runner-up Miss Peru 2019	Top 10	Best Evening Gown	Jessica Newton	
2020	Maricielo Gamarra	1st runner-up Miss Peru 2020	Top 20	—	Jessica Newton	
2021	Samantha Batallanos	2nd runner-up Miss Peru 2019	Unplaced	Best National Costume	Jessica Newton	
2022	Janet Leyva	Miss Grand Peru 2022	Top 20	Best National Costume	Jessica Newton	
2023	Luciana Fuster	Miss Grand Peru 2023	Winner	—	Jessica Newton	
2024	Arlette Rujel	Miss Grand Peru 2024	5th Runners-Up	—	Jessica Newton	
2025	Flavia López	Miss Grand Peru 2025	Unplaced	—	Jessica Newton	
2026	Zuliet Seminario	1st runner-up Miss Grand Peru 2025	Top 25		Jessica Newton	

== Winner gallery ==
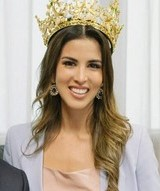
2017 and Miss Grand International 2017 María José Lora

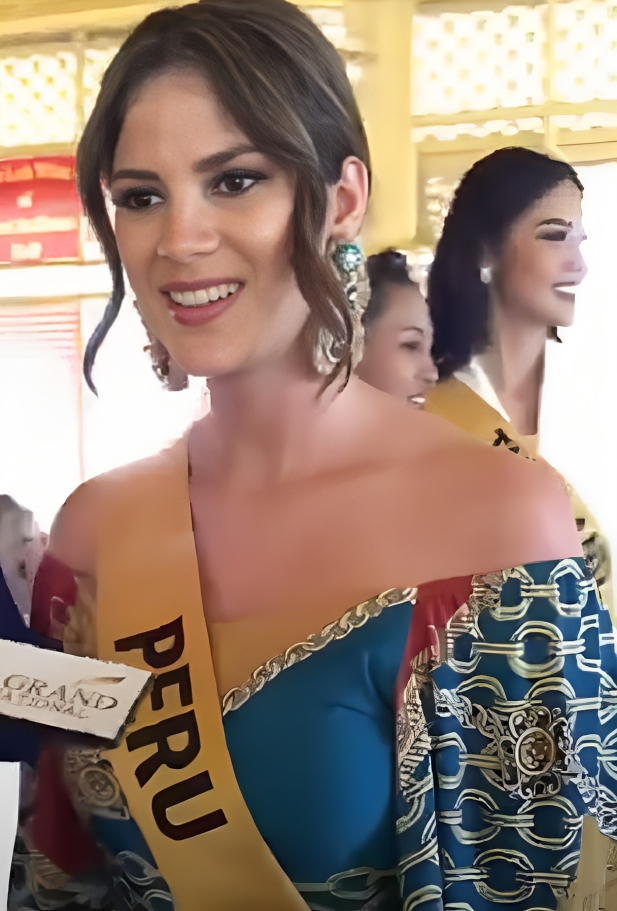
2018 Andrea Moberg

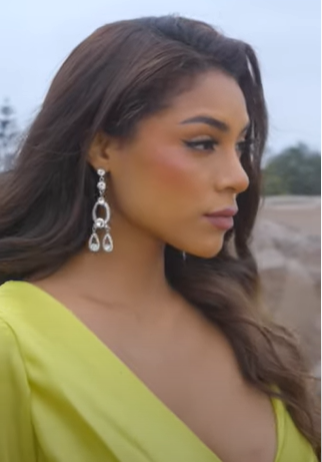
2022 Janet Leyva

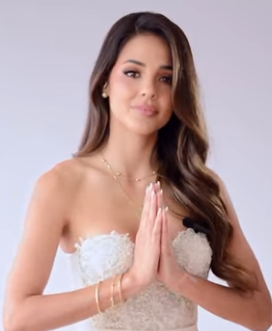
2023 and Miss Grand International 2023 Luciana Fuster

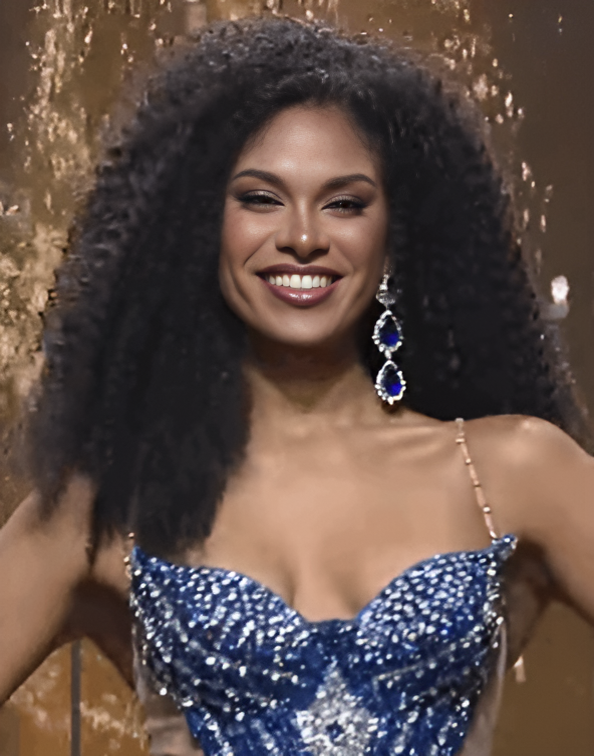
2024 Arlette Rujel

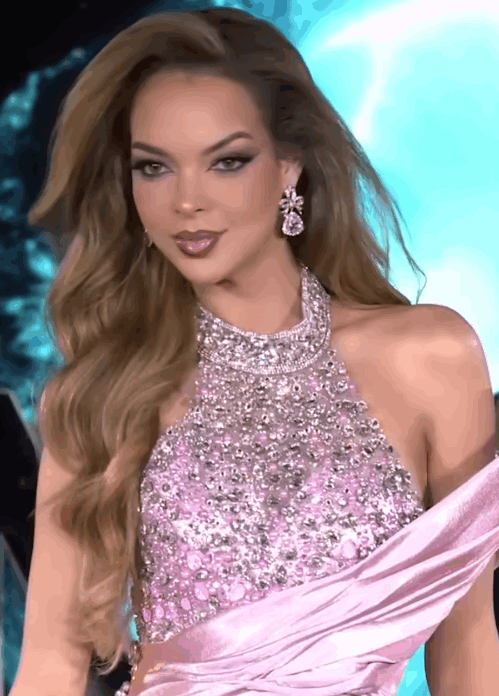
2025 Flavia López
