= Miss Grand Peru 2025 =

3rd Miss Grand Peru contest

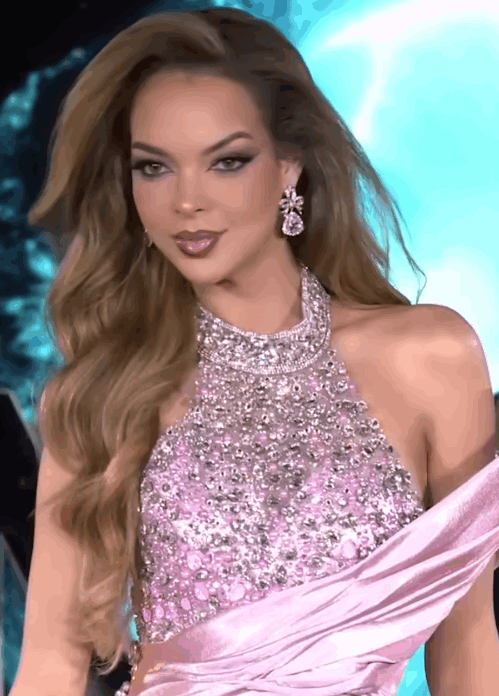
- Flavia López, the winner of the contest
- Date: 31 August 2025
- Presenters: Luciana Fuster
- Venue: Teatro Segura, Lima
- Broadcaster: YouTube
- Entrants: 17
- Placements: 8
- Debuts: Amazonas; Chiclayo; Lima Oeste; Moquegua; Peruvian Communities in USA
- Withdrawals: Ancash; Comas; Jaén; Loreto; Rímac; Santa Anita
- Winner: Flavia López (Lima Centro)
- Photogenic: Claudia Montoya Seggi (La Libertad)

Miss Grand Peru 2025 was the 3rd Miss Grand Peru pageant, held on 31 August 2025, at the Teatro Segura in Lima. Seventeen contestants from different departments and cities of Peru competed for the title.

Alessia Rovegno of Lima Centro was named the winner and was crowned by the outgoing Miss Grand Peru 2024 Tatiana Calmell del Solar of Callao. Alessia will represent the country internationally at the Miss Grand International 2025 pageant, to be held in Bangkok, Thailand, on 18 October 2025.

== Selection of contestants ==
Only the Ica and Lima departments conducted their regional contests for this year's edition; the other candidates were directly selected by the regional or central organizer to represent their respective departments.

The regional preliminary contests for Miss Grand Peru 2025 are as follows.

Pageant	Edition	Date	Venue	Entrants	Coordinator	Ref.
Miss Grand Ica	1st	13 July 2025	Hacienda Hotel Macacona, Subtanjalla	7	Pierre Blondet Luis Jean	
Miss Grand Lima Región	1st	20 July 2025	Centro de Convenciones Festiva, Lima	8	Joseph Lynch	

== Results ==
=== Main placements ===
Miss Grand Peru 2025 competition result by department
Color key:
Winner	1st Runner-up
2nd Runner-up	3rd Runner-up
Top 8	Unplaced
Withdrew	No representative

Placement	Contestant
Miss Grand Peru 2025	Lima Centro - Alessia Rovegno
1st Runner-up	Arequipa - Arlette Rujel
2nd Runner-up	Peru USA - Flavia López
3rd Runner-up	Moquegua - Giovanna Figallo Hara
4th Runner-up	La Libertad - Karina Sasaki
Top 8	Tumbes - Alexandra Colton; Lambayeque - Sara Paredes Valdivia; Lima Oeste - Isabel Gatjens

=== Special awards ===
Award	Contestant
Grand Silueta	Lima Centro – Alessia Rovegno
Grand Beauty Face	Arequipa – Arlette Rujel
Grand Fotogénica	La Libertad – Karina Sasaki
Grand Elegancia	Peruvian Com. in USA – Flavia López
Grand Sonrisa	Lima Centro – Alessia Rovegno
Mejor Piel	Amazonas – Ivette Borrero Quezada
Grand Pasarela	Tumbes – Alexandra Colton
Reto Crowned by Vizzano	Lima Centro – Alessia Rovegno

== Contestants ==
The following contestants have been confirmed.

- Amazonas – Ivette Borrero Quezada
- Arequipa – Arlette Rujel
- Callao – Claudia Montoya Seggi
- Chiclayo – Gabriela Rocha
- Cusco – Karen Vílchez (withdrew)
- Ica – Paloma Farfán
- Pimentel – Rosella Armas Vargas
- Lambayeque – Sara Paredes Valdivia
- La Libertad – Karina Sasaki
- Junín – Winona Marín Pérez
- Lima Centro – Alessia Rovegno
- Lima Norte – Fiorella Castellano Reynosa
- Lima Oeste – Isabel Gatjens
- Lima Región – Zulema Álvarez Guzman
- Moquegua – Giovanna Figallo Hara
- Peruvian Com. in USA – Flavia López (Note: As the replacement for Alexandra Colton, who resigned from the title on 15 July 2025.)
- Tacna – Lissette Candela
- Tumbes – Alexandra Colton
