= Miss Perú 2019 =

- Date: October 20th, 2019
- Presenters: Fernando Carrillo; Andrea Moberg; Alonso Martinez
- Venue: Maracaná Event Center, Lima, Peru
- Broadcaster: Latina Televisión
- Entrants: 10
- Placements: 6
- Winner: Kelin Rivera; Arequipa

Following the dethronements (please read below for further info) of Anyella Grados and Tiffany Yoko Chong; the president of the Miss Peru Organization, Jessica Newton decided to organize a special edition of the Miss Peru 2019 pageant. The new format consisted of ten former contestants that had previous pageant experience whether at international or national level to compete for the national crown and to represent the country in other selected pageants.

This edition was held on the night of October 20, 2019, at the Maracaná Event Center in Jesús María, Lima, Peru after weeks of events. The theme of the contest consisted of a platform opposing violence against women, which is an ongoing social threat that keeps harming the Peruvian society, as well as the rest of Latin America.

Due to commitments with a different broadcaster, outgoing titleholder Romina Lozano was not there to crown her successor.

As head of the organization and on behalf of the judges panel that included her, Newton crowned Kelin Rivera of Arequipa as the new Miss Peru at the end of the event.

== Placements ==
Final results	Contestant
Miss Peru 2019 Miss Peru Universe	Arequipa - Kelin Rivera
Miss Supranational Peru 2019 1st Runner-Up	(United States) USA Perú – Janick Maceta
Miss Grand Peru 2021 2nd Runner-Up	Region Lima - Samantha Batallanos
Miss Eco Peru 2020 3rd Runner-Up	Distrito Capital - Lesly Reyna
Miss Top Model of the World Peru 2019 4th Runner-Up	Ucayali - Diana Rengifo
Miss Peru Hispanoamericana 2019 5th Runner-Up	Piura - Pierina Melendez

== Special awards ==
- Miss Empowerment - Pasco - Jessamin Chaparro
- Miss Teoma - Region Lima - Lesly Reyna

== Delegates ==
- Amazonas - Pamela Sanchez
- Arequipa - Kelin Rivera
- Distrito Capital - Lesly Reyna
- La Libertad - Melody Calderon
- Pasco - Jessamin Chaparro
- Piura - Pierina Melendez
- Region Lima - Samantha Batallanos
- San Juan de Miraflores - Pilar Orúe
- Ucayali - Diana Rengifo
- USA Peru - Janick Maceta

== Judges ==
- Jessica Newton - President of the Miss Peru Organization
- Karen Schwarz – Miss Peru 2009
- Mónica Chacón D’Vettori - Miss World Peru 1996
- Alexander Gonzalez - Beauty Pageant Coach
- Adriana Zubiate – Miss Perú 2002
- Ángela Ponce - Miss Spain 2018
- Laura Spoya – Miss Peru 2015
- Fabian Navt - Preliminary Judge
- Viviana Rivasplata - Miss Perú 2001
- Maria Jose Lora - Miss Grand International 2017

== Music & Special Guests Singers ==
- Opening Show – "El Cóndor Pasa" (Instrumental)
- Interviews – Fort Minor (feat. Styles of Beyond) - Remember the Name
- Swimsuit Competition – Banda de la Guardia Republicana - "La Concheperla"
- Activities – Marian Hill - "Down"
- Evening Gown Competition – Manuel José - "Gavilán o Paloma" & "Lo Pasado, Pasado"

== Miss World Peru 2019 ==
The Miss World Peru 2019 pageant was held on August 18, 2019, following weeks of preparation.

The outgoing titleholder, Clarisse Uribe of Ica crowned her successor, Angella Escudero of Piura at the end of the event.

== MWP 2019 Placements ==
Final results	Contestant
Miss World Peru 2019	Piura - Angella Escudero
Miss United Continents Peru 2019	Ucayali - Marjorie Patiño
Miss Earth Peru 2019	Cajamarca - Alexandra Cáceres
1st runner-up	La Libertad - Leticia Hurtado
Top 8	Region Lima - Rafaela Oliveira; Lambayeque - Susan Razuri; Arequipa - Lisdey Paredes; Distrito Capital - Neydi Pereyra

== MWP 2019 special awards ==
- Miss Congeniality - Mollendo - Camila Camino
- Miss Elegance - La Libertad - Leticia Hurtado
- Most Beautiful Face - Piura - Angella Escudero
- Miss Body- Arequipa - Lisdey Paredes

== MWP 2019 delegates ==
- Arequipa - Lisdey Paredes
- Cajamarca - Alexandra Cáceres
- Callao - Gabriela Chavez
- Chincha - Sheilly Herencia
- Distrito Capital - Neydi Pereyra
- Huánuco - Brenda Ratto
- Ica - Nadia Herrera
- La Libertad - Leticia Hurtado
- Lambayeque - Susan Razuri
- Loreto - Monica Moncada
- Mollendo - Camila Camino
- Piura - Angella Escudero
- Region Lima - Rafaela Oliveira
- Ucayali - Marjorie Patiño

== MWP 2019 background music ==
- Opening Show – Christina Aguilera - Candyman
- Swimsuit Competition – Lou Bega - Mambo No. 5
- Evening Gown Competition – Piano Medley - (Por El Amor De Una Mujer & Toda una Vida)

== Initial MP 2019 Pageant | Controversies, Scandal and Dethronements ==
What was supposed to be the original Miss Peru 2019 pageant was held on the night of October 21, 2018. This contest was held in the historic centre's Municipal Theatre in Lima, Peru after weeks of events.

The outgoing titleholder, Romina Lozano of Callao crowned Anyella Grados of La Libertad at the end of the event.

The pageant was broadcast by Latina Television and again hosted by presenter Cristian Rivero with the outside commenting of Miss Peru 2009, Karen Schwarz.

This election became a platform searching breast cancer prevention for women in Peru: when the 50 candidates took the floor to specify their measurements, each one announced an statistics and advice at the same time they exposure their shave heads in manner to respect of patients suffering of the illness.

The final results of this first pageant were heavily criticized by Peruvians, media, and pageant fans as this edition of the event featured to be very questionable. Grados was never categorized as a favorite to win the title and she did not excel throughout the crowning night in any of the cuts (Swimsuit, Evening Gown, and Final Answer) where she was overshadowed by many other contestants. In fact, she delivered an erroneous answer about the country's current political situation in the topic of corruption. Escribens, the 1st Runner-Up, has been also in the eye of the storm as she does not speak Spanish fluently and still has obvious trouble with the country's national language, which questioned her progress during the final answers portion. It was unknown whether other finalists will want to represent Peru at the international level with the many discrepancies seen within the organization.

Months following this debacle, in March 2019, Grados and 2nd Runner-Up, Tiffany Yoko Chong were dethroned and stripped of their titles due to inappropriate behavior following a trip sponsored by the organization. These events were heavily criticized by the media and Peruvian citizens, among international community among pageantry experts and fans in regards to unacceptable incidents involving two representatives of the country. Despite 1st Runner-Up Escribens' attendance to this trip as well, she was not involved in the incidents and was forgiven to keep her title of Miss Grand Peru but not to inherit the national crown as rules stipulated. A new contest was to be announced to erase the happenings that tarnished these first event which already had not popular results.

== Initial MP placements ==
Final results	Contestant
Miss Grand Peru 2019 1st Runner-Up of Event	USA Perú – Camila Escribens
Miss Top Model Of Peru 2018	Callao – Janet Leyva
Miss Eco Peru 2019	Distrito Capital – Suheyn Cipriani
Miss Atlantico International Peru 2019	Region Lima – Estefanía Olcese
Top 6	Spain Peru – Maria Grazia Crosato; Loreto – Lucía Arellano
Top 8	Piura – Valentina Ragone; Chorrillos – Kristel Aranda
Top 15	Huánuco – Valeria Mori; La Molina – Vanessa Matthey; Czech Republic Peru – Fiorella Mosquera; Arequipa – Melissa Maggi; Puno – Alejandra Bachhani
DETHRONED	La Libertad – Anyella Grados (Dethroned Winner | Loses title of Miss Peru Universe 2019 ); Ucayali – Tiffany Yoko Chong (Dethroned 2nd Runner-Up | Loses title of Miss Peru Supranational 2019)

== Initial MP 2019 delegates ==
- Amazonas - Raysa Cucho Vilchez
- Áncash - Gabriela Novoa
- Apurímac - Maggie Gonzalez Zuniga
- Arequipa - Melissa Maggi
- Ayacucho - Alexandra Martinez
- Barranco - Greta Boada
- Cajamarca - Alejandra Leon
- Callao - Janet Leyva
- Chepén - Lisbeth Delgado
- Chimbote - Luciana Sanchez
- Chorrillos - Kristel Aranda
- Cieneguilla - Tiffany Talledo
- Cuzco - Kady Lobatón
- Czech Republic Peru - Fiorella Mosquera
- Distrito Capital - Suheyn Cipriani
- Huanchaco - Wendy Gutierrez
- Huánuco - Valeria Mori
- Huaraz - Grace Centeno
- Huarochirí - Anais Morales
- Italia Peru - Milena Santecchi
- Jesús María - Wendy Moran Galindo
- Juliaca - Connie Atoche
- Junín - Julissa Serina
- Korea Peru - Danvy Park
- La Libertad - Anyella Grados Meza
- La Molina - Vanesa Mathey
- Loreto - Lucía Arellano
- Miraflores - Micaela Leon Mandriotti
- Mollendo - Michelle Venero
- Pacasmayo - Melany Manchego
- Pasco - Stana Boucher
- Piura - Valentina Ragone Davies
- Pucallpa - Dacia Del Aguila
- Pucusana - Kamila Callegari
- Puno - Alejandra Bachhani Huamani
- Region Lima - Estefanía Olcese
- San Isidro - Valeria Cassana
- San Martín - Kinverly Tenazoa
- San Miguel - Antuaneth Becerra
- Spain Peru - Maria Grazia Crosato Neumann
- Sullana - Raisa Balcazar
- Surco - Fabiola Adrianzen
- Tacna - Gabriela Salas
- Talara - Diana Silva
- Tarapoto - Estefany Paredes
- Trujillo - Claudia Meza
- Tumbes - Angie Chore
- Ucayali - Tiffany Yoko Chong
- Urubamba - Munay Bess Prado
- USA Perú - Camila Escribens

== Initial MP 2019 music & special guest singers ==
- Opening – Jonathan Moly - "Te Besare"
- Parade of Regions – Alexandra Burke - "Hallelujah"
- Swimsuit Competition – Tony Succar & Jean Rodriguez - "Michael Jackson Medley" (Uptown Funk/ Billie Jean/ Black Or White)
- Evening Gown Competition – Chyno Miranda - "El Peor"
