= Miss Peru 2016 =

- Date: April 23rd, 2016
- Presenters: María Julia Mantilla & Mathías Brivio
- Entertainment: Lil Silvio & El Vega (Top 15 Swimsuit Competition); Micheille Soifer & Idéntico (Top 10 Evening Gown Competition)
- Venue: Ecological Center and Studios of America Television Production, Pachacamac, Lima, Peru
- Broadcaster: America Television
- Entrants: 31 (30 + 1 contestant saved by the judges during the cut prior to the preliminary competition).
- Placements: 15
- Winner: Valeria Piazza; Distrito Capital

The Miss Peru 2016 pageant was held on the night of April 23rd, 2016. This national beauty contest inaugurated the brand new Ecological Center Studios of America Television in Pachacamac, Lima, Peru, after weeks of events.

The outgoing titleholder, Laura Spoya of Lima crowned her successor, Valeria Piazza of Lima at the end of the event.

The crowning featured the assistance of special guest Miss Universe 2015, Pia Wurtzbach of the Philippines who also judged during the final telecast.

Piazza represented Peru at Miss Universe 2016 where she successfully placed in the final. The first and second runners-up were also crowned, as Prissila Howard and Danea Panta represented Peru at the Miss Grand International 2016 and Miss International 2016 pageants, respectively.

The pageant was broadcast by America Television for the first time since 2002. The event was hosted by Miss World 2004, María Julia Mantilla and presenter Mathías Brivio.

== Results ==
=== Placements ===
Placement	Contestant
Miss Peru 2016	Distrito Capital – Valeria Piazza
1st Runner-Up	Piura – Prissila Howard
2nd Runner-Up	La Esperanza – Danea Panta
3rd Runner-Up	La Libertad – Estefani Mauricci
4th Runner-Up	Region Lima – Ivana Yturbe
Top 11^	USA Perú – Janick Maceta; Cuzco – Antonella de Groo; Trujillo – Ana Estefanía Vásquez; San Isidro – Giuliana Barrios; Callao – Giuliana Montalbetti; Ancash – Suemi Jhong
Top 15	Amazonas – Hanny Portocarrero; Sullana – Leonela López; Ucayali – Marjorie Patiño; Chincha – Lucero Francis Fernández

- The (*) means that during the live telecast, there was a cut from the Top 10 to a Top 5, which followed a first final question round. Later, another cut to decide a Top 3 was decided to decide the contestants advancing to the second final question round to decide the winner. Two contestants were eliminated at that stage, and their exact placements were not specified until days later by Jessica Newton (President of the Miss Peru Organization) in an open press news release.
- The (^) means that there was supposed to be a Top 10, following the cut from the Top 15 swimsuit competition. However, it was announced by the hosts at the live telecast during the Top 10 announcement that there was a tie for 10th place, thus making it a Top 11 at the end.

== Special awards ==
- Best Regional Costume - San Martín - Valkiria Aragón
- Miss Photogenic - Region Lima - Ivana Yturbe
- Miss Elegance - La Esperanza - Danea Panta
- Miss Body - Amazonas - Hanny Portocarrero
- Best Hair - Cuzco - Antonella de Groot
- Miss Congeniality - Moquegua - Rossi Vargas
- Most Beautiful Face - Region Lima - Ivana Yturbe
- Best Smile - Distrito Capital - Valeria Piazza
- Miss Rosa - Chimbote - Mirella Paz Baylón

.

== Delegates ==
- Amazonas - Hanny Portocarrero
- Áncash - Suemi Jhong
- Apurímac - Flor Vergara Baca
- Arequipa - Ximena Tamayo Butilier
- Ayabaca - Sophia Cossio
- Callao - Giuliana Montalbetti
- Chimbote - Mirella Paz Baylón
- Chincha - Lucero Francis
- Cuzco - Antonella De Groot Velasco
- Distrito Capital - Valeria Piazza
- Europe Perú - Kim Zollner
- Huaraz - Stefania Viviani
- Ica - Solymar Camasca
- La Esperanza - Danea Panta
- La Libertad - Estefani Mauricci Gil
- Lambayeque - Saymel Vega
- Moquegua - Rossi Vargas
- Pachacamac - Kiara Barrantes
- Piura - Prissila Howard
- Pucallpa - Sharon Neyra
- Region Lima - Ivana Yturbe
- San Isidro - Giulliana Barrios
- San Martín - Valkiria Aragón
- Sullana - Leonela López
- Surco - Giomara Suárez Echegeray
- Talara - Karla Flores
- Trujillo - Ana Estefanía Vasquez Paiva
- Tumbes - Eva Reyes
- Ucayali - Marjorie Patiño
- USA Peru - Janick Maceta
- Villa El Salvador - Alexia Villagomez

== Judges ==
- Miss Universe 2015, Pia Wurtzbach from the Philippines.
- Miss Universe 1995, Chelsi Smith from the USA.
- Miss Peru 1978, Olga Zumarán.
- Miss Peru 1990, Marisol Martínez.
- Miss Peru 2001, Viviana Rivasplata.
- Miss Peru 2002, Adriana Zubiate.
- Miss Peru 2003, Claudia Ortiz de Zevallos.
- Miss World Peru 1996, Mónica Chacón.
- Miss World Peru, 2002, Marina Mora.
- Luis Miguel Ciccia, Turismo CIVA proprietor and president of the judge panel.
- Ruth Enciso, photographer and magazine editor.
- Patricia Uehara, photographer.
- Rebecca Escribens, TV hostess and presenter.
- Norka Peralta, official gown designer of the pageant.
- Isabel Serkovic, designer.
- Percy Luzio, TV image director.

== Performers ==
- Top 15 Swimsuit Competition: Lil Silvio & El Vega.
- Top 10 Evening Gown Competition: Micheille Soifer & Identico.

== Contestant Notes ==
- The winner, Valeria Piazza, placed in the Top 13 at Miss Universe 2016, held on January 30, 2017, at the Mall of Asia Arena in Pasay, Metro Manila, Philippines. This was Peru's 18th placement in Miss Universe history.
- The 1st runner-up, Prissila Howard, placed in the Top 10 at Miss Grand International 2016, held on October 25, 2016, at the Westgate Las Vegas Resort & Casino in Las Vegas, NV, USA. This was Peru's 2nd placement in Miss Grand International history. Later she was appointed as Miss Universe Perú 2017 and competed in Miss Universe 2017.
- The 2nd runner-up, Danea Panta, unplaced at Miss International 2016, held on October 27, 2016, at the Tokyo Dome City Hall in Tokyo, Japan. Panta had also previously won Peru's Next Top Model in 2013.
- Top 11 Finalist Janick Maceta competed in Miss Perú 2019 where she placed 1st runner up and competed in Miss Supranational 2019 where she placed as 3rd runner up. A year after she competed again for the title of Miss Perú 2020 where she was crowned as the winner and represented Peru at Miss Universe 2020 competition, where she placed as 2nd runner up.
