= Camila Escribens =

Peruvian beauty pageant titleholder

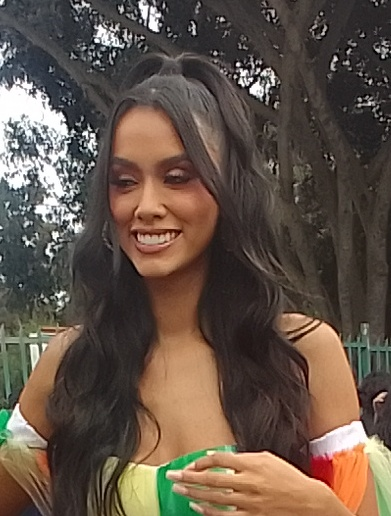
- Beauty pageant titleholder
- Title: Miss Grand Peru 2019; Miss Peru 2023
- Major competitions: Miss Perú 2019; (Miss Grand Peru 2019); Miss Grand International 2019; (Top 10); Miss Peru 2023; (Winner); Miss Universe 2023; (Top 10)

Camila Escribens is a Peruvian model and former beauty pageant titleholder who won Miss Peru 2023, and represented Peru at Miss Universe 2023 in San Salvador, El Salvador, where she reached the top 10.

== Pageantry ==
On October 21, 2018, Escribens represented Comunidad USA at Miss Perú 2019. She finished as the first runner-up and earned the title of Miss Grand Peru 2019, earning the right to represent Peru at Miss Grand International 2019. Escribens represented Peru at Miss Grand International 2019 in Caracas, Venezuela, where she reached the top 10. Escribens went on to represent Peru at Miss Universe 2023 in San Salvador, El Salvador, where she reached the top 10..

== Modeling career ==
In 2024, Escribens signed with the Wilhelmina Models agency in Miami.

Awards and achievements
Preceded by Mariana Abad	Miss USA Peru; 2019	Succeeded by Janick Maceta
Preceded by Andrea Moberg	Miss Grand Peru; 2019	Succeeded by Samantha Batallanos
Preceded by Alessia Rovegno	Miss Peru; 2023	Succeeded by Tatiana Calmell
