= Miss Perú 2014 =

- Date: April 12, 2014
- Presenters: Jorge Beleván; Elba Fahsbender
- Venue: Parque de la Amistad, Lima, Peru
- Broadcaster: Panamericana Televisión
- Entrants: 19
- Placements: 12
- Winner: Jimena Espinoza; Region Lima
- Congeniality: Debbie López; Madre de Dios
- Photogenic: Sofía del Pinho; Huánuco

Miss Peru 2014 was the 61st edition of the Miss Peru pageant, held at the Parque de la Amistad in Lima, Peru, on April 12, 2014.

Cindy Mejía of Lima crowned Jimena Espinoza of Lima as her successor at the end of the event.

== Results ==
=== Placements ===
Placement	Contestant
Miss Peru 2014	Region Lima – Jimena Espinoza
1st Runner-Up	Lambayeque – Ximena Montenegro
2nd Runner-Up	Huánuco – Sofía del Pinho
3rd Runner-Up	Ica – Elizabeth Márquez
4th Runner-Up	Ucayali – Zully Barrantes
5th Runner-Up	Cuzco – Nadia Pucce
Top 12	Arequipa – Grecia Cueva; Europe Perú – Rosina Silvestri; La Libertad – María Fernanda Mejía; Madre de Dios – Debbie López; Pasco – Ducelia Echevarría; San Martín – Brunella Horna

== Special awards ==
- Best Regional Costume - Cuzco – Nadia Pucce
- Miss Photogenic - Huánuco – Sofía del Pinho
- Miss Elegance - Europe Perú – Rosina Silvestri
- Miss Body - Ica – Elizabeth Márquez
- Best Hair - Region Lima – Jimena Espinoza Vecco
- Miss Congeniality - Madre de Dios – Debbie López
- Most Beautiful Face - Lambayeque – Ximena Montenegro
- Best Smile - Cuzco – Nadia Pucce
- Miss Internet - Lambayeque – Ximena Montenegro
- Miss Fitness - Pasco – Ducelia Echevarría
- Miss Silhouette - Huánuco – Sofía del Pinho

.

== Delegates ==
- Amazonas – Breatzy Andrea Acha Rodríguez
- Arequipa – Grecia Natalia Cueva Arredondo
- Cajamarca – Morena Verástegui Córdoba
- Callao – Carmen Sifuentes Peña
- Cuzco – Nadia Luisa Pucce Fernández
- Europe Perú – Rosina Alberta Silvestri
- Huánuco – Sofía del Pinho
- Ica – Elizabeth Nicole Márquez Torrelavega
- Junín – Stephanie Asunción Chávez Beltrán
- La Libertad – María Fernanda Mejía Schioppi
- Lambayeque – Ximena Montenegro
- Madre de Dios – Debbie Fabiana López Ordinola
- Pasco – Ducelia Echevarría
- Piura – Cynthia Yahdira Toth Gutiérrez
- Region Lima – Jimena Espinoza Rumini Vecco
- San Martín – Brunella Horna
- Tumbes – Naomi Shanel León Pérez
- Ucayali – Zully Barrantes
- USA Peru – María del Pilar Alvarado Heredia

== Judges ==
- Dr. Walter Cruzálegui – Plastic Surgeon
- Gracia Adrianzen – CEO of Kinko's Producciones
- Miguel Camasca – CEO of Padma Spa
- Elmer Mathews – Director of Casa de Modas D'Luxe
- Nicole Faverón – Miss Perú 2012
- Dr. Juan Enrique Bazán – Director of Centro Oral Clinic
- Miguel Montalvo – Manager of Montalvo Salon & Spa
- Jimmy Pérez-Johnson – President of Peruanitos Foundation Org.
- Luis Miguel Ciccia – Manager of Transportes CIVA
- Sandra Arias Schreiber – Image Consultant and Director of Sachs Image
- Rider Noriega – Director of NUOVA

== Background Music ==
- Opening Show – "Wake Me Up!" by Avicii
- Swimsuit Competition – "Happy" by Pharrell Williams
- Evening Gown Competition – "Rolling In The Deep" by Adele

== Miss World Peru ==
Miss World Peru 2014 was chosen on August 14, 2013, Elected a year before to improve her training (same as Marina Mora and Elba Fahsbender). The winner was Sofía Rivera who represented Peru at Miss World 2014.

=== Results ===
Placement	Contestant
Miss World Peru 2014	Pasco – Sofía Rivera
Miss Grand Peru 2014	Region Lima – Sophía Venero
1st Runner-Up	Ucayali – Diana Rengifo
Top 7	Piura – Brunella Fossa; La Libertad – Fiorella Valderrama; Amazonas – Stephanie Benalcázar; Ica – Elizabeth Márquez

== Special awards ==
- Miss Internet – Amazonas – Stephanie Benalcázar
- Miss Attitude – Pasco – Sofía Rivera
- Miss Photogenic – Ucayali – Diana Rengifo
- Miss Congeniality – Arequipa – Cynthia Delgado
- Miss Elegance – Region Lima – Sophía Venero
- Miss Body – Pasco – Sofía Rivera
- Miss Smile – Region Lima – Sophía Venero
- Miss Silhouette – Pasco – Sofía Rivera
- Talent Show Pasco – Sofía Rivera
- Top Model – Region Lima – Sophía Venero
- Beauty with Purpose – Madre de Dios – Verónica Gonzáles
- Sports Award – Piura – Brunella Fossa
- Miss Evolution Anti Age – Amazonas – Stephanie Benalcázar

== MWP Delegates ==
- Amazonas – Stephanie Karine Benalcázar Avellaneda
- Arequipa – Cynthia Esther Delgado Campos
- Ayacucho – Diana Úrsula Ascoy Quezada
- Cajamarca – Jimena Valeria Alarcón Carranza
- Callao – Almendra Castillo O'Brien
- Distrito Capital – Débora Barrantes Brown
- Ica – Elizabeth Márquez
- Junín – Alejandra Balbuena Gucchioli
- La Libertad – Fiorella Valderrama Alonso
- Lambayeque – Mariel Llontop Baldera
- Madre de Dios – Verónica Gonzáles Sánchez
- Pasco – Sofía Rivera
- Piura – Brunella Fossa Gomero
- Region Lima – Sophía Venero
- Ucayali – Diana Rengifo

== MWP Judges ==
- Juan Carlos Zurek – Mayor of La Molina District
- Nicole Faverón – Miss Perú 2012 and Director of Nicole Faverón Model Agency and School
- Victor Hugo Montalvo – Director and CEO of Montalvo Salon & Spa
- Elmer Mathews – Director of Casa de Modas D'Luxe
- Olga Zumarán – Miss Perú 1978
- Rider Noriega – CEO of Línea Nuova
- Mario Alegre – Marketing manager of Personal Training
- Dr. Walter Cruzálegui – Plastic Surgeon and Director of Cruzálegui Clinic
- Carlos Alberto Medina – CEO of Dermocell
- Miguel Camasca – CEO of Padma Spa
- Dr. José Ramos – Director of Oftalmosalud Clinic
- Dr. Juan Enrique Bazán – Director of Centro Oral Clinic
- Kiko Asto – CEO of Atlantic City Casino
- Luis Carlos Cárdenas – CEO of Gli Abiti
- Dr. Viviana Guerrero – Dental Surgeon
- Gracia Adrianzén – CEO of Kinko's Producciones
- Sandra Arias Schreiber – Image Consultant and Director of Sachs Image
- Dr. Natalia Córdova – Director of Evolution Anti Age Clinic
