= Niva Antezana =

Peruvian model and beauty pageant titleholder (born 2004) in Peru

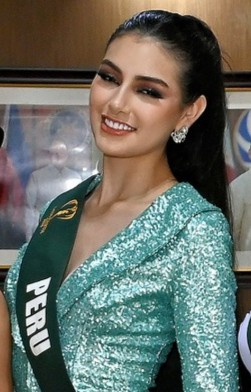
- Antezana in 2024
- Born: Niva Antezana; December 16, 2004 (age 21); Lima, Peru
- Beauty pageant titleholder
- Title: Miss Earth Peru 2024; Miss Earth - Fire 2024
- Major competitions: Miss Grand Peru 2024; (1st Runner-up); Miss Earth 2024; (Miss Earth - Fire)

Niva Antezana (born December 16, 2004) is a Peruvian model and beauty pageant titleholder who was crowned Miss Earth - Fire 2024 when she competed at Miss Earth 2024. She previously finished as first runner-up at Miss Grand Peru 2024.

== Pageantry ==
=== Miss Grand Peru 2024 ===
Antezana competed in the Miss Grand Peru 2024 competition as Lima's representative, where she finished as first runner-up to Arlette Rujel of Callao.

=== Miss Earth 2024 ===
Antezana was appointed as Peru's representative to the Miss Earth 2024 competition. During the pre-pageant activities, she won the gold medal in the eco group for the upcycling fashion show held at the National Teacher's College in Manila. She was also awarded as Vonwelt Nature Farm Ambassadress alongside Patricia Lagunes and Bianca Caraballo of Mexico and Puerto Rico respectively.

At the end of the event, Antezana was crowned Miss Earth - Fire 2024, Peru's highest placement in 16 years.

Awards and achievements
Preceded by (Thailand) Cora Bliault	Miss Earth Fire; 2024	Succeeded by (Chile) Nathalie Briones
Preceded by Nancy Salazar	Miss Earth Peru; 2024	Succeeded by Massiel Suárez
