= PNTM =

PNTM may refer to:

- Peru's Next Top Model
- Philippines' Next Top Model
- Top Model. Zostań modelką, also known as Poland's Next Top Model

(all three Top Model franchises based from America's Next Top Model)
