= Miss Perú 2017 =

- Date: September 22nd, 2017
- Presenters: Jessica Newton, Valeria Piazza, Laura Spoya
- Venue: Country Club Lima Hotel
- Winner: Prissila Howard; Piura

Due to restructuring in the Miss Peru Organization, the national pageant was prevented to be held earlier in the year as originally planned.

Jessica Newton, national Director of the Miss Perú pageant planned a special ceremony on September 22 that took place at the Country Club Lima Hotel in San Isidro, Lima, Peru.

The outgoing titleholder, Valeria Piazza of Lima crowned her successor, Prissila Howard of Piura at the end of the event.

The crowning featured the assistance of special guest Miss Universe 2016, Iris Mittenaere of France.

Howard was appointed to represent Peru at Miss Universe 2017. She was the first runner-up at the 2016 edition of the national pageant. She represented Peru at Miss Grand International 2016 in Las Vegas where she placed in the Top 10, finishing sixth overall.

Piazza and Mittenaere also assisted in the crowning of María José Lora and Lorena Larriviere to represent Peru at the international level. Lora is a 27-year-old Entrepreneur/Business Owner of L'belle Model Management with the height of 6 feet. Larriviere is a known Peruvian model, nutritionist, and she also was the 1st runner-up at the Miss Peru 2015 pageant.

Lora went on to become the fourth Peruvian to win a major title when she won the title Miss Grand International 2017. Larriviere finished in the Top 10 of Reina Hispanoamericana 2017.

== Results ==
=== Placements ===
Placement	Contestant
Miss World Peru 2017	Amazonas – Pamela Sánchez
Miss Earth Peru 2017	San Martín – Karen Rojas
Miss Supranational Peru 2017	Region Lima – Lesly Reyna
Runner-Up	Ancash – Gioconda Florian
Top 8	La Libertad – Ana Maria Villalobos; Tacna – Andrea Pacheco; Ucayali – Giannina Valdez; Huánuco – Mayra Panduro

=== Appointments ===
Title	Delegate
Miss Peru 2017	Piura – Prissila Howard
Miss Peru International 2017	Distrito Capital – Tiffany Lopez
Miss Grand Peru 2017	Trujillo – María José Lora
Miss Peru Hispanoamericana 2017	Jesús María – Lorena Larriviere

== 2017 Miss World Peru Pageant ==
The Miss World Perú 2017 pageant was held on the night of April 29, 2017. 14 candidates competed for the crown.

The outgoing titleholder, Miss World Peru 2016, Pierina Wong of Lambayeque crowned her successor, Pamela Sánchez of Amazonas as the end of the event.

Sánchez represented Peru at Miss World 2017, where she placed in the Top 40. Reyna placed in the Top 20 at Miss Supranational 2017.

== Special awards ==
- Best Model - Region Lima - Lesly Reyna
- Miss Talent- Ucayali - Giannina Valdez
- Miss Sport - Tacna - Andrea Pacheco
- Beauty with Purpose - Ancash - Gioconda Florian

== Delegates ==
- Amazonas - Pamela Sanchez
- Áncash - Gioconda Florian
- Arequipa - Ana Paula Fernandez
- Cajamarca - Solange Aparicio
- Cañete - Sandra Lock
- Huánuco - Mayra Panduro
- Junín - Pamela Marrache
- La Libertad - Ana Maria Villalobos
- Mollendo - Sandra Boitano
- Region Lima - Lesly Reyna
- San Martín - Karen Rojas
- Sullana - Tatyana Reusche
- Tacna - Andrea Pacheco
- Ucayali - Giannina Valdez
