= Romina Lozano =

Peruvian model

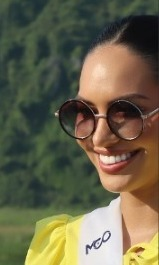
- Lozano in 2024
- Born: Romina Lozano Saldaña; November 6, 1996 (age 29); Bellavista, San Martin, Peru
- Height: 1.78 m (5 ft 10 in)
- Beauty pageant titleholder
- Title: Miss Callao 2017; Miss Perú 2018
- Hair color: Dark Brown
- Eye color: Dark Brown
- Major competitions: Miss Callao 2017; (Winner); Miss Perú 2018; (Winner); Miss Universe 2018; (Unplaced); Miss Cosmo 2024; (Top 5)

Romina Lozano Saldaña (born November 6, 1996) is a Peruvian model and beauty pageant titleholder who won Miss Peru 2018 on October 29, 2017, and represented Peru at Miss Universe 2018 pageant.

== Personal life ==
Lozano was born in the district of Bellavista, in the city of San Martin Region in Peru. She is currently living in Lima. She graduated from Commercial Aviation and doing her second degree in Nutrition Science.

== Pageantry ==
=== Elite Model Look Peru 2016 ===
Lozano participated in the Elite Model Model Look Peru 2016, where they choose a model to represent Peru in the international Elite Model Look contest, competing without success.

=== Miss Callao 2017 ===
Lozano competed in Miss Callao 2017, which was held on the night of February 18, 2017, where she won and was crowned by Valeria Piazza, the Miss Peru 2016.

=== Miss Perú 2018 ===
Like Miss Callao 2017, she represented Callao in the Miss Peru 2018, which was held at the Municipal Theater of Lima, on October 29, 2017. The event became the most controversial Miss Peru platform, by promoting the opposition of violence against women, with an average of 23 candidates announcing the measures of daily violence suffered by women in Peru. Finally, Lozano was the winner and was crowned by Prissila Howard of Piura, the outgoing Miss Peru 2017.

=== Miss Universe 2018 ===
As Miss Peru 2018, Lozano competed at the Miss Universe 2018 pageant but was not placed in the Top 20.

=== Miss Cosmo 2024 ===
As the first ever Miss Cosmo Peru, Lozano placed in the Top 5 on Miss Cosmo 2024 which was held on October 5, 2024 in Vietnam.

Awards and achievements
Preceded by Prissila Howard	Miss Peru; 2018	Succeeded by Kelin Rivera
Preceded by None	Miss Cosmo Peru; 2024	Succeeded by Kelin Rivera
Preceded by None	Miss Cosmo (Top 5); 2024	Succeeded by (Brazil) Gabriela Borges (Myanmar) Myint Myat Moe (Panama) Italy Mora
