= Danea Panta =

Peruvian model (born 1991)

- Born: Danea Juanita Panta Vargas; March 26, 1991 (age 35); Trujillo, Peru
- Education: National University of Trujillo
- Height: 1.75 m (5 ft 9 in)
- Beauty pageant titleholder
- Title: Miss Peru International 2016
- Hair color: Black
- Eye color: Brown
- Major competitions: Miss Peru 2009 (Unplaced); Miss Peru 2016 (2nd Runner-up); Miss International 2016 (Unplaced); Miss Emerald International 2020 (Winner)

Danea Juanita Panta Vargas (born March 26, 1991) is a Peruvian beauty pageant titleholder who represented Peru at the Miss International 2016 pageant.

She won the only edition of Peru’s Next Top Model in 2013.

She also won Miss Emerald Pageant 2020 in July this year.

Currently she lives in London where she is working with Premier Model Management an agency that also represents models Linda Evangelista and Naomi Campbell.

== Early life ==
She studied law in her native Trujillo. She is the winner of the first Peru's Next Top Model in 2013. At the age of 22, she was the first top model from Peru and traveled to Miami to sign a contract with the MP Mega Miami agency, in addition to winning contracts with Saga Falabella, L'Bel and Pantene. In 2015, she appeared to be a conductor on channel E!.

In 2010, she was the host of a medical program called Consultorio en Casa, issued by the SolTV channel and the "Como en casa" program. In 2012 she participated in singing in the Yo Soy program.

== Miss Peru 2016 and Miss International 2016 ==
In 2016 she participated in Miss Peru, being in third place obtaining the title of Miss Peru International, earning the right to participate in the Miss International contest. She currently lives in London and has starred in campaigns for important brands such as Pond's, NastyGal, Chi chi London, Miss Guided and others.

Awards and achievements
Preceded by Cynthia Toth	Miss Peru International; 2016	Succeeded by Tiffany López
