= Jimena Espinoza =

Peruvian model and beauty pageant titleholder

Jimena Rumini Espinoza Vecco
- Born: Jimena Rumini Espinoza Vecco; 16 September 1989 (age 37); Lima, Peru
- Education: Universidad San Ignacio de Loyola
- Height: 1.80 m (5 ft 11 in)
- Beauty pageant titleholder
- Title: Miss Perú 2014
- Hair color: Brown
- Eye color: Brown
- Major competitions: Miss Perú 2014 (Winner); Miss Universe 2014 (Unplaced)

Jimena Rumini Espinoza Vecco (born September 16, 1989, in Lima) is a Peruvian model and beauty pageant titleholder who won Miss Perú 2014 and represented Peru at the Miss Universe 2014 pageant.

== Early life ==
Jimena Espinoza is a Marketing graduate of San Ignacio de Loyola University. She is a Top Model Professional.

== Pageantry ==
=== Miss Perú 2014 ===
Espinoza was crowned as Miss Perú 2014, and represented Lima and competed at Miss Universe 2014. The 61st Miss Peru pageant was held on April 12, 2014, in Parque de la Amistad in Lima, Peru. The outgoing titleholder of Miss Perú 2013, Cindy Mejía of Lima, crowned her successor at the end of the event. The pageant was televised live on Panamericana Television.

=== Miss Universe 2014 ===
Espinoza represented Peru at Miss Universe 2014, but didn't make it to the Top 15.

Awards and achievements
Preceded by Cindy Mejía	Miss Peru; 2014	Succeeded by Laura Spoya
