= Reina Hispanoamericana 2022 =

31st Reina Hispanoamericana pageant

- Date: March 25, 2023
- Venue: Salón Sirionó, Fexpocruz, Santa Cruz de la Sierra, Bolivia
- Broadcaster: Red Uno
- Entrants: 29
- Placements: 14
- Debuts: Equatorial Guinea; Germany; Italy
- Withdrawals: Aruba; Curaçao
- Returns: Cuba; Guatemala
- Winner: Arlette Rujel; Peru
- Congeniality: Nadia Sommariva; Argentina
- Best National Costume: Camila Riveiro; Guatemala
- Photogenic: Arlette Rujel; Peru

Reina Hispanoamericana 2022 was the 31st Reina Hispanoamericana pageant, held at the Salón Sirionó, Fexpocruz in Santa Cruz de la Sierra, Bolivia, on March 25, 2023.

Andrea Bazarte of Mexico crowned Arlette Rujel of Peru as her successor at the end of the event.

== Results ==
=== Placements ===
Placement	Contestant
Reina Hispanoamericana 2022	Peru – Arlette Rujel
Virreina Hispanoamericana 2022	Venezuela – Adriana Pérez
1st Runner-Up	Brazil – Guilhermina Montarroyos
2nd Runner-Up	Puerto Rico – Ediris Rivera
3rd Runner-Up	Mexico – Diana Robles
4th Runner-Up	Colombia – María Lucía Cuesta
Top 14	Chile – Anita-María Rojas; Costa Rica – Maria Alejandra Acosta; Cuba – Alyanni Trujillo; Dominican Republic – Lady León; Equatorial Guinea – Serafina Ada; Nicaragua – Yenifer Pérez; Philippines – Ingrid Santamaría §; Spain – María José García

§ - Facebook Fan Vote Winner

Order Of Announcements

Top 14

1. Philippines
2. Costa Rica
3. Chile
4. Brazil
5. Venezuela
6. Peru
7. Equatorial Guinea
8. Mexico
9. Puerto Rico
10. Colombia
11. Nicaragua
12. Spain
13. Dominican Republic
14. Cuba

Top 6

1. Mexico
2. Puerto Rico
3. Brazil
4. Venezuela
5. Peru
6. Colombia

== Special awards ==
Award	Contestant	Ref.
Best National Costume	Guatemala - Camila Riveiro	
Miss Amas	Brazil - Guilhermina Montarroyos	
Ambassador of Nueva Santa Cruz	Venezuela - Adriana Pérez	
Best Tanned by Farfalla	Brazil - Guilhermina Montarroyos	
Ambassador of Daewoo	Colombia - María Lucía Cuesta	
Best Silhouette by Medical Center	Brazil - Guilhermina Montarroyos	
Best Smile by Orest	Germany - Geraldine Burger	
Miss Sports by Solaris	Brazil - Guilhermina Montarroyos	
Miss Photogenic by Las Loritas	Peru - Arlette Rujel	
The Experts' Favorite	Brazil - Guilhermina Montarroyos	
Best Top Model by Kosi	Bolivia - Maria Jesús Jiménez	
Miss Congeniality	Argentina - Nadia Sommariva	

== Contestants ==
29 contestants competed for the title:

Country/Territory	Contestant	Age (Note: Ages at the time of the pageant)	Hometown
Argentina	Nadia Sommariva	23	La Plata
Bolivia	María Jesús Jimenez	22	Yacuiba
Brazil	Guilhermina Montarroyos	22	Moreno
Canada	Yuly Pirona	26	Montreal
Chile	Anita-María Rojas	22	La Florida
Colombia	María Lucía Cuesta	23	Quibdó
Costa Rica	María Alejandra Acosta	21	Heredia
Cuba	Alyanni Trujillo	21	Guanajay
Dominican Republic	Lady León	28	Duarte
Ecuador	Heather Valdez	20	Guayaquil
El Salvador	Eugenia Ávalos	27	Usulután
Equatorial Guinea	Serafina Nchama Eyene Ada	23	Niefang
Germany	Geraldine Burger	24	Augsburg
Guatemala	Camila Riveiro	23	Cobán
Haiti	Isnaida Compere	25	Gonaïves
Honduras	Heidy Lemus	27	La Ceiba
Italy	Shanara Ordoñez	19	Milan
Mexico	Diana Robles	25	León
Nicaragua	Yenifer Pérez	25	Managua
Panama	Valentina D’Alessandro	26	Costa del Este
Paraguay	Mandy Eksteen	28	Limpio
Peru	Arlette Rujel	22	Callao
Philippines	Ingrid Santamaria	26	Parañaque
Portugal	Renata Ribeiro	29	Porto
Puerto Rico	Ediris Rivera	27	Carolina
Spain	María José García	22	Antequera
United States	Silvia Colón	22	Jacksonville
Uruguay	Camila Gabarrot	23	Trinidad
Venezuela	Adriana Pérez	23	Porlamar

== Notes ==
=== Debuts ===
- Equatorial Guinea
- Germany
- Italy

=== Returns ===
Last competed in 2019:

- Cuba
- Guatemala
