= Miss Grand Peru 2024 =

2nd edition of the Miss Grand Peru beauty pageant

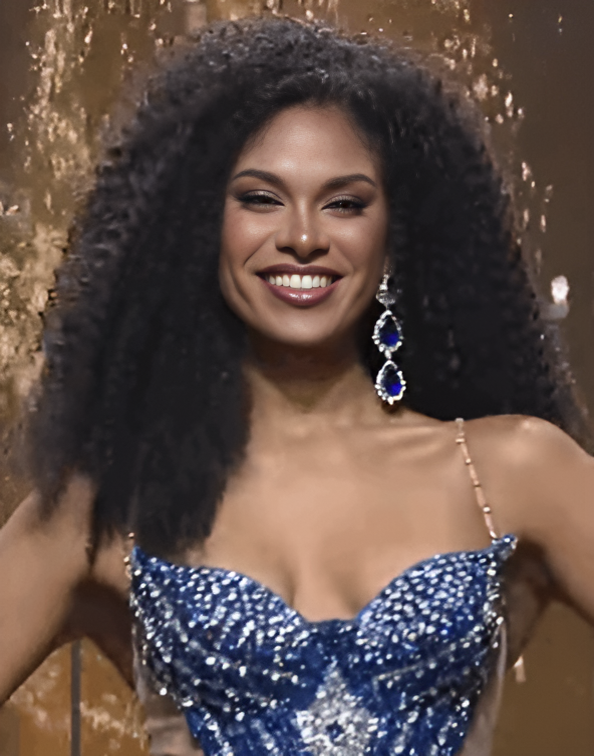
- Arlette Rujel, the winner of the contest
- Date: September 21, 2024
- Venue: La Plaza Central de Punchana, Punchana, Maynas
- Broadcaster: YouTube
- Entrants: 18
- Placements: 8
- Debuts: Ica; Lima Centro; Lima Norte; Lima Región; Tacna; Tumbes
- Withdrawals: Apurímac; Huánuco; Piura; Ucayali
- Winner: Arlette Rujel (Callao)

Miss Grand Peru 2024 was the second edition of the Miss Grand Peru pageant, held at the La Plaza Central de Punchana in Punchana, Peru, on September 21, 2024.

Luciana Fuster crowned Arlette Rujel of Callao as her successor at the end of the event. Rujel later represented Peru at the Miss Grand International 2024 pageant, held on October 25, 2024, in Thailand, and was named one of the fifth runners-up.

This edition is also the first Miss Grand Peru contest for which the regional license was delivered to local organizers.

== Background ==
In this edition, the Miss Grand Peru team distributed the competition licenses to several local organizers who either organized an event to select their state representative or appointed an eligible girl to the title. In case of a lack of local licensees, the representatives were then determined through central auditions conducted by the national team. All contestants were officially revealed in the sashing ceremony organized at the Atlantic City Casino & Sports on August 10, 2024.

Only five regions and cities organized their local pageants to elect representatives for this year's edition, but one withdrew due to the conflict between the local organizer and the president of Miss Grand Peru, Jessica Newton.

The regional preliminary contests for Miss Grand Peru 2024 are detailed below.

Pageant	Edition	Date and venue	Entrants	Ref.
Miss Grand Lambayeque	1st	May 2, 2024, at the Palo Santo Ecolounge, Pimentel	8	
Miss Grand Tumbes	1st	May 4, 2024, at the Andrés Araujo Moran Sports Complex, Tumbes	12	
Miss Nuevo Chimbote (Note: The winner, Daniela Reyna, was automatically assumed Miss Grand Ancash 2024 to compete at Miss Grand Peru 2024.)	N/A	May 4, 2024, at the Teatro Municipal, Nuevo Chimbote	10	
Miss Grand Jaén	1st	June 1, 2024, at the Coliseo Cerrado Señor de Huamantanga, Jaén	9	
Miss Chimbote (Note: The winner, Hilary Paredes, was automatically assumed Miss Grand Chimbote 2024 to compete at Miss Grand Peru 2024, but later withdrew.)	N/A	June 15, 2024, at the Plaza de Armas, Chimbote	11	

== Results ==
Miss Grand Peru 2024 competition result by department
Color key:
Winner	1st RU	2nd RU
3rd RU	Top 8	Unplaced
Withdrew	No representative

Placement	Contestant
Miss Grand Peru 2024	Callao – Arlette Rujel
1st runner-up	Lima – Niva Antezana
2nd runner-up	Lima Centro – Alexandra Parcón
3rd runner-up	Loreto – Andrea Torres (Note: Voted into the Top 8 by viewers.)
Top 8	Ancash – Daniela Reyna; Arequipa – Gysela Neyra; Junín – Andrea San Miguel; La Libertad – Anyella Grados (Note: Withdrew after qualifying for the second phase (Top 8).)

== Contestants ==
Eighteen contestants participated in the first phase in Lima, and only 8 finalists were chosen for the final phase in Punchana.

- Ancash – Daniela Reyna
- Arequipa – Gisela Neyra
- Callao – Arlette Rujel
- Comas – Naomi Solar
- Ica – Carolina Quintanilla
- Jaén – Yeisly Navarro
- Junín – Andrea San Miguel
- Lambayeque – Arianna Sánchez
- La Libertad – Anyella Grados
- Lima – Niva Antezana
- Lima Centro – Alexandra Parcon
- Lima Norte – Brittany Solange Castro
- Lima Región – Axah María Herrera
- Loreto – Andrea Torres
- Rímac – Adriana Maya
- Santa Anita – Dana Martínez
- Tacna – Luciana Agostinelli
- Tumbes – Naomi Maceda

== List of regional coordinators ==
The following is a list of regional coordinators responsible for electing the candidates from the respective regions for this year's edition.

- Ancash – Renso Sotero Ibañez (Miss Nuevo Chimbote Org.)
- Callao – Renzo Alexander Vargas Velasco
- Jaén – Lorena Douglas
- Junín – José Alzamora
- Lambayeque – Erick Díaz Cajo
- Lima – Leo Alvan Loayza
- Lima Centro – Diego Doy
- Loreto – Diva Rivera
- Tacna – Gia Belt (Miss Peru Tacna Org.)
- Tumbes – Alexa Ramirez Villanueva
