= Punchana District =

Coordinates: 3.7250°S 73.2682°W

- District
- Interactive map of Punchana District
- Country: Peru
- Region: Loreto
- Province: Maynas
- Founded: December 16, 1987
- Capital: Punchana

Government
  - Mayor: Jane Donayre Chávez (2019-2022)

Area
  - Total: 1,573.39 km^{2} (607.49 sq mi)
- Elevation: 105 m (344 ft)

Population (2017)
  - Total: 75,210
  - Density: 47.80/km^{2} (123.8/sq mi)
- Time zone: UTC-5 (PET)
- UBIGEO: 160108

Punchana District is one of thirteen districts of the Maynas Province in Peru.
