= World Miss University =

South Korean beauty contest

- Formation: 1986; 40 years ago
- Type: Beauty pageant
- Headquarters: New York City
- Location: United States
- Official language: English
- Chairman: Lee Seung-min
- Website: https://wmu.world/

World Miss University is an international beauty contest held annually in Seoul, Korea since 1986, with an average of about 70 contestants every year. The event is to select World Miss University Peace Corp Representatives.

This event was organized by the International Association of University Presidents. After the United Nations named 1986 the Year of Peace, the organizing committee dispatched peace missions to regions in conflict like Kosovo and Rwanda. These days, the event is organized by the World Miss University Organizing Committee which has headquarter in Manhattan, New York, United States.

== Winners ==
Year	Contestant	Country	Place of Venue	Entrants
1986	Rosalie van Breemen	Netherlands	Seoul, South Korea	21
1987	Choi Yeon-hee (최연희)	South Korea	Seoul, South Korea	21
1988	Kathryn Elizabeth Coonz	United States	Seoul, South Korea	43
1989	Priyadarshini Pradhan	India	Tokyo, Japan	56
1990	Ekaterina Parfenova	Soviet Union	Seoul, South Korea	73
1991	Celeste Weaver	United States	Seoul, South Korea	66
1992	Heiðrún Anna Björnsdóttir	Iceland	Seoul, South Korea	59
1993	Ewa Wachowicz	Poland	Taejon, South Korea	68
1995	Birgitta Ína Unnarsdóttir	Iceland	Seoul, South Korea	46
1996	Laura García	Spain	Gangwon, South Korea	45
1997	Jang Jee-hun (장지훈)	South Korea	Suwon, South Korea	50
2000	Renata Fan	Brazil	Seoul, South Korea	46
2001	Eleni Pechlivanidi	Greece	Seoul, South Korea	33
2003	Ayusha Shrestha	Nepal	Daegu, South Korea	30
2004	Julija Djadenko	Latvia	Shenzhen, China	36
2005	Jade Collins	New Zealand	Seoul, South Korea	26
2006	Cristiana Frixione	Nicaragua	Jeju Island, South Korea	43
2007	Aleksandra Plemic	Germany	Seoul, South Korea	46
2008	Sarnai Amar	Mongolia	Shenzhen, China	34
2009	Cho Eun-ju (조은주)	South Korea	Seoul, South Korea	36
2010	Katie Farr	England	Seoul, South Korea	42
2011	Siria Ysabel Bojorquez	United States	Gangwon, South Korea	64
2012	Mia Hasanagic	Denmark	Seoul, South Korea	44
2014	Karina Stephania Martin Jiménez	Mexico	Gangwon, South Korea	30
2016	Kelin Rivera	Peru	Beijing, China	57
2017	Claudia Moras Baez	Cuba	Phnom Penh, Cambodia	83
2018	Adriana Moya	Costa Rica	Seoul, South Korea	50
2019	Nguyễn Thị Thanh Khoa	Vietnam	Jeju Island, South Korea	36
2022	Isabella Oldenburg	Costa Rica	Seoul, South Korea	75
2026	Tatyana Politova	Russia	Incheon, South Korea	52

== Countries by number of title wins ==
Country	Titles	Year(s)
United States	3	1988, 1991, 2011
South Korea	3	1987, 1997, 2009
Iceland	2	1992, 1995
Costa Rica	2	2018, 2022
Russia	1	2026
Vietnam	1	2019
Cuba	1	2017
Peru	1	2016
Mexico	1	2014
Denmark	1	2012
England	1	2010
Mongolia	1	2008
Germany	1	2007
Nicaragua	1	2006
New Zealand	1	2005
Latvia	1	2004
Nepal	1	2003
Greece	1	2001
Brazil	1	2000
Spain	1	1996
Poland	1	1993
Soviet Union	1	1990
India	1	1989
Netherlands	1	1986

== Winners gallery ==
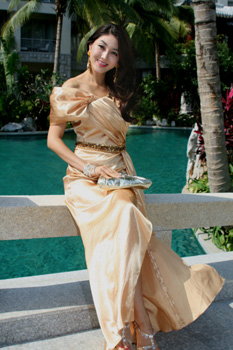
World Miss University 2009
Jo Eun-joo, South Korea

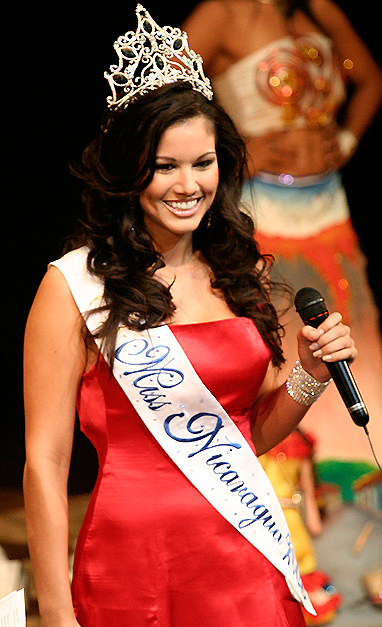
World Miss University 2006
Cristiana Frixione, Nicaragua

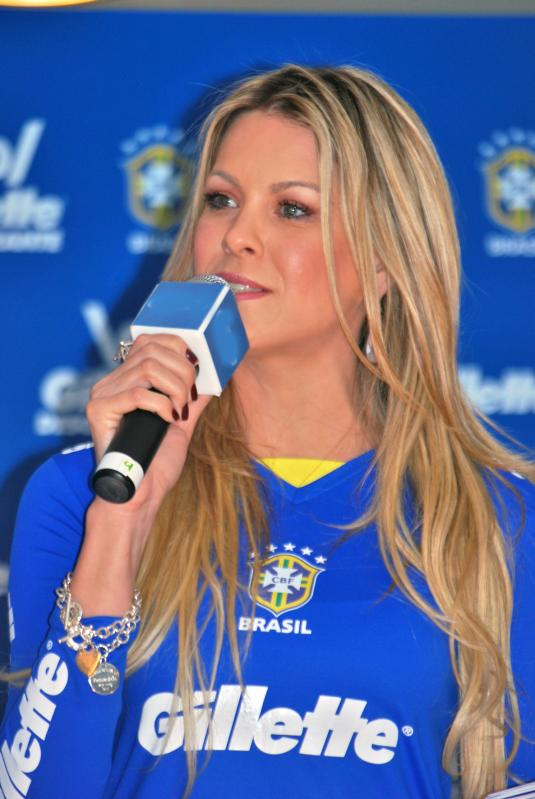
World Miss University 2000
Renata Fan, Brazil

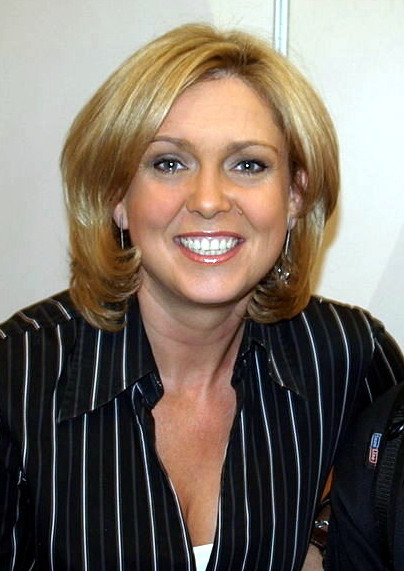
World Miss University 1993
Ewa Wachowicz, Poland

== List of runners-up ==
Year	1st Runner-up	2nd Runner-up	3rd Runner-up	4th Runner-up	5th Runner-up
1986	Choi Yeon-hee; South Korea	not awarded	not awarded	not awarded	not awarded
1988	Mervi Hannele Lehto; Finland	Ghyong Ying Chen; Taiwan	not awarded	not awarded	not awarded
1989	Han Heui-jeong; South Korea	Kyle Allison Kirby; Ireland	not awarded	not awarded	not awarded
1990	unknown	unknown	not awarded	not awarded	not awarded
1991	Yuliya Shestopalova; Ukraine	unknown	Elina Kefi; Greece	not awarded	not awarded
1992	Polina Zhuravlyova-Vikhovskaya; Russia	Susanty Manuhutu; Indonesia	not awarded	not awarded	not awarded
1993	Viive Saul; Estonia	Lirian Souza Soares; Brazil	not awarded	not awarded	not awarded
1995	Jo Hee-seon; South Korea 2	Lee Suk-gyeong; South Korea 4	Mônica Regina Guimarães Ferreira; Brazil	Holga Stiereshkovac; Kazakhstan 2	not awarded
1996	Sun Song-ji; South Korea	Julia Kowalska; Poland	not awarded	not awarded	not awarded
1997	Agnieszka Zielinska; Poland	unknown	not awarded	not awarded	not awarded
2000	Sandra Bretones; France	Lilita Leice; Latvia	Ha So-young; South Korea	Anna Dantchenko; Greece	Ganna Vruglevska; Ukraine
2001	Daniela Estefania Puig; Argentina	Emelie Lundqvist; Sweden	Tipsupar Rungreungsri; Thailand	Claudia Patricia Alaniz; Nicaragua	Adriana Reis; Brazil
2003	Roxana Florina Curelea; Moldova	Medha Raghunath; India	Lee Soo-jin; South Korea	Shana Van Beers; Belgium	not awarded
2004	Ahn Ji-soo; South Korea	Yang Hua; China	not awarded	not awarded	not awarded
2005	Varga Tiffany; South Africa	Katrine Ozolina; Latvia	not awarded	not awarded	not awarded
2006	Marcela De Almeida; Brazil	Aurelie Bonvalet; France	not awarded	not awarded	not awarded
2007	Rita Bernotaite; Lithuania	Chukwudube Usowanne; Nigeria	not awarded	not awarded	not awarded
2008	Mariana Oliveira Marques; Brazil	Jang Ye-eun; South Korea	not awarded	not awarded	not awarded
2009	Salcy Lima; Brazil	Anna Maria Tarnowska; Poland	not awarded	not awarded	not awarded
2010	Katarzyna Kuziemska; Poland	Choi Jung-hwa; South Korea	not awarded	not awarded	not awarded
2011	Monika Plochocka; Poland	Swetha Sridhar; India	not awarded	not awarded	not awarded
2012	Elina Grundane; Latvia	Kim Eun-sol; South Korea 1	not awarded	not awarded	not awarded
2014	Siboninkosi Hobe; Zimbabwe	Juliete de Pieri; Brazil	Isabel Maria Pinho Vieira Portugal	Nomin-Erdene Bat-Erdene Mongolia	not awarded
2016	Heyi Li; Macau	Anzhelika Rublevska; Pakistan	Nagma Shrestha; Nepal	not awarded	not awarded
2017	Huerta Torres Denise; United States	Daniela Gods Romanovska; Latvia	Suat Tomrongpich sao Cambodia	Kasia Szklarczyk; Poland	Okeke Jessica Ugosinachi; Nigeria
2018	Matrosova Karolina; Latvia	Yitong Xu; China	Cindy Han; South Korea	Plotytsia Bohdana; Ukraine	Michelle Garibay; Mexico
2019	Ekaterina Petsonkina; Estonia	Wichida Nuamsorn; Thailand	Sophia Fröba; Germany	Puja Lestari; Indonesia	Han Min-hee; South Korea
2022	Dominique Doucette; Canada	Montse Larrondo Avalos; Chile	Jasmine Huang; New Zealand	Rehema Wasike Faith; Kenya	Park Jin-ah; South Korea
2026	Mary Collette Santiago Tibayan; Philippines	Keshni Deeksha Nundlaul; Mauritius	Kang Min-soo; South Korea	Jayanti Monicatri; Indonesia	Anel Wethmar; South Africa

== Continental Awards ==
Year	World Miss University Asia	World Miss University Europe	World Miss University Africa	World Miss University America		World Miss University Oceania
Year	World Miss University Asia	World Miss University Europe	World Miss University Africa	World Miss University North America	World Miss University South America	World Miss University Oceania
1995	Jo Seung-hee; South Korea	Joanna Brykczinska Poland; Anna Kirashova Russia	not awarded	María Teresa Aragón; Mexico	Alicia Gesella; El Salvador	Rhonda Vanderbeek; Australia
2014	Kanty Widjaja; Indonesia	Mathilde Duriez; France	Siboninkosi Hobe; Zimbabwe	Karina Stephania Martín Jiménez; Mexico		not awarded
2016	Rewati Chetri; India	Moreira Ana Catarina Pereira; Portugal	Valerie Gugulethu Chingonzo; Zimbabwe	not awarded	Lourdes Merli Salinas; Argentina	not awarded
2017	Loh Shi Min; Malaysia	Makin Ellie; England	Makune Queen Elizabeth William; Tanzania	Mariana Geranetzi Ortega Molina; Mexico	Lira Gonzalez Eilyn Pamela; Guatemala	not awarded
2018	Paitoon Kotchaphan; Thailand	Grace Molly; Wales	Obondo Betty Muzarika; Kenya	Dawes Brittany-Anne; Canada	Samantha Rampersad; Trinidad and Tobago	not awarded
2026	Kanjana Na Kalasin; Thailand	Maria Solonari; Moldova	Pearl Rowena Rowe; Kenya	Britney Samanta Kappes Astudillo; United States	Kayanne Coutinho de Sousa; Brazil	not awarded

== Notes ==
Notes
List
  - (1987 Winner Choi Yeon-hee likely hand-picked by virtue of being 1st Runner-up in 1986)
  === Crossover ===
  - Miss International 1984: Holland - Rosalie van Breemen
  - Miss Universe 1987: India - Priyadarshini Pradhan
  - Miss World 1988 (1st r-up): South Korea - Choi Yeon-hee
  - Miss World 2007 (Dress): South Korea - Cho Eun-ju
  - Miss Supranational 2019: South Korea - Kwon Whee
  - Miss World 1992 (Top 5): Poland - Ewa Wachowicz
  - Miss Universe 1995 (Essences): Indonesia - Susanty Manuhutu
  - Miss Universe 1999: Brazil - Renata Fan
  - Miss Universe 2006: Nicaragua - Cristiana Frixione
  - Miss International 2006: Canada - Emily Ann Kiss
  - Reinado Internacional del Café 2012: Canada - Emily Ann Kiss
  - Miss Global 2013 (Winner): Canada - Emily Ann Kiss
  - Miss World 2010 (Top 25): Mongolia - Sarnai Amar
  - Miss Earth 2012 (Top 8): Nepal -Nagma Shrestha
  - Miss Eco International 2016 (Video): Nepal -Nagma Shrestha
  - Miss Universe 2017: Nepal -Nagma Shrestha
  - Miss Multiverse 2016 (Winner): United States -Siria Ysabel Bojorquez
  - Miss Asean Friendship 2017 (Top 10): Vietnam - To Mai Thuy Duong
  - Miss Supranational 2015 (4th r-up): Mexico - Karina Martin
  - Reina Hispanoamericana 2013 (Elegance): Peru - Kelin Rivera
  - Reinado Internacional de la Ganaderia 2014 (1st r-up): Peru - Kelin Rivera
  - Miss Eco International 2018 (2nd r-up): Peru - Kelin Rivera
  - Miss Universe 2019 (Top 10): Peru - Kelin Rivera
  - Miss Cosmo 2025 (Top 21): Peru - Kelin Rivera
  - Miss Intercontinental 2018 (1st r-up): Costa Rica - Adriana Moya
  - Miss Grand International 2021 (Top 10): Costa Rica - Adriana Moya
  - Miss Teenager Universe 2015 (Winner): Canada - Dominique Doucette
  - Miss Cosmo 2024: Canada - Dominique Doucette
  - Miss Universe 2021: El Salvador - Alejandra Gavidia
  - Miss Tourism International 2023 (1st r-up): United Kingdom - Emily Cossey
  - Miss World Noble Queen 2023 (Winner): Moldova -Maria Solonari
