= Cho Eun-ju =

South Korean reporter (born 1983)

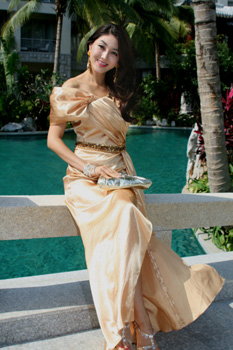
- Eun-Ju Cho in Miss World 2007 in China.
- Born: South Korea
- Citizenship: Korean South Korea
- Occupation: News Reporter
- Known for: Miss World Best dresser

Cho Eun-ju (Korean: 조은주; born 1983) is a South Korean news reporter and beauty pageant titleholder who represented South Korea at Miss World 2007. She won the title of World Miss University in 2010.

== Personal life ==
In personal life, Cho Eun-ju is married to a corporate executive, Beom jun Seo since 2012. The wedding ceremony took place at the Dynasty Hall of Hotel Shilla on 2012.

== Social Activity ==
Cho Eun-ju is an ambassador of different NGO's including UN Chronicle Ambassador, the Happy Foundation, the Korean Association of Children's Diabetes, the Korean Disabled People Society, and the Korean Society for Leukemia .
