= Miss Perú 2018 =

- Date: October 29, 2017
- Presenters: Cristian Rivero & Karen Schwarz
- Venue: Municipal Theatre, Lima, Peru
- Broadcaster: Latina Televisión
- Entrants: 23
- Placements: 13
- Winner: Romina Lozano; Callao

The Miss Peru 2018 pageant was held on the night of October 29, 2017. This national beauty contest was held in the historic centre's Municipal Theatre in Lima, Peru, after weeks of events.

The outgoing titleholder, Prissila Howard of Piura crowned her successor, Romina Lozano of Callao at the end of the event.

Lozano represented Peru at Miss Universe 2018.

The first and second runners-up were also selected to represent Peru at the international level, as Andrea Moberg and Kelin Rivera represented Peru at the Miss Grand International 2018 and Miss Eco International pageants, respectively.

The pageant was broadcast by Latina Television for the first time since 2004. The event was hosted by presenter Cristian Rivero with the outside commenting of Miss Peru 2009, Karen Schwarz.

This election became a platform opposing violence against women in Peru: when the 23 candidates took the floor to specify their measurements, each one announced a figure corresponding to the daily violence suffered by women living in Peru. The sequence ended with the following message from the presenter: "Tonight we are not only talking about these 23 women, tonight we are talking about all the women in our country who have rights and deserve respect".

These statements can relate to the complaint of the Weinstein case and were echoed by demonstrations against gender violence and feminicides in the country.

== Results ==
=== Placements ===
Placement	Contestant
Miss Peru 2018	Callao – Romina Lozano
1st Runner-Up	Loreto – Andrea Moberg
2nd Runner-Up	Arequipa – Kelin Rivera
Top 6	Distrito Capital – Jessica McFarlane; Huánuco – Luciana Fernández; Region Lima – Samantha Batallanos
Top 9	La Libertad – Melody Calderon; Ica – Belgica Guerra; Rímac – Juana Acevedo
Top 13	Piura – Maria Jose Seminario; Tacna – Vania Osusky; San Juan de Miraflores – Pilar Orue; Chorrillos – Kristel Aranda

== Special Awards ==
- Best Regional Costume - Ucayali - Diana Rengifo
- Miss Photogenic - Huanuco- Luciana Fernandez
- Miss Elegance - Arequipa - Kelin Rivera
- Best Hair - Tacna - Vania Osusky
- Most Beautiful Face - Huanuco- Luciana Fernandez
- Best Smile - Piura - Maria Jose Seminario
- Miss Internet - Loreto - Andrea Moberg
- Miss Rosa - Loreto - Andrea Moberg

.

== Delegates ==
- Arequipa - Kelin Rivera
- Cajamarca - Melina Machuca
- Callao - Romina Lozano
- Cañete - Almendra Marroquin
- Chorrillos - Kristel Aranda
- Distrito Capital - Jessica McFarlane
- Huánuco - Luciana Fernandez
- Ica - Belgica Guerra
- Iquitos - Fabiola Diaz Zubiate
- La Libertad - Melody Calderon
- La Punta - Camila Canicoba
- Loreto - Andrea Moberg
- Piura - Maria Jose Seminario
- Region Lima - Samantha Batallanos
- Rímac - Juana Acevedo
- San Juan de Miraflores - Pilar Orue
- Spain Perú - Susan Rodriguez
- Sullana - Karen Cueto
- Tacna - Vania Osusky
- Trujillo - Noelia Castro
- Tumbes - Pierina Melendez
- Ucayali - Diana Rengifo
- Villa El Salvador - Francesca Chavez

== Notes ==
- Romina Lozano competed in Miss Universe 2018 but it went to unplaced.
- While Jessica McFarlane competed in Reina Hispanoamericana 2018 and placed as 7th Runner-up.
- Samantha Batallanos competed in Miss Landscapes International 2018 and placed as 2nd Runner-up.

== Judges ==
- Magaly Medina - Peruvian journalist and Television producer
- Jessica Newton - President of the Miss Peru Organization
- Luciana Olivares - Strategy and Content Manager at Latina Televisión
- Micael Seo - LG Electronics Marketing Manager
- Dr. Paola Ochoa - Director of Dental Esthetics of Infinity Dental Clinic
- Deborah de Souza - Miss Peru 1993
- Selene Noblecilla - President of Reina Mundial Banano pageant
- Ernesto Bejarano - Marketing Manager of Marina Salt - EMSAL S.A.
- Lady Guillén - Peruvian TV presenter

== Music & Special Guests Singers ==
- Swimsuit Competition – Leslie Shaw - "Siempre Mas Fuerte"
- Evening Gown Competition – Deyvis Orosco - "Nectar Medley" (El Arbolito/ Ojitos Hechizeros/ No Te Creas Tan Importante)
- Mirella Paz – Miss Peru Anthem (composed by Coco Tafur)
- Ezio Oliva & Jonathan Molly - "Como le Hago"
