= Miss Perú 2013 =

- Date: June 30, 2012
- Presenters: Jorge Beleván & María Teresa Braschi
- Entertainment: "Talento" of Maricielo Effio & Ernesto Pacheco
- Venue: Real Felipe Fortress Convention Center, Callao, Peru
- Broadcaster: Panamericana Televisión
- Entrants: 21
- Placements: 12
- Winner: Cindy Mejía; Lima Region

The Miss Perú 2012/13 pageant was held on June 30, 2012 at the Real Felipe Fortress Convention Center in Callao, Peru.

Due to the restructuring of the contest, Nicole Faverón of Loreto, 1st-Runner Up at Miss Perú 2011 was appointed to participate at Miss Universe 2012, and Giuliana Zevallos, also from Loreto and former Miss Perú 2010 was appointed to participate at Miss World 2012.

The outgoing titleholder, Natalie Vertiz of USA Peru crowned her successor, Cindy Mejia of Lima Region at the end of the event.

The candidates competed for 2 national crowns and the right to compete in 2013 editions of Miss Universe, Miss World, and other selected pageants.

== Placements ==
Final Results	Contestant
Miss Peru Universe 2013	Region Lima - Cindy Mejía
Miss World Perú 2013	Piura - Elba Fahsbender; Callao - Melissa Paredes (Renuncia).
1st Runner-Up	Junín - Kelin Rivera
2nd Runner-Up	La Libertad- Paola Rodríguez Larraín
3rd Runner-Up	Cajamarca - Alexa Cáceres Drago
Top 12	Ucayali - Diana Rengifo; Moquegua - Ana María Sologuren; Amazonas - Jimena Alarcón; Distrito Capital - Samantha Batallanos; Trujillo - Akemi Giura; Loreto - Fabiola Díaz
Resigned	Callao - Melissa Paredes (Resigned)

== Special awards ==
- Best Regional Costume - Ayacucho - Diana Ascoy
- Miss Photogenic - La Libertad- Paola Rodríguez Larraín
- Miss Elegance - Cajamarca - Alexa Cáceres Drago
- Miss Body - Moquegua - Ana María Sologuren
- Best Hair - Ica - Rosángela Espinoza
- Miss Congeniality - Tumbes - Sharinna Vargas
- Most Beautiful Face - La Libertad- Paola Rodríguez Larraín
- Best Smile - Ucayali - Diana Rengifo
- Miss Internet - Junín - Kelin Rivera Kroll
- Miss Talent Show - Trujillo - Akemi Giura

== Delegates ==
- Amazonas - Jimena Alarcón
- Apurímac - Claudia Martínez
- Arequipa - Thais Flores
- Ayacucho - Diana Ascoy
- Cajamarca - Alexa Cáceres Drago
- Callao - Melissa Paredes
- Distrito Capital - Samantha Batallanos
- Ica - Rosángela Espinoza
- Junín - Kelin Rivera Kroll
- La Libertad - Paola Rodríguez Larraín
- Loreto - Fabiola Díaz
- Madre de Dios - Daniela Miranda Escobar
- Moquegua - Ana Sologuren Torres
- Pasco - Pamela Verdi
- Piura - Elba Fahsbender
- Region Lima - Cindy Mejía
- San Martín - Karen Caro López
- Tacna - Claudia Soria
- Trujillo - Akemi Giura
- Tumbes - Sharinna Vargas
- Ucayali - Diana Rengifo
