= Kelin Rivera =

Peruvian businesswoman, model, and beauty queen

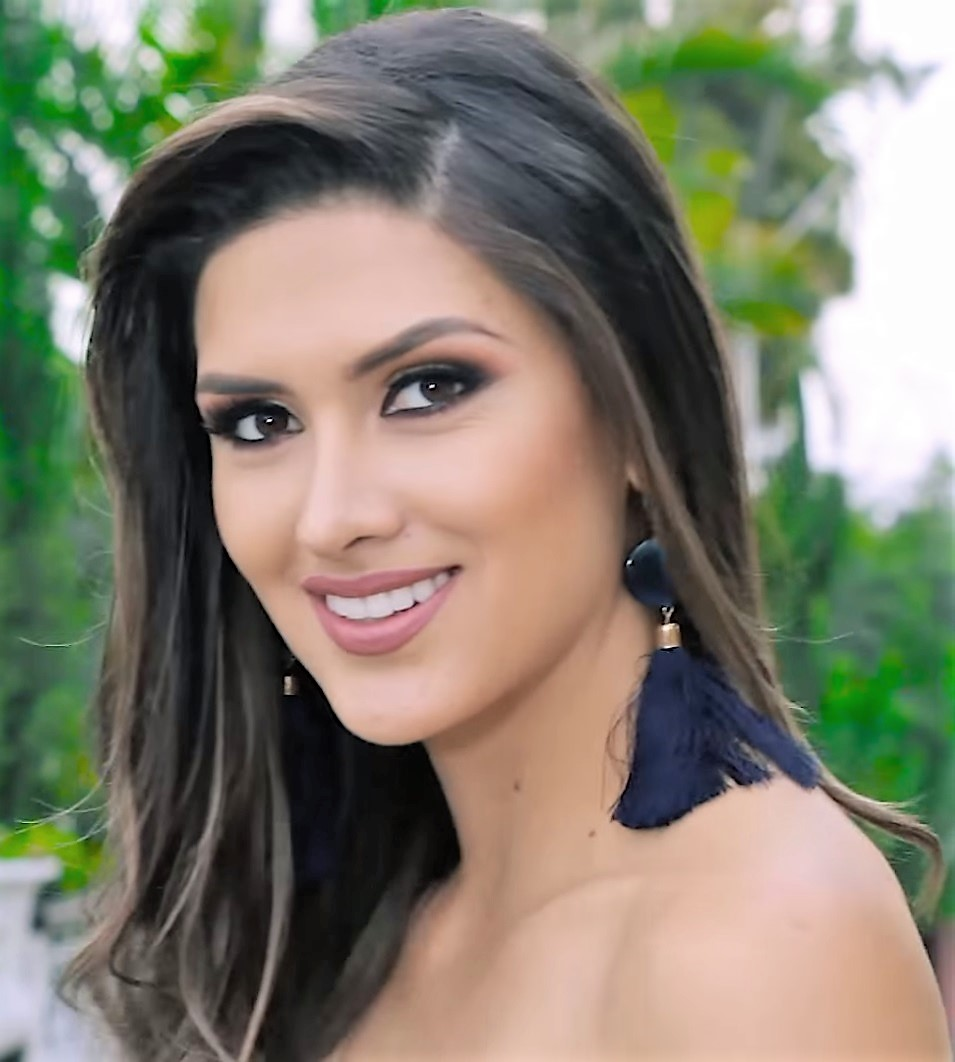
- Rivera in 2018
- Born: Arequipa, Peru
- Education: Universidad San Ignacio de Loyola
- Beauty pageant titleholder
- Title: World Miss University 2016; Miss Eco Peru 2018; Miss Perú 2019; Miss Cosmo Peru
- Major competitions: Miss Peru 2013; (1st Runner-Up); World Miss University 2016; (Winner); Miss Peru 2018; (2nd Runner-Up); Miss Eco International 2018; (2nd Runner-Up); Miss Perú 2019; (Winner); Miss Universe 2019; (Top 10); Miss Cosmo 2025; (Top 21)

Kelin Rivera Kroll is a Peruvian beauty pageant titleholder who won World Miss University 2016 and Miss Perú 2019. She represented Peru at Miss Universe 2019 and reached the Top 10. She also represented Peru in Miss Cosmo 2025, where she placed in the Top 21.

== Early life and education ==
Kelin Rivera Kroll was born in the city of Arequipa. She graduated with a degree in business administration from the Universidad San Ignacio de Loyola.

== Pageantry ==
=== Miss Peru 2013 ===
Rivera's first pageant was at the age of 18, when she competed at Miss Peru 2013 on June 30, 2012. She represented the region of Junín, where she finished as the first runner-up.

=== Miss University World 2016 ===
In 2016, Rivera won World Miss University Peru 2016. She then competed at World Miss University 2016, in Beijing, where she was crowned by the outgoing titleholder, Karina Martin from Mexico. She is the first Peruvian to win the title.

=== Miss Peru 2018 ===
Rivera competed at Miss Peru 2018, representing Arequipa, where she finished as second runner-up. She was appointed Miss Eco International Peru 2018.

=== Miss Eco International 2018 ===
Rivera competed in Miss Eco International 2018, in Cairo, Egypt. At the conclusion of the event, she placed as the second runner-up.

=== Miss Peru 2019 and Miss Universe 2019 ===
Rivera won Miss Perú 2019 on October 20, 2019, representing Arequipa. She then went on to represent Peru at Miss Universe 2019 in Atlanta, Georgia, where she placed in the top 10.

=== Miss Cosmo 2025 ===
Rivera was appointed as Miss Cosmo Peru 2025 and represented Peru at Miss Cosmo 2025 in Vietnam, where she placed in the Top 21. During the competition, Rivera won the Best in Áo dài award.

Awards and achievements
Preceded by (Mexico) Karina Martín	World Miss University; 2016	Succeeded by (Cuba) Claudia Moras
Preceded by Debut	Miss Eco Peru; 2018	Succeeded by Suheyn Cipriani
Preceded by Romina Lozano	Miss Peru; 2019	Succeeded by Janick Maceta
Preceded by Romina Lozano	Miss Cosmo Peru; 2025	Succeeded by Incumbent
