= Angella Escudero =

Peruvian engineer, model, and beauty pageant titleholder

- Born: Angella Belén Escudero San Martín; 29 March 1996 (age 30); Sullana, Piura, Peru
- Education: Antenor Orrego Private University
- Height: 1.63 m (5 ft 4 in)
- Beauty pageant titleholder
- Title: Miss World Peru 2019
- Hair color: Brown
- Eye color: Brown
- Major competitions: Miss World Piura 2019 (Winner); Miss World Peru 2019 (Winner); Miss World 2019 (Unplaced)

Angella Belén Escudero San Martín (born 29 March 1996) is a Peruvian industrial engineer, tv host, model and beauty pageant titleholder who holds the title of Miss World Peru 2019.

== Early life and education ==
Escudero was born in the city of Sullana, Piura, Peru, and was raised in the city of Piura. She began modeling as a teenager and pursued a career in the city of Trujillo. She eventually graduated with a degree in industrial engineering from the Antenor Orrego Private University. While continuing working as a model, she also went on to develop a career as a television host. She participates in events to help children and teenagers living in poor conditions. She's also an environmental advocate in her native country.

== Pageantry ==
Having started modeling as a teenager, Escudero participated in local teen pageants in her native department of Piura. She participated in the Miss World Peru 2019 having won her regional pageant, and went on to win it on August 18, 2019.

She represented Peru at the Miss World 2019 pageant in London, United Kingdom where she did not place as a finalist on the final night.

Awards and achievements
Preceded by Clarisse Uribe	Miss World Peru 2019; 2019	Succeeded by Incumbent
