= Andrea Moberg =

Peruvian model

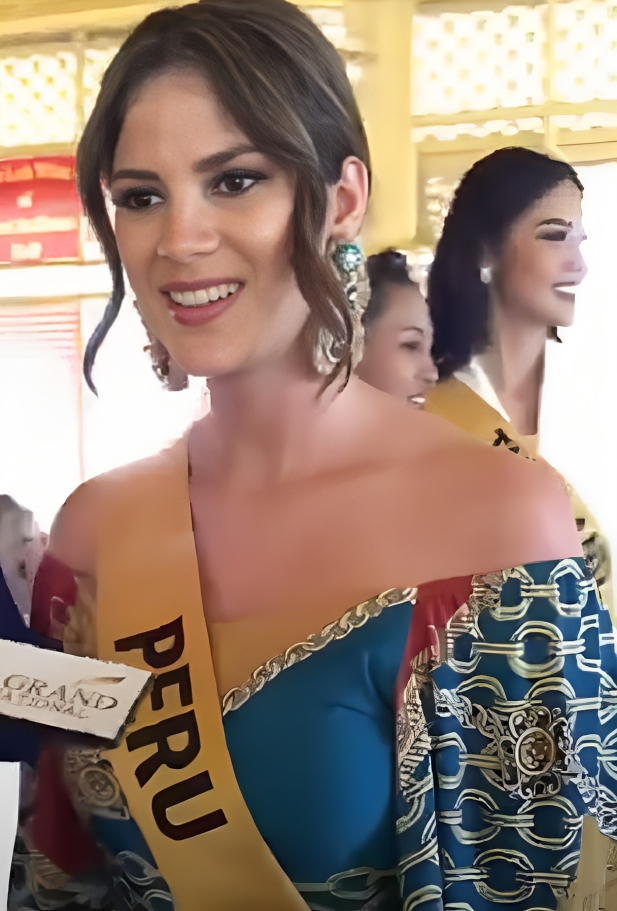
- Born: Andrea Moberg Tobies; Iquitos, Peru
- Occupations: Model; activist; feminist
- Beauty pageant titleholder
- Title: Miss Grand Peru 2018
- Major competitions: Miss Peru Loreto 2018; (Winner); Miss Perú 2018; (1st Runner-up); (Miss Grand Peru); Miss Grand International 2018; (Top 20); (Best National Costume)

Andrea Moberg Tobies is a Peruvian beauty pageant titleholder who won Miss Peru Loreto 2018.

== Pageantry ==
On the night of 29 October 2017, Moberg represented Loreto in the national Miss Peru 2018 contest, which was held at the Municipal Theater of Lima. At the end of the contest, she remained as 1st Finalist, losing to Romina Lozano from Callao and at the same time, she was given the title of Miss Grand Peru 2018 and also as Reina Rosa 2018 by Jessica Newton.

=== Miss Grand Peru 2018 ===
On 6 February 2018, Moberg was officially crowned Miss Grand Peru 2018 by her predecessor María José Lora, Miss Grand International 2017 at the Country Club Hotel in Lima.

== Miss Grand International 2018 ==
Andrea Moberg represented Peru at Miss Grand International 2018 on 25 October 2018 in Rangoon, Myanmar.

Awards and achievements
Preceded by María José Lora	Miss Grand Peru; 2018	Succeeded by Camila Escribens
Preceded by Olenka Arimuya	Miss Peru Loreto; 2018	Succeeded by Lucía Arellano
