= Alessia Rovegno =

Peruvian actress

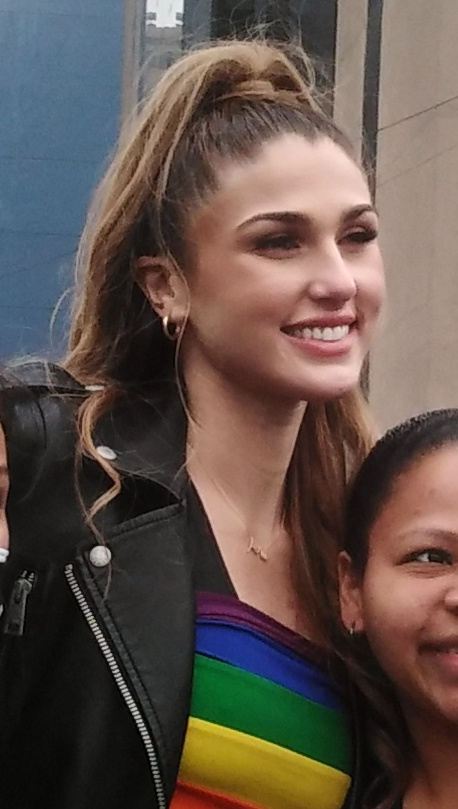
- Rovegno in 2022
- Born: Alessia Rovegno Cayo; Lima, Peru
- Height: 1.80 m (5 ft 11 in)
- Beauty pageant titleholder
- Hair color: Blonde
- Eye color: Green
- Major competitions: Miss Peru 2022; (Winner); Miss Universe 2022; (Top 16)

Alessia Rovegno Cayo is a Peruvian beauty pageant titleholder who was crowned Miss Peru 2022. Rovegno represented Peru at Miss Universe 2022 and reached the Top 16.

== Early life and career ==
She is a member of the Peruvian entertainment Cayo family, that includes her aunt, actress Stephanie Cayo. Her parents are Peruvian actress and singer Barbara Cayo and Lucho Rovegno, who owns a bakery in Lima. She is of Peruvian and Italian descent.

== Personal life ==
As of 12 December 2021, Rovegno is in a relationship with Peruvian athlete Hugo García.

== Pageantry ==
Rovegno entered and won Miss Peru 2022 on 14 June 2022, which was broadcast in the reality show Esto es guerra from América Televisión studios in Lima.

As Miss Peru, Rovegno represented the country at Miss Universe 2022 and competed against 84 other candidates at the Ernest N. Morial Convention Center in New Orleans, Louisiana, United States. She finished as a top 16 semi-finalist. R'Bonney Gabriel of the United States won the pageant.

== Discography ==
- Un amor como el nuestro (2021)
- Nada serio (2022)

Awards and achievements
Preceded by Yely Rivera	Miss Peru; 2022	Succeeded by Camila Escribens
