= Valeria Piazza =

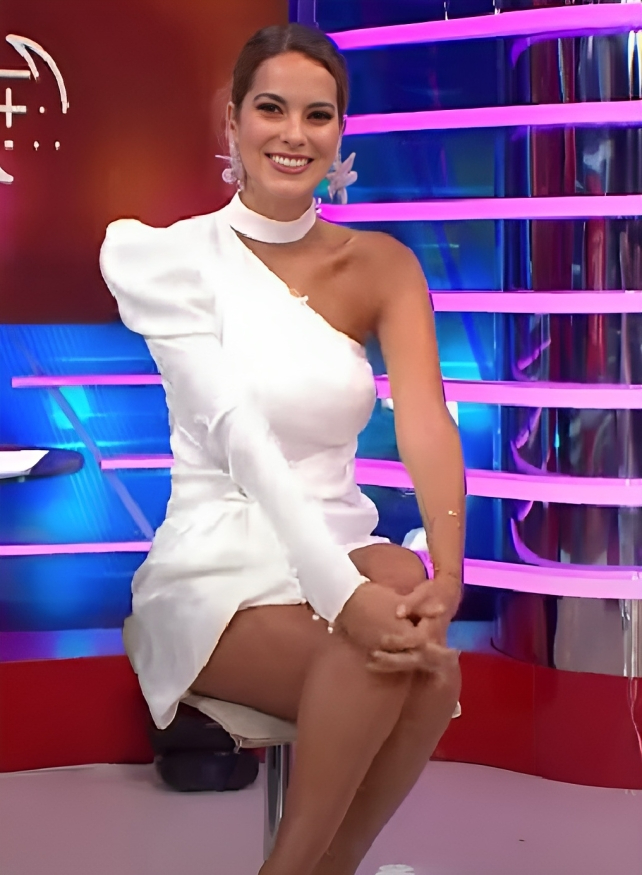
- Piazza as Miss Peru 2016 in América Televisión
- Born: Valeria Piazza Vásquez; 8 December 1989 (age 36); Lima, Peru
- Education: University of Lima
- Height: 1.75 m (5 ft 9 in)
- Beauty pageant titleholder
- Title: Miss Peru 2016
- Hair color: Brown
- Eye color: Brown
- Major competitions: Miss Peru 2016 (Winner); Miss Universe 2016 (Top 13)

Valeria Piazza Vásquez (born 8 December 1989) is a Peruvian social communicator, model, and beauty pageant titleholder who won Miss Peru 2016 and represented Peru at the Miss Universe 2016 pageant, where she was a semifinalist.

== Early life ==
Piazza was born in Lima, the capital city of Peru, on 8 December 1989. She graduated with a degree in communications from the University of Lima. As of 2019, she currently works for Peruvian national broadcaster América Televisión.

== Pageantry ==
Her journey began with modelling from a young age, and that transcended to the international level. She participated in Miss Model of the World 2014, where she finished as a finalist and at Tropic Beauty of the World 2015, where she placed as the 1st Runner-up. Her aforementioned accolades gave her the experience required to participate in larger competitions.

In 2016, Piazza competed at her country's national beauty pageant for the first time. Cited as one of the favourites for the title, she won the national title of Miss Peru 2016 on April 23, 2016. She was crowned by Miss Peru 2015, Laura Spoya and special guest Miss Universe 2015, Pia Wurtzbach of the Philippines.

Piazza represented Peru at the Miss Universe 2016 pageant, where she successfully placed in the Top 13. She became the 18th Peruvian to place in Miss Universe history. She was the first Peruvian to place in the semifinals since Nicole Faverón in 2012 and the first limeña to place as Miss Peru since María Francesca Zaza in 1982.

== Personal life ==
In October 2016, while continuing her social work in Peru and preparing for Miss Universe, Piazza received serious injuries in a car accident after her vehicle was hit by another driver. In January 2018, Piazza was admitted to the intensive care unit in Lima for a life-threatening autoimmune disease she had been born with. She was heavily sedated, and visits were restricted. She eventually made a recovery.

Awards and achievements
| Preceded by Laura Spoya | Miss Peru; 2016 | Succeeded by Prissila Howard |
