= Tatiana Calmell =

Peruvian model and beauty pageant titleholder

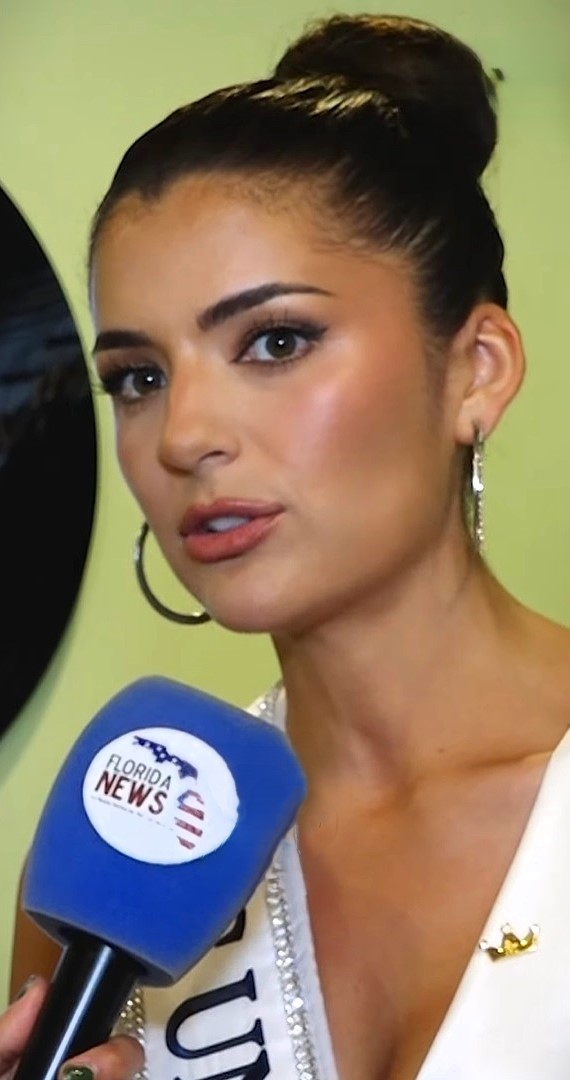
- Calmell in 2024
- Born: Tatiana Andrea Calmell del Solar Ortega; 22 July 1994 (age 32); Breña, Peru
- Education: University of Piura
- Height: 1.75 m (5 ft 9 in)
- Beauty pageant titleholder
- Title: Miss International Peru 2022; Miss Peru 2024; Miss Universe Americas 2024
- Major competitions: Miss Peru 2022; (1st Runner-Up); (Miss International Peru 2022); Miss International 2022; (2nd Runner-Up); Miss Peru 2024; (Winner); Miss Universe 2024; (Top 12); (Miss Universe Americas)

Tatiana Andrea Calmell del Solar Ortega (born 22 July 1994) is a Peruvian model, actress, and beauty pageant titleholder who won Miss Peru 2024. She represented Peru at Miss Universe 2024, and reached the top 12. She received the title of Miss Universe Americas. She was first runner-up at Miss Peru 2022 and represented Peru at Miss International 2022, and was second runner-up.

== Early life and education ==
Tatiana Andrea Calmell del Solar Ortega was born on 22 July 1994 in Breña, Peru and raised in San Miguel. Her father was an aeronautics specialist and former pilot for a major North American airline. From a young age, she was involved in modeling, television commercials, and beauty pageants. She began studying Business Administration at the University of Piura but later shifted to fashion design, after which she returned to professional modeling.

== Career ==
=== Modeling ===
At 14, Calmell began her modeling career by participating in the Elite Model Look competition.

In 2013, she participated in the reality television show Peru's Next Top Model. During the competition, she reported experiencing inappropriate conduct, which affected her performance and led to her elimination.

=== Television and film ===
Calmell's acting debut was in 2020, in the telenovela Princesas (TV series)Princesas, later reprising her role in the second season, renamed Brujas. Calmell had her film debut in 2024 with Bienvenidos al paraíso.

== Pageantry ==
Calmell was first runner-up at Miss Peru 2022. This qualified her to represent Peru at Miss International 2022 in Tokyo. She was second runner-up at Miss International 2022. She crowned her successor Camila Díaz in 2023 as Miss International Peru. At the time, Calmell believed her pageant career had ended due to age eligibility rules. However, during the same event, the Miss Universe Organization officially announced the elimination of its age limit, prompting her to return to competition. Calmell won Miss Peru 2024, representing the province of Talara, and was crowned by her predecessor, Camila Escribens. She represented Peru at Miss Universe 2024 in Mexico City, reaching the top 12 and was awarded the title of Miss Universe Americas.

== Advocacy and platforms ==
Calmell has been involved in various social initiatives and advocacy efforts throughout her career. She participated in campaigns such as Dulces que Cumplen Deseos, organized by the confectionery company La Ibérica in collaboration with Make-A-Wish Peru.

As Miss International Peru 2022, she served as an ambassador for organizations including the Peruvian League to Fight Cancer, Beauties for SDGs, and Corazones Verdes Mundial, supporting outreach efforts across different regions of the country. She took part in the International Forum of Women Entrepreneurs in Japan and developed a project at the Colegio Divino Niño Jesús, an institution offering specialized education and rehabilitation services for children. Motivated by the school's limited resources, she initiated efforts to support its educational programs and encouraged public involvement.

Following her reign, she continued to collaborate with social organizations, becoming an ambassador for the Ronald McDonald House Charities and the Ministry of the Environment of Japan. She launched environmental initiatives including Menos Plástico, Más Vida (Less Plastic, More Life) in partnership with these organizations and the María Reina de la Esperanza School, with which she has maintained long-term involvement.

As Miss Peru 2024, Calmell expressed a commitment to continuing work on social projects, particularly those focused on education and the empowerment of young women in rural communities.

== Personal life ==
She has been in a long-term relationship with Peruvian surfer Cristóbal de Col.

Awards and achievements
Preceded by Inaugural	Miss Universe Americas; 2024	Succeeded by Venezuela, Stephany Abasali
Preceded by Camila Escribens	Miss Peru; 2024	Succeeded by Karla Bacigalupo
Preceded by María José Barbis	Miss International Peru; 2022	Succeeded by Camila Díaz
