= Cindy Mejía =

Peruvian model and beauty pageant

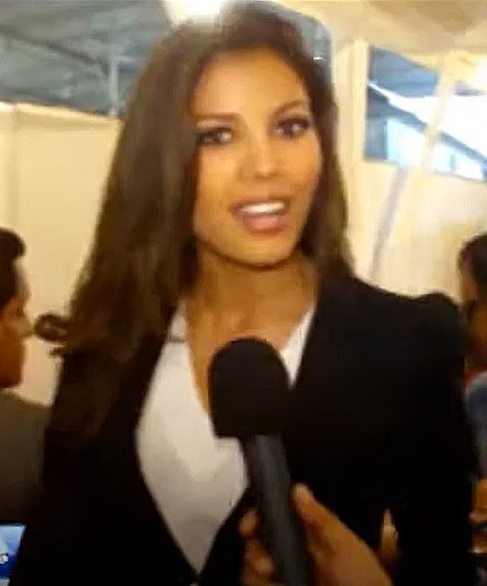
- Mejía in 2012
- Born: Cindy Mejía Santa María; August 30, 1987 (age 39); Lima, Peru
- Height: 1.75 m (5 ft 9 in)
- Beauty pageant titleholder
- Title: Miss Perú 2013
- Major competitions: Miss Perú 2011 (3rd Runner-Up); Reina Hispanoamericana 2011 (Unplaced); Miss Perú 2013 (Winner); Miss Universe 2013 (Unplaced)

Cindy Mejía Santa María (born August 30, 1987, in Lima) is a Peruvian model and beauty pageant titleholder, who won Miss Perú 2013 and represented her country at the Miss Universe 2013 pageant.

== Personal life ==
Cindy was born in Lima and works as a model.

== Pageantry ==
=== Miss Perú 2011 ===
Mejia competed in Miss Peru 2011, earning fifth place. For this position she competed in Reina Hispanoamericana 2011, developed in Santa Cruz de la Sierra, Bolivia. There, she became a model of TV show Bienvenida la tarde, hosted by Laura Huarcayo in Frecuencia Latina.

=== Miss Perú 2012 ===
In June 2012 she competed in Miss Perú, where she earned the title Miss Perú Universo 2013.

=== Miss Universe 2013 ===
Cindy represented Peru at the 62nd annual Miss Universe pageant held on November 9, 2013 in Moscow, Russia. Although considered a favorite, she failed to place in the semifinals.

Awards and achievements
Preceded by Nicole Faverón	Miss Perú; 2013	Succeeded by Jimena Espinoza
Preceded by Sofía Rivera	Miss Continente Americano Peru; 2012	Succeeded by Jimena Espinoza
