= Prissila Howard =

Peruvian model

- Born: Prissila Stephany Howard Neira; September 21, 1991 (age 35); Piura, Peru
- Education: Universidad Peruana de Ciencias Aplicadas
- Occupation: Model • TV Host
- Height: 1.73 m (5 ft 8 in)
- Beauty pageant titleholder
- Title: Miss Teenager Peru 2009; Miss Teen del Pacifico 2010; Miss Grand Peru 2016; Miss Peru 2017
- Years active: 2009–present
- Hair color: Dark Brown
- Eye color: Brown
- Major competitions: Miss Peru 2016 (1st Runner-Up); Miss Grand International 2016 (Top 10); Miss Peru 2017 (Appointed); Miss Universe 2017 (Unplaced)

Prissila Stephany Howard Neira (born 21 September 1991) is a Peruvian model, tv host and beauty pageant titleholder who won Miss Peru 2017 and represented Peru at the Miss Universe 2017 pageant.

== Early life ==
Howard was born in Piura but she grew up in Lima. She studied and graduated in Human Resources and Business Administration in Universidad Peruana de Ciencias Aplicadas.

== Pageantry ==
=== Miss Teenager Peru 2009 ===
In 2009, Howard joined the Miss Teenager Peru 2009 where she was awarded Miss Elegance and Best Runway.

=== Miss Teen del Pacifico 2010 ===
In 2010, Howard won Miss Teen del Pacifico for that year.

=== Miss Peru 2016 ===
Howard placed 1st Runner-up in Miss Peru 2016 while traditionally the 1st Runner-up represented her country at the Miss Grand International 2016 pageant in Westgate Las Vegas Resort & Casino in Las Vegas, Nevada.

=== Miss Grand International 2016 ===
Howard represented Peru at Miss Grand International 2016 in Las Vegas on October 25, 2016, where she finished in the Top 10 semi-finalists.

=== Miss Peru 2017 ===
Howard was announced the winner of Miss Peru 2017 pageant on September 12, 2017, and then competed at Miss Universe 2017.

=== Miss Universe 2017 ===
Howard represented Peru at Miss Universe 2017 but she failed in the Top 16 semifinalists.

== Filmography ==
=== Television ===
- La modelo eres tú (2010)
- Dame que Te Doy (2011)
- Bienvenida la Tarde (2011-2012)
- Esto es Guerra (2013)
- Fábrica de Sueños (2013)

Awards and achievements
Preceded by Alejandra Almonte	Miss Grand Peru; 2016	Succeeded by María José Lora
Preceded by Valeria Piazza	Miss Peru; 2017	Succeeded by Romina Lozano
