= Janick Maceta =

Peruvian model and beauty pageant titleholder (born 1994)

- Born: Janick Alexandra Maceta del Castillo; 9 March 1994 (age 32); Lima, Peru
- Height: 1.77 m (5 ft 9 1/2 in)
- Beauty pageant titleholder
- Title: Miss Tourism World Peru 2018; Miss Peru Supranational 2019; Miss Peru 2020
- Hair color: Brown
- Eye color: Hazel
- Major competitions: Miss Peru 2016 (Top 10); Miss Tourism World 2018 (1st Runner-Up); Miss Perú 2019 (1st Runner-Up); Miss Supranational 2019 (3rd Runner-Up); Miss Perú 2020 (Winner); Miss Universe 2020 (2nd Runner-Up)

Janick Alexandra Maceta del Castillo (born 9 March 1994) is a Peruvian model and beauty pageant titleholder who was crowned Miss Perú 2020. She represented Peru at Miss Universe 2020, where she placed as second runner-up.

She was previously appointed Miss Peru Supranational 2019 and went on to represent Peru at Miss Supranational 2019, finishing as third runner-up. It was the second time a Peruvian contestant achieved this placement, following Claudia Villafuerte in 2010.

== Early life ==
Janick Alexandra Maceta del Castillo was born on 9 March 1994 in Lima, Peru into a middle-class family with roots in Trujillo and Chanchamayo. In an interview with Telemundo, she stated that her mother was an English teacher and her father was a police officer involved in anti-terrorism investigations.

== Career ==
Maceta is the founder of the nonprofit foundation Little Heroes Peru, which supports children who are victims or survivors of sexual violence. She has also promoted a legislative proposal in Peru advocating for the mandatory use of the Gessel chamber in cases involving child sexual abuse. Additionally, she is an audio engineer and co-founder of Top of New York, a record label focused on producing and digitizing music content for emerging artists.

== Pageantry ==
On January 27, 2018, Maceta competed in the Miss Tourism World 2018 pageant, held in Kuala Lumpur, Malaysia, where she finished as first runner-up. She later represented Peru at the Miss Supranational 2019 pageant held on December 6, 2019, in Katowice, Poland, and placed third runner-up.

On November 29, 2020, she was crowned Miss Peru 2020, earning the right to represent Peru at Miss Universe 2020, held on May 16, 2021, in Florida, United States, following a postponement due to the COVID-19 pandemic. Maceta placed second runner-up, marking Peru’s highest placement at the pageant since Gladys Zender won the title in 1957.

Awards and achievements
Preceded by (Mexico) Sofía Aragón	Miss Universe 2nd Runner-Up; 2020	Succeeded by (South Africa) Lalela Mswane
Preceded by (Indonesia) Wilda Octaviana	Miss Supranational 3rd Runner-Up; 2019	Succeeded by (Venezuela) Valentina Sánchez
Preceded by Kelin Rivera	Miss Peru; 2020	Succeeded by Yely Rivera
