= Arlette Rujel =

Peruvian beauty pageant titleholder

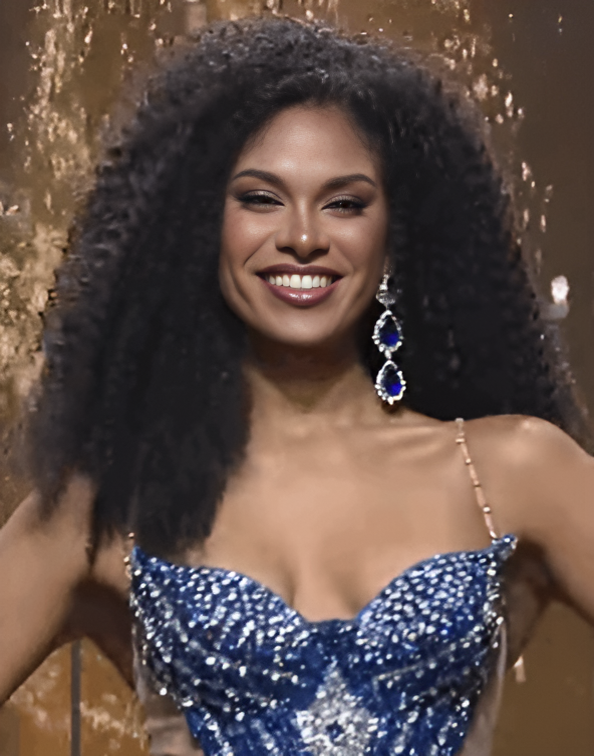
- Rujel in 2024
- Born: Arlette Jatzury Rujel del Solar; Callao, Peru
- Beauty pageant titleholder
- Title: Reina Hispanoamericana Perú 2022; Reina Hispanoamericana 2022; Miss Grand Peru 2024
- Major competitions: Reina Hispanoamericana 2022; (Winner); Miss Grand Peru 2024; (Winner); Miss Grand International 2024; (5th Runner-Up)

Arlette Jatzury Rujel del Solar is a Peruvian beauty pageant titleholder who won Reina Hispanoamericana Perú 2022, and Reina Hispanoamericana 2022.

== Early life and education ==
Arlette Jatzury Rujel del Solar began modelling at the age of 13.

== Pageantry ==
Rujel won Reina Hispanoamericana Perú 2022, on May 28, 2022. Arlette represented Peru and won Reina Hispanoamericana 2022, on March 25, 2023, in the city of Santa Cruz de la Sierra, Bolivia. She competed against 28 other candidates, and was the first Peruvian to win the title. She represented Callao and won Miss Grand Peru 2024, in Punchana. Rujel represented her country and was fifth runner up at Miss Grand International 2024, held in Thailand.

Awards and achievements
Preceded by Andrea Bazarte, Mexico	Reina Hispanoamericana; 2022	Succeeded by Maricielo Gamarra, Peru
Preceded by Eugénia das Neves, Angola; Skarxi Marte, Dominican Republic; Ritassya Wellgreat, Indonesia; Melissa Bottema, Netherlands; Thaweeporn Phingchamrat, Thailand	Miss Grand Peru; 2024	Succeeded by Flavia López
