= Miss Perú 1990 =

- Date: April 1, 1990
- Presenters: Humberto Martínez Morosini
- Venue: Teatro Municipal
- Broadcaster: Global Televisión
- Entrants: 20
- Winner: Marisol Martínez; Arequipa

The Miss Perú 1990 pageant was held on April 1, 1990. That year, 20 candidates were competing for the 2 national crowns. The chosen winner represented Peru at the Miss Universe 1990 and Miss World 1990.The rest of the finalists would enter in different pageants.

== Placements ==
Final Results	Contestant
Miss Peru Universe 1990	Arequipa - Marisol Martínez
Miss World Peru 1990	(United States) USA Perú - Gisselle Martínez Cuadros
Miss PeruAsia Pacifico1st Runner-Up	Lambayeque - Patricia Arbulú Barturen
2nd Runner-Up	Amazonas - Patricia Pérez Vallo
3rd Runner-Up	Pasco - Ingrid Vogler
Top 10	Ucayali - Karol Rodríguez; Trujillo - Sofia Chlebowski; San Martín - Patricia Figueroa; Ancash - Alessandra del Solar; Ica - Marisol García Freundt

== Special awards ==
- Best Regional Costume - Cuzco - Katia Márquez
- Miss Photogenic - Trujillo- Sofia Chlebowski
- Miss Elegance - Ancash - Alessandra del Solar
- Miss Body - Piura - Laly Goyzueta
- Best Hair - USA Perú - Gisselle Martínez
- Miss Congeniality - Arequipa - Marisol Martínez
- Most Beautiful Face - Ica - Marisol García Freundt

.

== Delegates ==
- Amazonas - Patricia Pérez Vallo
- Áncash - Alessandra del Solar
- Apurímac - Roxana Saavedra
- Arequipa - Marisol Martínez
- Callao - Eva Álvarez
- Cuzco - Katia Márquez
- Ica - Marisol García Freundt
- Junín - Olga Schuller
- La Libertad - Sofía Chlebowski
- Lambayeque - Patricia Arbulú Barturen
- Loreto - Jackeline Cacho
- Moquegua - Gabriela Calderón
- Pasco - Ingrid Vogler
- Piura - Ursula 'Laly' Goyzueta
- Puno - Liliana Contreras
- Region Lima - Veronica Perez-Godoy
- San Martín - Patricia Figueroa
- Tacna - Alessandra Chávez
- Ucayali - Karol Rodríguez
- USA Peru - Gisselle Martínez Cuadros
