= Elba Fahsbender =

Peruvian model

Elba Mercedes Fahsbender Merino (born 29 December 1991 in Piura) is a Peruvian model and beauty pageant titleholder who was elected Miss Perú World after participating in the event of Miss Peru 2012 to represent Peru in Miss World 2013. In 2014, she was appointed and crowned as Miss Earth Peru 2014. She represented Peru in Miss Earth 2014 pageant in November.
