= Peru's Next Top Model =

- Official Show Logo
- Genre: Reality television
- Created by: Tyra Banks
- Presented by: Valeria De Santis
- Judges: Valeria De Santis (Host); Antonio Borges; Kitty Garces
- Opening theme: Wanna Be On Top? (Sung by Valeria De Santis)
- No. of episodes: 12

Production
- Executive producer: Valeria De Santis
- Running time: 60 mins

Original release
- Network: ATV
- Release: September 7 – November 23, 2013

Peru's Next Top Model is a Peruvian reality television series, based on Tyra Banks' America's Next Top Model. It is the fourth franchise in Latin America after Brazil's Next Top Model, Mexico's Next Top Model, and Colombia's Next Top Model. The first season of the series began to air on ATV on September 7, 2013.

The season 1 was the first and only installment, hosted by Peruvian model Valeria De Santis. The series featured fifteen finalists in its cast. Production lasted a total of three months, and the footage was divided into twelve episodes.

The winner of the competition was 23-year-old Danea Panta from Trujillo. As her prizes, she received a modeling contract with Mega Model Management in Miami, appear on the fashion spreads of Cosas magazine, a $10,000 contract with L'Bel Cosmetics, a $10,000 contract with Moda Falabella, and a $5,000 contract with Pantene Pro-v.

== Judges ==
- Valeria De Santis (Host)
- Antonio Borges
- Kitty Garces

=== Other cast members ===
- Sergio Corvacho

== Contestants ==
Semi-finalists

Contestant	Age	Height	Hometown	Finish	Place
Vanesa Mathey	18	1.72 m (5 ft 7 1/2 in)	Lima	Episode 1	15–14
Nataly Zúñiga	20	1.74 m (5 ft 8 1/2 in)	Cusco	Episode 1	15–14
Samantha Batallanos	19	1.74 m (5 ft 8 1/2 in)	Lima	Episode 1	13

Finalists

Contestant	Age	Height	Hometown	Finish	Place
Mishell Aguilar	22	1.74 m (5 ft 8 1/2 in)	Lima	Episode 2	12
Lorena Dávila	24	1.75 m (5 ft 9 in)	Lima	Episode 3	11 (DQ)
Claudia Narváez	24	1.80 m (5 ft 11 in)	Lima	Episode 3	10
Gianna Natal	22	1.71 m (5 ft 7 1/2 in)	Lima	Episode 5	9
Tatiana Calmell	18	1.73 m (5 ft 8 in)	Lima	Episode 6	8
Molly Tuesta	24	1.69 m (5 ft 6 1/2 in)	La Libertad	Episode 7	7
Sharinna Vargas	21	1.72 m (5 ft 7 1/2 in)	Lima	Episode 8	6
Johana Saavedra	24	1.71 m (5 ft 7 1/2 in)	Pucallpa	Episode 9	5
Samantha 'Sami' Hauge	19	1.73 m (5 ft 8 in)	Lima	Episode 10	4
Laura Cuadros	24	1.72 m (5 ft 7 1/2 in)	Lima	Episode 11	3
Giordana Carrillo	22	1.72 m (5 ft 7 1/2 in)	Lima	Episode 12	2
Danea Panta	23	1.76 m (5 ft 9 1/2 in)	Trujillo	Episode 12	1

- Molly, Samantha, Sami, Sharinna, and Tatiana all previously participated in Elite Model Look Peru 2011.

== Episode summaries ==
=== Episode 1 ===
First aired: September 7, 2013

- First eliminated: Vanesa Mathey & Nataly Zúñiga
- Best photo: Laura Cuadros
- Bottom two: Mishell Aguilar & Samantha Batallanos
- Second eliminated: Samantha Batallanos
- Featured photographer: Lucia Arana
- Production Company : Canica Films
- General Manager Producer: Maria Teresa Benvenuto

=== Episode 2 ===
First aired: September 14, 2013

For the week's challenge, the girls had to create outfits using garments from "Basement". Johana, Danea and Laura excelled, while Lorena, Giordana and Mishell struggled. Giordana's outfit was deemed the worst because the clothes did not match, the outfit was not styled properly and she didn't pull off the oversized pants, while Johana won the challenge, which earned her a S/.3,000 worth shopping spree from Basement, courtesy of Saga Falabella.

Drama occurred in the house between Danea, Molly and Johana when Danea accused Johana of talking about her behind her back and the other girls, particularly Molly, join in the accusation. Molly and Johana fight, leaving Danea guilty for starting it.

For the photo shoot, the girls posed on a platform at Gamarra, rocking over-the-top styling. Most girls were confident in the shoot, while some girls such as Mishell and Danea were tense and worried. Some girls such as Sharinna and Sami struggled with their outfits but still produced good pictures.

At panel, Giordana's photo was praised by the judges. Sharinna was told her picture was bold but not good, but she was congratulated by the judges for correcting herself and for her original hairstyle at panel. Laura was told she was the best and was praised for her originality and pulling off unconventional poses. Mishell was criticized for lack of attitude in panel and not having diversity of poses. Gianna is told she is one of the few with attitude in her face, while the other contenders had the attitude in their body. Sami was praised for not looking at the camera but the judges did not like how her face was hidden in her photo.

Laura won best photo, earning her a laser treatment, while Mishell and Lorena landed in the bottom two for not owning their beauty and making it high fashion. Ultimately, Mishell was eliminated for not having any attitude in panel.

- Best photo: Laura Cuadros
- Bottom two: Lorena Dávila & Mishell Aguilar
- Eliminated: Mishell Aguilar
- Featured photographer: Gustavo Arrué
- Special guests: Rafo Delgado Aparicio, Daniel Rodriquez, Roger Loayza, Magaly Medina

=== Episode 3 ===
First aired: September 21, 2013

- Disqualified: Lorena Dávila
- Best photo: Sami Hauge
- Bottom two: Claudia Narváez & Johana Saavedra
- Eliminated: Claudia Narváez
- Featured photographer: César Guerrero
- Special guests: Vero Momenti, Marco Apolaya, Rafael Delgado Aparicio

=== Episode 4 ===
First aired: September 28, 2013

- Best photo: Laura Cuadros
- Bottom two: Danea Panta & Tatiana Calmell del Solar
- Saved from elimination: Danea Panta
- Featured photographer: Yayo López
- Special guests: Ana María Giulfo, Sitka Semsch

=== Episode 5 ===
First aired: October 5, 2013

- Immune: Sharinna Vargas
- Bottom two: Gianna Natal & Johana Saavedra
- Eliminated: Gianna Natal
- Special guests: Roberto Otoya, Patricia Uehara

=== Episode 6 ===
First aired: October 12, 2013

- Best photo: Giordana Carrillo
- Bottom two: Laura Cuadros & Tatiana Calmell del Solar
- Eliminated: Tatiana Calmell del Solar
- Featured photographer: Lucia Arana
- Special guests: Gerardo Privat, Jimena Mujica

=== Episode 7 ===
First aired: October 19, 2013

- Best photo: Danea Panta
- Bottom two: Molly Tuesta & Sami Hauge
- Eliminated: Molly Tuesta
- Featured photographers: Carlos Rojas, Edward Alba
- Special guests: Gian Piero Díaz, Andrea Llosa

=== Episode 8 ===
First aired: October 26, 2013

- Best photo: Danea Panta
- Bottom two: Laura Cuadros & Sharinna Vargas
- Eliminated: Sharinna Vargas
- Featured photographer: Rafo Iparraguirre
- Special guests: Gerardo Larrea, Antonio Choy-Kay

=== Episode 9 ===
First aired: November 2, 2013

- Best photo: Giordana Carrillo
- Bottom two: Danea Panta & Johana Saavedra
- Eliminated: Johana Saavedra
- Featured photographer: Jacques Ferrand
- Special guests: Andrea Llosa, Sumy Kujon, Ana Maria Guiulfo, Adriana Miro Quesada, Javier Rivero, Noe Bernacelli

=== Episode 10 ===
First aired: November 9, 2013

- Best photo: Giordana Carrillo
- Bottom two: Giordana Carrillo & Sami Hauge
- Eliminated: Sami Hauge
- Special guests: Fiorella Espejo, Percy Céspedez

=== Episode 11 ===
First aired: November 16, 2013

- Best photo: Danea Panta
- Bottom two: Giordana Carrillo & Laura Cuadros
- Eliminated: Laura Cuadros
- Featured photographers: Edward Alva, Jacques Ferrand
- Special guests: Adriana Miro Quesada, Veronica Momenti

=== Episode 12 ===
First aired: November 23, 2013

- Final two: Danea Panta & Giordana Carrillo
- Peru's Next Top Model: Danea Panta
- Featured photographer: Jacques Ferrand
- Special guests: Pepe Corzo

== Summaries ==
Orden	Episodios										
Orden	1	2	3	4	5	6	7	[8]	[9]	[10]	12
1	Charlene	Molly	Loylyn	Loylyn	Laura	Phoebe	Molly	Phoebe	Molly	Loylyn	Loylyn
2	Wyn	Wyn	Samantha	Charlene	Loylyn	Charlene	Loylyn	Charlene	Loylyn	Molly	Samantha Molly
3	Heather	Phoebe	Beatrix	Molly	Molly	Molly	Samantha	Loylyn	Charlene	Samantha	Samantha Molly
4	Molly	Charlene	Laura	Samantha	Phoebe	Loylyn	Erin	Molly	Samantha	Charlene	
5	Loylyn	Heather	Phoebe	Phoebe	Wyn	Wyn	Phoebe	Samantha	Phoebe		
6	Samantha	Loylyn	Erin	Beatrix	Samantha	Erin	Charlene	Erin			
7	Laura	Erin	Heather	Erin	Charlene	Samantha	Wyn				
8	Natasha	Samantha	Charlene	Wyn	Erin	Laura					
9	Erin	Beatrix	Wyn	Laura	Beatrix						
10	Beatrix	Laura	Molly	Heather							
11	Phoebe	Kelsey									
12	Kelsey	Natasha									
13	Aurora										

The contestant that was eliminated from the competition
The contestant that was disqualified from the competition
The contestant that was originally eliminated but was saved
The contestant that was immune from elimination
The contestant won the competition

=== Photo shoot guide ===
- Episode 1 photo shoot: Simplistic full body shots; nude group shot with fabric (casting)
- Episode 2 photo shoot: Goth women channeling high fashion in Gamarra
- Episode 3 photo shoot: Showcasing new looks in 90's clothing
- Episode 4 photo shoot: Gladiator women in La Herradura beach
- Episode 5 video shoot: Runway show in a hangar
- Episode 6 photo shoot: Chandon champagne on a yacht with Antonio Borges in B&W
- Episode 7 photo shoots: Agua Cielo advertisements; topless FinArt jewelry beauty shots covered in paint
- Episode 8 photo shoot: Glamazons in the jungle
- Episode 9 photo shoot: Elongating body in 40's couture
- Episode 10 commercial & photo shoot: Movistar adverts; posing with a boa constrictor
- Episode 11 photo shoots: Horseback riding for Cosas; natural, skincare, and nighttime L'Bel beauty shots
- Episode 12 photo shoots: Futuristic Inca princesses in Machu Picchu; embodying the Holy Virgin

=== Makeovers ===
- Claudia: Shaved in the back, kept long in the front
- Danea: Bob Cut
- Gianna: Dyed Beach Blonde
- Giordana: Treated for damage with extra shine
- Johana: Trimmed
- Laura: Fringes added
- Molly: Trimmed, curled, brown highlights added
- Sami: Bleached Bob
- Sharinna: Straightened
- Tatiana: Beatles inspired cut, dyed jet-black
