= Laura Spoya =

Peruvian model and beauty queen

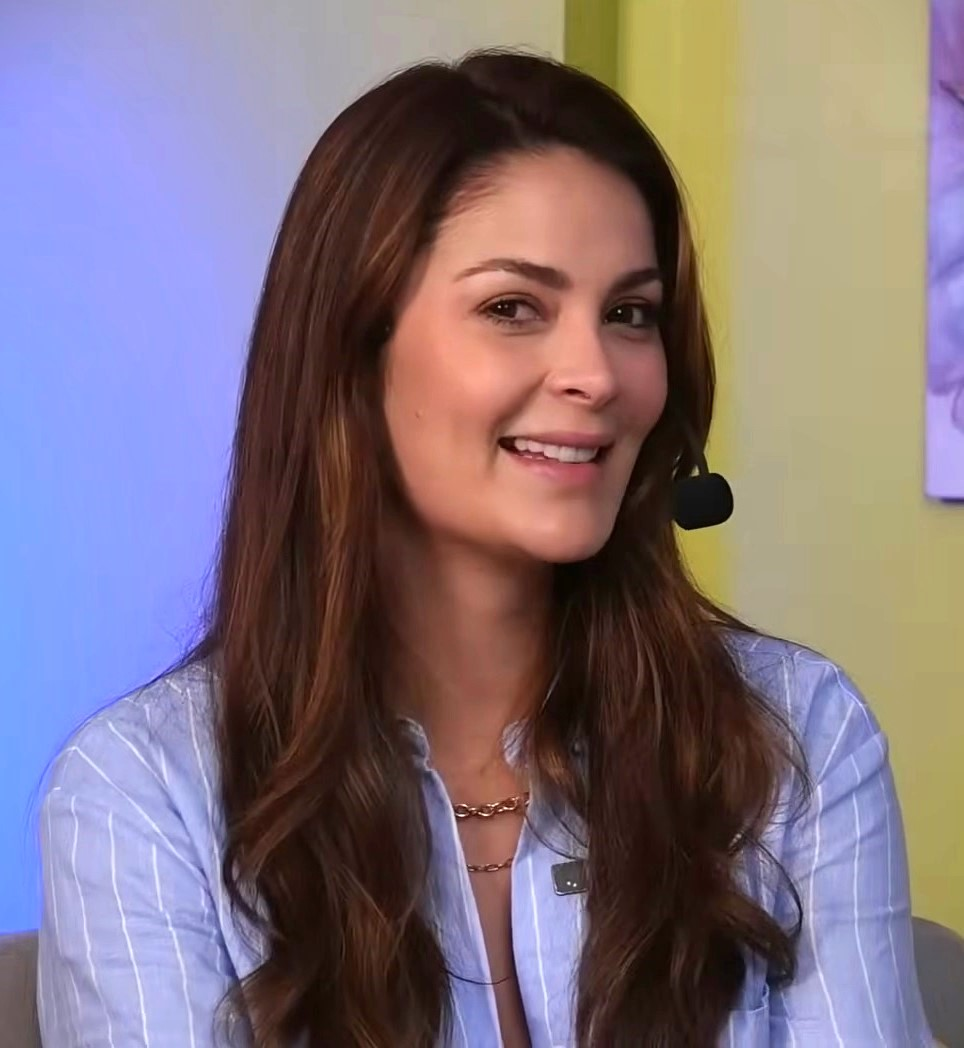
- Spoya in 2024
- Born: Laura Vivian Spoya Solano; July 25, 1991 (age 35); Lima, Peru
- Education: Universidad Peruana de Ciencias Aplicadas
- Height: 1.76 m (5 ft 9 1/2 in)
- Beauty pageant titleholder
- Title: Señorita Lima 2010; Miss International Peru 2010; Miss Peru 2015; Miss Latin America 2016
- Hair color: Light Brown
- Eye color: Brown
- Major competitions: Señorita Lima 2010 (Winner); Miss International Peru 2010 (Winner); Miss International 2010 (Top 15); Reina Mundial del Banano 2010 (1st Runner-Up); Miss Peru 2015 (Winner); Miss Universe 2015 (Unplaced); Miss Latin America 2016 (Winner)

Laura Vivian Spoya Solano (born July 25, 1991) is a Peruvian TV host, model and beauty pageant titleholder who won her home country's beauty national title of Miss Peru 2015. She represented Peru at the Miss Universe 2015 pageant.

== Personal life ==
Spoya was born and raised in the Peruvian capital. She won the Miss International Peru 2010 pageant on April 24, 2010. She represented Peru in the 2010 Miss International pageant that was held in Chengdu, China in October 2010, where she placed among Top 15 semifinalists at the age of 18. Later that year, she competed in the Reina Mundial del Banano 2010 pageant in Machala, Ecuador. She placed again, and ended up finishing 1st runner-up with the title of "Virreina Mundial del Banano." She is of Croatian descent.

=== Miss Peru 2015 ===
Spoya was crowned Miss Peru 2015 at the finals of the country's national pageant held on June 2, 2015, at the Belmond Miraflores Park Hotel located in her hometown of Lima. By winning this title, she earned the right on to represent her home nation of Peru at Miss Universe 2015, held on December 20, 2015 in Las Vegas, Nevada, United States. She went unplaced in the competition despite being cited as one of the favorites for the title.

=== Miss Latin America 2016 ===
Laura Spoya was crowned in Mexico on September 22 to October 1, 2016. To participate in the beauty contest, Laura Spoya put a temporary pause in her career in Mexico as an actress and model sports reporter to return to proudly carry the Peruvian band in the Riviera Maya.

Spoya made the top 10 together with representatives of El Salvador, Mexico, Guatemala, US America, Costa Rica, Panama, Brazil, Belize and Argentina. Then the top 5 were the delegates from Peru, Guatemala, Belize, Brazil and US Latina.

Awards and achievements
Preceded by Jimena Espinoza	Miss Peru; 2015	Succeeded by Valeria Piazza
