= Miss Peru 2015 =

- Date: June 2, 2015
- Presenters: Joselito Carrera, Maria Julia Mantilla & Jessica Newton
- Venue: Belmond Miraflores Park
- Broadcaster: América Televisión
- Entrants: 43
- Placements: 20
- Winner: Laura Spoya; Distrito Capital

The final of the Miss Perú 2015 pageant was held on the night June 2, 2015 at the Belmond Miraflores Park Hotel. It was the first year under the new Miss Peru Organization, marking the comeback of Jessica Newton as national director. The first cut to a Top 20 was chosen on May 2, in a press conference. Later on May 14, the second cut to a Top 10 and Special Awards was chosen during a live broadcast by América Televisión and later to a Top 5. On a private ceremony, an eventual Top 3 was decided to participate for the national crown.

The outgoing titleholder, Jimena Espinoza of Region Lima crowned her successor, Laura Spoya of Lima at the end of the event.

Spoya represented Peru at Miss Universe 2015.

The rest of the finalists would enter in different pageants including first runner-up, Lorena Larriviere who competed at Miss Supranational 2018.

The final round of the pageant was not televised, but a recap was shown the following day by Andina de Television.

== Results ==
=== Placements ===
Placement	Contestant
Miss Peru 2015	Distrito Capital – Laura Spoya
1st Runner-Up	Jesús María – Lorena Larriviere
2nd Runner-Up	Australia Peru – Marsi Fernández-Maldonado
Top 5	Surco – Paola Rosenberg; Ica – Luz Mieses Cartagena
Top 10	Junín – Ornella Pesceros; Callao – Claudia Manrique; Pasco – Jessamin Chaparro; Piura – Leonela Alzamora; Ucayali – Kayla Abenzur
Top 20	Region Lima – Yanina Allison; Amazonas – Hanny Portocarrero; La Punta – Isamar Salazar; La Libertad – Estefani Goicochea; Oxapampa – Adriana del Campo; Arequipa – Lisdey Paredes; Chincha – Denisse Martínez; Chiclayo – Paula Andrea Fernández; Lambayeque – Almendra Quiroz; Cajamarca – Leticia Rivera

== Special awards ==
- Best Regional Costume - Ayacucho - Stefani Jurado Sotelo
- Miss Photogenic - Australia Peru - Marsi Fernández-Maldonado
- Miss Elegance - Jesús María - Lorena Larriviere
- Miss Body - Pasco - Jessamin Chaparro
- Best Hair - Surco - Paola Rosenberg
- Miss Congeniality - Ucayali - Kayla Abenzur
- Most Beautiful Face - Australia Peru - Marsi Fernández-Maldonado
- Best Smile - Region Lima - Yanina Allison
- Miss Internet - Distrito Capital - Laura Spoya (by votes of Missologo Peru Forum)

.

== Delegates ==
- Amazonas - Hanny Portocarrero
- Áncash - Almendra Pacheco
- Apurímac - Diana Ibáñez
- Arequipa - Lisdey Paredes
- Australia Peru - Marsi Fernández-Maldonado
- Ayacucho - Stefani Jurado Sotelo
- Cajamarca - Leticia Rivera
- Callao - Claudia Manrique
- Caraz - Alessandra Morey
- Chiclayo - Paula Andrea Fernández
- Chincha - Denisse Martínez
- Chota - Maricielo Mendoza
- Cuzco - María del Carmen García
- Distrito Capital - Laura Spoya
- Huancavelica - Mariel Zuñiga
- Huánuco - Geraldine Aguirre
- Huaral - Brenda Pavia
- Ica - Luz Mieses Cartagena
- Independencia - Melany Arevalo
- Ilabaya - Zully Salazar
- Ite - Allison Arnao
- Jesús María - Lorena Larriviere
- Junín - Ornella Pesceros
- La Libertad - Estefani Goicochea
- La Punta - Isamar Salazar
- Lambayeque - Almendra Quiroz
- Loreto - Olenka Arimuya
- Madre de Dios - Briggitte Gallardo
- Moquegua - Maria Jose Cruz
- Nazca - Diana Aranguren
- Oxapampa - Adriana del Campo
- Pasco - Jessamin Chaparro
- Pisco - Alysson Andía
- Piura - Leonela Alzamora
- Punta Hermosa - Mariana Zumaran
- Region Lima - Yanina Allison
- San Martín - Sally Vásquez
- Surco - Paola Rosenberg
- Tacna - Samanda Caichihua
- Tumán - Joselyn Camacho Agip
- Tumbes - Mayté Fernández
- Ucayali - Kayla Abenzur
- Urubamba - Grecia Chávez

.

== Judges ==
- Wendy Monteverde - Miss World Peru 1999
- Claudia Jiménez - Fashion Designer
- Karím Chaman - Interior decorator & Owner of Karím Chaman Boutique
- Dr. Ricardo Cruzálegui - Plastic Surgeon
- Luis Miguel Ciccia - Manager of Transportes CIVA
- Carmen Maria Correa - Founder of Kon-Dor bags and accessories
- Ludwing Lobatón - Choreographer & Official Coach of Miss Peru org.
- Dr. Paola Ochoa - Director of Dental Esthetics of Infinity Dental Clinic
- Wendy Wunder - Fashion Designer
- Mariana Larrabure - Miss World Peru 1998
- Viviana Rivas Plata - Miss Peru 2001
- Mónica Ferreira - Runway Coach
- Mónica Chacón - Miss World Peru 1996
- Ana Maria Guiulfo - Fashion Designer
- Marina Mora - Miss World Peru 2001
- Carlos Andrés Luna - Head of Public relations and Partner of Lima Fashion Week
- Renzo Costa - Leather Designer
- Fernando Gomberoff - Manager of Beauty Form
- Norka Peralta del Águila - Peruvian Designer
- Jack Abugattas - Fashion Designer
- Adriana Zubiate - Miss Peru 2002

.
