= Punchana =

- Town
- Location within Peru
- Coordinates: 3°43′S 73°14′W
- Country: Peru
- Region: Loreto
- Province: Maynas
- District: Punchana

Government
  - Type: Democracy
  - Mayor: Jane Donayre Chávez (2019-2022)
- Elevation: 105 m (344 ft)

Population (2017)
  - Total: 78,320
- Time zone: UTC-5 (PET)
  - Summer (DST): UTC-5 (PET)
- Website: www.munipunchana.gob.pe

Punchana is the capital of the Punchana District in the Maynas Province of the Loreto Region in northeastern Peru, in the Peruvian Amazon Jungle. It is a neighborhood on the outskirts of the city of Iquitos, located on the Amazon and the Nanay Rivers. In 2017 it had a population of 78,320.
