= Miss Peru =

Beauty pageant

Miss Perú Organization
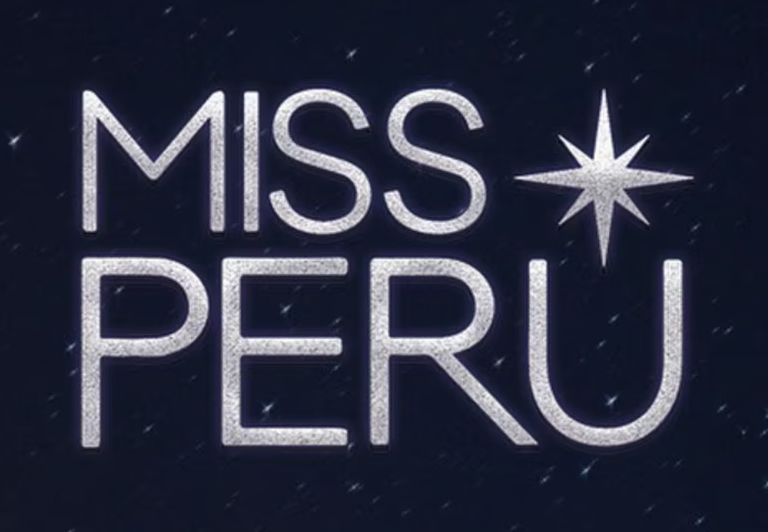
- Formation: June 7, 1952; 74 years ago
- Type: Beauty pageant
- Headquarters: Lima
- Location: Peru
- Members: Miss Universe; Miss International; Miss Earth; Miss and Mister Supranational; Miss Grand International
- Official language: Spanish
- President: Jessica Patricia Newton Vasquez-Saenz
- Parent organization: Grupo D'Elite

Miss Perú is the national beauty pageant of Peru. The contest gathers participants from all over the nation, including Peruvian women representing their community overseas. Having been broadcast by all the major television networks in the country during its history, the pageant is currently broadcast by América Televisión. It is preceded by two or three months of preliminary events, with the awarding of corporate prizes by sponsors.

The winner traditionally represents Peru at the Miss Universe pageant. The remaining finalists have the chance to compete internationally at Miss International, Miss Earth, and Miss Cosmo. The selection process was the same for Miss Grand International until 2023 and Miss Supranational until 2024 with the creation of the separate Miss Grand Peru and Miss Supranational Peru contests that are also part of the same organization.

This national pageant is known for producing Latin America's first ever Miss Universe crown, which was achieved by then 17-year-old Gladys Zender who won the title of Miss Universe 1957.

The owner of the franchise and national director is Miss Peru 1987 and Miss Universe 1987 finalist, Jessica Newton. A separate organization led by Miss Peru 1978 and Miss Universe 1978 finalist, Olga Zumarán, Lizy de las Casas, and Ernesto Paz have the rights of selection for Miss World.

== History ==
Peru has competed in the Miss Universe pageant since 1952 and in the Miss World pageant since 1959. In the Miss Universe pageant, their first representative was Ada Gabriela Bueno, who was crowned as the first Miss Peru in a ceremony at the Lawn Tennis Club of Lima and competed in Miss Universe 1952. Bueno traveled to Long Beach, California to represent her country, but failed to enter the group of semifinalists.

The runner-ups and finalists of the annual Miss Peru and Miss World Peru pageants are sent to compete in other events, such as Miss Supranational, Miss Grand International, Miss Eco International, Reina Hispanoamericana, Miss United Continents, Miss Top Model of the World, Miss Supertalent, Reinado Internacional del Cafe, Reinado Mundial del Banano, Reinado Mundial de la Ganadería, Miss Intercontinental, Miss Globe, Miss Landscapes International, Miss America Latina, Miss Asia Pacific, Miss Tourism Queen International, Miss Bikini International, and Miss Atlantico Internacional, among others.

In the 1950s, Peru was one of the few South American countries that competed in major international competitions such as the Miss Universe and Miss World pageants. The country became consistent joining the group of semifinals five times in the 1950s and four times during the 1960s. Peru is known for having the first Spanish-speaking Miss Universe in 1957, Gladys Zender.

Peru participated in the Miss World pageant for the first time in 1959, represented by María Elena Rossel Zapata, who was ranked as the 1st runner-up. This was the first time that a Latin American country won 2nd place in the Miss World pageant.

In 1967, Peru won the Miss World crown for the first time with Madeline Hartog-Bel, exactly ten years after Gladys Zender won the Miss Universe pageant in 1957, Hartog-Bel had previously participated in Miss Universe 1966, where she placed among the 15 semifinalists.

In 1973, Peru did not send its representative, Mary Núñez Bartra, to the Miss Universe Pageant, because she was prevented from participating by the president of the republic, Juan Velasco Alvarado. He considered the contest was the product of American capitalism, and a country with which he did not have good relations. This was the only occasion in which a Miss Peru did not participate in the Miss Universe except for in 1955 and 1974, when no contest was held. Given the refusal of Alvarado, Bartra was sent to Miss World 1973 in London, England.

In 1982, Peru became the first South American country to host the Miss Universe pageant. Miss Universe 1982 was held in the Coliseo Amauta in Lima on July 26, 1982. The winner was the 18 year old Karen Baldwin from Canada, who became the first representative of her country to win the Miss Universe title. A group of twelve semifinalists were chosen from a total of 77 candidates, representatives from the many countries and territories that competed in this version of the contest. This was the sixteenth consecutive spirited contest for the American television presenter Bob Barker. The show was broadcast via satellite by the U.S. network CBS in collaboration with Panamericana Televisión. In this edition, Peru was represented by Francesca Zaza, who was among the 12 semifinalists and won the prize for Best National Costume.

In 1987, Jessica Newton was chosen to represent the country in Miss Universe 1987 in Singapore. The winner of this edition was the Chilean Cecilia Bolocco. Newton was among the 10 semifinalists. Years later Newton took the franchise of the Miss Peru pageant and was responsible for organizing the event and preparing Peruvian queens for the Miss Universe and Miss World for 12 years.

After many years in 1996, Peru reappeared in the contest with Natali Sacco, who entered in the top 10 in Miss Universe 1996, and in 1998, Mariana Larrabure also entered the top 10 in Miss World 1998. Four years later, in 2002, Marina Mora joined the Top 5, winning third place in the Miss World 2002 pageant. The following year Claudia Ortiz de Zevallos placed in the Top 15 in Miss Universe 2003 and took the second place prize for Best National Costume, and Claudia Hernández placed in the top 20 in Miss World 2003 and won the award for Best Evening Gown. This was so far the only time that Peru had classified the same year in the Miss Universe and Miss World.

In terms of Miss Universe, since the new millennium, Peru came back to the final round of the competition when Claudia Ortiz de Zevallos was a semifinalist in the Miss Universe 2003 pageant held in Panama, then also joined the group of semifinalists in the Miss Earth 2003 pageant. Liesel Holler failed to reach the semifinals in 2004, but like her predecessor also joined the group of semifinalists in the Miss Earth 2004 pageant. Débora Sulca made Peru's comeback in the contest in 2005, placing in the Top 10 and finishing 6th overall (Peru's highest placement to date since winning the crown in 1957).

At Miss World, Peru featured a successful streak of three placements that ended with its second title. Marina Mora finished as 2nd runner-up in the 2002 edition and her successor Claudia Hernandez placed in the Top 20 in 2003. In 2004, Peru returned to international glory in the field of beauty pageants in December 2004, when María Julia Mantilla won the Miss World title thanks to a worldwide vote through text messages and phone calls, which occurred for the first time in the history of the event. She won the crown of Miss World 2004. The first runner-up was Claudia Cruz, from the Dominican Republic, and the second runner-up was Nancy Randall, from the United States.

In 2012, Nicole Faverón made Peru's return to the Miss Universe pageant after seven years of absence by placing at Miss Universe 2012.

Valeria Piazza became the 18th Peruvian to place in Miss Universe history, by making the Top 13 at Miss Universe 2016.

Peru gained its fourth international crown with the title of Miss Grand International 2017, won by Maria Jose Lora. The country returned to the placement circle of Miss World after a 13-year drought when Pamela Sanchez made the Top 40 on the final night.

== Notable winners ==
Peru is one of the 20 countries in the history of pageantry to have won the two most prestigious crowns of Miss Universe and Miss World at least once each.

After winning Latin America's first ever Miss Universe crown, Gladys Zender became very popular and well known in her country. Later she married the politician Antonio Meier and is the mother of the famous Peruvian actor Christian Meier.

Jessica Newton, Miss Peru 1987, after the international contest went to Los Angeles, California where she studied and also worked with Paramount Pictures. Then she worked in Lima editing different magazines. From 1992 to 2004 she was the organizer of the Miss Peru pageant. Since 2007 she has been the representative of Condé Nast, which publishes magazines Vogue, Glamour, GQ and Vanity Fair for Latin America and Mexico. In 2015, she returned to completely take over the national pageant and start a new beginning of the Miss Perú Organization. After an 11-year hiatus, her first Peruvian queens as national director were Laura Spoya and Valeria Piazza.

Carmela Stein, Miss Peru 1961 and Miss Universe 1961 finalist, currently lives in Mexico and is the mother of the famous Mexican actress Ana Patricia Rojo.

Olga Zumaran, who was Miss Peru 1978 and Miss Peru Mundo 1981, began an acting career after her reigns. She was later elected as Mrs. Perú 2009.

Karina Calmet, Miss Peru 1994, became a television presenter and actress. Since 2009 she was part of the Peruvian comedy series Al Fondo Hay Sitio, which ended in 2016.

Frieda Holler, Miss Peru 1965; Carmen Amelia Ampuero, Miss Peru 1972; Mónica Chacón, Miss Peru Mundo 1996; Viviana Rivasplata, Miss Peru 2001; and Marina Mora, Miss Peru Mundo 2002 have had success in the business category and occasionally participate in various television shows.

Like Gladys Zender and Madeline Hartog-Bel, María Julia Mantilla also became a well-known and popular figure in her country. She began working for the Ford Model Agency in London, and then debuted as a businesswoman and a television presenter. She was the host of the variety TV show Al Aire on America Televisión, which ended in 2016 and was planning a new TV project in 2017.

Adriana Zubiate, Miss Peru 2002, was a finalist in Bailando por un sueño in 2008. Claudia Hernández eventually worked as the morning news reporter at Buenos Días, Perù on Panamericana Televisión. Karen Schwarz, Miss Peru 2009, hosted some TV shows in Frecuencia Latina up until the end of 2016 due to expecting her first child.

Natalie Vértiz, Miss Peru 2011; and Nicole Faverón, Miss Peru 2012, took part in the local Peruvian television industry after their reigns. Vertiz currently works as part of the "Espectáculos" section reporter in América Television's news networks. Faverón went on to follow involvement in the clothing business industry, opening a boutique of her own in Lima.

== Other wins ==
There are other international pageants in which Peru has achieved success by winning the title or placing in the semifinals.

Notable wins: Miss Intercontinental 1971, 1987, Mrs. World 1989, 2016, Miss America Latina 1991, 2016, Miss Asia Pacific International 1994, 2001, Reina Internacional del Café 1997, Miss Teenager World 2002, 2007, Miss Caraïbes Hibiscus 2004, 2005, Miss Perla Mundial del Pacifico 2007, Miss Tourism Queen International 2008, Miss Teenager Universe 2008, Miss Beauty International 2009, Miss Continentes Unidos 2010, Reina Internacional de la Ganadería 2015, World Miss University 2016, Reina Mundial del Banano 2016, Miss Supertalent of the World 2016, Miss Grand International 2017, Top Model of the World 2018, Miss Atlantico Internacional 2018, Miss Eco International 2019.

Runner up or semi-final entries: Miss International, Miss Earth, Miss Teen International, Miss Maja Mundial, Reina Hispanoamericana, Miss Italia Nel Mondo, Mrs. Universe, Miss Supranational.

== Titleholders ==
The following women have been crowned Miss Peru:

Year	Miss Perú	Department
1952	Ada Gabriela Bueno Böttger	Apurímac
1953	Mary Ann Sarmiento Hall †	Ucayali
1954	Isabella León Velarde Dancuart	Lima
1956	Rosa Dolores "Lola" Sabogal Morzán	Callao
1957	Gladys Rosa Zender de Meier; Miss Universe 1957	Loreto
1958	Beatriz Boluarte Figueroa	Región Lima
1959	Guadalupe Mariátegui Hawkins	Callao
1960	Medallit Gallino Rey	Lambayeque
1961	Carmela Stein Bedoya	Ayacucho
1962	Silvia Ruth Dedekind Marazzani	Región Lima
1963	Dora Toledano Godier	Loreto
1964	Miluska Vondrak Steel	Loreto
1965	Frieda Holler Figallo	Lima
1966	Madeleine Hartog-Bel Houghton; Miss World 1967	Arequipa
1967	Mirtha Calvo Sommaruga	Callao
1968	María Esther Brambilla	Amazonas
1969	María Julia Mantilla Mayer	La Libertad
1970	Cristina Málaga Butrón	Arequipa
1971	Magnolia Martínez Rojas	Lima
1972	Carmen Amelia Ampuero Mosquetti	Lima
1973	Mary Núñez Bartra	San Martín
1975	Olga Lourdes Berninzon Devéscovi	Región Lima
1976	Rocío Rita Lazcano Mujica †	Junín
1977	María Isabel Frías Zavala	Cajamarca
1978	Olga Roxana Zumarán Burga	Arequipa
1979	Jacqueline Brahms Flechelle	Región Lima
1980	Mariailce Lisseth Ramis Figueroa	Huánuco
1981	Gladys Martina Silva Cancino	Región Lima
1982	María Francesca Zaza Reinoso	Lima
1983	Vivien Griffiths Shields	Lima
1984	Fiorella Ferrari Iglesias	Región Lima
1985	María Gracia Galleno Bedoya	Ucayali
1986	Karin Mercedes Lindermann García	Piura
1987	Jessica Patricia Newton Vasquez-Saenz	Callao
1988	Katia Escudero Lozano	La Libertad
1989	Mariana Sovero McKay	Lima
1990	Marisol Martínez Meza	Arequipa
1991	Eliana Martínez Márquez	Callao
1992	Aline Simone Arce Santos	Arequipa
1993	Déborah de Souza-Peixoto Luna	Lima
1994	Karina Calmet Brugnara	Callao
1995	Paola Dellepiane Gianotti	Amazonas
1996	Natalí Patricia Sacco Ángeles	La Libertad
1997	Claudia María Dopf Scansi	Ancash
1998	Karim del Rosario Bernal Gilardi	Huánuco
1999	Fabiola Mercedes Lazo Bernal	Lima
2000	Verónica Rueckner Rivera	Piura
2001	Viviana Magaly del Rocío Rivasplata Aita	Lambayeque
2002	Adriana Zubiate Flores	Callao
2003	Claudia Ortiz de Zevallos Cano	Arequipa
2004	Liesel Holler Sotomayor	Pasco
2005	Débora Susan Sulca Cravero	Cajamarca
2006	Fiorella Viñas Robles	Lambayeque
2007	María Jimena Elías Roca	Ica
2008	Karol Stephanie Castillo Pinillos †	La Libertad
2009	Karen Susana Schwarz Espinoza	Amazonas
2010	Giuliana Myriam Zevallos Roncagliolo	Loreto
2011	Natalie Diane Vértiz González	USA Perú
2012	Nicole Faverón Vázquez	Loreto
2013	Cindy Paola Mejía Santa María	Región Lima
2014	Jimena Ruminí Espinoza Vecco	Región Lima
2015	Laura Vivian Spoya Solano	Lima
2016	Valeria Piazza Vásquez	Lima
2017	Prissila Stephany Howard Neira	Piura
2018	Romina Lozano Saldaña	Callao
2019	Kelin Poldy Rivera Kroll	Arequipa
2020	Janick Alexandra Maceta del Castillo	USA Perú
2021	Yely Margoth Rivera Kroll	Arequipa
2022	Alessia Rovegno Cayo	Lima
2023	Camila Namie Escribens Castillo	USA Perú
2024	Tatiana Andrea Calmell del Solar Ortega	Piura
2025	Karla Gabriela Bacigalupo Ancieta	USA Perú
2026	TBA	TBA

== International placements ==
The following women have represented Peru in the Big Four beauty pageants, the four major international beauty pageants for women. These are Miss World, Miss Universe, Miss International and Miss Earth.

=== Miss Perú Universo ===
- : Declared as winner
- : Ended as runner-up or top 5/6 qualification
- : Ended as one of the finalists or semifinalists
- : Ended as special awards winner

The winner of Miss Perú represents her country at the Miss Universe. On occasion, when the winner does not qualify (due to age) for either contest, a runner-up is sent.

Year	Department	Miss Perú	Placement at Miss Universe	Special awards
2027	TBA	TBA	TBA	
2026	Ica	Luren Márquez	TBA	
2025	USA Perú	Karla Bacigalupo	Unplaced	
2024	Piura	Tatiana Calmell	Top 12	Miss Universe Americas
2023	USA Perú	Camila Escribens	Top 10	
2022	Lima	Alessia Rovegno	Top 16	
2021	Arequipa	Yely Rivera	Unplaced	
2020	USA Perú	Janick Maceta	2nd Runner-up	Best National Costume (2nd Place)
2019	Arequipa	Kelin Rivera	Top 10	
2018	Callao	Romina Lozano	Unplaced	
2017	Piura	Prissila Howard	Unplaced	
2016	Lima	Valeria Piazza	Top 13	
2015	Lima	Laura Spoya	Unplaced	
2014	Region Lima	Jimena Espinoza	Unplaced	
2013	Region Lima	Cindy Mejía	Unplaced	
2012	Loreto	Nicole Faverón	Top 16	Best National Costume (9th Place)
2011	USA Perú	Natalie Vértiz	Unplaced	
2010	Loreto	Giuliana Zevallos	Unplaced	
2009	Amazonas	Karen Schwarz	Unplaced	
2008	La Libertad	Karol Castillo	Unplaced	Best National Costume (8th Place)
2007	Ica	Jimena Elías	Unplaced	
2006	Lambayeque	Fiorella Viñas	Unplaced	
2005	Cajamarca	Débora Sulca	Top 10	
2004	Pasco	Liesel Holler	Unplaced	
2003	Arequipa	Claudia Ortiz de Zevallos	Top 15	Best National Costume (2nd place)
2002	Callao	Adriana Zubiate	Unplaced	
2001	Lambayeque	Viviana Rivasplata	Unplaced	
2000	Piura	Verónica Rueckner	Unplaced	
1999	Lima	Fabiola Lazo	Unplaced	
1998	Huánuco	Karim Bernal	Unplaced	Best National Costume (2nd Place)
1997	Ancash	Claudia Dopf	Unplaced	Best National Costume (3rd Place)
1996	La Libertad	Natali Sacco	Top 10	
1995	Amazonas	Paola Dellepiane	Unplaced	Best Hairstyle
1994	Callao	Karina Calmet	Unplaced	
1993	Lima	Déborah de Souza	Unplaced	
1992	Arequipa	Aline Arce	Unplaced	
1991	Callao	Eliana Martínez	Unplaced	
1990	Arequipa	Marisol Martínez	Unplaced	
1989	Lima	Mariana Sovero	Unplaced	
1988	La Libertad	Katia Escudero	Unplaced	
1987	Callao	Jessica Newton	Top 10	
1986	Piura	Karin Lindermann	Unplaced	
1985	Ucayali	María Gracia Galleno	Unplaced	
1984	Region Lima	Fiorella Ferrari	Unplaced	
1983	Lima	Vivien Griffiths	Unplaced	
1982	Lima	Francesca Zaza	Top 12	Best National Costume
1981	Region Lima	Gladys Silva	Unplaced	
1980	Huánuco	Lisseth Ramis	Unplaced	
1979	Region Lima	Jacqueline Brahms	Unplaced	
1978	Arequipa	Olga Zumarán	Top 12	
1977	Cajamarca	María Isabel Frías	Unplaced	
1976	Junín	Rocío Lazcano	Unplaced	Best National Costume
1975	Region Lima	Lourdes Berninzon	Unplaced	
1972	Lima	Carmen Ampuero	Top 12	Best National Costume
1971	Lima	Magnolia Martínez	Unplaced	Miss Congeniality
1970	Arequipa	Cristina Málaga	Unplaced	
1969	La Libertad	María Mantilla Mayer	Top 15	Best in Swimsuit (Top 10)
1968	Amazonas	María Esther Brambilla	Unplaced	
1967	Callao	Mirtha Calvo	Unplaced	
1966	Arequipa	Madeleine Hartog-Bel	Top 15	
1965	Lima	Frieda Holler	Top 15	
1964	Loreto	Miluska Vondrak	Unplaced	
1963	Loreto	Dora Toledano	Unplaced	
1962	Region Lima	Silvia Dedekind	Unplaced	
1961	Ayacucho	Carmela Stein	Top 15	
1960	Lambayeque	Medallit Gallino	Unplaced	
1959	Callao	Guadalupe Mariátegui	Unplaced	
1958	Region Lima	Beatriz Boluarte	Top 15	
1957	Loreto	Gladys Zender	Miss Universe 1957	
1956	Callao	Lola Sabogal	Top 15	
1954	Lima	Isabella León	Top 16	
1953	Ucayali	Mary Ann Sarmiento	Top 16	
1952	Apurímac	Ada Gabriela Bueno	Unplaced	

=== Miss Perú Mundo ===
- : Declared as winner
- : Ended as runner-up or top 5/6 qualification
- : Ended as one of the finalists or semifinalists
- : Ended as special awards winner

Ernesto Paz directorship. The 1st runner-up of Miss Peru represented her country at Miss World. In 2006 there was a separate contest called Miss Perú Mundo competition which selected a winner to Miss World. In 2007 there was Miss World Peru under Miss Peru which crowned two winners, Miss Perú and Miss Perú Mundo. From 2010 to 2013 the 1st Runner-up returned to comeback at Miss World. In 2014 the format returned to the 2007 version. Begun in 2015, the Miss Perú Mundo officially named an independent as a national franchise holder in Peru to Miss World.

Year	Department	Miss Perú Mundo	Placement at Miss World	Special awards
2027	TBA	TBA	TBA	
2026	Lima	Josiane Sciotti	Top 20	
2025	Región Lima	Staisy Huamansisa	Unplaced	
2024	No competition held			
2023	Loreto	Lucía Arellano	Top 40	Miss World Sport (2nd Runner-up)
2022	Miss World 2021 was rescheduled to 16 March 2022 due to the COVID-19 pandemic outbreak in Puerto Rico, no edition started in 2022			
2021	Lima	Paula Montes	Unplaced	Miss World Sport (Top 32)
2020	Due to the impact of COVID-19 pandemic, no competition held			
2019	Piura	Angella Escudero	Unplaced	
2018	Ica	Clarisse Uribe	Unplaced	
2017	Amazonas	Pamela Sánchez	Top 40	Head to Head Challenge winner
2016	Lambayeque	Pierina Wong	Unplaced	
2015	La Libertad	Karla Chocano	Unplaced	
2014	Pasco	Sofía Rivera	Unplaced	
2013	Piura	Elba Fahsbender	Unplaced	Miss World Sport (Top 20)
2012	Loreto	Giuliana Zevallos	Unplaced	Best World Dress award (Top 20)
2011	Junín	Odilia García	Unplaced	Beauty with a Purpose (Top 30)
2010	Región Lima	Alexandra Liao	Unplaced	
2009	Cuzco	Claudia Carrasco	Unplaced	
2008	USA Perú	Annmarie Dehainaut	Unplaced	
2007	Tacna	Cynthia Calderón	Unplaced	
2006	La Libertad	Silvia Cornejo	Unplaced	
2005	Tumbes	Fiorella Castellano	Unplaced	
2004	La Libertad	María Julia Mantilla	Miss World 2004	Miss World Sport (2nd Runner-up)
2003	Piura	Claudia Hernández	Top 20	Best World Dress Designer award
2002	La Libertad	Marina Mora	2nd Runner-up	
2001	Lambayeque	Viviana Rivasplata	Unplaced	
2000	La Libertad	Tatiana Angulo	Unplaced	
1999	Cuzco	Wendy Monteverde	Unplaced	
1998	La Libertad	Mariana Larrabure	Top 10	
1997	Amazonas	Claudia Luque	Unplaced	
1996	Loreto	Mónica Chacón	Unplaced	
1995	Amazonas	Paola Dellepiane	Unplaced	
1994	Cuzco	Marcia Pérez	Unplaced	
1993	Callao	Mónika Sáez	Unplaced	
1992	Lima	Ingrid Yrivarren	Unplaced	
1990	USA Perú	Giselle Martínez	Unplaced	
1989	Región Lima	Maritza Zorrilla	Unplaced	
1988	Región Lima	Martha Elena Kaik	Unplaced	
1987	USA Perú	Suzette Woodman	Unplaced	
1986	Lima	Patricia Kuypers	Unplaced	
1985	Lambayeque	Carmen Muro	Unplaced	
1984	La Libertad	Cristina Loayza	Unplaced	
1983	Region Lima	Lisbet Alcázar	Unplaced	
1982	Piura	Cynthia Piedra	Unplaced	
1981	Arequipa	Olga Zumarán	Unplaced	
1980	Cuzco	Roxana Vega	Unplaced	
1979	Lima	Magali Pérez-Godoy	Unplaced	
1978	Región Lima	Karen Noeth	Unplaced	
1977	Cajamarca	María Isabel Frías	Top 15	
1976	Junín	Rocío Lazcano	Unplaced	
1975	Lima	Mary Orfanides	Unplaced	
1973	San Martín	Mary Núñez	Unplaced	
Did not compete between 1969 and 1972
1968	Europe Perú	Ana Rosa Berninzon	Unplaced	
1967	Arequipa	Madeleine Hartog-Bel	Miss World 1967	
1965	Arequipa	Lourdes Cárdenas	Unplaced	
1964	Junín	Gladys Rossana	Unplaced	
1963	Europe Perú	Lucía Buonnani	Unplaced	
1962	Amazonas	Isabel Raschio	Unplaced	
1961	Loreto	Norma González	Unplaced	
1960	Ica	Maricruz Gómez	Unplaced	
1959	Piura	María Elena Rossel	1st Runner-up	

=== Miss Perú International ===
- : Declared as winner
- : Ended as runner-up or top 5/6 qualification
- : Ended as one of the finalists or semifinalists
- : Ended as special awards winner

Year	Department	Miss Perú International	Placement at Miss International	Special awards
2027	TBA	TBA	TBA	
2026	Lima	Valentina Andreón	TBA	
2025	Lima	Nathie Quijano	Top 20	
2024	Ica	Sofia Cajo	Unplaced	Best in Evening Gown
2023	Lima	Camila Díaz	2nd Runner-up	
2022	Piura	Tatiana Calmell	2nd Runner-up	Best in Evening Gown; Miss People's Choice Award
Due to the impact of COVID-19 pandemic, no competition held between 2020―2021
2019	Lambayeque	María José Barbis	Unplaced	Miss International America
2018	Callao	Marelid Medina	Unplaced	
2017	Region Lima	Tiffany López	Unplaced	
2016	La Libertad	Danea Panta	Unplaced	
2015	Piura	Cynthia Toth	Unplaced	Miss Global Blue Award
2014	Callao	Fiorella Peirano	Unplaced	
2013	Tacna	María Gracia Fígueroa	Unplaced	
2012	Amazonas	Rosemary Pizarro	Unplaced	
2011	Moquegua	Alejandra Chávez	Unplaced	
2010	Lima	Laura Spoya	Top 15	
2009	Piura	Alejandra Pezet	Unplaced	
2008	Callao	Massiel Vidal	Unplaced	
2007	La Libertad	Luisa Monteverde	Unplaced	
2006	Junín	Lissy Miranda	Unplaced	
2005	Region Lima	Vanessa López	Top 12	
2004	Cuzco	Aldana García	Unplaced	
Did not compete between 2001 and 2003
2000	Tumbes	Claudia Neyra	Unplaced	
1998	Tacna	Melissa Miranda	Unplaced	
1997	Ancash	Ana Matallana	Top 15	
Did not compete between 1995 and 1996
1994	Amazonas	Lidia Ferrari	Unplaced	
Did not compete between 1989 and 1993
1988	Piura	Susan León	Top 15	
1987	Ancash	Rosario Leguía	Unplaced	
Did not compete between 1968 and 1986
1967	Lima	Martha Quimper	3rd Runner-up	
1966	Lima	Liliana Suarez	Did not compete	
1965	Piura	Lola Muro	Top 15	
1964	Junín	Gladys Reina	Unplaced	
1963	Región Lima	Esperanza Moy	Unplaced	
1962	Amazonas	Isabel Raschio	Unplaced	
1961	Loreto	Norma González	Unplaced	
1960	Lima	Irma Vargas	Unplaced	

=== Miss Perú Earth ===
- : Declared as winner
- : Ended as runner-up or top 5/6 qualification
- : Ended as one of the finalists or semifinalists
- : Ended as special awards winner

Ernesto Paz directorship. Miss Peru organization used to send a delegate to participate in the annual Miss Earth pageant. In 2014, Miss Earth Peru contest was created and in some occasions, delegate from Miss Peru Mundo contest is selected as representative for the Miss Earth pageant.

Year	Department	Miss Earth Perú	Placement at Miss Earth	Special awards
2026	TBA	TBA	TBA	
2025	Huancavelica	Massiel Suárez	Top 25	
2024	Lima	Niva Antezana	Miss Earth Fire (3rd Runner-up)	(gold) Upcycling Fashion Show (Eco group): Vonwelt Nature Farm Ambassador
2023	Piura	Nancy Salazar	Unplaced	
2022	Callao	Gianella Paz	Unplaced	
2021	Region Lima	Briggitte Corrales	Unplaced	
2020	Lima	Kelly Dávila	Unplaced	
2019	Cajamarca	Alexandra Caceres	Unplaced	
2018	Region Lima	Jessica Russo	Unplaced	
2017	San Martin	Karen Rojas	Unplaced	(gold) Best in Long Gown (Group 2)
2016	Piura	Brunella Fossa	Unplaced	
2015	Ucayali	Zully Barrantes	Unplaced	
2014	Piura	Elba Fahsbender	Unplaced	
2013	Piura	Brunella Fossa	Did not compete	
2012	Huancavelica	Miluska Huaroto	Unplaced	
2011	Tacna	Maria Gracia Figueroa	Unplaced	Miss Pagudpud
2010	Ayacucho	Silvana Vasquez	Unplaced	
2009	Cajamarca	Leticia Rivera	Unplaced	
2008	Loreto	Giuliana Zevallos	Unplaced	
2007	Junín	Odilia García	Top 8	Miss Fitness
2006	Ancash	Valerie Neff	Unplaced	
2005	Cusco	Sara Paredes	Unplaced	
2004	Pasco	Liesel Holler	Top 16	
2003	Lima	Danitza Autero	Unplaced	
2002	Arequipa	Claudia Ortiz de Zevallos	Top 10	Best in Evening Gown
2001	Lima	Paola Barreda	Unplaced	

=== Miss Perú Supranational ===
- : Declared as winner
- : Ended as runner-up or top 5/6 qualification
- : Ended as one of the finalists or semifinalists
- : Ended as special awards winner

Year	Department	Miss Perú Supranational	Placement at Miss Supranational	Special awards
2027	TBA	TBA	TBA	
2026	Lima	María Paula Fierro	Unplaced	
2025	Lima	Mayra Messa	Unplaced	
2024	Lima	Nathaly Terrones	Top 25	
2023	Región Lima	Valeria Flórez	Top 12	Miss Supranational Americas
2022	Callao	Almendra Castillo	Top 12	Best National Costume
2021	La Libertad	Solange Hermoza	Top 24	
2020	Due to the impact of COVID-19 pandemic, no competition held			
2019	USA Perú	Janick Maceta	3rd Runner-up	
2018	Piura	Yohana Hidalgo Zeta	Did not compete	
2017	Región Lima	Lesly Reyna	Top 25	
2016	Ayacucho	Silvana Vásquez	Unplaced	
2015	Región Lima	Lorena Larriviere	Unplaced	
2014	La Libertad	Ana María Villalobos	Unplaced	
Did not compete in 2012 and 2013
2011	Ayacucho	Jessica Schialer	Unplaced	
2010	Ucayali	Claudia Villafuerte	3rd Runner-up	
2009	Ancash	Gisella Cava	Top 15	

== See also ==
- Miss Grand Peru
- Mister Peru
