= Claudia Carrasco =

Peruvian actress, TV host, model and beauty pageant titleholder

Claudia Maria Carrasco Sarrio
- Born: Claudia María Carrasco Sarrio; Cusco, Peru
- Height: 1.74 m (5 ft 8 1/2 in)
- Beauty pageant titleholder
- Title: Miss World Peru 2009; Miss Exclusive of the World 2011
- Hair color: Brown
- Eye color: Brown
- Major competition: Miss World 2009 (Unplaced)

Claudia María Carrasco Sarrio (born c. 1988 in Cusco, Peru) is a Peruvian actress, TV host, model and beauty pageant titleholder who was crowned Miss World Peru 2009. She represented Peru in the Miss World 2009 beauty pageant, held on 12 December 2009 in Johannesburg, South Africa, but she was unplaced.

Carrasco, who stands 5' 10" (1.74 m) tall, competed in the national beauty pageant Miss World Peru 2009 on 25 July 2009 and obtained the title at Paseo de Las Aguas in Lima, Peru. She represented the Cusco Region and was crowned by María Julia Mantilla, Miss World Peru 2004 and Miss World 2004. This is the first time that Mantilla crowned another Miss World Peru after being Miss World. Fiorella Castellano, Miss World Peru 2005 was crowned by Marina Mora, Miss World Perú 2002 and Miss World 2002 2nd Runner-Up. This was the first time that a representative from the Cusco Region won the Miss World Peru title.

Claudia Maria as well competed and was crowned on July 16, 2011 as Miss Exclusive of the World 2011, where she was representing her country in the beauty pageant hosted in Turkey.

She is now focusing her career in modeling, acting, and TV&radio hosting in the United States and Europe.

| Preceded by Annmarie Dehainaut | Miss World Peru; 2009 | Succeeded by Alexandra Liao |
