= Liesel Holler =

Peruvian physician, model, and beauty queen

- Born: Liesel Holler Sotomayor; 1980 (age 45–46); Cerro de Pasco, Pasco, Peru
- Education: Umeå University
- Beauty pageant titleholder
- Title: Miss Peru Universe 2004; Miss Earth Peru 2004; Miss Caraibes Hibiscus 2004
- Hair color: Black
- Major competitions: Miss Perú 2004 (Winner); Miss Universe 2004 (Unplaced); Miss Earth 2004 (Top 16); Miss Caraibes Hibiscus 2004 (Winner)

Liesel Holler Sotomayor (born 1980) is a Peruvian doctor, model and beauty pageant titleholder who won the titles of Miss Peru 2004 and Miss Caraibes Hibiscus 2004.

== Pageantry ==
Holler represented the department of Pasco in the Miss Perú 2004 competition on the night of April 19, 2004. She was crowned Miss Peru Universe as a major shock during the final telecast by edging out the main favorite Maria Julia Mantilla who was crowned Miss World Peru 2004 and won the Miss World 2004 pageant in December the same year.

Her surprise national title win gave her the right to represent her country at the Miss Universe 2004 pageant in Quito, Ecuador, where she failed to reach the semifinals.

That same year, Holler was given the opportunity to compete in the Miss Earth 2004 pageant in Quezon City, Philippines, where she placed among the Top 16 finalists. She was Peru's second placement in Miss Earth history. To end the year, she participated in her third and final pageant in the Caribbean island of St. Martin to compete for the title of Miss Caraïbes Hibiscus 2004 where she emerged as the winner after beating the other contestants from Latin America.

Preceded by Claudia Ortiz de Zevallos	Miss Perú; 2004	Succeeded by Débora Sulca
Preceded by Danitza Autero	Miss Earth Peru; 2004	Succeeded by Sara Paredes
Preceded by Renee Sloane-Seale	Miss Caraïbes Hibiscus; 2004	Succeeded by Fiorella Flores
