= Jimena Elías =

Peruvian model

Jimena Elías Roca
- Born: February 1, 1989 (age 37); Peru
- Height: 1.70 m (5 ft 7 in)
- Beauty pageant titleholder
- Title: Miss Teen Peru 2005; Miss Ica; Miss Peru Universo 2007
- Hair color: Brown
- Eye color: Brown
- Major competitions: Miss Teen International 2006 (1st runner-up); Miss Peru Universo 2007 (winner); Miss Universe 2007

Jimena Elías Roca (born February 1, 1989, in Ica, Peru) is a Peruvian model and beauty pageant titleholder who won the Miss Peru Universo 2007.

== Career ==
Elías won the Miss Teen Peru 2005 Pageant and represented Peru in the Miss Teen International pageant and placed as 1st Runner up. She was elected Miss Peru Universo 2007 on April 16, 2007. She was handpicked by the Corporacion Nacional de la Belleza who is in charge of sending their delegate to Miss Universe and other beauty pageants. On May 2, Elías traveled to Mexico City, Mexico, to compete in the Miss Universe 2007 pageant which was held on May 28. She did not place.

Preceded by Fiorella Viñas	Miss Peru; 2007	Succeeded by Karol Castillo †
Preceded by Coriline Neff	Miss Continente Americano Peru; 2007	Succeeded by Karol Castillo †
