= Mister Peru =

Male Beauty contest

- Formation: 1997; 29 years ago
- Type: Male Beauty pageant
- Headquarters: Lima
- Location: Peru
- Members: Manhunt International; Mister World; Mister International; Mister Global; Mister Supranational; Man of the World
- Official language: Spanish
- Leader: Jessica Newton

Mister Peru is the national male beauty pageant. The contest brings together participants from all over the country, including Peruvian men who represent their community abroad.

== History ==
Peru has competed in the Manhunt International pageant since 1997 and in the Mister World pageant since 1998. In the Manhunt pageant, their first representative was Norberto Veloza, who was the first titleholder as Mister Perú

The following men have represented Peru in the major international beauty pageants, the main four being Manhunt International, Mister World, Mister International, Mister Global, Mister Supranational and Man of the World. The owner of the franchise and national director is Miss Peru 1987 and Miss Universe 1987 finalist, Jessica Newton.

== International Placements ==
=== Manhunt Perú International ===
- : Declared as Winner
- : Ended as Runner-up
- : Ended as one of the Semi-finalists

Year	Department	Mister Perú	Placement	Special awards
1997	Lima	Norberto Veloza	Unplaced	
1998	Lima	Martin Parra Casas	Unplaced	
2006	Lima	Richard Chikhani Carrillo	Top 15	
2012	Tacna	Dany Peña Perauna	Unplaced	
2016	Lima	Álvaro Paz-López Montero	Unplaced	
2018	Lima	Pedro Calderón Cosavalente	Unplaced	
2020	Madre de Dios	Alonso Añazgo Bandenay	Unplaced	Mister Physique
2022	Lima	Daniel Jares	Top 10	
2024	Lima	Francisco Dall'Orso Cáceres	Unplaced	Best Swimwear Model
2025	Lima	Aldo Martínez	Top 20	
2026	Lima	Alexander Bastian Fernández	Unplaced	

=== Mister Perú World ===
- : Declared as Winner
- : Ended as Runner-up
- : Ended as one of the Semi-finalists

Year	Department	Mister Perú	Placement	Special awards
1998	Callao	Jean Pierre Vismara	Unplaced	
2010	Lima	Manuel Illich Lobatón	Unplaced	
2012	Lambayeque	Rodrigo Fernandini Chu	Top 10	
2014	Lambayeque	Diego Conroy de la Fuente	Unplaced	
2016	Ica	Alan Massa Caycho	Unplaced	
2019	Lima	Alejandro "Jano" Carper	Unplaced	
2024	Cusco	Mickael Peña Olivieri	Top 20	People's Choice Award

=== Mister Perú International ===
- : Declared as Winner
- : Ended as Runner-up
- : Ended as one of the Semi-finalists

Year	Department	Mister Perú	Placement	Special awards
2013	Lambayeque	Rodrigo Fernandini Chu	Unplaced	
2014	Lima	Bruno Yañez Zelada	Unplaced	
2016	Ucayali	Anddy Flores Campos	Unplaced	
2017	Lima	Juan Manuel Herbert	Unplaced	
2018	Lima	Duilio Vallebuona Reyes	Top 15	People's Choice Award
Due to the impact of COVID-19 pandemic, no competition held between 2019―2021
2022	Lima	Eleazar Moreno Aguayo	Top 15	
2023	Callao	Joel Javier Farach Marquina	Top 10	Most Charisma Men
2024	San Martín	Cristian Novoa Arrué	Unplaced	

=== Mister Perú Global ===
- : Declared as Winner
- : Ended as Runner-up
- : Ended as one of the Semi-finalists

Year	Department	Mister Perú	Placement	Special awards
2015	Lima	Bruno Yáñez Zelada	Top 13	
2016	Lima	Ronald Mayorga Peixoto	Top 16	
2017	Lima	Adrian Zegarra Alvarado	Unplaced	
2018	Lima	Pedro Calderón Cosavalente	Unplaced	
2019	Piura	Miguel Millasaky Arteaga	Unplaced	
2020	Due to the impact of COVID-19 pandemic, no competition held			
2021	Lima	Daniel Jares	Top 17	
2022	Lima	Julio César López Dulanto	Top 15	
2025	Arequipa	Luigi Alberto Morón Safra	Top 20	
2026	Callao	Airton Vargas Veliz	Did not compete	

=== Mister Perú Supranational ===
- : Declared as Winner
- : Ended as Runner-up
- : Ended as one of the Semi-finalists

Year	Department	Mister Perú	Placement	Special awards
2016	Lima	Álvaro Paz-López Montero	Unplaced	
2017	Callao	Franklin Balarezo Ruiz	Unplaced	
2018	Callao	Andrés Alonso Vilchez	Unplaced	
2019	Lima	Alonso Martínez Vivanco	2nd Runner-up	
2020	Due to the impact of COVID-19 pandemic, no competition held			
2021	Lima	Alvaro Vargas Rueckner	Mister Supranational 2021	
2022	Lima	Nicola Roberto Belmont	Top 20	
2023	Lima	Stefano Bermellón	Unplaced	Mister Personality
2024	Callao	Joel Javier Farach Marquina	Top 20	
2025	Lima	Eleazar Moreno Aguayo	Unplaced	
2026	Lima	Jorge Conroy	Unplaced	

=== Man of the World Perú ===
- : Declared as Winner
- : Ended as Runner-up
- : Ended as one of the Semi-finalists

Year	Department	Mister Perú	Placement	Special awards
2018	Lima	Juan Carlos Cabrera Torres	Top 10	
Did not compete between 2019—2025
2026	Lima	Estefano Balarín	Top 10	

== See also ==
- Miss Peru
- Miss Mundo Peru
- Miss Grand Peru
