= Tracy Freundt =

Peruvian model

Tracy Natalia Freundt Bonilla is a Peruvian model born and raised in Lima, Peru.

Her parents are from Ucayali, and her father is a Peruvian citizen of German descent. She currently co-hosts a popular youth-oriented show in Peru called Habacilar.

Freundt participated in the 2005 Miss Peru pageant, where she finished as the first runner-up to the winners, Fiorella Castellano and Debora Sulca, who were later to participate in Miss World and Miss Universe.
