= Madeleine Hartog-Bel =

Peruvian model and beauty queen

Madeleine Hartog-Bell
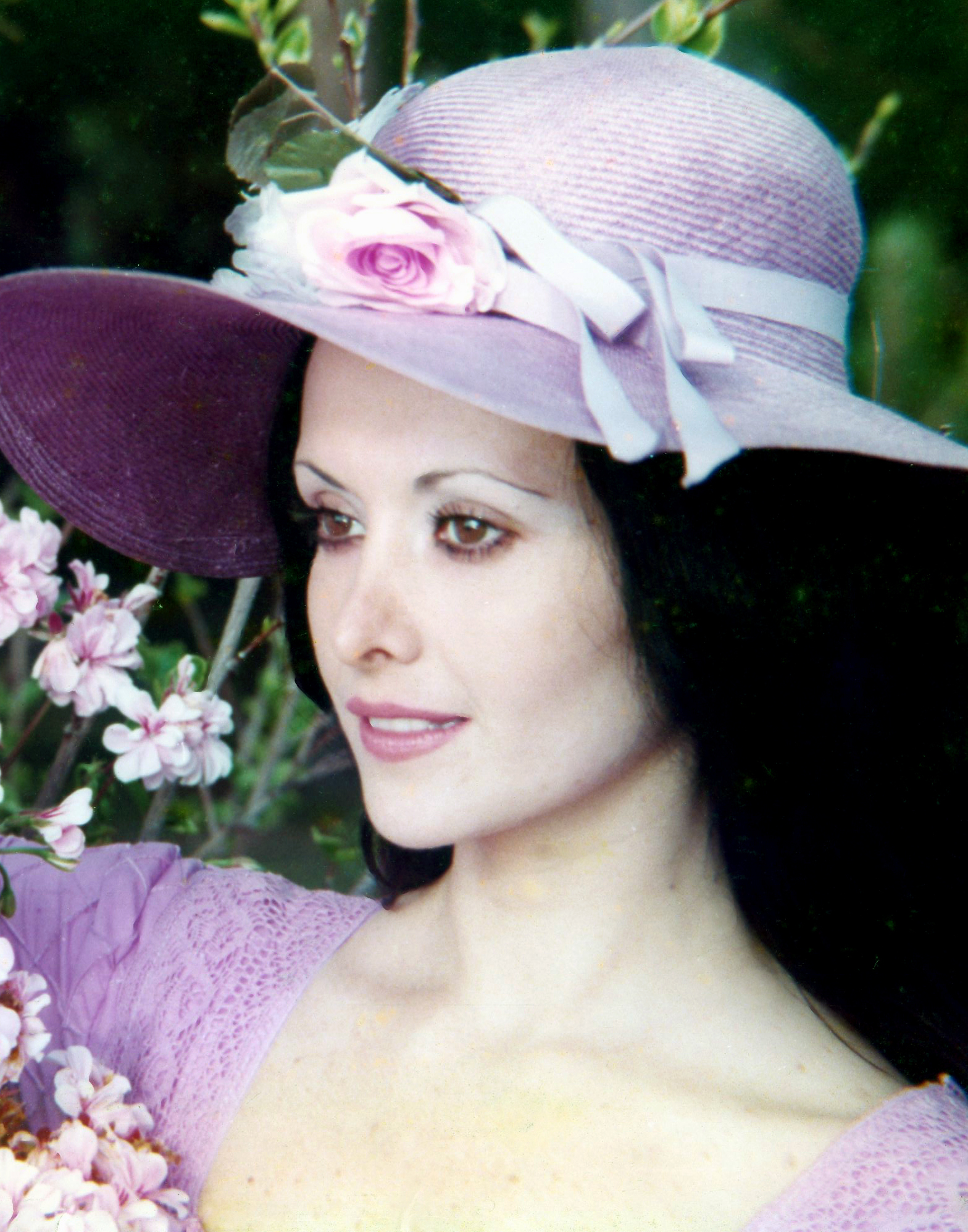
- Madeleine Hartog-Bel in 1975
- Born: Madeleine Hartog-Bel Houghton; June 12, 1946 (age 80); Camaná, Arequipa, Peru
- Height: 1.67 m (5 ft 6 in)
- Beauty pageant titleholder
- Title: Miss Peru 1966; Miss World 1967
- Hair color: Dark brown
- Eye color: Brown
- Major competitions: Miss Peru 1966 (Winner); Miss Universe 1966 (Top 15); Miss World 1967 (Winner)

Madeleine Hartog-Bel Houghton (born June 12, 1947) is a Peruvian model and beauty queen who won the 1967 Miss World contest, representing Peru. After making it to the semi-finals of the Miss Universe pageant in 1966, she went on to win the Miss World title in London, UK the following year. She was the only Peruvian to win the Miss World pageant, until María Julia Mantilla won in 2004.

== Personal life ==
After Miss World, she lived in Paris, France for many years, and now she resides on a South Florida island. She is married and has a daughter. In 1967 she appeared in Bob Hope's Christmas special entertaining the troops in Vietnam.

Awards and achievements
Preceded by (India) Reita Faria	Miss World; 1967	Succeeded by (Australia) Penelope Plummer
