= Miss Perú 2005 =

- Date: April 16, 2005
- Presenters: Laura Huarcayo & Luis Ángel Pinasco
- Venue: Park of the Exposition
- Broadcaster: Panamericana Televisión
- Entrants: 25
- Winner: Débora Sulca Cravero; Cajamarca

The Miss Perú 2005 was held on April 16, 2005. That year, 25 candidates were competing for the national crown. Three winners were chosen to represent Peru at the Miss Universe 2005 pageant which was held in Thailand and the Miss World 2005 pageant, which was held in China, and the Miss Earth 2005.

== Placements ==
Final Results	Contestant	Result International
Miss Peru Universe 2005	Cajamarca - Débora Sulca Cravero	Top 10
Miss World Peru 2005	Tumbes - Fiorella Castellano	I don't classify
Miss Earth Peru 2005	Cuzco - Sara Paredes Valdivia	I don't classify
1st Runner-Up	Ucayali - Tracy Freundt	
2nd Runner-Up	La Libertad - Fiorella Flores	
Top 10	Lambayeque - Vanessa Chanta; Puno - Gabriela Márquez; Amazonas - Diana Goytizolo; Region Lima - Brenda Rodríguez; Piura - Ivette Borrero	

== Special awards ==
- Best Regional Costume - Lambayeque - Vanessa Chanta
- Miss Photogenic - Amazonas - Diana Goytizolo
- Miss Elegance - Ucayali - Tracy Freundt
- Miss Body - Tumbes - Fiorella Castellano
- Best Hair - Cajamarca - Débora Sulca
- Miss Congeniality - Huánuco - Myriam Chacón
- Most Beautiful Face - Amazonas - Diana Goytizolo
- Best Smile - Ica - Fátima Retamozo
- Miss Internet - Ucayali - Tracy Freundt

== Delegates ==
- Amazonas - Diana Audria Goytizolo Do Vilela
- Áncash - Flor de María Aciam Villaroel
- Apurímac - Deborah Dhely Inga Whertens
- Arequipa - Natalia Pozo Olivera
- Ayacucho - Claudia Montoya Haro
- Cajamarca - Débora Sulca Cravero
- Callao - Massiel Vidal Torino
- Cuzco - Sara María Paredes Valdivia
- Huancavelica - Patricia del Castillo Paredes
- Huánuco - Myriam Chacón Tavera
- Ica - Fátima Retamozo Hernandez
- Junín - Giovanna Figallo Hara
- La Libertad - Fiorella Flores Ortega
- Lambayeque - Vanessa Lyisina Chanta Cano
- Loreto - Jennifer Álvarez Vela
- Madre de Dios - Brenda Patricia Añi Stevens
- Moquegua - Verónica Susan Tamashiro Luna
- Pasco - Llubica Zimić Klevatzević
- Piura - Ivette Wendy Borrero Quezada
- Puno - Gabriela Sandra Márquez Ramirez
- Region Lima - Brenda Rodríguez Crawford
- San Martín - Mariana Valencia Sangama
- Tacna - Fiorella Basadre Natal
- Tumbes - Fiorella Castellano Reynosa
- Ucayali - Tracy Freundt

== Background Music ==
- Opening Show – Bananarama - "Venus"
- Swimsuit Competition – Jesse McCartney & Anne Hathaway - "Don't Go Breakin' My Heart"
- Evening Gown Competition – Air Supply - "Every Woman In The World"
- Top 5 - Final Look – Alex Britti, Joe Cocker & Luciano Pavarotti - "You Are So Beautiful"
