= Maita Gomez =

Filipino activist (1947–2012)

- Born: Margarita Favis Gomez; May 23, 1947; Bautista, Pangasinan, Philippines
- Died: July 12, 2012 (aged 65); Quezon City, Philippines
- Resting place: Manila Memorial Park
- Other name: Ka Dolor
- Education: Polytechnic University of the Philippines (BS)
- Occupation: Activist
- Years active: 1967–2012
- Known for: Miss Philippines 1967
- Children: 5

Margarita "Maita" Favis Gomez (May 23, 1947 – July 12, 2012) was a Filipino scholar, activist and beauty pageant titleholder.

In 1967 she won the Miss Philippines–World beauty pageant and went on to represent the country in the Miss World contest. She later became a political, economic, and women's rights advocate, and was active in the Makabayan political movement in the 1980s.

== Early life ==
Maita was born in 1947 to Jose C. Gomez and Cecilia Favis Gomez, and was one of 7 children: Cita; Patty (d. July 11, 2013); Ditas (d. May 16, 2012); Joe; Naty (d. September 11, 2017); and Migui.

== Miss Philippines 1967 ==
She was crowned as Miss Philippines in 1967, and represented the Philippines in Miss World 1967.

== Advocacy work ==
Maita was well known for her political advocacy work. She fought for the liberation of Filipinas and worked hard to fix injustices faced by women. Her advocacy timeline began when she first joined the New People's Army in the 1970s to overthrow the Marcos dictatorship. She got arrested in Baguio in 1973, and escaped prison a few years later thanks to a military asset. She later rejoined the NPA 3 years later and remained until 1980 due to health problems. After resurfacing, she got placed under house arrest until 1984.

After working in the underground, she founded the Metro Manila chapter of GABRIELA, and became the secretary-general of WOMB (Women for the Ouster of Marcos and Boycott). Both were both organized a year after the assassination of Ninoy Aquino. She also became a deputy director for the St. Scholastica’s College's Women Studies Program in 1985, helping in the drafting of its women's studies curriculum. Eventually, Marcos was overthrown in 1986.

== Post-EDSA Revolution ==
After Marcos’ ouster, she went back to school. She finished her BS in Sociology (through the non-traditional mode) at the Polytechnic University of the Philippines in Manila. She also worked as a manager in a private company. Later, she earned her MA in Development Economics at the UP School of Economics, at the University of the Philippines Diliman.

She also co-founded the all-women political party KAIBA (Kababaihan para sa Inang Bayan) in 1986.

Maita was part of the National Council of SELDA (Samahan ng mga Ex-detainee Laban sa Detensyon at pata sa Amnestiya), which pushed for the freedom of political prisoners. She had also worked with other national democratic organizations such as Makabayan and the IBON Foundation. In 2012, she helped form the Women Work Well Foundation, which worked to help women in the Philippines find well-paying jobs. She was also a fellow of Action for Economic Reforms (AER), a think tank focusing on economic and fiscal policies. Her work in AER covered gender economics, and government policies on public-private partnerships and mining.

== Death ==
On July 12, 2012, Maita died at age 65. One of her children found her dead in her home in Quezon City and realized that she had died of a heart attack in her sleep.

== Personal life ==
Maita is survived by her children Melissa Perez-Rubio Ugarte, Jose Luis Decena, Kris and Antares Bartolome, and Michael Phillip Beltran, as well as their children and spouses.

== Legacy ==
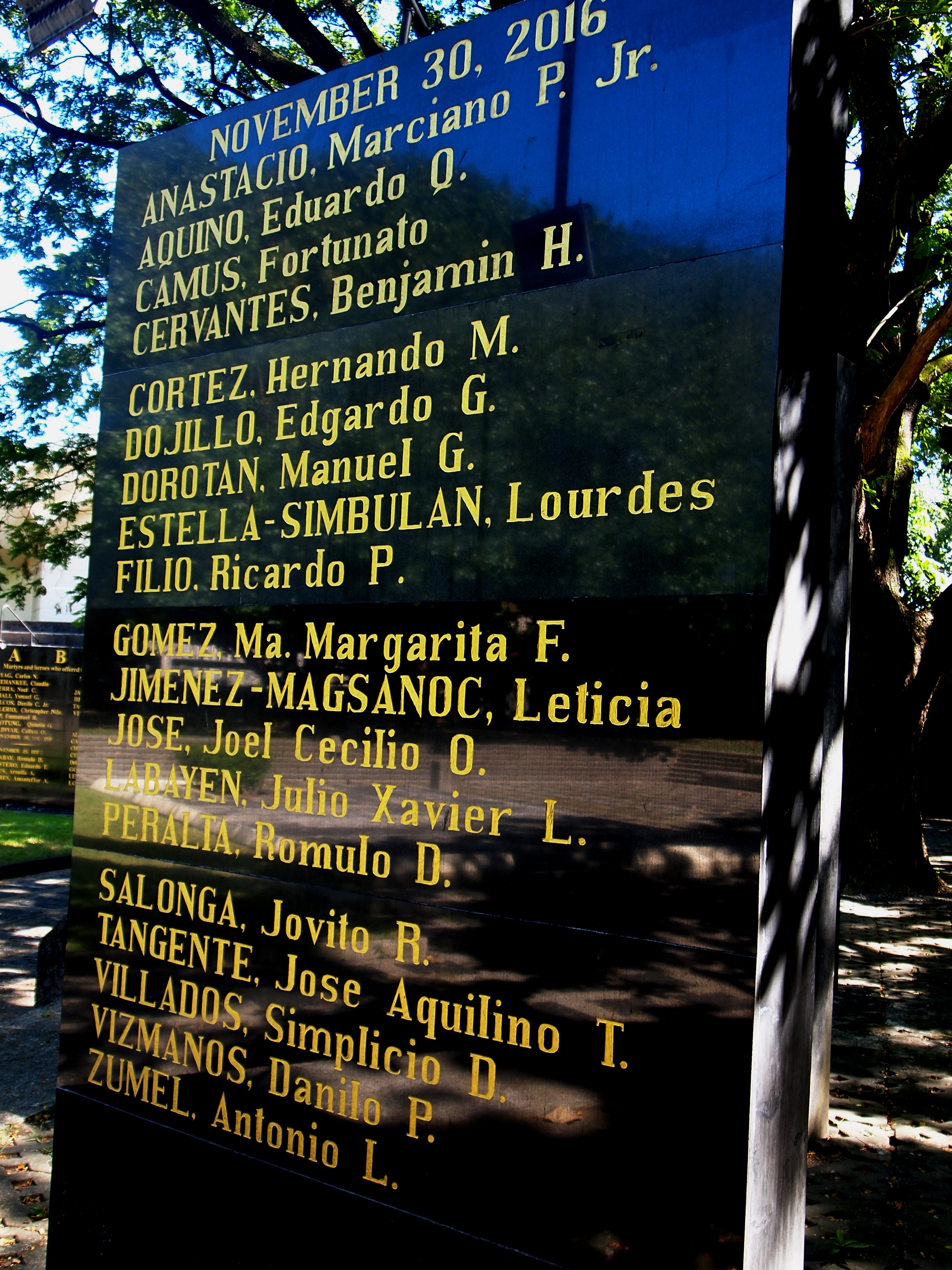
Detail of the Wall of Remembrance at the Bantayog ng mga Bayani, showing names from the 2016 batch of Bantayog Honorees, including that of Maita Gomez.

In recognition of her efforts against Marcos' authoritarian regime, Gomez's name was one of 19 added on November 30, 2016 to the Wall of Remembrance of the Philippines' Bantayog ng mga Bayani (Monument of the Heroes), which is dedicated to individuals who "defied risks and dedicated their life for the cause of truth, justice, peace and freedom for the Filipino people" during the Marcos regime.
