= María Julia Mantilla =

Peruvian beauty queen

María Julia Mantilla Garcia
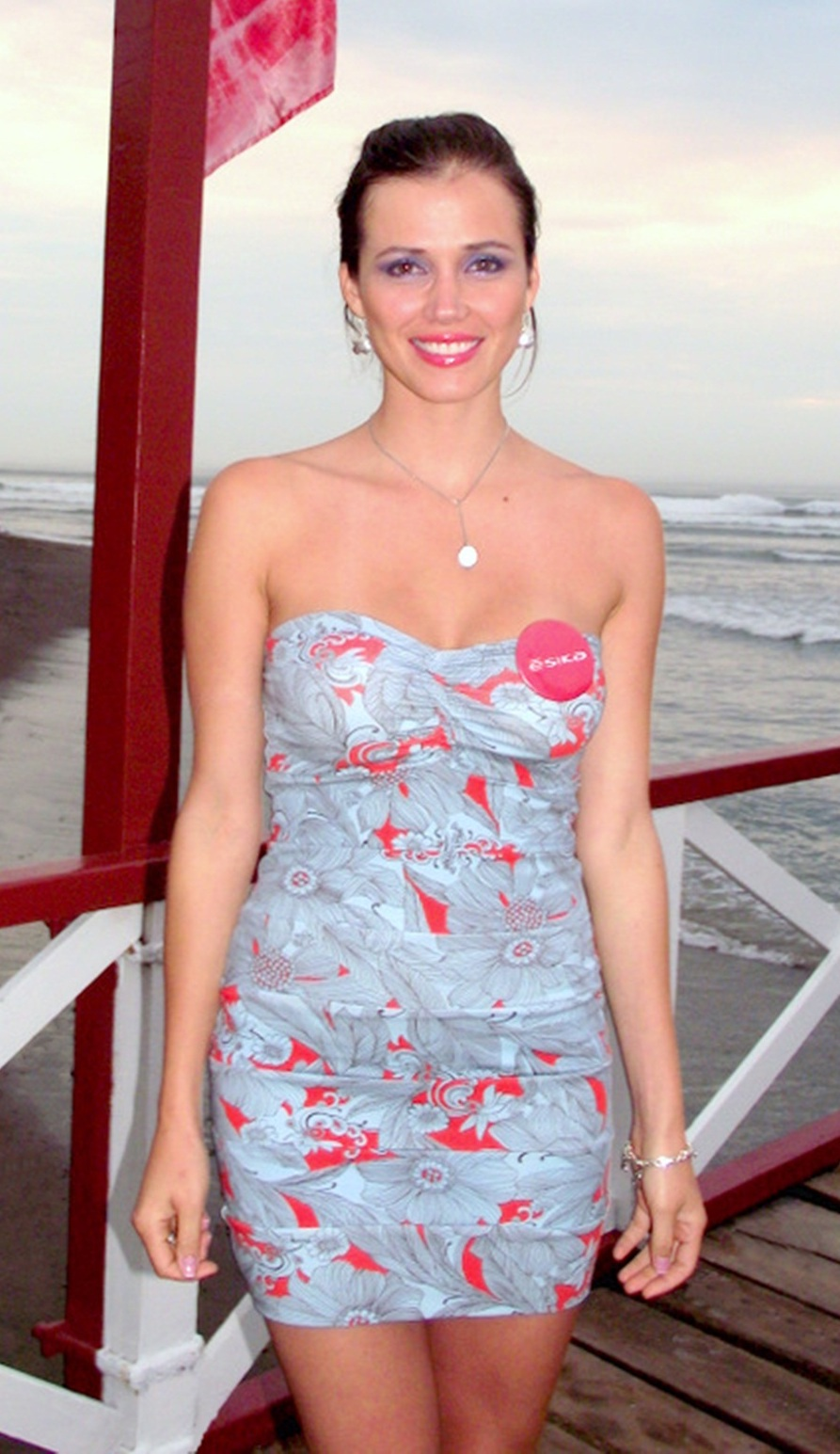
- María Julia Mantilla (2011)
- Born: María Julia Mantilla García; 10 July 1984 (age 42); Trujillo, La Libertad, Peru
- Other name: Maju Mantilla
- Height: 1.74 m (5 ft 9 in)
- Beauty pageant titleholder
- Hair color: Light brown
- Eye color: Hazel
- Major competitions: Miss Perú 2004 (Miss Perú Mundo); Miss World 2004 (Winner)

María Julia "Maju" Mantilla García (born 10 July 1984) is a Peruvian actress, dancer, model, teacher and beauty queen who won Miss World 2004 in China.

== Early life ==
Born in Trujillo, Mantilla is the youngest of the seven sons and two daughters of Olmedo Lucio Mantilla Mayer and Elvia Elizabeth García Linares. She was studying to become a high school teacher and planned to start a second degree in Tourism. One of her dreams was to own an online tourism company to promote her native town and country all over the world. Her city, Trujillo, is a mixture of colonial and pre-Columbian architecture.

In 2001, Mantilla became the Peruvian national champion of Triathlon and Pentathlon, and was elected national athlete of the year. She is a professional dancer in The Marinera, a typical local dance. With a group of ladies, she developed a program in Trujillo to give breakfast to hundreds of children in poor areas. She is a professional dancer.

== Miss Peru ==
In 2004, she was Miss La Libertad and won the right to represent Peru in the Miss World contest and was one of the major favorites in the run-up to the pageant, which was decided by a global television/telephone/online vote. Popularly known in her country as "Maju" Mantilla, her aunt María Julia Mantilla Mayer was Miss Peru 1969.

== Miss World 2004 ==
On 4 December 2004, in the Beauty Crown Theatre located in the Chinese beach city of Sanya, she was crowned Miss World 2004 by the winner from the year before, Rosanna Davison of Ireland, becoming the second winner from Peru since Madeline Hartog-Bel in 1967.

Mantilla was a record breaker for Peru during the competition, and was among the semifinalists in three fast track events. In Miss World Sports, she tied for third place with Kenisha Thom of Trinidad and Tobago. In Miss World Talent, she was among the Top 25 semifinalists with a traditional Peruvian dance, The Marinera Norteña. And finally, in Contestants' Choice, she placed second runner-up.

Claudia Cruz of Dominican Republic and Nancy Randall of the United States were the first and second runners-up, respectively. Other contestants who made it into the final five were 20-year-old Karla Bautista of the Philippines, and 19-year-old Katarzyna Borowicz of Poland.

During her reign, Mantilla performed a variety of duties focused on fundraising for charitable organizations. She traveled to Indonesia, Russia, Peru, United States, Czech Republic, China, Tibet, Ireland, United Kingdom and many other countries during her reign.

On 10 December 2005, she crowned her successor, Unnur Vilhjálmsdóttir of Iceland.

Awards and achievements
Preceded by (Republic of Ireland) Rosanna Davison	Miss World; 2004	Succeeded by (Iceland) Unnur Vilhjálmsdóttir
Preceded by Claudia Hernández	Miss World Peru; 2004	Succeeded by Fiorella Castellano
