= Miss Perú Universo 2008 =

- Date: May 1, 2008
- Presenters: Homero Cristalli & Adriana Quevedo
- Venue: Universidad Privada San Juan Bautista
- Broadcaster: Panamericana Televisión
- Entrants: 16
- Winner: Karol Castillo; Trujillo

The Miss Perú 2008 was held on May 1, 2008. That year, only 16 candidates were competing for the national crown. The chosen winner represented Peru at the Miss Universe 2008 pageant which was held in Vietnam. The Miss Earth Perú would enter in Miss Earth 2008. The first runner up would enter in Miss Continente Americano 2008. The second runner up would in Miss Tourism World 2008.

== Placements ==
Final Results	Contestant
Miss Peru Universe 2008	Trujillo - Karol Castillo †
Miss Earth Peru 2008	Loreto - Giuliana Zevallos
1st Runner-Up	Cuzco - Claudia Carrasco
2nd Runner-Up	Region Lima - Jimena Espinosa Vecco
Top 8	Arequipa - Leslie Bejarano; La Libertad - Giosiana Huby; Tumbes - Raquel García; Lambayeque - Vanessa Chanta

== Special awards ==
- Best Regional Costume - Cuzco - Claudia Carrasco
- Miss Photogenic - Arequipa - Leslie Bejarano
- Miss Elegance - Cuzco - Claudia Carrasco
- Miss Body - USA Perú - Johanna Botta
- Best Hair - Arequipa - Leslie Bejarano
- Miss Congeniality - Ica - Tania Chau
- Most Beautiful Face - La Libertad - Giosiana Huby
- Best Smile - Amazonas - Viviana Guerrero Landa
- Miss Internet - Loreto - Giuliana Zevallos

== Delegates ==
- Amazonas - Viviana Guerrero
- Arequipa - Leslie Bejarano Flores
- Ayacucho - Luciana Higueras
- Chiclayo - María Paola Chirinos
- Cuzco - Claudia Carrasco
- Ica - Tania Chau
- La Libertad - Giosiana Huby Ceasar
- Lambayeque - Vanessa Chanta
- Loreto - Giuliana Zevallos
- Piura - Karla Aguilar
- Region Lima - Jimena Espinosa Vecco
- San Martín - Diana Rodríguez
- Tacna - Angela Ascuna
- Trujillo - Karol Castillo
- Tumbes - Raquel García Aguirre
- USA Perú - Johanna Botta

== Background Music ==
- Opening Show - Bananarama - "Love In The First Degree"
- Swimsuit Competition - Beyoncé & JAY Z - "Crazy In Love"
- Evening Gown Competition – Boyzone - "Love Me For A Reason"
