= Ellen Petri =

Belgian beauty pageant titleholder (born 1982)

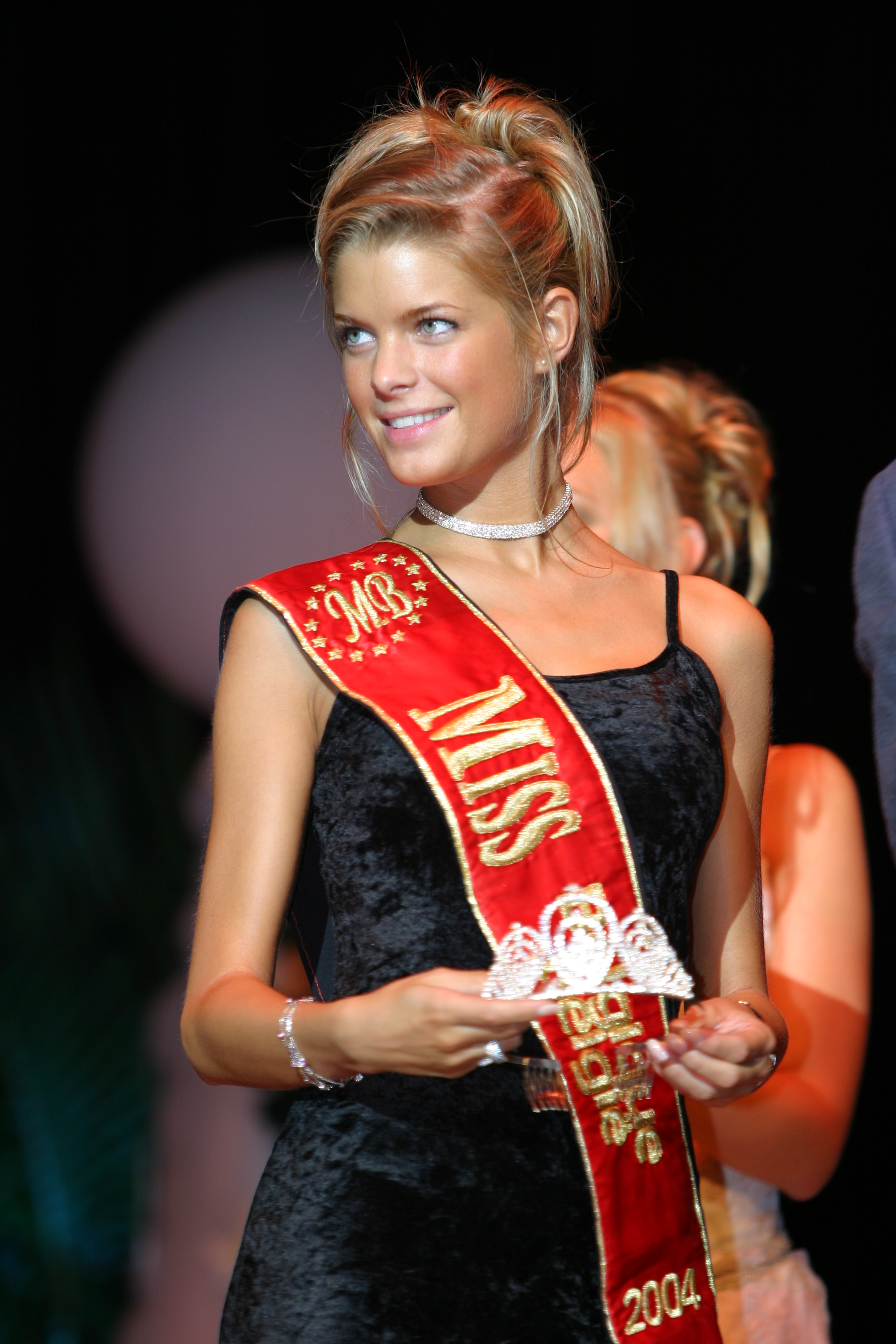
- Ellen Petri in 2004
- Born: 25 May 1982 (age 44); Merksem, Antwerp, Belgium
- Beauty pageant titleholder
- Title: Miss Antwerp 2004; Miss Belgium 2004
- Major competition: Miss Belgium 2004 (winner)

Ellen Petri (born 25 May 1982 in Merksem, Antwerp) is a Belgian beauty pageant titleholder who was crowned Miss Belgium 2004 on 12 December 2003.

== Biography ==
At nine years old, Petri began practising ballet and is employed as a model and choreographer.

In October 2004, she won a 'Sims Award' as the model with the nicest personality. She won the contest 'The Heavenly 100' organized by the Flanders magazine 'Ché' in 2004. She was voted the most beautiful woman on Earth. Second was Beyoncé. She won the 'Top Fashion Designer Award' at the Miss World 2004 pageant. She reached third place in the "World's Top Model" (won by Miss Mexico).

Preceded by Julie Taton	Miss Belgium; 2004	Succeeded by Tatiana Tavares
