= Živa Vadnov =

Slovenian model

Živa Vadnov (born c. 1982) is a Slovenian model and beauty pageant titleholder who was crowned Miss Slovenia 2004 and represented her country at the Miss World 2004 pageant in Sanya, China. She married her longtime partner Klemen on June 25, 2011.
