= Débora Sulca =

Peruvian model (born 1986)

- Born: Débora Susan Sulca Cravero; 17 June 1986 (age 40); Lima, Peru
- Height: 1.80 m (5 ft 11 in)
- Beauty pageant titleholder
- Title: Miss Peru 2005
- Hair color: Brown
- Eye color: Green Medium
- Major competitions: Miss Peru 2005 (Winner); Miss Universe 2005 (Top 10)

Débora Susan Sulca Cravero (born 1986 in Lima, Peru) is a Peruvian model, fashion blogger and beauty pageant titleholder who won Miss Peru 2005 and represented Peru at the Miss Universe 2005 pageant where she was a Top 10 finalist.

== Pageantry ==
At the age of 16, she began her career in modeling and moved to Europe to expand her early career. Three years later she returned to Peru to compete for her country's national beauty pageant by representing the department of Cajamarca. Cited as one of the favorites for the title due to her modeling experience overseas and mature oratory at a young age, she won the Miss Peru 2005 crown on the night of April 16th, 2005. She was the second representative of Cajamarca to win the title since María Isabel Frías in 1977.

The following month, in May, she competed in the Miss Universe 2005 pageant held in Bangkok, Thailand, where she placed among the Top 10 finalists, ranking 6th overall. She became an instant crowd favorite among the thai people during the concentration. Her national costume was inspired in the Lord of Sipan. Sulca's placement was Peru's 16th in the history of the pageant.

Awards and achievements
Preceded by Liesel Holler	Miss Peru; 2005	Succeeded by Fiorella Viñas
