= Miss Perú 1978 =

- Date: June 1, 1978
- Presenters: Jorge Belevan
- Venue: Teatro Municipal (Lima)
- Broadcaster: América Televisión
- Entrants: 24
- Winner: Olga Zumarán; Arequipa

The Miss Perú 1978 pageant was held on June 1, 1978. That year, 24 candidates were competing for the two national crowns. The chosen winners represented Peru at the Miss Universe 1978 and Miss World 1978. The rest of the finalists would enter in different pageants.

== Placements ==
Final Results	Contestant
Miss Peru Universe 1978	Arequipa - Olga Zumarán
Miss World Peru 1978	San Bartolo - Karen Noeth Haupt
Miss Ambar Peru 1978	Europe Perú - Karin Hill Von Gordon
Top 6	Yurimaguas - Cecilia Barboza; Cajamarca - Elizabeth Draguilón; Trujillo - Lidya Solezzi
Top 12	La Punta - Karla Montag; Tacna - Maricarmen de la Guerra; Pisco- Orietta Canales; Punta Hermosa - Ana Zagaceta Silva; Asia Perú - Patty Salvederry; Lambayeque - Rocío Gargurevich

== Special awards ==
- Best Regional Costume - Amazonas - Maiza Ezeta-García
- Miss Photogenic - Trujillo - Lidya Solezzi
- Miss Body - La Punta - Karla Montag
- Best Hair - Europe Perú - Karin Hill Von Gordon
- Miss Congeniality - Yurimaguas - Cecilia Barboza
- Miss Elegance - Lambayeque - Rocío Gargurevich

.

== Delegates ==
- Amazonas - Maiza Ezeta-García
- Arequipa - Olga Zumarán
- Asia Perú - Patty Salvederry
- Barranco - Isabel Casella
- Cajamarca - Elizabeth Draguilón Bonilla
- Callao - Maria Luisa Correa
- Cañete - Connie Pinedo
- Distrito Capital - Mónica Perez-Reyes
- Europe Perú - Karin Von Gordon
- Huanchaco - Maryln Vega
- La Punta - Karla Montag
- Lambayeque - Rocío Gargurevich
- Miraflores - Emily Ugaz
- Oxapampa - Eda Kleeberg
- Pisco - Orietta Canales
- Punta Hermosa - Ana Zagaceta Silva
- Region Lima - Ana María Carrillo
- San Bartolo - Karen Noeth
- San Isidro - Giuliana Forno
- Surco - Cecilia Costa Morán
- Tacna - Maricarmen de la Guerra
- Trujillo - Lidya Solezzi
- USA Perú - Joyce Anderson
- Yurimaguas - Cecilia Barboza
