= Marina Mora =

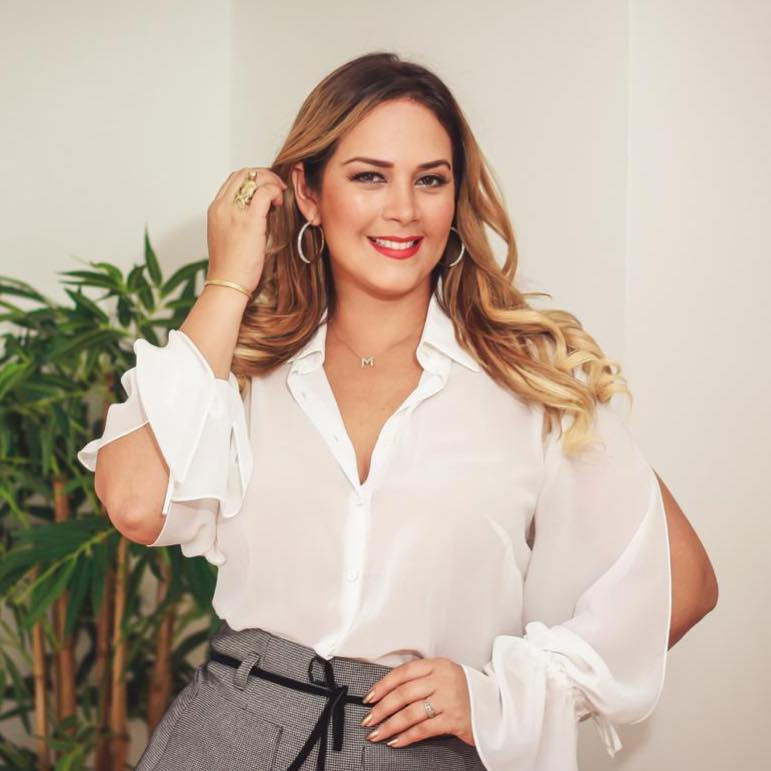
Marina Mora

Marina Mora Montero (born c. 1980) is a Peruvian model and beauty pageant titleholder who as Miss La Libertad, was selected Miss Peru 2002 and represented Peru at Miss World 2002.

In 2016, she was a guest judge in the final Miss Peru 2016 beauty pageant, celebrated in the Ecological Center and Studios of America Television Production, Pachacamac, Lima, Peru.

== Personal life ==
In 2005, Mora married her first cousin, Gustavo Mora. They later separated.

== See also ==
- Miss La Libertad

Awards and achievements
Preceded by (Scotland) Juliet-Jane Horne	2nd Runner-up Miss World; 2002	Succeeded by (China) Guan Qi
