= Claudia Hernández (Peruvian model) =

Peruvian TV host, model and beauty pageant titleholder

Claudia María Hernández Oré (born 1981) is a Peruvian TV host, model and beauty pageant titleholder.

== Life and Career ==
She was born in Lima. She studied Business Administration at the Peruvian University of Applied Sciences and studied Marketing at Universidad San Ignacio de Loyola. She won the Miss Peru Mundo 2003 contest and participated in Reinado Internacional de las Flores 2003 beauty contest where she because the first queen. She was one of the 20 semi-finalists in the Miss World 2003 contest, where she won best gown (Best Dress Designer Award).

In entertainment, she co-hosted a Peruvian television show based on a singing talent-contest format, called Camino a la fama on the ATV Channel. She also co-hosted the 2006 Miss Peru Mundo contest. During the years 2006 to 2009 she worked as a Press TV Host in Panamericana Television for a program called Reportajes. Also in the same period, she co-hosted the press space 24 Horas Sabatino. Hernandez is regarded as one of the TV hosts with most potential to succeed in Perú.

Hernández is also a businesswoman, and owns a Peruvian NGO called Identidad y Valores Perú for the promotion of the Peruvian image abroad. Additionally, she is the owner of Castor Media, an agency of marketing and communications.

== Personal data ==
- Hair: Black
- Eyes: Dark Brown
- Height: 1.73m
