= Miss World 1967 =

17th Miss World pageant

- Madeleine Hartog-Bel
- Date: 16 November 1967
- Presenters: Simon Dee; Michael Aspel
- Venue: Lyceum Ballroom, London, United Kingdom
- Broadcaster: BBC
- Entrants: 55
- Placements: 15
- Debuts: Czechoslovakia; Panama; Uganda
- Withdrawals: Aruba; Bahamas; Jordan; India; Malaysia; Suriname; Syria; Trinidad and Tobago
- Returns: Australia; Austria; Ghana; Kenya; Nigeria; Peru; Portugal; Tanzania; Tunisia
- Winner: Madeleine Hartog-Bel; Peru

Miss World 1967 was the 17th edition of the Miss World pageant, held at the Lyceum Ballroom in London, United Kingdom, on 16 November 1967.

At the conclusion of the competition, Reita Faria of India crowned Madeleine Hartog-Bel of Peru as Miss World 1967. This was Peru's first victory in the history of the competition. María del Carmen Sabaliauskas of Argentina finished as the first runner-up, while Shakira Baksh of Guyana finished as the second runner-up.

Contestants from fifty-five countries and territories participated in the competition. Simon Dee hosted the event, while Michael Aspel provided commentary throughout the competition.

== Background ==
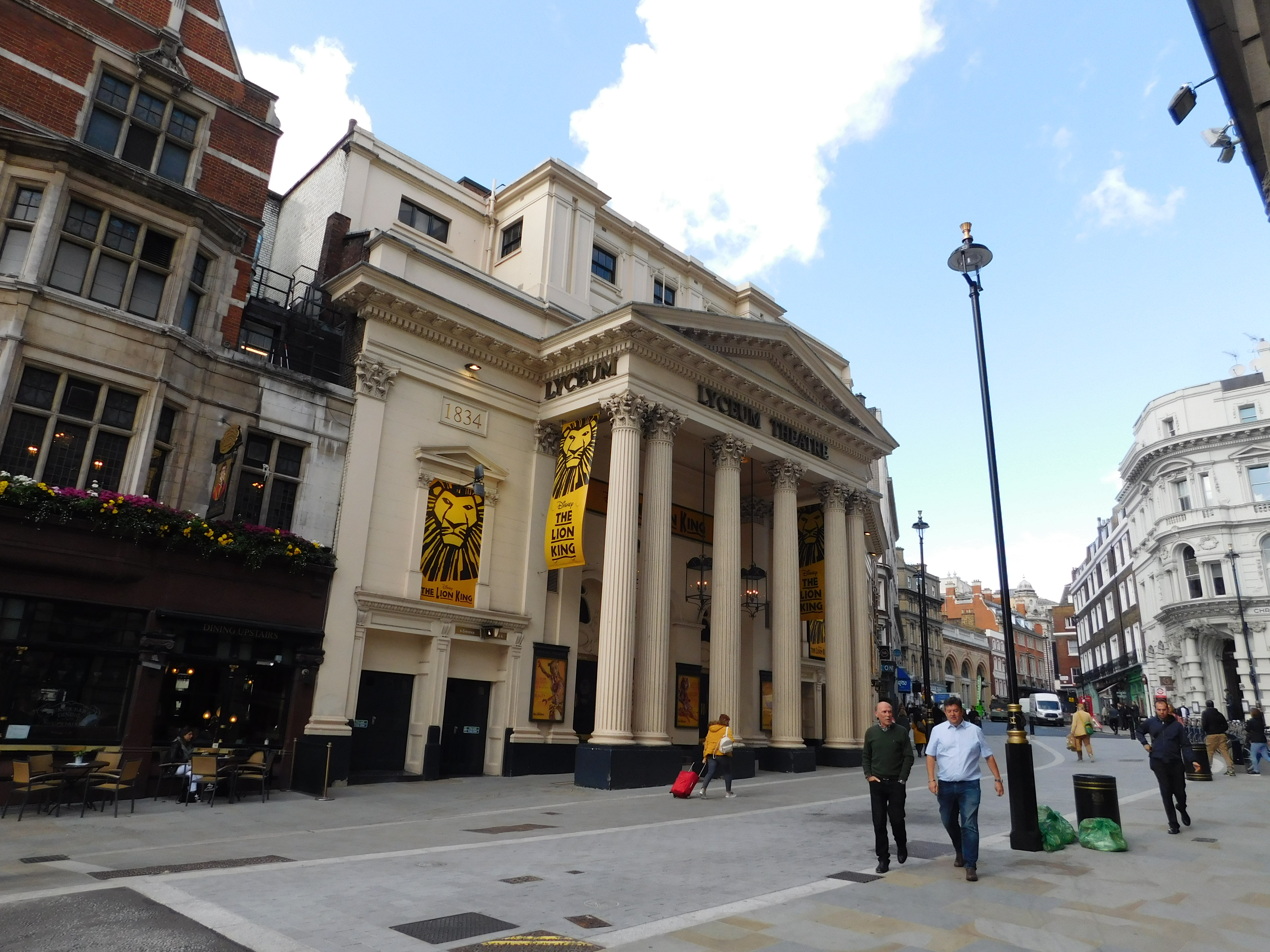
Lyceum Ballroom, the venue of Miss World 1967

=== Contestant selection ===
Contestants from fifty-five countries and territories were selected to participate in the competition. Four contestants were appointed to represent their respective countries or territories after finishing as runners-up in their national pageants or being selected through a casting process, while one contestant was appointed following the withdrawal of the originally selected contestant.

==== Replacements ====
Miss France 1967 Jeanne Beck was originally expected to participate in this edition. However, for undisclosed reasons, she was replaced by Carole Noe, the first runner-up of Miss Cinemonde 1967, as France's representative at Miss World. Since Seedevi Ragama declined to travel to London to represent Ceylon, the Miss World organizers decided to appoint Therese Fernando as her replacement.

==== Debuts, returns, and withdrawals ====
Czechoslovakia, Panama, and Uganda made their debut appearances in the competition. Ghana returned after last competing in 1959; Kenya and Tanganyika (now Tanzania) returned after last competing in 1960; Nigeria in 1963; Portugal in 1964; and Australia, Austria, Peru, and Tunisia in 1965.

Ankie Bruin of Aruba, Rosenelly binti Abu Bakar of Malaysia, Licella Zuiverloon of Suriname, and Patsy Wilson of Trinidad and Tobago did not participate for undisclosed reasons. Miss India 1967, Naqi Jehan Ali, did not participate because the Indian government prohibited her from competing in Miss World due to the actions of Miss World 1966 Reita Faria, such as her visit to South Vietnam to join The Bob Hope Show during the Vietnam War, in which the Indian government maintained a neutral position. The Bahamas, Jordan, and Syria did not participate after their respective national organizations failed to hold national competitions or appoint contestants.

Francisca Delgado of Spain did not participate in protest against the United Kingdom's claim to Gibraltar.

== Results ==
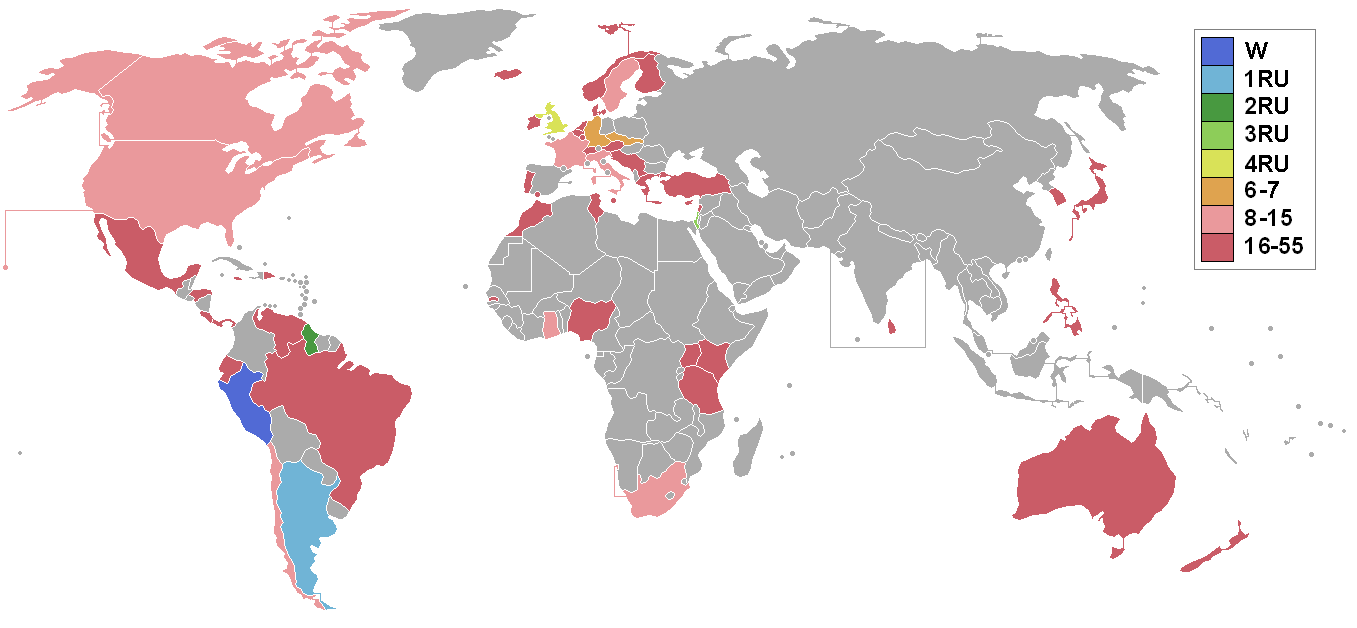
Countries and territories that participated in Miss World 1967 and their respective placements.

=== Placements ===
Placement	Contestant
Miss World 1967	Peru – Madeleine Hartog-Bel
1st runner-up	Argentina – María del Carmen Sabaliauskas
2nd runner-up	Guyana – Shakira Baksh
3rd runner-up	Israel – Dalia Regev
4th runner-up	United Kingdom – Jennifer Lewis
Top 7	Czechoslovakia – Alžbeta Strkulová; Germany – Ruth Köcher
Top 15	Canada – Donna Barker; Chile – Margarita Téllez; France – Carole Noe; Ghana – Araba Martha Vroon; Italy – Tamara Baroni; South Africa – Disa Duivestein; Sweden – Eva Englander; United States – Pamela Valari Pall

== Pageant ==
=== Competition format ===
As in 1961, fifteen semi-finalists were selected through a preliminary competition held on the day of the final, which consisted of a swimsuit competition and an evening gown competition. The fifteen semi-finalists competed in the swimsuit and evening gown competitions, after which seven finalists were selected to advance to the final interview.

=== Selection committee ===
- General Ibrahim Adjie – Indonesian Ambassador to the United Kingdom
- Richard Chamberlain – American actor
- Peter Dimmock – BBC executive
- Maureen O'Hara – Irish-American actress
- Pedro Silva Patiño – Secretary of the Paraguayan Embassy in the United Kingdom
- Henry Thynn – 6th Marquess of Bath
- Lady Worrell – Wife of Jamaican senator Frank Worrell
- Princess Elizabeth of Toro, Uganda

== Contestants ==
Fifty-five contestants competed for the title.

Country/Territory	Contestant	Age (Note: Ages at the time of the pageant)	Hometown
Argentina	María del Carmen Sabaliauskas	20	Rio Cuarto
Australia	Judy Lockey	19	Randwick
Austria	Christl Bartu	21	Bludenz
Belgium	Mauricette Sironval	19	Brussels
Brazil	Wilza de Oliveira Rainato	18	São João da Boa Vista
Canada	Donna Barker	20	Ontario
(Sri Lanka) Ceylon	Therese Fernando	–	London
Chile	Margarita Téllez	17	Santiago
Costa Rica	Marjorie Furniss	17	San Jose
Cyprus	Laila Michaelides	–	Nicosia
Czechoslovakia	Alžbeta Strkulová	22	Košice
Denmark	Sonja Jensen	20	Copenhagen
Dominican Republic	Margarita Rosa Rueckschnat	18	Santo Domingo
Ecuador	Laura Elena Baquero	20	Guayaquil
Finland	Hedy Rannari	21	Helsinki
France	Carole Noe	19	Montfermeil
(The Gambia) Gambia	Janie Jack	21	Banjul
Germany	Ruth Kocher	19	Krefeld
Ghana	Araba Martha Vroon	18	Accra
Gibraltar	Laura Bassadone	–	Gibraltar
Greece	Mimika Niavi	21	Athens
Guyana	Shakira Baksh	20	Georgetown
Honduras	Alba María Bobadilla	17	San Pedro Sula
Iceland	Hrefna Wigelund Steinþórsdóttir	18	Reykjavik
(Republic of Ireland) Ireland	Gemma McNabb	19	Dublin
Israel	Dalia Regev	22	Tel Aviv
Italy	Tamara Baroni	20	Parma
Jamaica	Laurel Williams	20	Kingston
Japan	Chikako Sotoyama	23	Tochigi
Kenya	Zipporah Mbugua	20	Nairobi
Lebanon	Sonia Fares	18	Beirut
Luxembourg	Marie-Joseé Mathgen	18	Esch-sur-Alzette
Malta	Mary Mifsud	18	St. Julian's
Mexico	María Cristina Ortal	22	Los Angeles, California
Morocco	Naima Benjelloun	17	Casablanca
Netherlands	Monica van Beelen	20	Zaandam
New Zealand	Pamela McLeod	18	Christchurch
Nigeria	Roseline Balogun	20	Lagos
Norway	Vigdis Sollie	21	Horten
Panama	Carlota Lozano	22	Colón
Peru	Madeleine Hartog-Bel	21	Piura
Philippines	Margarita Gomez	20	Manila
Portugal	Teresa Amaro	20	Lisbon
South Africa	Disa Duivestein	21	Durban
South Korea	Chung Young-hwa	21	Seoul
Sweden	Eva Englander	20	Borås
Switzerland	Edith Fraefel	18	Bischofszell
Tanzania	Theresa Shayo	23	Dar es Salaam
Tunisia	Rekeja Dekhil	19	Tunis
Turkey	Nese Yazicigil	23	Istanbul
Uganda	Rosemary Salmon	18	Kampala
(United Kingdom) United Kingdom	Jennifer Lynn Lewis	20	Glenfield
United States	Pamela Valari Pall	20	Norwalk
Venezuela	Irene Böttger	22	Caracas
Yugoslavia	Aleksandra Mandić	19	Sarajevo
