= Fiorella Viñas =

Peruvian model

Fiorella Viñas (born c. 1984) is a Peruvian model and beauty pageant titleholder who was crowned Miss Peru 2006. She represented the Peruvian region of Lambayeque and won the title of Miss Peru Universe. She competed at the Miss Universe 2006 pageant held on 23 July 2006 in Los Angeles where she didn't place as a finalist.
