= Karol Castillo =

Peruvian model (1989–2013)

- Born: Karol Stephanie Castillo Pinillos; August 29, 1989; Trujillo, Peru
- Died: April 10, 2013 (aged 23); Sydney, Australia
- Occupations: Model; beauty pageant contestant
- Height: 1.85 m (6 ft 1 in)
- Beauty pageant titleholder
- Title: Miss Perú Universo 2008
- Hair color: Black
- Major competitions: Miss Perú Universo 2008 (Winner); Miss Universe 2008 (Unplaced)

Karol Stephanie Castillo Pinillos (29 August 1989 – 10 April 2013) was a Peruvian fashion model. She participated in various beauty pageants. She was crowned Miss Perú Universo 2008 and competed in the Miss Universe 2008 pageant, held in Nha Trang, Vietnam.

== Life ==
Castillo was the daughter of Luis Castillo and Zoila Pinillos. Her brothers were Paulo and Bruno, with whom she grew up in northern Peru. She began her modeling career at a young age and was a candidate for Miss La Libertad in 2007, when she was 18. Her measurements were 90-62-96 (waist-waist-hips). The Peruvian native participated in the Miss Teen Peru pageant at age 15 but did not win. In 2008, the psychology student at César Vallejo University in Lima participated in Miss Perú Universo and won. With this victory, she automatically qualified for the Miss Universe pageant in Nha Trang, Vietnam. There, she only impressed in the national costume competition, where she was one of the ten finalists out of 80 participants.

== Death ==
On April 10, 2013, Castillo was found dead in her bed during a trip to Australia, after suffering a cardiac arrest, in the city of Sydney. Reportedly, Castillo had traveled to Australia with coach Diego Alcade Sangalli to help with the Miss Teen Australia pageant. According to sources, she has a history of cardiovascular problems.
