= Miss Perú 1987 =

- Date: March 20, 1987
- Presenters: Jorge Beleván, Silvia Maccera
- Venue: Coliseo Cerrado La casa de la Juventud - Cuzco
- Broadcaster: Panamericana Televisión
- Entrants: 18
- Winner: Jessica Newton; Callao

The Miss Perú 1987 pageant was held on March 20, 1987. That year, 18 candidates were competing for the national crown. The chosen winner represented Peru at the Miss Universe 1987. The rest of the finalists would enter in different pageants.

== Placements ==
Final Results	Contestant
Miss Peru Universe 1987	Callao - Jessica Newton Vasquez-Saenz
Miss International Peru 1987	Ancash - Rosario Leguía Nugent
Miss Peru Asia-Pacific 1987	Arequipa - Marilú Bustamente
1st Runner-Up	Cajamarca - Silvana Cultrera
Top 8	Ica - Isabel Quinonez; Tacna - Maria del Pilar Díaz; Region Lima - Gabriela Rodríguez; Cuzco - Mariana Bacca

== Special awards ==
- Best Regional Costume - Cuzco - Mariana Bacca
- Miss Photogenic - Ancash - Rosario Leguía
- Miss Elegance - Loreto - Ma. Gabriela Strauss
- Miss Body - Tacna - Maria del Pilar Díaz
- Best Hair - Piura - Luz Marina Origi
- Miss Congeniality - Tumbes - Elizabeth da Silva
- Most Beautiful Face - Ancash - Rosario Leguía Nugent

.

== Delegates ==
- Áncash - Rosario Leguía
- Arequipa - Marilú Bustamente
- Cajamarca - Silvana Cultrera
- Callao - Jessica Newton
- Cuzco - Mariana Bacca
- Huanuco - Jenny Diaz (AUS)
- Ica - Isabel Quinonez
- La Libertad - Ana María de Bracamonte
- Lambayeque - Jenny Villena
- Loreto - Maria Gabriela Strauss
- Moquegua - Carmelita Abad
- Piura - Luz Marina Origi
- Region Lima - Gabriela Rodríguez
- San Martín - Mariel Guerra
- Tacna - Maria del Pilar Díaz
- Tumbes - Elizabeth da Silva
- Ucayali - Lorena Andreu
- Urubamba - Teresa Ramos
- USA Perú - Gisella Liberace

== Judges ==
- Alvaro López - Mayor of Cuzco City
- Gladys Zender Urbina - Miss Universe 1957
- Edilberto Mérida - Peruvian Sculptor
- Julio Ruiz-López - Manager of Elizabeth Arden Makeup
- Nelly de Samane - Fashion Designer at Boutique Jessica
- Alfonso Pait - Manager of Beauty Form
- Raul Delgado de la Flor - General Manager of Hotel San Agustin Int.
- Luz Rey - Hilos Cadena Llave S.A.
- Juan Carlos Castro Nally - Peruvian Pianist
- Daniel Bermejo - Manager of Paraíso S.A.

.

== Music & Special Guests Singers ==
- Swimsuit Competition – MFSB - "Summertime"
- Evening Gown Competition – MFSB - "I'm Feelin' Mellow"
- Francesco Petrozzi - "Canción de Abril"
- Grupo Arco Iris del Cusco - "Todos Juntos"
- Cecilia Bracamonte - "Dueño Ausente"

.
