= Miss World 2004 =

International beauty pageant

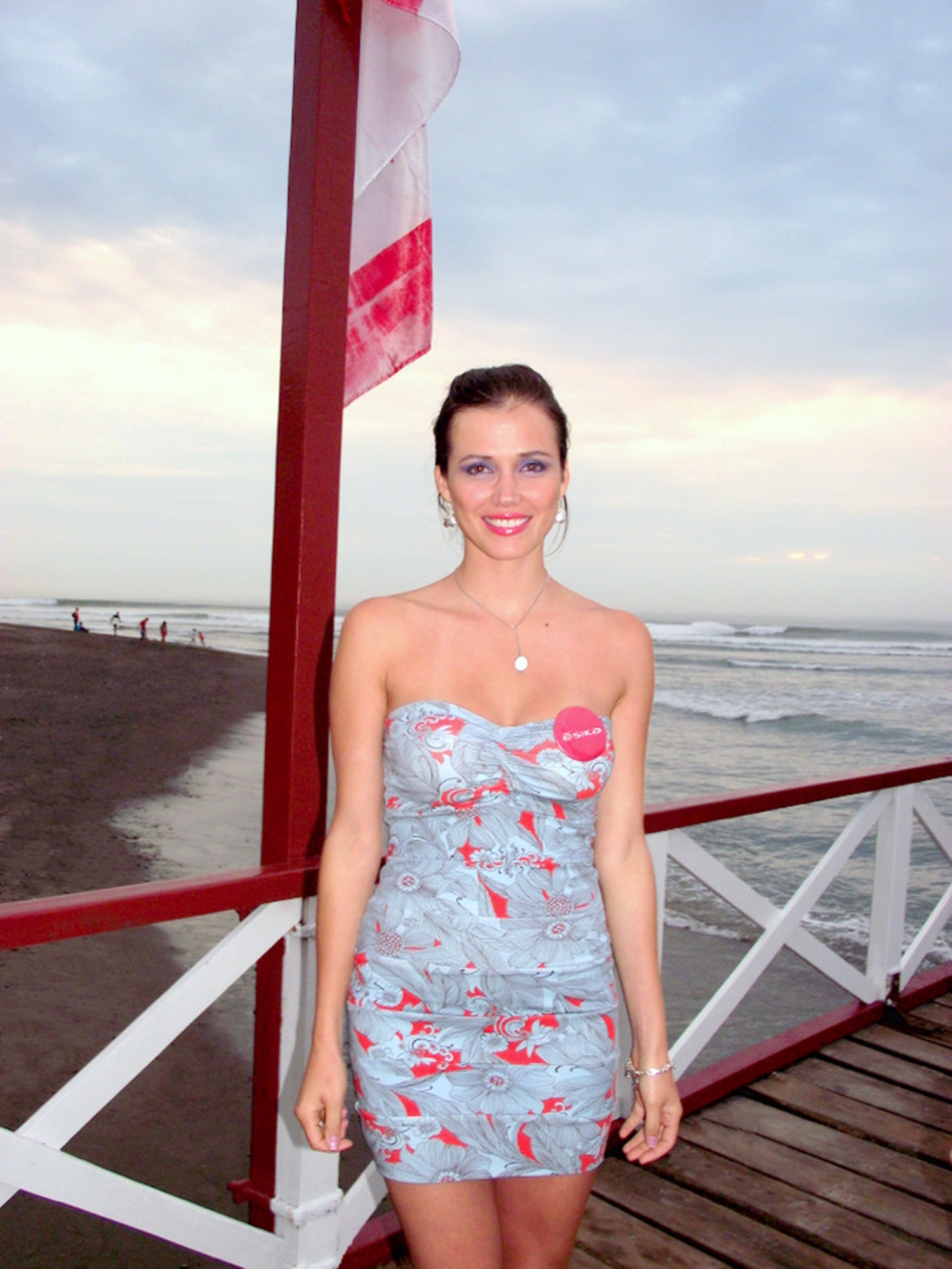
- Miss World 2004, María Julia Mantilla
- Date: 4 December 2004
- Presenters: Troy McClain; Angela Chow; Lisa Snowdon
- Entertainment: Lionel Richie; Il Divo
- Venue: Crown of Beauty Theatre, Sanya, China
- Broadcaster: International: E!; Official broadcaster: CCTV
- Entrants: 107
- Placements: 15
- Debuts: Fiji
- Withdrawals: Andorra; Belize; Guatemala; Northern Mariana Islands; Lesotho; Swaziland; Uruguay
- Returns: Egypt; El Salvador; Ghana; Honduras; Saint Lucia; Taiwan; Turks and Caicos Islands
- Winner: María Julia Mantilla; Peru

Miss World 2004, the 54th edition of the Miss World pageant, was held on 4 December 2004 at the Crown of Beauty Theatre in Sanya, China. The 2004 pageant marks the second straight year that Sanya played host of the pageant.

At the end of the event, Rosanna Davison of Ireland crowned her successor María Julia Mantilla of Peru. 107 contestants from all over the world competed for the crown marking at that time, the biggest turnout in the pageant's 54-year history. That record was held until Miss World 2008 where 109 nations sent representatives.

== Debuts, returns, and, withdrawals ==
This edition saw the debut of Fiji and the return of Egypt, El Salvador, Ghana, Honduras, Saint Lucia, Taiwan and Turks and Caicos Islands; Turks and Caicos Islands, which last competed in 1988, El Salvador in 1993, Saint Lucia in 1994, Egypt in 1997, Taiwan and Honduras in 2000 and Ghana in 2002.

Andorra, Belize, Guatemala, Lesotho, Northern Mariana Islands, Swaziland and Uruguay, withdrew from the competition.

== Results ==
=== Placements ===
Placement	Contestant
Miss World 2004	Peru – María Julia Mantilla
1st Runner-Up	Dominican Republic – Claudia Cruz
2nd Runner-Up	United States – Nancy Randall
Top 5	Philippines – Karla Bautista; Poland – Katarzyna Borowicz
Top 15	Antigua and Barbuda – Shermain Jeremy; Australia – Sarah Davies; China – Yang Jin; Czech Republic – Jana Doleželová; Mexico – Yessica Ramírez; Nigeria – Anita Uwagbale; Russia – Tatiana Sidorchuk; Trinidad and Tobago – Kenisha Thom; Vietnam – Nguyễn Thị Huyền; Wales – Amy Guy

==== Continental Queens of Beauty ====
Continental Group	Contestant
Africa	Nigeria – Anita Uwagbale
Americas	United States – Nancy Randall
Asia & Oceania	Philippines – Maria Karla Bautista
Caribbean	Dominican Republic – Claudia Cruz
Europe	Poland – Katarzyna Borowicz

== Contestants ==
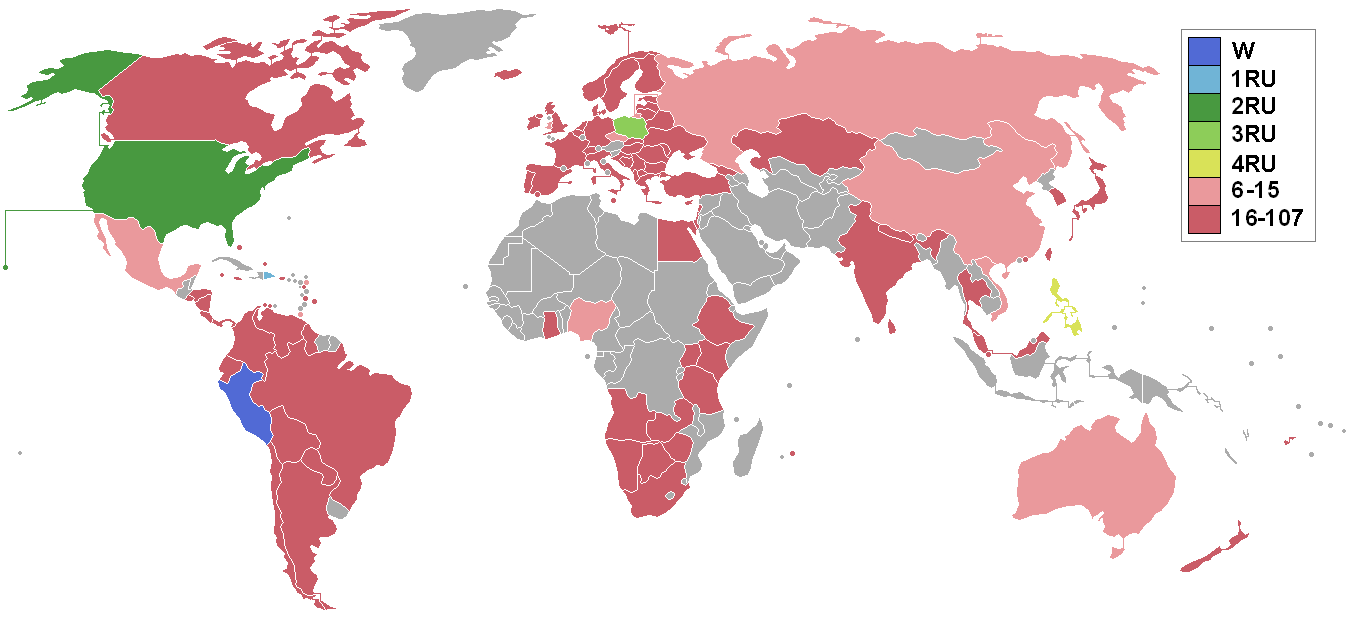
Countries and territories which sent delegates and results for Miss World 2004

107 contestants participated in Miss World 2004.

Code	Country	Contestant	Age (Note: Ages at the time of the pageant)	Hometown
612	Albania	Agnesa Vuthaj	18	Pristina
701	Angola	Silvia Anair Joao de Deus	20	Luanda
409	Antigua and Barbuda	Shermain Jeremy	23	St. John's
801	Argentina	Verónica Estarriaga	24	Buenos Aires
610	Aruba	Luisana Cicilia	20	Dacota
602	Australia	Sarah Davies	22	Brisbane
410	Bahamas	Brianna Clarke	23	Nassau
705	Barbados	Kennifer Marius	20	Christ Church
206	Belarus	Olga Antropova	22	Polotsk
111	Belgium	Ellen Petri	22	Merksem
802	Bolivia	María Nuvia Montenegro	18	Reyes
503	Bosnia and Herzegovina	Njegica Balorda	19	Zvornik
306	Botswana	Juby Peacock	20	Maun
702	Brazil	Iara Coelho	23	Minas Gerais
213	Bulgaria	Gergana Guncheva	17	Sofia
509	Canada	Tijana Arnautović	18	Ottawa
103	Cayman Islands	Stacy Ann-Rose Kelly	24	Bodden Town
207	Chile	Verónica Roberts	21	Santiago
808	China	Yang Jin	20	Chongqing
208	Colombia	Paola Mariňo	22	Bogotá
407	Costa Rica	Shirley Calvo	22	Alajuela
613	Croatia	Ivana Žnidarić	19	Čakovec
611	Curaçao	Sue-Ann Hudson	20	Willemstad
507	Cyprus	Constantina Evripidou	19	Limassol
209	Czech Republic	Jana Doleželová	23	Uničov
805	Denmark	Line Solling Larsen	23	Funen
113	Dominican Republic	Claudia Cruz	18	Bonao
101	Ecuador	Cristina Reyes	23	Guayaquil
107	Egypt	Heba El-Sisy	22	Cairo
513	El Salvador	Andrea Müschenborn	18	San Salvador
311	England	Danielle Lloyd	20	Liverpool
709	Estonia	Moonika Tooming	23	Tallinn
413	Ethiopia	Sayat Demissie	18	Addis Ababa
308	Fiji	Aishwarya Sukhdeo	24	Suva
603	Finland	Nina Tikanmäki	19	Naantali
112	France	Laetitia Marciniak	23	Calais
205	Georgia	Salome Chikviladze	20	Tbilisi
506	Germany	Inka Weickel	20	Alzey
305	Ghana	Serena Naa Dei Ashi Roye	23	Accra
707	Gibraltar	Helen Gustafson	24	Gibraltar
508	Greece	Maria Spiridaki	19	Heraklion
713	Guadeloupe	Jennifer Desbouiges	18	Pointe-à-Pitre
114	Guyana	Suzette Marissa Shim	19	Georgetown
514	Honduras	Kimberly McNab	19	Roatan
313	Hong Kong	Queenie Chu	23	Hong Kong
403	Hungary	Veronika Orban	20	Zalaegerszeg
604	Iceland	Hugrún Harðardóttir	21	Selfoss
605	India	Sayali Bhagat	20	Nashik
510	Ireland	Natasha Nic Gairbheirth	21	Gweedore
710	Israel	Rita Lukin	23	Ashdod
303	Italy	Valeria Altobelli	20	Rome
706	Jamaica	Tonoya Toyloy	24	Kingston
307	Japan	Minako Goto	22	Akita
203	Kazakhstan	Aleksandra Kazakova	19	Oskemen
511	Kenya	Juliet Atieno Ochieng	19	Kisumu
401	Latvia	Agnese Eiduka	20	Valmiera
108	Lebanon	Nadine Njeim	20	Beirut
502	Lithuania	Agne Maliaukaitė	19	Panevėžys
214	Macedonia	Sara Lesi	18	Skopje
810	Malaysia	Gloria Ting Mei Ru	23	Sibu
304	Malta	Antonella Vella	20	Mosta
811	Mauritius	Magalie Antoo	22	Rose Hill
607	Mexico	Yessica Ramírez	22	Tijuana
204	Moldova	Marina Chivaciuc	21	Tiraspol
414	Namibia	Adele Basson	24	Windhoek
714	Nepal	Payal Shakya	18	Kathmandu
105	Netherlands	Miranda Slabber	24	Arnemuiden
301	New Zealand	Amber Peebles	21	Auckland
608	Nicaragua	Anielka Sánchez	22	Masaya
512	Nigeria	Anita Uwagbale	19	Lagos
210	Northern Ireland	Kirsty Stewart	18	Enniskillen
806	Norway	Hege Torresdal	20	Aksdal
408	Panama	Melissa Piedrahita	22	Panama City
703	Paraguay	Tania Domanickzy	23	Asunción
804	Peru	María Julia Mantilla	20	Trujillo
309	Philippines	Karla Bautista	20	Cebu City
501	Poland	Katarzyna Borowicz	19	Ostrów Wielkopolski
704	Portugal	Patrícia de Oliveira	17	Lisbon
102	Puerto Rico	Cassandra Castro	20	Luquillo
601	Romania	Adina Maria Cotuna	20	Arad
201	Russia	Tatiana Sidorchuk	19	Perm
104	Saint Lucia	Sascha Andrew-Rose	18	Castries
106	Scotland	Lois Anna Weatherup	21	Linlithgow
404	Serbia and Montenegro	Jelena Pejić	17	Belgrade
807	Singapore	Lisa Huang	22	Singapore
504	Slovakia	Mária Sándorová	20	Košice
402	Slovenia	Živa Vadnov	22	Ljubljana
712	South Africa	Joan Ramagoshi	24	Mamelodi
314	South Korea (Note: Competed as Korea in the pageant)	Han Kyoung-jin	19	Seongnam
803	Spain	Maite Medina Cerrato	24	Barcelona
109	Sri Lanka	Anarkalli Aakarsha	17	Colombo
312	Sweden	Eva Helena Hjertonsson	19	Kalmar
711	Switzerland	Fiona Hefti	24	Zurich
809	(Chinese Taipei) Taiwan (Note: competed as Chinese Taipei in the pageant)	Dorothy Chu Yi Hui	18	Taipei
211	Tanzania	Faraja Kotta	19	Dar es Salaam
310	Thailand	Nikallaya Abdul Dulaya	23	Yala
405	Trinidad and Tobago	Kenisha Thom	21	Scarborough
110	Turkey	Nur Gümüşdoğrayan	19	Ankara
406	Turks and Caicos Islands	Beryl Christian Kateri Handfield	19	Grand Turk
212	Uganda	Barbara Kimbugwe	19	Kampala
202	Ukraine	Lesya Matveyeva	22	Kyiv
708	United States	Nancy Randall	24	New Orleans
609	Venezuela	Andrea Milroy	20	Caracas
606	Vietnam	Nguyễn Thị Huyền	19	Haiphong
302	Wales	Amy Guy	21	Wrexham
411	Zambia	Rosemary Mulenga Chileshe	24	Lusaka
412	Zimbabwe	Oslie Muringai	20	Bulawayo

== Notes ==
=== Withdrawals ===
- Northern Mariana Islands- Tracy Lynn D. De Rosario - Due to financial problems and lack of Sponsorship.
- Uruguay - María Jimena Rivas Fernández - Due to visa problems.

=== No Shows ===
- Algeria - Karmen Hamdaoui
- Armenia - Lusine Tovmasyan
- Austria – Silvia Hackl - She withdrew at the last minute for personal reasons.
- Democratic Republic of the Congo – Nelly Dembo Osongo - Due to lack of Sponsorship and visa problems. However she competed a year later at Miss World 2005.
- Guatemala - Damaris Stephanie García Guerrero
- Malawi - Florence Zeka
- Mongolia - Sodtuya Chaadrabal
- Mozambique

Never confirmed

- Andorra
- Belize
- Lesotho
- Swaziland
- Tunisia
- United States Virgin Islands

=== Replacements ===
- Aruba - Miss Aruba 2003, Fatima Salie was unable to compete in Miss Universe & Miss World 2004 due problems with her nationality. She was replaced by her first runner up, Luisana Nikualy Cicilia.
- Estonia - Mari-Liis Sallo
- Germany - Claudia Hein
- India - The winner of Femina Miss India World 2004, Lakshmi Pandit gave up the crown to 2nd Runner-Up - Sayali Bhagat
- Mauritius - Connie Ross

=== Country changes ===
- Holland changed its name to Netherlands.
