= Miss World 2002 =

Beauty pageant edition

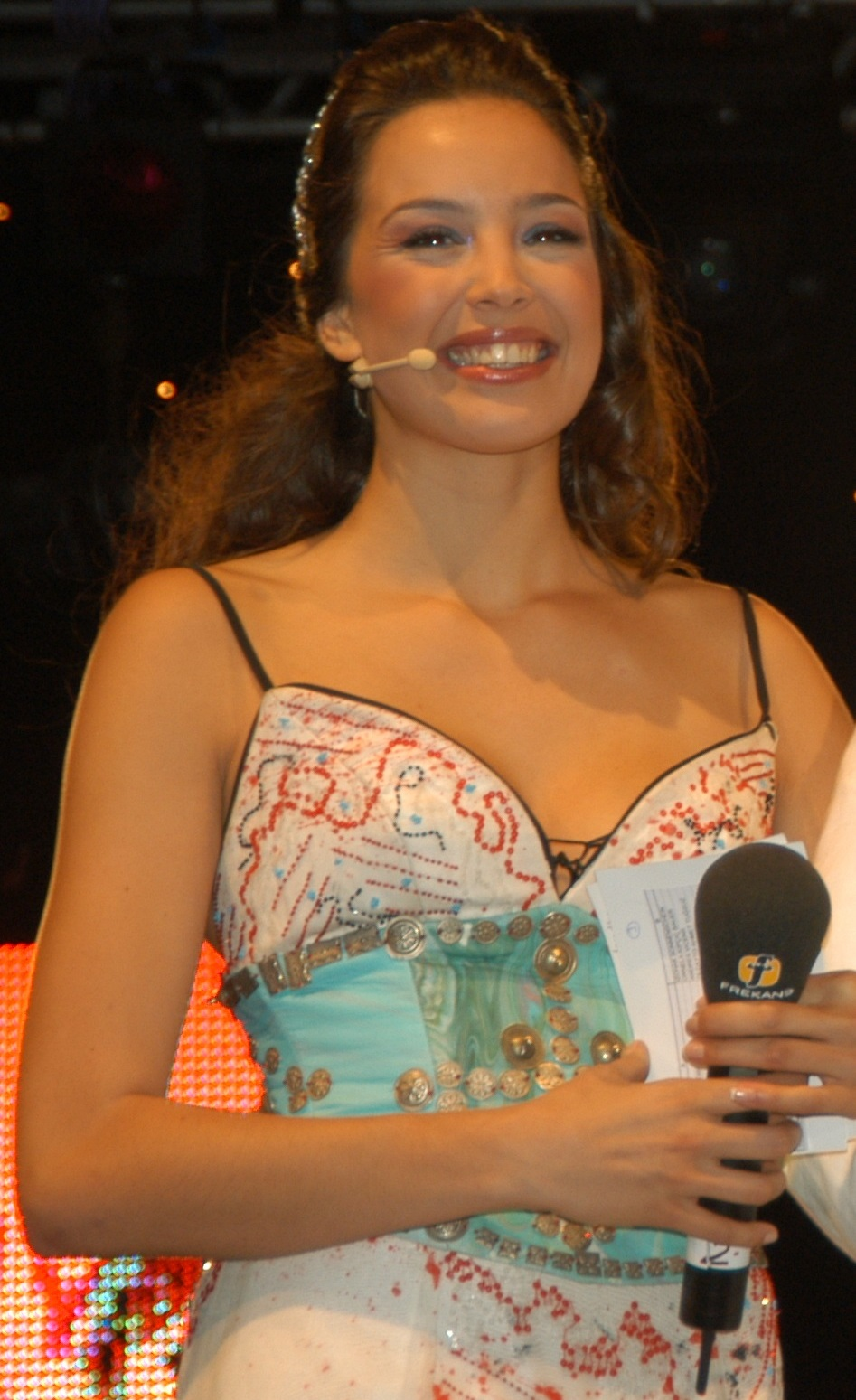
- Miss World 2002 titleholder – Azra Akın
- Date: 7 December 2002
- Presenters: Sean Kanan; Claire Elizabeth Smith
- Entertainment: Chayanne; BBMak
- Venue: Alexandra Palace, London, United Kingdom
- Broadcaster: E!
- Entrants: 88
- Placements: 20
- Debuts: Albania; Algeria; Vietnam
- Withdrawals: Austria; Bangladesh; British Virgin Islands; Cayman Islands; Costa Rica; Dominican Republic; Hawaii; Iceland; Madagascar; Malawi; Portugal; Sint Maarten; South Korea; Switzerland
- Returns: Bahamas; Belize; Curaçao; Kazakhstan; Lithuania; Swaziland
- Winner: Azra Akın; Turkey

Miss World 2002, the 52nd edition of the Miss World pageant, was held on 7 December 2002 at the Alexandra Palace in London, United Kingdom. It was initially intended to be staged in Abuja, but due to religious riots in the nearby city of Kaduna (the "Miss World riots") the pageant was relocated to London.

A total of 110 contestants from all over the world were initially invited to compete for the crown, but several contestants boycotted the pageant and others dropping out in protest for the death sentence by stoning determined by an Islamic Sharia court to Amina Lawal, a Nigerian woman accused of adultery, making a total of 88 women competing for the crown. It was the first time that audience participation through text messaging together with the scores of the judges helped in determining the results for the Top 20. Azra Akın from Turkey won the pageant, becoming the first ever representative from her country to be crowned Miss World. She was crowned by Agbani Darego of Nigeria. Show organizers stated that the event had a global viewership of over 2 billion people, and that it was broadcast in 137 countries. It was the first time in 51 years that it was not shown in the UK; no British channel agreed to broadcast the event. Runner-Up was Natalia Peralta from Colombia, and third was Marina Mora from Peru.

== Selection of participants ==
=== Replacements ===
Miss Bulgaria 2002, Teodora Burgazlieva was replaced by her second runner-up, Desislava Guleva because she did some nude pictures for Club M magazine before winning the Miss Bulgaria 2002 crown.

Miss České republiky 2002, Kateřina Průšová didn't compete internationally due to her English skills. She was replaced by Kateřina Smržová

Miss Germany Wahl 2002, Katrin Wrobel, had to relinquish the crown because she wanted to focus on her modeling career. However her first runner-up, Simone Wolf-Reinfurt, got sick just days before her departure to Nigeria and also was replaced by the second runner-up of Miss Germany Wahl 2002, Indira Selmic.

Miss South Africa 2002 and the third runner-up of Miss Universe 2002, Vanessa Carreira was unable to go to Miss World 2002 as the Miss South Africa 2003 contest was 1 day after the Miss World 2002 contest and she had to crown her successor. Also she refused to participate in protest of the conviction of Amina Lawal. Another South African pageant organization called, Miss Junior South Africa, sent their 2002 winner, Karen Lourens. However Miss World Organization accepted the first runner-up of Miss South Africa 2002, Claire Sabbagha to participate in Miss World 2002 despite being overage.

Miss Ukraine 2002, Olena Stohniy couldn't participate due to the fact that she was overage for Miss World rules, she was just 25 years old. She was replaced by one of her runners-up, Iryna Udovenko.

=== Debuts, returns, and withdrawals ===
This edition saw the debut of Albania, Algeria and Vietnam, and the return of The Bahamas, Belize, Curaçao, Kazakhstan, Lithuania and Swaziland; Belize, which last competed in 1991, Swaziland in 1999 and The Bahamas, Curaçao, Kazakhstan and Lithuania in 2000.

Austria, Bangladesh, the British Virgin Islands, Cayman Islands, Costa Rica, Dominican Republic, Hawaii, Iceland, Madagascar, Malawi, Portugal, Sint Maarten, South Korea and Switzerland, withdrew from the competition. Ungfrú Ísland 2002, Sólveig Zophoníasdóttir was dethroned following her nude photos in Playboy magazine. But none of her runners-up accepted the crown for different reasons and disagreements over the winner's contract. Then the organizers picked Eyrun Steinsson as a new representative for Miss World 2002, but she later decided to boycott the contest.

== Results ==
=== Placements ===
Placement	Contestant
Miss World 2002	Turkey – Azra Akın
1st Runner-Up	Colombia – Natalia Peralta
2nd Runner-Up	Peru – Marina Mora
Top 10	Australia – Nicole-Rita Ghazal; China – Wu Ying Na; Nigeria – Chinenye Ochuba; Norway – Kathrine Sørland; Philippines – Katherine Anne Manalo; United States – Rebekah Revels; Venezuela – Goizeder Azúa
Top 20	Aruba – Rachelle Oduber; Bosnia and Herzegovina – Danijela Vins; Curaçao – Ayannette Statia; Holland – Elise Boulogne; India – Shruti Sharma; Italy – Susanne Zuber; Puerto Rico – Cassandra Berrios; Russia – Anna Tatarintseva; Vietnam – Phạm Thị Mai Phương; Yugoslavia – Ana Sargic

==== Continental Queens of Beauty ====
Continental Group	Contestant
Africa	Nigeria – Chinenye Akinlade
Americas	Colombia – Natalia Peralta
Asia & Oceania	China – Wu Ying Na
Caribbean	Aruba – Rachelle Oduber
Europe	Turkey – Azra Akın

== Contestants ==
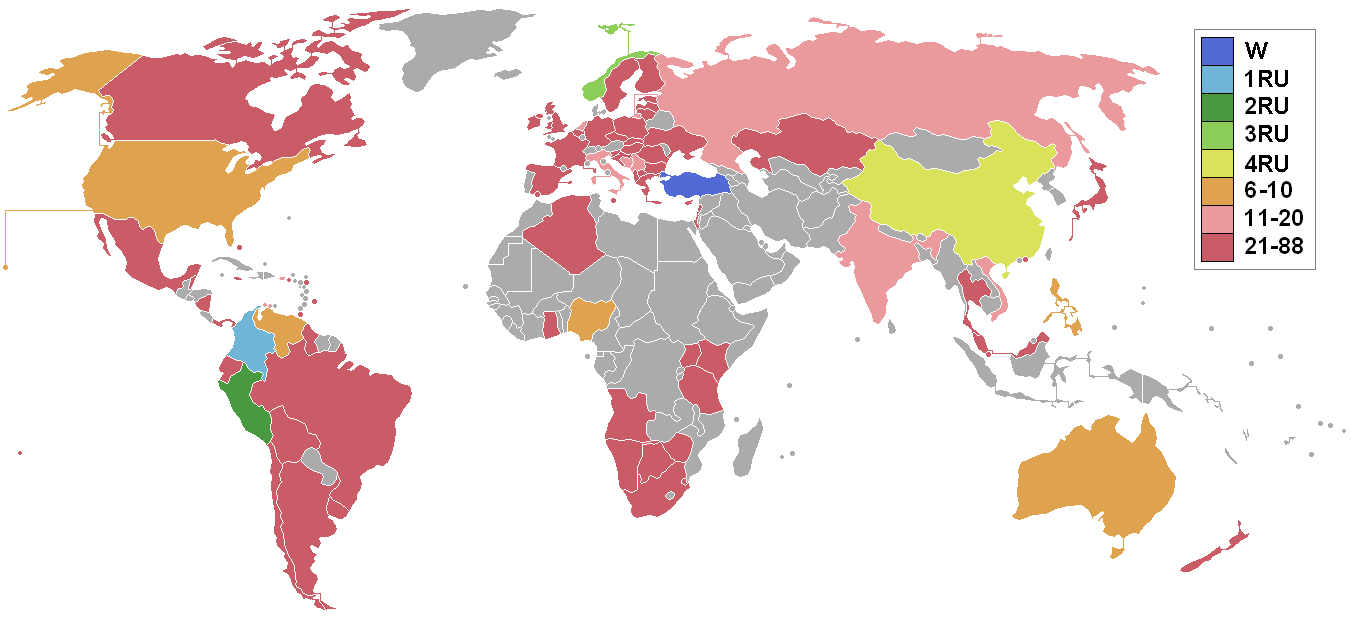
Countries and territories which sent delegates and results

88 contestants participated in Miss World 2002.

Country	Contestant	Age (Note: Ages at the time of the pageant)	Hometown
Albania	Anjeza Maja	21	–
Algeria	Lamia Saoudi	22	Algiers
Angola	Rosa Mujinga Muxito	21	Luanda
Antigua and Barbuda	Zara Razzaq	19	Saint John's
Argentina	Tamara Henriksen	25	Buenos Aires
Aruba	Rachelle Oduber	21	Oranjestad
Australia	Nicole Ghazal	23	Gold Coast
Bahamas	T'Shura Ambrose	25	Nassau
Barbados	Natalie Webb-Howell	20	Bridgetown
Belgium	Sylvie Doclot	22	Brussels
Belize	Karen Russell	24	Belize City
Bolivia	Alejandra Montero	17	Iténez
Bosnia and Herzegovina	Danijela Vinš	17	Sarajevo
Botswana	Lomaswati Dlamini	20	Gaborone
Brazil	Taísa Thomsen	20	Joinville
Bulgaria	Desislava Antoniya Guleva	18	Pleven
Canada	Lynsey Bennett	22	Ottawa
Chile	Daniela Sofía Casanova	22	Valparaiso
China	Wu Ying Na	17	Hainan
Colombia	Natalia Peralta	21	Antioquia
Croatia	Nina Slamić	18	Šibenik
Curaçao	Ayannette Statia	19	Willemstad
Cyprus	Anjela Drousiotou	21	Nicosia
Czech Republic	Kateřina Smržová	23	Prague
Ecuador	Jessica Angulo	20	Santo Domingo
England	Danielle Luan	22	Oxford
Estonia	Triin Sommer	19	Pärnu
Finland	Hanne Hynynen	21	Ylivieska
France	Caroline Chamorand	21	Paris
French Polynesia (Note: Competed as Tahiti in the pageant)	Rava Maiarii	19	Taha'a
Germany	Indira Selmic	24	Berlin
Ghana	Shaida Buari	20	Accra
Gibraltar	Damaris Hollands	21	Gibraltar
Greece	Katerina Georgiadou	21	Athens
Guyana	Odessa Phillips	19	Vergenoegen
Holland	Elise Boulogne	20	Leiden
Hong Kong	Victoria Jolly	20	Hong Kong
Hungary	Renata Rozs	21	Janossomorja
India	Shruti Sharma	22	New Delhi
Ireland	Lynda Duffy	22	Galway
Israel	Karol Lowenstein	19	Haifa
Italy	Susanne Zuber	21	Merano
Jamaica	Danielle O'Hayon	18	Kingston
Japan	Yuko Nabeta	19	Tokyo
Kazakhstan	Olga Sidorenko	19	Almaty
Kenya	Marianne Kariuki	18	Nairobi
Latvia	Baiba Švarca	20	Riga
Lebanon	Bethany Kehdy	21	Beirut
Lithuania	Oksana Semenišina	20	Vilnius
Macedonia	Jasna Spasovska	20	Skopje
Malaysia	Mabel Ng Chin Mei	24	Pulau Tikus
Malta	Joyce Gatt	18	Balzan
Mexico	Blanca Zumárraga	20	Córdoba
Namibia	Ndapewa Alfons	23	Kaisosi
New Zealand	Rachel Huljich	18	Auckland
Nicaragua	Hazel Calderón	25	León
Nigeria	Chinenye Ochuba	18	Lagos
Northern Ireland	Gayle Williamson	22	Dollingstown
Norway	Kathrine Sørland	21	Sola
Panama	Yoselin Sánchez	21	Los Santos
Peru	Marina Mora	22	Lima
Philippines	Katherine Anne Manalo	23	Parañaque
Poland	Marta Matyjasik	20	Zgorzelec
Puerto Rico	Cassandra Polo Berríos	18	Guaynabo
Romania	Cleopatra Popescu	23	Sibiu
Russia	Anna Tatarintseva	24	Nizhny Novgorod
Scotland	Paula Murphy	24	Stirling
Singapore	Sharon Cintamani	23	Singapore
Slovakia	Eva Verešová	22	Nitra
Slovenia	Nataša Krajnc	21	Celje
South Africa	Claire Sabbagha	25	Johannesburg
Spain	Lola Alcocer	21	Seville
Swaziland	Nozipho Shabangu	20	Mbabane
Sweden	Sophia Hedmark	20	Stockholm
Tanzania	Angela Damas Mtalima	20	Dar es Salaam
Thailand	Ticha Lueng-Pairoj	21	Nakhon Pathom
Trinidad and Tobago	Janelle Rajnauth	21	Port of Spain
Turkey	Azra Akın	20	Istanbul
Uganda	Rehema Nakuya	20	Mbarara
Ukraine	Irina Udovenko	21	Azov
United States	Rebekah Revels	22	St. Pauls
United States Virgin Islands	Hailey Cagan	17	Saint John
Uruguay	Natalia Figueras	21	Montevideo
Venezuela	Goizeder Azúa	18	San Felipe
Vietnam	Phạm Thị Mai Phương	17	Hải Phòng
Wales	Michelle Bush	22	Cardiff
Yugoslavia	Ana Šargić	19	Valjevo
Zimbabwe	Linda Van Beek	20	Harare

== Notes ==
=== Withdrawals during the contest ===
- Guatemala – Paula Margarita Alonso Morales the Miss World riots in Nigeria, with no intention to return.
- Malawi – Blandina Mlenga
- Mauritius – Karen Alexandre
- South Korea – Yu-Kyung Chang - She withdrew during
- Sri Lanka – Nilusha Gamage

=== Withdrawals, but later re-incorporated into the contest after moved to London ===
- Canada – Lynsey Bennett
- Panama – Yoselin Sánchez Espino
- Spain – Lola Alcocer
- Tahiti – Rava Maiarii

=== Boycotting due to Amina Lawal case ===
- Austria – Celine Roschek
- Costa Rica – Shirley Alvarez Sandoval
- Denmark – Masja Juel
- Iceland – Eyrun Steinsson
- Switzerland – Nadine Vinzens

Also boycotting but never invited:

- Côte d'Ivoire – Yannick Azebian
- Togo – Sandrine Akuvi Agbokpe

=== Misc. Withdrawals and initial boycotts, but re-incorporated into the contest later on ===
- England - Danielle Luan went home after the contest moved to London with no intentions of rejoining but was later convinced to rejoin the competition under the condition that she was to not be officially judged in the pageant during finals night.
- Norway - Katrine Sørland initially boycotted due to the Amina Lawal case but later rejoined after being promised by Julia Morley, the then President of Nigeria, Chief Olusegun Obasanjo, and the Nigerian Foreign Ministry that Lawal wouldn't be stoned to death.

=== Invited but never confirmed ===
- Bangladesh - No contest
- Belarus - Volha Nevdakh
- British Virgin Islands - No contest
- Cameroon - Diane Ngo Mouaha
- Cayman Islands - No contest
- Dominican Republic - Claudia Cruz De Los Santos.
- Egypt - Ines Gohar - No Sponsorship and Founding, she went to Miss Earth 2002 insertead.
- Hawaii - No contest. Lost its licence for Miss World.
- Lesotho - Annie Andrews
- Liberia - Marcia Cooper
- Madagascar - No contest
- Moldova - No contest
- Morocco - Doja Lahlou
- Nepal - No contest
- Paraguay - Lost its licence for Miss World until 2003.
- Portugal - No contest
- Sint Maarten - No contest. Lost its licence for Miss World.
- Zambia - No contest

=== Replacements ===
- Argentina – Daniela Estefania Puig
- Belgium – Miss Belgium 2002, Ann Van Elsen refused to participate in protest of the conviction of Amina Lawal.
- France – Miss France 2002, Sylvie Tellier refused to participate in protest of the conviction of Amina Lawal.
- Italy – The winner of Miss Mondo Italia 2002, Pamela Camassa was replaced by the first runner up, Susanne Zuber.
- United States Virgin Islands – Cubie-Ayah George

=== Historical significance ===
In the year leading up the finals in Nigeria, several European title holders lobbied their governments and the EU parliament to support Amina Lawal's cause. A number of contestants followed the lead of Kathrine Sørland of Norway in boycotting the contest (despite the controversy Sørland went on to become a semi-finalist in both the Miss World and Miss Universe contest), while others such as Costa Rica were instructed by their national governments and parliaments not to attend the contest. Among the other boycotting nations were Denmark, Spain, Switzerland, Panama, Belgium and Kenya. There was further controversy over the possibly suspended participation of France and South Africa, which may or may not have been due to the boycott. For her part, Lawal asked that contestants not suspend their participation in the contest, saying that it was for the good of her country and that they could, as the representative of Sweden had earlier remarked, make a much stronger case for her on the ground in Nigeria.

Despite the increasing profile the boycott was garnering in the press, the contest went ahead in Nigeria after being rescheduled to avoid taking place during Ramadan, with many prominent nations sending delegates. Osmel Sousa of Venezuela, one of the world's most influential national directors, famously said "there is no question about it (the participation of Miss Venezuela in the contest)." The trouble did not end there, however. A Thisday (Lagos, Nigeria) newspaper editorial suggesting that Muhammad would probably have chosen one of his wives from among the contestants had he been alive to see it, resulted in inter-religious riots that started on 22 November in which over 200 people were killed in the city of Kaduna, along with many houses of worship being burned by religious zealots. Because of these "Miss World riots", the 2002 pageant was moved to London, following widely circulated reports that the representatives of Canada and Korea had withdrawn from the contest and returned to their respective countries out of safety concerns. A fatwa urging the beheading of the woman who wrote the offending words, Isioma Daniel, was issued in Nigeria, but was declared null and void by the relevant Saudi Arabian authorities. Upon the pageant's return to England, many of the boycotting contestants chose to attend, including Miss Norway, Kathrine Sørland, who was tipped in the last few days as the number one favourite for the crown she had previously boycotted.
