= Miss La Libertad =

Beauty contest held in La Libertad Region, Peru

- Genre: Beauty contest
- Frequency: Annual
- Locations: Trujillo city, Peru
- Website: http://reinasdelalibertad.zzl.org/index.html

Miss La Libertad is a beauty contest that selects the representative for the La Libertad Region in the Miss Peru pageant. The current titleholder is Paola Rodríguez Larraín, who was crowned in April, 2012. The event is held annually, generally in Trujillo city. In 2012, it was held in the Plaza de Armas in the historic centre of Trujillo.

== Organization ==
Recent events have been organized by Isa Torres Castillo in several locations, such as the traditional Club Libertad, the ancient citadel of Chan Chan, Huanchaco beach and the historical Plaza de Armas.

== Winners ==
Year	Name	Home town	Age^{1}	Height	Title	Placement at Miss Peru	Special awards at Miss Peru	Notes	
1969	Maria Julia Mantilla Mayer	Trujillo	21	-	Miss La Libertad Universe	Winner	-	Top 15 in Miss Universe	
1996	Nataly Patricia Sacco Angeles	Trujillo	21	-	Miss La Libertad Universe	Winner	-	Top 10 in Miss Universe	
1998	Tatiana Carbonel	Trujillo	-	-	-	-	-	-	
1998	Mariana Larrabure de Orbegoso	Trujillo	25	1.75	Miss La Libertad World	Winner		Top 10 in Miss World	
-	Maricris Rubio	Trujillo	-	1.75 m	Miss La Libertad World	-	-	Miss Hawaiian Tropic Peru 2007	
2001	Marina Mora	Guadalupe	21	1.80 m	Miss La Libertad World	Winner	-	Princess of Miss World 2002 and she finished third. Miss Tourism World 2000	
2004	Lucía Alva Espinoza	Trujillo	25	1.72	Miss La Libertad Universe	-	-	-	
2004	Maria Julia Mantilla Garcia	Trujillo	19	1.75	Miss La Libertad World	Winner	-	Miss World 2004	
2005	Fiorela Flores Villegas	Trujillo	21	1.77 m	Miss La Libertad Universe	2nd runner-up	-	-	
2006	Silvia Cornejo	Trujillo	-	-	Miss La Libertad World	Winner	-	-	
2008	Karol Stephanie Castillo Pinillos	Trujillo	18	1.83	Miss La Libertad Universe	Winner	-	Top 10 best national dress in Miss World	
2008	Giosiana Huby Deza	Otuzco	17	1.78	Miss La Libertad World	Top 8	Best Face	-	
2009	Maria Lourdes Rodriguez Mantilla	Trujillo	19	1.77	Miss La Libertad	4th runner-Up Miss World Peru 2009	-	-	-
2010	Cinthia Risco Sanchez	Trujillo	22	1.73	Miss La Libertad Universe	3rd runner-Up	-	-	
2010	Estefani Mauricci Gil	Trujillo	17	1.74	Miss La Libertad World	Top 12	Miss Photogenic	-	
2011	Stefani Bueno Obando	Trujillo	21	1.76	Miss La Libertad Universe	4th runner-Up	-	-	
2011	Gisela Torres Gil	Trujillo	22	1.76	Miss La Libertad World	-	-	-	
2012	Paola Rodríguez Larraín	Trujillo	23	1.74	Miss La Libertad Universe	3rd runner-up	Miss Evolution Anti Age, Miss Internet	-	
2012	Akemi Giura Guanilo	San Pedro de Lloc	20	1.69	Miss La Libertad World	Top 12	Winner Talent Show	Miss Teen World Peru 2008	
2012	María Fernanda Obeso	Trujillo	-	-	Miss La Libertad Turismo	-	-	-	

^{1} Age at the time of the Miss La Libertad pageant

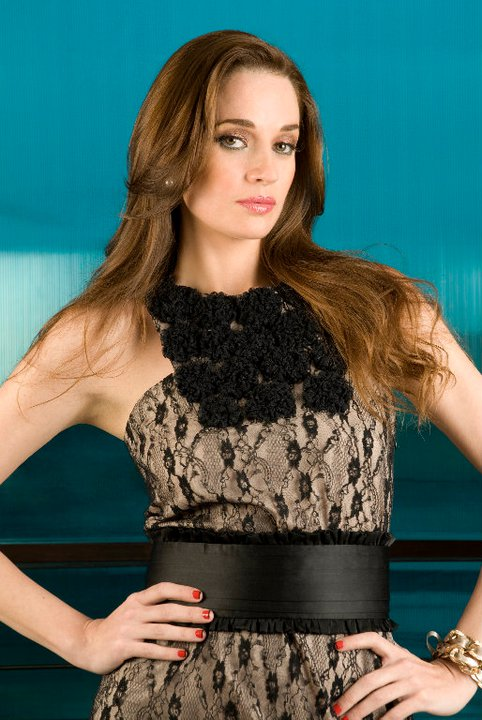
Mariana Larrabure de Orbegoso

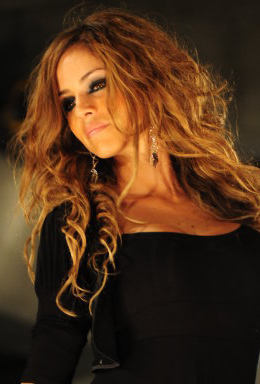
Maricris Rubio

== Gallery ==
Locations of Miss La Libertad contest
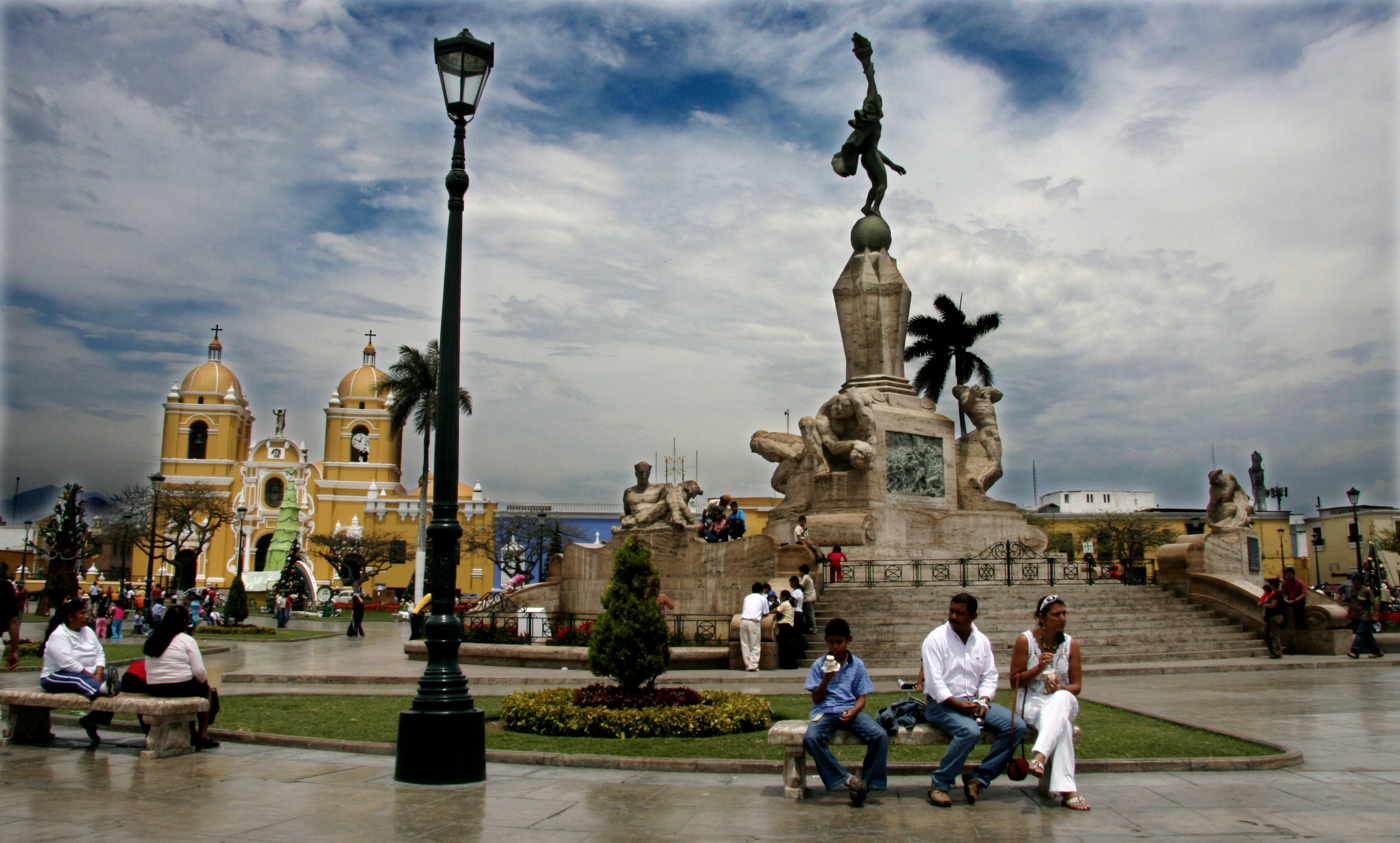
Plaza de Armas of Trujillo, Location of Miss La Libertad 2012

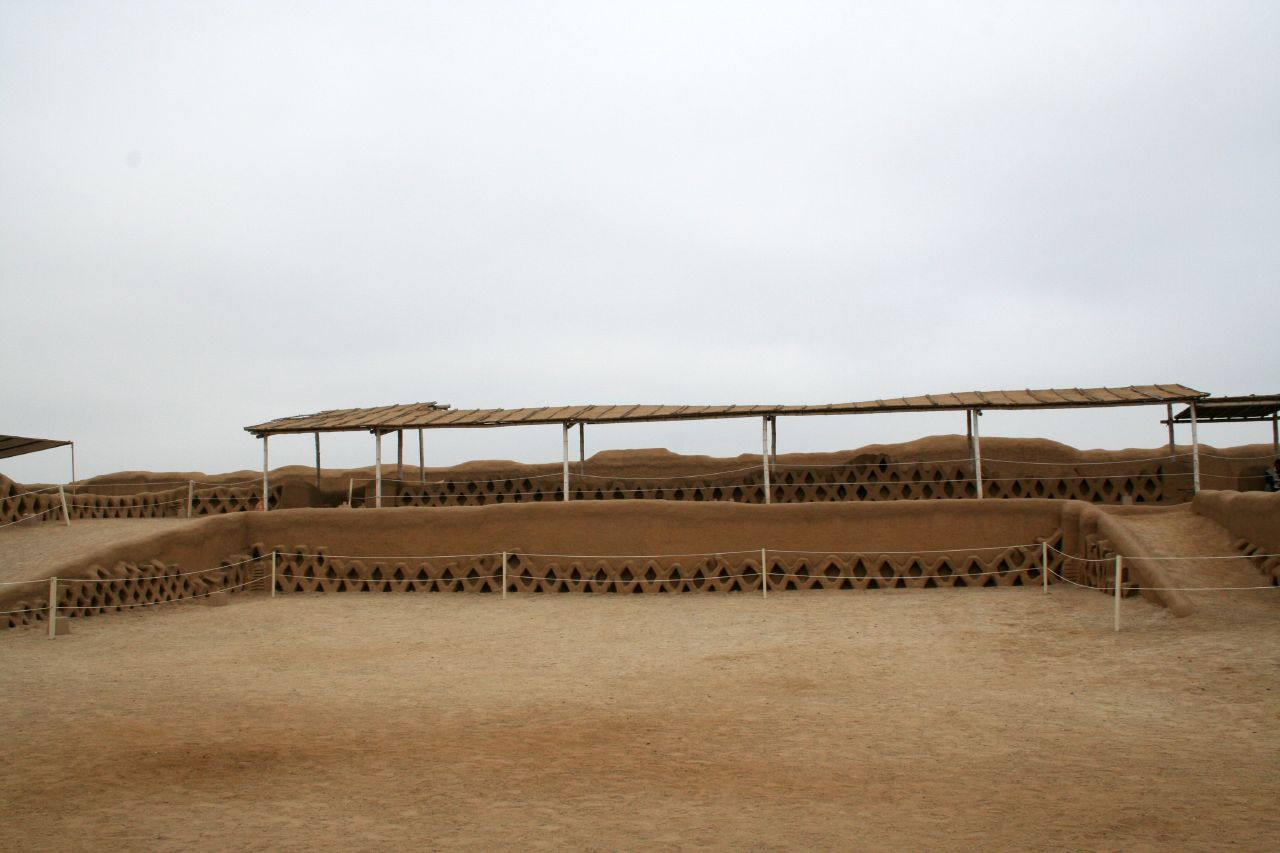
Chan Chan

== See also ==
- Trujillo Spring Festival
- San Jose Festival
- Trujillo Book Festival
- International Festival of Lyric Singing
- Trujillo
- Santiago de Huamán
- Victor Larco Herrera District
- Gastronomic Fair in Trujillo
