= Miss Perú Universo 2009 =

- Date: April 4, 2009
- Presenters: Gonzalo Iwasaki & Edith Tapia
- Venue: Hacienda Villa de Chorillos, Lima
- Broadcaster: Panamericana Televisión
- Entrants: 22
- Placements: 12
- Winner: Karen Schwarz Espinoza; Amazonas

The Miss Perú 2009 pageant was held on April 4, 2009. That year, 22 candidates were competing for the national crown. The chosen winner represented Peru in Miss Universe 2009. The rest of the finalists would enter in different pageants.

== Placements ==
Final Results	Contestant
Miss Peru Universe 2009	Amazonas - Karen Schwarz
Miss Supranational Peru 2009	Ancash - Gisella Cava
1st Runner-Up	Ayacucho - Jessica Schialer
2nd Runner-Up	Ica - Sofía del Pinho
Top 6	Huánuco - Carolina Gamarra; Loreto - Kory Alegría
Top 12	Cajamarca - Silvana Vásquez Monier; Tumbes - Kerly Acuna; Huancavelica - Bárbara Merino; Callao - Karla Flores; Cuzco - Vanessa Castillo; Puno - Dessire Villar

== Special awards ==
- Best Regional Costume - Puno - Dessire Villar
- Miss Photogenic - Huánuco- Carolina Gamarra
- Miss Elegance - Cajamarca - Silvana Vásquez Monier
- Miss Body - Amazonas - Karen Schwarz
- Best Hair - Ica - Sofía del Pinho
- Miss Congeniality - Junin - Alexandra Hidalgo
- Most Beautiful Face - Ica - Sofía del Pinho
- Best Smile - Huánuco- Carolina Gamarra
- Miss Aquavit - Tacna - Karen Menéndez

== Delegates ==
- Amazonas - Karen Susana Schwarz Espinoza
- Áncash - Gisella Dayana Cava Rivera
- Arequipa - Pamela Gonzáles Palomino
- Ayacucho - Jessica Schialer Brunetti
- Cajamarca - Silvana Sofía Vásquez Monier
- Callao - Karla Wendy Flores Guerra
- Cuzco - Vanessa Claudia Castillo Aranda
- Huancavelica - Bárbara Merino Ibañez
- Huánuco - Carolina Gamarra Calleja
- Ica - Sofía del Pinho
- Junín - Alexandra Hidalgo Schuster
- La Libertad - Pamela de la Flor Loly
- Lambayeque - Danea Panta
- Loreto - Kory Alegría
- Madre de Dios - Lilibeth Witting Ubaldo
- Pasco - Aymi Dean Carnero Dionisio
- Piura - Carol María Alvarado
- Puno - Dessire Villar Huamani
- Region Lima - Mayra Alejandra Chang Beltrán
- San Martín - Nancy Sánchez Sandoval
- Tacna - Karen Alicia Menéndez Calle
- Tumbes - Kerly Acuña Ramirez

== Judges ==
- Luisa María Cuculiza - Congressmember
- Fred Vellon - Creative Director of MAC cosmetics
- Jessica Tapia - TV Host & Miss Asia-Pacific 1994
- Luis Barrenechea - Plastic Surgeon
- Luis Argüelles - Manager of public relations of Panamericana Televisión
- Monica Chacón - Miss World Peru 1996
- Nacho del Águila - Professional Stylist of Tomy's
- Olga Zumarán - TV Actress & Miss Peru 1978

== Trivia ==
- Karen became the third Miss Amazonas to win that title since the Miss Peru pageant first began in 1952. The first one was Maria Esther Brambilla, Miss Peru 1968, and the other one was Paola Dellepiane Miss Peru 1995. Karen has German and Peruvian ancestry.
- Kori Alegría, Miss Loreto died on March 17, 2010, in a motorcycle accident in Iquitos.

== Background Music ==
- Opening Show – Eva Ayllón - "Enamorada de Estar Aqui"
- Swimsuit Competition – The Ting Tings - "Shut Up and Let Me Go"
- Evening Gown Competition – Jean Paul Strauss - "De Todo lo Mio"
