= Mariana Larrabure =

Peruvian beauty queen (born 1976)

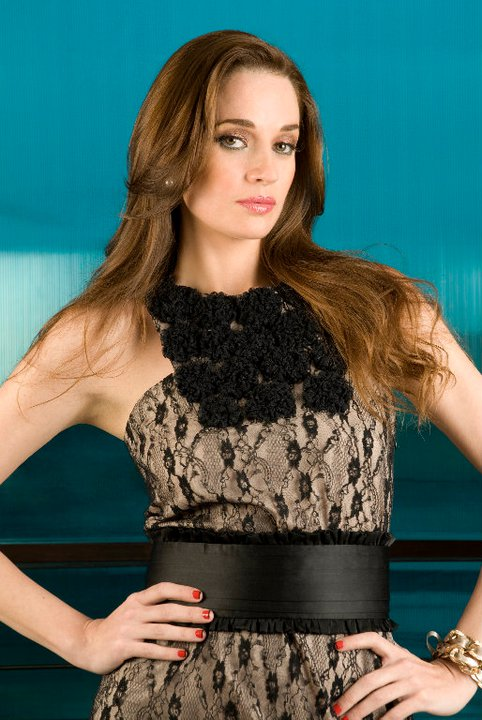
- Born: Mariana Larrabure de Orbegoso; May 2, 1976 (age 50); Trujillo, La Libertad, Peru
- Other name: Mariana Larrabure
- Height: 1.75 m (5 ft 9 in)
- Beauty pageant titleholder
- Hair color: Brown
- Eye color: Hazel
- Major competitions: Miss Perú Mundo 1998 (Winner); Miss World 1998 (Top 10)

Mariana Larrabure de Orbegoso is a Peruvian designer, model and beauty pageant titleholder who became "Miss Peru World" 1998 at the age of 22. She has also made a career in modeling in Peru.

== Personal life ==
Born in Lima city, Larrabure de Orbegoso became Miss Peru in 1998 representing to La Libertad Region with the title of Miss La Libertad in the Peruvian national contest. She was top 10 in Miss World 1999. Previously she started modeling at the early age of 14. She also studied to be a professional chef in Le Cordon Bleu Peru Culinary Arts School, she also attended courses of Graphic Design and went to Escuela Nacional Superior Autónoma de Bellas Artes to learn Painting and Sculpture. Mujer Peruana Interview

== See also ==
- Trujillo Spring Festival
- Miss La Libertad
- Miss Peru
