= Madre de Dios District =

Coordinates: 12.6166°S 70.3831°W

Madre de Dios
- District
- Location of Madre de Dios in Manú Province
- Country: Peru
- Region: Madre de Dios
- Province: Manú
- Founded: December 26, 1912
- Capital: Boca Colorado

Government
  - Mayor: Lorenzo Castillo Espino

Area
  - Total: 7,234.81 km^{2} (2,793.38 sq mi)
- Elevation: 240 m (790 ft)

Population (2005 census)
  - Total: 5,605
  - Density: 0.7747/km^{2} (2.007/sq mi)
- Time zone: UTC-5 (PET)
- UBIGEO: 170203

Madre de Dios District is one of four districts of Manú Province in Peru.
