= Miss Perú 1996 =

- Date: April 12, 1996
- Presenters: Omar Fierro & Cecilia Bolocco
- Venue: Teatro Municipal, Lima
- Broadcaster: América Televisión
- Entrants: 25
- Winner: Natalí Sacco; La Libertad

The Miss Perú 1996 pageant was held on April 12, 1996. That year, 25 candidates were competing for the national crown. The chosen winner represented Peru at the Miss Universe 1996. The rest of the finalists would enter in different pageants.

== Placements ==
| Final Results | Contestant |
|---|---|
| Miss Peru Universe 1996 | La Libertad - Natalí Sacco |
| 1st Runner-Up | Madre de Dios - Vanessa Saba |
| 2nd Runner-Up | Ancash - Fiorella Faré |
| 3rd Runner-Up | San Martín - Tatiana Vidaurre |
| 4th Runner-Up | Ica - Mariel Ocampo |
| 5th Runner-Up | Loreto - Pamela Lewis |
| Top 12 | Tacna - Colleen Ordoñez; Amazonas - Rochi Rubio; Puno - Cynthia Costa; Distrito Capital - Leonor Escudero; Ayacucho - Geraldine Salmón; Piura - Cecilia Martínez de Pinillos |

== Special awards ==
- Best Regional Costume - Amazonas - Rochi Rubio
- Miss Photogenic - Madre de Dios - Vanessa Saba
- Miss Elegance - Ancash - Fiorella Faré
- Miss Body - Amazonas - Rochi Rubio
- Best Hair - Ayacucho - Geraldine Salmón
- Miss Congeniality - San Martín - Tatiana Vidaurre
- Most Beautiful Face - Madre de Dios - Vanessa Saba

.

== Delegates ==
- Amazonas - Rochi Rubio
- Áncash - Fiorella Faré
- Apurímac - Fiorella Woll
- Arequipa - Tania Cassos
- Ayacucho - Geraldine Salmon
- Cajamarca - Sofía Durand
- Callao - Gilda Raymondi
- Cuzco - Ma. Eugenia Chávez
- Distrito Capital - Leonor Escudero
- Huancavelica - Claudia García
- Huánuco - Elizabeth Yep
- Ica - Mariel Ocampo
- Junín - Pamela Ugarte
- La Libertad - Natali Sacco
- Lambayeque - Giselle Avalos
- Loreto - Pamela Lewis
- Madre de Dios - Vanessa Saba
- Moquegua - Roxana León
- Pasco - Silvina Corbitz
- Piura - Cecilia Martínez de Pinillos
- Puno - Cynthia Costa
- San Martín - Tatiana Vidaurre
- Tacna - Colleen Ordoñez
- Tumbes - Antoinette Coronado
- Ucayali - Erika Lodwic

.

== Miss World Peru ==
The Miss World Peru 1996 pageant was held on March 31, 1996, That year, 54 candidates from different districts, cities and regions of Peru and the private clubs and Peruvian associations overseas were competing for the national crown. The first cut to a Top 24 was chosen on March 17, in a previous show host by Antonio Vodanovic and Jessica Newton, both events were a live broadcast by ATV. The chosen winner represented Peru at Miss World 1996. The rest of the finalists would enter in different pageants.

== Placements ==
| Final Results | Contestant |
|---|---|
| Miss World Peru 1996 | Iquitos - Mónica Chacón D’Vettori |
| Miss Peru Latina 1996 | Manú - Ericka Ramirez |
| 1st Runner-Up | Huancayo - Regina Vurbal |
| 2nd Runner-Up | San Martín - Fairus Barraza |
| 3rd Runner-Up | Madre de Dios - Renata Troiano |
| 4th Runner-Up | Ica - Rosa Maria Guadalupe Lara |
| Top 12 | Pisco - Silvia Rodriguez; Apurímac - Patricia Alarcon; Tingo María - Mirela Astolfi; Ayacucho - Yvette Ojeda; Amazonas - Sandra Salazar; Puerto de Ilo - Jennifer Fon |

== MWP Special Awards ==
- Miss Photogenic - Iquitos - Mónica Chacón D’Vettori
- Miss Fitness - Iquitos - Mónica Chacón D’Vettori
- Miss Elegance - Puerto de Ilo - Jennifer Fon
- Miss Congeniality - Huaraz - Katicsa Kovacs
- Miss Body - Pisco - Silvia Rodriguez
- Most Beautiful Face - San Martín - Fairus Barraza

== MWP Delegates ==
- Amazonas - Sandra salazar
- Áncash - Claudia Barbi
- Apurímac - Patricia Alarcon
- Ayacucho - Yvette Ojeda
- Callao - Julissa Gonzales
- Chiclayo - Susana Paredes Cueva
- Cuzco - Jenny Palacios Tapia
- Huancayo - Regina Vurbal
- Huaraz - Katicsa Kovacs
- Ica - Rosa Maria Guadalupe Lara
- Iquitos - Mónica Chacón D’Vettori
- Lambayeque - Giuliana Leguia
- Loreto - Helly Calvo-Zegarra
- Machu Picchu - Urzula Zevallos
- Madre de Dios - Renata Troiano
- Manu - Ericka Ramirez
- Pasco - Susana Maruy
- Pisco - Silvia Rodriguez
- Pucallpa - Ana Lucia Melendez
- Puerto de Ilo - Jennifer Fon
- Region Lima - Guiliana Armas
- San Martín - Fairus Barraza
- Tingo María - Mirela Astolfi
- Trujillo - Paola Aris

== MWP Judges ==
- Gustavo Rubio - Representative of the Miss World Org.
- Jackeline Aguilera - Miss World 1995
- Carlos Morales - Public Relations Manager of Grupo D' elite
- Osmel Sousa - President of the Miss Venezuela Org.
- Acirema Alayeto - President of the Miss Latin America Org.
- Moon Hym Kim - Representative of Daewoo Motors
- Raul Romero - Peruvian Singer & TV Host
- Nuria Puig - Mrs. Peru 1995
- Leandro Chiok Chang - Executive President of Americana de Aviacion
- María Elena Bellido - Miss Latin America 1991
- Dr. Max Álvarez - Plastic Surgeon

== MWP Special Guests Singers ==
  - Paco de Lucía - "Fina Estampa"
  - Cecilia Bracamonte - "La Veguera"
  - Braulio - "En Bancarrota" & "Si Me Quieres Matar"

.
