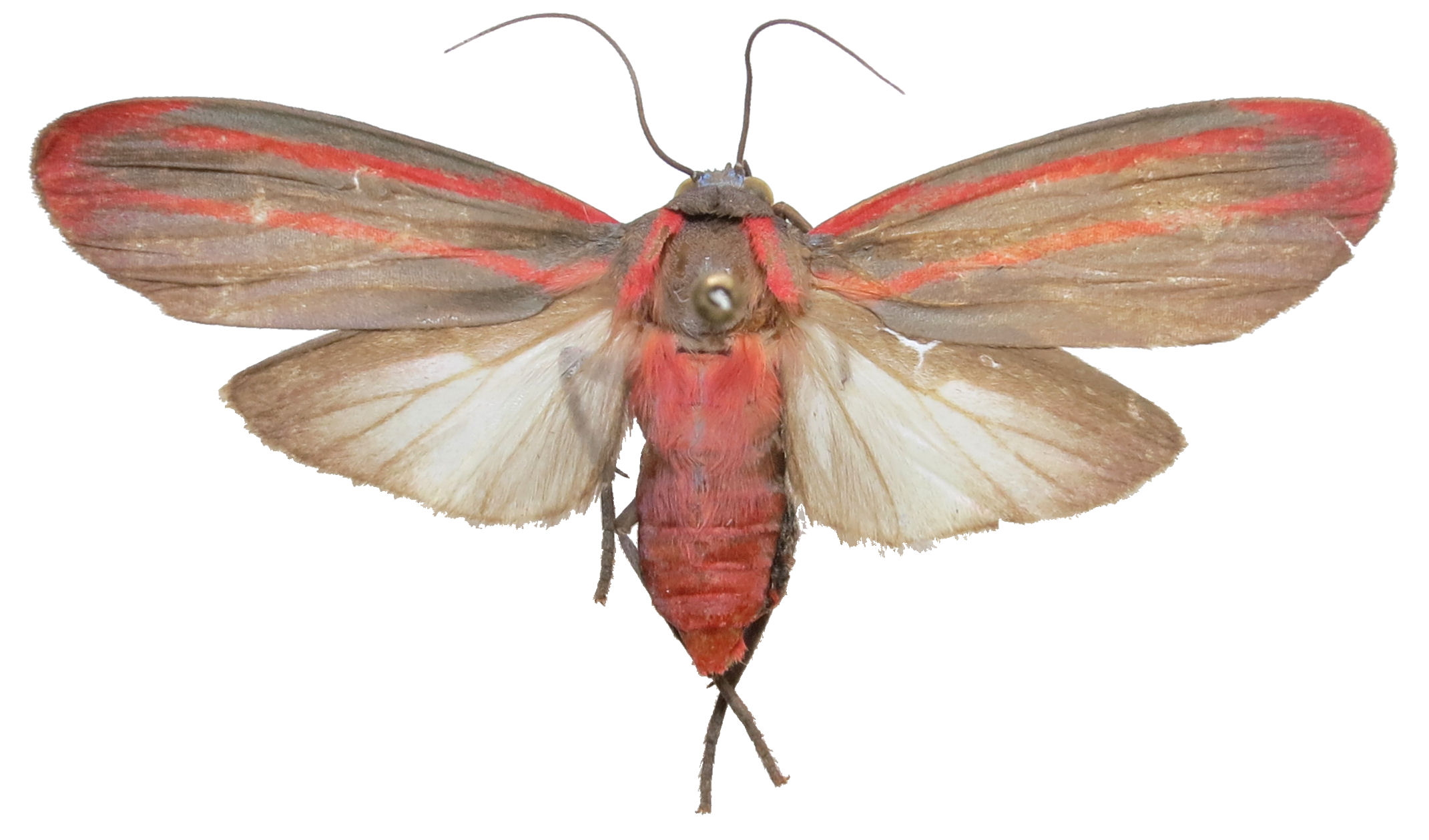
- From Salvación, Peru

Scientific classification
- Kingdom: Animalia
- Phylum: Arthropoda
- Class: Insecta
- Order: Lepidoptera
- Superfamily: Noctuoidea
- Family: Erebidae
- Subfamily: Arctiinae
- Genus: Cissura
- Species: C. decora

Binomial name
- Cissura decora Walker, 1854

Synonyms
- Cissura decora Walker, 1854; Cratosia parallela Felder, 1874

= Cissura decora =

Species of moth

Cissura decora is a moth of the family Erebidae first described by Francis Walker in 1854. It is found in Brazil.
