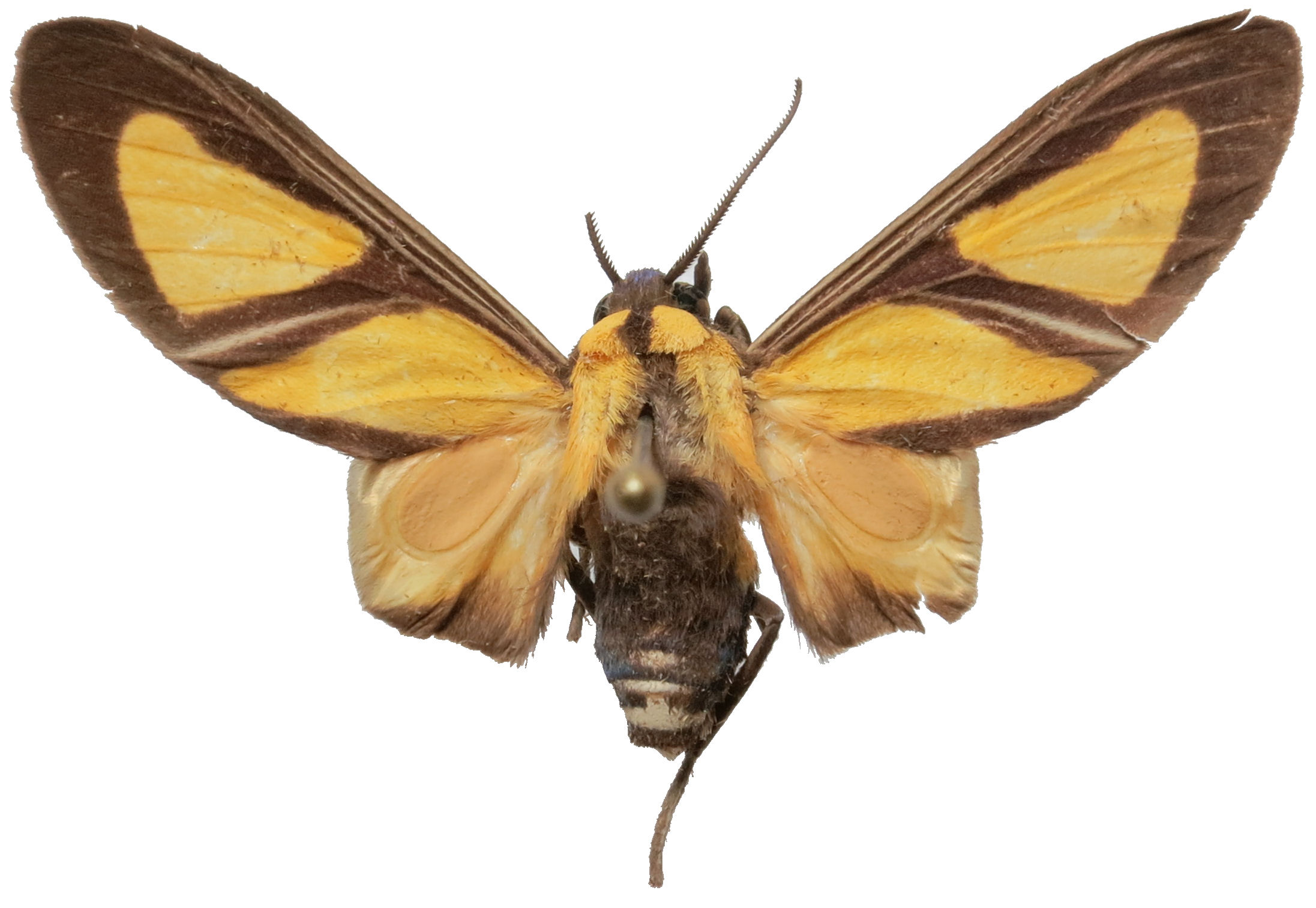
- X.pseudameoides from Salvacion, Manu - Madre de Dios - Peru

Scientific classification
- Domain: Eukaryota
- Kingdom: Animalia
- Phylum: Arthropoda
- Class: Insecta
- Order: Lepidoptera
- Superfamily: Noctuoidea
- Family: Erebidae
- Subfamily: Arctiinae
- Genus: Xanthoarctia
- Species: X. pseudameoides

Binomial name
- Xanthoarctia pseudameoides (Rothschild, 1909)

Synonyms
- Automolis pseudameoides Rothschild, 1909

= Xanthoarctia pseudameoides =

Species of moth

Xanthoarctia pseudameoides is a moth in the family Erebidae first described by Walter Rothschild in 1909. It is found in French Guiana, Amazonas, Venezuela and Peru.
