= Manu District =

Coordinates: 12.2637°S 70.9095°W

Manu
- District
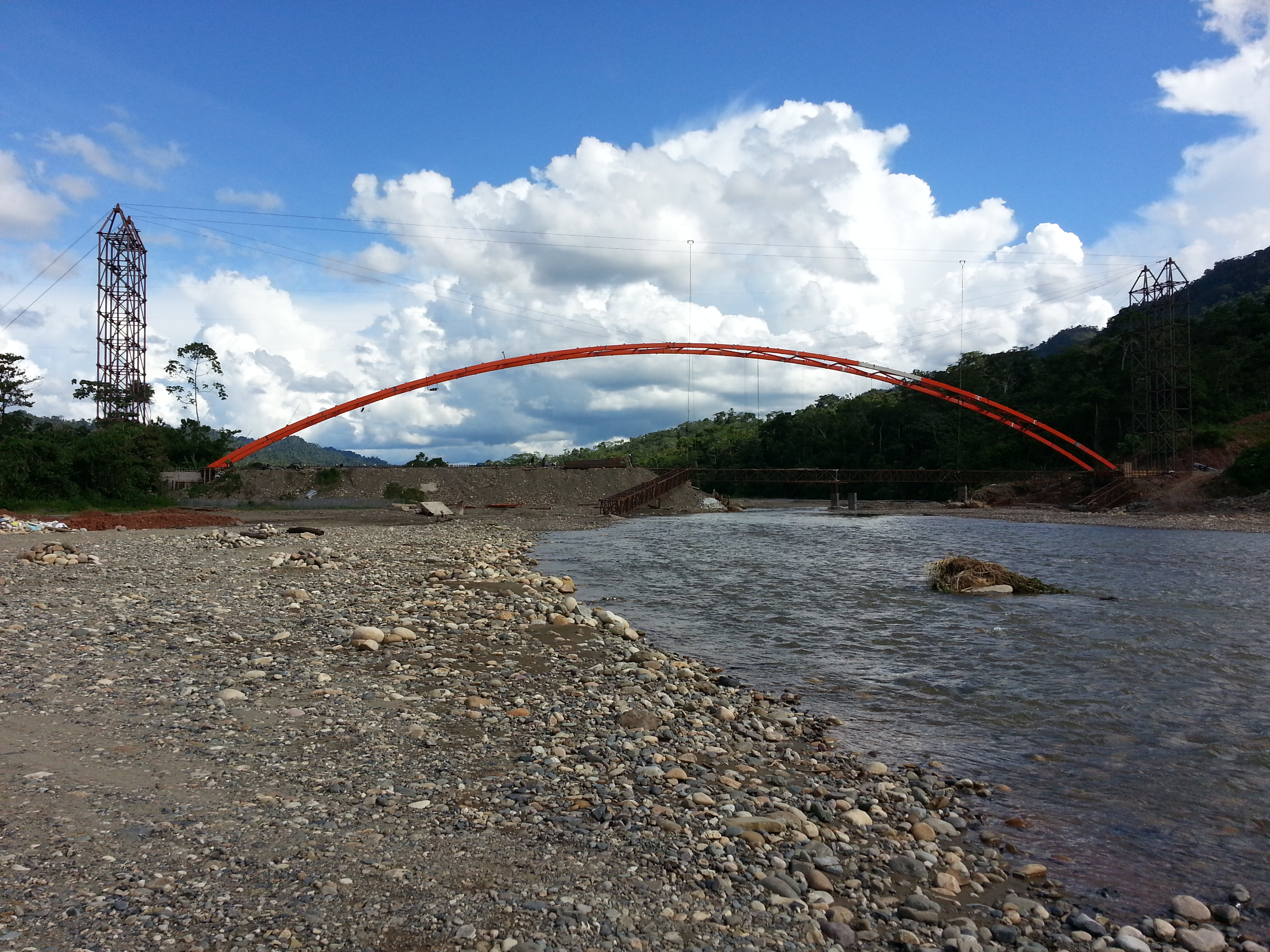

- Location of Manu in Manu Province
- Country: Peru
- Region: Madre de Dios
- Province: Manu
- Founded: December 26, 1912
- Capital: Salvación

Government
  - Mayor: Flavio Americo Hurtado León

Area
  - Total: 8,166.65 km^{2} (3,153.16 sq mi)
- Elevation: 550 m (1,800 ft)

Population (2005 census)
  - Total: 2,302
  - Density: 0.2819/km^{2} (0.7301/sq mi)
- Time zone: UTC-5 (PET)
- UBIGEO: 170201

Manu District is one of four districts of Manu Province in Peru.
