= Fitzcarrald District =

Coordinates: 12.9344°S 70.9336°W

Fitzcarrald
- District
- Location of Fitzcarrald in Manú Province
- Country: Peru
- Region: Madre de Dios
- Province: Manú
- Founded: December 26, 1912
- Capital: Boca Manú

Government
  - Mayor: Walter Misael Mancilla Huaman

Area
  - Total: 10,955.3 km^{2} (4,229.9 sq mi)
- Elevation: 330 m (1,080 ft)

Population (2005 census)
  - Total: 1,062
  - Density: 0.09694/km^{2} (0.2511/sq mi)
- Time zone: UTC-5 (PET)
- UBIGEO: 170202

Fitzcarrald District is one of four districts of Manú Province in Peru.
