= Cissura =

Scientific classification
- Kingdom: Animalia
- Phylum: Arthropoda
- Class: Insecta
- Order: Lepidoptera
- Superfamily: Noctuoidea
- Family: Erebidae
- Subfamily: Arctiinae
- Tribe: Arctiini
- Subtribe: Phaegopterina
- Genus: Cissura; Walker, 1854

Type species
- Cissura decora

Synonyms
- Cratosia Felder, 1874

Genus of moths

Cissura is a genus of moths in the family Erebidae. The genus was erected by Francis Walker in 1854.

== Species ==
- Cissura bilineata
- Cissura decora
- Cissura plumbea
- Cissura unilineata
