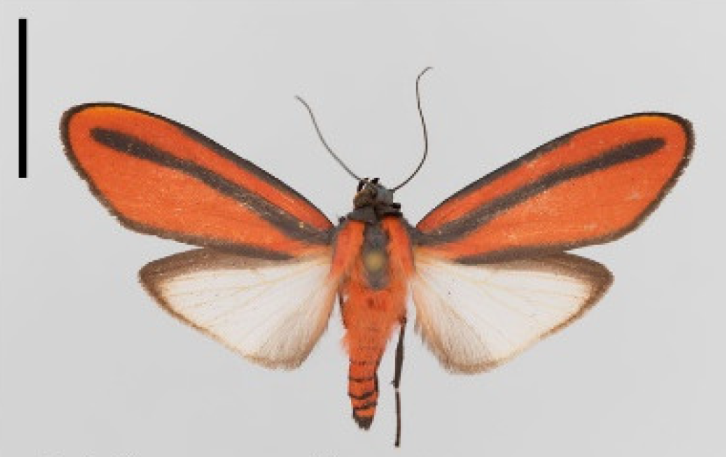

Scientific classification
- Domain: Eukaryota
- Kingdom: Animalia
- Phylum: Arthropoda
- Class: Insecta
- Order: Lepidoptera
- Superfamily: Noctuoidea
- Family: Erebidae
- Subfamily: Arctiinae
- Genus: Cissura
- Species: C. unilineata

Binomial name
- Cissura unilineata (Dognin, 1891)

Synonyms
- Cratosia unilineata Dognin, 1891

= Cissura unilineata =

Species of moth

Cissura unilineata is a moth of the subfamily Arctiinae first described by Paul Dognin in 1891. It is found in Ecuador and Peru.
