= Miss Perú 2006 =

- Date: April 19, 2006
- Presenters: Marcelo Oxenford & Adriana Quevedo
- Venue: Park of the Exposition
- Broadcaster: Panamericana Televisión
- Entrants: 24
- Winner: Fiorella Viñas; Lambayeque

The Miss Perú 2006 was held on April 19, 2006. That year, only 24 candidates were competing for the national crown. The chosen winner represented Peru at the Miss Universe 2006. The Miss Earth Perú would enter in Miss Earth 2006.

== Placements ==
Final Results	Contestant	Result International
Miss Peru Universe 2006	Lambayeque - Fiorella Viñas	I don't classify
Miss Earth Peru 2006	Ancash - Valery Neff	I don't classify
1st Runner-Up	Loreto - Verónica Navarrete	
2nd Runner-Up	San Martín - Paola Merea	
3rd Runner-Up	Region Lima - Cinthia Vidaurre	
4th Runner-Up	Junín - Odilia Garcia	
Top 12	Arequipa - Giulliana Cateriano; Ucayali - Rosalinda Aliaga; Ayacucho - Patricia Ríos; Huánuco - Joana Arévalo; Amazonas - Verónica Tamashiro; Pasco - Alice Raschio	

== Special awards ==
- Best Regional Costume - Loreto - Verónica Navarrete
- Miss Photogenic - Arequipa - Giulliana Cateriano
- Miss Elegance - Pasco - Alice Raschio
- Miss Body - Loreto - Verónica Navarrete
- Best Hair - Junín - Odilia García
- Miss Congeniality - Huancavelica - Mayra Chang
- Most Beautiful Face - San Martín - Paola Merea
- Best Smile - Callao - Graciela Mc Evoy
- Miss Internet - Loreto - Verónica Navarrete

== Delegates ==
- Amazonas - Verónica Tamashiro
- Áncash - Valery Caroline Neff
- Apurímac - Guisella Valencia
- Arequipa - Giulliana Cateriano
- Ayacucho - Patricia Ríos
- Cajamarca - Stefanía Gutiérrez
- Callao - Graciela McEvoy
- Cuzco - Alia Sumar
- Huancavelica - Mayra Chang
- Huánuco - Joana Arévalo
- Ica - Ana Laura Oliva
- Junín - Odilia Pamela García
- Lambayeque - Fiorella Viñas
- Loreto - Veronica Navarrete
- Madre de Dios - Carla River
- Moquegua - María Elena Mercado
- Pasco - Alice Raschio
- Piura - Priscilla Zapata
- Puno - Patricia del Castillo
- Region Lima - Cinthia Vidaurre
- San Martín - Paola Merea
- Tacna - Fiorella Sofía Luna
- Tumbes - Milagros Márquez
- Ucayali - Rosalinda Aliaga

== Background Music ==
- Opening Show – Eva Ayllón - "Morropón de San Miguel"
- Swimsuit Competition – Marisela - "Quizas, Quizas, Quizas"
- Evening Gown Competition – Michael Bolton - "Once In A Lifetime"

== Miss World Peru ==
The Miss World Peru 2006 pageant was held on June 18, 2006, That year, 23 candidates from different regions of Peru were competing for the national crown. The show host by Jorge Belevan and Claudia Hernandez Ore, The event were a live broadcast by Panamericana Television.

The chosen winner represented Peru at Miss World 2006. The rest of the finalists would enter in different pageants.

== Placements ==
Final Results	Contestant
Miss World Peru 2006	La Libertad - Silvia Cornejo
1st Runner-Up	San Martín - Dayari Tejada
2nd Runner-Up	Lambayeque - Brenda Aguirre
3rd Runner-Up	Piura - Maria Cristina Montenegro
4th Runner-Up	Ucayali - Dulcinea Prado
5th Runner-Up	Tacna - Macarena Flores
Top 12	Distrito Capital - Sully Saenz; Puno - Karla Chavez; Ancash - Cecilia Gamarra; Tumbes - Cynthia Chanta; Callao - Alexandra Carreras; Arequipa - Vanessa Tejada

== MWP Special Awards ==
- Most Beautiful Face - Lambayeque - Brenda Aguirre
- Miss Congeniality - Apurímac - Maria Greta Deza
- Best Dress Designer Award - La Libertad - Silvia Cornejo
- Best Model - San Martín - Dayari Tejada

== MWP Delegates ==
- Amazonas - Viviana Guerrero
- Áncash - Cecilia Gamarra
- Apurímac - Maria Greta Deza
- Arequipa - Vanessa Tejada
- Ayacucho - Claudia Banda
- Cajamarca - Liliana Marcos
- Callao - Alexandra Carreras
- Cuzco - Claudia Carrasco
- Distrito Capital - Sully Saenz
- Huancavelica - Mayra Farje
- Huánuco - Paricia Mia Verand
- Junín - Silvana Lizarburu
- La Libertad - Silvia Cornejo
- Loreto - Cynthia Diaz elegida como Miss Loreto 2005
- Lambayeque - Brenda Aguirre
- Madre de Dios - Eva Maria Becerra
- Moquegua - Jennifer Loayza
- Pasco - Amy Franco
- Piura - Maria Cristina Montenegro
- Puno - Karla Chavez
- San Martín - Dayari Tejada
- Tacna - Macarena Flores
- Tumbes - Cynthia Chanta
- Ucayali - Dulcinea Prado
