= Miss Perú 1968 =

Peruvian beauty pageant in 1968

- Date: June 19, 1968
- Presenters: Pepe Ludmir
- Venue: Teatro Municipal (Lima)
- Entrants: 21
- Winner: María Esther Brambilla; Amazonas

The Miss Perú 1968 pageant was held on June 19, 1968. That year, 21 candidates were competing for the national crown. The chosen winners represented Peru at the Miss Universe 1968, and Miss World 1968. The rest of the finalists would enter in different pageants.

== Placements ==
Final Results	Contestant
Miss Peru Universe 1968	Amazonas - María Esther Brambilla
Miss World Peru 1968	Europe Perú - Ana Rosa Berninzon Devéscovi
1st Runner-Up	Junín - Carmen Alegría
2nd Runner-Up	Region Lima - Bertha Arias
Top 8	Tacna - Nelly Amiel; Cuzco - Luz Renee Chávez; Tumbes - Gloria Esquivel; Moquegua - Inés García Calderón

== Special awards ==
- Best Regional Costume - Lambayeque - Alicia Rodriguez Meza
- Miss Photogenic - Europe Perú - Ana Rosa Berninzon
- Miss Congeniality - Áncash - Jaqueline Rosales
- Miss Elegance - Region Lima - Bertha Arias

.

== Delegates ==
- Amazonas - María Esther Brambilla
- Áncash - Jaqueline Rosales
- Apurímac - Rosa Maria Santolaya
- Ayacucho - Noelia Ruiz Rojas
- Cuzco - Luz Renee Chávez
- Distrito Capital - Cordelia Minetti
- Europe Perú - Ana Rosa Berninzon Devéscovi
- Huánuco - Ana Patrica Escalante
- Ica - Maria Isabel Uribe
- Junín - Carmen Alegría
- Lambayeque - Alicia Rodriguez Meza
- Loreto - Candelaria Rivera
- Madre de Dios - Angela Manrique
- Moquegua - Inés García Calderón
- Pasco - Melissa Saldarriaga
- Puno - Rosario Salazar
- Region Lima - Bertha Arias
- San Martín - Rebeca Requena
- Tacna - Nelly Amiel
- Tumbes - Gloria Esquivel
- USA Perú - Jazmine Watkins

.
