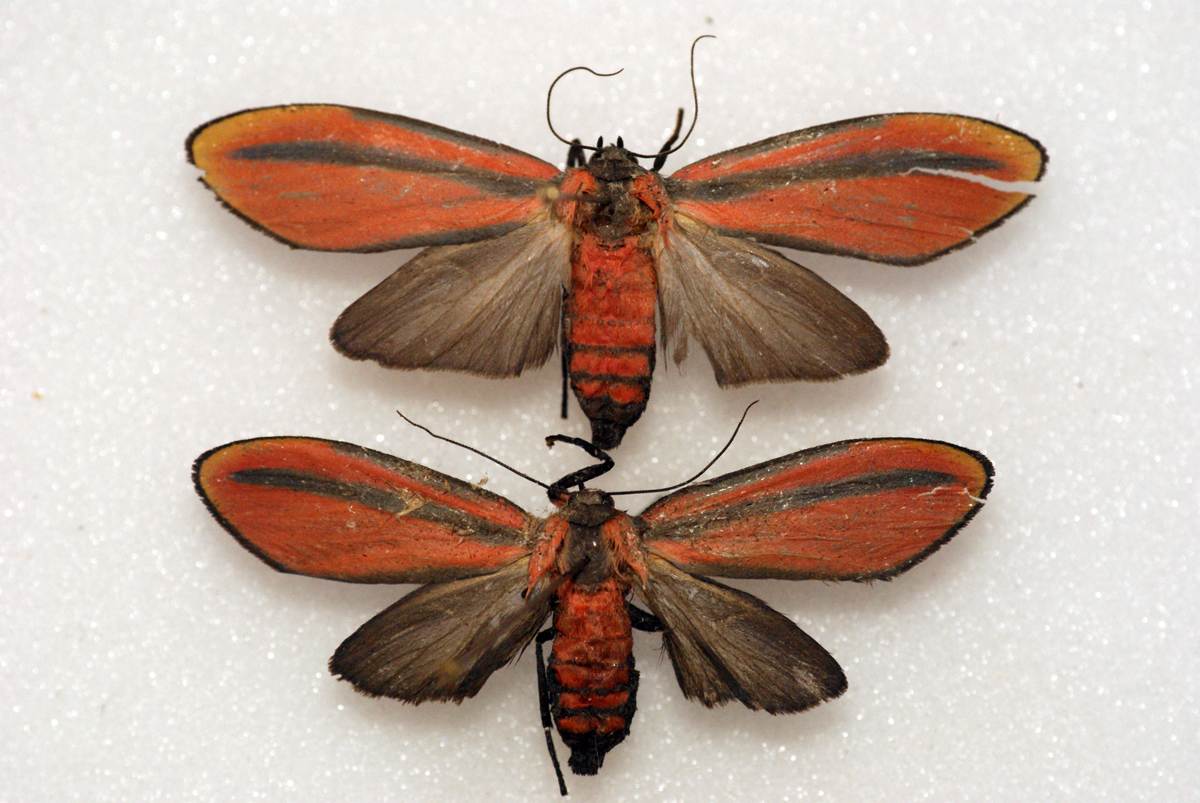

Scientific classification
- Kingdom: Animalia
- Phylum: Arthropoda
- Class: Insecta
- Order: Lepidoptera
- Superfamily: Noctuoidea
- Family: Erebidae
- Subfamily: Arctiinae
- Genus: Cissura
- Species: C. plumbea

Binomial name
- Cissura plumbea Hampson, 1901

Synonyms
- Cissura excelsior Rothschild, 1933

= Cissura plumbea =

Species of moth

Cissura plumbea is a moth of the family Erebidae first described by George Hampson in 1901. It is found in Honduras, Belize, Peru and Bolivia.

== Subspecies ==
- Cissura plumbea plumbea (Belize)
- Cissura plumbea excelsior Rothschild, 1933 (Peru)
