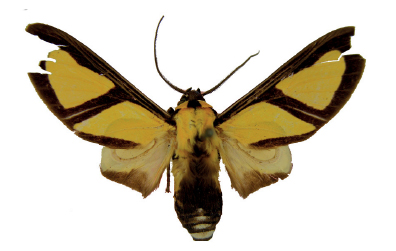

Scientific classification
- Kingdom: Animalia
- Phylum: Arthropoda
- Class: Insecta
- Order: Lepidoptera
- Superfamily: Noctuoidea
- Family: Erebidae
- Subfamily: Arctiinae
- Subtribe: Phaegopterina
- Genus: Xanthoarctia; Travassos, 1951

= Xanthoarctia =

Genus of moths

Xanthoarctia is a genus of moths in the family Erebidae.

== Species ==
- Xanthoarctia pseudameoides
