= Madre de Dios River =

River in Peru and Bolivia

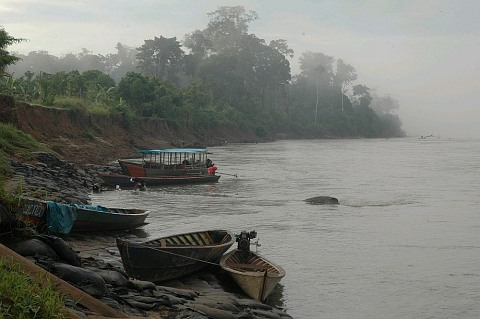
- Madre de Dios near Boca Manu town, Peru

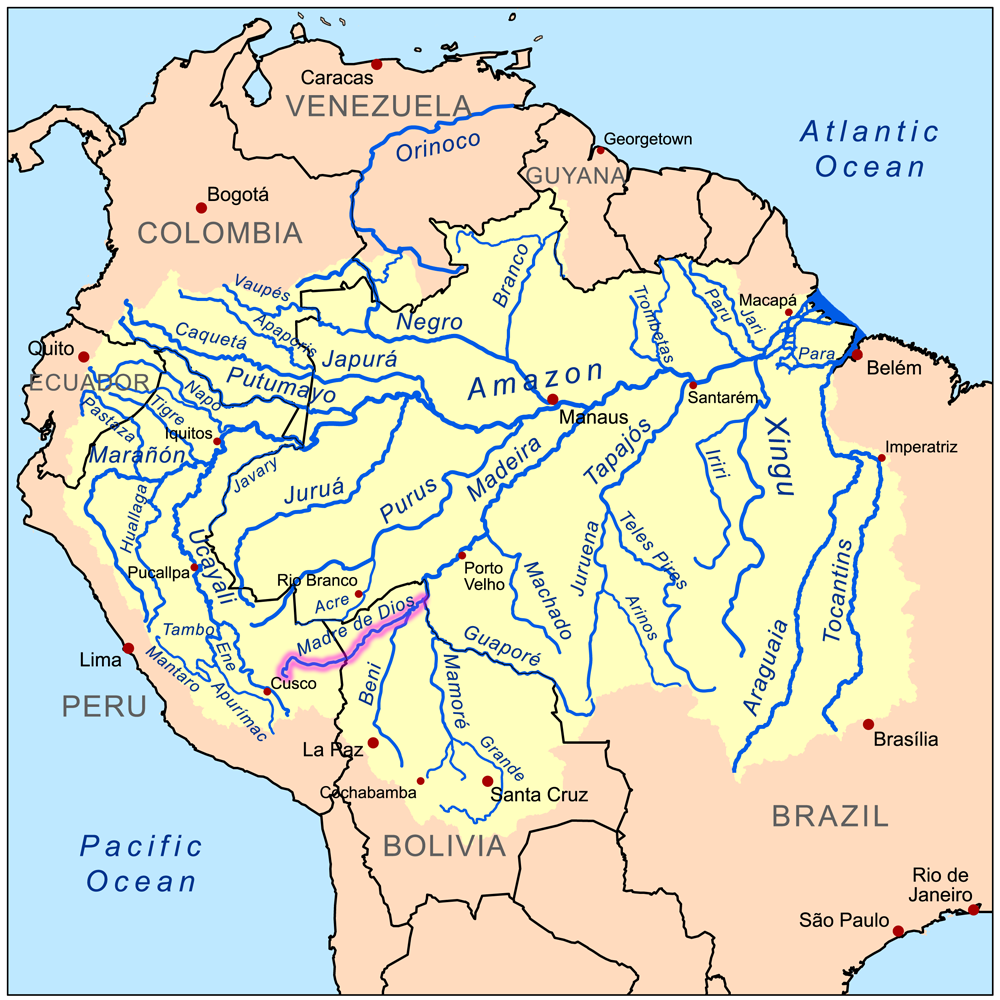
- The Amazon Basin with the Madre de Dios River highlighted

Location
- Country: Bolivia, Peru

Physical characteristics
- Source
  - location: Cordillera Vilcanota, Peru
  - coordinates: 12°53′17.0808″S 71°21′36.1944″W
- Mouth: Madeira River
  - location: Villa Bella, Beni, Bolivia
  - coordinates: 10°22′53.1156″S 65°23′28.9968″W
  - elevation: 105 m (344 ft)
- Length: 1,347 km (837 mi)
- Basin size: 281,000 km^{2} (108,000 sq mi) to 310,000 km^{2} (120,000 mi^{2})
- Discharge
  - location: Near mouth
  - average: (Period: 1985–2013)9,350 m^{3}/s (330,000 cu ft/s) (Period: 1973–1990)10,140 m^{3}/s (358,000 cu ft/s)
  - minimum: 2,970 m^{3}/s (105,000 cu ft/s)
  - maximum: 17,800 m^{3}/s (630,000 cu ft/s)
- Discharge
  - location: Miraflores–El Sena
  - average: (Period: 1985–2013)5,800 m^{3}/s (200,000 cu ft/s)
  - minimum: 2,250 m^{3}/s (79,000 cu ft/s)
  - maximum: 10,300 m^{3}/s (360,000 cu ft/s)

Basin features
- Progression: Madeira → Amazon → Atlantic Ocean
- River system: Amazon
- Tributaries
  - left: Manu, Los Amigos, Las Piedras, Orthon
  - right: Chivile, Azul, Colorado, Inambari, Tambopata, Heath, Beni

The Madre de Dios River (Spanish pronunciation: [ˈmaðɾe ðe ðjos]) is a river shared by Bolivia and Peru which is homonymous to the Peruvian region it runs through. On Bolivian territory, it receives the Beni River, close to the town of Riberalta, which later joins with the Mamore River to become the Madeira River after the confluence. The Madeira is a tributary to the Amazon River.

The Madre de Dios is an important waterway for the department of Madre de Dios, particularly Puerto Maldonado, the largest town in the area, and the capital of the department. Mango farming and gold mining are among the many industries on its banks. Other important industries the Madre de Dios provides are selective logging and farming, both of which are serious environmental problems. Along the length of the river, there are several national parks and reserves, notably Tambopata-Candamo National Park, Manu National Park (also known as Manu Biosphere Reserve) and Bahuaja-Sonene National Park.

Illegal gold mining along the Madre de Dios River has been identified as a pressure on the nearby Área Natural de Manejo Integrado El Gran Manupare in Pando, a protected area supported by Conservation International Bolivia.

== Hydrography ==
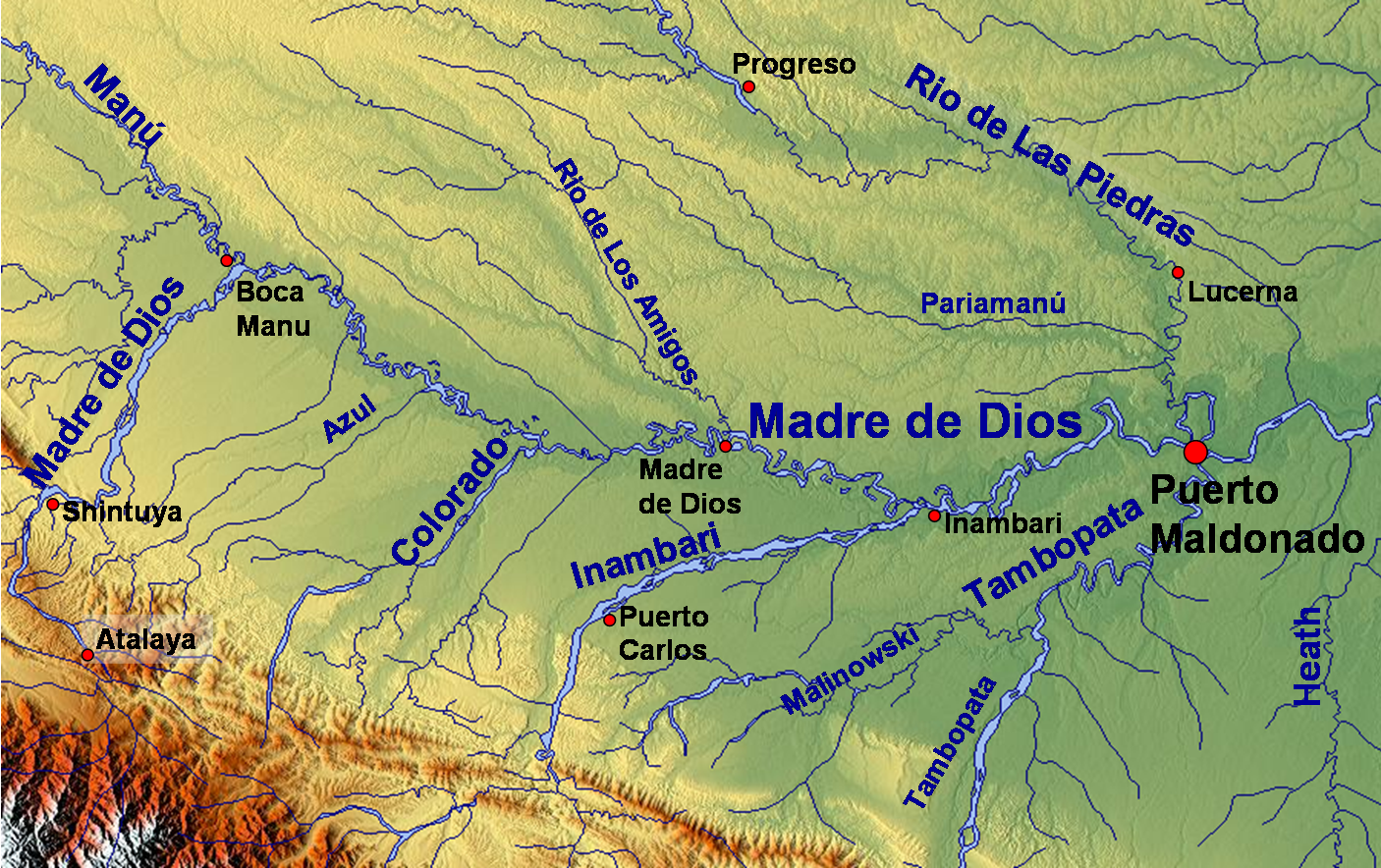
The upper Madre de Dios River and its main tributaries upstream from Puerto Maldonado

The Madre de Dios serves as the largest watershed in the area, as part of the vast Amazon River watershed. The river's main tributaries include on the right: Chivile, Azul, Blanco, Inambari, Tambopata and Colorado rivers and from the left: Los Amigos, Manu, and Las Piedras.

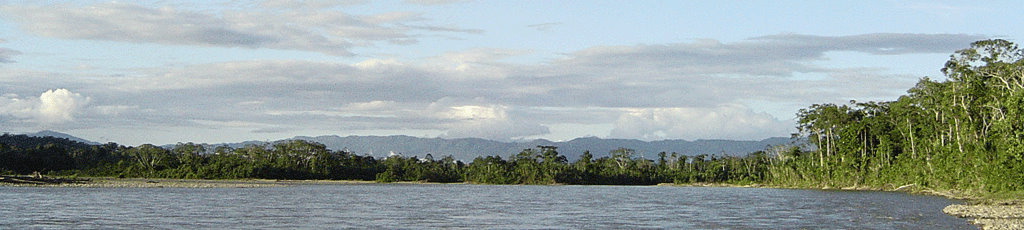
The Alto Madre de Dios River from the Fundo Mascoitania Reserve

== Rubber boom ==
The first Amazon rubber boom promoted a new wave of colonization along the Peruvian and Bolivian sides of the Madre de Dios River. Around 1881, one of the most prominent Bolivian migrants to the region, Nicolás Suárez Callaú, established a rubber producing estate at the Mamoré River's confluence with the Madeira River. This confluence presented a major impediment to fluvial transportation due to the presence of rapids, locally referred to as cachuelas. Suárez decided to name his estate Cachuela Esperanza, he also developed a short portage route on the estate to circumnavigate the cachuelas.

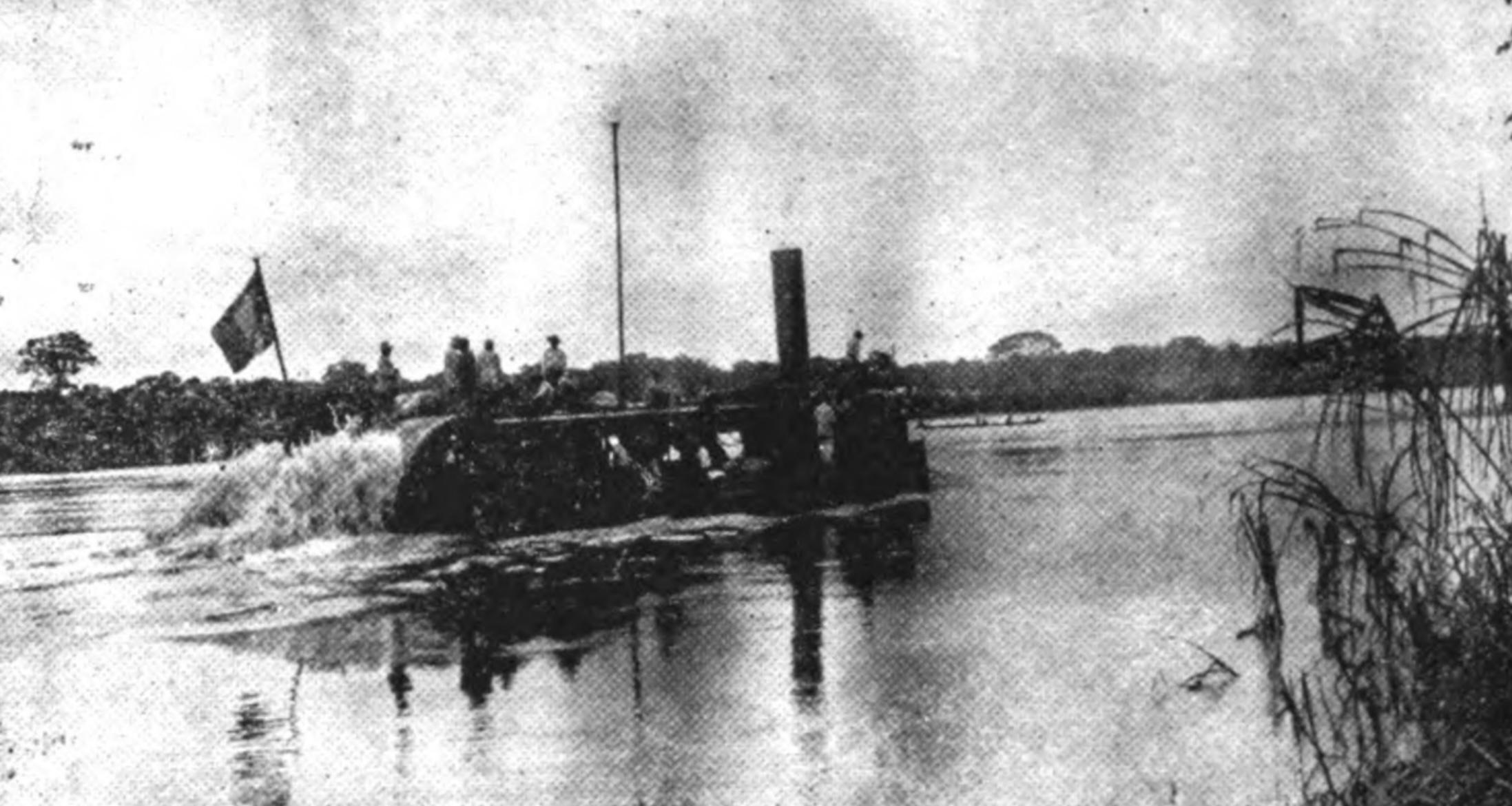
The steamship Inambari of the Casa Rodriguez on the Madre de Dios River. (Note: At Port Maldonado is the confluence of the Tambopata River with the Madre de Dios, and farther upstream is the Inambari River. The whole of this region is rich in rubber forests, and several companies are engaged in rubber-gathering, including British, American, Bolivian, and Peruvian.")

Peruvian activity in the Madre de Dios River basin began in 1894 after the Peruvian Rubber baron Carlos Fitzcarrald's first portage trip across the Isthmus of Fitzcarrald. This isthmus connected the Manu tributary of Madre de Dios with the Urubamba tributary of the Ucayali River, an area which was largely under Fitzcarrald's influence. Fitzcarrald's enterprise was dependent on enslaved indigenous populations consisting of Asháninka, Cashibo, Shipibo, Piro and later Harakbut tribes from the Manu River basin. Both Fitzcarrald's and Suarez's enterprises organized correrias or slave raids against indigenous populations in the Madre de Dios River valley. In the words of Yesica Patiachi, a Harakbut educator, "[f]or the Harakbut, Fitzcarrald, discoverer of the isthmus that enabled river access to the Madre de Dios basin from the northern Amazon, caused the greatest genocide of all time: on one day alone, 3,000 Harakbut were murdered, turning the rivers of our territory red”.

The nefarious period of the rubber boom in Madre de Dios (1900-1940) and its harmful consequences must be taken into account. Firstly, as has already been noted, this was a very specific economic activity, undertaken in collusion with the Peruvian State which resulted in an unprecedented genocide of the region’s indigenous population, primarily men and women of the Matsigenka, Aramkbut (now Harakbut) and Ese Eja nations. According to reports that bear witness to the demography of the area, there were an estimated 30,000 Harakbut living in the forests of what are now Manu and Paucartambo provinces in the years leading up to the rubber boom in the southern Amazon. By the end of this period, their numbers had been reduced by 90%. The slavery these people were subjected to and the epidemics caused by forced contact with the rubber workers and other indigenous peoples, who were also brought forcibly from other regions of the Amazon, led the Harakbut to the verge of extinction.

— Guillermo Reaño, Peru: Deforestation in Times of Climate Change

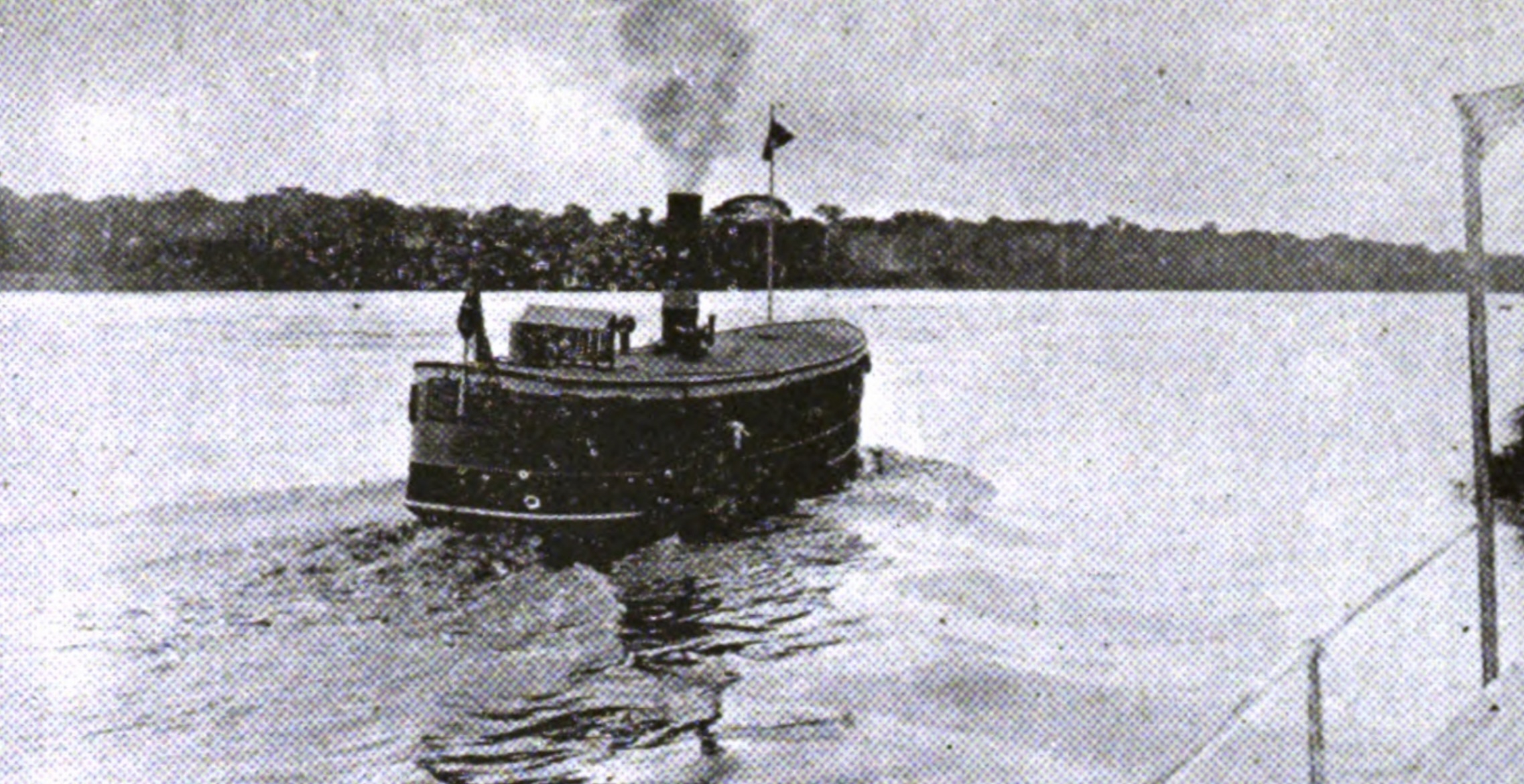
Steamship Madre de Dios, photographed at Puerto Maldonado..

== Bibliography ==
- Chirif, Alberto; Reaño, Guillermo (2019). Peru: Deforestation in Times of Climate Change. The International Work Group for Indigenous Affairs.
- Fifer, Valerie (1970). "The Empire Builders: A History of the Bolivian Rubber Boom and the Rise of the House of Suarez". Journal of Latin American Studies. 2 (2). JSTOR 156583.
- Hardenburg, Walter (1912). The Putumayo, the Devil's Paradise; Travels in the Peruvian Amazon Region and an Account of the Atrocities Committed Upon the Indians Therein. London: Fischer Unwin. ISBN 1372293019.
- Eduardo, Fernández; Fobes Brown, Michael (1991). War of Shadows The Struggle for Utopia in the Peruvian Amazon. University of California Press. ISBN 978-0-520-07435-4.
