= Los Amigos River =

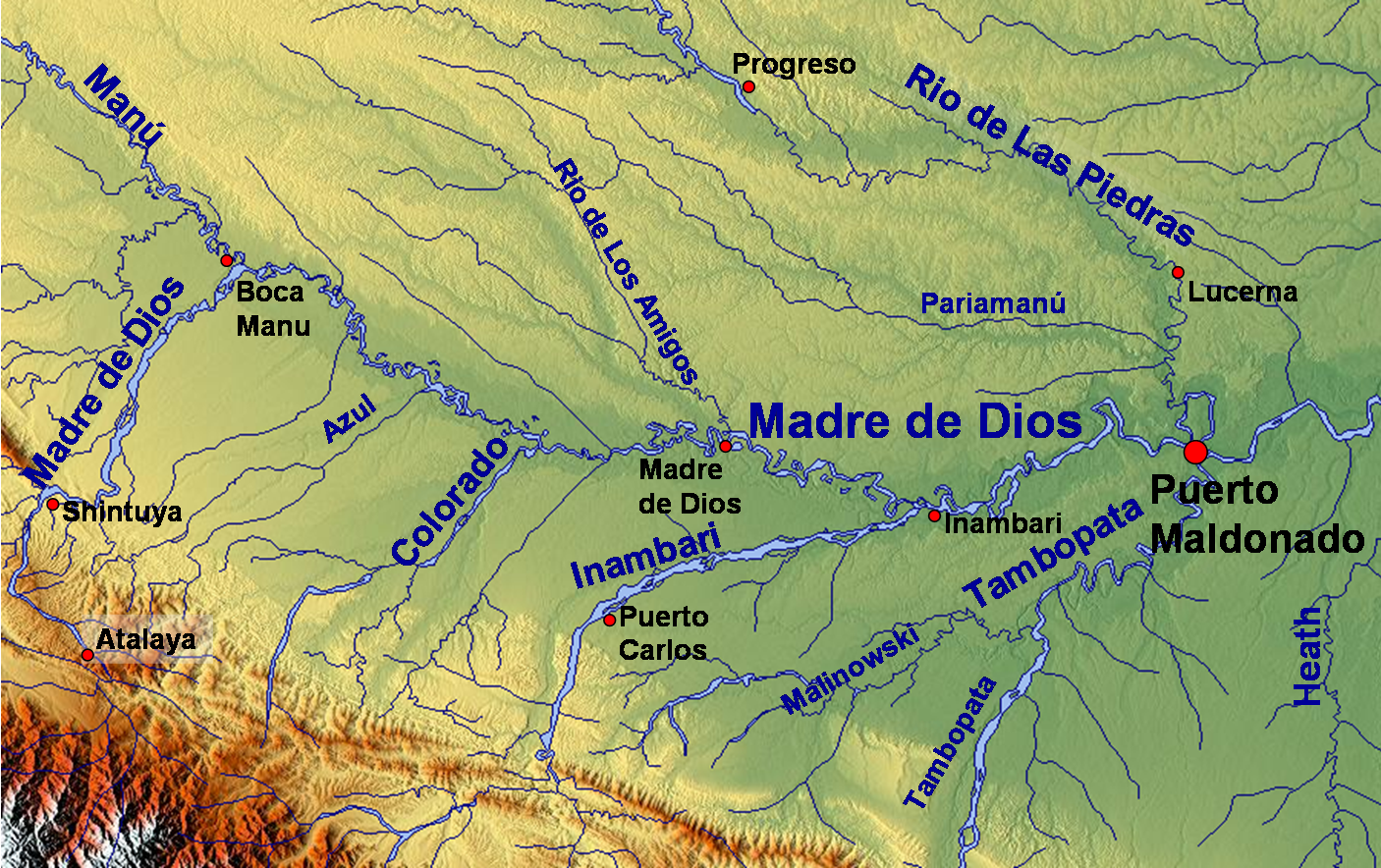
- The Madre de Dios watershed, including Los Amigos

Location
- Country: Peru

Physical characteristics
- Mouth
  - location: Madre de Dios River

The Los Amigos River ("Friends River", Spanish: Río los Amigos) is a river that flows through the Amazon rainforest in the Madre de Dios Region in southeastern Peru. It is a tributary of the 1,347 km long Madre de Dios River.

== Gallery ==
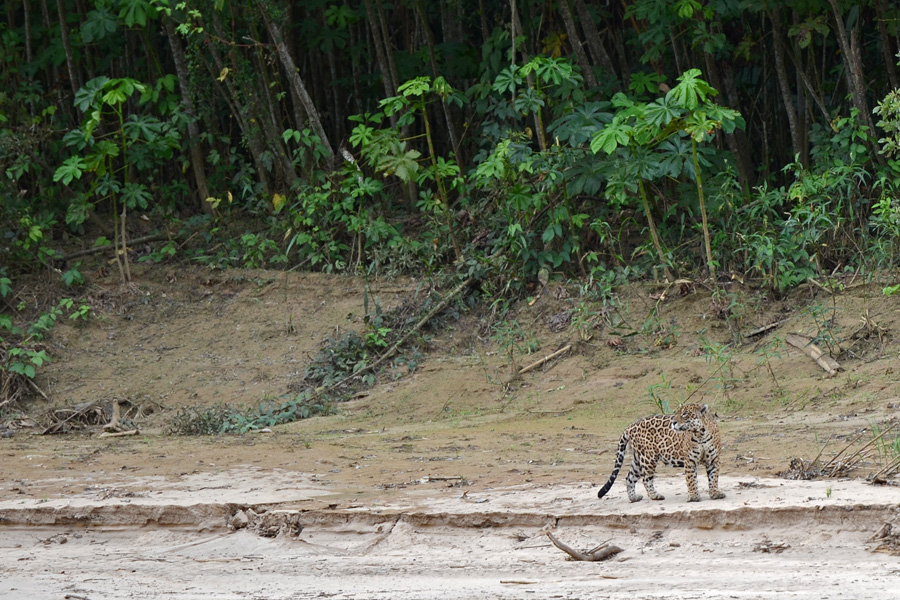
A Peruvian jaguar near the river. This population of the jaguar had been considered as a subspecies.

== See also ==
- Amazon basin
- Los Amigos Biological Station
