= Cissura bilineata =

Scientific classification
- Domain: Eukaryota
- Kingdom: Animalia
- Phylum: Arthropoda
- Class: Insecta
- Order: Lepidoptera
- Superfamily: Noctuoidea
- Family: Erebidae
- Subfamily: Arctiinae
- Genus: Cissura
- Species: C. bilineata

Binomial name
- Cissura bilineata Orfila, 1935

Species of moth

Cissura bilineata is a moth of the family Erebidae first described by Orfila in 1935. It is found in Paraguay.
