= Manu province =

Coordinates: 12°50′10″S 71°21′40″W

Manu
- Province
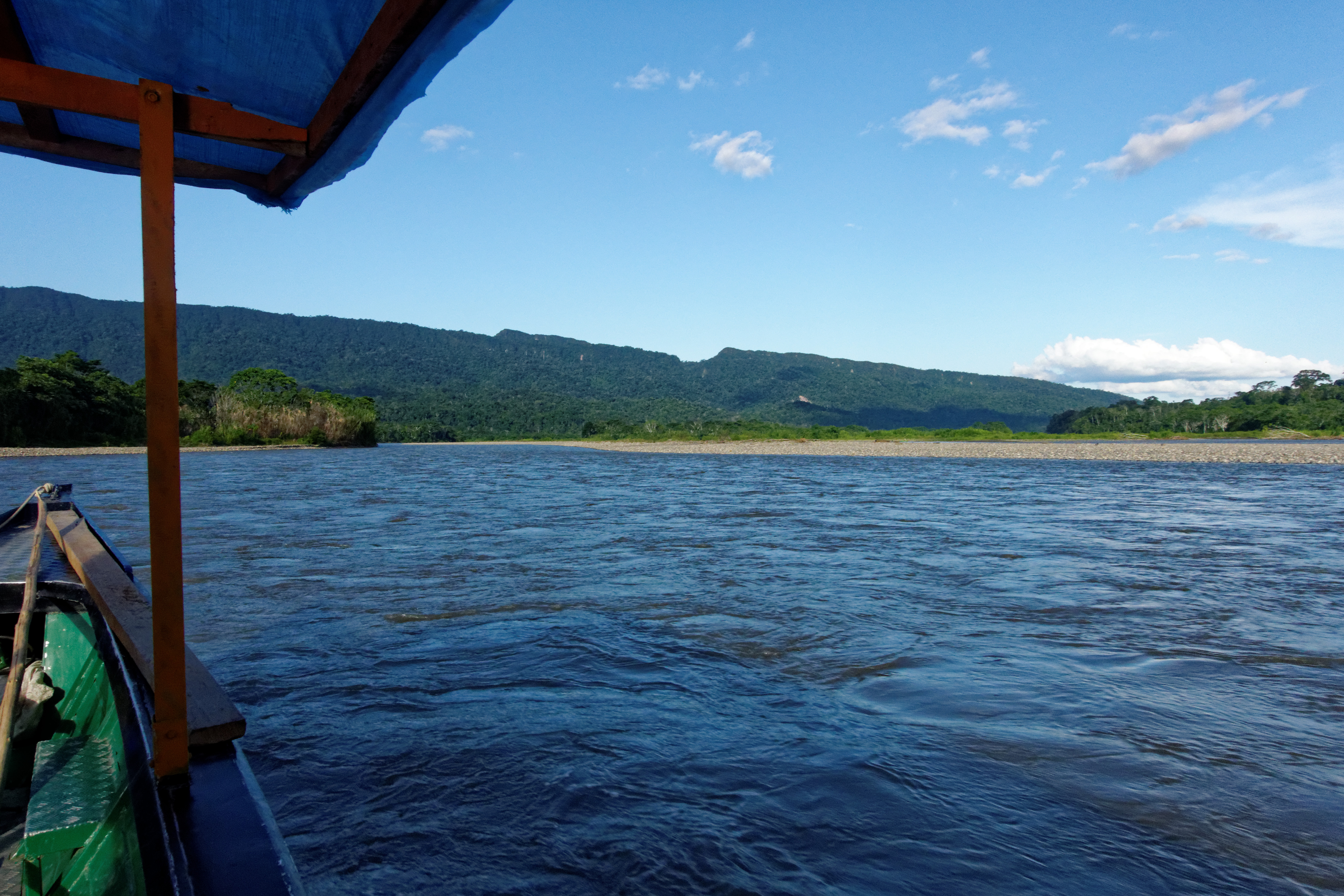

- Location of Manu in Madre de Dios Region
- Country: Peru
- Region: Madre de Dios
- Capital: Salvación

Government
  - Mayor: Flavio Americo Hurtado Leon (2007)

Area
  - Total: 27,835.17 km^{2} (10,747.22 sq mi)

Population (2005 census)
  - Total: 17,297
  - Density: 0.62141/km^{2} (1.6094/sq mi)
- UBIGEO: 1702
- Website: www.munimanu.gob.pe

Manu is one of three provinces in the Madre de Dios Region of Peru. The capital of the province is the city of Salvación.

== Political division ==
The province is divided into four districts (Spanish: distritos, singular: distrito), each of which is headed by a mayor (alcalde):

| District | Mayor | Capital | UBIGEO |
|---|---|---|---|
| Fitzcarrald | Walter Misael Mancilla Huamán | Boca Manu | 170202 |
| Huaypetue | Gelman Enrique Villegas Guillen | Huaypetue | 170204 |
| Madre de Dios | Lorenzo Castillo Espino | Boca Colorado | 170203 |
| Manu | Flavio Americo Hurtado León | Salvación | 170201 |

== See also ==
- Manu River
- Manu National Park
- Amarakaeri Communal Reserve
