= Miss Perú 1995 =

- Date: March 19, 1995
- Presenters: Antonio Vodanovic & Jessica Newton
- Venue: Óvalo de Miraflores, Miraflores, Lima
- Broadcaster: Andina de Televisión
- Entrants: 23
- Winner: Paola Dellepiane; Amazonas

The Miss Perú 1995 pageant was held on March 19, 1995. That year, 23 candidates were competing for the national crown. The chosen winner represented Peru at the Miss Universe 1995. The rest of the finalists would enter in different pageants.

== Placements ==
Final Results	Contestant
Miss Perú 1995	Amazonas - Paola Dellepiane
1st Runner-Up	Huancavelica - Pilar Abed
2nd Runner-Up	Arequipa - Fanny Rodríguez
3rd Runner-Up	Huánuco - Ljuvitza Vodanovic
4th Runner-Up	Junín - Maricielo Effio
Top 11^	Cajamarca - Úrsula Carranza; Puno - Milagros Cabanillas; San Martín - Gabriela Rivera; Apurímac - Fiorella Rodríguez; Callao- Patricia Gómez; Cuzco - Karin Mur

- The (^) means that there was supposed to be a Top 10. However, it was announced by the hosts at the live telecast during the Top 10 announcement that there was a tie for 10th place, thus making it a Top 11 at the end.

== Special awards ==
- Best Regional Costume - Puno - Milagros Cabanillas
- Miss Photogenic - Amazonas - Paola Dellepiane
- Miss Elegance - Puno - Milagros Cabanillas
- Miss Body - Huancavelica - Pilar Abed
- Best Hair - Pasco - Claudia Boero
- Miss Congeniality - Apurímac - Fiorella Rodriguez
- Most Beautiful Face - Amazonas - Paola Dellepiane

.

== Delegates ==
- Amazonas - Paola Dellepiane
- Áncash - Ana Sofía Orezolli
- Apurímac - Fiorella Rodríguez
- Arequipa - Fanny Rodríguez
- Ayacucho - Massiel Calvo
- Cajamarca - Ursula Carranza
- Callao - Patricia Gómez
- Cuzco - Karin Mur
- Huancavelica - Pilar Abed
- Huánuco - Ljuvitza Vodanovic
- Ica - Verónica Catter
- Junín - Maricielo Effio
- La Libertad - Catherine Tantaleán
- Lambayeque - Paola Boza
- Loreto - Mariana Puyo
- Madre de Dios - Romy Cubillas
- Moquegua - Bárbara Seminario
- Pasco - Claudia Boero
- Piura - Lorena Prado
- Puno - Milagros Cabanillas
- Region Lima - Michelle Clark
- San Martín - Gabriela Rivera
- Tumbes - Daysi Pasco

== Judges ==
- Fernando Andrade Carmona - Mayor of Miraflores District
- Rosalinda Serfaty - Soap Opera Actress
- Benjamin Kreimer - Former President of Miss Peru Org.
- Mariana Sovero McKay - Miss Peru 1989
- Teófilo Cubillas - Professional Peruvian Soccer player
- Javier Echevarría - Peruvian Actor
- Gina Scamarone - Public Relations Manager of TACA-Peru
- Javier Blanco - Regional Manager of San Antonio (Mineral water)
- Dr. Mario Drassinower - Plastic Surgeon
- Déborah de Souza - Miss Peru 1993

== Background Music ==
- Opening Show – Condor Pasa & Valicha (Instrumental)
- Swimsuit Competition – Candy Dulfer - Pick up the pieces
- Evening Gown Competition – Richard Clayderman - Piano Medley - (Just The Way You Are, Um dia de domingo, Heal The World & La Vie en Rose)

== Special Guests Singers ==
- Pedro Suárez-Vértiz - "No Pense que era Amor" & " Me Eleve"
