= Amarakaeri Communal Reserve =

Coordinates: 12°47′00″S 70°57′16″W

- Reserva Comunal Amarakaeri (Spanish)
- IUCN category VI (protected area with sustainable use of natural resources)
- Scarlet Macaw (Ara macao)
- Interactive map of Amarakaeri Communal Reserve
- Location: Peru; Madre de Dios Region; Manu Province
- Area: 4,023.36 km^{2} (1,553.43 sq mi)
- Established: 9 May 2002
- Website: https://www.facebook.com/todossomosamarakaeri

The Amarakaeri Communal Reserve (Spanish: Reserva Comunal Amarakaeri) is a protected area in Peru located in the Madre de Dios Region, Manú Province. It protects parts of the Southwest Amazon moist forests and Peruvian Yungas ecoregions.

Located in the reserve is the "Harakbut Face" that resembles a man's face. It is known by the native Harakbut tribesmen as the Rostro, which means face in their native language. The Harakbut people see the statue as a god. It was discovered in 2014. The native people did speak of it in oral history for generations, but had forgotten where it was located. Peru has declared it a Cultural Heritage of the Nation.

== See also ==
- Natural and Cultural Peruvian Heritage
- Uncontacted peoples
