= Maricris Rubio =

Peruvian model (born 1978)

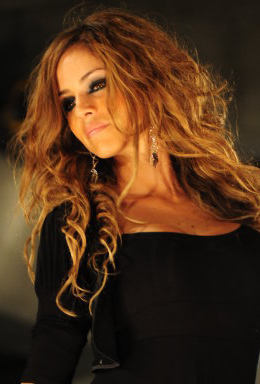
- Rubio in September 2010
- Born: María Cristina Rubio Ponce de León; 1978 (age 47–48); Trujillo, Peru
- Occupations: Model, actress
- Modeling information
- Height: 1.75 m (5 ft 9 in)

María Cristina Rubio Ponce de León (known as Maricris Rubio, born 1978) is a Peruvian model.

As a teenager, Rubio was "Queen of Spring" in Trujillo, and later on, Miss La Libertad and also Miss Hawaiian Tropic Peru. She has worked for modeling agencies in Mexico and the United States, where she has appeared as an extra in the video clip of Slash. After being on the models staff of the TV show Habacilar, she had her first appearance as an actress in the television series Al fondo hay sitio as Renata, during the third season.

== Filmography ==
- Habacilar (2010) as model
- Al fondo hay sitio (2011) as Renata Newman
