= Regional Government of Madre de Dios =

Regional government in Peru

- Gobierno Regional de Madre de Dios

Regional Government overview
- Formed: January 1, 2003; 22 years ago
- Jurisdiction: Department of Madre de Dios
- Website: Government site

The Regional Government of Madre de Dios (Spanish: Gobierno Regional de Madre de Dios; GORE Madre de Dios) is the regional government that represents the Department of Madre de Dios. It is the body with legal identity in public law and its own assets, which is in charge of the administration of provinces of the department in Peru. Its purpose is the social, cultural and economic development of its constituency. It is based in the city of Puerto Maldonado.

== List of representatives ==
Governor	Political party	Period
Rafael Ríos López	Movimiento Nueva Izquierda	January 1, 2003–September 9, 2005
José del Maestro Ríos	Movimiento Nueva Izquierda	September 9, 2005–December 31, 2006
Santos Kaway Komori	Movimiento Independiente Obras Siempre Obras	January 1, 2007–December 31, 2010
José Aguirre Pastor	Bloque Popular Madre de Dios	January 1, 2011–August 15, 2013
Jorge Aldazabal Soto	Bloque Popular Madre de Dios	August 15, 2013–December 31, 2014
Luis Otsuka Salazar	Democracia Directa	January 1, 2015–December 31, 2018
Luis Hidalgo Okimura	Alianza para el Progreso	January 1, 2019–December 31, 2022
Luis Otsuka Salazar	Avanza País	January 1, 2023–Incumbent

== See also ==
- Regional Governments of Peru
- Department of Madre de Dios
