= Miss Perú 1998 =

- Date: April 16, 1998
- Presenters: Coco Beleván & Sofía Franco
- Entertainment: La Toya Jackson
- Venue: María Angola Convention Center, Miraflores District, Lima
- Broadcaster: América Televisión
- Entrants: 20
- Winner: Karim Bernal; Huánuco

The Miss Perú 1998 pageant was held on April 16, 1998. That year, 20 candidates were competing for the national crown. The chosen winner represented Peru at the Miss Universe 1998. The rest of the finalists would enter in different pageants.

== Results ==
=== Placements ===
| Placement | Contestant |
|---|---|
| Miss Peru 1998 | Huánuco – Karim Bernal |
| 1st Runner-Up | Cuzco – Vanessa Rojas |
| 2nd Runner-Up | Lambayeque – Gabriela León |
| 3rd Runner-Up | Ucayali – Julissa Arana |
| 4th Runner-Up | Ica – Rosa Elvira Cartagena |
| Top 12 | Amazonas – Paola Valega; La Libertad – Tatiana Carbonel; Cajamarca – Marisol Fernández; Madre de Dios – Patricia Puch; Ancash – Mónica Herrera; Loreto – Úrsula Bravo; Ayacucho – Maritza Coello |

== Special awards ==
- Best Regional Costume - Huánuco - Karim Bernal
- Miss Photogenic - Amazonas - Paola Valega
- Miss Elegance - Huánuco - Karim Bernal
- Miss Body - Ica - Rosa Elvira Cartagena
- Best Hair - Arequipa - Diana Valderrama
- Miss Congeniality - Ucayali - Julissa Arana
- Most Beautiful Face - Madre de Dios - Patricia Puch

== Delegates ==
- Amazonas - Paola Valega
- Áncash - Mónica Herrera
- Arequipa - Diana Valderrama
- Ayacucho - Maritza Coello
- Cajamarca - Marisol Fernández
- Callao - Viviana Mendoza
- Cuzco - Vanessa Rojas
- Huánuco - Karim Bernal
- Ica - Rosa Elvira Cartagena
- Junín - Laurie Ann Meyer
- La Libertad - Tatiana Carbonel
- Lambayeque - Gabriela León
- Loreto - Úrsula Bravo
- Madre de Dios - Patricia Puch
- Piura - Pamela Ocampo
- Puno - Farah Gadea
- Region Lima - Fabiola Chino
- Tacna - Miryam del Pilar Aedo
- Tumbes - Claudia Neyra
- Ucayali - Julissa Arana

== Judges ==
- Luis Miguel Ciccia - Manager of Transportes CIVA
- Olga Zumarán - Miss Peru 1978
- Julie Freundt - Peruvian Singer
- Dr. Mario Drassinower - Plastic Surgeon
- Lalo Mercado - TV Presenter
- Natali Sacco - Miss Perú 1996
- Sol Carreño - News Anchorwoman & TV Journalist
- Norka Peralta del Águila - Peruvian Designer

== Background Music ==
- Opening Show – The Verve - "Bitter Sweet Symphony"
- Swimsuit Competition – James Brown - "I Feel Good"
- Evening Gown Competition – Enya - "Orinoco Flow"

== Special Guests Singers ==
- La Toya Jackson - "Stop in the Name of Love" & "Don't Break My Heart"

== Miss World Peru ==
The Miss World Peru 1998 pageant was held on June 7, 1998, That year, 24 candidates from the regions of Peru were competing for the national crown. The show host by Antonio Vodanovic and Jessica Newton were a live broadcast from Jockey Plaza Shopping Center by Panamericana Television. The chosen winner represented Peru at Miss World 1998. The rest of the finalists would enter in different pageants.

== Placements ==
| Final Results | Contestant |
|---|---|
| Miss World Peru 1998 | La Libertad - Mariana Larrabure |
| Miss International Peru 1998 | Tacna - Melissa Miranda Quiñones |
| Miss Peru Asia-Pacific 1998 | Lambayeque - Viviana Rivasplata |
| 1st Runner-Up | Junín - Grace Sanchez |
| 2nd Runner-Up | Madre de Dios - Brenda Robles Ganoza |
| 3rd Runner-Up | Amazonas - Ursula verastegui |
| Top 12 | Puno - Monica Cabanillas Gamarra; Ucayali - Marielena Leonardi; Region Lima - Katia Rosello; Cajamarca - Violeta vargas; San Martín - Zessy Coronado; Ica - Carmen Mora Marticorena |

== MWP Special Awards ==
- Miss Photogenic - Amazonas - Ursula verastegui
- Miss Elegance - Puno - Monica Cabanillas Gamarra
- Miss Body - Lambayeque - Viviana Rivasplata
- Best Hair - Ica - Carmen Mora
- Miss Congeniality - Junín - Grace Sanchez
- Most Beautiful Face - La Libertad - Mariana Larrabure

== Delegates ==
- Amazonas - Ursula verastegui
- Áncash - Carla Urrunaga
- Apurímac - Maria Pia Campodonico
- Arequipa - Georgia Queirolo
- Ayacucho - Maria del Pilar Cossio
- Cajamarca - Violeta vargas
- Callao - Karina Cervera Gallegos
- Cuzco - Maria del Pilar Leon
- Huánuco - Marigen Rojas
- Ica - Carmen Mora Marticorena
- Junín - Grace Sanchez
- La Libertad - Mariana Larrabure
- Lambayeque - Viviana Rivasplata
- Loreto - Karen Stendberg
- Madre de Dios - Brenda Robles Ganoza
- Moquegua - Elsa Guerra
- Pasco - Edith Ghia
- Piura - Milagros Pita
- Puno - Monica Cabanillas Gamarra
- Region Lima - Katia Rosello
- San Martín - Zessy Coronado
- Tacna - Melissa Miranda Quiñones
- Tumbes - Guiliana Vinazza
- Ucayali - Marielena Leonardi

== MWP Judges ==
- Carlos Morales - Public Relations Manager of Grupo D' elite
- Sasha Sökol - Mexican singer, composer & actress
- Sandro Finoglio - Mr. World 1998
- Eleazar Molina - Jewel Designer
- Moon Hym Kim - Daewoo Motors Rep. Director
- Rodrigo Wood - Coca-Cola's Regional Manager
- Gustavo Teixeira - Regional Manager of Philips Electronics corp.
- Alejandra Barbosa - Reina Intl. de las Playas, America & del caribe 1997
- Dr. Cesar Morillas - Plastic Surgeon
- Ricardo Davila - Fashion Designer
