= Miss Perú 1969 =

- Date: July 5, 1969
- Presenters: Pepe Ludmir
- Venue: Teatro Municipal (Lima)
- Broadcaster: Panamericana Televisión
- Entrants: 20
- Winner: María Julia Mantilla Mayer; La Libertad

The Miss Perú 1969 pageant was held on July 5, 1969. That year, 20 candidates were competing for the national crown. The chosen winner represented Peru at the Miss Universe 1969. The rest of the finalists would enter in different pageants.

== Placements ==
Final Results	Contestant
Miss Peru Universe 1969	La Libertad - María Julia Mantilla Mayer
1st Runner-Up	Puno - Sandra Manrique
2nd Runner-Up	Junín - Maricarmen Souza
Top 6	USA Perú - Ana Claire Temple; Amazonas - Isabel Montenegro; Pasco - Laura D'Brot

== Special awards ==
- Best Regional Costume - Moquegua - Vilma Villafuerte
- Miss Photogenic - Puno - Sandra Manrique
- Best Hair - USA Perú - Ana Claire Temple
- Miss Congeniality - Ayacucho - Lucía Galarza
- Miss Elegance - La Libertad - María Julia Mantilla Mayer

== Delegates ==
- Amazonas - Isabel Montenegro
- Áncash - Fabiola Olaya
- Apurímac - Gloria Camila Solorzano
- Ayacucho - Lucia del Pilar Galarza
- Cuzco - Ellie Carrasco
- Distrito Capital - Catalina Rizzo
- Europe Perú - Tamara Rosenshein
- Huancavelica - Leonora Carmona
- Huánuco - Raquel Bendezú
- Ica - Rosalia Buendia
- Junín - Maria del Carmen Souza
- La Libertad - María Julia Mantilla Mayer
- Moquegua - Vilma Villafuerte
- Pasco - Laura D'Brot
- Puno - Sandra Manrique
- Region Lima - Araceli Ledesma
- San Martín - Betina Olortegui
- Tacna - Rossana Oviedo
- Tumbes - Maria Luisa Zorrilla
- USA Perú - Ana Claire Temple
