= Salvación =

Coordinates: 12°50′10″S 71°21′40″W

- Village
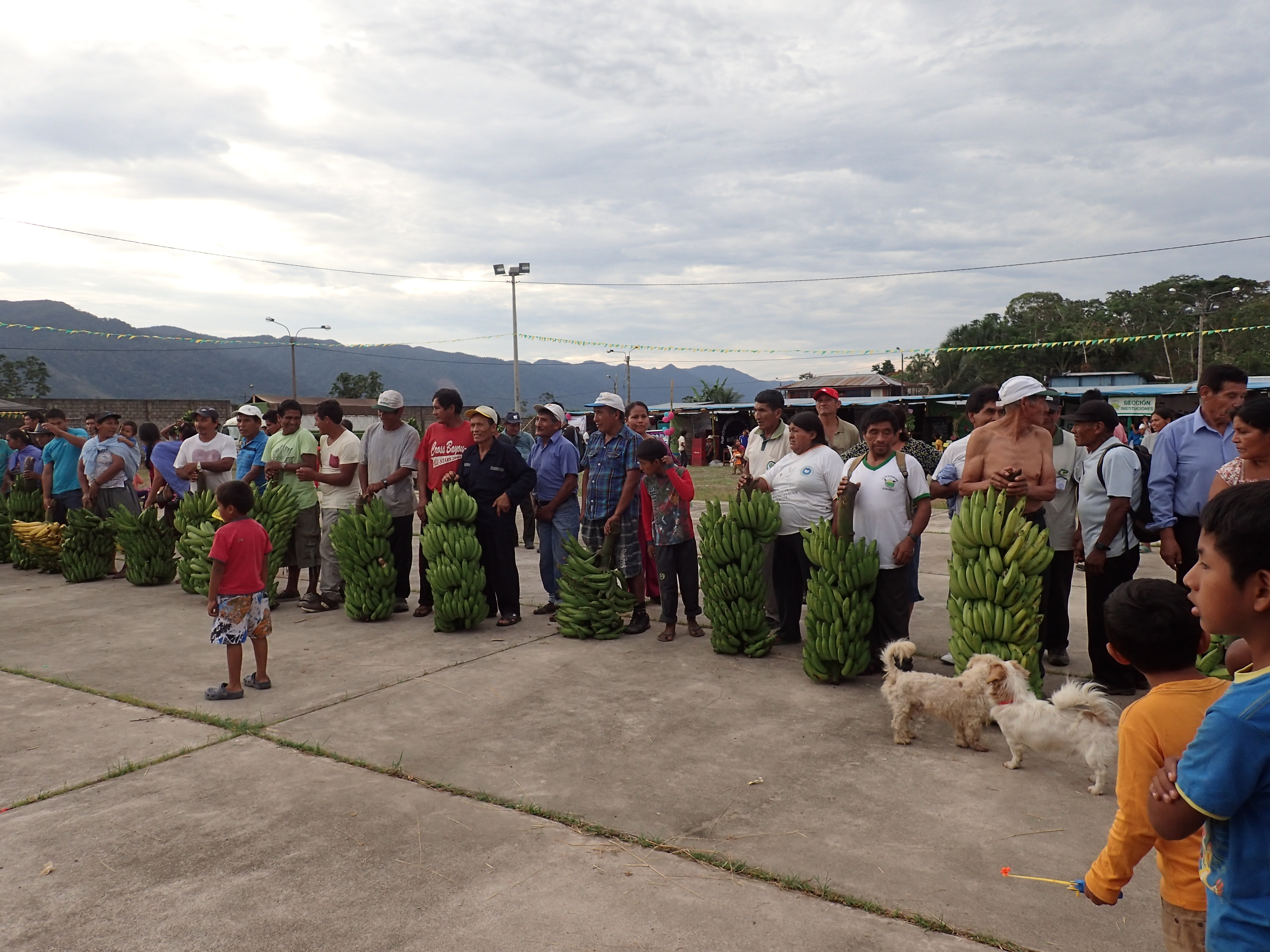
- Interactive map of Salvación
- Country: Peru
- Region: Madre de Dios
- Province: Manú
- District: Manú

Government
  - Mayor: Flavio Americo Hurtado Leon
- Elevation: 550 m (1,800 ft)
- Time zone: UTC-5 (PET)

Salvación is a town in Southern Peru, capital of the province Manú in the region Madre de Dios.
