= Department of Madre de Dios =

Department of Peru

Madre de Dios Amaru (Quechua)
- Department
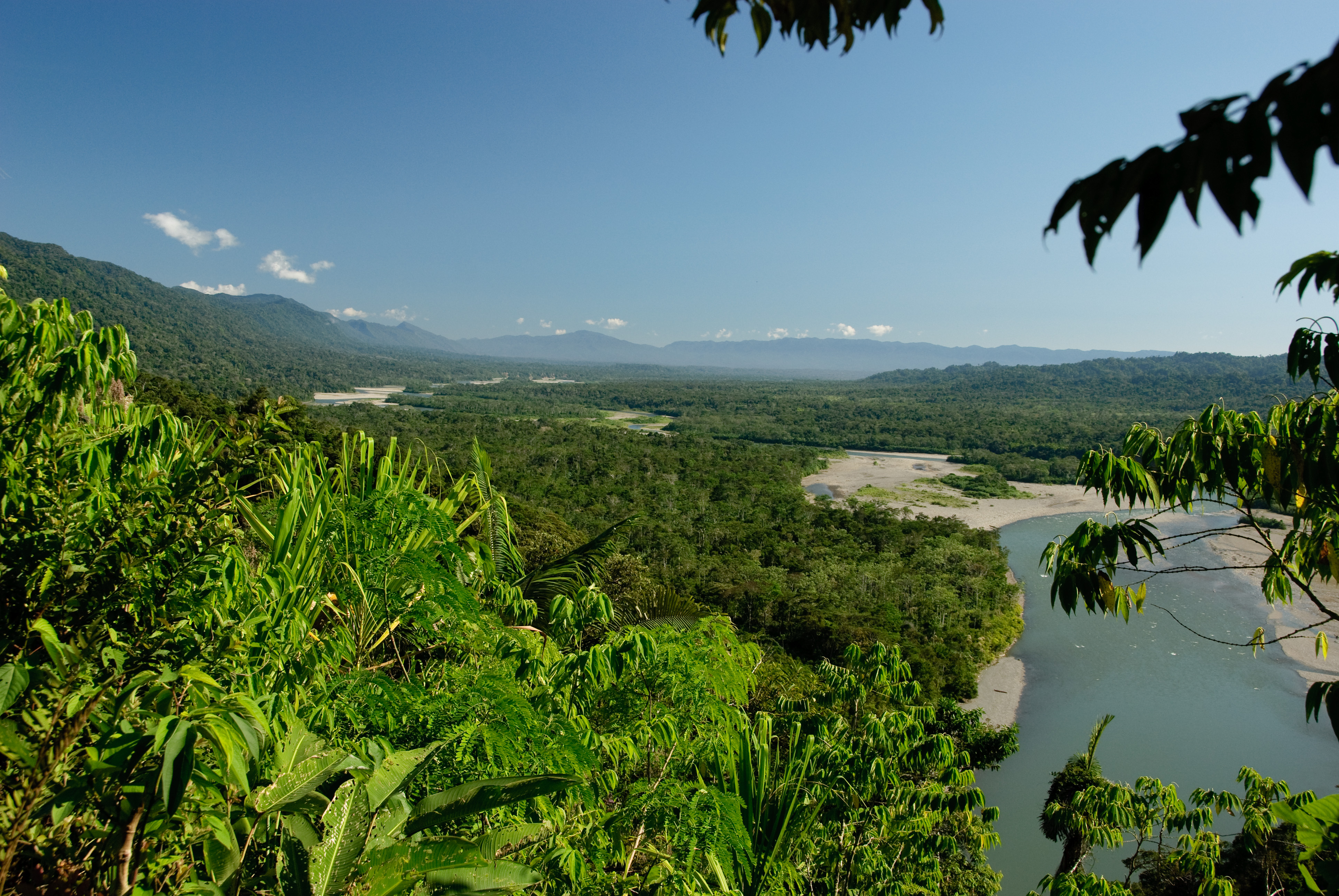
- Manu National Park

- Flag Coat of arms

- Location of Madre de Dios within Peru
- Interactive map of Madre de Dios
- Coordinates: 11.99°S 70.59°W
- Country: Peru
- Capital: Puerto Maldonado
- Provinces: List: Manu; Tahuamanu; Tambopata

Government
  - Type: Regional Government
  - Governor: Lisett Sharon Revollar Cáceres

Area
  - Total: 85,300.54 km^{2} (32,934.72 sq mi)
- Highest elevation: 3,932 m (12,900 ft)
- Lowest elevation: 183 m (600 ft)

Population (2025 census)
  - Total: 208,682
  - Density: 2.44643/km^{2} (6.33623/sq mi)
- Demonym: madrediosino
- UBIGEO: 17
- Dialing code: 082
- ISO 3166 code: PE-MDD
- Principal resources: Cotton, coffee, sugar cane, cacao beans, Brazil nuts, palm oil, gold, rice, coconut, wood.
- Poverty rate: 36.7%
- Percentage of Peru's GDP: 0.37%
- Website: www.regionmadrededios.gob.pe

Madre de Dios (Spanish pronunciation: [ˈmaðɾe ðe ˈðjos], English: Mother of God) is a department of Peru. Located in the country's southeast, it borders Brazil, Bolivia, and the Peruvian departments of Puno, Cusco, and Ucayali, in the Amazon Basin. It is also the third largest department in Peru, after Ucayali and Loreto. However, it is also the least densely populated department in Peru, as well as its least populous department. It has one of the lowest poverty rates in Peru. It is administered by a regional government. Its capital is the city of Puerto Maldonado.

According to the adjusted 2025 census results, around 209,000 people lived in Madre de Dios.

== Etymology ==
The name of the department is derived from the Madre de Dios River, ultimately a tributary of the Amazon, and named by ethnic Spanish colonists. It is a very common Spanish language designation for the Virgin Mary, literally meaning Mother of God.

== Geography ==
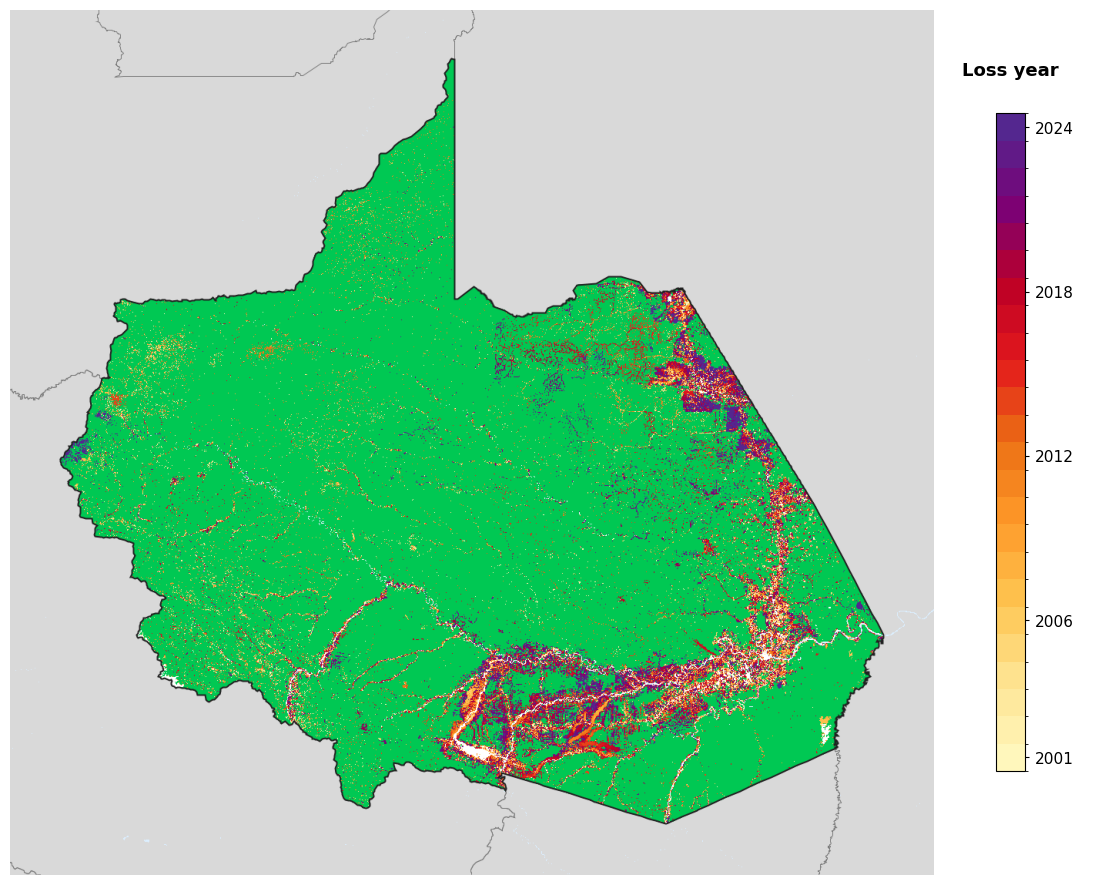
Tree-cover loss year in Madre de Dios, 2001-2024, from the Global Forest Change dataset.

The department is almost entirely low-lying Amazon rainforest. The climate is warm and damp, with average temperatures around 26 °C (79 °F) [max.: 34 °C (93 °F), min.: 21 °C (70 °F)]. The rainy season is from December to March, when torrential rainfall causes rivers to swell and often overflow their banks. Annual precipitation can be as much as 3 metres (9.8 ft).

The north-western boundary with the Cusco Region is known as the Isthmus of Fitzcarrald, a series of small and low mountains that separate the Madre de Dios River and the Urubamba/Ucayali River basins.

Notable rivers in the Madre de Dios River watershed are the Inambari, Tambopata, Manu, Tahuamanu, Las Piedras (also known as Tacuatimanu River), Heath, Acre, and Los Amigos.

Due to the vast size of the area and its low population density, rivers provide the best way of getting from one town to another. Human activity is invariably confined to riverbanks. A number of explorers have searched for the lost city of Paititi in the jungle within the region. A new road that opened in early 2011 through the area will connect Brazil and Peru for trade, and change the isolation of this area.

The only important highway is between the Peruvian cities of Puerto Maldonado and Cusco, 510 kilometres (320 mi) away in the Cuzco Department. It is part of the newly built Interoceanic Road between the Pacific and Atlantic Oceans, passing by the border town Iñapari on the Acre river. Flights between Cusco and Puerto Maldonado remain the most common and quicker method of transport between the two.

From Puerto Maldonado a road about 55 kilometres (34 mi) long leads to the mining town Laberinto ("Labyrinth"). A second road is between the village of Pillcopata and Itahuania (into the Manú National Park). It is a roughly 350 kilometres (220 mi)-long single-track road that is hard to travel in the rainy season. It also has a dirt road to the native community of Infierno ("Hell"), where the Ese'ejas (or Guarayos) live. Their chief is Agustín Shapaja, who led the famous expedition (made into a TV special) to the Candamo. He was featured in the TV documentary El Candamo, la Ultima Tierra sin Hombres (The Candamo, The Last Land without Men).

== Economy ==
Madre de Dios depends heavily on natural products and raw materials for its economy. There is virtually no manufacturing industry. The main agricultural products are:

1. Cotton
2. Coffee
3. Sugarcane
4. Cacao beans
5. Brazil nuts
6. Palm oil

Illegal gold mining is the only other large industry of the region, confined mainly to alluvium adjacent to the Inambari and Madre de Dios rivers. Significant deforestation has resulted due to this activity. In addition, techniques for gold mining have been described as resulting in both a major environmental and public health problem. Most gold miners use liquid mercury to extract gold particles from the alluvium. They often handle the toxic liquid mercury with their bare hands. To purify the gold particles, the mercury is burned off. After being vaporized, mercury particles contaminate the surrounding ecosystems. Mercury bioaccumulates throughout the food chain to become concentrated in top predators, such as large river fish and carnivorous birds. The local people may be harmed by direct contact with the element, as well as by ingesting dangerous levels of mercury when they eat the fish. Mercury results in a variety of neurological and congenital health problems.

Ecotourism is a major emerging industry in Madre de Dios. A number of lodges in Manu and Tambopata are becoming part of what is described as the Vilcabamba-Amboró Corridor. Some of these EcoLodges offer adventure activities as well. New legislation encourages private investors to create concessions for conservation or ecotourism. This is to extend the reaches of the public protected areas. This integration includes native communities, which are increasingly involved in ecotourism. The importance of including the local population relies on the long-term incentives for leaving standing forest. The local population is integrated into conservation initiatives as well as economic cycles.

== Political divisions ==
Map of provinces

The region is divided into three provinces (provincias, singular: provincia), which are composed of 11 districts (distritos, singular: distrito). The provinces, with their capitals in parentheses, are:

- Manu (Salvación)
- Tahuamanu (Iñapari)
- Tambopata (Puerto Maldonado)

== Demographics ==
=== Languages ===
According to the national 2007 Peru Census, the language learnt first by most of the residents of the region was Spanish (80.00%), followed by Quechua (16.53%). The Quechua varieties spoken in Madre de Dios are Cusco–Collao Quechua and Santarrosino Kichwa. The following table shows the breakdown by province of first languages:

Province	Quechua	Aymara	Asháninka	Another native language	Spanish	Foreign language	Deaf or mute	Total
Manu	5,731	239	9	1,540	11,170	18	16	18,723
Tahuamanu	897	166	7	74	8,870	94	15	10,123
Tambopata	10,202	586	14	481	61,387	197	75	72,942
Total	16,830	991	30	2,095	81,427	309	106	101,788
%	16.53	0.97	0.03	2.06	80.00	0.30	0.10	100.00

== Culture ==
The region is the location of many ancient Inca ruins. Several indigenous tribes survive in the jungle of the Amazon Basin.

== Places of interest ==
- Amarakaeri Communal Reserve
- Purús Communal Reserve
- Tambopata National Reserve

== Representation in other media ==
- This area was the setting of Werner Herzog's Fitzcarraldo (1982), based on the exploits of Carlos Fermín Fitzcarrald (1862–1897), a rubber baron from Iquitos.
- In the science fiction novel Primeval: Shadow of the Jaguar (2008), most of the story takes place in Madre de Dios. A time anomaly has opened and let a pack of prehistoric Thylacosmilus into the modern world.
- The region is the subject of a memoir by conservationist and explorer Paul Rosolie, Mother of God: An Extraordinary Journey into the Uncharted Tributaries of the Western Amazon (2014)
- The region is the primary setting for the memoir Ruthless River: Love and Survival by Raft on the Amazon's Relentless Madre de Dios (2017) by Holly Fitzgerald about an ill-fated rafting journey in 1973.

== See also ==
- Julio Cusurichi Palacios, environmentalist
