= Peruvian Americans =

Americans of Peruvian birth or descent

Peruvian Americans Peruanoestadounidenses
- Peruvian Ancestry by state

Total population
- 807,601 (2023); 0.24% of the U.S. population (2023)

Regions with significant populations
- New York metropolitan area; Greater Boston; Philadelphia metropolitan area; Greater Cleveland; Metro Detroit; Chicago metropolitan area; Milwaukee metropolitan area; Washington metropolitan area; Research Triangle; Metro Atlanta; Miami metropolitan area; Minneapolis–Saint Paul; Greater Houston; Dallas–Fort Worth metroplex; Seattle metropolitan area; Denver metropolitan area; San Francisco Bay Area; Greater Los Angeles

Languages
- American English; Peruvian Spanish; Quechua; Spanglish

Religion
- Predominantly Roman Catholicism

Related ethnic groups
- Peruvians, Black Peruvians, White Peruvians, Native Peruvians, Ecuadorian Americans, Colombian Americans, Bolivian Americans, other Hispanic Americans, Arab Americans, Indian Americans, Chinese Americans, Japanese Americans, Korean Americans, Native Americans

Peruvian Americans are Americans of Peruvian descent.

According to the U.S. Census Bureau 2021 American Community Survey 1-Year Estimates, as of 2021, 720,626 U.S. residents identify themselves as being of Peruvian origin. Peruvian Americans are one of the smaller yet culturally unique subgroups of Hispanics, making up about 1.1% of the entire Hispanic population in the United States, according to current studies. Approximately 62% of Peruvian Americans were born in Peru, with a growing population of Peruvian Americans being born in the United States.

Peruvian Americans immigrated to the United States in four major waves. Small but significant waves of immigration occurred in San Francisco during the gold rush (along with Chilean miners beginning in 1848) and the Metro Detroit area in the 1950s. According to historical reports, several Peruvian immigrants in California during the Gold Rush become active in local groups, helping to establish the first Latin American cultural preservation initiatives in the United States. Another wave of immigration occurred again early in the twentieth century, due largely to the burgeoning textile industry in New York and New Jersey. In the 1950s, there were a reported approximate 100 Peruvian families that resided in Paterson, New Jersey.

Factors that influenced Peruvian emigration was the decrease in employment, political persecution, public insecurity and violence, economic uncertainty, theft, and impunity. Beginning in the 1970s another wave of Peruvians arrived in the United States, most of whom were fleeing Peru's militaristic government under the dictatorships of Juan Velasco Alvarado and Francisco Morales Bermúdez, both of which were marked by coups and socio-economic instability. The 1980s and 1990s saw the most significant influx of Peruvians to U.S. shores, this time in response to the hyperinflation crisis that plagued the Peruvian economy, internal unrest in Peru by terrorist groups, and an authoritarian government headed by Peruvian President Alberto Fujimori.

Immigrants often come from urban areas of Peru, especially Lima, and the majority settle in the New York City metropolitan area—particularly in Paterson and Passaic in New Jersey and the New York City borough of Queens. The various settlement patterns have resulted in the formation of regional networks and community groups throughout these urban centers, all of which support the preservation of Peruvian culture. Peruvian Americans are also clustered in the metropolitan areas of Miami; Los Angeles; Houston, Texas; Washington, D.C.; and Virginia.

Recently, Peru has enjoyed economic growth and political stability since the start of the millennia. As a result, there has been a decline in the amount of Peruvian immigration to the United States unto 2019 under economic pretenses and instead for education. By 2021, more Peruvian students were attending American colleges, especially those pursuing business and engineering degrees.

== Settlement in the United States ==
The states with the largest number of Peruvian Americans are Florida, California, New Jersey, and New York. Texas and Virginia are also home to significant communities of people of Peruvian descent.

Little is known about the earliest Peruvian immigrants who came to the United States during the California gold rush. Later Peruvian immigrants began arriving in the early twentieth century to work in textile mills in Paterson, New Jersey, which is now home to one of the largest Peruvian communities in the United States. Paterson has a significant number of businesses run by Peruvian Americans, as well as social and political organizations, and remains a destination for Peruvian immigrants of all social classes.

=== Immigration ===
Undocumented Peruvian Americans make up less than 1% of the total undocumented immigrant population in the United States according to a 2015 report by the United States Department of Homeland Security. In Fiscal Year 2019, 10,049 Peruvians immigrated to the United States.

== Lifestyle and culture ==
The most famous and first aspect of Peruvian culture that deals with the United States is the book, "The Incas's Florida" La Florida del Inca written at the end of sixteenth century by the Inca Garcilaso de la Vega. Garcilaso's book details the travels of the explorer Hernando de Soto who had participated in the Forty-Years War between the Incas and the Spanish (1531–1571) and who later came to the lands that would become part of the United States and that the Spanish called "Florida."

The most popular dishes of Peruvian food in the U.S. include ceviche (raw fish "cooked" in lime juice), papa a la huancaína, lomo saltado, and anticuchos. Peruvian cuisine is often recognized for being one of the most diverse and appreciated of the world's cuisines, with influences including Native American, European, and African. Since there is a sizable Chinese and Japanese minority in Peru, an Asian influence has also been deeply incorporated in Peruvian cuisine. There are Chifas, or Asian-style Peruvian restaurants that serve typical Chinese or Japanese food with a Peruvian culinary influence. Inca Kola, a soda that originated in Peru, is sold in many heavily concentrated Latin American areas.

The extended family commonly serves an economic function, too, with some new immigrants temporarily living with extended family already established in the United States, and in expensive urban centers, such arrangements sometimes are permanent.

== Socioeconomic status ==
Nearly half of Peruvians have resided in the United States for over 20 years, with 46% of foreign-born Peruvians reported to have lived in the United States for 20 years or more.

Despite being a relatively recent ethnic group, the median household income for Peruvians meets the average American household income and 44% of Peruvians born in the United States over the age of 25 have college degrees, exceeding the U.S. national average of 24%.

Around 90% of Peruvians lived above the poverty rate in 2017, with a poverty rate of 10% compared to the United States national average of 12.3% that same year.

== Activism ==
The Peruvian American Coalition in Passaic, New Jersey functions as an activist organization on behalf of the overall welfare of Peruvian Americans.

== Demographics ==
Peruvians have settled throughout the United States, migrating particularly to Northern New Jersey and the New York City Metropolitan Area, the Miami metropolitan area, the Washington metropolitan area, and the Los Angeles metropolitan area.

Notably, a rapidly growing number of Peruvian Americans, about 10,000 in 2018, have established an increasingly prominent community in Paterson, New Jersey, which is considered by many to be the capital of the Peruvian Diaspora in the United States, partially owing to the presence of the Peruvian Consulate. Market Street, the Little Lima in downtown Paterson, is the largest Peruvian American enclave and is lined with Peruvian-owned restaurants, bakeries, delicatessens, bodegas, travel agencies, and other businesses. The Peruvian American community has expanded into Paterson's neighboring areas of Fair Lawn, Elmwood Park, Clifton, and Passaic in Northern New Jersey as well, all within the New York City Metropolitan Area. The annual Peruvian Independence Day Parade is held in Paterson.

=== States with highest Peruvian population ===
The 10 states with the largest Peruvian population were (Source: Census 2017):

1. Florida – 100,965 (0.5% of state population)
2. California – 91,511 (0.2% of state population)
3. New Jersey – 75,869 (0.9% of state population)
4. New York – 66,318 (0.3% of state population)
5. Virginia – 29,096 (0.4% of state population)
6. Texas – 22,605 (0.1% of state population)
7. Maryland – 18,229 (0.3% of state population)
8. Connecticut – 16,424 (0.5% of state population)
9. Georgia – 10,570 (0.1% of state population)
10. Illinois – 10,213 (0.2% of state population)

The U.S. state with the smallest Peruvian population (as of 2010) was North Dakota with 78 Peruvians (less than 0.1% of state population).

=== Metro Areas ===
The top 5 U.S. metropolitan areas with the largest Peruvian population were:

1. New Jersey-New York Greater Area – 182,672
2. Miami metropolitan area – 81,729
3. Washington, D.C. – 53,961
4. Los Angeles metropolitan area – 48,380
5. San Francisco Bay Area – 26,969

== Notable people ==
=== Artists ===
- Alex Acuña – drummer and percussionist
- Miguel Harth-Bedoya – conductor
- Roberto Eyzaguirre – classical pianist and famed piano pedagogue
- Gabriela Lena Frank – American pianist and composer of contemporary classical music
- Josh Keaton – actor, singer and musical producer
- Adele Morales – American painter and memoirist; of Spanish and Peruvian descent
- Plavka – American singer of Croatian and Peruvian origin
- Susana Raab – Award-winning fine arts photographer based in Washington, D.C.
- Kat Reeder – artist, illustrator and graphic designer
- Ginger Reyes – rock musician
- Alex Rivera – U.S. filmmaker specialising in films about labor, immigration, and politics
- Carmen Giménez Smith – American poet, writer, and editor
- Tony Succar – Peruvian born American musician, composer, arranger and producer
- Yma Sumac – indigenous soprano
- Mario Testino – photographer
- Boris Vallejo – Peruvian-born American painter
- Alberto Vargas – painter

=== Entertainment ===
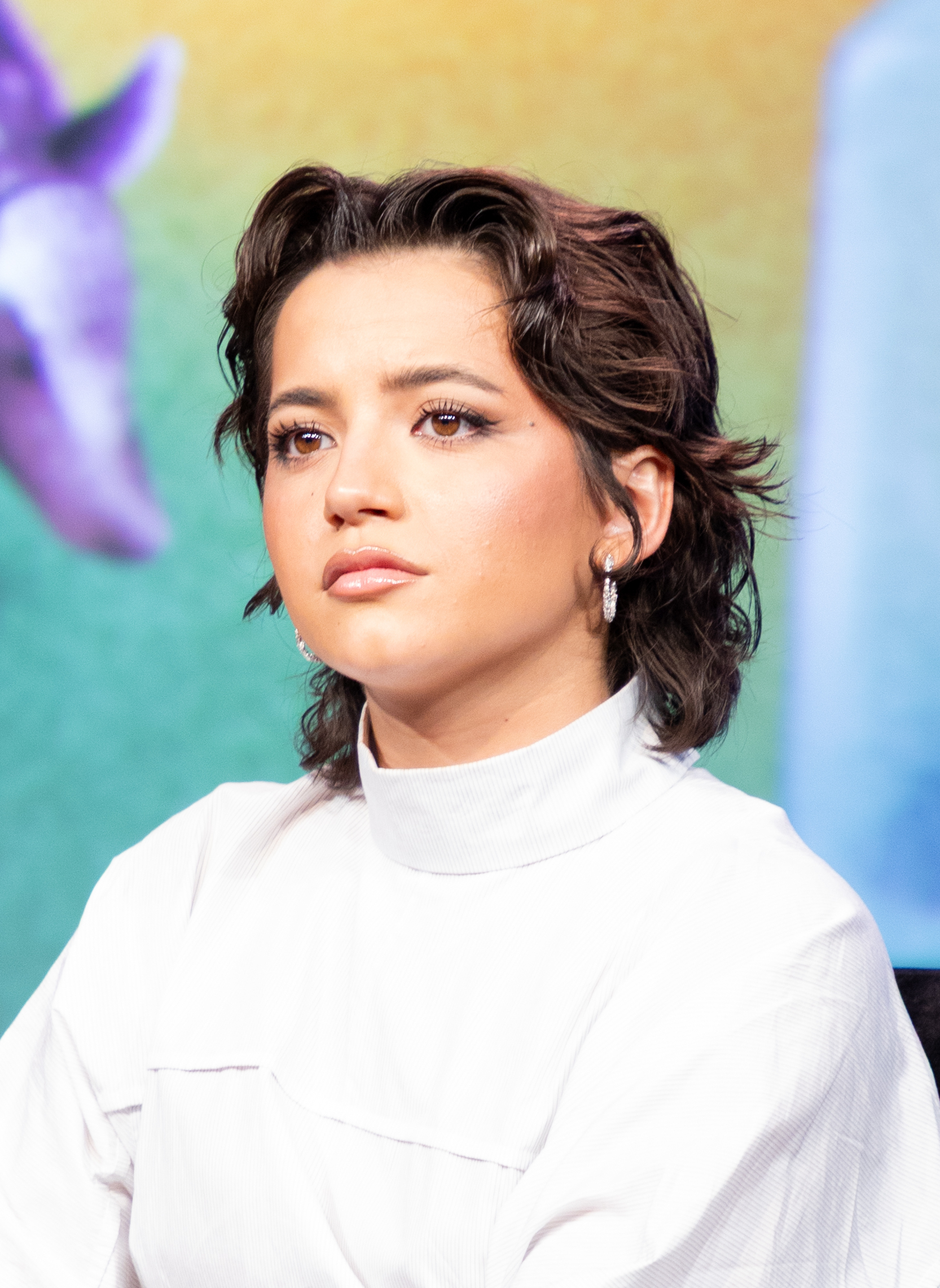
Isabela Merced

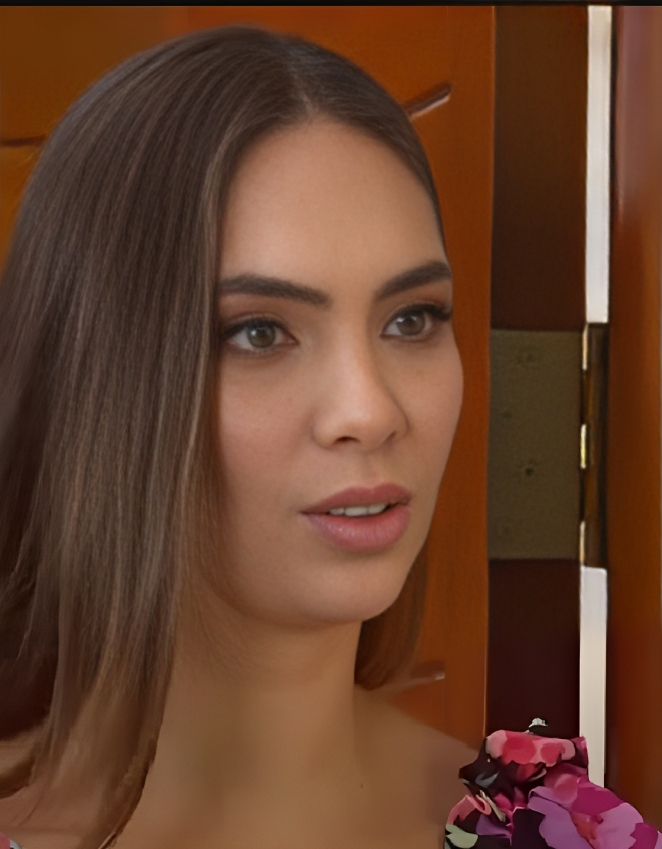
Natalie Vértiz

- Jorge Andres – award winning national sportscaster and former ESPN Sportscenter anchor
- Alexis Amore – pornographic actress
- Daniella Alonso – American actress. Her father is from Peru, of Japanese origins.
- Miguel Arteta – son of a Peruvian, director of film and television, known for his independent film Chuck & Buck (2000), for which he received the Independent Spirit John Cassavetes Award, and Cedar Rapids.
- Amber Barretto – American actress
- David Bernal – illusionary dancer
- Benjamin Bratt – actor, Peruvian on his mother's side
- Pepe Barreto – community and entertainment reporter for KMEX-TV, Channel 34
- Jorge Benítez – (also known as George Benitez) former U.S. soccer forward
- Julio C. Canani – Peruvian trainer in American Thoroughbred horse racing who has won three Breeders' Cup races.
- David Torrence – athlete, he had a U.S. record of 1,000 meters; and he also represented Peru at the 2016 Rio de Janeiro Olympic Games. He was born in Japan and had Peruvian ancestry per his mother; his father is American.
- Roberto Carcelen – Peruvian-American cross-country skier
- Carmen Carrera – American model of Peruvian and Puerto Rican descent
- Diego Chávarri – soccer player
- Jorge Masvidal – mixed martial artist of Peruvian-Cuban descent
- Isabela Merced – American actress to a Peruvian mother.
- Cesar Conde – Chairman of NBC Universal International Group & Telemundo Enterprises
- Kenny Florian – mixed martial artist
- Richard Green – soccer defender
- Kathleen Herles – Peruvian American voice actress
- Q'orianka Kilcher – actress
- Pedro Pablo León – soccer forward
- Carlos Navarro – American actor and radio personality
- Alex Olmedo – former tennis player from Peru with American citizenship
- Luis Palomino – Peruvian-American mixed martial artist who competes in the lightweight division
- Edgar Prado – jockey
- Rosa Salazar – American actress of Peruvian descent
- Tom Segura – Peruvian-American stand-up comedian
- Daniel Tuccio – Peruvian-American television reporter/news anchor
- Jose Valdivia, Jr. – jockey in American thoroughbred horse racing
- Carlos De Valdez (1894–1939) – Peruvian film actor who appeared in around forty American films. He spend the last years of his life in United States (where he died).
- Natalie Vértiz – beauty pageant titleholder and won Miss Perú 2011.

=== Politics ===
- Juan Bandini – (1800–1859) early settler of what would become San Diego, California
- Alvaro Bedoya, former government official serving on the Federal Trade Commission (FTC)
- Fernando Belaúnde Terry – American educator, former President of Peru (1963–1968; 1980–1985)
- Elizabeth Guzmán – former member of the Virginia House of Delegates
- Jim Himes – American businessman and politician, also Ranking member of the House Intelligence Committee (HPSCI) from Connecticut
- Robert Garcia – former Mayor of Long Beach, California, Member of the U.S. House of Representatives from California's 42nd district (first Peruvian-American elected to Congress)
- Pedro Pablo Kuczynski – former President of Peru (2016–2018)
- Augusto B. Leguía – businessman, former Prime Minister of Peru, former President of Peru (1908–1912; 1919–1930)
- Felipe Reinoso – former member of the Connecticut House of Representatives
- Alejandro Toledo – former President of Peru (2001–2006)
- Jackie Toledo – former member of the Florida House of Representatives

As of 2020, four Presidents of Peru are or were Peruvian-Americans.

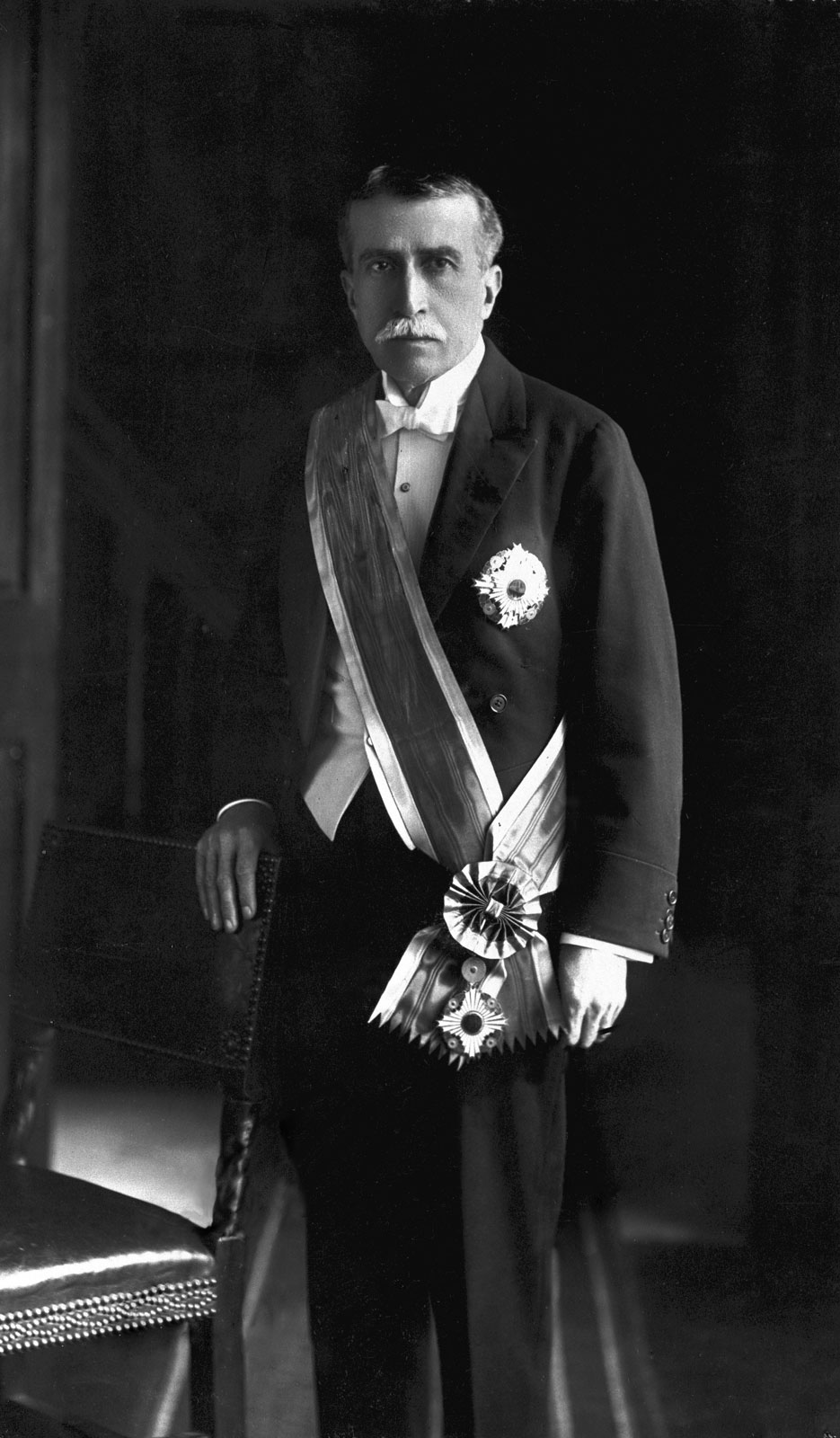
Augusto Leguía (1908–1912; 1919–1930)

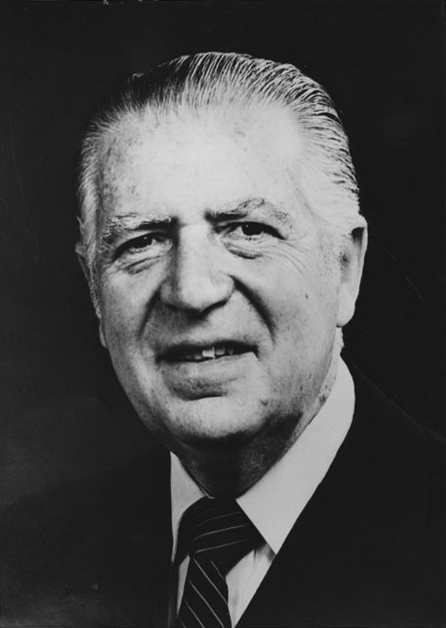
Fernando Belaúnde Terry, 80th President of Peru (1963–1968; 1980–1985)

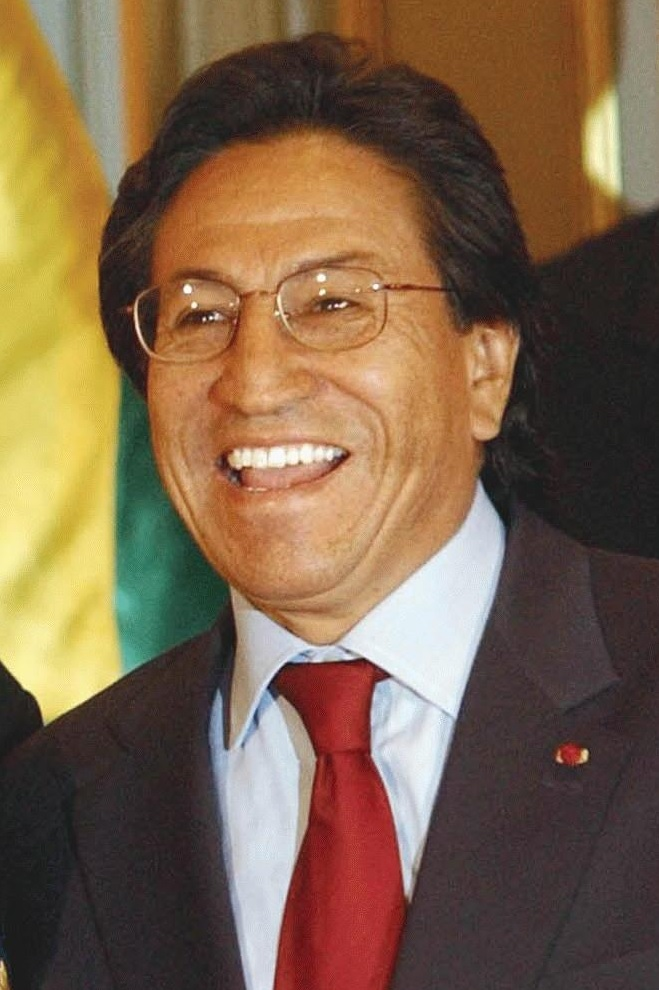
Alejandro Toledo, 84th President of Peru (2001–2006)

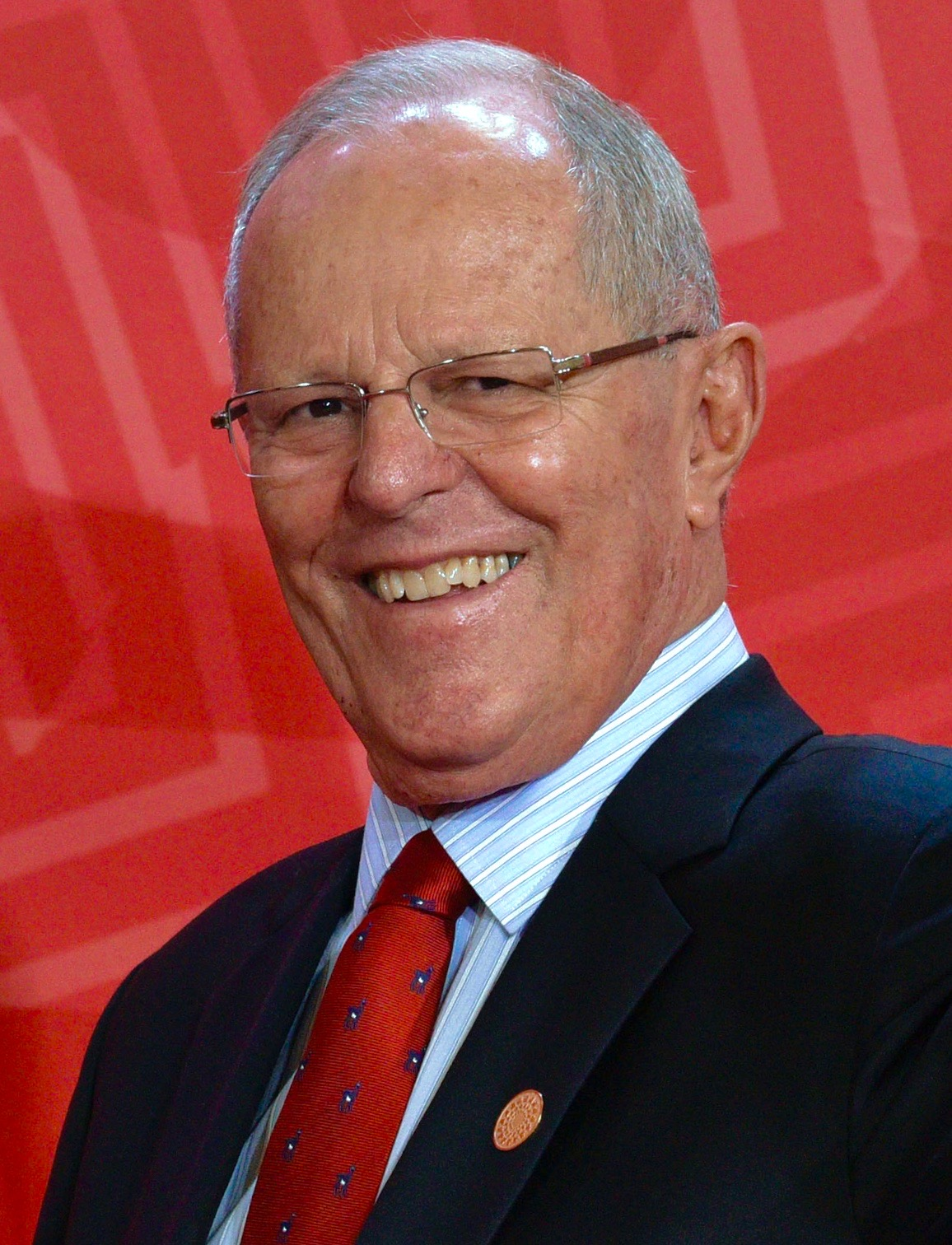
Pedro Pablo Kuczynski, 86th President of Peru (2016-2018)

=== Sciences ===
- Anthony Atala – medical doctor and professor; Peruvian born, and American raised.
- Carlos Bustamante – biologist
- Carlos Castaneda – philosopher
- Carlos I. Noriega – astronaut
- Wenceslaus Sarmiento – also known as W.A. Sarmiento, Peruvian-born American modernist architect
- Barton Zwiebach – physicist working on string theory

=== Journalism ===
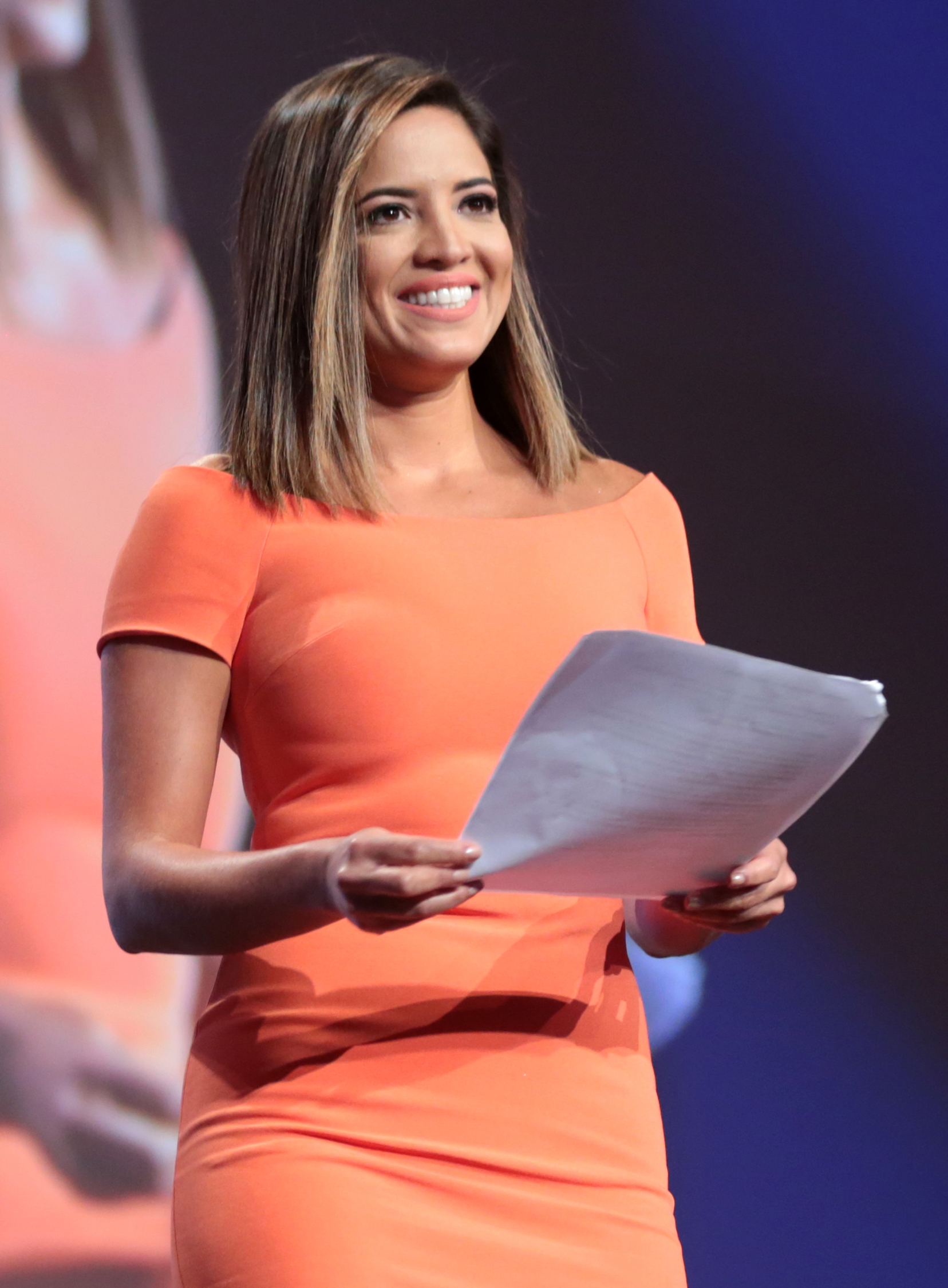
Pamela Silva, journalist and news anchor

- Daniel Alarcón – Peruvian born, American raised author
- Marie Arana – editor, journalist and Peruvian born author
- Mandalit del Barco – general assignment reporter for National Public Radio
- Monica Brown (author) – children's book author, Peruvian on her mother's side
- Lorenzo O'Brien – writer-producer
- Alex Kuczynski – journalist
- Jaime Bayly – writer, journalist and television presenter
- Pamela Silva, journalist

=== Other ===
- Arthur Chin – America's first flying ace in World War II
- McKenna DeBever – swimmer
- Jesús Luzardo – professional baseball player
- David Utrilla – 31st member of the Utah Corps of Consuls

== See also ==
- Peru–United States relations
