= Luis Camara Manoel =

Portuguese-American technologist, humanitarian, and diplomat

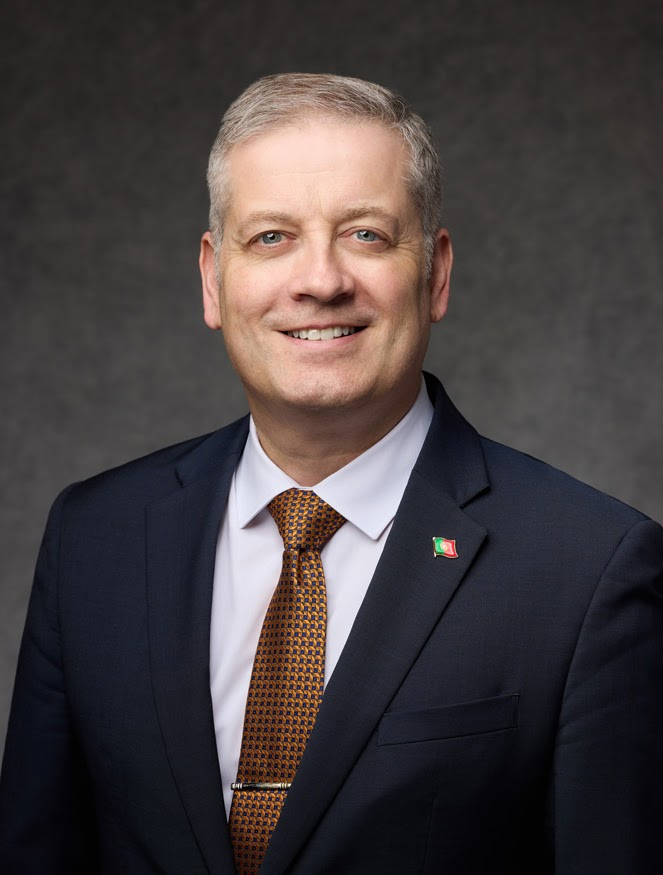
- Born: 21 July 1971 (age 55); Évora, Portugal
- Education: B.A. International Relations, MBA
- Alma mater: Brigham Young University
- Occupations: Technologist, Humanitarian, Diplomat
- Spouse: Angela Camara Manoel
- Children: 4
- Website: https://portugalemutah.org

Luis Eduardo Vitorino da Camara Manoel (born July 21, 1971) is a Portuguese American technologist, humanitarian worker and a citizen diplomat. He currently serves as the first Honorary Consul of Portugal in the State of Utah, a role he assumed in 2023, following his appointment by Portugal’s Ministry of Foreign Affairs in 2023 and approval by the United States Department of State in 2024. According to data from the 2020 U.S. Census, the Honorary Consulate of Portugal in the State of Utah serves an estimated diaspora of more than 6,000 Portuguese and Portuguese-descendants.

== Early life and education ==
Great-grandson of José Eduardo de Calça e Pina da Câmara Manoel, Luis Câmara Manoel was born in Évora, Portugal, to Eduardo Alfredo Dias Camara Manoel, an agricultural engineer, and Maria José de Almeida Vitorino, an educator.He grew up in Setúbal, Portugal, and participated in Scouting during his youth. From 1991 to 1993, he served as a missionary for The Church of Jesus Christ of Latter-day Saints in northern Portugal. In 1993, he married Angela Marie Fawson in Salt Lake City, and they are the parents of four children.

Camara Manoel earned a bachelor's degree in international relations from Brigham Young University (BYU) and later completed a Masters of Business Administration at the University of Phoenix.

== Career ==
=== Technology ===
In 1998, Camara Manoel co‑founded KeyScouter.com, a social‑networking platform oriented toward families involved in scouting. He later worked at Novell. In 2005 joined Microsoft, relocating to Washington state, where he remained for ten years.

==== Patents and Publications ====
At Microsoft, Camara Manoel was awarded two U.S. patents concerning the dynamic allocation and assignment of virtual environments in data centers. During this period, he also authored several technical articles, addressing common issues in information‑systems management and solutions based on Microsoft technologies.

In 2008, eWeek magazine covered Camara Manoel's presentation on Microsoft SharePoint technology compliance, at the Microsoft TechEd conference in Orlando, Florida.

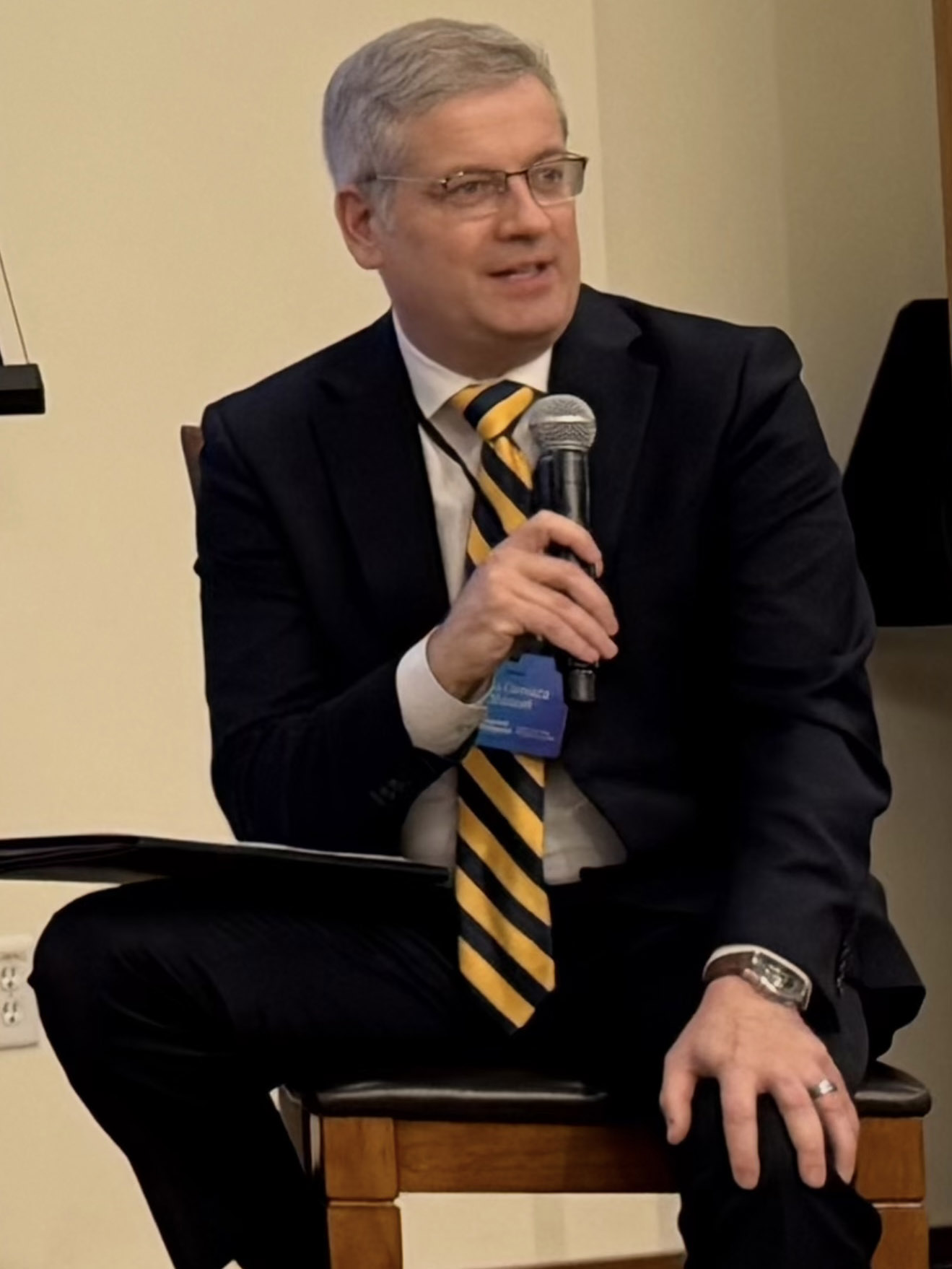
Luis Camara Manoel addresses audience at Artificial Intelligence Conference

=== International Development and Humanitarian Efforts ===
Camara Manoel has participated in international development initiatives since 2014. He served as chairman of the board of Iduka USA, a crowdfunding platform that supports post‑secondary education in developing countries.

In 2015, Camara Manoel returned to Utah, where he began working for The Church of Jesus Christ of Latter‑day Saints. In this capacity, he leads teams that develop programs related to livelihoods, food security, access to clean water, maternal health and child nutrition, literacy, and education.

==== Notable Coverage ====
In 2015, Camara Manoel gave an interview to the RTP2 program A Fé dos Homens, in which he discussed the Perpetual Education Fund, an educational program that provides support to university students.

In Sierra Leone, in September 2023, AVY News Television aired a one‑hour program in which Camara Manoel discussed the importance of nutrition for maternal health and early childhood development.

In June 2025, Camara Manoel was again interviewed on A Fé dos Homens, where he provided an overview of the Church’s humanitarian efforts and operations.

==== Conference Addresses and Panel Participation ====
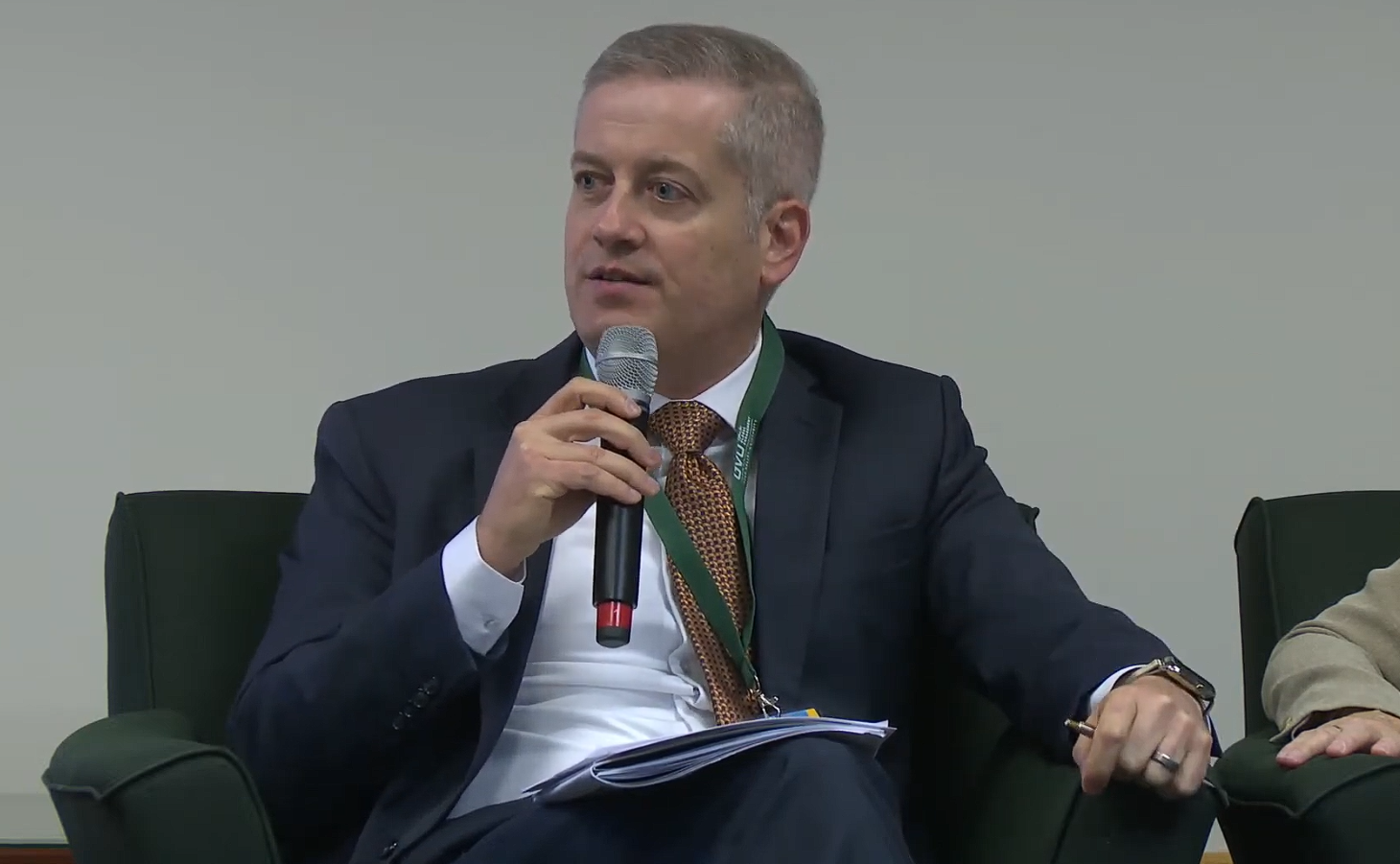
Luis Camara Manoel, addressing the audience at UN's Sustainable Development Goals Conference

In October 2022, he participated in a panel on child nutrition and food security, at the first International Academic Conference on the United Nations Sustainable Development Goals. Camara Manoel presented a perspective emphasizing partnerships and community-based approaches.

In November 2025, he participated in a panel of technologists, data scientists, and educators at the Organized Intelligence conference, held in Salt Lake City, Utah. During the session, he discussed the role of artificial intelligence in international development and humanitarian efforts, noting that AI can assist with the technical complexities of humanitarian work, but stated that AI “cannot replace the human in humanitarian.”

=== Diplomacy ===
US and Portugal diplomatic ties date to the earliest years of the United States, when Portugal recognized US independence in 1791.

==== Appointment ====
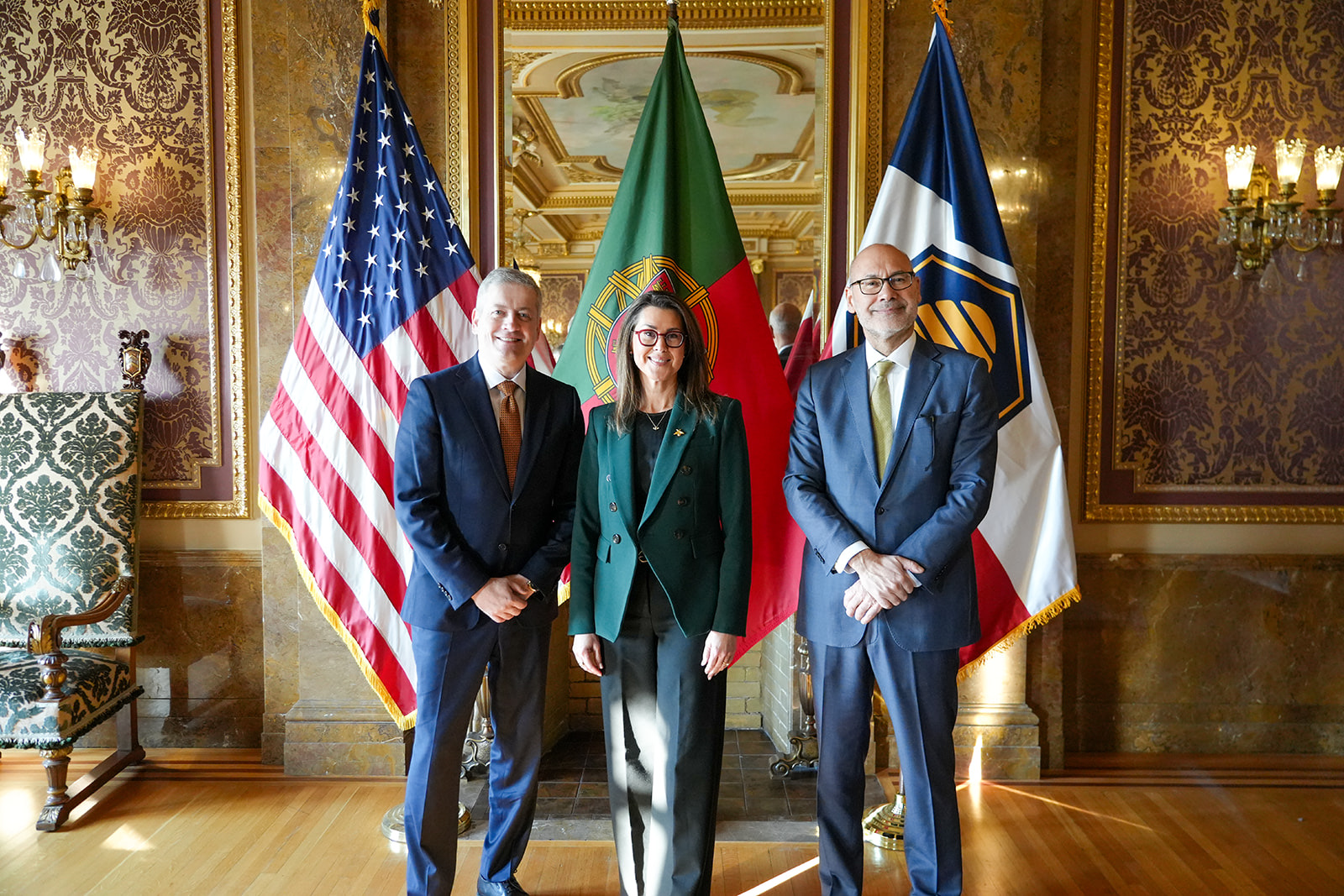
Luis Camara Manoel, Honorary Consul of Portugal, with Utah's Lieutenant Governor and Portuguese Ambassador

On July 7, 2023, Camara Manoel was appointed Portugal's first Honorary Consul to the state of Utah, following a nomination by Ambassador Francisco Duarte Lopes and an official appointment by Portugal's Minister of Foreign Affairs, João Gomes Cravinho. The appointment was approved by the U.S. Department of State on August 20, 2024, and Camara Manoel took office on January 15, 2026, in Salt Lake City, in a ceremony presided over by Ambassador Francisco Duarte Lopes.

==== Major Initiatives ====
In January 2025, Camara Manoel hosted a four-day diplomatic mission to Utah by Ambassador Francisco Duarte Lopes and Consul General, Filipe Ramalheira. The delegation held meetings with Utah Lieutenant Governor Deidre Henderson, members of the Utah State Senate, representatives of the Church of Jesus Christ of Latter-day Saints, and academic institutions.

Later in 2025, Camara Manoel spoke with journalist Paula Machado, marking the inauguration of the Portuguese Heritage Alliance of Utah, Utah's first cultural association focused on Portuguese heritage in Utah.

==== Notable Coverage ====
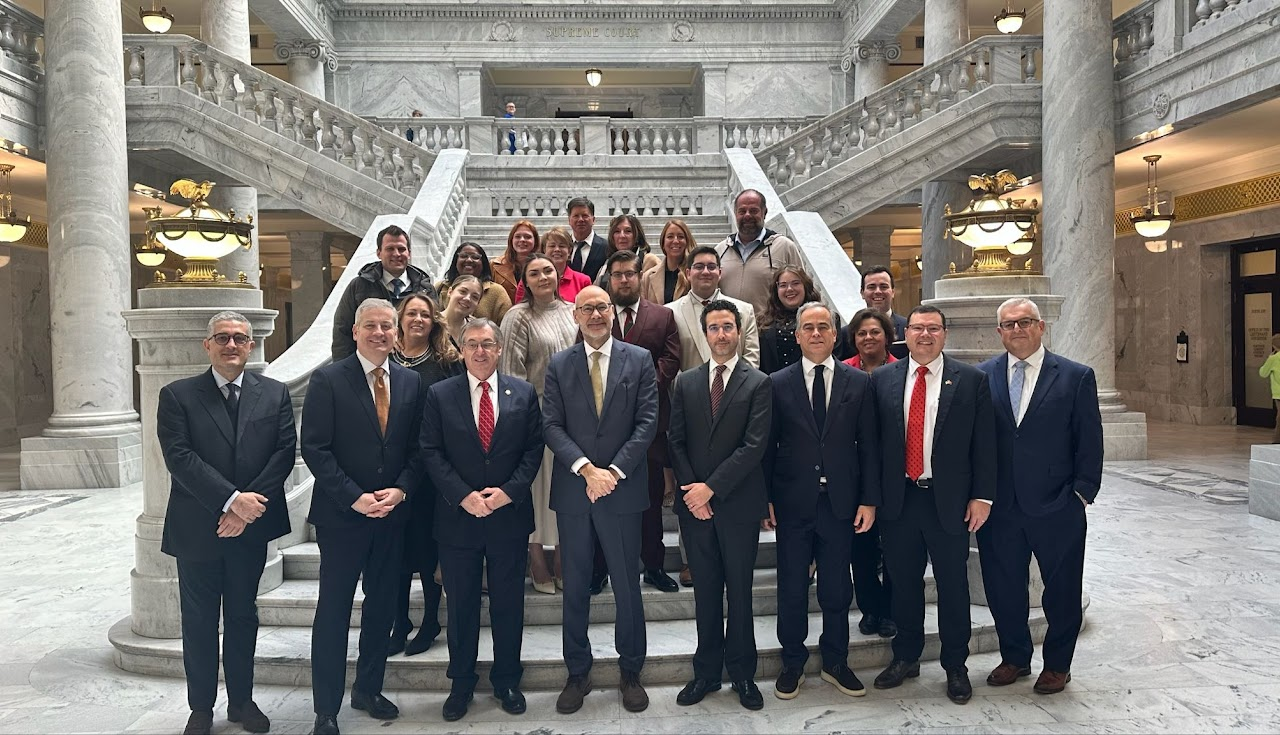
Inauguration of the Honorary Consul of Portugal in Utah

Since his appointment, Camara Manoel has appeared in multiple articles and interviews with RDP Internacional, and Hora dos Portugueses, a national television program broadcast by RTP1, These media appearances discussed the growth of Utah's Portuguese community, and the objectives of the honorary consulate.

In December 2025, the Utah Consular Corps profiled Camara Manoel in an article titled "The Accidental Diplomat: How Luis Camara Manoel is Building a Portuguese Home in the Heart of Utah." The piece traces Camara Manoel's diplomatic journey from the moment of his appointment to the present and revisits the unexpected public announcement of his consular designation during a reception for the President of Portugal, Marcelo Rebelo de Sousa, in San Diego.

== Personal Interests ==
Camara Manoel served as a volunteer in the Scouting movement for more than 20 years. In 2003, the Boy Scouts of America awarded him the Silver Beaver Award, which recognizes adults who have provided distinguished service to youth at the council level. He is also certified as an open‑water scuba diver.
