= Jorge Benítez =

Jorge Benítez may refer to:

- Jorge Duilio Benítez (born 1927), Paraguayan football attacking midfielder
- Jorge Benitez (American soccer) (born 1942), American soccer forward
- Jorge Benítez (Argentine footballer) (born 1950), Argentine football midfielder
- Jorge Benítez (Paraguayan footballer) (born 1992), Paraguayan football forward
