= Vértiz (surname) =

Vértiz is a surname. Notable people with the surname include:

- Juan José de Vértiz y Salcedo (1719–1799), Spanish colonial politician
- Natalie Vértiz (born 1991), Peruvian beauty pageant winner and model
- Pedro Suárez Vértiz (born 1968), Peruvian singer-songwriter and guitarist
- Virginia Castlen Vértiz (born 1949), American researcher and humanitarian
