= Miss Perú 2011 =

- Date: June 25, 2011
- Presenters: Coco Beleván and María Julia Mantilla
- Entertainment: Melissa Miró Quesada
- Venue: Real Felipe Fortress Convention Center, Callao, Peru
- Broadcaster: Panamericana Televisión
- Entrants: 24
- Placements: 12
- Winner: Natalie Vértiz; USA Peru

Miss Perú 2011, the 59th Miss Perú 2011 pageant was held at the Real Felipe Fortress Convention Center, in Callao, Peru on June 25, 2011. At the end of this event Giuliana Zevallos, Miss Perú 2010 and Alexandra Liao, Miss Perú World 2010 crowned their successors Natalie Vértiz and Odilia García respectively. Around 24 contestants from all over the country competed for the titles and the pageant was broadcast live on Panamericana Televisión.

== Results ==
=== Placements ===
Placement	Contestant
Miss Peru 2011	USA Peru – Natalie Diane Vértiz González
Miss Perú World 2011	Junín – Odilia Garcia
1st Runner-Up	Loreto – Nicole Faverón
2nd Runner-Up	Amazonas – Giselle Patrón
3rd Runner-Up	Region Lima – Cindy Mejia Santamaría
4th Runner-Up	Trujillo – Stefani Bueno
Top 12	Pasco – Della Rivera; Villa Rica – Katerine Villayzan; Apurímac – Carmen Vizcarra; Tumbes – Lia Lemor; Huánuco – Kenia Brack; Distrito Capital – Grace Mejía

== Special awards ==
- Best Regional Costume - Cuzco - Miluska Huaroto
- Miss Photogenic - Pasco - Della Rivera
- Miss Elegance - Loreto - Nicole Faverón
- Miss Body - USA Peru - Natalie Vértiz
- Best Hair - Amazonas - Giselle Patrón
- Miss Congeniality - San Martin - Sofía Cornejo
- Most Beautiful Face - Pasco - Della Rivera
- Best Smile - Junín - Odilia García
- Miss Internet - Tacna - Sherina Ruiz
- Miss Talent Show - Villa Rica - Katerine Villayzan

== Delegates ==
- Amazonas - Giselle Patrón
- Apurimac - Carmen Vizcarra
- Arequipa - Adriana Conde
- Ayacucho - Yessenia Espinoza
- Cajamarca - Roxana Díaz
- Callao - Mayra Farje
- Cuzco - Miluska Huaroto
- Distrito Capital - Grace Mejía
- Huancavelica - Wendy Llanos
- Huánuco - Kenia Brack
- Junín - Odilia García
- La Libertad - Gisela Torres
- Lambayeque - Luciana Onetti
- Loreto - Nicole Faverón
- Moquegua - Tamara Zapata
- Pasco - Della Rivera
- Piura - Carla Gutiérrez
- Region Lima - Cindy Mejía Santamaría
- San Martín - Sofia Cornejo
- Tacna - Sherina Ruiz
- Trujillo - Stefani Bueno Obado
- Tumbes - Lia Lemor
- USA Peru - Natalie Vértiz
- Villa Rica - Katerine Villayzan

== Judges ==
- Félix Moreno - Regional President of Constitutional Province of Callao
- Gudmer Chacón - Kinesiologist
- Anahí - Mexican singer
- Alexander Gonzáles - personal trainer
- Luis Miguel Ciccia - manager of Transportes CIVA
- Walter Cruzálegui - plastic surgeon
- Roselia Strocchia - Mrs. Venezuela International 2011
- Olga Zumarán - Miss Perú Universe 1978
- Victor Hugo Montalvo - Manager of MONTALVO Salon & Spa
- Carlos Montalvo - Manager of MONTALVO Salon & Spa
- Luis Alberto Roy - Manager of "Personal Training GYM"
- Maripili Barreda - Peruvian actress
- Juan Sotomayor García - Mayor of Bellavista District

== Background music ==
- Opening Number - Katy Perry - "Firework"
- Swimsuit Competition - Katy Perry - "Teenage Dream" & "California Gurls"
- Evening Gown Competition - Paul Michael Glaser, Michele Marsh & Topol - "Sunrise, Sunset"
