= Utah Consular Corps =

Consular and diplomatic organization in Utah, USA

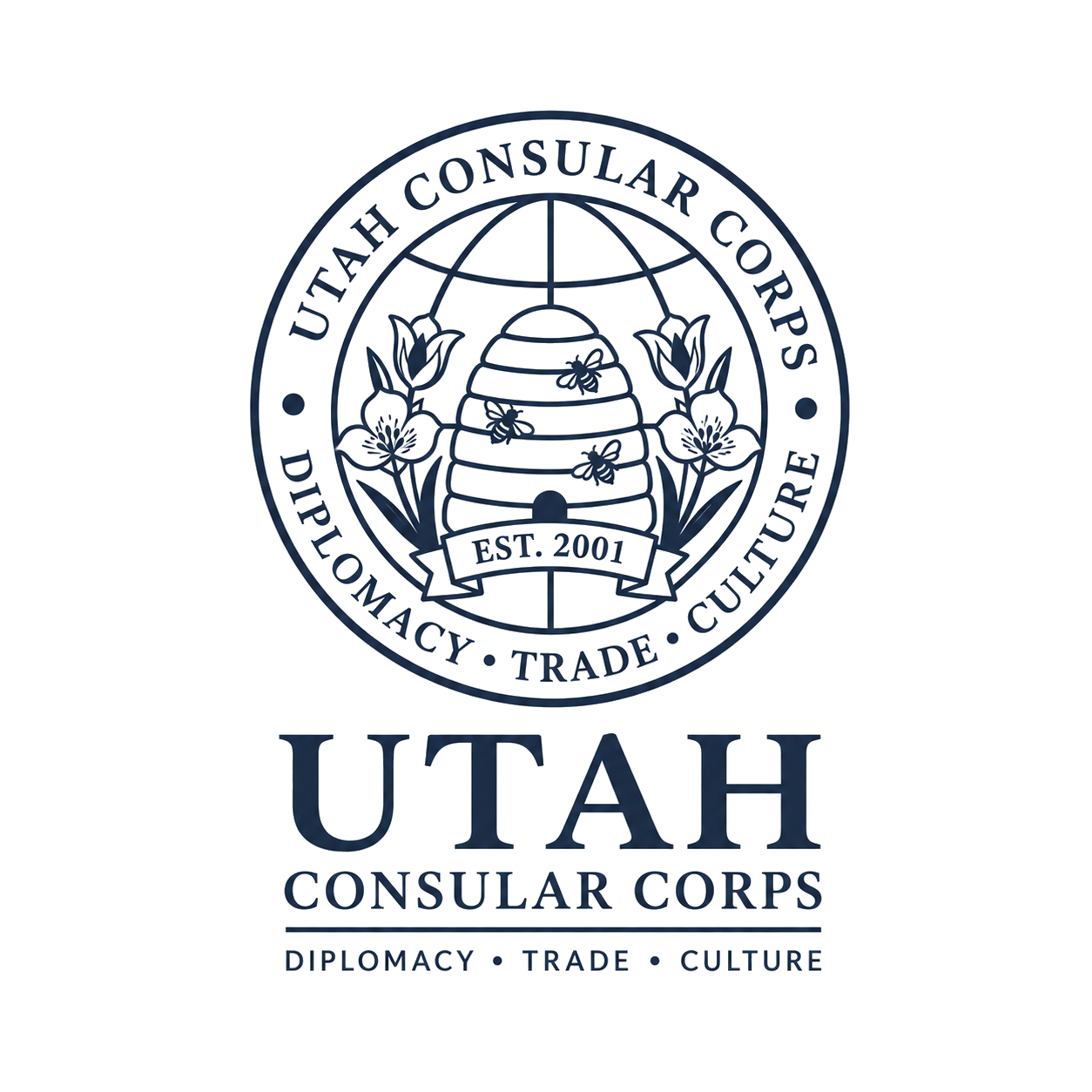
- Logo of the UCC
- Location: Salt Lake City, Utah
- Opened: 2001
- Jurisdiction: State of Utah
- Website: utahconsuls.org

The Utah Consular Corps (UCC) is a professional organization of accredited career and honorary consular officers residing in the State of Utah. Established in 2001, the organization serves as the primary liaison between the international diplomatic community and the state, business sectors, and academic institutions of Utah.

== History ==
The Utah Consular Corps was founded in 2001, primarily in response to the upcoming 2002 Winter Olympics in Salt Lake City. During the planning phases of the Games, participating nations identified a critical need for local consular services to assist their athletes, officials, and visiting citizens.

Following the conclusion of the Olympics, the UCC transitioned into a permanent non-profit organization to support the state's growing international presence and economic interests. Since its inception, the Corps has expanded from a small group of representatives to a robust body representing approximately 30 nations across Europe, Asia, Africa, and the Americas.

== Mission and Responsibilities ==
The mission of the UCC is to promote and coordinate the activities of the consular

representatives in Utah while fostering international goodwill. The Corps operates across three primary pillars:

- Consular Services: Facilitating the issuance of visas, passports, and birth registrations. Consuls also provide critical assistance to foreign nationals in distress, such as those hospitalized or detained, and act as official liaisons with local law enforcement.
- Commercial Development: Working closely with World Trade Center Utah and the Governor's Office of Economic Development (GOED) to promote bilateral trade. Members frequently assist in hosting foreign trade delegations and accompanying Utah business leaders on overseas trade missions.
- Cultural and Educational Exchange: Facilitating academic partnerships between Utah universities and foreign institutions. The UCC also supports cultural festivals and tourism initiatives to increase Utah's global visibility.

== Membership and Accreditation ==
Members of the Utah Consular Corps are formally nominated by their respective sending countries and must be vetted and accredited by the U.S. Department of State. Membership is divided into two categories:

=== Career Consuls ===
Career consuls are full-time members of their country's foreign service. They are professional diplomats sent by their home government to manage consulate-general offices. In Utah, Mexico, El Salvador, and Peru maintain career consulates.

=== Honorary Consuls ===
Honorary consuls are often local residents or U.S. citizens with deep ties to the country they represent. While they hold official diplomatic status and perform many of the same functions as career consuls, they generally serve in a voluntary capacity without a salary from the sending nation.

== Leadership ==
The Utah Consular Corps (UCC) is governed by a structured leadership hierarchy designed to facilitate diplomatic relations between the State of Utah and the foreign governments represented within its borders.

=== Presidency and Executive Board ===
The leadership of the UCC is centered around the Presidency, which consists of a President and a Vice President. These two officers also comprise the core of the Executive Board.

- President: Serves a two-year term, acting as the primary representative and spokesperson for the Corps in official functions and meetings with state and local government officials.
- Vice President: Serves as the second-in-line official, assisting the President in their duties and assuming the role of President in their absence or should the position become vacant.

=== The Dean of the Corps ===
The position of Dean is an honorary and functional role held by the longest serving consul within the Utah Consular Corps. The Dean serves as the "first among equals" (primus inter pares) and provides institutional memory, mentorship, and guidance to newer members of the diplomatic community.

=== Advisory and Support Roles ===
The governance of the Corps is further supported by specific advisory positions to ensure continuity and professional administration:

- Consul General Advisors: These are career consuls who give advice and support to the executive board.
- Advisor: Serving at the pleasure of the Presidency as its "Chief of Staff," this position provides both strategic counsel and high-level administrative leadership to the Executive Committee. The role is defined by a sophisticated mastery of international protocol and state-level governance, requiring a nuanced understanding of both honorary and career consular functions. Beyond managing day-to-day operations and logistical coordination, the incumbent acts as the primary liaison and "face" of the Corps to the local community.

== Represented Nations ==
As of 2026, the Utah Consular Corps includes representatives from the following nations:

Region	Represented Countries
Americas	Brazil, Canada, Chile, El Salvador, Mexico, Peru, Guatemala
Europe	Austria, Belgium, Czech Republic, Denmark, Finland, France, Germany, Hungary, Iceland, Italy, Latvia, Luxembourg, Norway, Portugal, Romania, Spain, Sweden, Switzerland, Ukraine, United Kingdom
Asia/Africa	Indonesia, Japan, South Korea, Morocco, Djibouti, New Zealand

== Awards ==
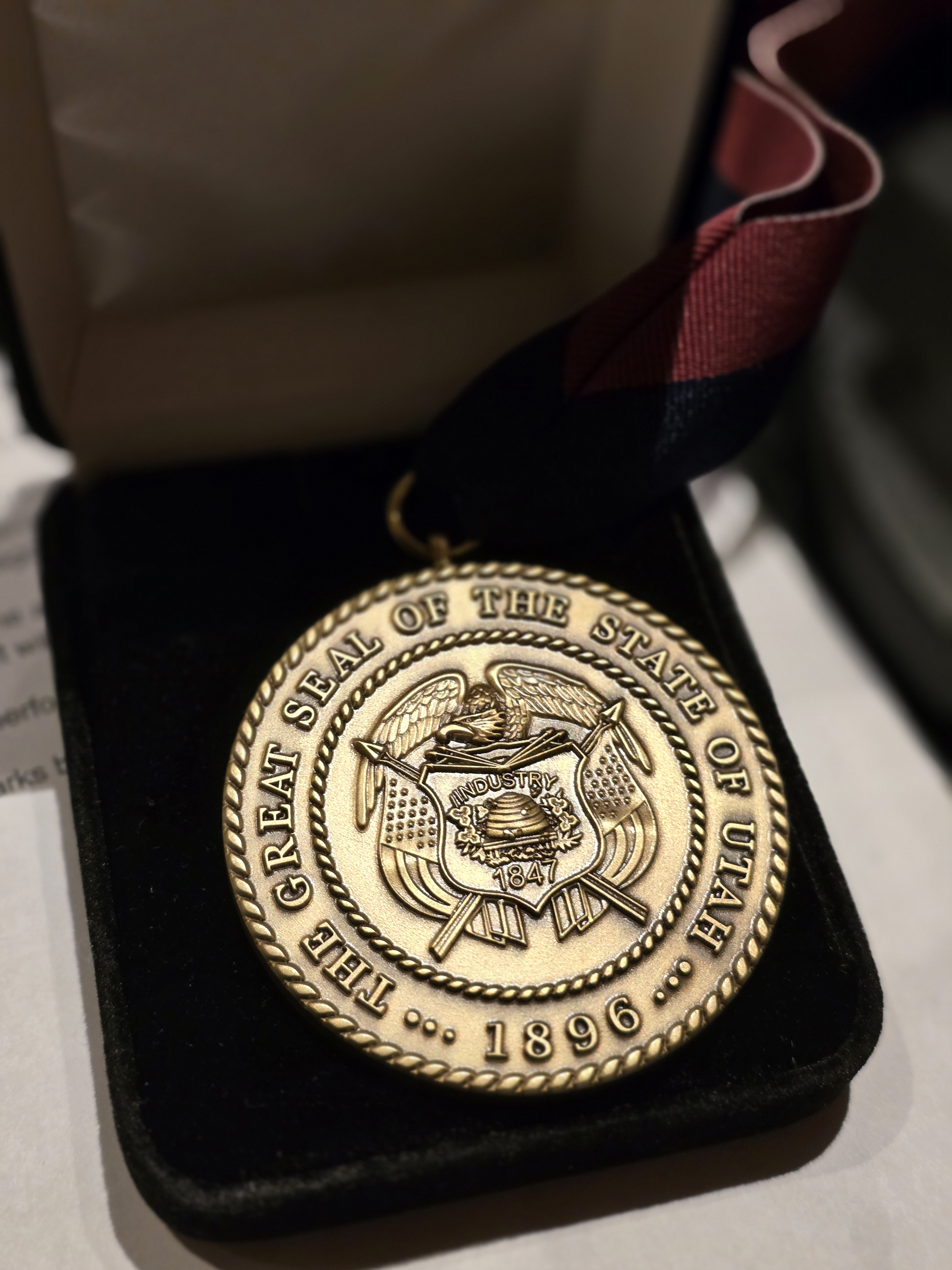
Medal of the Utah Diplomatic Service Award with the Great Seal of Utah

The Utah Consular Corps recognizes contributions to international relations and community service through two primary honors: the Utah Diplomatic Service Award and the Distinguished Service Award. These awards acknowledge diplomats and community partners whose work supports the state’s international engagement.

=== Utah Diplomatic Service Award ===
Established on December 14, 2023, the Utah Diplomatic Service Award is the highest recognition bestowed by the State of Utah for diplomatic excellence. Formally created by the Utah State Legislature during the Corps' inaugural gala, the award honors individuals who have demonstrated exceptional leadership in fostering robust relations between the international community and the state.

The inaugural recipients of this award were:

- Gary J. Neeleman: Retiring Honorary Consul of Brazil, recognized for his extensive tenure and impact on South American-Utah relations.
- David Utrilla: Retiring Honorary Consul of Peru, honored for his leadership within the consular community and diplomatic service.

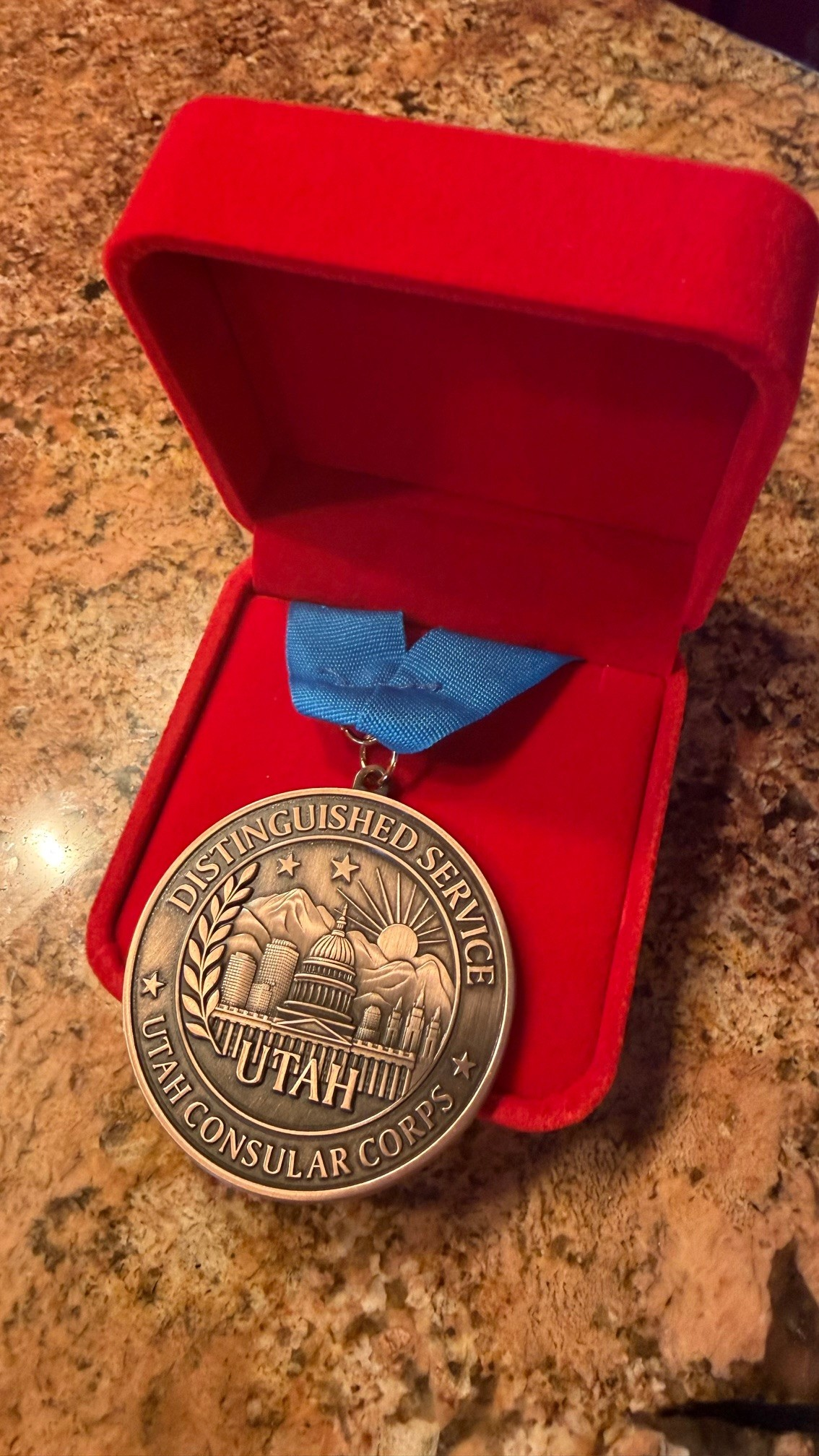
Utah Consular Corps Distinguished Service Award

=== Distinguished Service Award ===
During its final quarterly meeting of 2025, the Utah Consular Corps voted to establish the Distinguished Service Award. Unlike the Diplomatic Service Award, which recognizes contributions to high‑level statecraft, this award is intended for individuals who have supported the Corps in advancing its organizational objectives and contributed to public service efforts in Utah

The first award was presented posthumously to Honorary Consul George Simon in recognition of his long-term involvement with the Corps and his service within the local community.

== Gallery ==
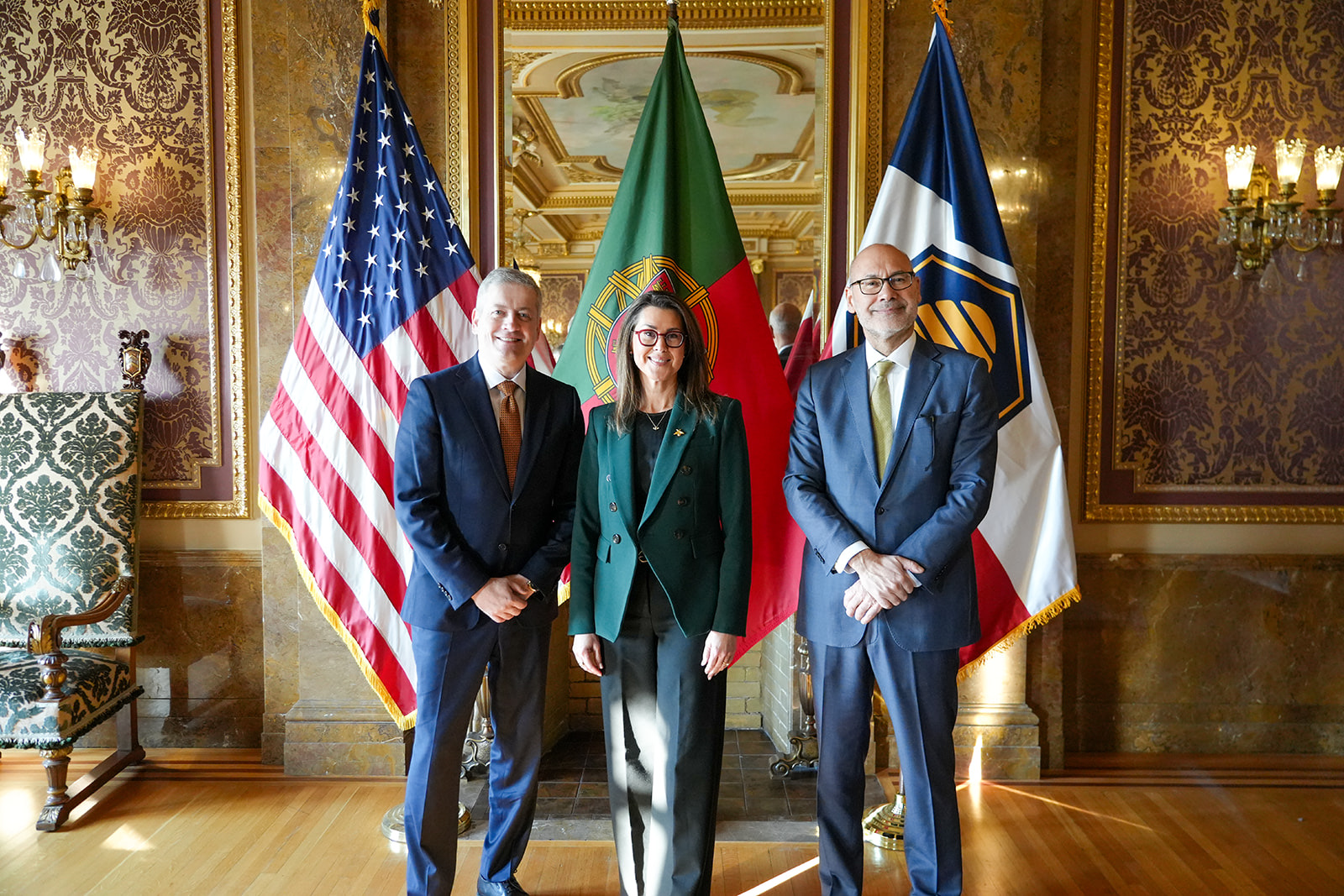

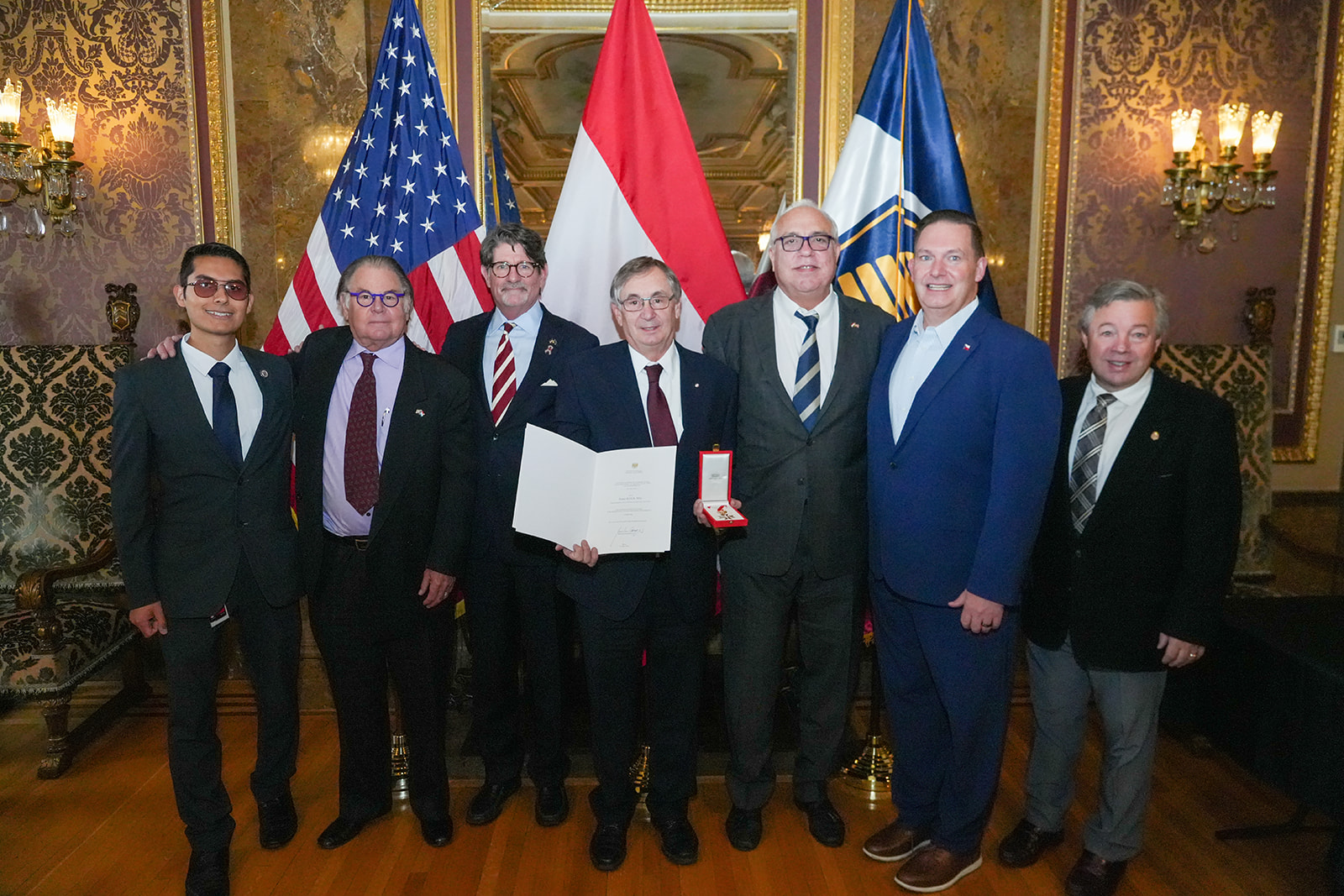

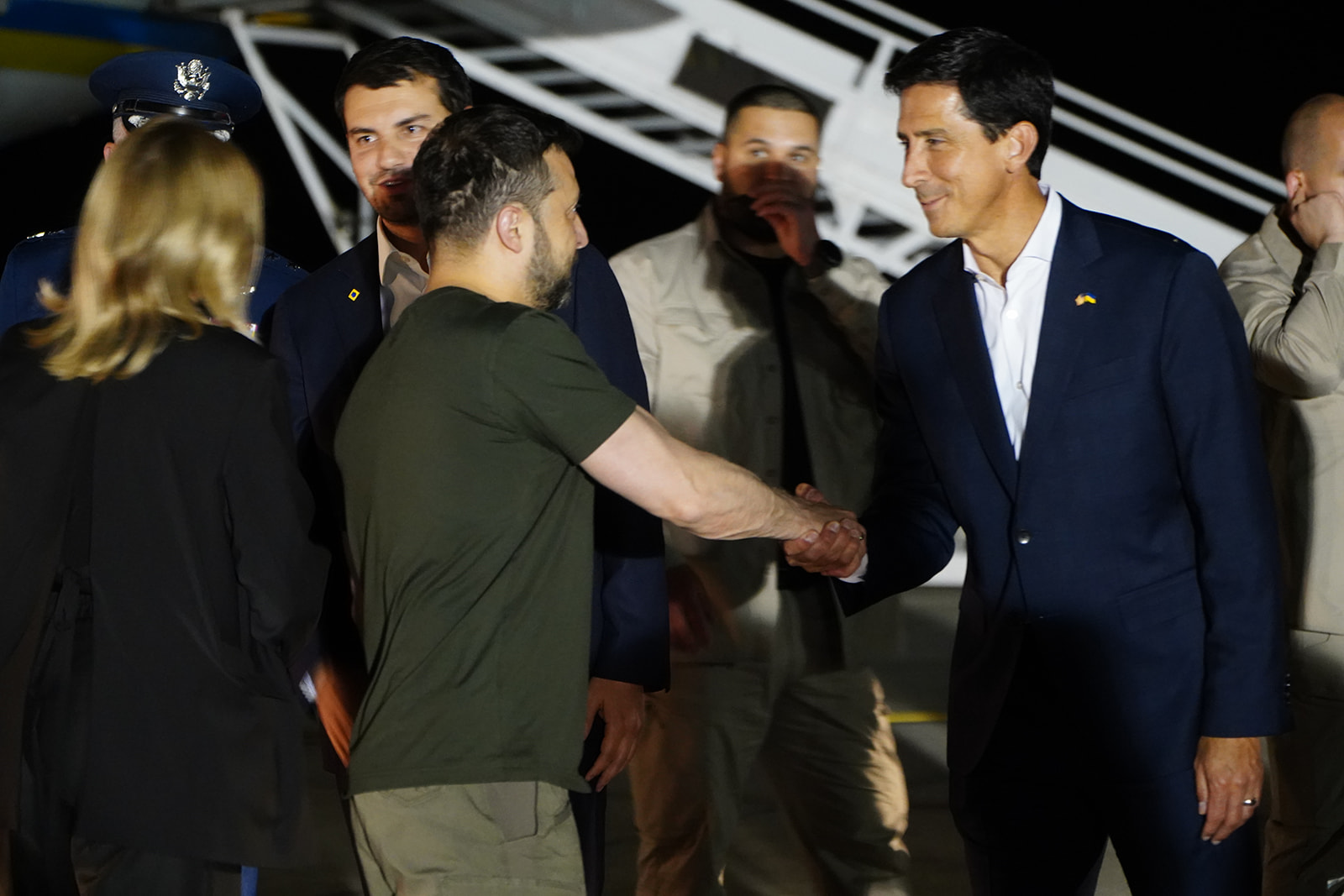

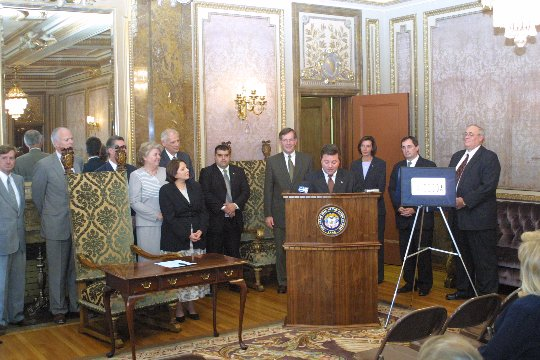
