= Giselle Patrón =

Peruvian model and actress (born 1987)

Giselle Patrón Brunet
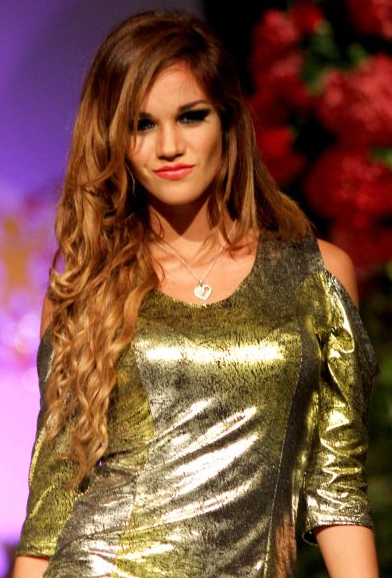
- Born: Giselle Patrón Brunet; April 9, 1987 (age 38); Lima, Peru
- Occupations: Model, actress
- Modeling information
- Height: 1.78 m (5 ft 10 in)
- Hair color: Light Brown
- Eye color: Hazel/Brown

Giselle Patrón (born 9 April 1987 in Lima) is a Peruvian model and actress.

Her mother is from France, and her paternal grandparents were from Italy. She has posed for magazines such as Maxim, SoHo and Cosas Hombre.

For TV, she has acted in the series Corazón de fuego.

== Beauty contests ==
- Miss Hawaiian Tropic Perú 2009: Winner
- Miss Hawaiian Tropic 2009: Contestant
- Miss Peru 2011 as Miss Amazonas: Fourth Place
- Miss Bikini International 2011: Runner-up. Winner the title Miss Charming and Miss Fotogénica
- Miss Caraïbes Hibiscus 2011: Winner the title "Miss Captain Oliver's Resort"

== Credits ==
Year	Title	Media	Role	Notes
2010	Habacilar	TV	Model	One season
2011	Las aventuras de Charlie y Dolly	Theatre	Sleeping Beauty	
2012	Desafío sin fronteras	TV	Model	
2012	Corazón de fuego	TV	Patrick's date	Guest star
