= Pamela Silva =

Peruvian-American journalist (born 1981)

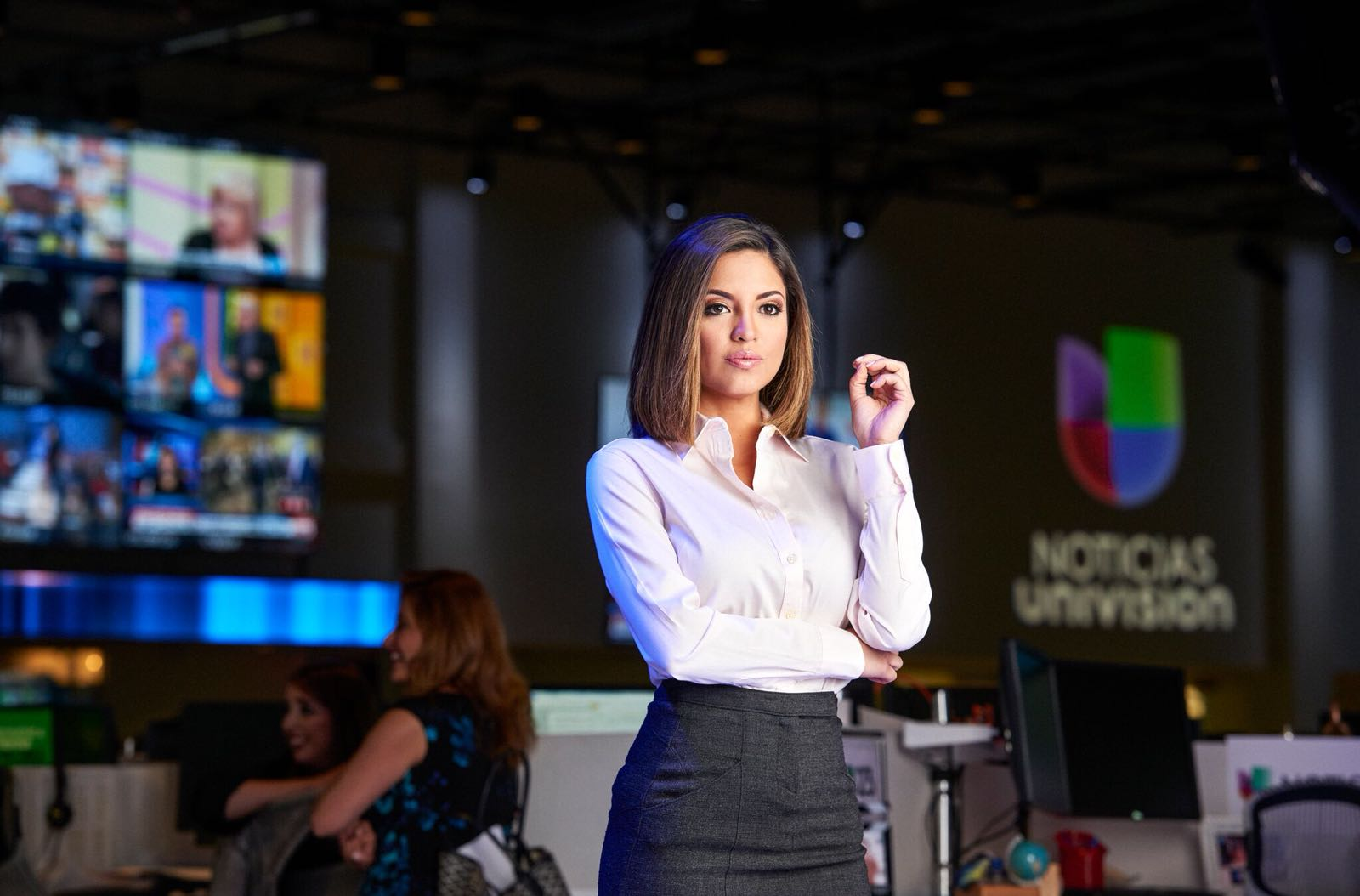
- Silva in 2017
- Born: August 16, 1981 (age 44); Lima, Peru
- Education: Florida International University (BA, MBA); St. Thomas University (GrDip)
- Years active: 2003–present
- Spouse: Cesar Conde (m. 2009; div. 2020)
- Children: 1

Pamela Silva (born August 16, 1981) is a Peruvian-American, multiple Emmy Award-winning journalist and co-anchor of the Univision Network's weekday newsmagazine, Primer Impacto, based in Miami. During her marriage to media executive Cesar Conde from 2009 to 2020, she was known as Pamela Silva Conde.

== Early life ==
Pamela Silva was born in Lima to her mother, Rosario, and lived there until she was nine. Her father died in a car accident the day before she was born. She graduated from Florida International University in Miami in 2003. As a senior broadcast journalism major, she served as a Miami Dolphins Cheerleader.

== Professional career ==
Silva began her career at Univision in 2003 as a public affairs coordinator and producer for the community affairs show Miami Ahora (Miami Now) at WLTV 23. She also worked as a guest reporter for Univision Network shows, including El Gordo y La Flaca (The Fat Man and The Skinny Woman), Despierta America (Wake-Up America) and Control. She was the Miami-based reporter for TeleFutura's Escandalo TV (ShowBiz TV) and the station spokesperson for WAMI TeleFutura 69. She also hosted TeleFutura 69's first local newscast, Noticias en Noventa (News in 90), a 90-second daily segment of news highlights.

In 2005, Silva rejoined the Univision Miami affiliate news team as an entertainment anchor and reporter. She then became a substitute news anchor and was later named main anchor for the leading Spanish-language morning newscast in South Florida, Noticias 23 Al Amanecer. In addition to her duties as a news anchor, she also worked on special feature and investigative reports as a national correspondent for the investigative newsmagazine Aqui y Ahora,, with which she continues collaborating.

In 2011, Univision named her as co-anchor of Primer Impacto.

== Recognition ==
In 2006, she won her first Emmy Award for on-camera work. In 2007, she received three additional Emmy Awards for writing, news feature story, and a human interest story. Two more Emmys followed: in 2009, for a feature story about Facebook, and in 2010 for an investigative special feature. In 2013, she was chosen as one of "People en Español"'s 50 most beautiful people. In May 2013, she was a guest host on ABC's The View. She was presented with the Leading Ladies of Entertainment accolade by the Latin Recording Academy in 2018.

== Personal life ==
In 2012, she received an MBA from Florida International University, where she earned her undergraduate degree. The Pamela Silva Scholarship at FIU's Honors College provides scholarships to first-generation, low-income business or journalism majors.

She married media executive Cesar Conde in 2009. They divorced in 2020. She gave birth to a son, Ford Liam Siberry, in April 2020. Ford's father is snowboarder and her ex-boyfriend Jordan Siberry.

She is a board member of Amigos for Kids, a Miami-based charity focused on preventing child abuse.
