= Cesar Conde =

American media executive

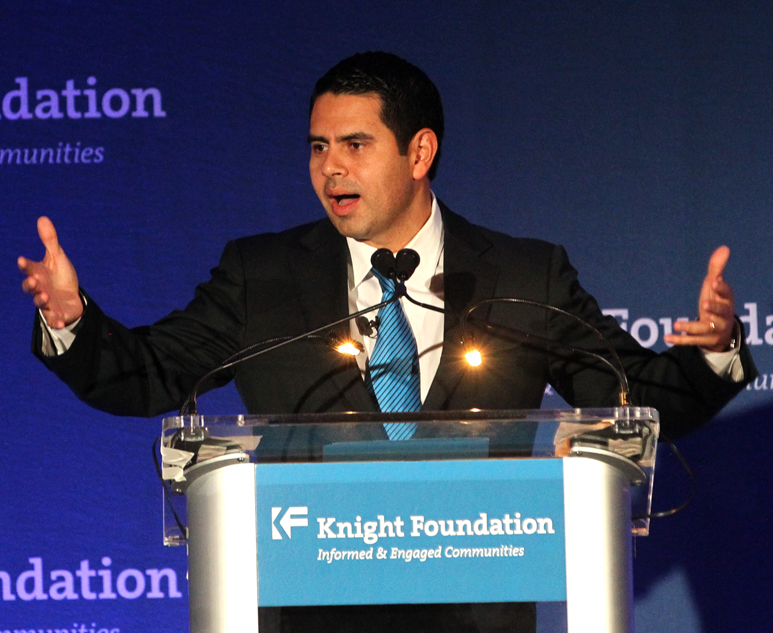
- Conde in 2013
- Born: New York City, U.S.
- Education: Harvard University (BA); University of Pennsylvania (MBA)
- Spouse: Pamela Silva (m. 2009; div. 2020)

Cesar Conde is an American media executive who is chairman of the NBCUniversal News Group. Prior to this, Conde was chairman of NBCUniversal International Group and NBCUniversal Telemundo Enterprises. Before that, he was president of Univision's networks division.

== Early life and education ==
Cesar Conde was born in New York City and grew up in Miami. His father, Cesar A. Conde, is a cardiologist and an immigrant from Peru, and his mother, Maria Conde, is an immigrant from Cuba. He has two younger brothers, Jorge and Enrique.

He graduated from Belen Jesuit Prep, where he played varsity tennis and was named the Athlete of the Year in 1991 and Sportsman of the Year in 1990. He also played tennis while he was a student at Harvard and co-founded the Cuban-American Undergraduate Students Association in 1994. He graduated from Harvard with an AB degree in history in 1995. Subsequently, Conde went to the Wharton School at the University of Pennsylvania where he earned an MBA in 1999.

== Career ==
Cesar Conde was named chairman of the NBCUniversal News Group in May 2020. Under Conde's leadership, the NBCU News Group made substantial investments in digital and streaming, became the only news organization to run three major streaming channels, and achieved historic ratings milestones.

Conde is the first Hispanic to lead a major English-language television news organization. He launched the Fifty Percent Challenge, which aims to promote diversity in the newsroom. He also helped launch NBCU Academy, a journalism training program for college students. NBCU Academy partners with academic institutions and provides funding to prepare students for a career in journalism.

In October 2013, Conde joined NBCUniversal as executive vice president to oversee NBCU International and NBCU Digital Enterprises. Prior to NBCUniversal, Conde was the President of Univision Networks and held senior executive capacities at the company. He is credited with transforming the Spanish-language media company into a leading global, multi-platform media brand.

Conde served as a White House Fellow for Secretary of State Colin L. Powell from 2002 to 2003. He also worked for StarMedia Network, the first internet company focused on Spanish and Portuguese-speaking audiences globally, and in the mergers & acquisitions group at Salomon Smith Barney.

== Education initiatives ==
In 2005 he co-founded the Futuro Program, a non-profit organization that provides role models and educational workshops to Hispanic high school students.

In 2009, Conde spearheaded the launch of Univision's "Es el Momento" (The moment is now) campaign, a comprehensive effort focused on informing the Hispanic community of the importance of education. The campaign received support from the Bill and Melinda Gates Foundation, among other sponsors. In March 2011, a Town Hall event with President Barack Obama was organized and broadcast to over 2.7 million viewers around the country.

In May 2011, President Obama announced the appointment of Conde as a member of the President's Advisory Commission on Educational Excellence for Hispanics and in September 2012, Conde was appointed to the Board of Directors of the Foundation for Excellence in Education

Under Conde's leadership, Telemundo Global Studios (TGS) launched the TGS Fellowship Program, the first-ever premier professional development project for scripted content producers in Hispanic media. It is part of Telemundo Academy, the company's multimedia academic program designed to develop new talent pursuing careers in the media industry starting from the high school age.

== Community initiatives ==
During his time at Univision, Conde led the company to enter into several partnerships that drove national community initiatives and empowerment campaigns. One of these campaigns was "Ya es hora", a historic non-partisan Latino civic participation campaign launched in several phases which encouraged eligible Hispanics to become US Citizens, register to vote and exercise their right to vote.

At Telemundo, Conde was the driving force behind the launch of "El Poder En Ti," a community platform focusing on three areas of importance to U.S. Hispanics: education (Tu Educación), health (Tu Salud), and finance (Tu Dinero). Telemundo's commitment to empower the Hispanic community was reinforced in March 2019 when "Hazte Contar," or "Get Counted," was added under the umbrella of "El Poder en Ti." The campaign seeks to increase participation in the upcoming elections and 2020 Census, which will help improve quality of life through a fair distribution of federal funds.

Conde spearheaded the development of Univision's first ever Teletón USA event, a 28-hour coast-to-coast televised fundraising event that exceeded expectations by raising over 15 million dollars. All proceeds went to help families in the U.S. and toward the construction of the first "Centro de Rehabilitación Infantil Teletón" (CRIT) which will be based in San Antonio, Texas.

== Organizations ==
- Walmart Board of Directors
- PepsiCo Board of Directors
- Aspen Institute, Board of Trustees
- Council on Foreign Relations, Full Member
- The Paley Center for Media, Board of Trustees
- Aspen Institute, Henry Crown Fellow
- Polo Ralph Lauren Board of Directors

== Recognitions ==
Conde is the recipient of numerous awards for his efforts on behalf of the Hispanic community as well as his personal achievements. In 2012, Conde was one of 192 young leaders from 59 countries recognized by the World Economic Forum for their outstanding leadership, professional accomplishments and commitment to society.

- 2018 Broadcasting & Cable Hall of Fame honoree
- 2018 National Association of Television Programming Executives Brandon Tartikoff Legacy Award
- 2017: Center for Communication Frank Stanton Award
- 2017: Sponsors for Educational Opportunity Alumni Award
- Cablefax Most Influential Minorities – 2012, 2013, 2014, 2015, 2016 2017, and 2018
- Cablefax 100 – 2012, 2013, 2014, 2015, 2016 2017, 2018, and 2019
- 2016: Award for Executive Leadership in Hispanic Television & Video from Multichannel News and Broadcasting & Cable.
- 2012: T. Howard Foundation Executive Leadership Award
- 2012: World Economic Forum Young Global Leader
- 2010 Hispanic Scholarship Fund (HSF) Alumni Hall of Fame
- 2009, '10, '11, '12: "40 Under 40", Fortune Magazine
- 2009: Next Generation Leader Award, National Association for Multi-Ethnicity in Communications (NAMIC)
- 2008, '09, '10, '12: "Most influential Hispanics in the US", PODER Magazine
- 2007 Young Hispanic Corporate Achiever Award, Hispanic Association on Corporate Responsibility (HACR)
- Young Leader Award, Cuban-American National Council
- U.S. Hispanic Chamber of Commerce Foundation Award

== Ronna McDaniel hiring ==
On March 22, 2024, it was announced that NBC had hired the former head of the Republican National Committee, Ronna Romney McDaniel. On March 26, 2024, due to widespread outcries over McDaniel's role in attempting to overturn the 2020 election of Joe Biden, including from high profile MSNBC anchors and NBC's Chuck Todd, Conde sent an email to NBC and MSNBC staff saying the network had decided to drop McDaniel.

== Personal life ==
Conde married Univision News Anchor Pamela Silva Conde, a native of Peru, in 2009. They divorced in 2020.

The Conde Media Center at Belen Jesuit Prep, his high school alma mater, is named for his parents, Drs. Maria and Cesar Conde.
