= Natalie Vértiz =

Peruvian-American model (born 1991)

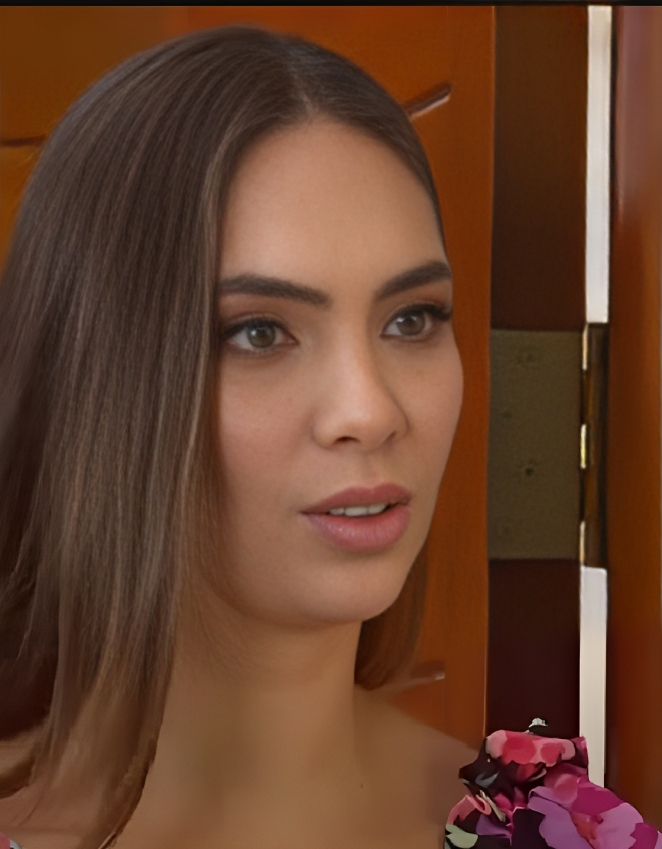
- Vértiz in 2022
- Born: Natalie Diane Vértiz González; September 29, 1991 (age 35); Hollywood, Florida, U.S.
- Occupations: Model, TV celebrity and influencer
- Height: 6 ft 0 in (1.83 m)
- Spouse: Jacobo Eskenazi (m. 2015)
- Children: 2
- Beauty pageant titleholder
- Title: Miss Perú 2011
- Hair color: Brown
- Eye color: Brown
- Major competitions: Nuestra Belleza Latina 2010 (Top 35); Miss USA Perú (Winner); Miss Perú 2011 (Winner); Miss Universe 2011 (Unplaced)

Natalie Diane Vértiz González (born September 29, 1991) is a Peruvian-American TV host, model and beauty pageant titleholder who was crowned Miss Perú 2011 and represented Peru at Miss Universe 2011.

== Early life ==
Vértiz was born in the United States. She is the second daughter of former beauty queen Patricia González and Alberto Vértiz. After moving to Lima, capital of Peru, she studied at the Queen of Angels School and after completing her studies at that school, she moved to the city of Pompano Beach, Florida, where she lived until she was 19 years old.

== Pageants ==
Natalie, who is a resident of Pompano Beach, competed in Miss Perú 2011, representing the Peruvian community in the United States, where she was one of 12 finalists and obtained the title of Miss Perú 2011, as well as the Best Body and Miss Silhouette awards. Her nutritionists and trainers, Christopher Rios, Daniel Rios and Xavier Rios, succeeded with his advisement towards her winning of the "Best Body" Award.

Natalie represented Peru at the Miss Universe 2011 pageant.

== Personal life ==
On March 17, 2014, Vértiz and boyfriend Jacobo (Yaco) Eskenazi Álvarez welcomed a son.

Awards and achievements
Preceded by Giuliana Zevallos	Miss Peru; 2011	Succeeded by Nicole Faverón
