= David Utrilla =

Peruvian businessman

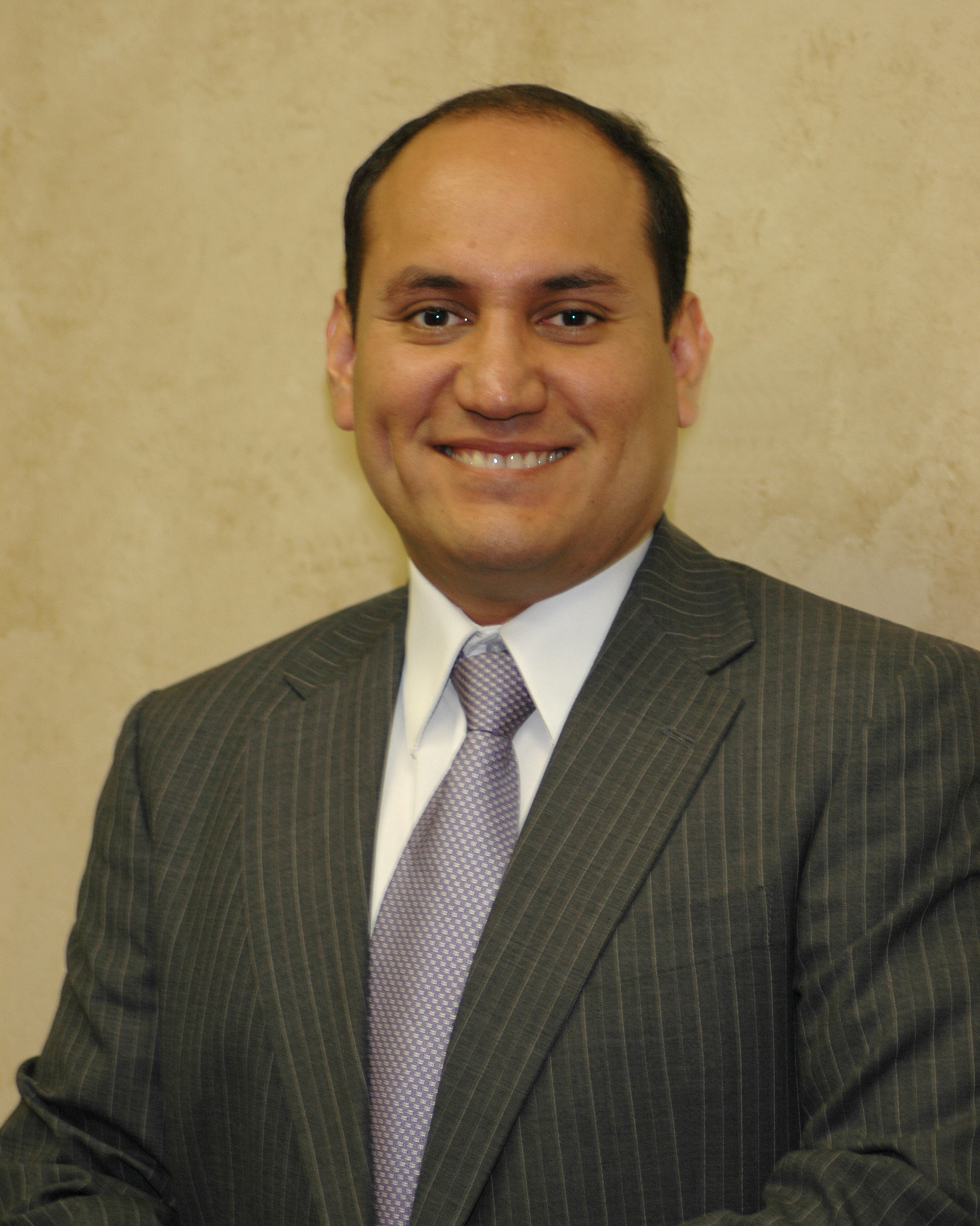
- Born: Lima, Peru
- Occupation(s): CEO, U.S. Translation Company
- Known for: Honorary Consul of Peru

David Utrilla is the 31st member of the Utah Corps of Consuls and Honorary Consul to Peru in Utah. Utrilla is also the owner and CEO of U.S. Translation Company.

Utrilla was officially appointed by the president of Peru, Alan García, and after receiving credentials from the U.S. Department of State, began serving as Utah's Honorary Consul of Peru in 2009. As the Honorary Consul to Peru, Utrilla serves two main purposes: To build and strengthen ties as well as help and promote the local community.

== Biography ==
David Utrilla was born and raised in Lima, Peru. In Lima, he studied international business and economics. In 1994, David immigrated to the United States and attended Weber State University. In 1995, he founded U.S. Translation Company.

Through his direction, USTC has grown tremendously in its 30 years of business. He has guided his company to achieve ISO 9001:2008 and EN 15038 certification, and has received many awards including Utah's Best of State for Language Services in 2009-2013 and 2016; Inc. 500/5000 in 2010-2012 & 2014–2016 for fastest growing companies in America; Mountain West Capital Network's top 100 fastest growing companies in Utah for 2010, 2011 & 2013; the 2009 Top Forty Business Executives Under 40 in Utah; and the 2008 Small Business Person of the Year by the SBA. In 2014 he received the Weber State University Distinguished Alumnus Award, the 2015, the Utah Valley University Atlas Award, and the 2016 Quixote Award by the Utah Hispanic Chamber of Commerce. In spite of these accolades, USTC consistently receives negative reviews from employees as a place to work, many of them citing Utrilla's micromanaging tendencies.

David also serves on the Board of trustees of the Utah Symphony and Opera, is on the board of the World Trade Association of Utah, is the upcoming President of the Utah Consular Corps, is on the Weber State University President's National Advisory Council, is the chair of the advisory board for the School of Business and Economics at WSU, is advisory council member of the Master of International Affairs and Global Enterprise program at the University of Utah, is vice-chair of the Utah Council for Citizen and Diplomacy, is an Advisory Committee Member of the U.S. Global Leadership Coalition, and is the Chair of the Global Community Advisory Board at Utah Valley University. In 2009, he was appointed by the President of Peru as the Honorary Consul of Peru in Utah and he currently holds this position.

== Personal life ==
Utrilla resides in North Salt Lake, Utah with his wife Krista and four children.
