= Jorge Benitez (American soccer) =

Peruvian-born American soccer player

Personal information
- Place of birth: Peru
- Position: Forward

Senior career*
Years	Team	Apps	(Gls)
1965–1967	Ukrainian Nationals	?	(37)
1967–1968	Boston Tigers	?	(7)
1968	Los Angeles Wolves	11	(6)
1969	Kansas City Spurs	14	(15)

International career
1972	United States	2	(0)
- * Club domestic league appearances and goals

Jorge Benítez, also known as George Benitez, is an American former soccer forward. He played in both the American Soccer League and the North American Soccer League. He also earned two caps with the U.S. national team in 1972.

== Professional career ==
Benitez played at least two seasons in the American Soccer League. He was second in league scoring with 21 goals while with the Ukrainian Nationals during the 1965–1966 season. In the 1966–1967 season, he led the league in scoring with 16 goals. He then scored seven goals with the Boston Tigers during the 1967-1968 ASL season before jumping to the Los Angeles Wolves of the North American Soccer League. The Wolves folded at the end of the season and Benitez moved to the Kansas City Spurs for the 1969 season. He was the second leading scorer with fifteen goals in fourteen games as the Spurs won the league championship.

== National team ==
Benitez earned two caps with the U.S. national team. Both came in World Cup qualification losses to Mexico in 1972. The first was a 3–1 loss on September 3 and the second was a 2–1 loss a week later.
