= Miss United Kingdom =

Beauty pageant

- Formation: 1958; 68 years ago
- Headquarters: London
- Location: United Kingdom
- Official language: English
- President: Julia Morley
- Affiliations: Miss International; Miss Supranational

Miss United Kingdom is a title held by the highest-ranked contestant from the UK at Miss World. The winner sometimes competes at Miss International and Miss Supranational the following year under the Britain, England or United Kingdom banner. From 1958 to 1999, Miss United Kingdom was a national beauty pageant held to choose a representative for the Miss World Pageant. In 1999, Scotland and Wales had their own contestants at Miss World, and in 2000, England and Northern Ireland sent their own representatives. The existing organization now runs the Miss England competition.

== History ==
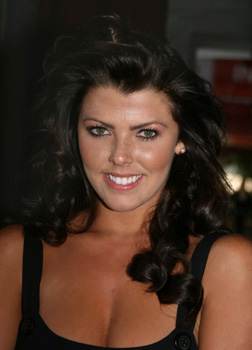
Nieve Jennings, Miss UK 2007

The pageant was created in 1958 by Eric Morley, the man behind the Miss World pageant. Before 1958, the winner of the Miss Great Britain contest would go on to represent the UK at the Miss World pageant, but from 1952 to 1957, none of the Miss GB title holders made the final seven at Miss World, so Morley decided to create the Miss United Kingdom contest in the hope of achieving better results at Miss World. From 1958 to 1999, the winner of Miss United Kingdom title would represent the UK at Miss World.

At Miss United Kingdom, traditionally there would be regional heats from the four constituent Countries of the United Kingdom, these would take place early in the year. The winners of the respective Miss England, Miss Scotland and Miss Wales titles would compete in the summer at Miss Universe. The Miss UK contest would then take place featuring these titleholders plus a certain number of other top contestants from the regions, the winner would then go on to compete at the Miss World Contest in October/November. This meant that during the 60s, 70s and 80s, many British beauty queens competed at both the Miss Universe and Miss World contests.

Although England, Scotland, Wales and Northern Ireland have had separate representatives in other international pageants, Miss World did not allow this until the creation of separate Parliaments in the United Kingdom.

1999 was the year of the last Miss United Kingdom pageant, won by Nicola Willoughby, who competed as Miss UK at Miss World (the final woman to do so). The 1999 Miss World contest also saw the debuts of Scotland (represented by Stephanie Norrie) and Wales (represented by Clare Marie Daniels), so there was the unusual situation of having a Miss UK compete alongside Miss Scotland and Miss Wales. The following year, Julie Lee-Ann Martin became the first representative of Northern Ireland in the pageant while Michelle Walker was the first to compete as Miss England.

Since 2000, the Miss World Organization has announced the highest-ranking delegate of the four home nations at Miss World, as the winner of the Miss United Kingdom title. The winner receives a cash prize and has often represented the United Kingdom at the Miss International contest the following year. Since 2000, Scotland has the most Miss United Kingdom winners with (9), followed by England (6), then Wales (4), and ending with Northern Ireland (3).

== Winners ==
=== From 2000 to present ===
Year	Miss United Kingdom	Country	Miss World Placement	1st Runner-Up	Country	Miss World Placement	2nd Runner-Up	Country	Miss World Placement
2025	Millie-Mae Adams	Wales	Top 20	Hannah Johns	Northern Ireland	Top 40	—	—	—
2024	No contest due to the delay of the 2023 pageant.								
2023 / 2024	Jessica Gagen	England	Top 8	Darcey Corria	Wales	Top 40	—	—	—
2022	No contest due to the delay of the 2021 pageant.								
2021 / 2022	Anna Leitch	Northern Ireland	Top 6 (4th)	Rehema Muthamia	England	Top 40	—	—	—
2020	No contest due to the COVID-19 pandemic.								
2019 / 2020	Bhasha Mukherjee	England	Top 40	—	—	—	—	—	—
2018	Linzi McLelland	Scotland	Top 12	—	—	—	—	—	—
2017	Stephanie Hill	England	2nd Runner-Up	—	—	—	—	—	—
2016	Not elected by Miss World Organisation								
2015	Mhairi Fergusson	Scotland	Top 20 (18th)	Leanne McDowell	Northern Ireland	Top 20 (20th)	—	—	—
2014	Carina Tyrrell	England	Top 5 (4th)	Ellie McKeating	Scotland	Top 25	—	—	—
2013	Kirsty Heslewood	England	Top 10 (6th)	—	—	—	—	—	—
2012	Sophie Moulds	Wales	1st Runner-Up	Charlotte Holmes	England	Top 15 (8th)	Tiffany Brien	Northern Ireland	Top 30
2011	Alize Lily Mounter	England	Top 7 (4th)	Jennifer Reoch	Scotland	Top 7 (7th)	Finola Guinnane	Northern Ireland	Non-Finalist (32nd)
2010	Nicola Mimnagh	Scotland	Top 25	Lori Moore	Northern Ireland	Top 25	—	—	—
2009	Katharine Brown	Scotland	Non-Finalist	—	—	—	—	—	—
2008	Chloe-Beth Morgan	Wales	Non-Finalist	—	—	—	—	—	—
2007	Nieve Jennings	Scotland	Non-Finalist (17th)	—	—	—	—	—	—
2006	Nicola McLean	Scotland	Top 17 (10th)	Catherine Jean Milligan	Northern Ireland	Top 17	—	—	—
2005	Lucy Evangelista	Northern Ireland	Top 15	—	—	—	—	—	—
2004	Amy Guy	Wales	Top 15	—	—	—	—	—	—
2003	Nicci Jolly	Scotland	Non-Finalist	—	—	—	—	—	—
2002	Gayle Williamson	Northern Ireland	Non-Finalist	—	—	—	—	—	—
2001	Juliet-Jane Horne	Scotland	2nd Runner-Up	—	—	—	—	—	—
2000	Michelle Watson	Scotland	Non-Finalist	—	—	—	—	—	—

=== From 1958 to 1999 ===
Year	Miss United Kingdom	Age	Represented	Miss World Placement	1st Runner-Up	Represented	2nd Runner-Up	Represented
1999	Nicola Willoughby		Lincoln, England	Non-Finalist (15th)	Julia Keegan	Bristol	Emma Keenan	Manchester
1998	Emmalene McLoughlin		Manchester, England	Non-Finalist	Joanne Salley	Larne, Northern Ireland	Katie Viggers	Birmingham
1997	Vicki-Lee Walberg		Blackpool, England	Top 10	Abby Essien	Lancaster	Sarah Smart	Leicestershire
1996	Rachael Liza Warner		Portmeirion, Wales	Non-Finalist (11th)	Kathy Green	Sheffield	Alice Wogan	Rothbury
1995	Shauna Marie Gunn		County Fermanagh, Northern Ireland	Non-Finalist	Angie Bowness	Sheffield	Michelle Gascoigne	Bradford
1994	Melanie Abdoun		London, England	Top 10	Emma Steadman	Blackpool	Josie Saltwood	Belfast, Northern Ireland
1993	Amanda Louise Johnson	19	Nottingham, England	Non-Finalist	Rosie Ann James	Glasgow, Scotland	Caitlyn Vorschynn	Liverpool
1992	Claire Elizabeth Smith	22	Chester, England	1st Runner-Up	Melanie Sykes	Ashton-under-Lyne, Lancashire	Sally Brake	Rotherham, South Yorkshire
1991	Johanne Elizabeth Lewis		Mansfield, England	Non-Finalist (Joint 11th)	Liz Carter	Doncaster, South Yorkshire	Cherie Grainger	Bristol
1990	Helen Upton	19	Blackpool, England	Non-Finalist (Joint 11th)	Kathy Furniss	Basildon, Essex	Sandra Pack	Wales
1989	Suzanne Younger		Portmeirion, Wales	Top 10	Racquel Jory	Blackburn, England	Victoria Lace	Dundee, Scotland
1988	Kirsty Roper	18	Manchester, England	2nd Runner-Up	Angela Newlands	Wolverhampton	Nicola Kidd	Peterborough
1987	Karen Mellor	25	Derby, England	Non-Finalist (Joint 10th)	Heather Daniels	Portsmouth	Helen Fairbrother	Swindon
1986	Alison Slack		Sheffield, England	Top 15	Joanne Sedgley	England	Suzanne Younger	Mold
1985	Mandy Adele Shires	19	Bradford, England	1st Runner-Up	Joanne Sedgley	Newquay	Barbara Christian	Wales
1984	Vivienne Rooke	22	Weston-super-Mare, England	3rd Runner-Up	Lea La Salle	Wrexham	Susan Tan	Northern Ireland
1983	Sarah-Jane Hutt	18	Poole, England	Miss World 1983	Karen Lesley Moore	England	Nicola Stanley	Isle of Wight
1982	Della Frances Dolan	20	Grimsby, England	2nd Runner-Up	Alison Smith	Belfast	Ann Jackson	Chichester
1981	Michele Donnelly	20	Cardiff, Wales	4th Runner-Up	Della Frances Dolan	Yorkshire	Georgina Kearney	Scotland
1980	Kim Ashfield	21	Buckley, Wales	4th Runner-Up	Nicky Wright	Poole	Julie Duckworth	England
1979	Carolyn Seaward	18	Yelverton, England	1st Runner-Up	Lorraine Davidson	Scotland	Karen Loughlin	Stockport
1978	Elizabeth Ann Jones	20	Welshpool, Wales	5th Runner-Up	Janet Withey	London	Beverley Isherwood	England
1977	Madeleine Stringer	24	North Shields, England	5th Runner-Up	Dorothy Walker	Edinburgh	Sarah Long	England
1976	Carol Jean Grant^{[**]}	19	Glasgow, Scotland	3rd Runner-Up	Sian Adey-Jones	Wales	Joanna Booth	Sheffield
1975	Vicki Harris	22	London, England	2nd Runner-Up	Sue Cuff	Manchester	Gail Inglis	Dundee
1974	Helen Morgan	21	Barry, Wales	Miss World 1974 (Resigned)	Kathy Anders	England	Linda Myers	Sale
1973	Veronica Ann Cross	23	London, England	6th Runner-Up	Marie Kirkwood	—	Pam Wood	—
1972	Jennifer McAdam	24	London, England	6th Runner-Up	Elaine Farnworth	Ramsbottom	Julie Marcus	—
1971	Marilyn Ward	21	New Milton, England	1st Runner-Up	Linda Ann Thomas	Blackpool	Anita Gudgeon	Basildon
1970	Yvonne Ormes	20	Nantwich, England	6th Runner-Up	Jean Galston	Manchester	Lee Hamilton Marshall	Scotland
1969	Sheena Drummond	18	Tullibody, Scotland	Top 15	—	—	—	—
1968	Kathleen Winstanley	23	Wigan, England	1st Runner-Up	Marie Smith	Glasgow	Lisa Robertshaw	Bradford South
1967	Jennifer Lynn Lewis	20	Leicester, England	4th Runner-Up	Jennifer Gurley	Manchester	Nine Scott	Sheffield
1966	Jennifer Lowe Summers	20	Warrington, England	Top 15	—	—	—	—
1965	Lesley Langley	20	London, England	Miss World 1965	—	—	—	—
1964	Ann Sidney	20	Poole, England	Miss World 1964	—	—	—	—
1963	Diane Westbury^{[*]}	19	Ilkeston, England	5th Runner-Up	—	—	—	—
1962	Jackie White	20	Alvaston, England	Top 15	—	—	—	—
1961	Rosemarie Frankland†	18	Rhos, Wales	Miss World 1961	—	—	—	—
1960	Hilda Fairclough	23	Lancaster, England	Top 10	—	—	—	—
1959	Anne Thelwell	22	Heswall, England	3rd Runner-Up	—	—	—	—
1958	Eileen Sheridan†	22	Walton-on-Thames, England	5th Runner-Up	—	—	—	—

^{*} Real name Diane Hickingbotham
^{**} Also known as Carolyn Grant
^{†} Dead

== United Kingdom in international pageants ==
=== Miss World ===
From 1952 to 1957 the UK were represented by the winner of the Miss Great Britain pageant. At the first Miss World in 1951, 21 of the 26 contestants were from the UK, including those that placed as first runner-up and second runner-up. From 1958 to 1999 the winner of the Miss United Kingdom pageant competed. There have been five UK winners of the Miss World title; all won the title competing as Miss United Kingdom.

Year	Titleholder	Country (Banner Title)	Placement
1957	Leila Williams	Great Britain	
1956	Iris Alice Kathleen Waller	Great Britain	
1955	Jennifer Chimes	Great Britain	
1954	Patricia Butler	Great Britain	
1953	Brenda Mee	Great Britain	
1952	Marlene Ann Dee	Britain 1951	
1952	Doreen Dawne	Britain	
1951	Laura Ellison-Davies	Britain	1st Runner-up
1951	Doreen Dawne	Britain	2nd Runner-up
1951	Aileen P. Chase	Britain	4th Runner-up
1951	Pat Cameron	Britain	
1951	Fay Cotton	Britain	
1951	Marlene Ann Dee	Britain	
1951	Thelma Kerr	Britain	
1951	Norma Kitchen	Britain	
1951	Mary McLaney	Britain	
1951	Brenda Mee	Britain	
1951	Margaret Mills	Britain	
1951	Margaret Morgan	Britain	
1951	Maureen O'Neill	Britain	
1951	Elaine Pryce	Britain	
1951	Jean Sweeney	Britain	
1951	Margaret Turner	Britain	
1951	Nina Way	Britain	
1951	Sidney Walker	Britain	
1951	Ann Rosemary West	Britain	
1951	Jean Worthe	Britain	
1951	Sylvia Wren	Britain	

=== Miss Universe ===
The first UK contestant was Aileen Chase, who competed at the first Miss Universe in 1952 as Miss Great Britain. From 1955 to 1990 Miss England would compete, joined (from 1961 to 1990) By Miss Scotland and Miss Wales; many of these contestants would go on to compete at (and win) the Miss United Kingdom contest later in the year. The Miss World organisation held the franchise. The 1990s and 21st century have returned to one contestant competing as Miss United Kingdom or Miss Great Britain. Since 2005 the UK has been represented by the winner of the Miss Universe Great Britain pageant. No woman from the United Kingdom has ever won Miss Universe.

Year	Titleholder	Country (Banner Title)	Placement	Special Award
2025	Danielle Latimer	Great Britain		
2024	Christina Chalk	Great Britain		
2023	Jessica Page	Great Britain		
2022	Noky Simbani	Great Britain		
2021	Emma Rose Collingridge	Great Britain	Top 16	
2020	Jeanette Akua	Great Britain	Top 21	
2019	Emma Jenkins	Great Britain		
2018	Dee-Ann Kentish-Rogers	Great Britain	Top 20	
2017	Anna Burdzy	Great Britain	Top 16	
2016	Jaime-Lee Faulkner	Great Britain		
2015	Narissara France	Great Britain		
2014	Grace Levy	Great Britain		
2013	Amy Willerton	Great Britain	Top 10	
2012	Holly Hale	Great Britain		
2011	Chloe-Beth Morgan	Great Britain		
2010	Tara Hoyos-Martínez	Great Britain		
2009	Clair Cooper	Great Britain		
2008	Lisa Lazarus	UK		
2006	Julie Doherty	United Kingdom		
2005	Brooke Johnston	United Kingdom		
2000	Louise Lakin	Great Britain		
1999	Cherie Pisani	Great Britain		
1998	Leilani Anne Dowding	Great Britain		
1996	Anita St. Rose	Great Britain		
1995	Sarah-Jane Southwick	Great Britain		
1994	Michaela Pyke	Great Britain		
1993	Kathryn Middleton	Great Britain		
1992	Tiffany Stanford	Great Britain		
1991	Helen Upton	United Kingdom		
1990	Carla Barrow	England		
1990	Karina Ferguson	Scotland		
1990	Jane Lloyd	Wales		
1989	Raquel Marie Jory	England		
1989	Victoria Susannah Lace	Scotland		
1989	Andrea Caroline Jones	Wales		
1988	Tracey Williams	England		Miss Photogenic
1988	Amanda Laird	Scotland		
1988	Lise Marie Williams	Wales		
1987	Yvette Dawn Lindsey	England		
1987	Nicola Gail Davies	Wales		
1986	Joanne Ruth Sedgley	England		
1986	Natalie M. Devlin	Scotland		
1986	Tracey Rowlands	Wales		
1985	Helen Westlake	England		
1985	Jacqueline Hendrie	Scotland		
1985	Barbara Christian	Wales		
1984	Louise Gray	England		
1984	May Monaghan	Scotland		
1984	Jane Anne Riley	Wales		
1983	Karen Lesley Moore	England	4th Runner-up	
1983	Linda Renton	Scotland		
1983	Lianne Gray	Wales		
1982	Della Frances Dolan	England	Top 12	
1982	Georgina Kearney	Scotland		
1982	Michelle Donelly	Wales		
1981	Joanna Longley	England		
1981	Anne McFarlane	Scotland		
1981	Karen Ruth Stannard	Wales		
1980	Julie Duckworth	England		
1980	Linda Gallagher	Scotland	1st Runner-up	
1980	Kim Ashfield	Wales		
1979	Carolyn Ann Seaward	England	2nd Runner-up	Miss Photogenic
1979	Lorraine Davidson	Scotland	Top 12	
1979	Janet Beverly Hobson	Wales	Top 12	
1978	Beverly Isherwood	England		
1978	Angela Mary Kate McLeod	Scotland		
1978	Elizabeth Ann Jones	Wales		
1977	Sarah Louise Long	England		
1977	Sandra Bell	Scotland	2nd Runner-up	
1977	Christine Anne Murphy	Wales		
1976	Pauline Davis	England	Top 12	Miss Photogenic
1976	Carol Grant	Scotland	3rd Runner-up	
1976	Sian Adey-Jones	Wales	2nd Runner-up	
1975	Vicki Harris	England	Top 12	
1975	Mary Kirkwood	Scotland		
1975	Georgina Kerler	Wales		
1974	Kathleen Ann Anders	England	Top 12	
1974	Catherine Robertson	Scotland		
1974	Helen Elizabeth Morgan	Wales	1st Runner-up	
1973	Veronica Ann Cross	England		
1973	Caroline Meade	Scotland		
1973	Deirdre Jennifer Greenland	Wales		
1972	Jennifer McAdam	England	4th Runner-up	
1972	Elizabeth Joan Stevely	Scotland		
1972	Eileen Darroch	Wales		
1971	Marilyn Ann Ward	England	Top 12	
1971	Elizabeth Montgomery	Scotland		
1971	Dawn Cater	Wales		
1970	Yvonne Anne Ormes	England		
1970	Lee Hamilton Marshall	Scotland		
1970	Sandra Cater	Wales		
1969	Myra Van Heck	England		
1969	Sheena Drumond	Scotland		
1969	Shirley Jones	Wales		
1968	Jennifer Lowe Summers	England		
1968	Helen Davidson	Scotland		
1968	Judith Radford	Wales		
1967	Jennifer Lewis	England	2nd Runner-up	
1967	Lena MacGarvie	Scotland		
1967	Denise Elizabeth Pag	Wales	Top 15	
1966	Janice Whiteman	England	Top 15	
1966	Linda Ann Lees	Scotland		
1966	Christine Heller	Wales		
1965	Jennifer Warren Gurley	England		
1965	Mary Young	Scotland		
1965	Joan Boull	Wales		
1964	Brenda Blackler	England	1st Runner-up	
1964	Wendy Barrie	Scotland		
1964	Marilyn Joy Samuel	Wales		
1963	Wendy Barrie	Scotland		Miss Congeniality
1963	Maureen Thomas	Wales		
1962	Kim Carlton	England	Top 12	Miss Photogenic; Best National Costume
1962	Vera Parker	Scotland		
1962	Hazel Williams	Wales		
1961	Arlette Dobson	England	3rd Runner-up	
1961	Susan Jones	Scotland	Top 15	
1961	Rosemarie Frankland	Wales	1st Runner-up	
1960	Joan Ellinor Boardman	England	Top 15	
1959	Pamela Anne Searle	England	3rd Runner-up	Miss Photogenic
1958	Dorothy Hazeldine	England		
1957	Sonia Hamilton	England	2nd Runner-up	
1956	Iris Alice Kathleen Waller	England	3rd Runner-up	
1955	Margaret Rowe	England	Top 15	Most Popular Girl in Parade
1952	Aileen P. Chase	Great Britain		

=== Miss International ===
Year	Titleholder	Country	Placement	Special Award
2026	Brittany Feeney	United Kingdom	TBA	
2025	Sophie Wallace	United Kingdom		Miss International Europe
2024	Tiny Simbani	United Kingdom		
2023	Alisha Cowie	United Kingdom		Miss International Europe
2022	Evanjelin Elchmanar	United Kingdom	Top 15	Best in Swimsuit
2021	Due to the impact of COVID-19 pandemic, no pageant in 2021			
2020	Due to the impact of COVID-19 pandemic, no pageant in 2020			
2019	Harriotte Lane	United Kingdom	4th Runner-Up	
2018	Sharon Gaffka	United Kingdom		
2017	Ashley Powell	United Kingdom	Top 8	Miss International Europe
2016	Romy Simpkins	United Kingdom		
2015	Sophie Loudon	United Kingdom	Top 10	
2014	Victoria Tooby	United Kingdom	3rd runner-up	
2013	Elizabeth Greenham	United Kingdom		
2012	Alize Lily Mounter	United Kingdom	Top 15	
2010	Katharine Brown	United Kingdom		
2009	Chloe-Beth Morgan	United Kingdom	2nd runner-up	
2008	Nieve Jennings	United Kingdom		
2007	Samantha Freedman	United Kingdom		
2005	Amy Guy	United Kingdom		
2004	Laura Shields	United Kingdom	Top 15	
2003	Gayle Williamson	United Kingdom		
2002	Juliet-Jane Horne	United Kingdom		
2001	Michelle Watson	Britain		
1999	Janeth Kehinde Ayuba	Britain		
1998	Melanie Devina Jones	Britain		
1997	Rachael Liza Warner	Britain		
1996	Shauna Marie Gunn	Britain		
1995	Melanie Abdoun	Britain		
1994	Amanda Louise Johnson	Britain	Top 15	
1993	Claire Elizabeth Smith	Britain		
1992	Joanne Elizabeth Lewis	Britain		
1991	Helen Upton	Britain	Top 15	
1990	Jane Lloyd	Britain		
1989	Victoria Susannah Lace	Britain	Top 15	
1988	Heather Jane Daniels	Britain		
1987	Debbie Ann Pearman	Britain		
1986	Helen Fairbrother	England	Winner	
1986	Kim Robertson	Scotland		
1986	Judith Kay Popham	Wales		
1985	Andrea Vivienne Boardman	England	Top 15	
1985	Karen Helen Bell	Scotland		
1985	Samantha Amystone	Wales		
1984	Karen Lesley Moore	England	Top 15	
1984	Siobhan Fowl	Scotland		
1984	Jane Ann Riley	Wales		
1983	Nicola Stanley	England	Top 15	Miss Photogenic
1983	Alison Dunn	Scotland	Top 15	
1983	Lianne Patricia Gray	Wales		
1982	Anne Marie Jackson	England	Top 15	
1982	Lena Masterton	Scotland		
1982	Caroline Jane Williams	Wales	Top 15	
1981	Susan Elizabeth Hutt	England		
1981	Margaret Bisset	Scotland	Top 15	
1981	Sally Douglas Williams	Wales		
1980	Lorraine Davidson	Britain		
1979	Beverly Isherwood	Britain		
1978	Patricia Morgan	Britain		
1977	Sian Helen Adey-Jones	Britain		
1976	Janet Withey	Britain	Top 15	
1975	Sharon Jermyn	Britain		
1974	Joanna Booth	Britain	1st runner-up	
1973	Zoe Spink	Britain	1st runner-up	
1972	Linda Hooks	Britain	Winner	
1971	Pamela Wood	Britain	Top 15	Miss Photogenic
1970	Jacqueline "Jackie" Francesca Molloy	Britain		
1969	Valerie Holmes	Britain	Winner	
1968	Gloria Best	England		
1968	Marie Smith	Scotland	Top 15	
1968	Kay House	Wales		
1967	Sonia Gail Ross	England	Top 15	
1967	Marlene McFadyn	Scotland		
1967	Dawn Sullivan	Wales		
1965	Carol Crompton	England	Top 15	Miss Photogenic
1965	Anne Snape Smith	Scotland		
1965	Susan Strangemore	Wales		
1964	Tracy Ingram	England	3rd runner-up	
1964	Dorothy Smallman	Scotland		
1964	Pamela Martin	Wales		
1963	Diane Westbury	England	1st runner-up	
1963	Wendy Barrie	Scotland		
1963	Christina Fryer	Wales		
1962	Sue Burgess	England		
1962	Elizabeth Burns	Scotland		
1962	Diane Thomas	Wales		
1961	Nicky Allen	England		
1961	Annie Carnie Jinks	Scotland		
1961	Barbara Wilcock	Wales		
1960	Joyce Kay	England	3rd runner-up	

=== Miss Supranational ===
Year	Titleholder	Country	Placement	Special Award
2026	Niamh Taylor	United Kingdom		
2025	Brittany Feeney	United Kingdom	Top 12	
2024	Joanna Johnson	United Kingdom	Top 25	
2023	Emma Rose Collingridge	United Kingdom	3rd runner-up	
2022	Kate Marie	England		
2021	Sophie Marie Dunning	England		
2020	Due to the impact of COVID-19 pandemic, no pageant in 2020			
2019	Kirsty Lerchundi	England		
2018	Romy Simpkins	England		
2017	Did not compete			
2016	Angelina Kaliszewicz	England		
2015	Emily Coral Alice Hill	England		
2014	Zandra Flores	England		Miss Elegance
2013	Rachel Sophia Adina Christie	England		
2012	Rachael Howard	England	Top 20	
2011	Hannah Owens	England		
2010	Claire Louise Catterall	England		
2009	Amanda Lillian Ball	England		

=== Miss Europe ===
The UK started sending representatives to the Miss Europe contest in 1929. From 1929-1936, the winner of Miss England competed at Miss Europe. The UK did not send any representatives in 1937 but returned in 1938, it is unknown how the representative was determined in 1938. In 1933, a representative from Scotland was also sent. The Miss Europe contest stopped after 1938 due to World War II but returned after the war in 1948. In 1948 & 1949, the winner of Miss Great Britain competed at Miss Europe. The UK did not compete in 1950 and there was no contest in 1951. In 1952, both the contest and the UK returned. It is unknown how that year's representative was chosen. From 1953 to 1969, Miss England sent delegates to compete at Miss Europe and that was the only UK representative at the pageant. Starting in 1970, the UK's representation was from Miss England, Miss Scotland & Miss Wales, this lasted until 1997. Starting in 1999, there was only one UK representative and they competed as Great Britain (with the exception of 2003 & 2005, 2003 competed as United Kingdom and 2005 competed as England).

Year	Titleholder	Country (Banner Title)	Placement	Special Award
2006	Eleanor Mary Ann Glynn	Great Britain		
2005	Laura Shields	England		
2003	Samantha Vaughan	United Kingdom	Top 12	
2002	Yana Booth	Great Britain	Top 10	
1999	Danielle Waller	Great Britain		
1997	Emma Scott	England		
1997	Kate Ann Peyton	Wales		
1996	Marie-Claire Harrison	England	Winner	
1996	Zara Baynes	Wales		
1995	Angie Bowness	England	Top 12	
1995	Tracy West	Scotland		
1995	Liza Warner	Wales		
1994	Amanda Louise Johnson	England	3rd runner-up	
1994	Sarah MacRae	Scotland		
1993	Alison Hobson	England	Top 12	Miss Friendship
1993	Laura King	Scotland		
1993	Natalie Lee	Wales		
1992	Joanne Elizabeth Lewis	England		
1992	Katrina Lyall	Scotland		
1992	Sharon Isherwood	Wales		
1991	Racquel Jory	England		
1991	Karina Ferguson	Scotland		
1991	Jane Lloyd	Wales		
1988	Eileen Ann Catterson	Scotland		
1988	Nicola Gail Davies	Wales		
1984	Karen Lesley Moore	England	Top 10	
1984	Linda Renton	Scotland		
1984	Lianne Patricia Gray	Wales		
1982	Jane Karen Davidson	England		
1982	Lena Masterton	Scotland		
1982	Caroline Jane Williams	Wales	3rd runner-up	
1981	Joanna Longley	England		
1981	Anne McFarlane	Scotland		
1981	Karen Ruth Stannard	Wales		
1980	Tracey Jessop	England		
1980	Lorraine Davidson	Scotland		
1980	Janet Beverly Hobson	Wales		
1978	Sarah Louise Long	England	2nd runner-up	
1976	Pauline Davies	England		
1976	Mary Kirkwood	Scotland	4th runner-up	Miss Elegance; Miss Photogenic
1976	Sian Helen Adey-Jones	Wales		
1974	Kathleen Ann Celeste Anders	England	4th runner-up	
1973	Zoe Spink	England	Top 7	Miss Elegance
1972	Jennifer McAdam	England	4th runner-up	
1972	Elizabeth Joan Stevely	Scotland		
1972	Eileen Darroch	Wales		
1971	Pamela Wood	England		
1970	Jacqueline "Jackie" Francesca Molloy	England		
1970	Lee Hamilton Marshall	Scotland		
1970	Sandra Cater	Wales		
1969	Marie Smith	England		
1968	Jennifer Lowe Summers	England		
1967	Jennifer Lynn Lewis	England		
1966	Janice Carol Whiteman	England		
1965	Jennifer Warren Gurley	England		
1964	Brenda Blackler	England		
1963	Susan Pratt	England		
1962	Kim Carlton	England		
1961	Arlette Dobson	England		
1960	Joan Ellinor Boardman	England		
1959	Karen MacGill	England		
1958	Dorothy Hazeldine	England		
1957	Sonia Hamilton	England	4th runner-up	
1956	Ilena Nelson	England		
1955	Margaret Rowe	England	4th runner-up	
1954	June Peters	England		
1953	Marlene Ann Dee	England	1st runner-up	
1952	Judy Breen	England		
1949	Elaine Pryce	Great Britain		
1949	June Mitchell	Dominions (Great Britain)		
1948	Pamela Bayliss	Great Britain		
1938	Doris Williams	England		
1936	Laurence Atkins	England		
1935	Muriel Oxford	Great Britain		
1934	June Lammas	England	1st runner-up	
1933	Angela Ward	England		
1933	Avia Talbot	Scotland		
1932	Gwen Stallard	England		
1931	Betty Mason	England		
1930	Marjorie Ross	England		
1929	Benny Dicks	England		

=== International Pageant of Pulchritude ===
In 1928 and 1929, the winner of Miss England competed at the International Pageant of Pulchritude.

Year	Titleholder	Country (Banner Title)	Placement	Special Award
1929	Benny Dicks	England		
1928	Nonni Shields	England		

== Hosts ==
Year	Hosts
1966	Simon Dee and Mike Neville
1967	David Symonds and Mike Neville
1968	Michael Aspel and Dick Norton
1969-1970	Michael Aspel and Keith Fordyce
1971	Michael Aspel and David Vine
1972-1973	David Vine and Terry Wogan
1974-1975	David Vine and Ray Moore
1976-1977	John Stapleton and Ray Moore
1978	Terry Wogan, Ray Moore and Esther Rantzen
1979	Paul Burnett, Ray Moore and Jan Leeming
1980	Peter Marshall and Judith Chalmers
1997	Tania Bryer, Russ Williams

== See also ==
- Miss England
- Miss Northern Ireland
- Miss Scotland
- Miss Wales
- Miss Great Britain
- Miss Universe Great Britain
