= Miss Universe Great Britain =

National beauty pageant competition in Great Britain

- Formation: 1952; 74 years ago
- Purpose: Beauty pageant
- Headquarters: Cardiff
- Location: Wales
- Official language: English
- Director: Paula Abbandonato
- Current titleholder: Angela Aumonier, England
- Affiliations: Miss Universe
- Website: missuniversegb.co.uk

Miss Universe Great Britain is a national beauty pageant that selects the British representative in the Miss Universe contest.

== History ==
When created as Miss Universe Great Britain in 1952, 30 women from Great Britain and Northern Ireland competed. Aileen Chase would be the only contestant to compete at Miss Universe as Miss Great Britain or Miss UK until the 1990s. For four decades there would be no Miss Great Britain nor Miss United Kingdom at Miss Universe.

There was no UK participant at Miss Universe in 1953–1954. From 1955 to 1990 (except 1956), the winner of Miss England competed in the Miss Universe contest. Miss Scotland and Miss Wales first competed in 1961 and again, competed every year until 1990, except 1987 in Scotland's case, as that year's Miss Scotland, Eileen Catterson, was disqualified for being under age.

At Miss Universe 1991, Helen Upton, the winner of the 1990 Miss United Kingdom pageant, became the first contestant since 1952 to compete at Miss Universe under the Miss GB or Miss UK banner. She competed as Miss United Kingdom.

At 1992, Tiffany Stanford, Miss British Isles 1992, was appointed to compete as Miss Great Britain.

From 1993 to 1999, the rights to the pageant went to Miss Great Britain pageant. After that, Miss Great Britain Universe returned in 2000. There was no British representative at Miss Universe from 2001 to 2004.

In 2005 it returned with the name Miss Universe United Kingdom and the pageant had 30 delegates representing subdivision of British Overseas, Crown Dependencies, England, Northern Ireland, Scotland, and Wales.

In 2008 the rights to the pageant were awarded to Welsh Modelling agency Vibe Models, and the name was changed again to Miss Universe UK. The contest was revitalized, with a show being held in Central London to determine the winner; 38 contestants competed for the title.

In 2009 the name of the pageant was changed to the current name, Miss Universe Great Britain. The event was held at the Birmingham ICC.

In 2010, Miss Universe Great Britain took on new sponsors Front Agency in London.

In 2018, Dee-Ann Kentish-Rogers from Anguilla, a British Overseas Territory, won the contest. She is a past Commonwealth Games heptathlete and a barrister at law.

=== Gallery of winners ===
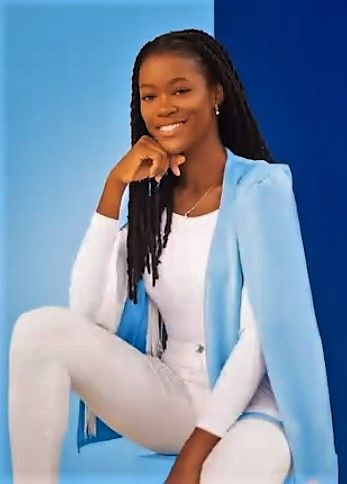
2018, Dee-Ann Kentish-Rogers

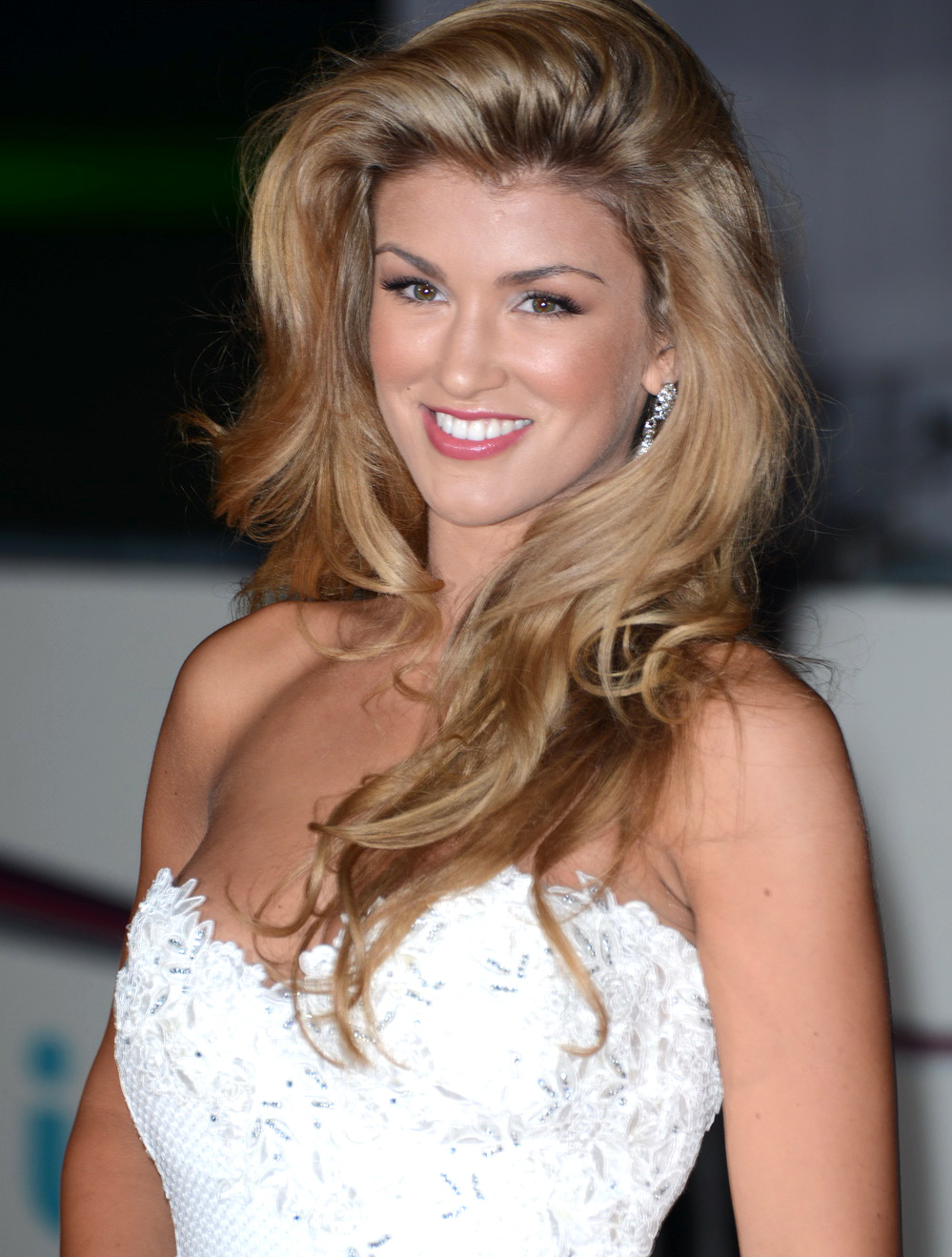
2013, Amy Willerton

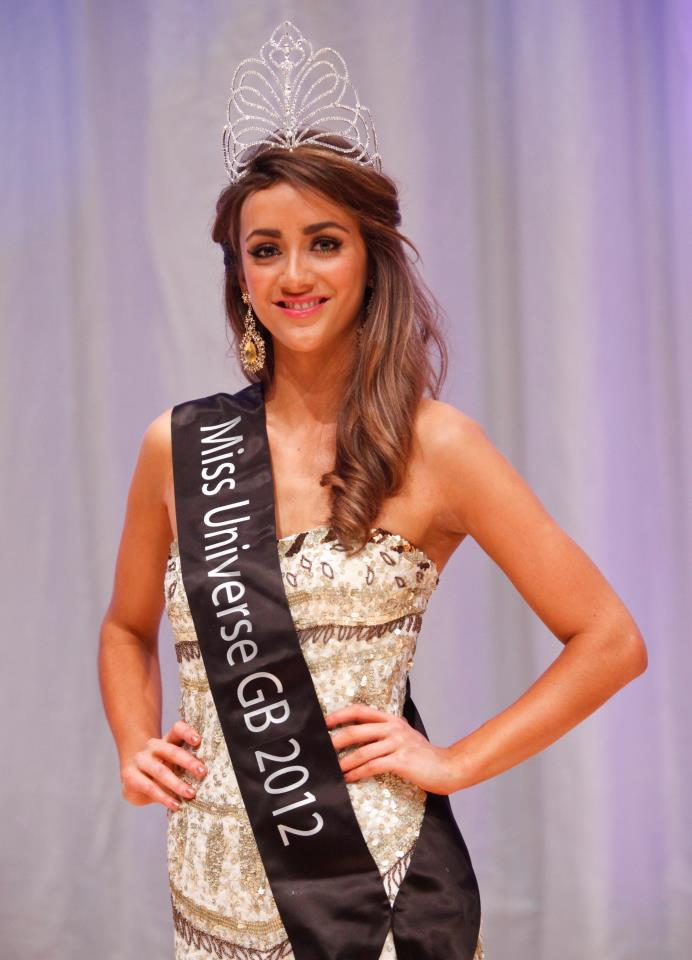
2012, Holly Hale

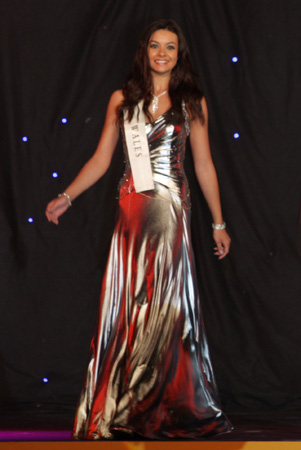
2011, Chloe-Beth Morgan

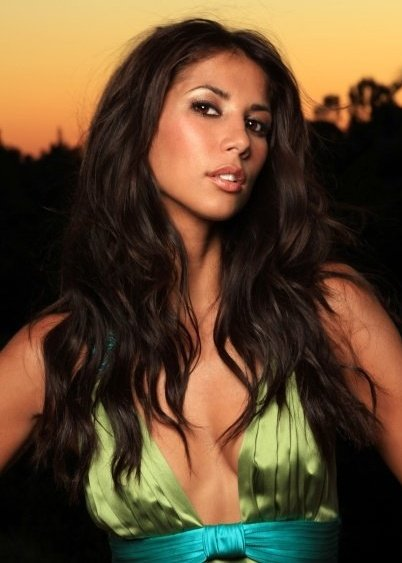
1998, Leilani Dowding

== Titleholders ==
The following is a list of winners of Miss Universe Great Britain, from 1952 to present.

Year	Miss Universe Great Britain	Country/Territory	Hometown
2026	Angela Aumonier	Isle of Man	Douglas (Note: Originally comes from the British Crown Dependency of Isle of Man; however Rogers represented London at the pageant as she had residency in London. This is due to the pageant's rule stating that all participants must have proof of residency in England, Scotland or Wales.)
2025	Danielle Latimer	Wales	Barry
2024	Christina Chalk	Scotland	Dunblane
2023	Jessica Page	England	Liverpool
2022	Noky Simbani	England	Derby
2021	Emma Collingridge	England	Suffolk
2020	Jeanette Akua	England	London
2019	Emma Jenkins	Wales	Llanelli
2018	Dee-Ann Kentish-Rogers	Anguilla	The Valley (Note: Originally comes from the British Overseas Territory of Anguilla; however Rogers represented Birmingham at the pageant as she had residency in Birmingham. This is due to the pageant's rule stating that all participants must have proof of residency in England, Scotland or Wales.)
2017	Anna Burdzy	England	Leicester
2016	Jaime-Lee Faulkner	England	Sheffield
2015	Narissara France	England	London
2014	Grace Levy	England	London
2013	Amy Willerton	England	London
2012	Holly Hale	Wales	Llanelli
2011	Chloe-Beth Morgan	Wales	Torfaen
2010	Tara Hoyos-Martínez	England	London
2009	Clair Cooper	England	London
2008	Lisa Lazarus	Wales	Llanelli
2006	Julie Doherty	England	Manchester
2005	Brooke Johnston	England	London
2000	Louise Lakin	England	Manchester
1999	Cherie Pisani	England	Essex
1998	Leilani Anne Dowding	England	Bournemouth
1996	Anita Saint Rose	England	London
1995	Sarah Jane Southwick	England	London
1994	Michaela Pyke	Wales	
1993	Kathryn Middleton	England	England
1992	Tiffany Stanford	England	England
1991	Helen Upton	England	England
1952	Aileen Chase	England	London

== Titleholders under Miss Universe Great Britain org. ==
=== Miss Universe Great Britain ===
- : Declared as Winner
- : Ended as runner-up or top 5/6 qualification
- : Ended as one of the finalists or semi-finalists
- : Ended as special awards winner

The winner of Miss Universe Great Britain represents the country at Miss Universe. On occasion, when the winner does not qualify (due to age) a runner-up is sent.

Year	Country	Hometown	Miss Universe GBR	Placement at Miss Universe	Special Award(s)
Paula Abbandonato directorship — a franchise holder to Miss Universe from 2008; Prior 2009, the name of pageant was Miss Universe UK competition and wore the UK sash at Miss Universe. Began 2009, Great Britain sash exists at Miss Universe pageant.
2026	England	Douglas	Angela Aumonier	TBA	
2025	Wales	Barry	Danielle Latimer	Unplaced	
2024	Scotland	Dunblane	Christina Chalk	Unplaced	
2023	England	Liverpool	Jessica Page	Unplaced	
2022	England	Derby	Noky Simbani	Unplaced	
2021	England	Suffolk	Emma Collingridge	Top 16	
2020	England	London	Jeanette Akua	Top 21	
2019	Wales	Llanelli	Emma Jenkins	Unplaced	
2018	Anguilla	The Valley	Dee-Ann Kentish-Rogers	Top 20	
2017	England	Leicester	Anna Burdzy	Top 16	
2016	England	Sheffield	Jaime-Lee Faulkner	Unplaced	
2015	England	London	Narissara France	Unplaced	
2014	England	London	Grace Levy	Unplaced	
2013	England	London	Amy Willerton	Top 10	
2012	Wales	Llanelli	Holly Hale	Unplaced	
2011	Wales	Torfaen	Chloe-Beth Morgan	Unplaced	
2010	England	London	Tara Hoyos-Martínez	Unplaced	
2009	England	London	Clair Cooper	Unplaced	
2008	Wales	Llanelli	Lisa Lazarus	Unplaced	
Welsh Modelling Agency Vibe Models "Miss United Kingdom Universe" directorship — a franchise holder to Miss Universe between 2006―2007
Did not compete in 2007
2006	England	London	Julie Doherty	Unplaced	
2005	England	London	Brooke Johnston	Unplaced	
Nicky Price "Miss Great Britain Universe" directorship — a franchise holder to Miss Universe in 2000
2000	England	Manchester	Louise Lakin	Unplaced	
The Singhs "Miss British Islaes (1991) & Miss Great Britain (1992―1998)" directorship — a franchise holder to Miss Universe in 1991―1998
1999	England	Clacton	Cherie Pisani	Unplaced	
1998	England	Bournemouth	Leilani Anne Dowding	Unplaced	
1997	Wales	Cardiff	Liz Fuller	Did not compete	
1996	England	London	Anita Saint Rose	Unplaced	
1995	England	Birmingham	Sarah Jane Southwick	Unplaced	
1994	Wales	Cardiff	Michaela Pyke	Unplaced	
1993	England	Chesterfield	Kathryn Middleton	Unplaced	
1992	England	Birmingham	Tiffany Stanford	Unplaced	
Eric Morley "Miss United Kingdom" directorship — a franchise holder to Miss Universe in 1991
1991	England	Birmingham	Helen Upton	Unplaced	
Eric Morley "Miss England, Miss Scotland, and Miss Wales" directorship — a franchise holder to Miss Universe between 1961―1990
1990	Wales	—	Jane Lloyd	Unplaced	
1990	Scotland	—	Karina Ferguson	Unplaced	
1990	England	London	Carla Barrow	Unplaced	
1989	Wales	—	Andrea Caroline Jones	Unplaced	
1989	Scotland	—	Victoria Susannah Lace	Unplaced	
1989	England	London	Racquel Jory	Unplaced	
1988	Wales	Clwyd	Lise Marie Williams	Unplaced	
1988	Scotland	Edinburgh	Amanda Laird	Unplaced	
1988	England	Nottinghamshire	Tracey Williams	Unplaced	
1987	Wales	Merthyr Tydfil	Nicola Gail Davies	Unplaced	
1987	Scotland	—	Julia Henderson	did not compete	
1987	England	Lancashire	Yvette Dawn Livesey	Unplaced	
1986	Wales	—	Tracey Rowlands	Unplaced	
1986	Scotland	Glasgow	Natalie Devlin	Unplaced	
1986	England	Newquay	Joanne Ruth Sedgley	Unplaced	
1985	Wales	Pontypridd	Barbara Christian	Unplaced	
1985	Scotland	Glasgow	Jackie Hendrie	Unplaced	
1985	England	London	Helen Westlake	Unplaced	
1984	Wales	Newport	Jane Ann Riley	Unplaced	
1984	Scotland	Glasgow	May Monaghan	Unplaced	
1984	England	Sheffield	Louise Gray	Unplaced	
1983	Wales	Cardiff	Lianne Patricia Gray	Unplaced	
1983	Scotland	Edinburgh	Linda Renton	Unplaced	
1983	England	Southsea	Karen Lesley Moore	4th Runner-up	
1982	Wales	Holt	Michele Donnelly	Unplaced	
1982	Scotland	—	Georgina Kearney	Unplaced	
1982	England	Grimsby	Della Frances Dolan	Top 12	
1981	Wales	Newport	Karen Ruth Stannard	Unplaced	
1981	Scotland	—	Anne McFarlane	Unplaced	
1981	England	Manchester	Joanna Longley	Unplaced	
1980	Wales	—	Kim Ashfield	Unplaced	
1980	Scotland	—	Linda Gallagher	1st Runner-up	
1980	England	Blackpool	Julie Duckworth	Unplaced	
1979	Wales	Sandycroft	Janet Beverly Hobson	Top 12	
1979	Scotland	Glasgow	Lorraine Davidson	Top 12	
1979	England	Yelverton	Carolyn Ann Seaward	2nd Runner-up	Miss Photogenic
1978	Wales	Welshpool	Elizabeth Ann Jones	Unplaced	
1978	Scotland	Cupar	Angela Mary Kate Macleod	Unplaced	
1978	England	Manchester	Beverly Isherwood	Unplaced	
1977	Wales	—	Christine Anne Murphy	Unplaced	
1977	Scotland	Motherwell	Sandra Bell	2nd Runner-up	
1977	England	Bristol	Sarah Louise Long	Unplaced	
1976	Wales	Denbighshire	Sian Adey-Jones	2nd Runner-up	
1976	Scotland	Glasgow	Carol Jean Grant	3rd Runner-up	
1976	England	Manchester	Pauline Bull	Top 12	Miss Photogenic
1975	Wales	Cardiff	Georgina Kerler	Unplaced	
1975	Scotland	Glasgow	Mary Kirkwood	Unplaced	
1975	England	London	Vicki Harris	Top 12	
1974	Wales	Cardiff	Helen Morgan	1st Runner-up	
1974	Scotland	Aberdeen	Catherine Robertson	Unplaced	
1974	England	Rochdale	Kathleen Ann Celeste Anders	Top 12	
1973	Wales	Newport	Deirdre Jennifer	Unplaced	
1973	Scotland	—	Caroline Meade	Unplaced	
1973	England	London	Veronica Ann Cross	Unplaced	
1972	Wales	—	Eileen Darroch	Unplaced	
1972	Scotland	Glasgow	Elizabeth Joan Stevely	Unplaced	
1972	England	London	Jennifer Mary McAdam	4th Runner-up	
1971	Wales	—	Dawn Cater	Unplaced	
1971	Scotland	—	Elizabeth Montgomery	Unplaced	
1971	England	New Milton	Marilyn Ann Ward	Top 12	
1970	Wales	Glamorgan	Sandra Cater	Unplaced	
1970	Scotland	Wishaw	Lee Hamilton Marshall	Unplaced	
1970	England	Nantwich	Yvonne Anne Ormes	Unplaced	
1969	Wales	Colwyn Bay	Shirley Jones	Unplaced	
1969	Scotland	—	Sheena Drumond	Unplaced	
1969	England	London	Myra Van Heck	Unplaced	
1968	Wales	Swansea	Judith Radford	Unplaced	
1968	Scotland	Glasgow	Helen Davidson	Unplaced	
1968	England	Manchester	Jennifer Lowe Summers	Top 15	
1967	Wales	—	Denise Elizabeth Page	Top 15	
1967	Scotland	—	Lena MacGarvie	Unplaced	
1967	England	Leicester	Jennifer Lynn Lewis	2nd Runner-up	
1966	Wales	—	Christine Heller	Unplaced	
1966	Scotland	—	Linda Ann Lees	Unplaced	
1966	England	London	Janice Carol Whiteman	Top 15	
1965	Wales	—	Joan Boull	Unplaced	
1965	Scotland	—	Mary Young	Unplaced	
1965	England	—	Jennifer Warren Gurley	Unplaced	
1964	Wales	—	Marilyn Joy Samuel	Unplaced	
1964	Scotland	—	Wendy Barrie	Unplaced	
1964	England	London	Brenda Blackler	1st Runner-up	
1963	Wales	—	Maureen Thomas	Unplaced	
1963	Scotland	—	Grace Calder Taylor	Unplaced	Miss Congeniality
1963	England	London	Susan Pratt	Withdrew	
1962	Wales	—	Hazel Williams	Unplaced	
1962	Scotland	—	Vera Parker	Unplaced	
1962	England	London	Kim Carlton	Top 15	Miss Photogenic; Best National Costume
1961	Wales	—	Rosemarie Frankland†	1st Runner-up	
1961	Scotland	—	Susan Jones	Top 15	
1961	England	London	Arlette Dobson	3rd Runner-up	
Eric Morley "Miss England" directorship — a franchise holder to Miss Universe between 1950―1960
1960	England	London	Joan Ellinor Boardman	Top 15	
1959	England	London	Pamela Anne Searle	3rd Runner-up	Miss Photogenic
1958	England	London	Dorothy Hazeldine	Unplaced	
1957	England	London	Sonia Hamilton	2nd Runner-up	
1956	England	London	Iris Alice Kathleen Waller	3rd Runner-up	
1955	England	London	Margaret Rowe	Top 16	Most Popular Girl
Holiday Princess of Great Britain – Butlin Company directorship — a franchise holder to Miss Universe in 1952
Did not compete between 1953—1954
1952	England	London	Aileen Chase	Unplaced	
