= Chloe-Beth Morgan =

Welsh beauty queen (born Feb 28th 1986)

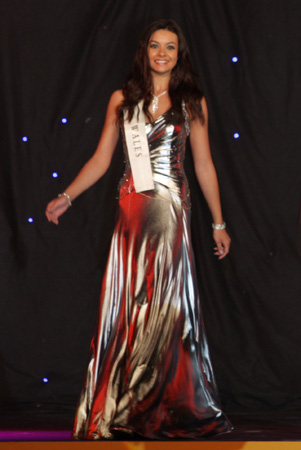
- Morgan at Miss Wales 2008
- Born: 1986 (age 39–40); Cwmbran, Wales
- Height: 5 ft (1.5 m)
- Beauty pageant titleholder
- Title: Miss Wales 2008 (Winner); Miss World 2008 (unplaced); Miss United Kingdom 2008 (Winner); Miss International 2009 (2nd Runner Up); Miss Universe Great Britain 2011 (Winner); Miss Universe 2011 (unplaced)

Chloe-Beth Morgan (born 1986) is a Welsh model and beauty pageant titleholder who won Miss Wales 2008 contest and competed in the Miss World 2008 competition held in South Africa, later that year.

Morgan scored the highest among the British delegates in Miss World 2008 and was chosen to represent the United Kingdom in Miss International 2009, where she placed third. She has a national diploma with a distinction in musical theatre, and qualified as a fitness instructor. she also won Miss Universe Great Britain 2011 and she represented Great Britain at the Miss Universe 2011 pageant in Brazil.

Honorary titles
Preceded by Nieve Jennings	Miss United Kingdom; 2008	Succeeded by Katharine Brown
Preceded by Kelly-Louise Pesticcio	Miss Wales; 2008	Succeeded by Lucy Whitehouse
Preceded by Tara Hoyos-Martínez	Miss Universe Great Britain; 2011	Succeeded by Holly Hale
