= Miss Wales =

Beauty pageant

- Formation: 1961 (for Miss Universe); 1999 (for Miss World)
- Type: Beauty pageant
- Headquarters: Cardiff
- Location: Wales
- Official language: English
- National Directors: Paula Abbandonato and Clare Birt
- Affiliations: Miss World; Miss Universe; Miss Supranational
- Website: Official website

Miss Wales is a national beauty pageant in Wales.

== Rules ==
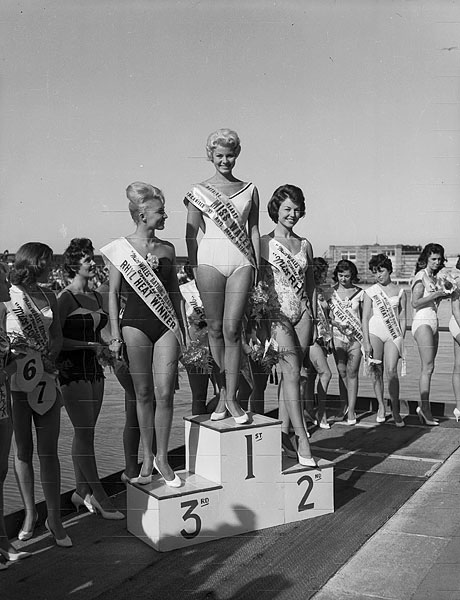
Miss Wales, 15 September 1960 at Rhyl

Miss Wales is open to unmarried women from age 16 to age 24, and is organized by Vibe Models. Contestants must not have had children, must be British citizens and must reside in Wales. Winners are expected to support "Welsh issues, charities, or other good causes ". There is also a corresponding Mister Wales contest for men.

== Miss World from Wales ==
In 1961, Rosemarie Frankland finished first runner-up at Miss Universe 1961, she then became the first Welsh woman to win Miss United Kingdom. In the same year, she became the first British woman to win Miss World.

Miss Wales 1974, Helen Morgan, had the same achievement as Rosemarie Frankland, when she finished as first runner-up at Miss Universe 1974, before going to win Miss United Kingdom and Miss World. At Miss World however, she was removed only four days after her win, when it was discovered that she was an unmarried mother (and so ineligible). Morgan did not actually break any rules, as the rules only stated that the contestants must not be married and made no mention of motherhood.

== Wales at Miss World since 1999 ==
Wales has been taking part in the Miss World pageant since devolution in 1999. The first woman to compete at Miss World as Miss Wales was Clare Daniels, who competed alongside Stephanie Norrie who was Miss Scotland. The final Miss United Kingdom contest had already taken place earlier in the year, so at Miss World 1999, there was the unusual situation of a Miss UK competing along with the Miss Scotland and Miss Wales winners. Miss England and Miss Northern Ireland competed at the Miss World contest for the first time at Miss World 2000.

Since 1999, the highest placed contestant from the four constituent countries of the UK wins the Miss United Kingdom title. Three Welsh women have won. In 2004, Amy Guy became the only British woman to be named as one of the 15 semifinalists, after winning the fast track event Sports Competition, becoming the first contestant Miss Wales to advance to the semifinals. Chloe-Beth Morgan won Miss UK 2008. She then went on to compete as Miss United Kingdom at Miss International 2009 and was second runner-up. In 2012, Sophie Moulds achieved the highest placement ever among the four constituent countries when she finished as first runner-up. She also won both the Beach Fashion award and the Continental Queen of Europe title.

== Titleholders ==
Colour key

- Declared as the winner
- Finished as a runner-up
- Finished as one of the finalists or semifinalists

=== 1999–present ===
The winner of Miss Wales represents her country at Miss World. On occasion, when the winner does not qualify (due to age) for either contest, a runner-up is sent.

Year	Miss Wales	Placement at Miss World	Special awards	Placement at Miss UK
2027	Ellie Corcoran	TBA	TBA	
2026	Helena Hawke	Top 40		
2025	Millie-Mae Adams	Top 20	Head to Head Challenge; Beauty With a Purpose; Top 24 at Miss World Talent	
2024	No competition held			
2023	Darcey Corria	Top 40		
2022	Miss World 2021 was rescheduled to 16 March 2022 due to the COVID-19 pandemic outbreak in Puerto Rico, no edition started in 2022			
2021	Olivia Harris	Unplaced		
2020	Due to the impact of COVID-19 pandemic, no pageant in 2020			
2019	Gabriella Jukes	Top 40	Top 40 at Miss World Top Model; Top 27 at Miss World Talent	
2018	Bethany Harris	Unplaced		
2017	Hannah Williams	Unplaced		
2016	Ffion Moyle	Unplaced		
2015	Emma Jenkins	Unplaced	Top 14 at Miss World Talent	
2014	Alice Ford	Unplaced	4th Runner Up at Miss World Sport	
2013	Gabrielle Shaw	Unplaced	Top 12 at Miss World Talent	
2012	Sophie Moulds	1st Runner-Up	Queen of Europe; Miss World Beach Beauty	Winner
2011	Sara Manchipp	Unplaced		
2010	Courtenay Hamilton	Unplaced		
2009	Lucy Whitehouse	Unplaced		
2008	Chloe-Beth Morgan	Unplaced		Winner
2007	Kelly-Louise Pesticcio	Unplaced		
2006	Sarah Fleming	Unplaced		
2005	Claire Evans	Unplaced		
2004	Amy Guy	Top 15	Miss World Sport	Winner
2003	Imogen Thomas	Unplaced		
2002	Michelle Bush	Unplaced		
2001	Charlotte Faicheney	Unplaced		
2000	Sophie Kate Cahill	Unplaced		
1999	Clare Daniel	Unplaced		

=== 1961–1998 ===
Year	Miss Wales	Notes
1998	Anna Bartley	
1997	Melanie Jones	
1996	Sarah Smart	
1995	Rachael Liza Warner	Later Miss United Kingdom 1996
1994	Julie Davies	
1993	Lisa Roberts	
1992	Natalie Lee	
1991	Sharon Dale Isherwood	
1990	Jane Lloyd	
1989	Suzanne Younger	Later Miss United Kingdom 1989 and Top 10 of Miss World 1989
1988	Lise Williams	
1987	Nicola Davies	
1986	Tracy Rowlands	
1985	Barbara Christian	Later Miss United Kingdom 1985 2nd runner-up
1984	Jane Riley	
1983	Lianne Gray	
1982	Caroline Williams	
1981	Sally Douglas Williams	
1980	Kim Ashfield	Later Miss United Kingdom 1980 and Miss World 1980 4th runner-up
1979	Beverley Neals	
1978	Elizabeth Ann Jones	Later Miss United Kingdom 1978 and Miss World 1978 5th runner-up
1977	Christine Anne Murphy	
1976	Sian Helen Adey-Jones	Later Miss Universe 1976 2nd runner-up and Miss United Kingdom 1976 1st runner-up
1975	Georgina Kerler	
1974	Helen Elizabeth Morgan	Later Miss Universe 1974 1st runner-up, Miss United Kingdom 1974 and Miss World 1974 (resigned after four days due to being the mother of an 18-month-old son)
1973	Deirdre Jennifer Greenland	
1972	Eileen Darroch	
1971	Dawn Cater	
1970	Sandra Cater	
1969	Shirley Jones	
1968	Judith Radford	
1967	Denise Elizabeth Page	Later Top 15 of Miss Universe 1967
1966	Christine Heller	
1965	Joan Boull	
1964	Veda Kathleen McCarthy	
1963	Maureen Thomas	
1962	Hazel Williams	Later Miss Congeniality (tie with Dominican Republic) of Miss Universe 1962
1961	Rosemarie Frankland†	Later Miss Universe 1961 1st Runner-up, Miss United Kingdom 1961 and Miss World 1961
1957	Valerie Parkinson	Also Miss Top of the Milk
1953	Hazel Roper	
1952	Betty Geary	

=== Miss Supranational Wales ===
- : Declared as Winner
- : Ended as runner-up or top 5/6 qualification
- : Ended as one of the finalists or semifinalists
- : Ended as special awards winner

Year	Miss Supranational Wales	Placement at Miss Supranational	Special Awards
2023	Did not compete		
2022	Did not compete		
2021	Did not compete		
2020	Due to the impact of COVID-19 pandemic, no competition held		
2019	Emily Ryan	Unplaced	
2018	Did not compete		
2017	Rachel Tate	Top 25	
2016	Joey Staerkle	Unplaced	
2015	Jade McQueen	Unplaced	
2014	Harriet Cole	Unplaced	
2013	Fallon Robinson	Unplaced	
2012	Sophie Jayne Hall	Unplaced	
2011	Rachelle Perez	Unplaced	
2010	Chloe Whittock	Unplaced	

== See also ==
- Miss England
- Miss Northern Ireland
- Miss Scotland
- Miss Universe Great Britain
