= Gayle Williamson =

British model

Gayle Williamson (born c. 1980) is a model and beauty pageant titleholder who won Miss Northern Ireland 2002 and Miss United Kingdom 2002.

== Personal life ==
Williamson, lives in Crawfordsburn, County Down, with her son Brandon from a relationship with Irish musician Jim Corr.

Preceded by Angela McCarthy (2001)	Miss Northern Ireland; 2002	Succeeded by Diana Sayers (2003)

Preceded by Juliet-Jane Horne (2001)	Miss United Kingdom; 2002	Succeeded by Nicci Jolly (2003)
