= Kim Ashfield =

British model

- Born: 5 January 1959 (age 67); Cardiff, Wales
- Beauty pageant titleholder
- Title: Miss United Kingdom 1980
- Major competitions: Miss World 1980 (4th Runner-Up)

Kim Ashfield (born 5 January 1959) is a Welsh former model and beauty pageant titleholder who was awarded the title of Miss United Kingdom 1980. As Miss Wales, she competed in Miss Universe 1980. As Miss United Kingdom, she placed as the 4th runner-up in Miss World 1980.

== Pageants ==
Ashfield won the Miss Wales title early in 1980 and went on to represent Wales at Miss Universe 1980 on 8 July in Seoul, where she was unplaced. She then won the Miss United Kingdom title. 1st runner-up was Nicky Poole and 2nd runner-up was that years Miss England, Julie Duckworth. Ashfield was only the fourth Welsh woman to win the Miss UK title, after Rosemarie Frankland in 1961, Helen Morgan in 1974, both of whom went on to win the Miss World title and Elizabeth Jones in 1978 (6th at Miss World). On 13 November at Miss World 1980 in London, Ashfield became the third Welsh woman to reach the top five of the Miss World contest. The following years Miss United Kingdom, Michelle Donnelly, was also Welsh and also placed fifth at Miss World 1981. It would be over thirty years until a Welsh contestant returned to the top five, when Sophie Moulds was 1st runner-up at Miss World 2012.

== Filmography ==
- A View to a Kill (1985) – The Girl

Awards and achievements
Preceded by Carolyn Seaward	Miss United Kingdom; 1980	Succeeded by Michele Donnelly
