= Miss Scotland =

Beauty pageant

- Formation: 1961
- Type: Beauty pageant
- Headquarters: Glasgow
- Location: Scotland
- Members: Miss World; Miss Supranational
- Official language: English
- Website: https://www.theofficialmissscotland.com/

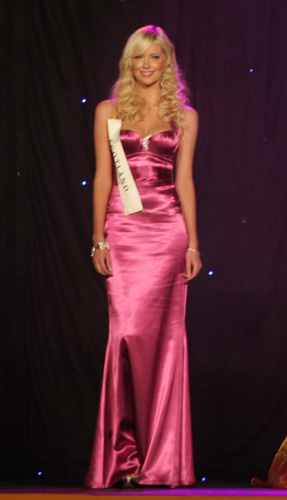
Stephanie Willemse, Miss Scotland 2008

Miss Scotland is a national beauty pageant in Scotland. Entrants must hold a British passport to enter. The contest, whose title is owned by the Miss World organisation, is organised each year by Janis Sue Smith Director of The Catwalk Academy

The winner of the Miss Scotland competition, along with the winners of Miss England, Miss Northern Ireland and Miss Wales, can compete in Miss World. The highest-ranking competitor of the four constituent country entrants is then presented with the title and crown of Miss United Kingdom, and will later compete in Miss International.

== History ==
From 1961 to 1990, the winners of Miss Scotland went on to compete at the Miss Universe pageant, usually held in the summer. They would then compete, along with the winners of Miss England, Miss Wales and Miss Northern Ireland, and other top contenders from the regional competitions, in the Miss United Kingdom pageant, with the winner of Miss UK going on to compete at the Miss World pageant in November.

During the 1990s there was no Miss Scotland at Miss Universe.

In 1999, after Scottish devolution, Miss Scotland was allowed to enter the Miss World pageant. The first Miss Scotland to compete in Miss World was Stephanie Norrie; she competed alongside Miss Wales, who was Clare Daniels, and Nicola Willoughby, who won the last Miss United Kingdom pageant that year. Miss England and Miss Northern Ireland first competed at Miss World in 2000. Since then, the highest ranking of the four UK contestants has won the Miss United Kingdom title. In recent years the Miss UK titleholder has also been offered the chance to participate at the following year's Miss International pageant, as Miss UK.

In the 21st century, the Miss Scotland contest has enjoyed a high profile, with sponsorship from the Scottish Sun newspaper. Miss Scotland has also been the most successful of the four UK nations at Miss World. Since 2000, the Miss United Kingdom title has been won by Miss Scotland nine times. England has 4 wins, Wales 3 and Northern Ireland 2 (2016 unknown).

== Titleholders ==
colorkey

- Won Miss United Kingdom
- 1st Runner-up at Miss Universe, Miss World or Miss UK
- 2nd Runner-up at Miss Universe, Miss World or Miss UK
- Finalist at Miss Universe or Miss World
- Semi-finalist or quarter-finalist at Miss Universe or Miss World

From 1961 - 1990, the winner of Miss Scotland represented her country at the Miss Universe pageant.

Year	Miss Scotland	Placement at Miss Universe	Placement at Miss UK	Placement at Miss World
1959	Isabell Rae	Did not compete	Unknown	N/A
1960	Alice Elizabeth Jones	Did not compete	Unknown	N/A
1961	Susan Karin Jones	Top 15	Unknown	N/A
1962	Vera Parker	Unplaced	Unknown	N/A
1963	Grace Calder W. Taylor	Unplaced	Unknown	N/A
1964	Wendy Barrie	Unplaced	Unknown	N/A
1964	Doreen Swan	Did not compete	Unknown	N/A
1965	Mary Young	Unplaced	Unknown	N/A
1966	Linda Ann Lees	Unplaced	Unknown	N/A
1967	Lena MacGarvie	Unplaced	Unknown	N/A
1968	Helen Davidson	Unplaced	Unknown	N/A
1969	Sheena Drummond	Unplaced	Won Miss UK	Top 15
1970	Lee Hamilton Marshall	Unplaced	2nd Runner-up	N/A
1971	Libus "Elizabeth" Montgomery	Unplaced	Top 7	N/A
1972	Elizabeth Joan Stevely	Unplaced	Unknown	N/A
1973	Caroline Meade	Unplaced	Unknown	N/A
1974	Catherine Lesley Robertson	Unplaced	Unknown	N/A
1975	Marie Kirkwood	Unplaced	Unknown	N/A
1976	Carol Jean Grant	3rd Runner-up	Won Miss UK	3rd Runner-up
1977	Sandra Bell	2nd Runner-up	Top 7	N/A
1978	Angela Mary Kate Macleod	Unplaced	Top 12	N/A
1979	Lorraine Davidson	Top 12 (10th)	1st Runner-up	N/A
1980	Linda Gallagher	1st Runner-up	Top 7	N/A
1981	Anne McFarlane	Unplaced	Did not compete	N/A
1981	Georgina Kearney	Did not compete	2nd Runner-up	N/A
1982	Georgina Kearney	Unplaced	Did not compete	N/A
1982	Lena Masterton	Did not compete	Top 7	N/A
1983	Linda Renton	Unplaced	Unplaced	N/A
1984	May Monaghan	Unplaced	Top 15	N/A
1985	Jacqueline "Jackie" Hendrie	Unplaced	Top 7	N/A
1986	Natalie M. Devlin	Unplaced	Top 15	N/A
1987	Eileen Ann Catterson	Did not compete		N/A
1988	Amanda Laird	Unplaced	Did not compete	N/A
1989	Victoria Susannah Lace	Unplaced	2nd Runner-up	N/A
1990	Karina Ferguson	Unplaced	Unknown	N/A

Notes:
- Pre 1970, only Miss United Kingdom victories are listed; whether the Miss Scotland winners in those years was a runner-up, was unplaced or even participated is unknown.
- 1963 Miss Scotland, Grace Taylor, won the Miss Congeniality award at Miss Universe 1963.
- 1964 Miss Scotland was originally 19 year-old Doreen Swan of Glasgow, but in July 1964 she pulled out of the contest after complaining she had been "over-chaperoned" and held like a "prisoner" in her hotel room. She was replaced by 21-year-old Wendy Barrie, also from Glasgow. The following year Swan, having moved to Dundee, was crowned 'Miss Arbroath'.
- 1976 Miss Scotland, Carol Jean Grant, is the only woman from Scotland to have placed in the top five at both Miss Universe and Miss World, finishing fourth at both in 1976.
- 1979 Miss Scotland, Lorraine Davidson, also placed as 3rd runner-up at Miss International 1980, competing as Miss Great Britain.
- 1987 Miss Scotland, Eileen Catterson, was disqualified from competing in the 1987 Miss Universe due to being under age (she was 17). This makes 1987 the only year in the period 1961-1990, that Scotland were not represented at Miss Universe. Catterson competed in the following year's Miss Europe pageant, but was unplaced.

=== Miss Scotland 1997-present ===
Since 1999, the winner of Miss Scotland has represented her country at the Miss World pageant.

Year	Miss Scotland	Hometown	Placement at Miss World	Miss United Kingdom
1997	Isla Sutherland	Alloa	Did not compete	N/A
1998	Laura Gilmour	Larbert	Did not compete	N/A
1999	Stephanie Norrie	Cumbernauld	Unplaced	N/A
2000	Michelle Watson	Motherwell	Unplaced	Miss UK
2001	Juliet-Jane Horne	Aberdeen	2nd Runner-Up	Miss UK
2002	Paula Murphy	Stirling	Unplaced	Unknown
2003	Nicola Jolly	Aberdeen	Unplaced	Miss UK
2004	Lois Weatherup	Linlithgow	Unplaced	Unknown
2005	Aisling Friel	Glasgow	Unplaced	Unknown
2006	Nicola McLean	Aberdeenshire	Top 17	Miss UK
2007	Nieve Jennings	Bishopbriggs	unplaced	Miss UK
2008	Stephanie Willemse	Glasgow	Unplaced	Unknown
2009	Katharine Brown	Dunblane	Unplaced	Miss UK
2010	Nicola Mimnagh	Kilbarchan	Top 25	Miss UK
2011	Jennifer Reoch	Glasgow	Top 7	1st Runner-up
2012	Nicole Treacy	Paisley	Unplaced	Unknown
2013	Jamey Bowers	Edinburgh	Unplaced	Unknown
2014	Ellie McKeating	Milngavie	Top 25	1st Runner-up
2015	Mhairi Fergusson	Stirling	Top 20	Miss UK
2016	Lucy Kerr	Glasgow	Unplaced	Unknown
2017	Romy McCahill	Milngavie	Unplaced	Unknown
2018	Linzi Mclelland	East Kilbride	Top 12	Miss UK
2019	Keryn Matthew	Edinburgh	Top 40	Unknown
2020	Due to the impact of COVID-19 pandemic, no pageant in 2020			
2021	Claudia Todd	Bothwell	Unplaced	Unknown
2022	Due to the impact of COVID-19 pandemic, no pageant in 2022			
2023	Lucy Thomson(Dethroned)	Edinburgh	Did not compete	Unknown
2023	Chelsie Allison (Assumed)	Inverness	Unplaced	Unknown
2025	Amy Scott	Strathaven	Unplaced	Unknown
2026	Eilidh MacDonald	Glasgow	Top 40	Unknown
2027	TBA	TBA	TBA	

Notes:
- At Miss World 2001, as the highest placed contestant from Europe, Juliet-Jane Horne was awarded the title of Continental Queen of Europe.
- At Miss World 2006, Nicola Mclean reached the Top 17 semi-final but was not selected as one of the 6 finalists. Her overall position was 10th.
- At Miss World 2007, Nieve Jennings was runner-up in Talent fast track and third in Sports fast track, and narrowly missed the Top 16 semifinal, finishing 17th. She was also one of the three soloists to record the Olympic anthem "Light up the Passion, Share the Dream".
- At Miss World 2011, Jennifer Reoch became Scotland's second most successful entrant of the 21st century by reaching the final seven. Miss England, Alize Mounter also reached the final seven and took the Miss UK title (Mounter was 4th overall, Reoch 7th).
- At Miss World 2015, Mhairi Fergusson's overall placement was 18th.
- Miss Scotland 2002, 2004, 2005, 2008 and 2012, did not win the Miss UK title but their UK placements are unknown.

== See also ==
- Miss England
- Miss Northern Ireland
- Miss United Kingdom
- Miss Wales
