= Miss World 1961 =

11th Miss World pageant

- Date: 9 November 1961
- Presenters: Peter West; Michael Aspel
- Venue: Lyceum Ballroom, London, United Kingdom
- Broadcaster: BBC
- Entrants: 37
- Placements: 15
- Debuts: Republic of China; Suriname
- Withdrawals: Australia; Burma; Canada; French Polynesia; Jordan; Kenya; Norway; Tanganyika
- Returns: Austria; Ceylon; New Zealand; Venezuela
- Winner: Rosemarie Frankland; United Kingdom

Miss World 1961 was the 11th edition of the Miss World pageant, held at the Lyceum Ballroom, London, United Kingdom, on 9 November 1961. Thirty-seven candidates competed in that pageant. The winner was Rosemarie Frankland, representing the United Kingdom.

== Selection of participants ==
Contestants from thirty-seven countries and territories were selected to participate in the competition. Two contestants were appointed to represent their countries/territories after being runners-up in their national competitions or were selected through a casting process.

=== Replacements ===
Miss France 1961, Luce Auger, was initially supposed to represent her country. However, she was dethroned due to already having a child. Auger was replaced by her first runner-up, Michèle Wargnier. Additionally, the third runner-up of Miss Holland 1961, Rita van Zuiden, was appointed to represent Holland because Miss Holland 1961, Anne Marie Brink, had already participated in another international beauty pageant, and one of the runners-up, Stanny van Baer, became Miss International 1961.

=== Debuts, returns, and withdrawals ===
This edition marked the debut of the Republic of China and Suriname, and the return of Austria, Ceylon, New Zealand, and Venezuela. Ceylon last competed in 1955, New Zealand in 1956, Venezuela in 1958, and Austria in 1959. Australia, Burma, French Polynesia, Canada, Jordan, Kenya, Norway, and Tanganyika withdrew from the competition due to their national organizations failed to hold a national competition or appoint a delegate.

Chriss Leon of Jamaica was originally supposed to participate. However, her boyfriend did not allow her to go to participate. Leon would instead participate the next year, in which she made into the top 15.

== Results ==
Placement	Contestant
Miss World 1961	United Kingdom – Rosemarie Frankland
1st runner-up	(Taiwan) Republic of China – Grace Li
2nd runner-up	Spain – Carmen Cervera
3rd runner-up	France – Michèle Wargnier
4th runner-up	Denmark – Inge Jörgensen
Top 7	New Zealand – Leone Main; United States – Jo Ann Odum
Top 15	Argentina – Susana Pardal; Austria – Hella Wolfsgrubej; Finland – Ritva Wächter; (Republic of Ireland) Ireland – Olive White; Japan – Chie Murakami; South Africa – Yvonne Hulley; Turkey – Güler Samuray; West Germany – Romy März

== Competition ==
=== Format ===
Several changes were implemented in this edition. The number of semi-finalists was reduced to fifteen from eighteen in the previous edition. The fifteen semi-finalists were selected through a preliminary competition held on the day of the final event, which consisted of a swimsuit and evening gown competition. The fifteen semi-finalists were interviewed by Peter West, and from them, seven finalists were chosen to proceed to the final interview.

=== Selection committee ===
- Denis Butler – 9th Earl of Lanesborough
- Norman Hartnell – English designer for Queen Elizabeth II
- La Countess Ethel Beatty – Member of the English aristocracy
- Bob Hope – English-American actor and comedian
- Frances Manners – Duchess of Rutland
- Bernard Delfont – English impresario
- Billy Butlin – English businessman
- Richard Todd – English-Irish actor
- John Spencer-Churchill – 11th Duke of Marlborough and nephew of Winston Churchill

== Contestants ==
Thirty-seven contestants competed for the title.

Country	Contestant	Age (Note: Ages at the time in the pageant)	Hometown
Argentina	Susana Pardal	22	Buenos Aires
Austria	Hella Wolfsgrubej	18	Salzburg
Belgium	Jacqueline Oroi	20	Brussels
Bolivia	Nancy Justiniano	19	Santa Cruz
Brazil	Alda Coutinho	23	Guanabara
Ceylon	Sushila Perera	19	Colombo
Cyprus	Andreava Polydorou	21	Nicosia
Denmark	Inge Jörgensen	19	Odense
Ecuador	Magdalena Dávila	-	Pichincha
Finland	Ritva Wächter	20	Helsinki
France	Michèle Wargnier	19	Paris
Greece	Efstathia Karaiskaki	22	Athens
(Netherlands) Holland	Ria van Zuiden	21	Amsterdam
Iceland	Jóhanna Kolbrún Kristjánsdóttir	-	Reykjavík
India	Veronica Torcato	25	Maharashtra
(Republic of Ireland) Ireland	Olive White	17	Dublin
Israel	Er'ela Hod	18	Tel Aviv
Italy	Franca Cattaneo	20	Genova
Japan	Chie Murakami	19	Osaka
Lebanon	Leila Antaki	22	Beirut
Luxembourg	Vicky Schoos	18	Luxembourg City
Madagascar	Jeanne Rakatomahanina	20	Diego-Suárez
New Zealand	Leone Main	20	Auckland
Nicaragua	Thelma Arana	22	Granada
(Taiwan) Republic of China	Grace Li	19	Taipei
(Federation of Rhodesia and Nyasaland) Rhodesia and Nyasaland	Angela Moorcroft	19	Salisbury
South Africa	Yvonne Hulley	19	Overberg
South Korea (Note: Competed as Korea in the pageant)	Hyun Chang-ae	19	Seoul
Spain	Carmen Cervera	18	Barcelona
Suriname	Kitty Essed	18	Paramaribo
Sweden	Ingrid Lundquist	21	Stockholm
Turkey	Güler Samuray	20	Istanbul
United Kingdom	Rosemarie Frankland	18	Lancashire
United States	Jo Ann Odum	19	Huntington
Uruguay	Roma Spadaccini Aguerre	25	Montevideo
Venezuela	Bexy Romero	18	Caracas
West Germany	Romy März	20	Munich
