= Cherie Gardiner =

Northern Irish model and beauty pageant titleholder

- Born: 1991 (age 34–35); Bangor, County Down, Northern Ireland
- Height: 1.82 m (5 ft 11 1/2 in)
- Beauty pageant titleholder
- Title: Miss Northern Ireland 2009
- Hair color: Blond
- Major competitions: Miss Northern Ireland 2009 (Winner); Miss World 2009

Cherie Louise Gardiner (born 1991) is a Northern Irish model and beauty pageant titleholder who won Miss Northern Ireland 2009 and represented her country at the Miss World 2009.

== Beauty pageant career ==
Gardiner came into prominence after winning the title of 2009 Miss Northern Ireland, in a ceremony held in the Europa Hotel in Belfast. Gardiner represented Northern Ireland at the Miss World 2009 pageant in South Africa in November 2009.
