= Celebrity Wish List =

British television series

Celebrity Wish List is an 8-part series produced by Seven8Media (formerly ID-r Media) for Channel 5 broadcast in the autumn of 2011.

The series was broadcast on Monday nights on Channel 5 at 7:30 pm. The format was that a small charity was rewarded with an awareness-raising event and a practical event to help the charity or cause grow. Each programme was hosted by a different celebrity - Michael Underwood, Stacey Solomon, Sheree Murphy, Zöe Salmon, Terri Dwyer, Jeff Brazier - and also featured a shorter strand 'Heart Warmers' hosted by the likes of Joe Swash and Ali Bastian - which were short VTs rewarding good neighbours and fundraisers.

The programme was executive produced by Rob Walker and series produced by Simon Proctor.
