= Kelly-Louise Pesticcio =

British beauty pageant contestant

Kelly-Louise Pesticcio, (born Cardiff, Wales) is a Welsh model and beauty pageant titleholder who won the title of Miss Wales 2007 and represented Wales at Miss World 2007 in Sanya, China where she finished as third runner-up in the Miss Sports Fast Track. Pesticcio, a qualified doctor, was also a finalist in the 2010 Miss Universe Great Britain pageant. She is of Italian origin.
