= Karen Mellor =

Karen Hannam (née Mellor) is a British model and beauty pageant titleholder. She won the 30th Miss United Kingdom pageant in 1987.

Mellor was discovered by a model agent while modelling bridal wear for a colleague's wife. In May 1987, she won the Miss Derby contest, qualifying her for entry to the Miss United Kingdom contest, which she won in August of that year. In the subsequent Miss World competition, Mellor placed equal tenth in the preliminary round but did not advance to the semi-final round (top 12) because the rules stated that the semi-finals had to have at least one contestant from each continent, so while contestants such as Miss Nigeria (Africa) made it through with a score of 19, Mellor (with a score of 25) did not advance.

Preceded by Alison Slack	Miss United Kingdom; 1987	Succeeded by Kirsty Roper
