= Zoe Salmon =

Northern Irish television presenter (born 1980)

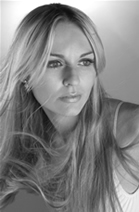
- Born: 7 January 1980 (age 46); Bangor, Northern Ireland
- Occupation: Television presenter
- Known for: Blue Peter presenter Miss Northern Ireland (1999)
- Spouse: William Corrie (m. 2016)
- Children: 1

Zoe Salmon (born 7 January 1980) is a Northern Irish television presenter. She hosted the children's television programme Blue Peter from 23 December 2004 to 25 June 2008. She also appeared on Dancing on Ice in early 2009. She was the 1999 Miss Northern Ireland.

== Life and career ==
Salmon was born in Bangor, County Down, Northern Ireland. She attended Kilmaine Primary School and Glenlola Collegiate School while growing up in Bangor, a town on the east coast of Northern Ireland which she says is her "favourite place.... It's a really pretty seaside town with a marina which is lovely in the summer". She then attended Queen's University, Belfast, where she gained a 2:1 degree in law, before qualifying as a solicitor. She was crowned Miss Northern Ireland in 1999 (beating future Big Brother contestant Orlaith McAllister). In 2009 she was placed at number 20 on FHM's 100 sexiest women.

In 2016, Salmon married William Corrie, in Barbados. On 1 April 2022, Salmon gave birth to their first child, a boy named Fitz (Fitzwilliam) Salmon-Corrie.

=== Blue Peter ===
Salmon was revealed as the 30th Blue Peter presenter on 25 October 2004. She first appeared on the show on 23 December 2004, in its Christmas special. She was originally meant to replace Liz Barker when the latter left on maternity leave; however, Barker had already returned by the time Salmon made her debut. She presented the show with Konnie Huq, Simon Thomas, Matt Baker, Liz Barker, Gethin Jones and Andy Akinwolere.

Shortly after her debut, she said "I'd Try Anything Once", which started a trend in her being asked to do dangerous or embarrassing things including wing-walking on top of an antique biplane and stamp collecting. When she mentioned in her blog on the Blue Peter website that she had an ambition to be sawn in half by a magician, viewers started a campaign for her to do a challenge where she would become a magician's assistant. This campaign was successful, and Salmon filmed a challenge where she assisted a magician with a number of illusions including levitation and a transposition illusion called "The Assistants Revenge". After the filmed segment of the challenge had been shown, the magician joined Salmon in the studio for a live performance of the sawing in half illusion, in which Salmon was sawn in half inside a clear-sided box in a version of the illusion called "Clearly Impossible".

In 2006 she made an item for the show about the making of the film St Trinians. She played a small role in the film, as a non-speaking extra.

Salmon left the show in June 2008 at the start of the summer break, at the same time as Gethin Jones.

Shortly after making her first appearance on Blue Peter, the BBC received complaints after it was alleged that her job was only advertised in Northern Ireland and Scotland, meaning they were potentially discriminating against people with certain regional accents. The BBC, however, denied any discrimination, and insisted the advertisement had been placed in newspapers throughout the UK.

Other media reports at the time "suggested she had been chosen to 'sex up' the programme and boost ratings in the competitive children’s marketplace. It is an idea denied by the producers of Blue Peter." In January 2006, novelist Kate Figes further criticised Salmon in an article in The Guardian, writing that Salmon "rarely seems comfortable around children and talks to them in slow, patronising tones. She comes over as insincere and fatuous and my daughters don't like her any more than I do." Figes claimed that Salmon was "encouraged by the programme editors to present herself as a sexual bimbo", and that the show was being "sexed up or dumbed down". Richard Marson, Blue Peter's editor, characterised the article as 'character assassination', and denied that the show was "being sexed up or dumbed down".

Salmon faced criticism when she chose a symbol for a 'Best of British' logo, to be used by British Airways to decorate a Boeing 757. She said 'I'm from Ulster, and I'd like to cover a plane with the Red Hand of Ulster: that is our proud symbol.' The symbol is frequently used by loyalists and paramilitaries, though it is also used by Republicans and nationalists and is emblazoned on the nine-county flag for the province of Ulster, as well as the old Northern Ireland flag, and by the GAA (including the Tyrone GAA's crest).. Salmon caused more controversy a week later by selecting a map of Ireland covered in the Union Jack as one of her favourites.

In 2012 using her Twitter account, Salmon spoke out against the removal of the Union flag from Belfast City Hall after Belfast City Council passed a vote stating it should only be flown on designated days.

=== Television and film appearances ===
One of her earliest roles was a quick appearance as the original bearer of the Ruby Slippers in a now lost, little known re-telling of the Wizard of Oz made for British Channel 5 in 1995. She had auditioned for the role of Dorothy, but lost to Denise van Outen.

In 2005, Salmon presented the results of the Northern Ireland region in Making Your Mind Up, the UK's national pre-selection for the Eurovision Song Contest 2005. She welcomed the television audience to Belfast with the line "How's about you, Terry?"

Salmon appeared in the 2007 version of Comic Relief Does Fame Academy, with several celebrity opponents, including BBC Sport presenter and journalist Ray Stubbs, former CBBC presenter Angellica Bell and BBC Radio 1 and BBC Radio 5 Live presenter Colin Murray. Salmon was the fifth celebrity voted out. Also in 2007, she switched on the Belfast Christmas lights with Shayne Ward.

After leaving Blue Peter in June 2008, she presented the gameshow Hot Rods which began a BBC2 run on 30 August. She joined Noel Edmonds and Same Difference as a guest at a kids' party at the Northumberland town of Morpeth which featured in 2008's Noel's Christmas Presents show on Sky1.

Salmon took part in the fourth series of Dancing on Ice, partnering Matt Evers and reached the quarter-finals.

Salmon appeared on The Chris Moyles Show in January 2009 and went on a date with early breakfast presenter Greg James as part of the BBC Radio 1 money experiment.

She appeared on the first episode of BBC One Saturday night gameshow Hole in the Wall hosted by Dale Winton. Salmon has a cameo in the CBBC sitcom Dani's House, as Dani's long lost celebrity friend 'Mo White'. In May 2009 she appeared in FHM magazine with another Blue Peter ex-presenter Konnie Huq. Two separate collectable covers were printed for the issue featuring the two women, but the content of the magazines were identical.

In 2009 she appeared on Shooting Stars on Jack Dee's team.

In 2009 she presented 8-part series Skillicious on CITV alongside Nigel Clarke. The show encouraged children to try out new skills. She loved beatboxing. She co-presented the World's Strongest Man competition in the UK with Martin Bayfield and became one of the presenters on new Sky1 live lifestyle chat show Angela and Friends.

On 15 February 2011, she presented a programme for BBC Three called The Big Fat Truth About Low Fat Foods in which she underwent an experiment whereby she agreed to be filmed during a month of eating a diet consisting of only diet and 'healthy' processed foods.

On 31 October 2011, Zoe hosted "Celebrity Wish List" on Channel 5 where she surprised 500 Scottish Young Carers at their annual weekend break by bringing McFly to perform for them and putting together a film to help the Carers secure funding for future events.

In 2011, she also co-hosted Compete for the Meat alongside Al Murray on Dave.

== Charity work ==
In 2006, Salmon ran the London Marathon and gave the money to the registered charity ChildLine.

== Filmography ==
Year	Title	Role	Notes
2004	Blue Peter	Herself	Main presenter until June 2008
2005	Making Your Mind Up	Herself	Delivered the votes from Northern Ireland
2005	Totally Blue Peter	Magazine Boss (villain)	Main role
2006	Comic Relief Does Fame Academy	Herself	Contestant (out fifth)
2006	St Trinian's	Cameo	Guest appearance
2008	Best of Friends	Herself	Guest presenter on activity special alongside Iwan Thomas
2008	The Weakest Link	Herself	Contestant on Blue Peter Special
2008	Bratz Academy	Herself	Presenter
2008	Dani's House	Molly White	Guest role
2008	Hot Rods	Herself	Main presenter
2008	SMart	Herself	Guest presenter 1 episode
2008	Hole in the Wall	Herself	Contestant on episode 1
2008	Noel's Christmas Presents	Herself	Guest at party for children of Morpeth
2009	Dancing on Ice	Herself	Contestant (5th place)
2009	Shooting Stars	Herself	Team contestant
2009	Angela and Friends	Herself	Panellist, Book expert
2009	Worlds Strongest Man 2009	Herself	Co-presenter
2010	Get Him to the Greek	Herself/cameo	Journalist
2010	The Love Bus	Herself	Presenter
2011	The Big Fat Truth About Low Fat Foods	Herself	Presenter
2011	Celebrity Wish List	Herself	Presenter, episode 5 'Scottish Young Carers'
2012	Celebrity Masterchef	Herself	Contestant
2015	Pointless Celebrities	Herself	Contestant
2016	Celebrity Island with Bear Grylls	Herself	Contestant

Preceded by Joanne Salley (1998)	Miss Northern Ireland; 1999	Succeeded by Julie Martin (2000)
