= Nicola Mimnagh =

Scottish beauty pageant titleholder

- Born: Nicola Mimnagh; 31 December 1985 (age 40); Kilbarchan, Scotland
- Height: 1.80 m (5 ft 11 in)
- Beauty pageant titleholder
- Title: Miss Scotland 2010; Miss United Kingdom 2010
- Hair color: Brown
- Eye color: Hazel
- Major competitions: Miss Scotland 2010 (Winner); Miss World 2010 (Top 25); Miss United Kingdom 2010 (Winner); Miss International 2011

Nicola Mimnagh (born 31 December 1985) is a Scottish model and beauty pageant titleholder who was crowned Miss Scotland 2010 and also Miss United Kingdom 2010.

== Miss Scotland ==
At George Square in Glasgow on 19 June 2010, Mimnagh was crowned Miss Scotland 2010 by the outgoing 2009 titleholder Katharine Brown.

== Miss United Kingdom ==
Mimnagh, who stands 1.80 m (5 ft 11 in), represented Scotland in the 2010 Miss World pageant, finishing her participation as one of the Top 25 semifinalists.

She was named Miss United Kingdom 2010, for finishing ahead of her rivals from the other UK countries in Miss World 2010.

Honorary titles
Preceded by Katharine Brown	Miss United Kingdom; 2010	Succeeded by Alize Lily Mounter
Preceded by Katharine Brown	Miss Scotland; 2010	Succeeded by Jennifer Reoch
