= I'll Take Sweden =

1965 US comedy film by Frederick de Cordova

- Movie poster
- Directed by: Frederick de Cordova
- Screenplay by: Nat Perrin
- Story by: Nat Perrin; Bob Fisher; Arthur Marx
- Produced by: Edward Small
- Starring: Bob Hope; Tuesday Weld; Frankie Avalon
- Cinematography: Daniel L. Fapp
- Edited by: Grant Whytock
- Music by: William "By" Dunham; Jimmie Haskell
- Production company: Edward Small Productions
- Distributed by: United Artists
- Release date: June 18, 1965 (USA)
- Running time: 97 min.
- Country: United States
- Language: English
- Box office: $1.5 million

I'll Take Sweden is a 1965 American comedy film. It was directed by Frederick de Cordova, and stars Bob Hope, Frankie Avalon, and Tuesday Weld.

== Plot ==
Single father Bob Holcomb, a widower, is unhappy with the guitar-playing boy Kenny his daughter JoJo chooses as a husband-to-be. An executive with an oil company, Bob accepts a transfer to the firm's Stockholm branch and he takes JoJo along, hoping it will distract her.

Sweden turns out to be far more liberal sexually than the United States. Bob, having met an attractive interior designer, Karin, decides to take her away for a romantic weekend at a mountain resort.

JoJo has accepted an offer to go to a jazz festival from Erik, who is Bob's new assistant. Originally seen as a respectable suitor, Erik turns out to be a playboy and a cad. A girl thought to be his cousin, Marti, is actually a former girlfriend.

Bob invites Kenny to Sweden in an attempt to get Kenny and JoJo together. Kenny is invited by Erik to have dinner with Marti and also to the festival.

Bob sends Erik to Saudi Arabia but he does not go, sending his subordinate. He also tells JoJo he is going away for work but he really goes with Karin to a resort, but stops at the festival on the way.

Kenny takes Marti to the festival. JoJo spies her father in the restaurant at the festival while talking to him on the phone. He is still claiming to be working while she is supposed to be home alone. After originally telling Erik she wanted to go home, she tells him she now wants to go to the same resort her father is heading to.

Marti tells Kenny she is not really Erik's cousin and both admit they are in love with their former partners. They also decide to go to the mountain resort. At the resort where the three couples continue to awkwardly encounter one another. Kenny finally has his fill of Erik, knocking him out with his guitar.

On a voyage home, the ship's captain performs a double wedding ceremony that turns out to be invalid due to a navigation error. so it needs to be done again.

== Cast ==
Actor	Role
Bob Hope	Bob Holcomb
Tuesday Weld	JoJo Holcomb
Frankie Avalon	Kenny Klinger
Dina Merrill	Karin Granstedt
Jeremy Slate	Erik Carlson
Rosemarie Frankland	Marti
John Qualen	Olaf

== Production notes ==
=== Development ===
The film was announced in April 1964 with Hope and Weld attached from the beginning.

In July Frederick de Cordova was announced as director.

The movie was advertised as being Hope's 50th but even he disputed that.

=== Filming ===
Filming started August 1964. The parts of the movie that were supposed to be in Sweden were shot at Big Bear Lake and Lake Arrowhead, California.

Director Frederick De Cordova saw Luci Baines Johnson, daughter of President Lyndon B. Johnson, dance the Watusi at a White House barbecue. He offered her a role in the film but she declined on the grounds she had to go to school. Billie Dove visited the set and Bob Hope offered her a role too but the former star declined.

== Critical reception ==
Howard Thompson of The New York Times loathed the film: "The picture is an altogether asinine little romp . . . Nothing can save this tattered, old-fashioned dip." At least one exhibitor had his complaints published: "Bob Hope is no good in this picture. No plot. Corny. No good for a double feature."

Variety called it "a brisk and tuneful comedy." Other reviews were mixed. Filmink felt the film ad "a superb idea for a comedy, but it was not exploited properly... Instead, we get a cringey “silent majority” style late period Hope movie, which never feels as though it takes place in Sweden. Avalon’s performance is utterly fine, completely professional – it’s not his fault that the film isn’t good."

Hope was so impressed with Avalon's work, he signed Avalon to appear on his television show.

== See also ==
- List of American films of 1965
