= Sian Adey-Jones =

Welsh glamour model (born 1957)

- Born: December 1957 (age 68); Bodfari, Denbighshire, Wales
- Occupation: Glamour model

Sian Adey-Jones (born December 1957) is a Welsh glamour model and beauty pageant titleholder.

Adey-Jones was born at Bodfari, Denbighshire, Wales. She won the Miss Wales title in 1976 and was second runner-up in Miss Universe 1976. She then finished first runner-up in Miss United Kingdom 1976 behind Carol Grant, who as Miss Scotland had finished one place behind Adey-Jones at the Miss Universe contest. Adey-Jones also took part in Miss International 1977, competing as Miss Britain.

She subsequently turned to topless modelling, regularly appearing as a Page 3 girl in The Sun newspaper, as well as a rare fully nude appearance in the September 1983 edition of Mayfair (vol.18, #9). She also had a background role in the 1985 Bond movie A View to a Kill.

In 1978, to celebrate Britain's only team to qualify for the Argentina World Cup, she appeared in the Daily Mirror wearing just a Scotland football shirt.

She now lives on the island of Ibiza with her two children. She has a son Dylan (born 1993) and adopted daughter Tallulah.

== Filmography ==
- A View to a Kill (1985) - The Girl
