= Joanne Salley =

British model

Joanne Salley (born 1977, Dungannon) is the 1998 Miss Northern Ireland, later an art teacher and part-time television presenter.

Educated at the Royal School Dungannon, she trained in ballet for fifteen years. She has a teaching certificate from a Cambridge College. She was named 1998 Miss Northern Ireland, and came runner-up in the Miss United Kingdom pageant. She was a mascot for the 1998 Milk Cup football tournament. She became a teacher and an occasional television reporter/presenter. Starting out her teaching career at Harrow School, she then joined Merchant Taylors' School, Northwood, before returning to Harrow for a second period in 2010.

She once co-hosted The Big Breakfast, worked for Comic Relief does Fame Academy, Disney and as a researcher for the BBC's Hard Sell. Appearances in television advertisements include the Peugeot 106. In October 2011, she co-hosted the BBC series Out of the Blue.

== Personal life ==
Salley plays polo. She has raised funds for charity by running the New York Marathon, climbed Mount Kilimanjaro and visited the site of the world's highest active volcano in Ecuador where she helped build a school for an isolated community.

In 2011, photos taken by professional photographer and part-time teaching colleague Fiona Corthine, of Salley posing topless were found on a memory stick, which had been forgotten in a school photographic studio, by a Harrow pupil. They were distributed around the school and were also sent to boys at Merchant Taylors' School, Northwood, Hertfordshire, where Salley had taught previously.

Preceded by Julie Martin (1997)	Miss Northern Ireland; 1998	Succeeded by Zöe Salmon (1999)
