= Miss Universe Great Britain 2019 =

Beauty pageant edition

- Date: 13 July 2019
- Venue: Mercure Holland House Cardiff, Cardiff, Wales
- Entrants: 33
- Placements: 15
- Winner: Emma Jenkins; Wales
- Photogenic: Emma Jenkins, Wales
- Miss Amity: Lauren Fox, Surrey

Miss Universe Great Britain 2019 was the 11th edition of the Miss Universe Great Britain pageant, held at the Mercure Holland House Cardiff in Cardiff, Wales, on July 13, 2019.

Dee-Ann Kentish-Rogers of Birmingham crowned Emma Jenkins of Wales as her successor at the end of the event. Jenkins represented Great Britain at the Miss Universe 2019.

== Results ==
=== Placements ===
| Placement | Contestant |
|---|---|
| Miss Universe Great Britain 2019 | Wales – Emma Jenkins |
| 1st Runner-Up | South Yorkshire – Erin Williams |
| 2nd Runner-Up | East Scotland – Cara Frew |
| Top 5 | North West England – Megan Vincetta; South Lanarkshire – Amy Meisak |
| Top 10 | Capital City – Salina Zafar; Central London – Gemma Gordon; Gibraltar – Joseanne Bear; Greater London – Charlotte Brooke; South London – Udo Emeka-Okafor |
| Top 15 | Liverpool – Jessica Page; Stirling – Christina Chalk; Surrey – Lauren Fox; Westminster – Zania Linton; West Yorkshire – Nicole Henao |

=== Special awards ===
| Award | Contestant |
|---|---|
| Miss Amity | Surrey – Lauren Fox |
| Miss Photogenic | Wales – Emma Jenkins |

== Official Delegates ==
Forty contestants competed for the title.

| Represented | Candidate | Age | Height | Hometown | Country |
|---|---|---|---|---|---|
| Aberdeenshire | Sarah Clark | 20 | 1.71 m (5 ft 7 1/2 in) | Fraserburgh | Scotland |
| Birmingham | Sacha Jones | 19 | 1.79 m (5 ft 10 1/2 in) | Birmingham | England |
| Capital City | Salina Zafar | 26 | 1.73 m (5 ft 8 in) | London | England |
| Central England | Charlotte Hill | 19 | 1.74 m (5 ft 8 1/2 in) | Leicester | England |
| Central London | Gemma Gordon | 24 | 1.71 m (5 ft 7 1/2 in) | London | England |
| East England | Charlotte White | 27 | 1.76 m (5 ft 9 1/2 in) | Rickmansworth | England |
| East London | Ola Altatishe | 26 | 1.78 m (5 ft 10 in) | London | England |
| (England) East Midlands | Saffron Corcoran | 22 | 1.73 m (5 ft 8 in) | Towcester | England |
| East Scotland | Cara Frew | 27 | 1.80 m (5 ft 11 in) | Dundee | Scotland |
| (England) Fareham | Allys Miller | 24 | 1.76 m (5 ft 9 1/2 in) | Fareham | England |
| Gibraltar | Joseanne Bear | 26 | 1.83 m (6 ft 0 in) | Gibraltar | British Overseas Territories |
| Greater London | Charlotte Brooke | 25 | 1.76 m (5 ft 9 1/2 in) | London | England |
| Greenwich, London | Tasharn Sanganoo | 20 | 1.73 m (5 ft 8 in) | Greenwich | England |
| Jersey | Amena Hassan | 25 | 1.73 m (5 ft 8 in) | Saint Helier | Crown dependencies |
| Kent | Sarah Jegede | 27 | 1.79 m (5 ft 10 1/2 in) | Kent | England |
| (Scotland) Lanarkshire | Alexandra Prior | 27 | 1.79 m (5 ft 10 1/2 in) | Bothwell | Scotland |
| (England) Liverpool | Jessica Page | 23 | 1.74 m (5 ft 8 1/2 in) | Liverpool | England |
| North East England | Jade Bambrough | 25 | 1.75 m (5 ft 9 in) | Sunderland | England |
| North England | Christina Cunningham | 27 | 1.74 m (5 ft 8 1/2 in) | Bolton | England |
| North London | Umida Ibrahimova | 26 | 1.75 m (5 ft 9 in) | London | England |
| North West England | Megan Vincetta | 27 | 1.75 m (5 ft 9 in) | Liverpool | England |
| (England) Norwich | Brooke Smith | 20 | 1.86 m (6 ft 1 in) | Norwich | England |
| (Scotland) Scottish Borders | Caitlin Thomson | 19 | 1.81 m (5 ft 11 1/2 in) | Peebles | Scotland |
| South East England | Victoria Small | 25 | 1.79 m (5 ft 10 1/2 in) | Reading | England |
| South England | Jessica Ruan | 25 | 1.75 m (5 ft 9 in) | Slough | England |
| (Scotland) South Lanarkshire | Amy Meisak | 25 | 1.73 m (5 ft 8 in) | Hamilton | Scotland |
| South London | Udo Emeka-Okafor | 18 | 1.84 m (6 ft 1/2 in) | London | England |
| South Wales | Amie Barlow | 24 | 1.79 m (5 ft 10 1/2 in) | Caerphilly | Wales |
| South West England | Shireen Kay | 19 | 1.77 m (5 ft 9 1/2 in) | Sidmouth | England |
| South Yorkshire | Erin Williams | 21 | 1.75 m (5 ft 9 in) | Sheffield | England |
| (Scotland) Stirling | Christina Chalk | 24 | 1.76 m (5 ft 9 1/2 in) | Dunblane | Scotland |
| Surrey | Lauren Fox | 23 | 1.72 m (5 ft 7 1/2 in) | Epsom | England |
| Wales | Emma Jenkins | 26 | 1.75 m (5 ft 9 in) | Llanelli | Wales |
| (England) Watford | Archna Bhatt | 25 | 1.70 m (5 ft 7 in) | Watford | England |
| West London | Farhia Ali | 26 | 1.70 m (5 ft 7 in) | London | England |
| (West Midlands (county)) West Midlands | Sophie Dunning | 26 | 1.78 m (5 ft 10 in) | Telford | England |
| Westminster, London | Zania Linton | 24 | 1.7 m (5 ft 7 in) | Westminster | England |
| West Yorkshire | Nicole Henao | 26 | 1.75 m (5 ft 9 in) | Leeds | England |
| (England) Yorkshire and the Humber | Andrea Holzhauser | 21 | 1.75 m (5 ft 9 in) | Sheffield | England |
