= Katharine Brown =

Scottish beauty pageant titleholder

- Born: 7 April 1987 (age 39); Scotland
- Height: 5 ft 11 in (1.80 m)
- Beauty pageant titleholder
- Title: Miss Scotland 2009; Miss United Kingdom 2010
- Hair color: Blonde
- Eye color: Green
- Major competitions: Miss Scotland 2009 (Winner); Miss World 2009 Miss United Kingdom 2010 (Winner); Miss International 2010

Katharine Brown (born 7 April 1987) is a Scottish model and beauty pageant titleholder who was crowned Miss Scotland 2009 and Miss United Kingdom 2010. Katharine attended Dunblane High School.

== Miss World 2009 ==
Brown represented Scotland at the Miss World 2009 pageant which was held in Johannesburg on 12 December 2009. She placed 2nd runner-up at the Beach Beauty fast track event and was one of the top 12 finalists at Miss World Top Model.

== Miss International 2010 ==
As the highest-ranked British delegate at Miss World, Brown was named Miss United Kingdom, gaining the right to represent the UK at the Miss International 2010 pageant in China, where she was one of 70 delegates competing for the title.

Honorary titles
Preceded by Chloe-Beth Morgan	Miss United Kingdom; 2009	Succeeded by Nicola Mimnagh
Preceded by Stephanie Willemse	Miss Scotland; 2009	Succeeded by Nicola Mimnagh
