= Lisa Lazarus =

British model and actress (born 1987)

- Born: 1987 or 1988 (age 38–39); Swansea, Wales
- Education: University of Hertfordshire
- Occupations: Actress; Model
- Beauty pageant titleholder
- Title: Miss Universe UK 2008
- Major competitions: Miss Universe UK 2008 (Winner); Miss Universe 2008 (Unplaced)

Lisa Lazarus (born 1987 or 1988) is a British actress, model and beauty pageant titleholder who was crowned Miss Universe UK 2008 and represented her country at Miss Universe 2008 in Vietnam but unplaced.

== Biography ==
Lazarus was born in Llanelli, Wales. Lazarus attended the University of Hertfordshire where she studied her degree in Diagnostic Radiography.

== Filmography ==
Year	Film	Role	Notes
2008	Miss Universe 2008	Herself	Television
2009	Veer	Lady Angela Fraser	Bollywood Film
2010	Madrasapattinam	Catherine	Tamil Film
