= Amy Guy =

Welsh beauty queen and athlete

- Born: 21 December 1983 (age 42); Wrexham, Wales
- Education: Yale College, Wrexham
- Beauty pageant titleholder
- Title: Miss Wales 2004
- Major competitions: Miss Wales 2004 (Winner); Miss World 2004 (Top 15)

Amy Guy (born 21 December 1983) is a Welsh tv host, athlete and beauty pageant titleholder who was crowned Miss Wales 2004 and represented her country Miss World 2004.

She attended Yale College, Wrexham and secondary school at Ysgol Rhiwabon, Wrexham, Wales, and was the Welsh Schools National 100m and 300m Hurdling Champion. She is an architectural designer and graduated from the University of Nottingham after completing her architecture degree.

She won the Miss Wales pageant in 2004. and the Miss Sport award at Miss World 2004 and automatically advanced as one of the top 15 semi-finalists. As the highest placed of the four contestants from the UK, Guy won the title of Miss United Kingdom and went on to compete as Miss UK at the 2005 Miss International contest. She was in a revived version of Gladiators as a Gladiator Siren.

She has represented Wales on five consecutive occasions horse riding, and was a member of the Great British Team. Guy has aligned with British Show Jumping as an Ambassador for the Sport giving her full support to their delivery of medals for Great Britain campaign through to 2012 and beyond. She currently competes in modern pentathlon, and recent activities have involved marathon running around the world, competing in Asia, America and Europe.

In 2009 she took up polo as an additional sport, and competed in the Asprey World Class Cup day charity match in July 2010 at Hurtwood Park. In 2009 Guy became the female face of Polistas, a clothing and lifestyle brand on the polo circuit, and collaborated with Polistas on a full ladies' range from polo shirts and jeans to dresses, luggage and handbags.

In December 2013, Guy appeared with her husband, Alex on the BBC program Homes Under the Hammer after taking up a new career in property development.
