= Noky Simbani =

English model (born 1997)

- Born: Nokuthaba Simbani; 9 January 1997 (age 29); Zimbabwe
- Education: University of Birmingham
- Occupation: Model
- Height: 5 ft 3 in (1.60 m)
- Beauty pageant titleholder
- Title: Miss Universe Great Britain 2022
- Years active: 2012–present
- Hair color: Brown
- Eye color: Brown
- Major competitions: Miss Grand International 2017 (Unplaced); Miss Universe 2022 (Unplaced)

Nokuthaba Simbani (born 9 January 1997) is a Zimbabwean-British model and beauty pageant titleholder who won Miss Universe Great Britain and represented Great Britain at Miss Universe 2022. She competed in the twentieth series of the ITV reality series Big Brother, where she placed fifth.

== Life and career ==
Nokuthaba Simbani was born on 9 January 1997 in Zimbabwe.

In 2001, she moved to the United Kingdom, settling in Derby, England, where she attended Littleover Community School from 2008 to 2013.

In 2012, aged 15, she participated in the Miss Teen Great Britain competition.

In 2017, Simbani won her first national pageant, Miss Grand England, and went on to represent England in Vietnam.

In 2020, she graduated from the University of Birmingham after studying chemical engineering, she started working as a banker.

In 2022, Simbani competed for the title of Miss Universe Great Britain, which she won.

A year later, she was a housemate on the twentieth series of the British reality series Big Brother, where she was a finalist and was evicted on the final day, receiving 5.3 percent of the votes to win the series, resulting in her placing 5th out the five finalists.

== Filmography ==
As herself
Year	Title	Notes	Ref.
2023	Big Brother	5th place (Contestant)	
2025	Big Brother: Late & Live	Guest; 1 episode	

Awards and achievements
Preceded by Emma Collingridge	Miss Universe Great Britain; 2022	Succeeded by Jessica Page
