= Clair Cooper =

British model and beauty queen

- Born: Clair Cooper
- Height: 1.73 m (5 ft 8 in)
- Beauty pageant titleholder
- Title: Miss Universe Great Britain 2009
- Hair color: Red
- Major competitions: Miss Earth 2007 (Unplaced); Miss Universe Great Britain 2009 (Winner); Miss Universe 2009 (Unplaced)

Clair Cooper is a British model and beauty pageant titleholder who represented England at the Miss Earth 2007 pageant. In early 2009 she was crowned Miss Universe Great Britain 2009 and represented Great Britain at Miss Universe 2009 pageant in The Bahamas on 23 August 2009. Her first major title was Miss London, held at the Hammersmith Palais in May 2006 which was presented by Richard Blackwood and Lucie Hide. This title gave her entry into the Miss England finals the same year.

== Music video ==
In 2011, Cooper starred in the music video, Faded Popstar (directed by Rob Shan Lone).
