= Rosemarie Frankland =

Welsh-American actress, model, and beauty queen

- Born: 1 February 1943; Rhosllannerchrugog, Wrexham, Wales
- Died: 2 December 2000 (aged 57); Marina del Rey, California
- Beauty pageant titleholder
- Title: Miss Wales 1961; Miss United Kingdom 1961; Miss World 1961

Rosemarie Frankland (1 February 1943 – 2 December 2000) was a Welsh-American actress, model and beauty queen who won Miss World 1961, having previously finished as first runner-up at Miss Universe 1961.

== Biography ==
Born in Rhosllannerchrugog, Wrexham, north-east Wales in 1943, Frankland moved to Lancashire, England, as a child. She took part in many beauty pageants and won the title of Miss Wales and, later in 1961 in London, she became (as Miss United Kingdom) the first British woman and the seventh European (Sweden won the two first contests, France won in 1953, Germany three years later, Finland in 1957 and the Netherlands in 1959) to win the Miss World competition. She also was the first runner-up at Miss Universe 1961.

Together with Gina Swainson, who won the Miss World title as Miss Bermuda in 1979, Frankland is one of the two women who came closest to winning both Miss Universe and Miss World, having been second at Miss Universe before winning Miss World. Helen Morgan, who was also Miss Wales and Miss United Kingdom, achieved the same feat, but she resigned the Miss World title four days after being crowned.

When Bob Hope crowned her as Miss World, he commented that she was the most beautiful girl he had ever seen. As part of her tenure as Miss World, she joined Hope at a USO concert in Alaska and reportedly had an affair with the comedian lasting many years, later becoming his personal assistant.

After Miss World, Frankland embarked on a short-lived acting career. Her most substantial (and last) role was in the 1965 film, I'll Take Sweden starring Bob Hope. In 1970, she married the Grass Roots singer/guitarist, Warren Entner and went to live in Los Angeles. In 1976, she gave birth to their only child together, a daughter. The couple divorced in 1981.

=== Death ===
According to reports, Frankland died from a drug overdose in December 2000 in Marina del Rey, California, having had depression. Her ashes were flown back to Wales and were buried at Rhosllannerchrugog Cemetery in February 2001.

== Filmography ==
- The Edgar Wallace Mystery Theatre, We Shall See, (1 episode, 1964) - Waitress
- The Beauty Jungle (1964) - Miss Australia (uncredited)
- A Hard Day's Night (1964) - Brunette Showgirl (uncredited)
- I'll Take Sweden (1965) - Marti (final film role)

Awards and achievements
Preceded by (Argentina) Norma Cappagli	Miss World; 1961	Succeeded by (Netherlands) Catharina Lodders
Preceded by Hilda Fairclough	Miss United Kingdom; 1961	Succeeded by Jackie White
