= Jessica Page =

British model (born 1995)

- Born: 28 October 1995 (age 31); Liverpool, England
- Occupations: Model; entrepreneur; beauty pageant titleholder
- Height: 1.78 m (5 ft 10 in)
- Beauty pageant titleholder
- Title: Miss Universe Great Britain 2023
- Major competitions: Miss Universe Great Britain 2023 (Winner); Miss Universe 2023 (Unplaced); Miss Liverpool 2015 (Runner up)

Jessica Page (born 28 October 1995) is an English model, entrepreneur and beauty pageant titleholder, who was crowned Miss Universe Great Britain 2023 and served as the country's delegate to the Miss Universe 2023 pageant.

== Early life ==
Page was born on 28 October 1995 in Liverpool. Born in Childwall, Liverpool, Jessica is the daughter of Carol Page and Mike Lennon. Jessica is part Māori on her father’s side. Jessica attended St Hilda’s high school from 2007-2014, gaining qualifications in subjects such as business studies, textiles and sociology. She is a business woman and entrepreneur, working with businesses such as Just Eat and Oh My Cheesecake, where she worked with her ex partner. Page previously finished as the first runner-up at Miss Great Britain 2022 and as a top five finalist at Miss Great Britain 2019.

== Pageantry ==
=== Miss Universe 2023 ===
Page was crowned Miss Universe Great Britain in Wales in the summer of 2023 and represented her country at Miss Universe 2023 but Unplaced.

Awards and achievements
Preceded by Noky Simbani	Miss Universe Great Britain; 2023	Succeeded by Christina Chalk
