= Grace Levy =

British beauty pageant titleholder

- Born: London, England
- Beauty pageant titleholder
- Title: Miss Hampshire 2012; Miss Greater London 2013; Miss Universe Great Britain 2014
- Major competitions: Miss England 2012 (Top 10); Miss England 2013 (Miss Eco Award), (Top 5 in Talent); Miss Universe Great Britain 2014 (Winner); Miss Universe 2014 (Unplaced)

Grace Levy is an English beauty pageant titleholder who won Miss Universe Great Britain 2014 and represented the country at Miss Universe 2014.

== Pageantry ==
=== Miss Bristol 2010 ===
Levy was second runner up at Miss Bristol in 2010.

=== Miss Bristol 2011 ===
Levy came second place in Miss Bristol 2011.

=== Miss Universe Great Britain 2011 ===
Levy entered the competition after being awarded direct entry into the final, held at the NEC in Birmingham. Levy was unplaced.

=== Miss England 2012 ===
Levy won Miss Hampshire in 2012. She then competed at Miss England 2012, and reached the top 15.

=== Miss England 2013 ===
Levy won Miss Greater London 2013 and competed at Miss England 2013, and reached the top 15.

=== Miss Universe Great Britain 2014 ===
Levy won Miss Great Britain Universe 2014 representing England on 21 June 2014 in Cardiff, Wales.

=== Miss Universe 2014 ===
Levy competed at Miss Universe 2014 in Miami and was unplaced.

=== Television ===
Levy appeared in series three of Take Me Out.

== Career ==
Levy opened a beauty pageant training School in London called the London School of Pageantry.

Awards and achievements
Preceded by Amy Willerton	Miss Universe Great Britain; 2014	Succeeded by Narissara France
