= Nieve Jennings =

Scottish Model

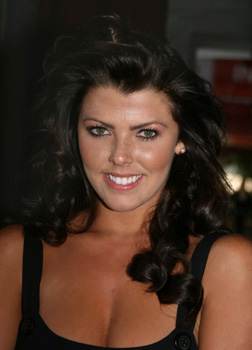
- Born: Nieve Jennings; 3 August 1987 (age 39); Bishopbriggs, Scotland

Nieve King (née Jennings; born 3 August 1987) is a Scottish model and beauty pageant titleholder who was crowned Miss Scotland 2007 and Miss United Kingdom 2007 and also competed in the Miss World 2007 and Miss International 2008 pageants.

== Miss Scotland 2007 ==
At the age of 19, Nieve took part in the Miss Scotland 2007 contest when the event was held in Princes Square, Glasgow. She won the national crown, and other than winning the cash prize of £10,000 and a modelling contract, also gained the right to represent her country at the Miss World 2007 pageant.

== Miss World 2007 ==
Nieve competed as Miss Scotland in the Miss World 2007 pageant held at Sanya, China on 1 December 2007. She had her successes prior to the final competition, when she was placed as 1st runner-up in two fast-track events, specifically Miss World Sports and Miss World Talent. Since she did not win any fast-track event, King was not granted automatic advancement to the semi-final. On the final night, King was placed 16th overall.

== Miss United Kingdom 2007 ==
As the highest placed delegate amongst the four United Kingdom contestants in Miss World 2007, King was awarded the title of Miss United Kingdom 2007 and won the right to represent the United Kingdom at the Miss International 2008 competition.

== Miss International 2008 ==
King competed at the 48th Miss International contest which was held in Macau, China on 8 November 2008.

== Personal life ==
King was born in Rottenrow, Glasgow, and grew up in Bishopbriggs, East Dunbartonshire. She married Stuart King in November 2015 in Loch Lomond. On 6 August 2017 their son was born.
