= Holly Hale =

Welsh beauty pageant titleholder (born 1990)

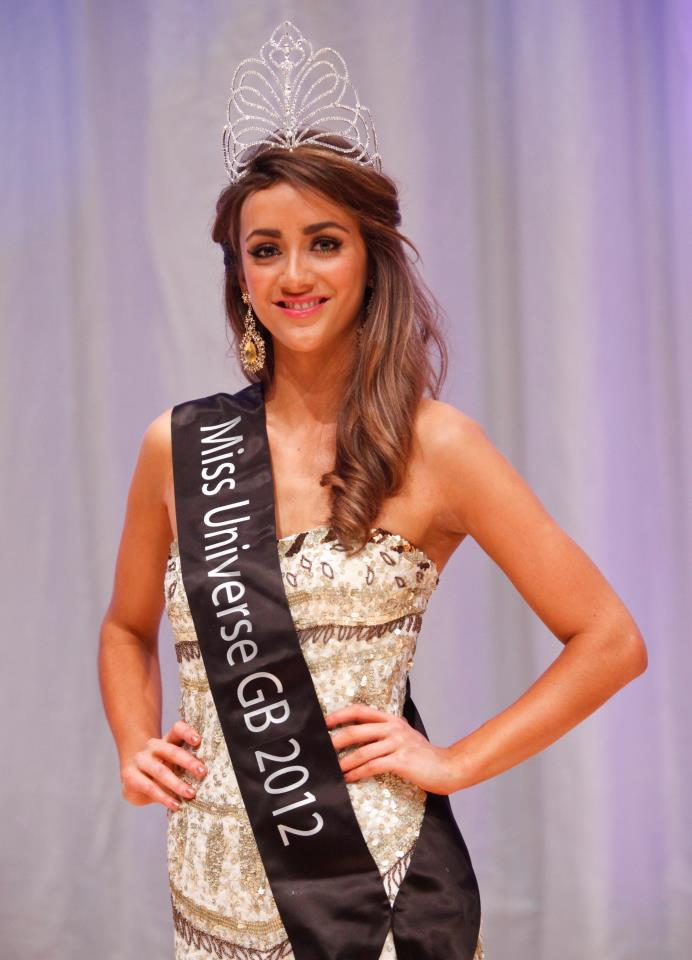
- Hale in 2012
- Born: 1990 (age 35–36); Swansea, Wales
- Beauty pageant titleholder
- Title: Miss Universe Great Britain 2012
- Major competitions: Miss Universe Great Britain 2012 (Winner); Miss Universe 2012 (Unplaced)

Holly Hale (born 1990) is a Welsh beauty pageant titleholder, who won Miss Universe Great Britain 2012.

Hale studied psychology at Cardiff University and was the second consecutive Welsh contestant to win the title. Hale is quoted as saying "Miss Universe is the first pageant I have ever entered and so I cannot believe I’ve won! It is so exciting. I’m really hoping to make everyone proud."

Hale represented Great Britain at Miss Universe 2012.

Awards and achievements
| Preceded by Chloe-Beth Morgan | Miss Universe Great Britain; 2012 | Succeeded by Amy Willerton |
