= Nicola Willoughby =

British model and Miss United Kingdom 1999

- Born: 1981 (age 44–45); Spalding, Lincolnshire, England
- Education: North Lincolnshire College
- Occupations: Model; beauty pageant titleholder
- Children: 4

Nicola Willoughby (born 1981) is a British model and beauty pageant titleholder. She was crowned Miss United Kingdom in 1999.

== Biography ==
Willoughby was born in 1981 in Spalding, Lincolnshire. She attended North Lincolnshire College and during a work placement was entered into a beauty competition in the weekly women's magazine Take a Break. She won the competition, which was a qualifying heat for Miss United Kingdom. Willoughby was crowned Miss United Kingdom 1999 and then competed at Miss World 1999, held in London.

She had emerged as a late favourite to win the Miss World crown, but failed to make the final cut. She narrowly escaped being thrown out of the competition completely after it emerged that she had posed for topless photos, several of which were published in a London tabloid. Ultimately, she was allowed to compete after president of the event, Julia Morley, pronounced her a "lovely person," but her chances of winning had been ruined.

After competing in pageants, Willoughby modelled for national magazines including Elle, FHM and OK! In 2014, Willoughby and Shaunna East founded USN Models in Lincoln, Lincolnshire. She has judged Lincolnshire pageants, such as the Miss Lincolnshire contest in 2021.

As of 2021, Willougby was working as an NHS health care assistant in Lincolnshire and has four children.

| Preceded by Emmalene McLoughlin | Miss United Kingdom; 1999 | Succeeded by Michelle Watson |
