= Veronica Ann Cross =

- Born: 1950 (age 75–76)
- Occupations: Singer; model; beauty pageant titleholder

Veronica Ann Cross (born 1950) is a British singer, model and beauty pageant titleholder. She is daughter of a Covent Garden opera singer, won the Miss United Kingdom beauty pageant in 1973.

At 16 years old, upon leaving school, Cross successfully applied for a job as a photographic model with an agency in London. Soon she was to accept opportunities for television adverts and bit-parts.

In December 1972, she entered a Miss England heat in Streatham, which she failed to win. She tried for another heat in London in February and qualified for the final of the Miss England competition and also qualified her to enter the Miss UK pageant. At the Miss World competition, she managed to come sixth.

== Personal quotes ==
I'd spent a month preparing for that by starving myself. I was 8st 5lbs. When I look at pictures I wince at the sight of the jutting collarbone. I can see I looked too thin, but at the time I was delighted by my protruding bones and concave stomach.

Eating so little wasn't good for my health. For six months my periods packed up completely, a sure sign of starvation.

[Opera singing has] become the love of my life—I don't have deep regrets about not marrying or having children, but I do regret that I never trained as an opera singer like my mother. If I could trade my title for the chance to work as a professional opera singer I'd do it like a shot.

Preceded by Jennifer McAdam	Miss United Kingdom; 1973	Succeeded by Helen Morgan
