= Amy Willerton =

British beauty pageant titleholder and television personality

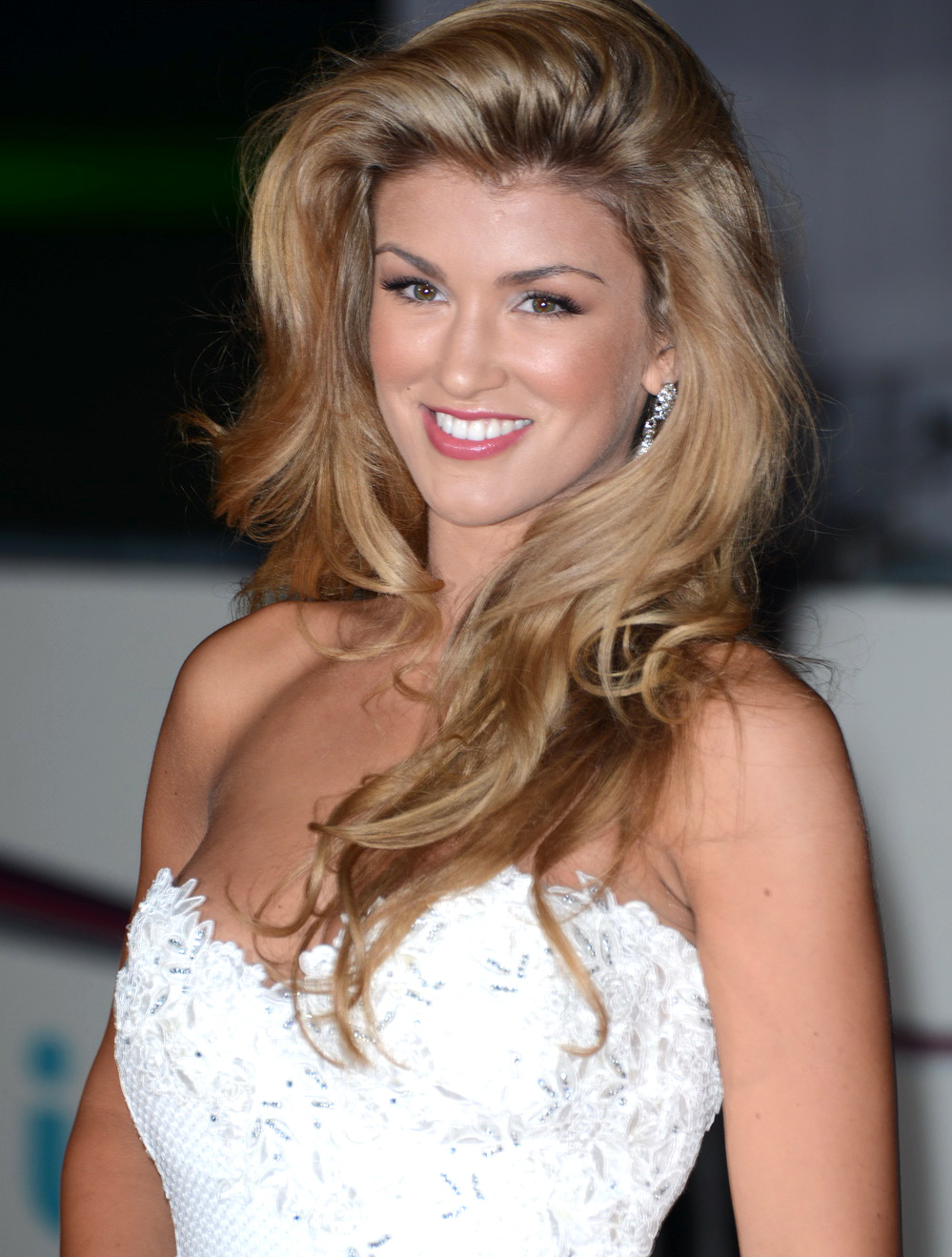
- Willerton in 2013
- Born: 18 August 1992 (age 34); Bristol, England
- Occupations: Television host; model
- Children: 1
- Beauty pageant titleholder
- Title: Miss London 2012; Miss Universe Great Britain 2013
- Major competitions: Miss Universe Great Britain 2013 (Winner); Miss Universe 2013 (Top 10)

Amy Willerton (born 18 August 1992) is an English television host, model and former beauty pageant titleholder. She is known for her work with ITV and winning Miss Universe Great Britain 2013 and representing Great Britain at Miss Universe 2013. Her modelling break was when she was discovered by Katie Price as a teenager. She appeared on the reality TV competition series I'm a Celebrity... Get Me Out of Here! in 2013 and finished in fifth place. In 2015, she was fourteenth in FHM's 100 Sexiest Women. In 2017, she was fourth in Channel 4's The Jump.

== Early life and education ==
Willerton was born in Bristol, England to parents Bruce and Sarah, and has two siblings.

She attended Cotham School before completing her A-levels at North Bristol Post 16 Centre. She was due to study Media at University in Cardiff before deferring to pursue her modelling career.

== Modelling career ==
Willerton began her modelling career at the age of 15 after being spotted by Katie Price. She has since appeared on catwalks around the world for brands such as Karen Millen and Guess (clothing) in advertising campaigns such as being the face of Sure.

== Pageantry ==
=== Miss Bristol 2010, Miss Bath 2011, Miss London 2012 ===
At age 17, Willerton won Miss Bristol. She went on to win Miss Bath in 2011 and Miss London in 2012. At the Miss England contest in 2012, Willerton reached the top five.

=== Miss Asia Pacific World 2011 ===
The events were filmed by Willerton and other contestants (which were later uploaded to YouTube under the title Confessions of a Beauty Queen and spread throughout the pageant industry). Subsequently, she and the representatives from Guyana and Costa Rica fled their hotel to the airport, where the pageant organisers had tried to keep them there against their will and had followed them to the airport to stop them escaping. Organisers denied the accusations.

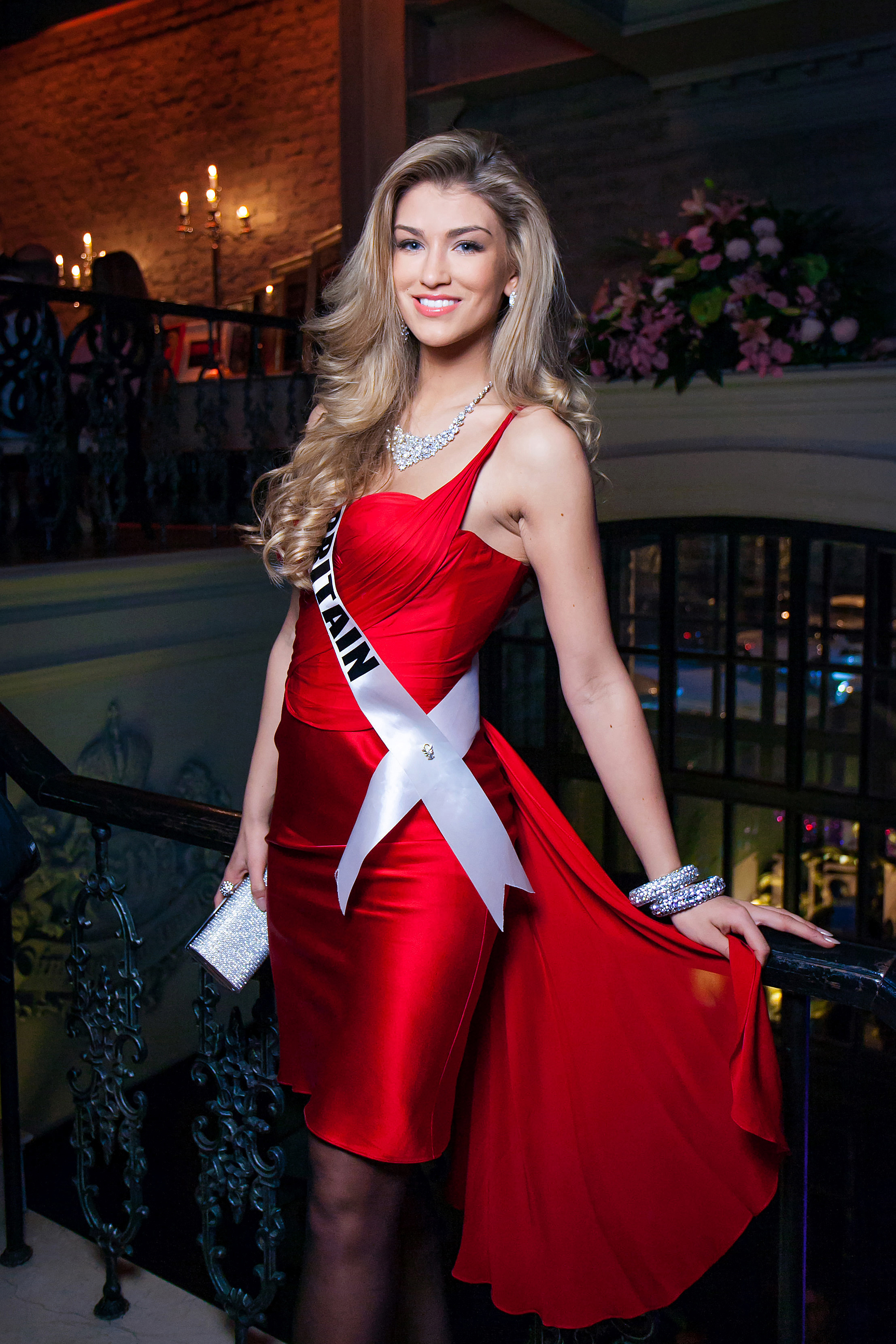
Willerton at Miss Universe 2013 in Moscow

=== Miss Universe 2013 ===
On 8 June 2013, Willerton won Miss Universe Great Britain in Birmingham. On 9 November 2013, Willerton reached the top ten at Miss Universe 2013 in Moscow, Russia.

== Television career ==
Willerton was fifth in ITV's I'm a Celebrity...Get Me Out of Here!.

She has appeared on This Morning, Good Morning Britain, Big Brother's Bit on the Side, The Chase, Mastermind and Lorraine. In 2015, she appeared on Get Your Act Together, which involved her joining and performing with the Moscow State Circus.

Willerton moved to the US in 2016, and began hosting for Fuse TV Network alongside DJ Skee. She then was selected to host the Dance on Network show Every Single Step working with Nigel Lythgoe and Brian Friedman. Willerton was third on The Jump in February 2017.

== Philanthropy and other ventures ==
Willerton's charitable work has focused on helping the disabled. She organised her first event, Bristol Rockstyle for the Variety Club children's charity as a teenager. In 2014 she ran the London Marathon to raise money for The Chickenshed Theatre School.

In 2015, Willerton began writing for the Huffington Post. She was a speaker at the Oxford Union debating society at the University of Oxford.

In the summer of 2016, Willerton sailed across the Atlantic from New York to London as part of the Clipper Round the World Yacht Race.

Awards and achievements
Preceded by Holly Hale	Miss Universe Great Britain; 2013	Succeeded by Grace Levy
