= Emma Jenkins =

Beauty pageant titleholder

- Born: Emma Victoria Jenkins; 1992 or 1993 (age 32–33); Llanelli, Wales
- Height: 1.75 m (5 ft 9 in)
- Beauty pageant titleholder
- Title: Miss Universe Great Britain 2019
- Hair color: Black
- Eye color: Green
- Major competitions: Miss Wales 2015 (Winner); Miss World 2015 (Unplaced); Miss Universe Great Britain 2019 (Winner); Miss Universe 2019 (Unplaced)

Emma Victoria Jenkins (born 1992 or 1993 in Llanelli, Wales) is a Welsh TV host and beauty pageant titleholder who was crowned Miss Universe Great Britain 2019. She represented Great Britain at the Miss Universe 2019 competition.

== Pageantry ==
Emma Jenkins went to compete in Miss Wales 2015 and placed first. As Miss Wales, she represented Wales at Miss World 2015 where she finished unplaced.

Jenkins was a finalist at Miss Universe Great Britain 2017 but decided to withdraw from the competition. On 13 July 2019, she won the Miss Universe Great Britain 2019 competition at the Mercure Holland House in Cardiff, Wales and was crowned by the outgoing titleholder Dee-Ann Kentish-Rogers. She represented Great Britain in the Miss Universe 2019 competition and finished unplaced.

Awards and achievements
Preceded by Dee-Ann Kentish-Rogers	Miss Universe Great Britain; 2019	Succeeded by Jeanette Akua
