= Helen Elizabeth Morgan =

British beauty pageant winner

- Morgan in 1974
- Born: Helen Elizabeth Morgan; 29 September 1952 (age 74); Walsall, England
- Height: 1.73 m (5 ft 8 in)
- Spouse: Ronny Lamb
- Beauty pageant titleholder
- Major competitions: Miss Wales 1974 (Winner); Miss United Kingdom 1974 (Winner); Miss Universe 1974 (1st Runner-Up); Miss World 1974 (Winner; resigned)

Helen Elizabeth Morgan (born 29 September 1952) is a British actress, model, tv host and beauty queen who won the 1974 Miss Wales, Miss United Kingdom and Miss World pageants. Morgan became the first winner to resign, and the second (after Marjorie Wallace) to not complete her one-year reign as Miss World.

== Biography ==
Born in Walsall, Staffordshire, England she worked in a bank. Entering modelling competitions on a part-time basis, she won the Miss Wales (representing Barry in the competition for that title) and Miss United Kingdom titles in 1974.

=== Miss Universe 1974 ===
Morgan represented Wales in the Miss Universe 1974 pageant, where she finished as first runner up.

=== Miss World 1974 ===
Winning Miss United Kingdom earned Morgan the right to represent the United Kingdom in Miss World. She had originally been reluctant to enter the Miss Wales competition, and was eventually paid £30 as a last-minute stand-in when another competitor dropped out. Morgan became the second Welsh woman and the fourth UK representative to win the competition in 1974.

However, she was forced to resign only four days after winning the pageant, upon the media creating extremely negative and lurid headlines as she was an unwed mother with an 18-month-old son. This had never been hidden from the time she was crowned Miss Wales, but the lurid headlines in the hours immediately following her win at Miss World, particularly interviews given by the wife of the child's father, created extreme pressure on Morgan and the Miss World organization. Although this did not violate any of the competition rules (which stipulated only that entrants must be unmarried), pressure was placed on her by the Miss World Organisation that she should resign to save them from further potential embarrassment.

The first runner-up, Anneline Kriel of South Africa, succeeded her. Morgan became the first winner to resign, and the second Miss World titleholder not to finish her reign. The first case was that of Miss World 1973, Marjorie Wallace, who, according to pageant officials, was stripped of the crown for "failing to fulfill the basic requirements of the job" a few months into her reign.

=== After Miss World ===
Threatened with being a named party in a divorce – an action which was later dropped – Morgan was allowed to keep her other titles. She resigned from the bank, and undertook a career in modelling, TV and films.

=== After modelling ===
Morgan married and moved to Surrey in the 1980s, and had two more children, Poppy and Ben. She later left the UK, and now lives in Spain with her husband Ronny Lamb and family.

In 2004, Morgan agreed to judge the 2004 Miss Wales competition in Swansea, the 30th anniversary of her competition win, won by Amy Guy.

Preceded by Deidre Greenland	Miss Wales; 1974	Succeeded by Gina Kerler
Preceded by Veronica Ann Cross	Miss United Kingdom; 1974	Succeeded by Vicki Harris
