= Tara Hoyos-Martínez =

English actress and beauty pageant titleholder (born 1990)

Tara Vaitiére Hoyos-Martinez
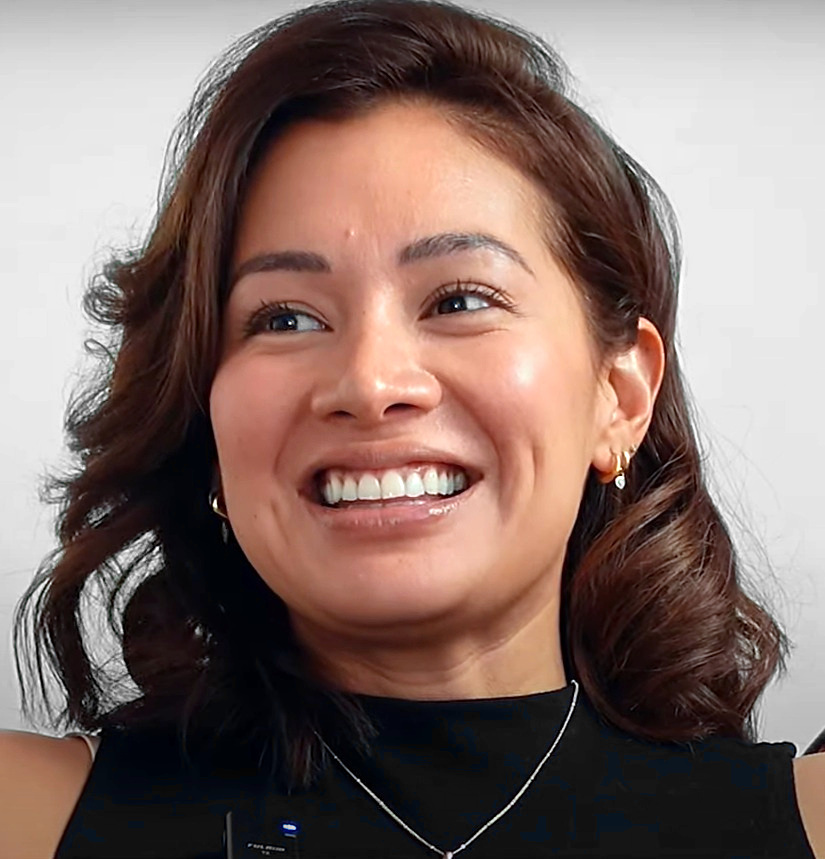
- Hoyos-Martinez in 2025
- Born: Tara Vaitiére Hoyos-Martinez; 28 March 1990 (age 36); London, England
- Other name: Tara Vaitiere Hoyos
- Height: 5 ft 8 in (1.73 m)
- Beauty pageant titleholder
- Title: Miss Universe Great Britain 2010
- Hair color: Brown
- Eye color: Brown
- Major competitions: Miss Universe Great Britain 2010 (Winner); Miss Universe 2010

Tara Vaitiére Hoyos-Martinez (born 28 March 1990) is an English actress and beauty pageant titleholder who, while representing London, was crowned Miss Universe Great Britain 2010. She is of Colombian descent. She then represented Great Britain in the Miss Universe 2010 pageant, held on 23 August 2010 in Las Vegas, United States. She did not place in the competition's Top 15.

Hoyos-Martinez was born to Colombian parents. She graduated from the Manchester Metropolitan University with a degree in Biomedical Science. Tara has alopecia.
