= Nicci Jolly =

British television presenter (born 1981)

- Born: 10 March 1981 (age 45); Dundee, Scotland
- Beauty pageant titleholder
- Title: Miss Scotland 2003
- Major competitions: Miss Scotland 2003 (Winner); Miss World 2003 (Unplaced)

Nicola Jolly is a Scottish TV host and beauty pageant titleholder who won Miss Scotland 2003 and competed in Miss World 2003.

== Biography ==
Jolly has been a presenter for various television shows such as Sky, the BBC, and STV. Though much of her work is sport-related, Jolly has also presented a segment on the Beslan crisis for Richard & Judy, appeared as a guest presenter on This Week, and was a contestant on 'Celebrity Fear Factor. She has been a columnist for the Evening Express.

In addition to her work for television and other media, Jolly is also involved in promoting various charities. She is the face of the Cornerstone Cycle Challenge and has lent her support to a number of other charities, including Streetwork, the SSPCA, and CHAS.

Jolly also participated in the 2005–2006 Clipper Round the World Yacht Race.

Jolly is married to Garreth Wood, who owned the leisure firm Speratus Group and is a son of the billionaire businessman Ian Wood.
