= Juliet-Jane Horne =

Scottish model

Juliet-Jane Horne is a Scottish model and beauty pageant titleholder. She was crowned the 2nd runner-up at the Miss World 2001 competition and earned the title 'Europe's Queen of Beauty'. As the highest-ranked British beauty at this event, Juliet was also awarded the title of Miss United Kingdom.

Awards and achievements
Preceded by (Turkey) Yüksel Ak	Miss World (2nd Runner-Up); 2001	Succeeded by (Peru) Marina Mora
