= Miss Northern Ireland =

Beauty pageant

- Formation: 1980 (For Miss United Kingdom); 2000 (For Miss World)
- Type: Beauty pageant
- Headquarters: Belfast
- Location: Northern Ireland
- Members: Miss World; Miss Europe; Miss Supranational
- Official language: English

Miss Northern Ireland is a national beauty pageant in Northern Ireland, run by Alison Clarke.

== History ==
Before 1999, the winner of Miss Northern Ireland would have to compete in the Miss United Kingdom competition and win it in order to be applicable to compete in the Miss World competition. Since then however, the winner of each nation of the UK sends separate representatives to the Miss World pageant, the highest ranking of the four delegates is then named Miss United Kingdom, and competes at the Miss International Pageant the following year under the "Britain" or "United Kingdom" banner.

== Titleholders ==
Color key

- Declared as Winner
- Ended as runner-up
- Ended as one of the finalists or semifinalists

=== 2000 to Present ===
Since 2000, winners of Miss Northern Ireland have been competing in the Miss World pageant.

Year	Miss Northern Ireland	Represented	Placement at Miss World	Special Awards
2027	TBA	TBA	TBA	
2026	Amelie Moore	Ballyclare	Unplaced	
2026	Carly Wilson	Rathfriland	Withdrew	
2025	Hannah Johns	Belfast	Top 40	
2023	Kaitlyn Clarke	Belfast	Unplaced	
2022	Daria Gapska	Belfast	No international competition held	
2021	Anna Leitch	Lisburn	Top 6	Miss World Europe; 4th Runner-up at Miss World Talent; Top 32 at Miss World Sport
2020	Due to the impact of COVID-19 pandemic, no pageant in 2020			
2019	Lauren Leckey	Stoneyford	Unplaced	Top 32 at Miss World Sport
2018	Katharine Walker	Belfast	Top 30	Top 24 at Miss World Sport
2017	Anna Henry	Belfast	Unplaced	Top 20 at Miss World Talent
2016	Emma Carswell	Gilford	Unplaced	
2015	Leanne McDowell	Cookstown	Top 20	
2014	Rebekah Shirley	Belfast	Unplaced	
2013	Meagan Green	Belfast	Unplaced	
2012	Tiffany Brien	Belfast	Top 30	Top 10 at Miss World Beach Beauty; 1st Runner-up at Miss World Sport
2011	Finola Guinnane	Drumbo	Unplaced	Top 20 at Miss World Beach Beauty
2010	Lori Moore	Belfast	Top 25	Miss World Sport
2009	Cherie Gardiner	Bangor	Unplaced	
2008	Judith Wilson	Enniskillen	Unplaced	Top 19 at Miss World Talent
2007	Melissa Patton	Belfast	Unplaced	
2006	Catherine Jean Milligan	Newtownards	Top 17	Miss World Talent
2005	Lucy Evangelista	Portglenone	Top 15	
2004	Kirsty Anne Gabriel Stewart	Enniskillen	Unplaced	
2003	Diana Sayers	Belfast	Unplaced	
2002	Gayle Williamson	Lurgan	Unplaced	
2001	Angela McCarthy	Belfast	Unplaced	
2000	Julie Lee-Ann Martin	Belfast	Unplaced	

=== 1980 to 1999 ===
Year	Miss Northern Ireland	Represented	Placement at Miss UK
1999	Zöe Salmon	Bangor	
1998	Joanne Salley	Dungannon	1st Runner-Up
1997	Louis-Jayne Brown	Dunmurry	
1996	Fiona Hurley	Belfast	
1995	Shauna Marie Gunn	County Fermanagh	WINNER
1994	Tracey Chambers	Belfast	
1993	Mary McGonagle	Newtownstewart	
1992	Sharon McLaughlin	Limavady	
1991	Eileen Carson	Belfast	
1990	Judith Spratt	Belfast	
1989	Pauline Taylor	Newry	
1988	Barbara Bothwell	Belfast	
1987	Majella Byrne	Belfast	
1986	Karen Duncan	Belfast	
1985	Linda Brotherson	Belfast	
1984	Susan Tan	Coleraine	2nd Runner-Up
1983	Caroline Doherty	Belfast	
1982	Alison Smyth	Belfast	1st Runner-Up
1981	Colette Ramsay	Belfast	
1980	Geraldine McGrory	Belfast	

=== Miss Supranational Northern Ireland ===
- : Declared as Winner
- : Ended as runner-up or top 5/6 qualification
- : Ended as one of the finalists or semifinalists
- : Ended as special awards winner

Year	Miss Supranational Northern Ireland	Placement at Miss Supranational	Special Awards
2023	Did not compete		
2022	Did not compete		
2021	Did not compete		
2020	Due to the impact of COVID-19 pandemic, no pageant in 2020		
2019	Nicholle Hembra	Unplaced	
2018	Did not compete		
2017	Did not compete		
2016	Did not compete		
2015	Lisa Hogan	Unplaced	
2014	Kay Evon Wallis	Unplaced	
2013	Chloe Marsden	Unplaced	
2012	Julie Montague	Unplaced	
2011	Joanna Alexis Spyrou	Unplaced	
2010	Did not compete		
2009	Sarah Marteau	Unplaced	

== See also ==
- Miss Universe Ireland
- Miss Ireland
