= Cultural heritage management =

Vocation and practice of managing cultural heritage

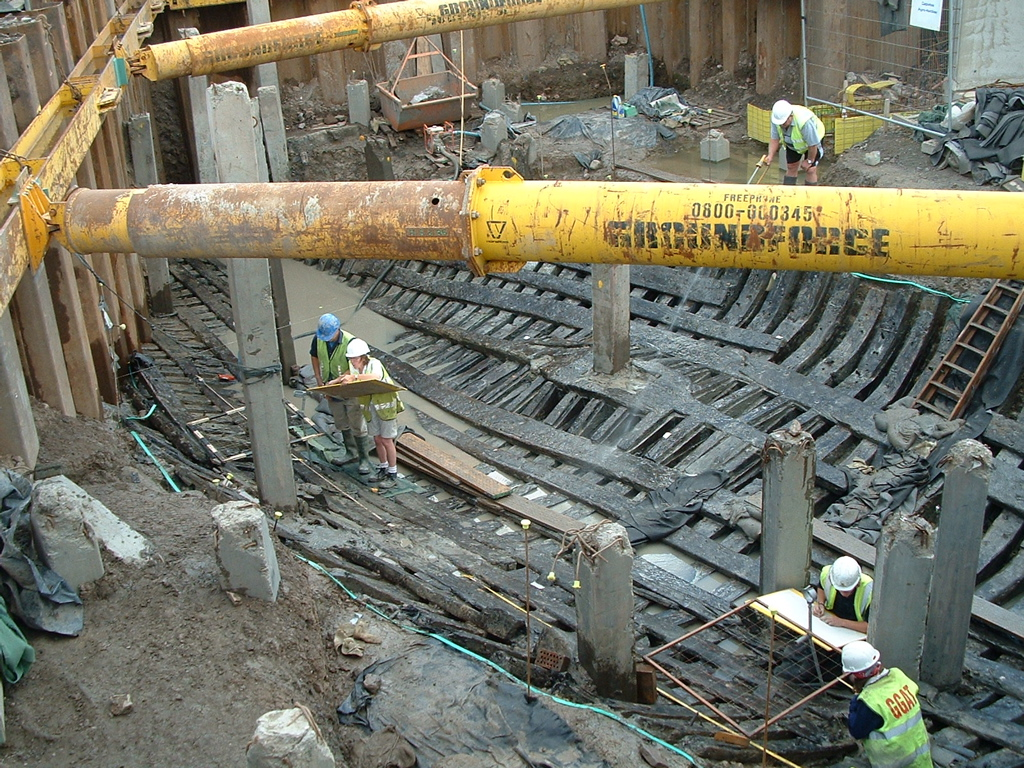
The Newport ship in the foundations of the Riverfront Arts Centre in Newport, Wales, in 2002

Cultural heritage management (CHM) is the vocation and practice of managing cultural heritage. It is a branch of cultural resources management (CRM), although it also draws on the practices of cultural conservation, restoration, museology, archaeology, history and architecture. While the term cultural heritage is generally used in Europe, in the US the term cultural resources is in more general use specifically referring to cultural heritage resources.

CHM has traditionally been concerned with the identification, interpretation, maintenance, and preservation of significant cultural sites and physical heritage assets, although intangible aspects of heritage, such as traditional skills, cultures and languages are also considered. The subject typically receives most attention, and resources, in the face of threat, where the focus is often upon rescue or salvage archaeology. Possible threats include urban development, large-scale agriculture, mining activity, looting, erosion or unsustainable visitor numbers.

The public face of CHM, and a significant source of income to support continued management of heritage, is the interpretation and presentation to the public, where it is an important aspect of tourism. Communicating with government and the public is therefore a key competence.

== Development ==
CHM has its roots in the rescue archaeology and urban archaeology undertaken throughout North America and Europe in the years surrounding World War II and the succeeding decades. Salvage projects were hasty attempts to identify and rescue archaeological remains before they were destroyed to make room for large public-works projects or other construction. In the early days of salvage archaeology, it was nearly unheard-of for a project to be delayed because of the presence of even the most fascinating cultural sites, so it behooved the salvage archaeologists to work as fast as possible. Although many sites were lost, much data was saved for posterity through these salvage efforts.

In more recent decades, legislation has been passed that emphasizes the identification and protection of cultural sites, especially those on public lands. In the United States, the most notable of these laws remains the National Historic Preservation Act. The administration of President Lyndon B. Johnson was most instrumental in passing and developing this legislation, although it has been extended and elaborated upon since. These laws make it a crime to develop any federal lands without conducting a cultural resources survey in order to identify and assess any cultural sites that may be affected. In the United Kingdom, PPG 16 has been instrumental in improving the management of historic sites in the face of development.

The subject has developed from an emphasis on preservation of material culture (by record if not by physical remains), to encompass the broader concepts of culture, which are inseparable from the local communities. Modern thinking takes the view that cultural heritage belongs to the people, therefore access to cultural heritage has to be ensured. The public reaction to the proposed destruction of the Newport ship shows the importance of heritage to local communities.

The legislation of individual nations is often based upon ratification of UNESCO conventions, such as the 1972 World Heritage Convention, the Valletta treaty and the 2001 Convention on the Protection of the Underwater Cultural Heritage. Specific legislation is sometimes needed to ensure the appropriate protection of individual sites recognized as World Heritage Sites.

=== Integrated and New Contextualist Approaches ===
Contemporary shifts in cultural heritage management (CHM) have moved toward "values-based" management, which recognizes that heritage significance is not inherent in the material itself but is constructed by society. A recent development in this discourse is the "New Contextualist" framework, which specifically critiques the "museumification" of heritage sites—a process where archaeological sites are treated as static relics, detached from their living cultural and spiritual contexts.

The New Contextualist approach advocates for a multi-layered management strategy that includes social, economic, ecological, and intangible spiritual dimensions. Rather than focusing solely on physical stabilization, this framework emphasizes the "spiritual aura" and "intellectual intelligence" of a site, proposing that heritage should be managed as a dynamic, living landscape. This model seeks to integrate community participation and ritual continuity into the formal management plan, ensuring that sites like Somapura Mahavihara remain relevant to contemporary stakeholders while supporting sustainable sacred tourism.

== Cultural heritage assessment ==
While archaeological sites remain the primary focus for many CHM professionals, others research historical records or on ethnohistorical projects. Public outreach also falls within their purview. A recent concept is Traditional Cultural Property (TCP). These are places with cultural importance to a group that may not be either particularly historical or an archaeological site. An example would be a location used for contemporary Native American religious events that has no archaeological remains.

A phase of evaluation is considered important in assessing the significance of a possible cultural heritage site. This can comprise a desk-based study, interviews with informants in the community, a wide-area survey, or trial trenching. In North America, survey normally includes either walking ploughed fields in 5–10-metre transects or digging shovel test pits at the same intervals. The soil from the test pits is sifted through 6 mm mesh to look for artifacts. If artifacts are found, the next stage of investigation is usually digging and sifting a spaced grid of test pits (1 m by 1 m trenches) to determine how large or significant the site is.

== Mitigation ==
In the United Kingdom and Canada, all forms of development, public and private, are subject to archaeological requirements, while in the United States this work can only be undertaken in federally funded projects or those on government-owned land, except in a few states that have laws that apply also to private land.

Where archaeological requirements apply to a site of proposed development, if no significant archaeological or other cultural property sites are found in the impacted area, construction may proceed as planned, often with the requirement that archaeologists are on-site providing a watching brief. If potentially significant remains are found, construction may be delayed to allow for evaluation of the site or sites found within the impacted area. This is done to determine the archaeological site's true significance. If archaeologists determine the site contains important/significant cultural remains, the adverse effects on the site must be mitigated. Site mitigation can involve avoiding the site through redesigning the development or excavating only a percentage of the site. In the U.S., these restrictions involve any federal project involving the possible disturbance of cultural resources and can also extend to state and private developments if they involve public waterways or federal funds.

If archaeologists determine the site contains highly significant cultural remains, the adverse development effects on the site must be mitigated through a structured programme that is often long and expensive. Mitigation can include preservation by record i.e. the site is destroyed by archaeological excavation rather than by the development and meticulous recording transfers the physical traces in the earth to information in archives. Mitigation also includes construction techniques which ensure that archaeological remains are protected in undisturbed parts of the site or even underneath the development. An example of this type of mitigation is the Viking remains at York.

Important sites are designated as being protected by the state so that no development at all can take place, and governments also recommend the most important sites to be recognised as World Heritage Sites.

== Effect on archaeology ==
CHM has been a mixed blessing for archaeology. Preservation legislation has ensured that no valuable site will be destroyed by construction without study, but the work of rescue archaeologists is sometimes controversial. Some academic archaeologists do not take archaeological rescue or salvage work seriously because of its emphasis on site identification and preservation rather than intensive study and analysis. Where archaeology is motivated by proposed development, the archaeological contracts are placed through a bidding process. The choice of archaeological contractor typically lies with the developer and there is little incentive to prevent the company responsible for construction selecting the bid with the lowest price estimate, or shortest investigation time, regardless of the archaeological merits of the submitted bids.

The impact of archaeological rescue and salvage work has been considerable; given the large amount of construction, and that the bulk of archaeological work in the United States, Canada and the United Kingdom is developer led. The large number of reports written on the thousands of sites dug each year are not necessarily published in public forums. So-called grey literature is sometimes difficult for even archaeologists outside the developer or the CRM organisation that performed the work to access. Some initiatives, notably the OASIS project of the Archaeological Data Service in the UK, are beginning to make the reports available to everyone.

== Heritage curation and interpretation ==
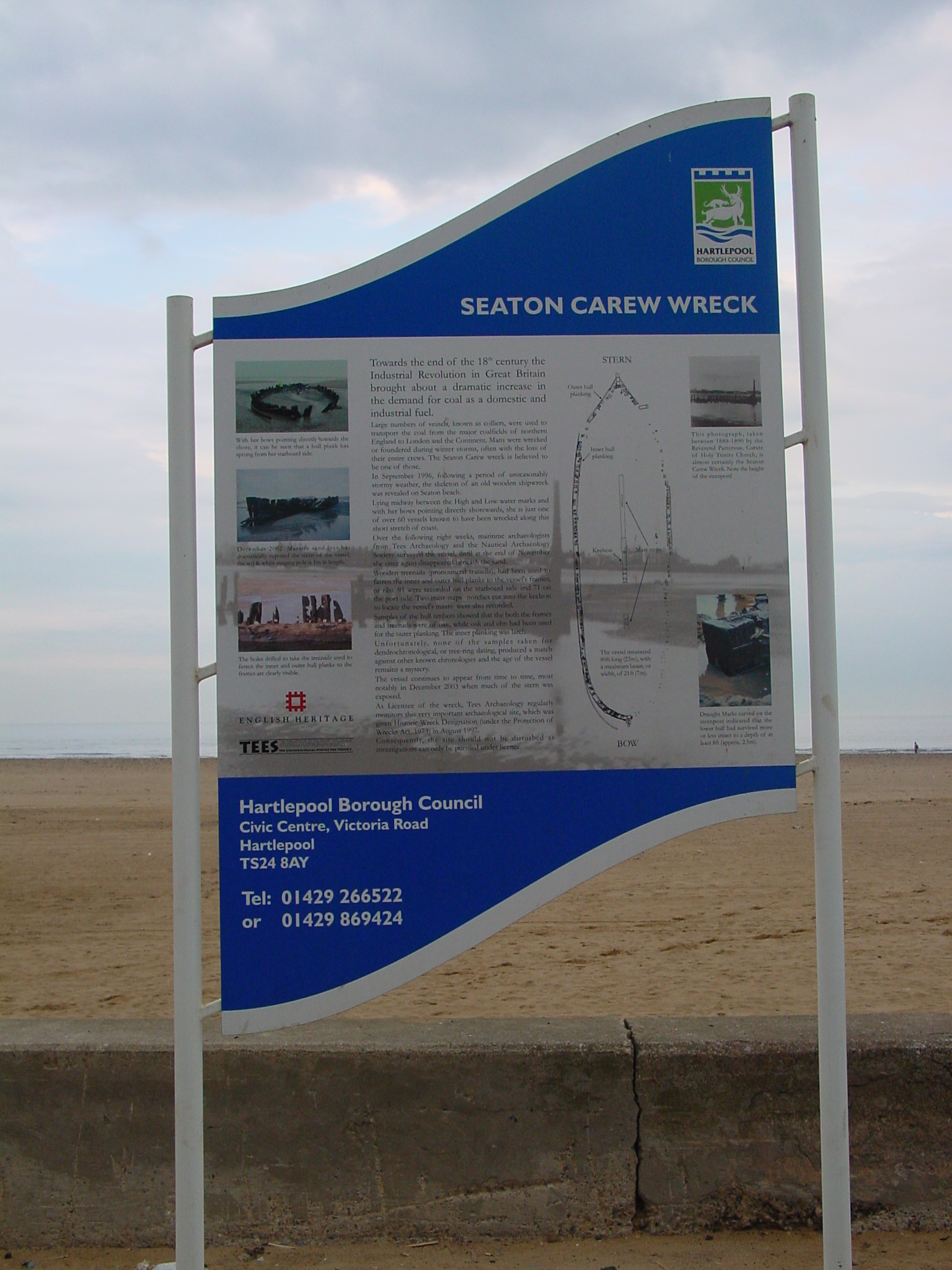
Noticeboard interpreting the protected wreck at Seaton Carew

Curation refers to the long-term preservation and retention of heritage assets and to providing access to them in a variety of forms. Fragile heritage assets may need to be preserved in a special environment, and protected from light (especially ultra-violet), humidity, fluctuations in temperature and in some cases, oxygen from the air. Large museums generally employ specialist conservators as well as education officers, archivists and researchers.

Museums vary in their approach to interpretation ranging from traditional museums that display collections of artefacts behind glass, with labels identifying each item and giving provenance, to living museums which attempt to recreate a historical place or period so that people can experience it.

Within a single museum, a range of approaches may be used including interpretative panels, presenting artefacts in a realistic setting as they would have been experienced, and creating interactive and virtual exhibits. Museums also have processes to loan artefacts to other institutions or exhibitions. Interpretative panels, and other signage, such as Blue plaques in the UK are important in ensuring that cultural heritage is understood in the context of the local community.

== Historic preservation and restoration ==
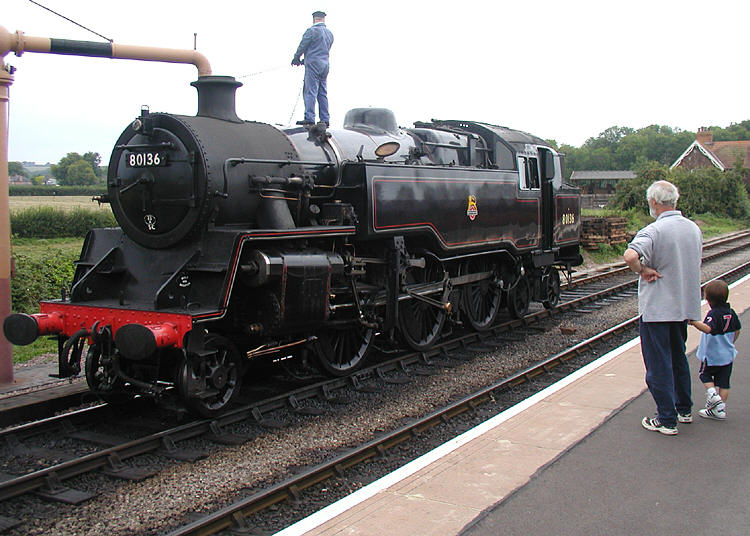
A scene on the West Somerset Railway

Preservation and restoration usually refers to architectural or engineering heritage assets such as heritage buildings or other structures and heritage railways. The UK has a number of different forms of protection for buildings and structures, including listed buildings, conservation areas and scheduled monuments. In France a building or other structure can be protected as a Monument historique. Successful heritage management for a building generally requires that the building continues to be used, as disused buildings are likely to deteriorate quickly. If the purpose for which the building was originally constructed is no longer viable, then other uses, often requiring sympathetic modification must be found.

Heritage machinery, such as antique or vintage cars and heritage railways can best be understood and are best accessed and experienced by the public when they are in an operational condition. Moreover, the heritage skills associated with such heritage assets, such as driving a steam locomotive, can only be maintained if the machinery is used. Restoration to a working, if not pristine condition, and creation of exact working replicas are therefore part of the practice of heritage management.

== Managing intangible cultural heritage ==
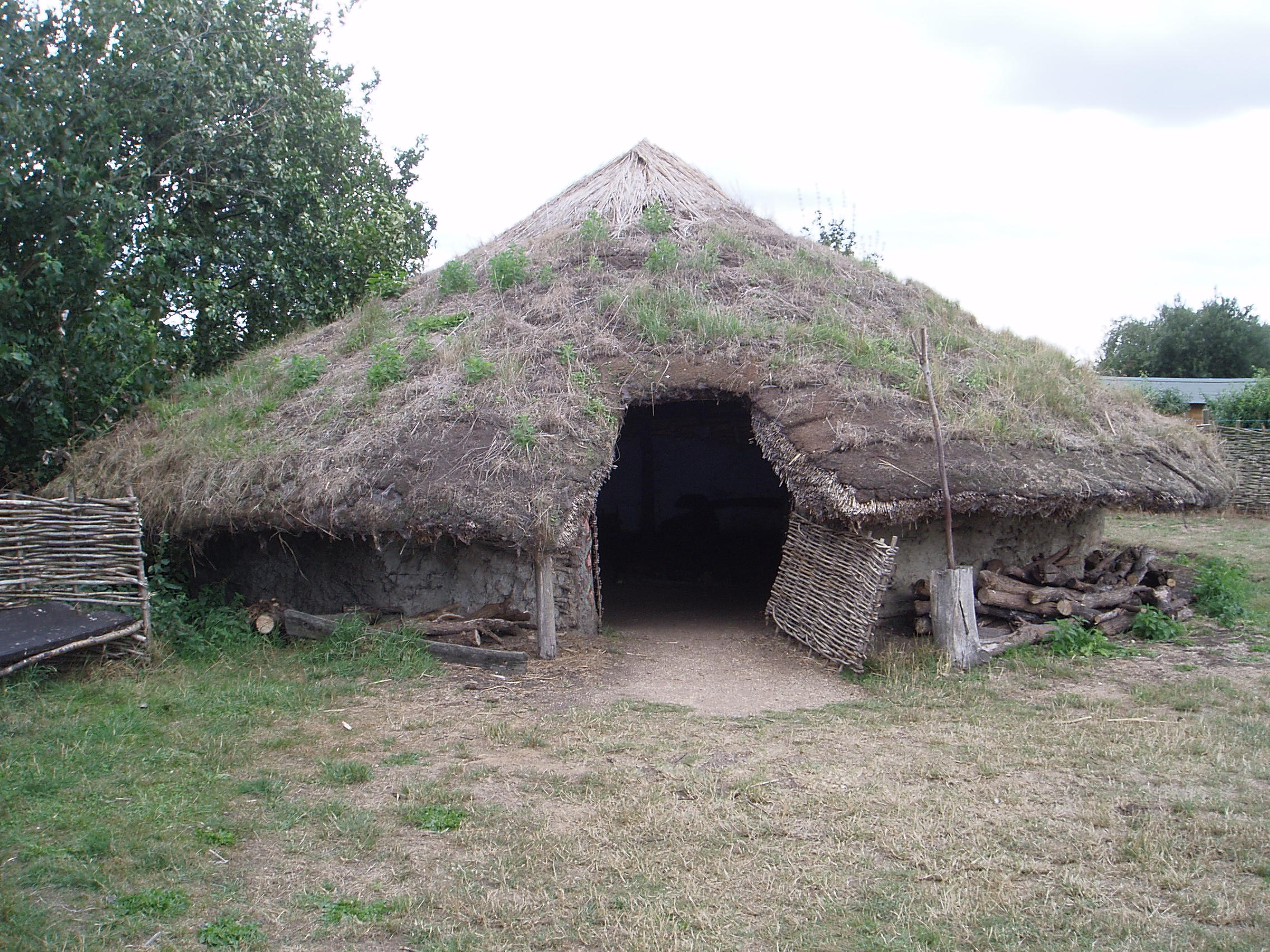
A reconstruction of a Bronze Age dwelling at Flag Fen

The intangible cultural heritage consists of traditional skills, beliefs, traditions, oral traditions, music, songs, dance, drama etc. These cannot be stored in a museum but are constantly reinterpreted by the people in a particular cultural region. The management of intangible cultural heritage is difficult as it requires consideration of the lives and living conditions of local communities. Some countries such as India and the members of the African union have recognised the importance of cultural resources and established government departments to manage them.

== See also ==
- Architectural conservation
- Art conservation and restoration
- Australian archaeology
- Building restoration
- Conservation area
- Cultural heritage
- Cultural landscape
- Cultural resources management
- Europa Nostra
- Valletta Treaty
- Heritage interpretation
- Heritage railways
- Heritage tourism
- Historic preservation
- Listed buildings
- Monument historique
- Museology
- Panjab Digital Library
- Public history
- Rescue archaeology
- Roerich Pact
- Scheduled monument
- Space archaeology
- World Heritage Sites
