= Miss Universe Great Britain 2021 =

- Date: 16 October 2021
- Venue: Riverfront Arts Centre, Newport, Wales, United Kingdom
- Entrants: 29
- Placements: 5
- Winner: Emma Collingridge; Suffolk

Miss Universe Great Britain 2021 was the 13th edition of the Miss Universe Great Britain pageant, held at the Riverfront Arts Centre in Newport, Wales, on 16 October 2021.

Jeanette Akua of London crowned Emma Collingridge of Suffolk as her successor at the end of the event. Collingridge represented Great Britain at Miss Universe 2021 finishing in the Top 16.

== Results ==
=== Placements ===
Placement	Contestant
Miss Universe Great Britain 2021	Suffolk – Emma Collingridge
1st Runner-Up	Stirling – Christina Chalk
2nd Runner-Up	South Lanarkshire – Amy Meisak
Top 5	Derbyshire – Stephanie Hill; East Surrey – Charlotte Kamale

== Official Delegates ==
The 29 finalist for Miss Universe Great Britain 2021 are:

Represents	Candidate	Age	Hometown	Country/Region
Camden, London	Michaela Carew	28	London	England
London	Zakiyah Ahmed	22	London	England
Derbyshire	Stephanie Hill	26	Peak District	England
Dorset	Daniella Hare	20	Bournemouth	England
East Surrey	Charlotte Kamale	27	Surrey	England
East Sussex	Paloma Shemirani	20	Brighton	England
East Yorkshire	Lily Young	22	Yorkshire	England
Edinburgh	Lisa He	24	Edinburgh	Scotland
Essex	Emily Sharland	25	Essex	England
Greater London	Emilee Lucia	26	London	England
Islington, London	Melissa Dewar	24	Farringdon	England
Kent	Ella Baker-Roberts	25	Canterbury	England
Lancashire	Joanna Johnson	28	Blackpool	England
London	Neha Dhull		London	England
Nottinghamshire	Laisha Johnson	27	Nottingham	England
Oxford	Lauri Knowler	26	Oxford	England
Oxfordshire	Roisin Richardson	25	Oxfordshire	England
Perthshire	Abigail Johnston	22	Perthshire	Scotland
South Lanarkshire	Amy Meisak	28	Hamilton	Scotland
South London	Pratishtha Raut	26	Farnborough	England
Stirling	Christina Chalk	28	Dunblane	Scotland
Suffolk	Emma Collingridge	23	Ipswich	England
Sussex	Rosie Minako	27	Sussex	England
Tyne and Wear	Jade Bambrough	27	Sunderland	England
Warwickshire	Eleanor Booth	28	Warwickshire	England
West Midlands	Sacha Jones	26	Birmingham	England
West Surrey	Fallonne Rose	24	Dorking	England
West Yorkshire	Saskia Fauguel		Bradford	England
Worcestershire	Petchara Newson	22	Worcester	England

== Notes ==
=== Death of one of the finalists ===
On 13 April 2021, finalist Saarah Ahmed died at the age of 20 after fighting a rare disease that is a part of the Ehlers–Danlos syndromes.
