= Miss Universe Great Britain 2024 =

- Date: 6 July 2024
- Presenters: Jessica Page; Emma Jenkins
- Venue: Riverfront Arts Centre, Newport, Wales, United Kingdom
- Director: Paula Abbandonato
- Entrants: 43
- Placements: 5
- Withdrawals: 1
- Winner: Christina Chalk; Stirling

Miss Universe Great Britain 2024 was the 16th edition of the Miss Universe Great Britain pageant, held at the Riverfront Arts Centre in Newport, Wales, on 6 July 2024.

This was the first contest that eliminated the upper age limit, allowing all women over the age of 18 to compete, based on the Miss Universe decision.

Jessica Page of Liverpool (Miss Universe Great Britain 2023), crowned Christina Chalk of Stirling as her successor at the end of the event, becoming the first woman from Scotland to win the title. Chalk will represent Great Britain at Miss Universe 2024.

== Results ==
=== Placements ===
Placement	Contestant
Winner	Stirling – Christina Chalk
1st Runner-Up	Lancashire – Eddison Emam
2nd Runner-Up	West Midlands – Evanjelin Francia Elchmanar
Top 5	London – Cara Frew; London – Rehema Muthamia

== Official delegates ==
The 42 finalists for Miss Universe Great Britain 2024:

Represented	Candidate	Age	Hometown	Country/Region
North Yorkshire	Afoluke Adedapo*	31	Middlesbrough	England
East Anglia	Alexa Taylor	33	Norfolk	England
Glasgow	Alexandra Prior*	32	Glasgow	Scotland
London	Allegra Seymour	25	London	England
Oxfordshire	Ana Nacvalovaite*	41	Oxford	England
London	Angel Collins	30	London	England
London	Angel Ojera	34	London	England
London	Annabella Avelina	27	London	England
Buckinghamshire	Antonia Miracle Evans	31	Milton Keynes	England
London	Azqa Sohail	28	London	England
London	Cara Frew	32	London	England
Southend-on-Sea	Caroline Karason*	35	London	England
Berkshire	Charlotte Brooke*	32	Reading	England
Derbyshire	Charlotte Hill*	24	Derby	England
Stirling	Christina Chalk*	30	Dunblane	Scotland
Kent	Christina White	39	Sevenoaks	England
Lancashire	Eddison Emam*	21	Lancashire	England
Surrey	Elene Wagstaff*	30	Reigate	England
Kent	Ella Baker Roberts*	28	Canterbury	England
London	Elma Daku	27	London	England
West Midlands	Evanjelin Francia Elchmanar*	23	Birmingham	England
London	Fatima Benkhaled	29	London	England
Nottinghamshire	Francesca Ziérre	25	Nottingham	England
West Midlands	Haleema T. Ali	24	Birmingham	England
Greater Manchester	Hannah Alassiri*	30	Manchester	England
Surrey	Helina Hewlett*	33	Woking	England
Kingston-Upon-Hull	Leen Clive*	32	Hull	England
Worcestershire	Leigh Hutchinson	36	Worcester	England
Thurrock	Mariam Bakre	29	Grays	England
Merseyside	Megan Vincetta Robinson*	32	Liverpool	England
London	Melissa Dewar*	26	London	England
Greater London	Nicoll Moss*	52	Orpington	England
Warwickshire	Ophelia Charles	29	Nuneaton	England
Hertfordshire	Paige Ashton*	29	Watford	England
London	Rehema Muthamia*	28	London	England
London	Samara Telesford*	26	London	England
Kent	Serena John	18	Kent	England
Oxfordshire	Sharon Gaffka*	28	Oxford	England
London	Tamyka Jones	28	London	England
Essex	Wenna Rumnah	21	Chigwell	England
Chepstow	Zoe Scrimshaw*	26	Chepstow	Wales
London	Zuleyka Strasner	38	London	England

== Notes ==
Christina Chalk competed at Miss Universe Philippines 2024, and entered late into Miss Universe Great Britain. At the finals there were two contestants representing Scotland in the competition, Chalk and Alexandra Prior.

Most of the contestants that competed at Miss Universe Great Britain 2024 were former Miss World, Miss Earth, Miss England, Miss Great Britain and Miss International winners, finalists and participants of other notable, national and international pageant systems:

Afoluke Adedapo was Miss Middlesbrough 2022 and represented Middlesbrough at Miss Great Britain 2022.

Ana Nacvalovaite was Mrs Great Britain 2023.

Caroline Karason was a finalist at Miss Great Britain 2023.

Charlotte Brooke was Miss Earth England 2017 and represented England at Miss Earth.

Charlotte Hill was former Miss Derbyshire 2018.

Eddison Emam was Miss Great Britain teen.

Elene Wagstaff was Miss Philippines UK 2014.

Ella Baker Roberts competed at Miss Kent 2019 and was crowned Miss Publicity Great Britain.

Evanjelin Francia Elchmanar was Miss International United Kingdom (Miss United Kingdom) 2021/2022 and represented the UK at Miss International 2022.

Hannah Alassiri was Miss British Isles (Swimsuit) 2023/2024. (See history of Miss Universe Great Britain).

Helina Hewlett was Miss British Virgin Islands 2017 and represented the British Virgin Islands at Miss World 2018.

Leen Clive was Mrs UK World 2022.

Megan Vincetta Robinson competed at Miss Universe Great Britain 2017.

Melissa Dewar competed at Miss England 2022.

Nicoll Moss was Miss Great Britain Classic 2022.

Paige Ashton was a finalist for Miss England 2021.

Rehema Muthamia was Miss England 2021 and represented England at Miss World.

Samara Telesford was Miss Caribbean UK 2023.

Sharon Gaffka was Miss International United Kingdom (Miss United Kingdom) 2018.

Zoe Scrimshaw was Miss Monmouthshire 2017 and 1st Runner Up Miss Wales 2022 and 2023 for Miss Wales 2023
