= Nepalis in Hong Kong =

People of Nepali origin settled in Hong Kong

Nepalis in Hong Kong 在港尼泊爾人
Total population
- approximately 29000

Regions with significant populations
- Yau Tsim Mong, Yuen Long

Languages
- Nepali, English and Cantonese

Religion
- Hinduism

Related ethnic groups
- Nepali people

There is a moderately medium sized ethnic minority population of Nepalese people in Hong Kong (referred to as 'Hong Kong Nepalese'), forming roughly 4% of the total ethnic minorities population (approximately 29000 (According to census of 2016 - total 18094, but many others have already received British and Chinese citizenship which counts approximately around 10000)). They primarily came to this territory as part of the Gurkha brigade of the British Army in 1960s. After the handover in 1997, their (Gurkha Soldiers') siblings were granted rights of abode in Hong Kong. Hence, the majority of the Nepali population of Hong Kong are the children and grandchildren of Gurkha soldiers.

Nepalese are not totally invisible in society; they are visible in media discourse as well as the government policies. Also, they are relatively organized, having established their own NGOs to fight for their rights. The Nepalese are one of the fastest-growing ethnic minorities in Hong Kong.

== Background and social history ==
Nepalese people began arriving in Hong Kong under British colonial rule in the 1960s as part of the British Army's Brigade of Gurkhas. They continued in this employment until 1997. Their primary duties were to deter illegal immigrants and protect local residents. Most of them lived in Whitfield Barracks and Shek Kong Barracks.

After 30 June 1997, the British Government withdrew from Hong Kong, and the Gurkha brigade disbanded. These Gurkhas and their children had the right to reside in Hong Kong. Also in 2008, a law of the UK was passed which claimed that those Gurkhas retired before 1997 would be eligible to live in United Kingdom as citizens.

Nepalese who choose to stay in Hong Kong want to take root there, especially if their children were born there. They have Hong Kong Identity Cards, but their nationality is still Nepalese. Without Chinese nationality, they are ineligible to apply for an SAR passport or a ‘home return permit’ . However, since July 2024, they have been able to apply for and receive the Mainland Travel Permit for Hong Kong and Macao Resident (Non-Chinese Citizens).

There are over 40 NGOs organized by Nepalese in Hong Kong, and these social organizations have government licenses. The Southern League Organization and Hong Kong Nepalese Federation Some of the NGOs are formed by different lineages; they provide services and share relevant news happening in Hong Kong or Nepal to different lineages, such as the lineage of Limbu, Rai, Gurung, Magar, etc.

== Life in Hong Kong ==
=== Occupations ===
More than 80% of Nepalese are employed in elementary occupations.

=== Community and housing ===
The Nepalese in Hong Kong mainly live in the Yau Tsim Mong area (33.2% of Hong Kong's Nepali population, and 2.4% of the district's population being Nepali) and the Yuen Long area (33.9%; 0.8%). As Kowloon Park was a main military camp for the brigade from Nepal, as well as Shek Kong in Yuen Long, they chose to live nearby after they left the camp. Some of them live in Wan Chai where they first arrived; in fact, their communities have spread out to more districts nowadays.

Nepalese mainly live in tenement houses. As they would prefer staying together, they would divide a flat into rooms. They rarely choose public housing because they would be dispersed across different districts. Another reason is that the time for public housing applications is too long, even if they can succeed, and they would be assigned to remote areas. Thus, public housing is not their preference for housing.

=== Languages ===
The Nepalese speak different languages according to their ethnicities, which are divided by different lineages; they learn their own languages before they speak Nepali. Apart from their national languages, they speak English and Cantonese less fluently. Although the older generation was born in Hong Kong, their proficiency in Cantonese remains poor. Some would attribute the problem to the prohibition of learning or communicating with locals in the military camp. Restriction of learning Cantonese was a measure of the British to stabilize the military force.

=== Media ===
In Hong Kong, there was few newspapers in the Nepali language. Everest Media Limited has published Everest Weekly since May 1, 2000, Sunrise Group published Sunrise Weekly from 2005, and Great Perfect Limited published Ethnic Voice Weekly (bilingual) since May 1, 2011. It carries both Hong Kong and Nepal news. It focuses local Nepalese activities. But now Sunrise Weekly & Ethnic Voice have already stopped publishing, while Everest Publishing is publishing irregularly.

== Education ==
=== Applying for school ===
In the school year of 2009/10, the Hong Kong Government has selected 17 primary schools and 9 secondary schools located in different main areas of Hong Kong that are designated for receiving intensive on-site support to enhance the learning and teaching of non-Chinese students. However, most Nepalese parents encounter difficulties in applying for school places since they cannot get access to official information. Instead, Nepalese parents often search for information within their own community.

As there is no special arrangement for Nepalese students in the school allocation system, their choice is limited to those mentioned schools for non-Chinese students. The mother tongue teaching policy for native-level Cantonese speakers was implemented in 1998. At that time, the policy dramatically reduced the number of English medium of instruction (EMI) secondary schools. The rest of the EMI schools are either highly competitive or relatively expensive. Thus, lower-level schools are often the choices left for Nepalese children. Other than studying in Hong Kong, some Nepalese parents would send their children to receive cheaper education in Nepal until university graduation.

After Nepalese students graduate from secondary school, their choices of enrolling in local tertiary education are limited, since most of the tertiary institutions and programs require passing the Advanced Level (matriculation) or the Advanced Supplementary (AS) Chinese Language and Culture examination. The Chinese Language in General Certificate of Secondary Education Examinations (GCSE) that they mainly take is always not accepted, as the examination does not meet the basic standards of those tertiary institutions. It is extremely hard for Nepalese to enroll in local tertiary education.

=== School life and assistance ===
Although the Hong Kong Education and Manpower Bureau has developed specialized teaching materials for ethnic minorities for the past 10 years, students still find it difficult to learn Chinese. As this is a second language to them, students would have poorer engagement and achievements in learning . Meanwhile, the Education Bureau does not seem to have modified the teaching materials according to their learning abilities and needs, the materials adopted are often lack of experts’ support and teachers’ trainings .

Nepalese students can enjoy similar welfare to locals. They can apply for financial assistance in education, like School Textbook Assistance and Student Travel Subsidy Schemes, though the relevant information may not be sufficient for all Nepalese. In terms of language education, there are no special Chinese language classes provided by the school unless they fail in the exams. Instead, some NGOs organize Chinese language and adaptation classes to assist them while the Home Affairs Department offers short-term tutorials to them. Hong Kong Integrated Nepalese Society Limited, a non-profit charitable organization known as HINS, operated the Home Affairs Department's Nepalese Community Support Team project from 2006 to 2016. Under this project, HINS provides Cantonese tutorial classes for Nepalese primary-level students. Even though after 2016 HINS has no more projects, this organization still helps the Nepalese community through various classes and training, which help Nepalese to integrate into the local community. ( www.hinslimited.org )

=== Qualifications ===
As the GCSE Examination in Chinese is not broadly accepted in Hong Kong society for its perceived low standard, the Nepalese graduates are often not qualified for jobs like civil servant jobs or disciplined services. The requirements on the Chinese certificates and proficiency of written Chinese are often significant barriers for them, even though some of them could speak and listen to Cantonese very well. On the other hand, those academic qualifications granted in Nepal are also not accepted by employers. Thus, with no guarantee and support on their academic qualifications, they can hardly enter any professions.

== Public visibility ==
=== Media discourse ===
In January 2009, a homeless Nepalese (named Limbu Dil Bahadur) was shot dead by a policeman. The policeman arrived to deal with a nuisance complaint about the man, who had been sleeping rough on a hillside in To Kwa Wan. Claiming that he was attacked, the policeman fired two shots, and the Nepalese was dead. After that, some media conjectured that the incident was caused by a language problem. However, two days later, the media found that the Nepalese was born in Hong Kong and he could speak Cantonese. Mainstream media based on the 2-3 minute video clip and reported this news to a discussion about "illegal snake being damaging to social security" and claimed that they were in Hong Kong to "seek cash". Other newspapers even had a headline "courageous police officer shot dead a hillside villain". Nevertheless, some media such as Ming Pao and Economic Daily quoted from a hiker who said that he never perceived the homeless as dangerous to others. Subsequently, the courts ruled that the man was lawfully killed.

The mainstream media tend to stereotype the Nepalese in Hong Kong as "lazy vagrants." The media tend to depict the negative side of them, with relatively fewer reports on their contributions to Hong Kong society.

=== Government policies ===
There were no local policies protecting the rights of Nepalese until 2008. In July 2008, an anti-discrimination law, the Race Discrimination Ordinance (RDO) was enacted, and it came into operation on 10 July 2009. From the RDO, " it is unlawful to discriminate, harass or vilify a person on the ground of his/her race". Yet there have been a number of criticisms of the ordinance, for instance, only the part ‘Discrimination and Harassment in Employment Field’ has been implemented so far. Also, the direct involvement of ethnic minorities in legislation was relatively low, due to insufficient promotion of the Bill during its consultation period.

=== Discourse of the group ===
Though they are not always recognized as "Hong Kongers", the Nepalese are still eager to contribute to Hong Kong society. In fact, they would like to be hired as police officers or firefighters, though their not understanding the local language may, justifiably, limit their opportunities. (On the other hand, those who have proficiency in languages such as Nepali in addition to Chinese and English will be prioritised for recruitment by the police.) Nepalese are relatively organized compared to other minority groups in Hong Kong. Gurkha Security Services Limited launched various kinds of talks and workshops on workers’ policies. Besides, the Nepalese in Hong Kong did have several times of demonstrations due to different kinds of issues, for example the demand of democracy in their country, and demand an apology for the fatal shooting by a police officer of a Nepalese man, as mentioned above.

== Societal difficulties ==
Naturally, one living in a place but not knowing the local language encounters difficulty for himself/herself and others in daily life. According to the RDO, people treated differently because of language barriers are not classified as being discriminated.

Some Nepalese in Hong Kong are facing difficulties because of their culture is different from the local Chinese. For instance, the police check their HKID cards usually simply due to a misunderstanding of language and cultural differences. This would cause discomfort and inconvenience to the Nepalese.

In order to improve the situation, the Hong Kong government provides a new set of guidelines for the police who garrison in Yau Tsim Mong district. Tips on speaking Nepalese and brief introduction to minority cultures are provided, in order to ease their communication and reduce the appearance of direct discrimination.

In terms of career, the Labour Department is one of the important sources for finding jobs. However, its recruitment notices are posted mostly in Chinese, therefore it is difficult for those Nepalese who do not understand Chinese well enough to identify a suitable job. Besides, most of the job training courses are offered in Cantonese, such as the construction training programs. In this regard, Punarjiwan Society is committed to building an independent Nepali body to help the Nepali community in its crusade against drug abuse and other negative issues. It is a self-supporting Organization dedicated to improving the lot of Local Hong Kong Nepalis.

Moreover, the salary of Nepalese workers in Hong Kong is usually lower than that of local workers, even if they work longer hours. More than 46% of Nepalese construction workers whose earning is less than $12,000 a month but more than 60% of them work for 60 hours per week. Nepalese workers earn $100 less than the locals in average per day. The situation of female workers is even worse. Also, many of them are hired on a daily basis rather than on a monthly basis. This results in them having less stable jobs than the locals. Nonetheless, many of them would continue to work for their companies because they cannot afford to risk losing the income .

In terms of public services, although the public hospitals provide services in English or Chinese to non-local patients, Nepalese sometimes find difficulties communicating with their doctors, even when they perceive a different treatment from the locals. Translation is often needed, particularly in medical services and education.

== Notable individuals ==
- Balram Chainrai, businessman
- Sher Lama, cricketer
- Sneha Limbu, footballer
- Pratishtha Raut, model
