= Christina Chalk =

British-Filipino beauty pageant titleholder

- Born: Christina dela Cruz Chalk; Dunblane, Stirling, Scotland
- Alma mater: University of Glasgow
- Height: 1.73 m (5 ft 8 in)
- Beauty pageant titleholder
- Title: Miss Universe Great Britain 2024
- Major competitions: Miss Universe Great Britain 2016; (1st Runner-up); Miss Universe Great Britain 2019; (Top 15); Miss Universe Great Britain 2021; (1st Runner-up); Miss Universe Philippines 2024; (Top 20); Miss Universe Great Britain 2024; (Winner); Miss Universe 2024; (Unplaced)

Christina dela Cruz Chalk is a British-Filipino beauty pageant titleholder who was crowned Miss Universe Great Britain 2024. She represented her country at Miss Universe 2024 in Mexico.

Chalk previously competed at Miss Universe Philippines 2024 where she reached the top 20. She had also entered Miss Universe Great Britain three times before winning on her fourth attempt in July 2024.

== Early life and education ==
Christina Dela Cruz Chalk grew up in Dunblane, Scotland; her mother is Filipina and her father Scottish. She attended Dunblane High School and graduated with a degree in pharmacology from the University of Glasgow.

Chalk began modelling at the age of 15, and was called Scotland's New Face in 2009 at the Scottish Fashion Awards. She has also modelled for Swarovski and Vogue. In 2013, Chalk appeared on the reality TV show Britain & Ireland's Next Top Model series 9 and was the first to be eliminated, finish in 14th place. After the show, Chalk moved to the Philippines in several years to pursue her modeling career while travel back and forth to her hometown Dunblane.

== Pageantry ==
=== Miss Scotland 2015 ===
Chalk was the first runner-up at Miss Scotland 2015. She was an advocate for multiple sclerosis and the Multiple Sclerosis Society of Great Britain.

=== Miss Universe Philippines 2024 ===
On 18 February 2024, the Miss Universe Philippines organisation announced that Chalk would be one of the 54 candidates competing at Miss Universe Philippines 2024. Chalk represented the Filipino overseas community of the United Kingdom. On 22 May 2024, Chalk finished in the top 20, with Chelsea Manalo of Bulacan as the winner.

=== Miss Universe Great Britain 2024 ===
On 6 July 2024, Chalk won Miss Universe Great Britain, which made her eligible to compete at Miss Universe 2024. Chalk had previously competed in 2016 (first runner-up), 2019 (top 15), 2021 (first runner-up) at Miss Universe Great Britain.

=== Miss Universe 2024 ===
Chalk represented Great Britain at Miss Universe 2024 in Mexico but was unplaced.

Awards and achievements
Preceded by Jessica Page	Miss Universe Great Britain; 2024	Succeeded by Danielle Latimer
