= Site museum =

Archaeological museum located at or near a site

A site museum, located on or directly adjacent to an archaeological site, is "a museum conceived and set up in order to protect natural or cultural property, movable and immovable, on its original site". Distinct from related concepts, such as outdoor or open-air museums, historic houses, and heritage parks, site museums focus primarily on in situ preservation.

A site museum is, therefore, one where:

- A physical structure or feature is primarily preserved in situ.
- The site is of particular historical or natural significance, and that significance is presented in a curated fashion to visitors.
- The site is contextualized within the "complete environment of the place" such that its significance is co-determined with the surrounding context.

== History ==
The first use of the term 'site museum' resulted from a mistranslation of the American expression 'trail-side museum' into French as le musée de site and then back into English as 'site museum' (the literal English translation of the French term). The first site museums, as rigorously defined, were in the Mediterranean and the Near East, building off the older concept of the open-air museum. One example, the Delphi museum, opened in 1903 next to the archaeological site, which was also preserved with constructed visitor pathways designed to minimize the effect of foot traffic. The establishment of more site museums increased with the rise of cultural tourism and state-led heritage programs in the mid-20th century, as well as the growing movement in curation to contextualize and democratize heritage.

== Function and purposes ==
=== Interpretation and education ===
Site museums serve a primary function of education and interpretation, utilizing tools such as reconstruction, signage, digital media, and guided tours to engage visitors. By maintaining the complete environment of the place, these institutions allow for a variety of approaches to presenting sensitive sites or objects, providing broader historical and environmental contexts.

=== Tourism and economic development ===
The establishment of site museums is often linked to state-led heritage programs and the expansion of cultural tourism. They play a crucial role in local and national tourism economies. To accommodate economic interests, site museums develop infrastructure for visitor management, such as safe visitor pathways and fences to prevent individuals from straying off paths. These fences and pathways also help minimize the effects of foot traffic on the archaeological material itself.

=== Community engagement ===
An important topic in the dialogue surrounding site museums, and even museums in general, is that of ownership and representation. Who interprets or preserves the site, and for whom? Modern curatorial practices in site museums have shifted toward community-based and conservation-focused models. One example of this approach is the Maya archaeological site of Copán in Honduras, where the townspeople hold a vital role in the site's preservation and economy. For example, local residents were instrumental in the construction of the Sculpture Museum of Copán.

Additionally, one of the key issues that troubles museums is their colonial legacies. Community engagement can help address such legacies and counter extractive narratives that persist in early practices of cultural heritage management.

== Types of site museums ==
Site museums vary in form. Two factors that may be taken into consideration here are: 1) their relationship to the surrounding environment, and 2) the scale of preservation. Open-air site museums, such as Pompeii, preserve ruins in their original outdoor context (note: this is distinct from relocated open-air museums). There are also architectural site museums, where protective buildings are constructed directly around excavated structures. Landscape-integrated museums like Mesa Verde National Park present archaeological remains as part of a broader cultural-ecological landscape. On a smaller scale, in situ displays preserve specific features, such as mosaics, burials, or rock art panels at sites like the Cave of El Castillo and Lascaux, in their original place of discovery for public viewing.

== Examples ==
=== Africa ===
- Valley of the Kings
- Giza pyramid complex
- Malapa Fossil Site, Cradle of Humankind

=== Americas ===
- Mesa Verde National Park
- Teotihuacan
- Copán

=== Asia ===
- Mohenjo-daro
- Terracotta Army

=== Europe ===
- Pompeii
- Çatalhöyük

=== Oceania ===
- Rapa nui
- Lapita culture sites with local interpretive centers

== See also ==
- Open-air museum
- Interpretation centre
- World Heritage Site
