= Miss Universe Great Britain 2020 =

- Date: 8 March 2021
- Venue: London
- Entrants: 38
- Placements: 20
- Winner: Jeanette Akua; Central London

Miss Universe Great Britain 2020 was the 12th Miss Universe Great Britain pageant. It was held in London on 8 March 2021. Originally scheduled for 11 July 2020, but due to the COVID-19 pandemic, this was rescheduled to 19 December 2020 and delayed once again hours before the event was to start due to the new strain of virus detected in Southeast England, this was out from the schedule for the second time.

Jeanette Akua was virtually crowned Miss Great Britain 2020 by Emma Jenkins of Wales as her successor at the end of the event. Akua represented Great Britain at the Miss Universe 2020 pageant, and placed into the top twenty-one.

== Results ==
=== Placements ===
Placement	Contestant
Miss Universe Great Britain 2020	Central London – Jeanette Akua
1st Runner-Up	Mid Glamorgan – Sophie Moulds
2nd Runner-Up	Glasgow – Amy Meisak

== Official Delegates ==
Represents	Candidate	Age	Height	Hometown	Country/Region
Buckinghamshire	Serena Marija	27		Buckinghamshire	England
Capital City	Hazra Daudo	22	1.72 m (5 ft 8 in)	London	England
Cardiff	Kelly Tamplin	27		Cardiff	Wales
Central London	Jeanette Akua	27		London	England
City of London	Zakiah Ahmed	21		London	England
(London) City of Westminster	Samaia Tchapesseka	25		Westminster City	England
Croydon, London	Georgina Osei-Hwere	25		Croydon	England
(Scotland) Dundee	Abigail Gliksten	27		Dundee	Scotland
East England	Michaela Carew	26		Cambridge	England
East London	Rosemary Lloyd	26		London	England
(England) East Midlands	Stephanie Hill	25	1.80 m (5 ft 11 in)	Hope Valley	England
Edinburgh	Lisa He	23		Edinburgh	Scotland
(Scotland) Glasgow	Amy Meisak	26	1.70 m (5 ft 7 in)	Glasgow	Scotland
Greater London	Nia Feisal	22		London	England
Greenwich, London	Tasharn Sanganoo	20	1.73 m (5 ft 8 in)	Greenwich	England
(Wales) Gwent	Fern Gasson	24		Monmouthshire	Wales
Hampshire	Pratishtha Raut	26		Farnborough	England
Kent	Felicity Shaw	25		Royal Tunbridge Wells	England
(Scotland) Lothian	Celidh Den Heijer	20		Edinburgh	Scotland
Mid Glamorgan	Sophie Moulds	27	1.79 m (5 ft 10 in)	Ferndale	Wales
Milton Keynes, Buckinghamshire	Meg Zeenat Wamithi	22		Milton Keynes	England
Northamptonshire	Jemma Johnstone	24		Northampton	England
North East England	Jade Bambrough	26	1.75 m (5 ft 9 in)	Sunderland	England
North England	Joanna Johnson	26		Blackpool	England
North London	Umida Ibrahimova	27		London	England
North West England	Saarah Ahmed	19		Carlisle	England
Nottinghamshire	Laisha Johnson	26		Nottingham	England
Oxfordshire	Roisin Richardson	23		Oxford	England
South East England	Sharon Gaffka	24	1.72 m (5 ft 8 in)	Oxford	England
South England	Kirstyn Davenport	23		Winchester	England
South London	Radhika Dave	26		Bromley	England
South West England	Darby Isaac Upton	21		Bristol	England
Surrey	Fallonne Rose	22		Dorking	England
West London	Trishala Lakhani	24		London	England
(West Midlands (county)) West Midlands	Sophie Dunning	27	1.78 m (5 ft 10 in)	Shropshire	England
Westminster, London	Mishelle Thurairatnam	25		Westminster	England
West Scotland	Rebecca Elder	20		Paisley	Scotland
(England) Yorkshire and The Humber	Priya Bagga	24		Huddersfield	England
