= Stephanie Hill (model) =

English actress and model (born 1995)

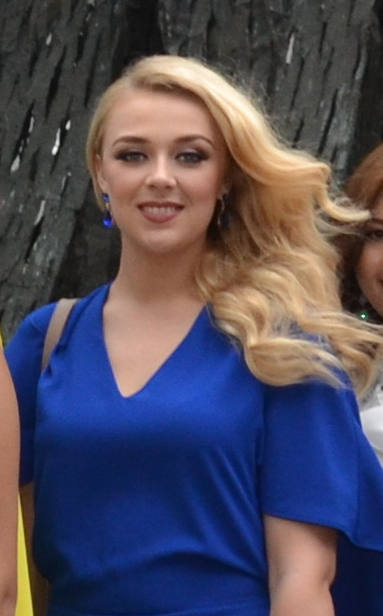
- Hill visiting National Museum of Indonesia in 2018
- Born: 8 January 1995 (age 31); Sheffield, South Yorkshire, England
- Education: First Class Bachelor of Science Degree in Radiotherapy and Oncology from Sheffield Hallam University Master of Science (Research) Degree in Translational Oncology from University of Sheffield
- Occupations: Model; equestrian; beauty pageant titleholder
- Height: 1.80 m (5 ft 11 in)
- Beauty pageant titleholder
- Title: Miss England 2017
- Hair colour: Blonde
- Eye color: Blue
- Major competitions: Miss England 2017 (Winner); Miss World 2017 (2nd Runner-Up) (Miss World Europe); Miss Universe Great Britain 2020 (Top 18); Miss Universe Great Britain 2021 (Top 5); Miss Universe Great Britain 2022 (Top 18)

Stephanie Hill (born 8 January 1995) is an English model, equestrian and beauty pageant titleholder who won Miss England 2017. She represented England at Miss World 2017 held in Sanya, China on 18 November 2017 and was 2nd runner-up. She competed at Miss Universe Great Britain 2020.

== Early life ==
Stephanie Hill was born on 8 January 1995 in Sheffield, England. She graduated from the Sheffield Hallam University with a First Class Bachelor of Science Degree with Honours in Radiotherapy and Oncology, as well as graduating from University of Sheffield with a master's degree in Translational Oncology. She has been placed at Horse of the Year Show.

== Career ==
=== Miss England 2017 ===
Representing Hope Valley, Hill was crowned Miss England 2017 by outgoing titleholder Elizabeth Grant after bested 49 other delegates at the national finale held at Resorts World Birmingham on 14 July 2017. The win qualified her to represent her country at Miss World 2017 which was later held on 18 November 2017 in Sanya, China.

=== Miss World 2017 ===
During the process of the pageant, Hill was shortlisted in three challenge events: top 20 at Beauty With A Purpose; top 8 at Multimedia; and 3rd runner-up at Talent. She also won continental title, Miss World Europe. On the final night she was the second runner-up.

=== Miss Universe Great Britain 2020 ===
On March 8, 2021, Hill competed in Miss Universe Great Britain 2020, which was held virtually. Despite being a heavy favourite at the said competition, Stephanie failed to win the coveted title. After this competition ended, Stephanie Hill returned to work focusing on Urgent Public Health Studies, focusing on COVID-19 clinical trials.

Awards and achievements
Preceded by Elizabeth Grant	Miss England; 2017	Succeeded by Alisha Cowie
Preceded by Natasha Mannuela Halim (Indonesia)	Miss World 2nd Runner-up; 2017	Succeeded by (Belarus) Maria Vasilevich (Jamaica) Kadijah Robinson (Uganda) Quiin Abenakyo (Top 5)
