= Archaeological site =

Place in which evidence of past activity is preserved

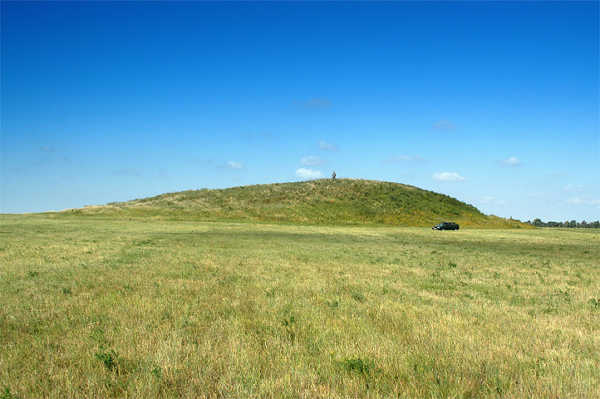
An archaeological site with human presence dating from 4th century BCE, Fillipovka, South Urals, Russia. This site has been interpreted as a Sarmatian Kurgan.

An archaeological site is a place (or group of physical sites) in which evidence of past activity is preserved (either prehistoric or historic or contemporary), and which has been, or may be, investigated using the discipline of archaeology and represents a part of the archaeological record. Sites may range from those with few or no remains visible above ground, to buildings and other structures still in use.

Beyond this, the definition and geographical extent of a "site" can vary widely, depending on the period studied and the theoretical approach of the archaeologist.

== Geographical extent ==
It is almost invariably difficult to delimit a site. It is sometimes taken to indicate a settlement of some sort, although the archaeologist must also define the limits of human activity around the settlement. Any episode of deposition, such as a hoard or burial, can form a site as well. Development-led archaeology undertaken as cultural resources management has the disadvantage (or the benefit) of having its sites defined by the limits of the intended development. Even in this case, however, in describing and interpreting the site, the archaeologist will have to look outside the boundaries of the building site.

According to Jess Beck in "How Do Archaeologists Find Sites?", areas with numerous artifacts are good targets for future excavation, while areas with a small number of artifacts are thought to reflect a lack of past human activity. Many areas have been discovered by accident. The most common people who have found artifacts are farmers who are plowing their fields or just cleaning them up, and they often find archaeological artifacts. Many people who are out hiking and even pilots find artifacts, and they usually end up reporting them to archaeologists for further investigation. When they find sites, they have to first record the area, and if they have the money and time for the site, they can begin digging.

== Field survey ==
There are many ways to find sites, one example can be through surveys. Surveys involve walking around analyzing the land and looking for artifacts. It can also involve digging, according to the Archaeological Institute of America, "archaeologists actively search areas that were likely to support human populations, or in places where old documents and records indicate people once lived." This helps archaeologists in the future. In case there is no time or money during the site's discovery, archaeologists can come back and visit the site for further digging to find out the extent of the site. Archaeologist can also sample randomly within a given area of land as another form of conducting surveys.

Surveys are very useful, according to Jess Beck, "it can tell you where people were living at different points in the past.Geophysics is a branch of survey becoming more and more popular in archaeology, because it uses different types of instruments to investigate features below the ground surface. It is not as reliable because although they can see what is under the surface of the ground, it does not produce the best picture. Archaeologists still have to dig up the area in order to uncover the truth. There are also two most common types of geophysical survey, which is, magnetometer and ground penetrating radar.

Magnetometry is the technique of measuring and mapping patterns of magnetism in the soil. It uses an instrument called a magnetometer, which is required to measure and map traces of soil magnetism. The ground penetrating radar is a method that uses radar pulses to image the subsurface. It uses electromagnetic radiation in the microwave band of the radio spectrum and detects the reflected signals from subsurface structures.

There are many other tools that can be used to find artifacts, but along with finding artifacts, archaeologists have to make maps. They do so by taking data from surveys, or archival research and plugging it into a Geographical Information Systems (GIS) and that will contain both locational information and a combination of various information. This tool is very helpful to archaeologists who want to explore in a different area and want to see if anyone else has done research. They can use this tool to see what has already been discovered. With this information available, archaeologists can expand their research and add more to what has already been found.

Traditionally, sites are distinguished by the presence of both artifacts and features. Common features include the remains of hearths and houses. Ecofacts, biological materials (such as bones, scales, and even feces) that are the result of human activity but are not deliberately modified, are also common at many archaeological sites. In the cases of the Palaeolithic and Mesolithic eras, a mere scatter of flint flakes will also constitute a site worthy of study. Different archaeologists may see an ancient town, and its nearby cemetery as being two different sites, or as being part of the same wider site. The precepts of landscape archaeology attempt to see each discrete unit of human activity in the context of the wider environment, further distorting the concept of the site as a demarcated area. Furthermore, geoarchaeologists or environmental archaeologists would also consider a sequence of natural geological or organic deposition, in the absence of human activity, to constitute a site worthy of study.

Archaeological sites usually form through human-related processes but can be subject to natural, post-depositional factors. Cultural remnants which have been buried by sediments are, in many environments, more likely to be preserved than exposed cultural remnants. Natural actions resulting in sediment being deposited include alluvial (water-related) or aeolian (wind-related) natural processes. In jungles and other areas of lush plant growth, decomposed vegetative sediment can result in layers of soil deposited over remains. Colluviation, the burial of a site by sediments moved by gravity (called hillwash) can also happen at sites on slopes. Human activities (both deliberate and incidental) also often bury sites. It is common in many cultures for newer structures to be built atop the remains of older ones. Urban archaeology has developed especially to deal with these sorts of site.

Many sites are the subject of ongoing excavation or investigation. Note the difference between archaeological sites and archaeological discoveries.

== Gallery ==
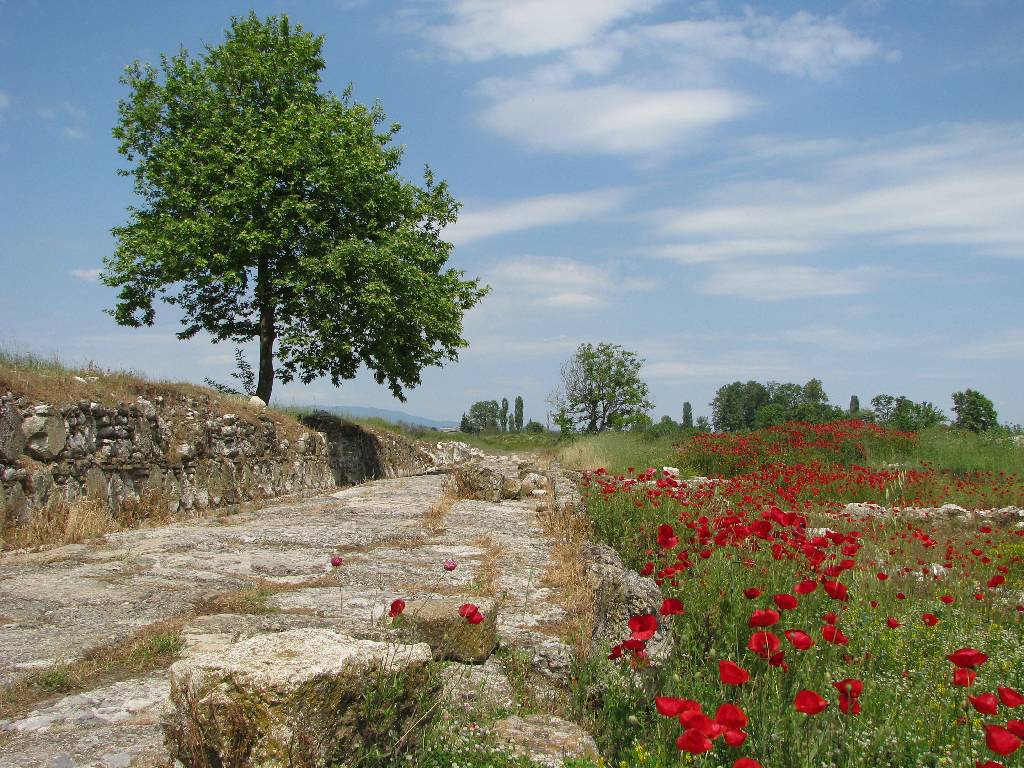
Dion archaeological site in Greece

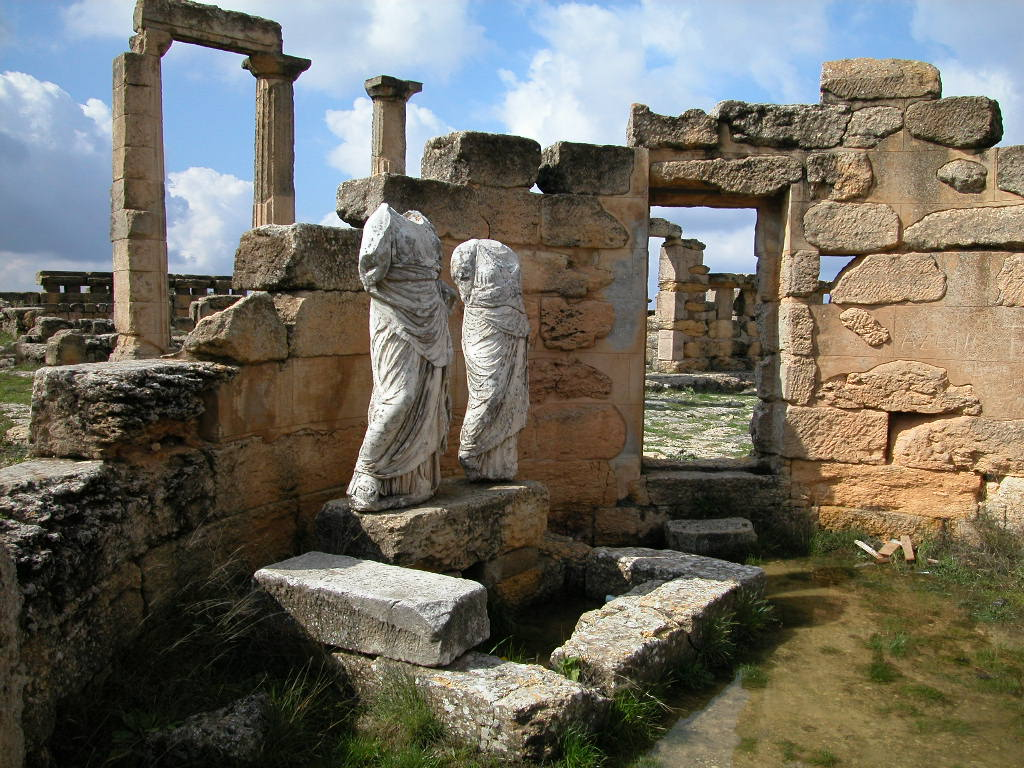
Archaeological site of Cyrene, Libya

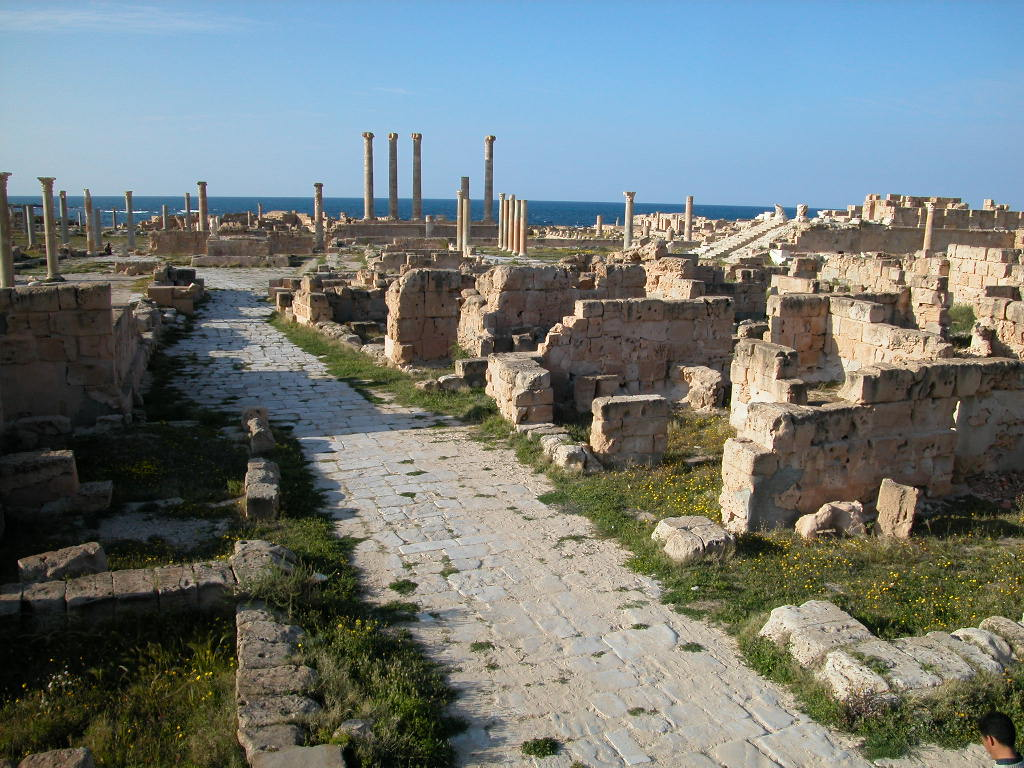
Archaeological site of Sabratha, Libya

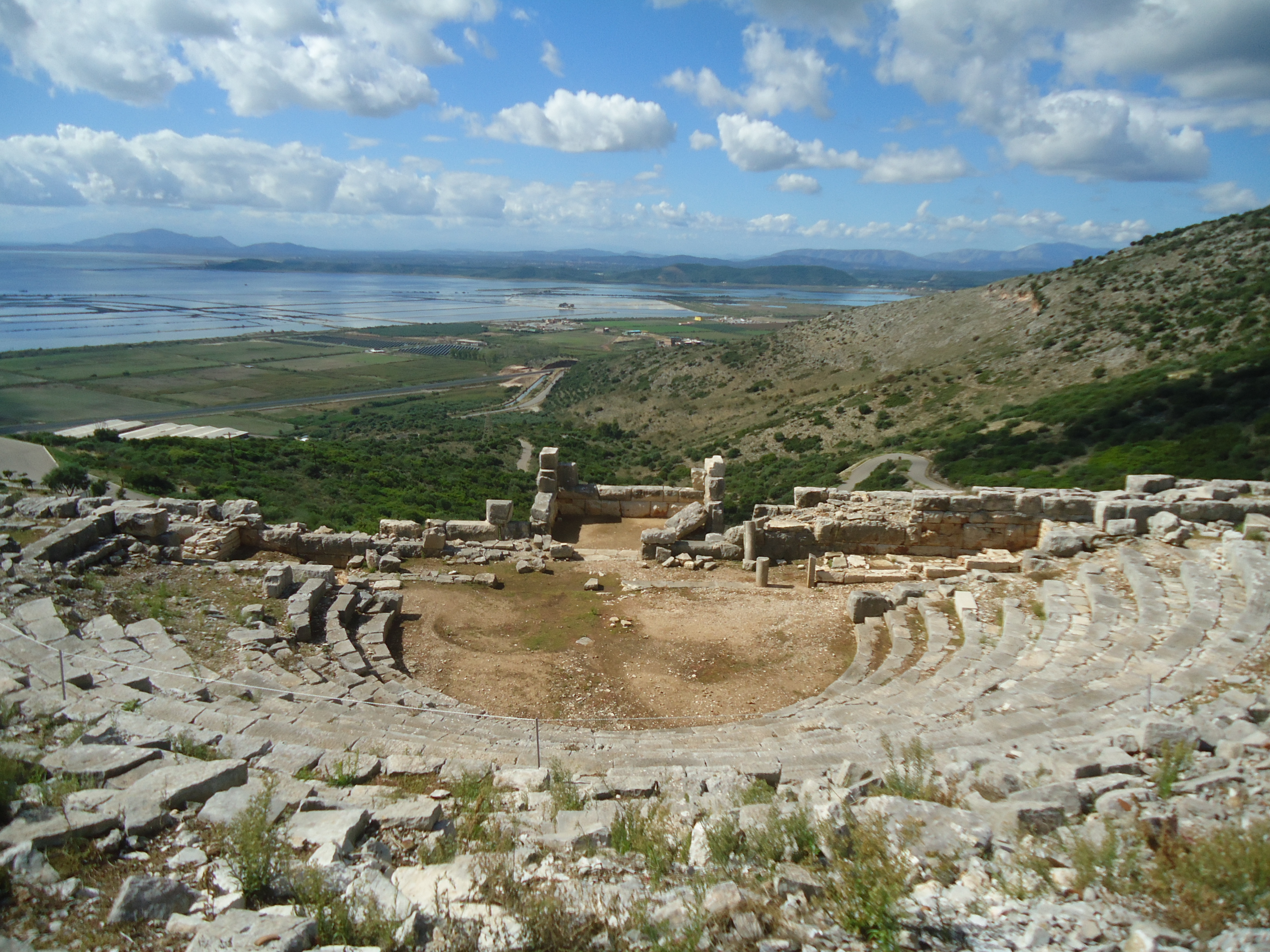
Pleuron, Aetolia archaeological site in Greece

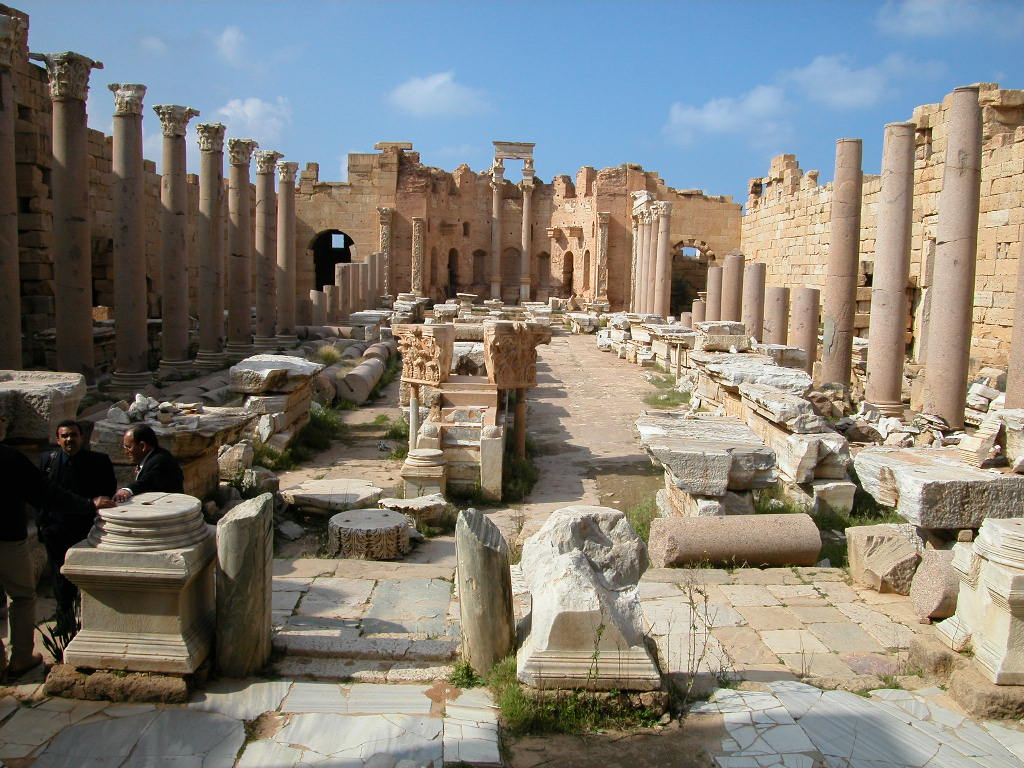
Leptis Magna archaeological site, Libya

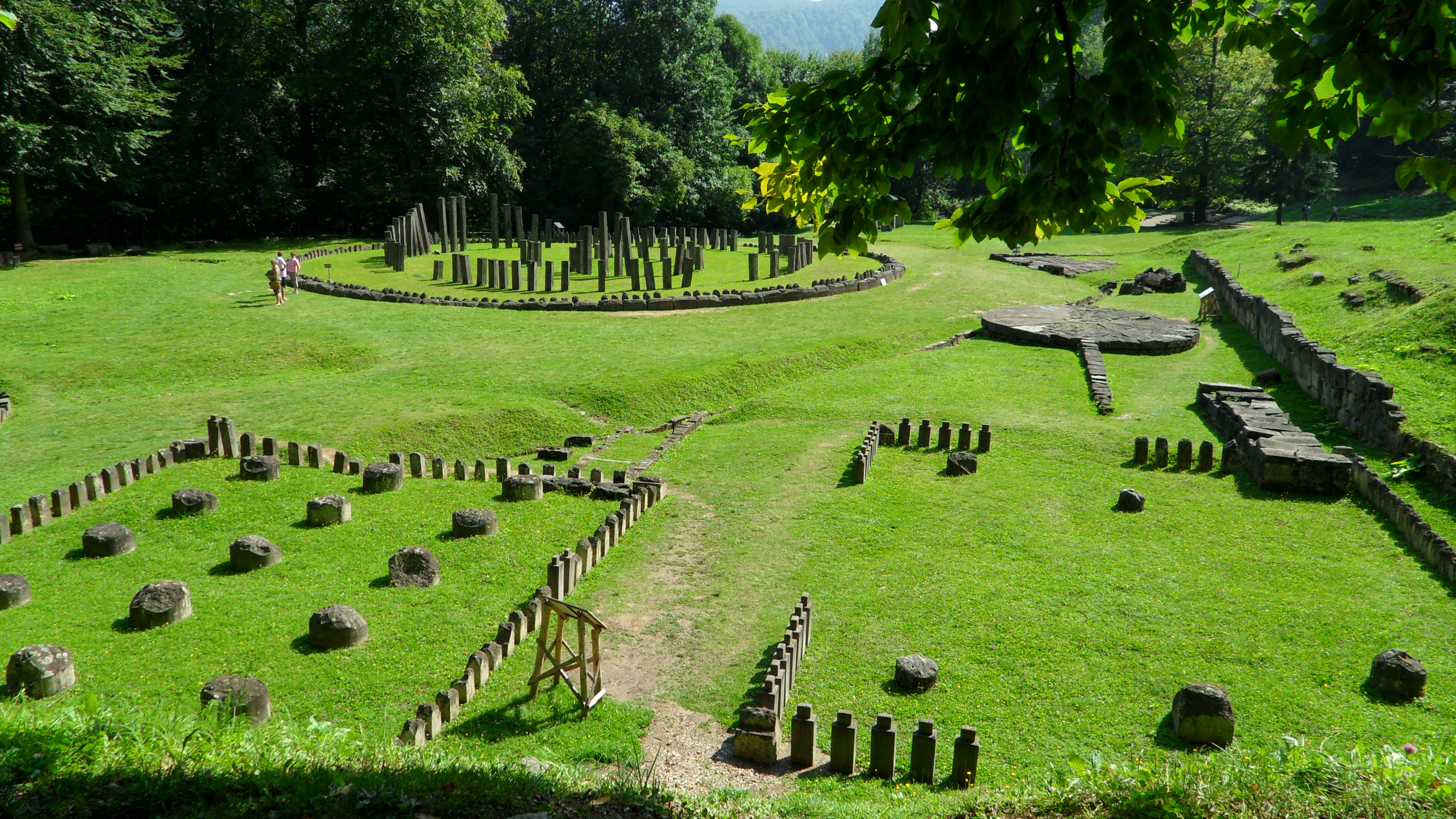
Sarmizegetusa Regia, archaeological site in Romania

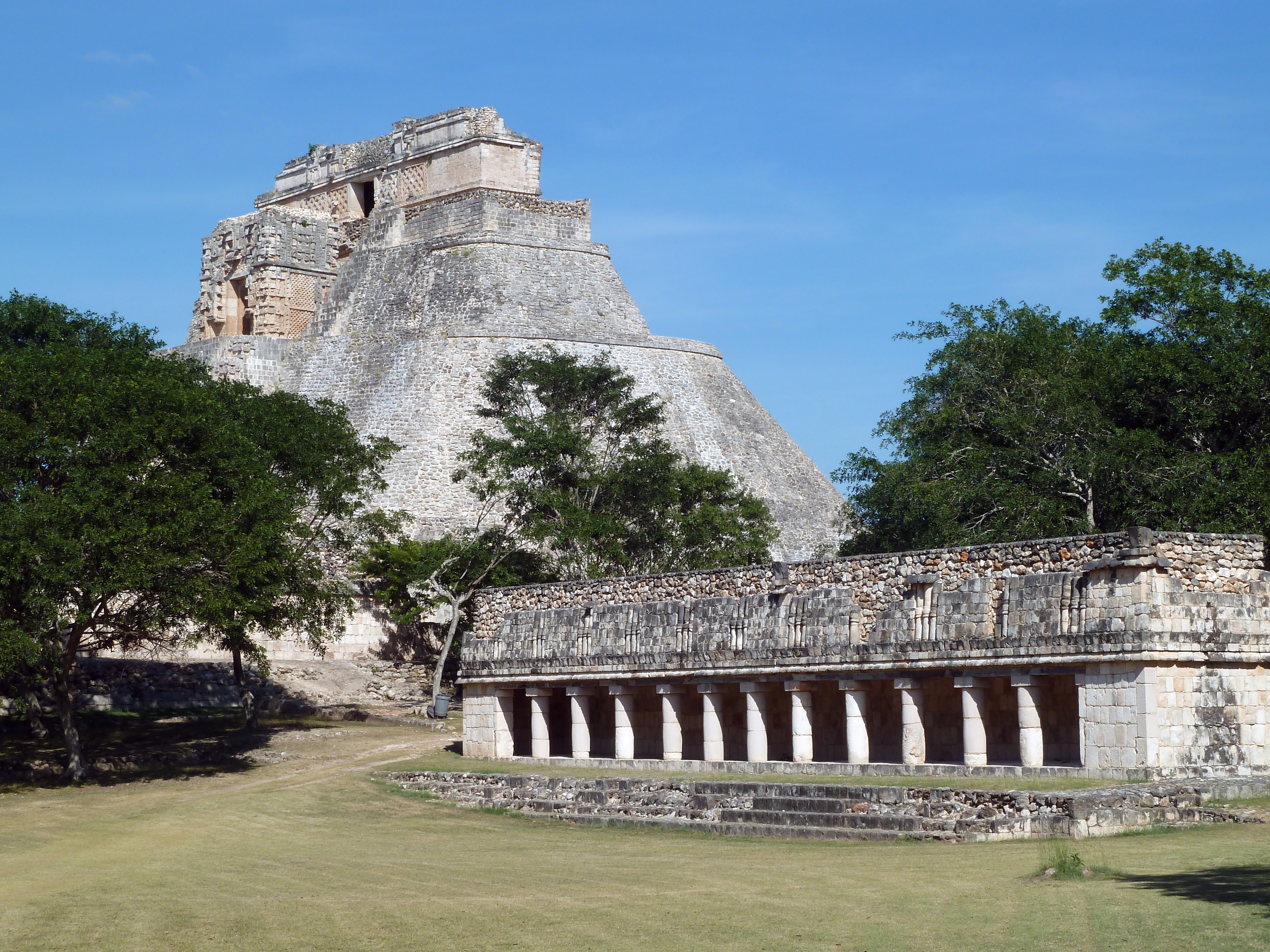
A Maya site in Uxmal, Mexico (6th to 10th centuries CE)

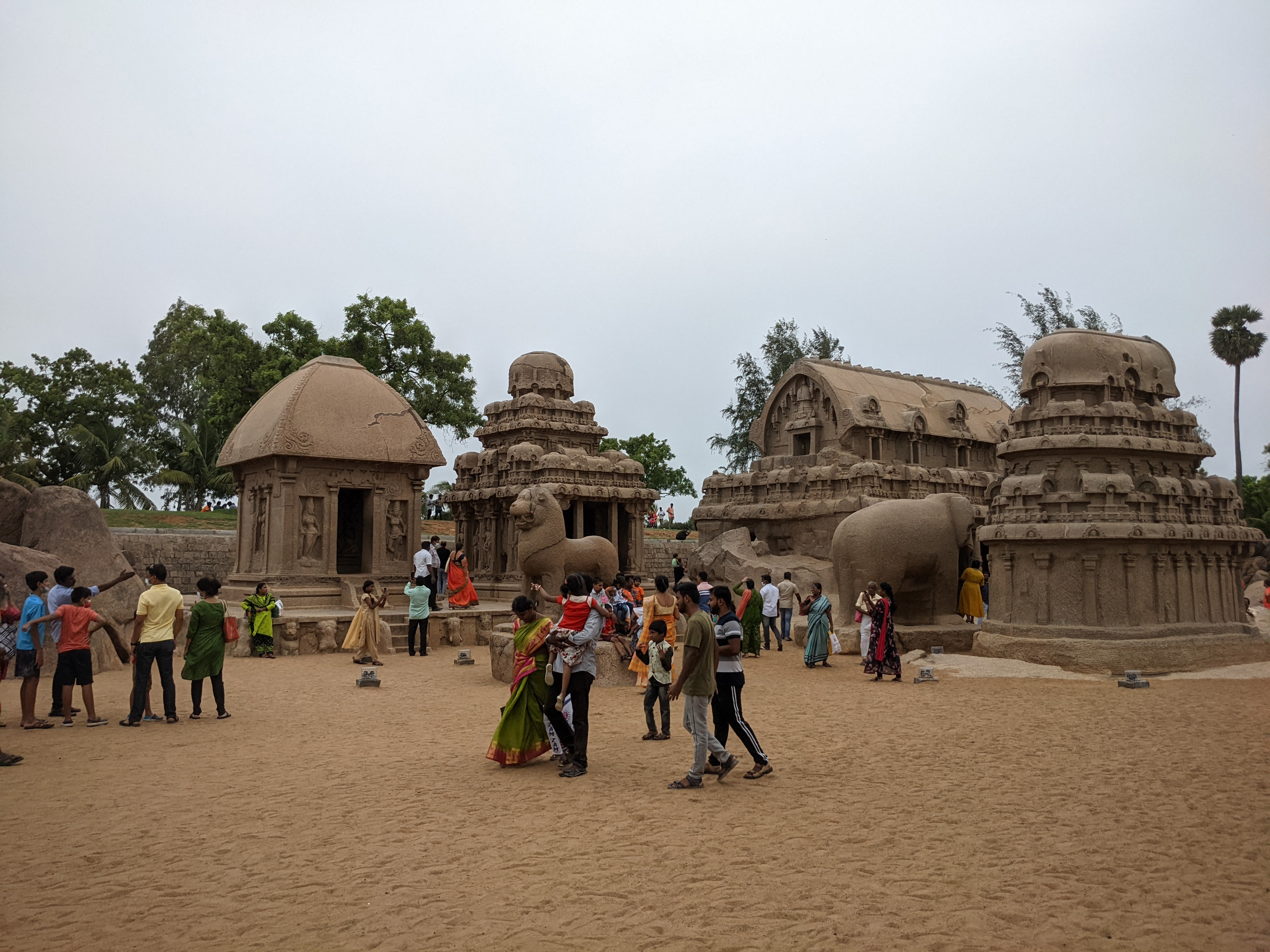
Pancha Rathas at Mahabalipuram, an archaeological site in Tamil Nadu, India (7th to 8th centuries CE)

Terracotta Army, part of the Mausoleum of Qin Shi Huang in Shaanxi, China (246-208 BCE)

== See also ==
- Archaeological ethics – Branch of archaeological philosophy
- Conservation and restoration of archaeological sites
- List of archaeological sites by country
- Site museum – Archeological museums located at or near a site
- Site survey – Inspections of an area where work is proposed, to gather information
- Valletta Treaty – Multilateral treaty of the Council of Europe
