= Newport medieval ship =

Medieval ship found in Newport, Wales

Coordinates: 51°35′18″N 2°59′37″W

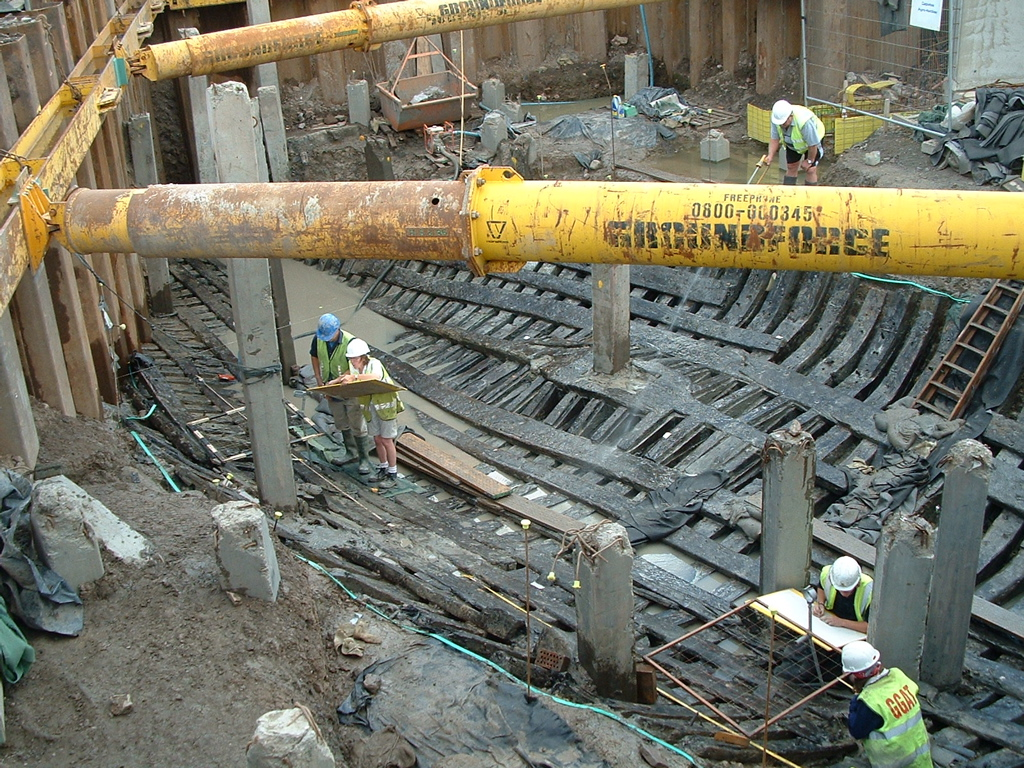
The Newport ship in the foundations of the Riverfront Arts Centre, 8 September 2002

The Newport medieval ship is a mid-fifteenth-century sailing vessel discovered when archaeologists investigated an articulated timber structure uncovered during the building of the Riverfront Arts Centre in Newport in June 2002. The site is on the west bank of the River Usk, which runs through the city centre. The remains of the ship suffered some damage from the construction work, but still represents a substantial find of a late Medieval ship, together with significant artefacts and environmental material. Previously called simply the "Newport ship", the official name of the vessel is now the Newport Medieval Ship, to help distinguish it from other historical vessels.

The ship was originally around 116 feet (35 metres) long and has been estimated to be of 161 tons burden – that being the number of tuns of Bordeaux wine that could have stowed in its hold. Vessels of this size were considered 'great ships' by contemporary standards and were typically used for the long-distance trade between Britain, Biscay and southern Iberia.

The most likely construction date of the ship is immediately after the winter of 1457/8. This date was obtained by oxygen isotope dendrochronology. An earlier standard dendrochronology study (measuring the width of annual growth rings) has given a likely felling date of 1449 for the majority of the timbers. This earlier study identified Basque region of Northern Spain as the source of the shipbuilding timber. This is an area well known for its shipbuilding industry at this time. Timbers associated with later phases of repair come from Britain, as do a large number of structural pieces dating from c.1466. These timbers have been associated with the major renovation work being carried out in Newport at the time the vessel foundered. Remnants of a cradle found beneath the ship suggested that it had been berthed for repair but then abandoned after the supports on the starboard side gave way. Many of the artefacts in the ship, such as coins, pottery and plant remains, suggest that it was trading with Portugal in the 1450s–1460s.

Although there were no initial plans to preserve the ship in its entirety, local people campaigned eagerly to ensure this, leading to the foundation of the Friends of the Newport Ship. Initial estimates suggested that preservation would cost about £3.5 million and this sum was eventually found by the Welsh Assembly Government and Newport City Council. All of the ship's timbers have subsequently been raised and transferred to a dedicated industrial unit which the local council describes as "now the biggest wood conservation centre in the UK", where preservation and research continue. Due to its size, it has not been possible to display the ship in the basement of the new arts centre, as was originally proposed.

== Loss of the ship ==
The River Usk has a large tidal range and it appears that the vessel was deballasted and carefully floated into a side channel or Pîl on a very high tide and then situated on a pre-erected cradle made of oak and elm logs. This cradle has an earliest date possible of the spring of 1468 (by dendrochronology). The ship appears to have been undergoing a major refit, as evidenced by the shaping and inserting of British-grown timber (dating to after 1465) into the vessel. However, before this repair work could be completed, the cradle appears to have collapsed, with the ship heeling over onto its starboard side. The subsequent incoming tides appear to have flooded the vessel with silt and water. However, efforts were made to drain, pump out and right the ship, and when these failed attention turned to salvaging the accessible timber and iron (for reuse), along with removing larger items such as anchors, guns and rigging. The salvaging of the vessel involved hacking at the upper works with axes and removing substantial amounts of the lapstrake planking, framing and internal timbers. The salvaged material would have been readily reusable in other ships or building works. During this salvage work, numerous disarticulated timbers accrued in the hold of the vessel.

== Condition, dimensions and structure ==
The excellent condition of the ship's timbers may possibly be due to the low oxygen level in the mud of the River Usk which has inhibited the presence of wood-boring creatures. Some time during its berth the port (left) side of the ship was cut down about 9 feet (2.7 metres) above the keel, but fortuitously this has preserved the correct shape of the hull. The starboard (right) side, which collapsed onto the river mud long ago, together with the ship's frames, has been preserved to almost its full height, although some planking has been distorted by the collapse.

The ship's dimensions have now been estimated at around 116 feet (35 metres) in length and around 27 feet (8.2 metres) in width. It had an estimated carrying capacity of 161 'tons burden'. That was a contemporary measure of ship size, based on the number of tuns (a size of barrel) of wine a ship could carry. In the 1460s customs accounts of nearby Bristol, vessels of 150+ tons were typically called 'navis' (great ship) and used primarily for the long-distance voyages to southern Europe, particularly Lisbon.

The vessel was clinker built with each plank overlapping the one below, the lower plank always being on the inside of the one above. The planks of the outer hull were positioned first and, on the Newport Ship, are secured to each other with iron nails driven through the overlap from the outside and then fitted with iron rove plates. The end of each nail was then hammered flat against the rove to produce a tight seal. Gaps along the overlap were secured by caulking with tar and animal hair. Hair from horse, cow, sheep and goat has all been identified in the Newport ship. The frames (ribs) of the ship were then fitted inside the hull and secured to the planks. Each framing piece was secured to the keel (spine) of the ship by having its keel cutout placed over the keel and held by precision of fit. Nails and trenails have not been used in this ship to secure frames to keel. The keel is made of beech, but the rest of the ship is made of oak, although no reason for this has yet been suggested. One possible explanation is a simple shortage of oak compared with beech at the time of construction. The hull planking is radially split oak which has been finished with an axe or adze. The keel and frames are also finished with an axe or adze. This contrasts with the stringers, hatch covers, ceiling and deck planks, which were all sawn.

Inside the frames are stringers: longitudinal structural components. Seven runs of stringers were found on the more-preserved starboard side. Between the stringers, the inside of the hull was lined with ceiling planks – these are thinner than the stringers and, together with the stringers, serve to stop cargo or ballast from coming into contact with the inside of the external planking of the hull. (Note: The ceiling planks were, on average, 25mm thick whilst the stringers varied from 48 to 97mm in thickness. The ceiling planks were fastened to the frames with small iron nails, whilst the stringers were connected to the frames with two oak treenails of about 30mm diameter at each intersection.) Both the stringers and ceiling planks were made of sawn oak, in contrast to the radially split hull planks and the hewn framing. The highest surviving stringer shows evidence of supporting the first deck.

Cleaning of the timbers has led to the discovery, on the planking of the outer hull, of a series of marks deliberately scribed into the timbers. These appear to be either individual shipwrights' marks or instructions for the positioning of planks or fastenings. The conservation team is hoping that a pattern will emerge as the recording process continues. During mid 2007, the cleaning of barrel-top fragments revealed merchant marks. Some of these may resemble known marks of merchants from the city of Bristol, but this is not proof that they originated there.

== Dating the ship ==
The first phase of dendrochronology showed that most of the timbers used to build the ship originate from the Basque Country of northern Spain dating from c.1449. A later oxygen isotope dendrochronology study of components used in the original construction give a felling date of the winter of 1457/8. Since it was the practice to use green timber in ship construction at this time, the build date is most likely very shortly after this felling date. This date of winter 1457/1458 is confirmed by oxygen isotope dendrochronology analysis of the beech keel (a timber species which, unlike oak, does not have a substantial ring-width dendrochronology database). The precise geographic origin of the original build timber will require further work to develop the dendrochronological database for north-western Spain. At present the best matches are with timber grown in the upland interior of the Basque region of Spain. As the database is expanded, better matches may be found within the same general area.

The discovery in the spring of 2006 of a French "petit blanc" (small white) silver coin inserted into a cut out in the stempost/keel join was a major step forward. Placed, perhaps, as a token of good fortune at the start of the ship's construction, this coin was minted in Crémieu in the Dauphinois region of France between May and July 1447. Tree trunks found under the hull and forming the support for the ship when under repair, have a latest dendrochronology date of the spring of 1468. This would give the ship a working life span of less than 10 years.

There is circumstantial evidence that by 1469 the ship may have belonged to and been under repair for the Earl of Warwick. A letter of authorisation dated 22 November 1469 from Warwick to Thomas Throkmorton, his receiver of Glamorgan and Morgannwg, authorised various payments for "the making of the ship at Newport" which could be construed as repairs to the badly damaged vessel. This association of the ship with known historical figures is questioned as being a common failing of historians when studying archaeological remains. The simplest (though not only) explanation is that this was a ship from the Iberian peninsula that required some repairs whilst in the Bristol area. Research has shown that Newport sometimes had some very large vessels in the fifteenth and sixteenth century, like the Newport Medieval Ship. These were used primarily to serve the long-distance trade of Bristol, which was then the second port of the realm.

== Artefacts ==
During excavation several hundred objects were found within the ship, ranging from a stone cannonball to grape seeds and including a damaged hour glass, 13 single shoes of which one is a very expensive shoe, pieces of cork and some Portuguese coins. The seeds, cork and coins would suggest trade to and from the Iberian Peninsula and the presence of Merino sheep wool in the caulking material supports this idea; but is not conclusive proof. Members of the Albaola Society based Pasaia, near San Sebastian in the Basque region of Spain, after studying the ship's structural details believe that the ship may have been built by Basque shipwrights, either in the Basque region of Spain or south-western France. Artefacts, including Portuguese coins and ceramic shards, along with waterlogged plant remains indicate strong trading links with Portugal, with a strong possibility that the vessel was Portuguese-crewed. The ceramic shards are nearly all Iberian micaceous red-ware and likely Portuguese in origin. The ceramic assemblage is highly variable in form and also some pieces are soot stained, leading to the conclusion that this material represents crew items as opposed to cargo.

The environmental samples also contained a variety of well-preserved plant, insect and faunal remains. Foodstuffs including walnuts, almonds, hazelnuts, pomegranates, grapes, figs and olives were found, along with over a thousand fish and animal bones. Cod, hake, ling, tusk, herring, blackspot bream, conger, flatfish and Atlantic salmon are just some of the species represented in the fishbone assemblage. Shellfish recovered included oysters, whelks, mussels and cockles. Human fleas, dog fleas and numerous flies were present in the bilges of the ship, as well as some interesting beetles, including the woodboring beetle, which has never been found in the UK before. The animal bone collection primarily consisted of domesticated cattle, goats, sheep and pigs. Archaeologists also found rat bones and quantities of domestic fowl bones. In addition to salted or smoked meats and fish, it is likely that livestock was kept on board, as evidenced by certain grass and plant remains that are suited for animal food and bedding.

== Project progress ==
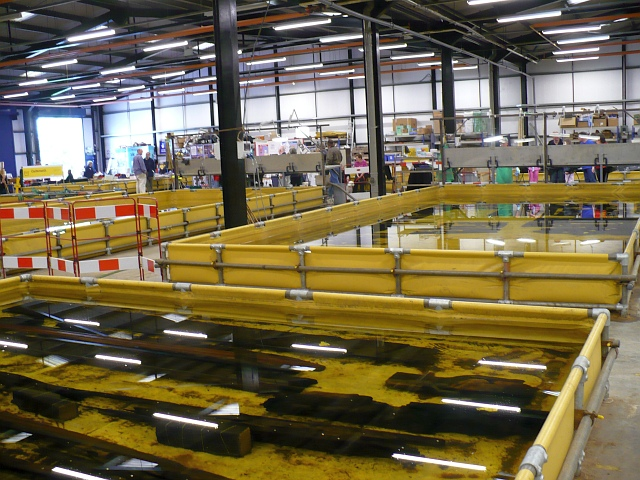
Timbers from the Newport ship undergoing conservation, 2008

The first stage of the restoration project; the cleaning and recording of the timbers, was completed in April 2008. The timbers were immersed in ordinary mains water, in a series of large shallow tanks. Once the cleaning had been completed the timbers were individually recorded using a FaroArm, a portable coordinate measuring machine (CMM), and RHINO software. This technology was used to produce 3-dimensional rotatable images of each artefact found in the vessel to submillimeter precision, allowing for the close study of each timber and an accurate recording of any blemishes or damage to the timbers. The Newport ship was one of the first marine archeological projects to pioneer the use of Faro equipment and RHINO software.

The next stage, the conservation of the timbers, which began later in 2008, involved immersing the timbers in polyethylene glycol (PEG) solution for an extended period. Before this began, some of the timbers required treatment with triammonium citrate to remove residual iron residues in the nail holes of the outer hull planking. This unexpected additional phase added no more than between fifteen and eighteen months to the project.

In September 2016 all of the ship's timbers completed their PEG treatment cycle and are now being freeze dried to draw out all of the residual water in preparation for the eventual reconstruction of the vessel. As of August 2019, 60% of the timbers have been freeze dried with all the timbers set to be returned by 2021.

A conference entitled "The World of the Newport Ship" was held at the University of Bristol on 17–18 July 2014, examining the vessel, her significance and her historical context. This led to the production of an edited volume based on the work of the contributors, published by the University of Wales Press.

Most current funding for the preservation of the ship comes from the Heritage Lottery Fund with smaller contributions from the National Assembly for Wales, Newport City Council and the Friends of Newport Ship.

== Viewing ==
The Friends of Newport Ship organises regular open days when the project may be viewed in its current state of restoration along with exhibits to explain the restoration process. Visitors have the opportunity to talk to members of the ship team, and find out about the excavation and the campaign to save the ship, through tours of the facility run by the support group Friends of the Newport Ship. Generally the Ship Centre is open every Friday and Saturday from 10.30-4.0pm, between Easter and the end of October, and then on Saturdays only from spring half term until Easter and for November and early December.

== Bibliography ==
- "Ship's Papers" (PDF). S.O.S.: The Newsletter of the Friends of the Newport Ship. Autumn 2005. pp. 4–5. Archived from the original (PDF) on 21 August 2016.
- Head, Viv (2017). Sailing Ships of the Bristol Channel. Amberley. pp. 10–12. ISBN 978-1445664002.
- Hocker, Fred (2 January 2019). "The World of the Newport Medieval Ship: Trade, politics and shipping in the mid-ﬁfteenth century". The Mariner's Mirror. 105 (1): 93–94. doi:10.1080/00253359.2019.1559624.
- Jones, Evan T (2018). "1: Introduction". In Jones, Evan Thomas; Stone, Richard G (eds.). The world of the Newport medieval ship: trade, politics and shipping in the mid-fifteenth century. Cardiff: University of Wales press. ISBN 978-1-78683-263-4.
- Jones, Evan T (2018a). "8: The shipping industry of the Severn Sea". In Jones, Evan Thomas; Stone, Richard G (eds.). The world of the Newport medieval ship: trade, politics and shipping in the mid-fifteenth century. Cardiff: University of Wales press. ISBN 978-1-78683-263-4.
- Nayling, Nigel; Jones, Toby (September 2014). "The Newport Medieval Ship, Wales, United Kingdom: The Newport Medieval Ship". International Journal of Nautical Archaeology. 43 (2): 239–278. doi:10.1111/1095-9270.12053.
- Nayling, Nigel; Jones, Toby (2018). "2: Archaeological Analysis of a Fifteenth-Century Merchant Ship". In Jones, Evan Thomas; Stone, Richard G (eds.). The world of the Newport medieval ship: trade, politics and shipping in the mid-fifteenth century. Cardiff: University of Wales press. ISBN 978-1-78683-263-4.
- Nayling, Nigel; Loader, Neil J.; Bale, Roderick J.; Davies, Darren; McCarroll, Danny; Daux, Valérie (2 November 2023). "Oxygen Isotope Dendrochronology of the Newport Medieval Ship". International Journal of Nautical Archaeology: 1–9. doi:10.1080/10572414.2023.2266473.
- Nayling, Nigel; Loader, Neil J.; Bale, Roderick J.; Davies, Darren; McCarroll, Danny; Daux, Valérie (25 March 2024). "Inter-Genus Oxygen Isotope Dendrochronology of the Newport Medieval Ship Keel". International Journal of Nautical Archaeology: 1–6. doi:10.1080/10572414.2024.2326985.
- Nayling, Nigel; Susperregi, Josué (September 2014). "Iberian Dendrochronology and the Newport Medieval Ship: Iberian Dendrochronology and the Newport Medieval Ship". International Journal of Nautical Archaeology. 43 (2): 279–291. doi:10.1111/1095-9270.12052.
- Trett, Bob (2018). "5: Newport during the fifteenth century". In Jones, Evan Thomas; Stone, Richard G (eds.). The world of the Newport medieval ship: trade, politics and shipping in the mid-fifteenth century. Cardiff: University of Wales press. ISBN 978-1-78683-263-4.
