= Valletta Treaty =

Multilateral treaty of the Council of Europe

Valletta Treaty (or Malta Treaty)
European Convention on the Protection of the Archaeological Heritage (Revised)
- Signed: 16 January 1992
- Location: Valletta
- Effective: 25 May 1995
- Condition: 4 ratifications
- Parties: 45
- Depositary: Secretary General of the Council of Europe
- Language: English and French

The Valletta Treaty (formally the European Convention on the Protection of the Archaeological Heritage (Revised), also known as the Malta Convention) is a multilateral treaty of the Council of Europe. The 1992 treaty aims to protect the European archaeological heritage "as a source of European collective memory and as an instrument for historical and scientific study". All remains and objects and any other traces of humankind from past times are considered to be elements of the archaeological heritage. The archaeological heritage shall include structures, constructions, groups of buildings, developed sites, moveable objects, monuments of other kinds as well as their context, whether situated on land or under water." (Art. 1)

The Valletta Convention is an international legally binding treaty within Europe. It places the revised Convention in the framework of activities of the Council of Europe concerning the cultural heritage since the European Cultural Convention came into force.

It deals with the protection, preservation and scientific research of archaeological heritage in Europe. In particular, the revised Convention focuses on the problem of conservation of archaeological heritage in the face of development projects. Other threats to the archaeological heritage are:

- Natural disasters
- Illicit and unscientific excavations
- Lack of public awareness

In accordance with the Preamble, objectives of the revised Convention are:

- To integrate the conservation and archaeological investigation of archaeological heritage in urban and regional planning policies;
- To establish a co-operation and consultation processes between archaeologists, and project developers;
- To set standards for funding and archaeological and conservational methods used in studying the “knowledge of the history of mankind”;
- To promote educational actions and public awareness of the necessity of the protection and investigation of archaeological heritage in Europe; and
- To foster international co-operation and joint action among all European countries in the field of archaeological resource management by means of developing and exchanging relevant scientific information, technologies and expertise.

== Definition of the archaeological heritage ==
In Article 1 of the revised Convention archaeological heritage is defined. The article aims to emphasise the importance of both protection and scientific investigation of archaeological heritage as "a source of the European collective memory".

Considering the ICOMOS Charter for the Protection and Management of the Archaeological Heritage 1990, "archaeological knowledge is based principally on the scientific investigation of the archaeological heritage". Consequentially, destructive as well as non-destructive scientific methods can be carried out with the provision that an excavation is seen as an ultima ratio to gain knowledge about the archaeological heritage of Europe.

An element of archaeological heritage is given if there is any trace of human existence of the past displaying an interaction with the natural environment and enhancing our knowledge of human history, which was discovered by archaeological techniques. Therefore, not only artefacts of an archaeological site are of value but "all remains and objects and any other traces of mankind". Furthermore, the article gives examples of elements that are included in its concept of archaeological heritage:

- Immovable objects: Structures, walls, groups of buildings, sites, monuments, burials etc.
- Movable objects: Sculptures, artefacts, etc.
- The context (land or sea)

== Identification of the heritage and measures for protection ==
=== Article 2 ===
States parties to the revised Convention shall:

- “Institute a legal system for the protection of the archaeological heritage”, which shall contain the following provisions:
- “Maintain an inventory of its archaeological heritage and designate protected monuments and areas", which activities are allowed in a protected area are left to the States party;
- “Create archaeological reserves" designating zoning areas, in which forms of land use, e.g. disturbance of the soil, and excavations are restricted and supervised by the relevant authorities; and
- Implement a "mandatory reporting to the competent authorities" for a finder of a "chance discovery of elements of the archaeological heritage".

=== Article 3 ===
Whether on public or private land, each Party agrees to establish a certain code of conduct of archaeological work and preservation methods. Article 3, paragraph i states that each Party needs to implement a controlled procedure of archaeological activities preventing “any illicit excavation or removal of elements of the archaeological heritage” and assuring that archaeological resource management is applied in a scientific way. That principle includes that every investigation shall be as minimal as possible in its impact and uncovered findings are proper conserved during or after excavation. Excavations must be under the control of qualified, specially authorised persons (see Art. 3, para ii). In addition, "the use of metal detectors and any other detection equipment must be subject to specific prior authorization" (see Art. 3, para ii). Otherwise the arbitrary use of such equipment leads to destruction of context by digging up anything that the machine registers without knowing what it actually is.

== Integrated conservation of the archaeological heritage ==
Article 5 deals with the relationship between the preservation of archaeological heritage and development projects. Each Party agrees to involve archaeologists in the complete planning policy (Art. 5, para. i). For example, archaeological sites and their settings shall be considered if environmental impact assessments are required (Art. 5, para. vi).

It is essential that "archaeologists, town and regional planners systematically consult one another" (Art. 5, para. iii) to modify development plans that may have an adverse effect on archaeological heritage (para. iv), saving a considerable amount of time and money. The consultation process can only be successful, if the State parties make "relevant surveys, inventories and maps of archaeological sites" (Art. 7, para. i) available.

Though damage will be caused to some archaeological heritage, important projects are implemented anyway. In that case, emergency excavations should be carried out; and it is necessary that States ensure "sufficient time and resources for an appropriate scientific study of the site" and the publication of its findings are allocated. Article 6 of the revised Convention gives details about the source of funds for archaeological research and rescue archaeology.

If excavation works discover elements of archaeological heritage during a project, Article 5, paragraph vii makes provisions for “conservation in situ when feasible". However, that paragraph does not say how this will be done. An option may be to excavate the site and conserve the remains with soil or a special covering afterwards, so that the construction can occur on top of it. The site and its elements are thus partially or fully available for potential investigations in the future.

== Financing of archaeological research and conservation ==
States are required to arrange public, either on local, regional or national level, financial support for archaeological research. In addition, and that is important, the actor, either public or private, who is responsible for the concerning development project, has the obligation to allocate funding of any necessary related archaeological activities, such as rescue excavations (Art. 6, para. ii). This means, that public or private development plans should provide funds in the budget for archaeological survey work and full recording and publication of the findings in the same way that provision is made for environmental impact studies (Art. 6, para. ii b).

== Control of the application of the (revised) Convention ==
As compliance mechanism the Committee of Ministers of the Council of Europe set up a committee of experts to monitor the implementation and application of the revised Convention (Art. 13). This monitoring includes: periodic reports on the situation of archaeological heritage protection policies and the realisation of the Convention’s principles in the States (Art. 13, para. i). The reports and any other recommendations or proposals are directed to the Committee of Ministers of the Council of Europe. Furthermore, the committee of experts may propose measures to improve the implementation of the revised Convention by recommendations for amendments, multilateral activities, informing the public (Art. 13, para. ii), or invitations to other States to accede to this Convention (Art. 13, para. iii).

== Signatures and ratifications ==
Every State party that is consent to be bound by an international treaty needs to follow a procedure so the treaty can come into effect on the national and international level:

- Signature
- Ratification/Acceptance/Approval
- Deposition of the Ratification Document
- Entry into Force

The European Convention on the Protection of the Archaeological Heritage (revised) is "open for signature by the member States of the Council of Europe and the other States party to the European Cultural Convention. It is subject to ratification, acceptance or approval" (Art. 14, para. 1).

Before or simultaneously depositing the ratification to the revised Convention, the State party must denounce The European Convention on the Protection of the Archaeological Heritage of 1969 (Art. 14, para. 2).

The revised Convention shall enter into force six months after the date of the deposit of the instrument of ratification by any signatory State (Art. 14, para. 5). In the process of signing or ratifying the treaty, States may specify/limit the territory to which this revised Convention shall apply (Art. 16). Every State party can denounce the revised Convention by notification to the Secretary General of the Council of Europe (Art. 17).

As of 2018, the convention has been ratified by 46 states, which includes 44 Council of Europe member states plus the Holy See. The last signatory to ratify the convention was Luxembourg in 2017. The two Council of Europe states that have not signed or ratified the convention are Iceland and Montenegro.

== See also ==
- Archaeology
- Archaeological culture
- Archaeological field survey
- Council of Europe
- Cultural resources management
- Cultural Heritage Management
- ICOMOS
- Rescue archaeology
