= Pratishtha Raut =

British model

- प्रतिष्ठा राउत
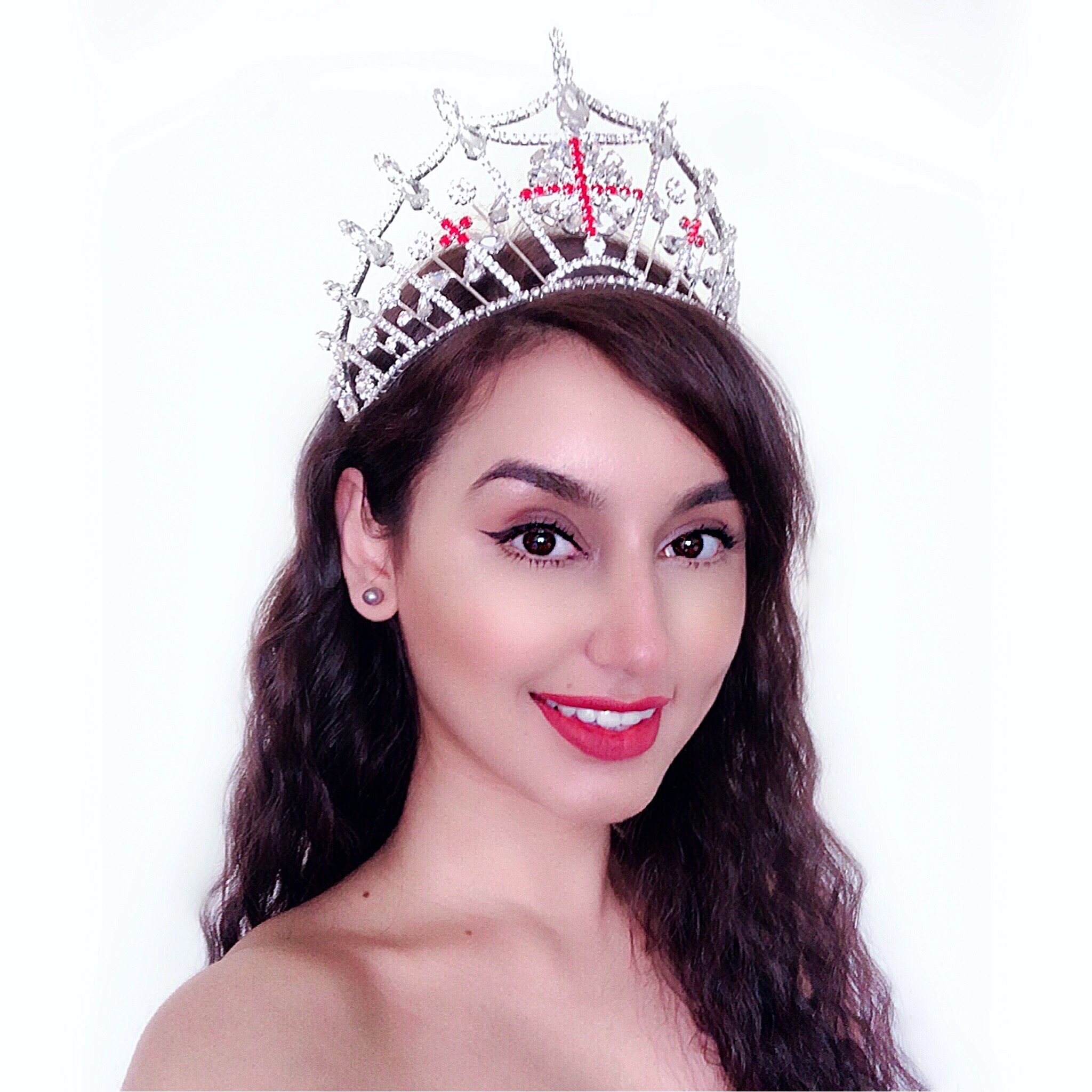
- Raut in 2020
- Pronunciation: /prə'tɪʃdə/
- Other name: Trish
- Occupation: Model
- Height: 1.70 m (5 ft 7 in)
- Beauty pageant titleholder
- Title: Miss England 2019; (Miss England 2nd Runner Up); (Beauty With A Purpose); (Miss Public Choice); (Miss Charity Queen)
- Major competitions: Miss England 2019 (2nd Runner Up); Miss Universe Great Britain 2020 (Withdrawn)

Pratishtha Raut (Nepali: प्रतिष्ठा राउत; born 19 March 1993) also widely known as Trish, is a British beauty pageant title holder who won the title Miss England 2019/20 2nd Runner Up which makes her the first British-Nepali origin beauty queen to hold the highest title among the Nepalese Community in the United Kingdom.

== Early life and family background ==
Raut was born in Kowloon, Hong Kong and raised in England. She is of Nepali origin.

== Personal life ==
Raut started modelling at the age of 16 as a hobby but chose to focus on her studies more. Due to her moving to different countries and cities, Pratishtha can speak three languages fluently - English, Nepali and Hindi making her trilingual.

== Pageantry ==
Miss England 2019/20 was her first pageant she entered with the intention of having a platform for raising awareness of Mental Health. She was the crowd's favourite since the beginning of the pageant. She had an outstanding performance in every round on the basis of which the panel of jury handed over the title of Beauty With A Purpose. She also won the titles of Miss Public's Choice and Miss Charity Queen in which she raised £9,999 for varies charities by holding a charity dinner attended by 300 guests which made her the top fundraiser. She won Miss England 2019/20 as the 2nd Runner Up in the competition at The Newbridge Hotel on 1 August 2019.

Raut was also a finalist at Miss Universe Great Britain 2020 but decided to withdraw from the competition due to the pandemic.

== Advocacy ==
Raut is an advocate for mental health. She mentions in one of her interviews that "There is a lot to take in as an immigrant because of clash in culture and crisis in identity but the support system for this seems to be lacking in our community. This needs to change and change fast because it will not only ruin lives of old and young but also create social instability for immigrants in the UK." She raised £9,999 for charities in 2019.
