= Riverfront Arts Centre =

Riverfront Theatre and Arts Centre
- Canolfan Theatr a Chelfyddydau Glan-yr-Afon
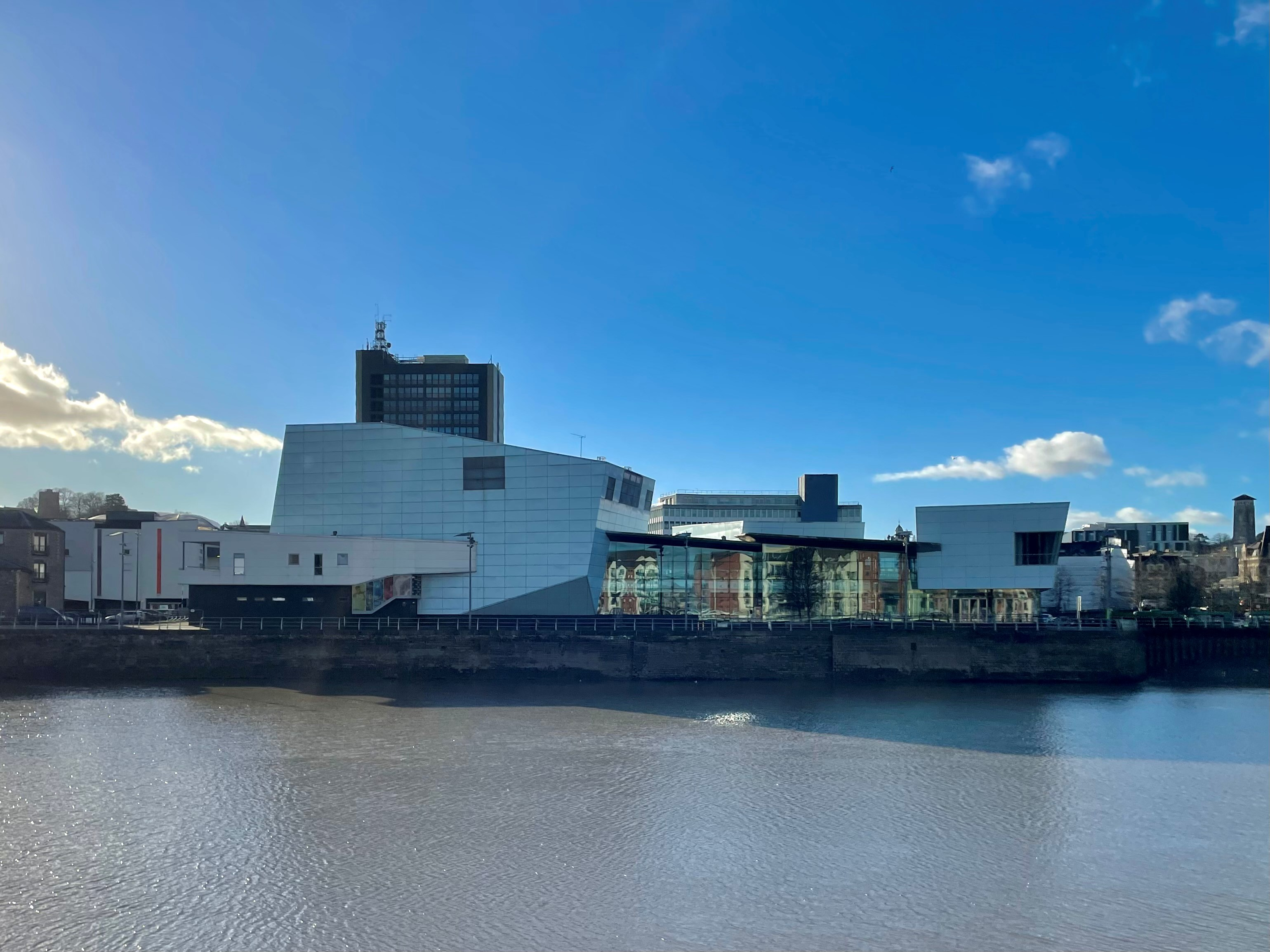
- Photographed from the east side of the River Usk
- Interactive map of the Riverfront Theatre and Arts Centre area

General information
- Type: Arts centre
- Architectural style: Deconstructivism
- Location: Newport city centre, Kingsway, NP20 1HG, Newport, Wales
- Coordinates: 51.58832°N 2.99343°W
- Opened: 22 October 2004; 21 years ago
- Cost: £15,000,000
- Operator: Newport Live

Technical details
- Floor count: 4

Design and construction
- Main contractor: Richard Jones
- Awards: Welsh Building of the Year, 2005; Welsh Building of the Year, 2006

Other information
- Public transit: Newport railway station Newport bus station

Website
- newportlive.co.uk/en/venues/riverfront/

The Riverfront (Welsh: Glan yr Afon) is the principal and newest theatre and arts centre in the City of Newport. It is located on the west bank of the River Usk on the Bristol Packet Wharf in the city centre. Designed by architectural firm Austin-Smith:Lord, the centre was opened on 23 October 2004.

== Background ==
Plans were discussed for a theatre as early as 1995 but was delayed due to the reorganisation of local authority finances.

Plans were ultimately made for the new arts centre at the same time as Newport made its bid for city status in 2002, at an estimated cost of £15 million. The centre was supported by Arts Council of Wales and National Assembly for Wales grant funding.

Construction began in May 2002, and took two years, partly delayed by the discovery of a medieval ship estimated to be 500 years old.

The Riverfront finally opened on 23 October 2004 with a concert by Katharine Jenkins and the Royal Philharmonic Orchestra.

The building's design was described as a celebration of deconstructivism in the style of Zaha Hadid, whose Cardiff Opera House design had recently been rejected nearby. The design proved polarising, winning the Welsh Building of the Year award two years in a row in 2005 and 2006, but also drawing scepticism from some local residents. In March 2004 the Riverfront came second in a public vote to find Wales' most ugly building.

On its 10th birthday in 2014 it was estimated that the centre was welcoming 90,000 visitors, twice the estimate made at the point of construction. At that point it was estimated to host 180 performances, 550 workshops and 110 film screenings each year.

In 2020 the theatre received Arts Council of Wales and National Lottery stabilisation funding to manage during the COVID-19 outbreak and upgrade its ticketing systems.

== Facilities ==
The venue opened with a 482-capacity theatre which went on to present a mix of comedy, opera, dance, music and drama. The Studio, seating 128, with a more challenging performance and film programme. The three workshop spaces host a range of art classes and workshops including ceramics and life drawing. The Dance Studio hosts a variety of dance and theatre classes and workshops including salsa, breakdancing, circus skills and youth theatre. The Recording Studio is hired externally and used for rock & pop and DJing workshops.

The centre has hosted visiting events from time to time, including BBC One's Question Time, filming for production of Doctor Who, and outside broadcasts of BBC Radio shows.

Every year since opening, The Riverfront has also put on traditional pantomimes over Christmas and New Year. Britain's Got Talent semi-finalist Mark James performed throughout the Christmas period as Jack Trott in Jack and the Beanstalk 2007 and Aladdin 2010.

In the 2010s it became the host of the annual Big Splash festival, attracting 20,000 visitors.

=== Art Gallery ===
The small art gallery plays host to a collection of local artists and other free exhibitions including photography, painting and sculpture.

The Basement Gallery is now being used for exhibitions and in 2008 hosted the Ghosts in Armour exhibition.

=== Food & beverages ===
The Riverfront has a café and bar overlooking the river on the ground floor of the building. There is also an outdoor terrace that spills onto the banks of the River Usk.

== The Newport Ship ==
The centre has been proposed as the home to the Newport Ship, a 15th-century vessel found immersed in the mud banks of the River Usk, although it has been suggested that the basement space may be too small to view the ship in its entirety.

The remains of the ship were discovered whilst excavating for the orchestra pit for the Theatre. Around 25 metres long and dating from 1465 the find's importance has been equated to that of the Mary Rose. During its six-month excavation, a vast new exhibition space was designed and built in self-compacting waterproof concrete beneath the foyer to house and display the discoveries, presenting the ship's unearthing, its history and eventually the fully conserved ship itself. The design could not however compromise the existing facilities. It had to be an integral part of the building and had to be constructed around the piles already in the ground.

The ship is currently in storage elsewhere and a decision is yet to be made regarding permanent public display.

== Gallery ==
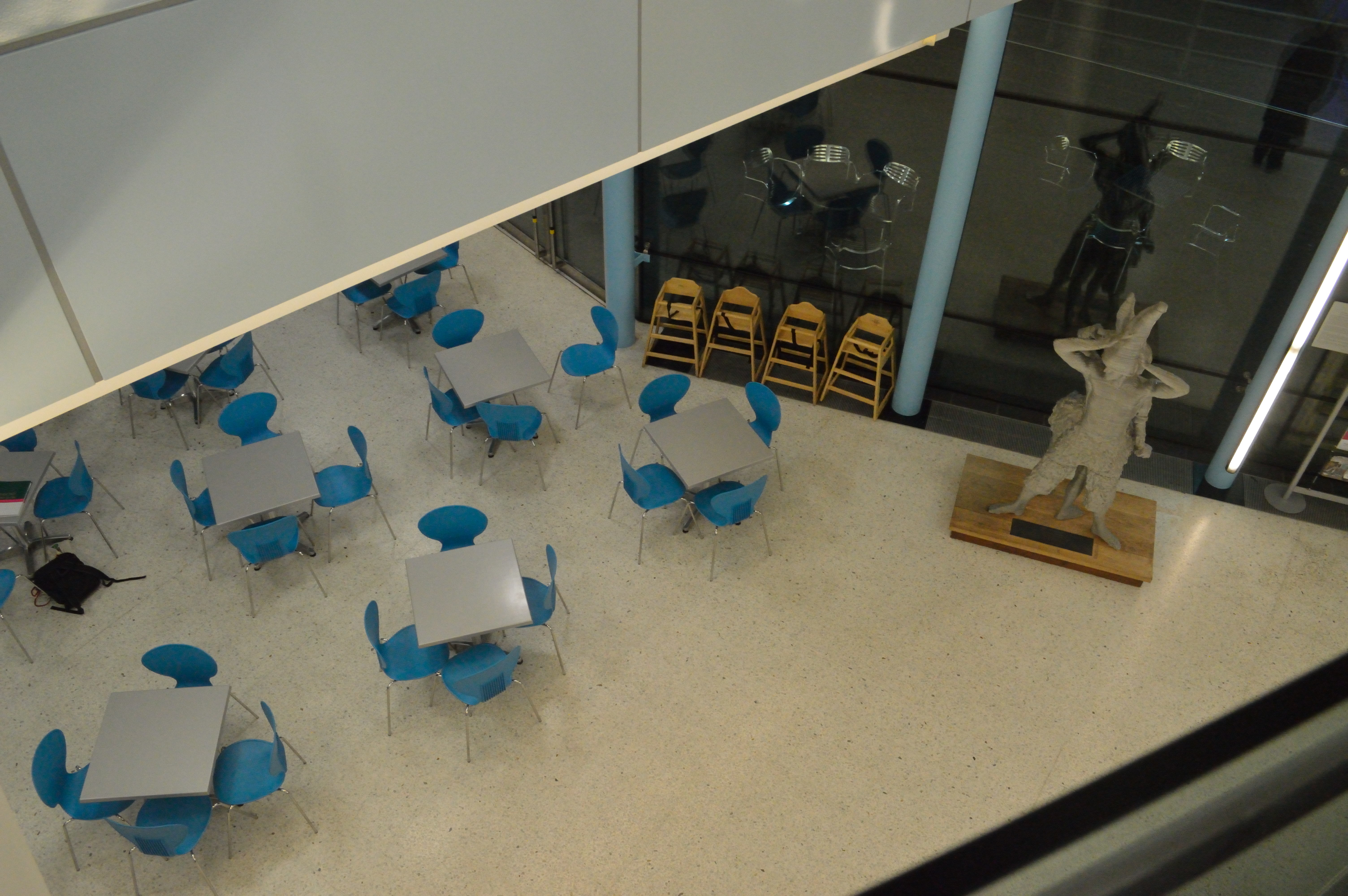
Café seating from above

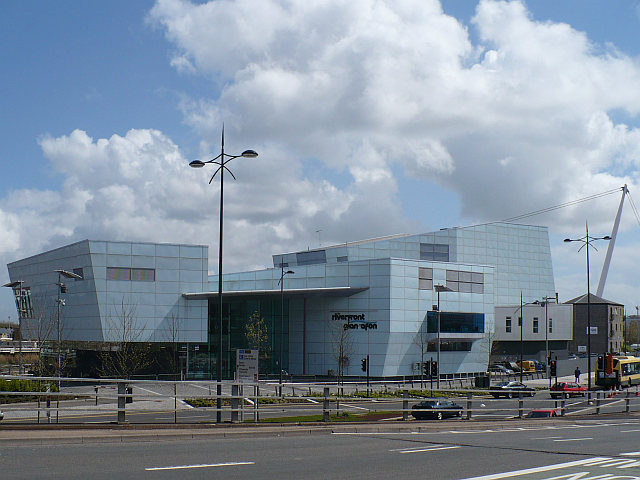
Centre entrance

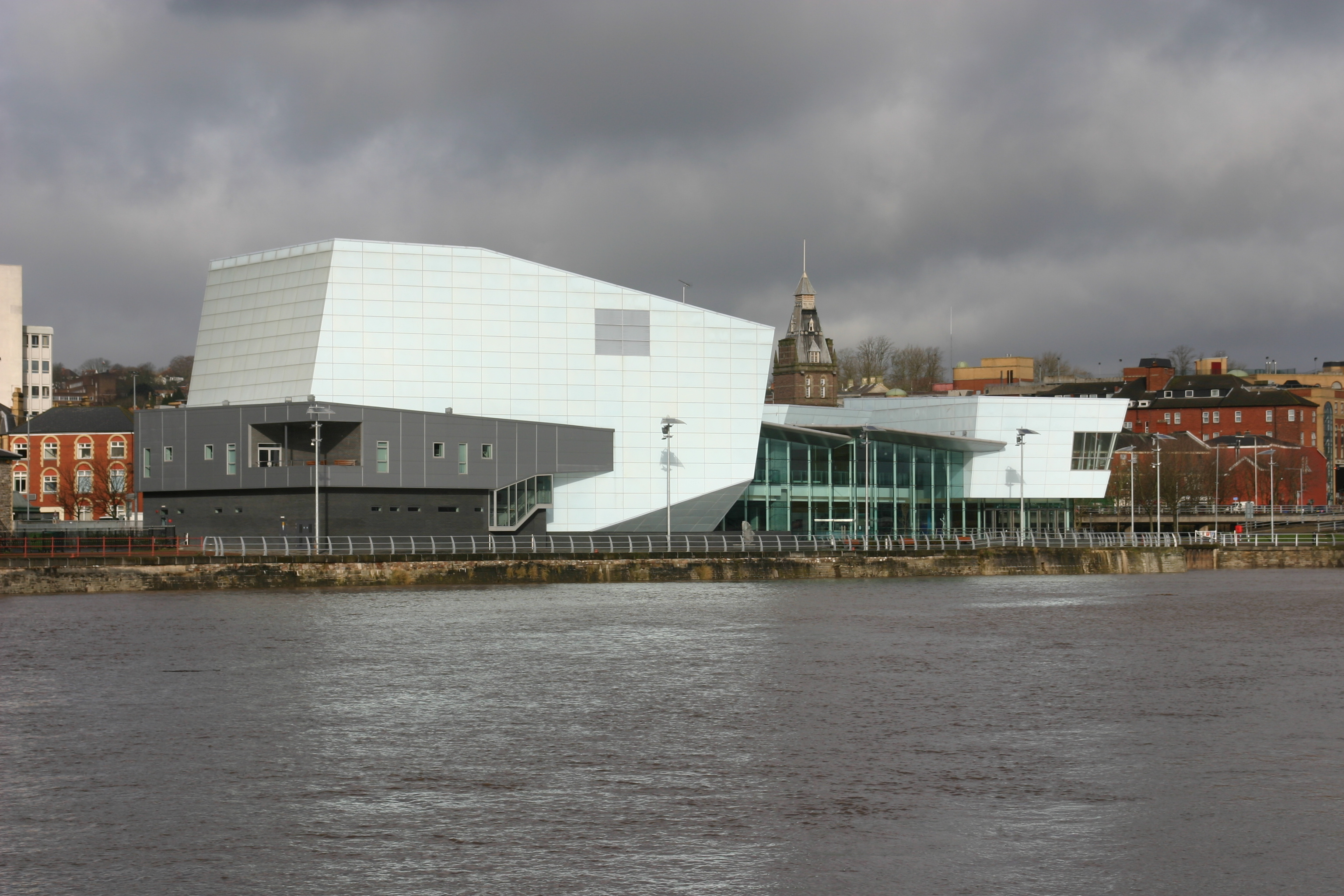
Viewed from the east
