= Miss Guatemala 2015 =

Beauty event

- Date: September 20, 2015
- Presenters: Cristian Zamora, Carina Velásquez
- Venue: Salon Azarea, Paseo Cayala, Guatemala City, Guatemala
- Broadcaster: Guatevisión
- Entrants: 12
- Winner: Jeimmy Aburto; Ciudad Capital

The 61st edition of the event Miss Guatemala for 2015, was held on September 20, 2015, in Hall Azarea, Paseo Cayalá in Guatemala City, Guatemala. 12 candidates Departments competed for the title. At the end of the event Ana Luisa Montufar, Miss Guatemala 2014, crowned Jeimmy Aburto of Capital City South as her successor.

The final evening was broadcast live by the National channel Guatemala. The final gala was led by Carina Velasquez and Cristian Zamora. The artists who enlivened the evening were the Guatemalan singer Danny Sanjosé and Mexican singer Alejandro Peniche.

== Winner and runners-up ==
Final Results	Contestant
Miss Guatemala 2015	Ciudad Capital - Jeimmy Aburto
Miss World Guatemala	Ciudad de Guatemala - María José Larrañaga
Miss International Guatemala	Chiquimula - Saida Jerónimo
1st runner-up	Ciudad Capital Norte - Leysly Juárez
2nd runner-up	Zacapa - Marilyn Grávez
3rd runner-up	Escuintla - Nadia Cano
