= Miss Grand Guatemala =

Beauty pageant title in Guatemala

- Formation: 2013
- Type: Beauty pageant
- Headquarters: Guatemala City
- Location: Guatemala
- Members: Miss Grand International
- Official language: Spanish
- National director: Alex Orellana
- Parent organization: Miss Guatemala Latina (2013, 2015 – 2016); Miss Guatemala (2017 – Present)

Miss Grand Guatemala is a national title bestowed upon a woman chosen to represent Guatemala at Miss Grand International. The title was first mentioned in 2013 when the winner of Miss Guatemala Latina 2013, Melanie Michelle Cohn Bech, was appointed by Oscar Flores, who served as the director of such a national pageant as well as the franchise holder of Miss Grand International in Guatemala. The license was transferred to another national pageant, Miss Guatemala, in 2017, and then to a queen maker, Alex Orellana, in 2019.

Since the first participation at Miss Grand International in 2013, no Miss Grand national pageant has been held individually to determine the representatives; all were either appointed or selected through other national pageants. The highest achievement of Guatemala at Miss Grand International is the second runner-up position, which was obtained by Ivana Batchelor in 2020.

== History ==
Guatemala has been participating in the Miss Grand International pageant since 2013. However, all of its representatives were either appointed or determined via other national pageants; no Miss Grand National was held separately to determine the titleholders. From 2013 to 2016, the license belonged to a capital-based national pageant chaired by Oscar Flores, Miss Guatemala Latina, in which Miss Grand Guatemala was considered one of the supplemental titles at such a pageant. In 2017, the license was then taken over by another national pageant, Miss Guatemala (Miss Universe Guatemala), and was then transferred to a queen maker, Alex Orellana, in 2019. However, all representatives during that period were appointed.

Guatemala's representative obtained placements at the Miss Grand International pageant twice, including the top 20 finalists in 2019, and the second runner-up and the Best National Costume award in 2020.

Gallery

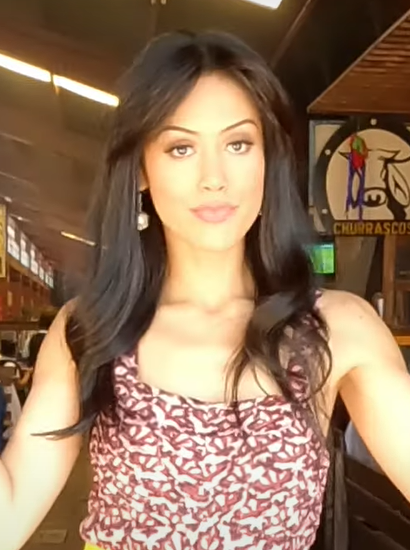
Miss Grand Guatemala 2021
María José Sazo

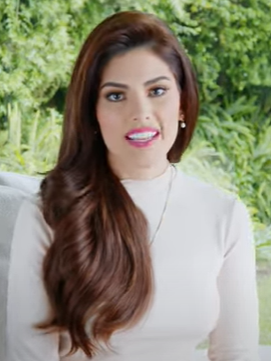
Miss Grand Guatemala 2022
Andrea Radford

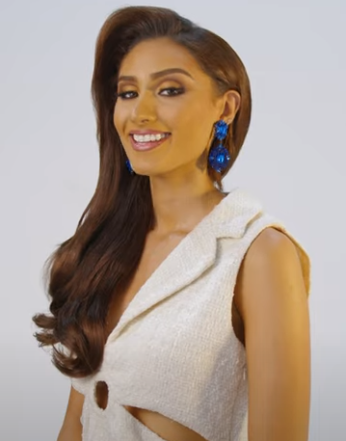
Miss Grand Guatemala 2023
Raschel Paz

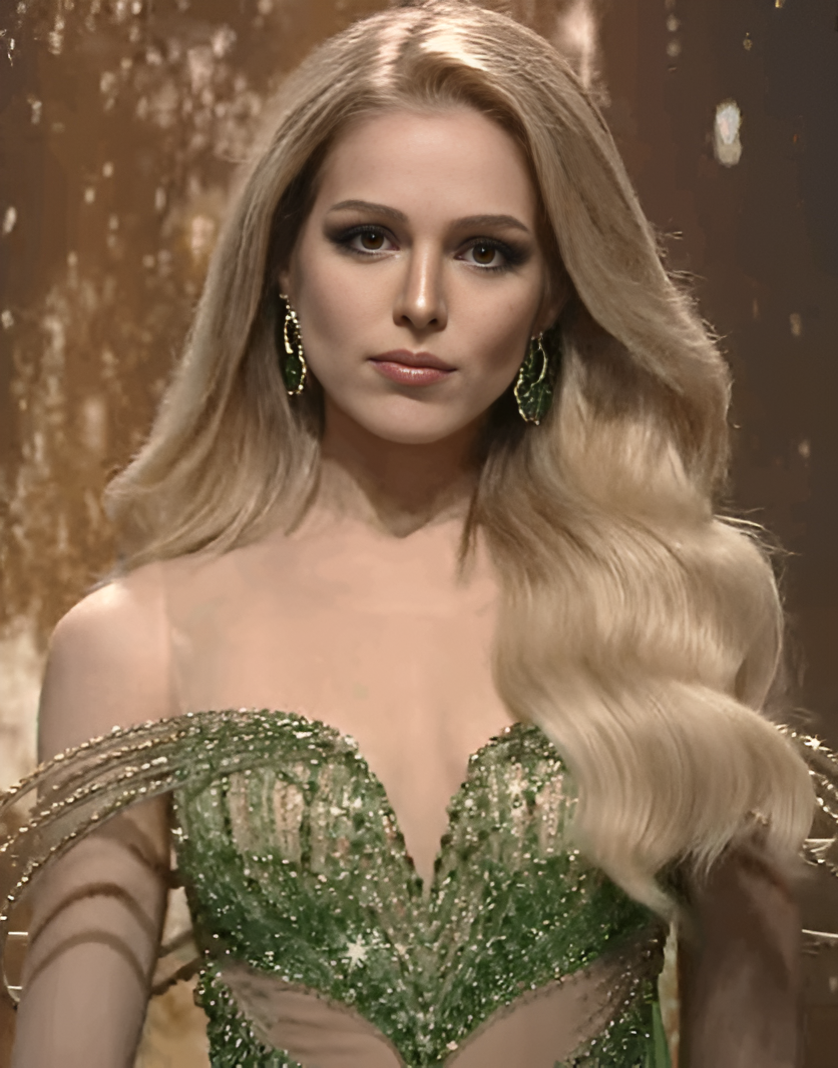
Miss Grand Guatemala 2024
Tokyo Gonzalo

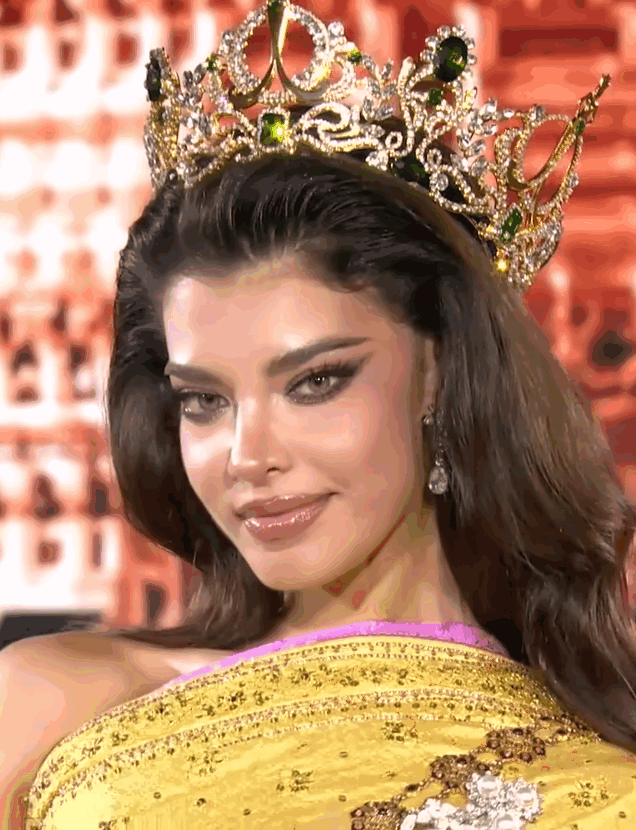
Miss Grand Guatemala 2025
Ana-Sofía Lendl

== International competition ==
The following is a list of Guatemalan representatives at the Miss Grand International contest.

Color keys

- : Declared as the winner
- : Ended as a runner-up (Top 5)
- : Ended as a finalist (Top 10)
- : Ended as a semifinalist (Top 20/21)
- : Ended as special awards winner

Year	Department	Miss Grand Guatemala	Title	Placement	Special Awards	National Director
2026	Guatemala	Ximena Carrillo	Miss Guatemala 2026 – Miss Grand Guatemala (Note: One of the main titles in the Miss Guatemala 2026 pageant.)	3rd Runner-up		Alex Orellana
2025	Guatemala USA	Ana-Sofía Lendl	Miss Guatemala 2025 – Miss Grand Guatemala (Note: One of the main titles in the Miss Guatemala 2025 pageant.)	5th Runner-up		Alex Orellana
2024	Sacatepéquez	Tokyo Gonzalo	Miss Guatemala 2024 – Miss Grand Guatemala (Note: One of the main titles in the Miss Guatemala 2024 pageant.)	Top 20		Alex Orellana
2023	Guatemala	Raschel Paz	Appointed	Unplaced		Alex Orellana
2022	Guatemala	Andrea Radford	Miss Supranational Guatemala 2019	Unplaced		Alex Orellana
2021	Escuintla	María José Sazó	Appointed	Unplaced		Alex Orellana
2020	Guatemala	Ivana Batchelor	Appointed	2nd runner-up	Best National Costume	Alex Orellana
2019	San Marcos	Dannia Guevara	2nd runner-up Reina Nacional de Independencia 2017	Top 20		Alex Orellana
2018	Guatemala	Raquel Maria Alejandra	Appointed	Did not compete		Carlos Garnica Paiz
2017	Guatemala	Alenjandra Castro	Miss United Continents Guatemala 2017 (Note: Supplemental title at the Miss Guatemala 2017 pageant.)	Unplaced		Carlos Garnica Paiz
2016	Jalapa	Susan Larios Cruz	Miss Grand Guatemala 2016 (Note: Supplementary title in the Miss Guatemala Latina 2016 pageant.)	Unplaced		Oscar Flores
2015	San Marcos	Analí Calderón	Miss Grand Guatemala 2015 (Note: Supplementary title in the Miss Guatemala Latina 2015 pageant)	Unplaced		Oscar Flores
Did not compete 2014
2013	Guatemala	Michelle Cohn	Miss Guatemala Latina 2013	Unplaced		Oscar Flores
