= Alize Lily Mounter =

British model (born 1988)

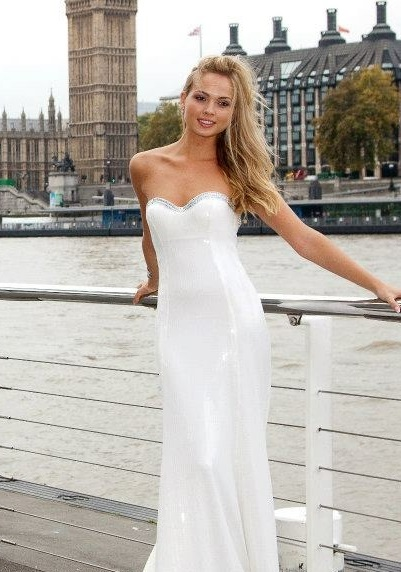
- Mounter in London
- Born: 29 September 1988 (age 38); Church Village, Wales
- Education: Roehampton University
- Height: 5 ft 11 in (1.80 m)
- Beauty pageant titleholder
- Title: Miss England 2011
- Major competitions: Miss England 2011 (Winner); Miss World 2011 (Top 7)
- Website: alizelilymounter.com

Alize Lily Mounter (born 29 September 1988) is a Welsh model and beauty queen who was crowned Miss England in 2011. She represented England at the 61st Miss World in London, where she made the Top 7 and was ranked 4th place overall. She received the titles of Miss World Europe, Miss United Kingdom and Miss World Beach Beauty. Later she represented the United Kingdom at Miss International on 21 October 2012 in Okinawa, Japan.

== Early life and education ==
Mounter was born in Church Village, South Wales, to a Welsh father and Hungarian mother.

Mounter moved to London after appearing as a finalist on Britain's Next Top Model. She then went on for further education and studied for a BA degree in Journalism and Drama at Roehampton University.

== Pageantry ==
=== Miss England ===
At the Miss England 2011, she represented Every Model magazine and won the title. She is the second Miss England winner of non-English heritage. She gained considerable media attention for being a Welsh, Miss England winner. She was allowed to participate in Miss England because she had been living in Kensington, London for several years before the competition.

During her time as Miss England she travelled to various countries promoting Miss England pageant. These countries included; France, Thailand, Mauritius, Mexico, Dubai, Gibraltar and Egypt. After her visit to Mauritius the Mauritius Tourism Promotion Authority then became the official sponsor of Miss England 2012. Mounter raised over £5,000 for Beauty with a Purpose and Help the Heroes and listed green issues as being very important in her life.

Mounter has also been the judge at several pageant shows including Miss Hampshire 2011 and Miss England Beach Beauty 2012.

=== Miss World ===
At Miss World 2011, she was awarded the winner of the Miss World Beach Beauty competition. She made the Top 7 (and was ranked 4th place overall) in the competition. She came 4th runner up in the Top Model round, and top 20 in Beauty with a Purpose. Mounter also received the Continental Queen of Beauty title as Miss World Europe for the highest ranked contestant in the European region.

In May 2012 Alize was invited by the Miss World chairman Julia Morley to accompany the organisation to Africa. They visited Ghana and Kenya to help promote Beauty with a Purpose humanitarian projects. She travelled with Miss World 2011 Ivian Sarcos of Venezuela, second runner up Amanda Vilanova of Puerto Rico and Mandla Mandela. On 3 June 2012 she was invited by the Miss World organisation to take part in the Thames Diamond Jubilee Pageant of Queen Elizabeth II in London.

Honorary titles
Preceded by (Republic of Ireland) Emma Britt Waldron	Miss World Europe; 2011	Succeeded by (Wales) Sophie Moulds
Preceded by Nicola Mimnagh	Miss United Kingdom; 2011	Succeeded by Sophie Moulds
Preceded by Jessica Linley	Miss England; 2011	Succeeded by Charlotte Holmes
