= Rogelia Cruz =

Guatemalan beauty queen and guerilla

- Born: 31 August 1941; Guatemala City, Guatemala
- Died: 11 January 1968 (aged 27); Escuintla, Guatemala
- Cause of death: Murder
- Parent(s): Miguel Cruz; Blanca Martinez
- Beauty pageant titleholder
- Title: Miss Guatemala 1959
- Major competitions: Miss Guatemala 1959 (Winner); Miss Universe 1959 (Unplaced)

Rogelia Cruz Martínez (31 August 1941 – 11 January 1968) was a Guatemalan beauty pageant titleholder and left-wing political activist. After she won the 1959 Miss Guatemala, she joined the Guatemalan Party of Labour and became romantically involved with its leader, Leonardo Castillo Johnson. She was ultimately kidnapped and murdered for her association with the party and Johnson.

== Biography ==
=== Early life and pageantry ===
Cruz was born into a middle-class family in Guatemala City on 31 August 1941, the daughter of Miguel Ángel Cruz Franco and Blanca Martínez Flores. While born in the Guatemalan capital, her family was originally from Chiquimula. As a young adult, attended the Instituto Normal Central para Señoritas Belén, a secondary school that specializes in training future teachers, and went onto study architecture at the Universidad de San Carlos de Guatemala. It was during her time at university that she won the Miss Guatemala pageant. She went onto compete in the Miss Universe pageant in Long Beach, California the following year in 1959, but ultimately lost the title to Akiko Kojima of Japan. Following her success in pageantry, in 1962, Cruz was persecuted by the Guatemalan Government, due to her activism and opposition to the dictatorship of Miguel Ydígoras Fuentes, and joined a guerrilla front.

=== Guatemalan Party of Labor and guerrilla activity ===
In 1965, she was arrested for storing weapons at her family's farm. After being released from prison, she joined the Juventud Patriotica del Trabajo (JPT) and became romantically involved with Leonardo Castillo Johnson, the leader of the Partido Guatemalteco del Trabajo (PGT).

=== Murder ===
Cruz was arrested following a traffic violation but was released after the PGT and Fuerzas Armadas Rebeldes (FAR) made threats towards the judge presiding over her case. Shortly after her release, she was kidnapped and then, on 11 January 1968, her body was found, naked, with signs of torture and sexual assault, at the foot of a bridge near Escuintla. She was murdered by the paramilitary far-right supporters of the Ydigoras Fuentes dictatorship known as "The White Hand", due to her activism and her association with the PGT.

=== Aftermath ===
In retaliation for her murder, the PGT attacked a vehicle of US military personnel a few days later, killing two men and wounding a third, and the Guatemalan military subsequently assassinated Castillo Johnson in response.
