= Isel Suñiga =

Guatemalan beauty queen and politician (born 1994)

Isel Suñiga Morfín

Mayor of Ayutla
- Incumbent
- Assumed office 15 January 2024
- Deputy: Rubén Morales
- Preceded by: Rubén Méndez

Personal details
- Born: Isel Aneli Suñiga Morfín; 7 September 1994 (age 32) San Marcos, Guatemala
- Party: Independent
- Height: 1.75 m (5 ft 9 in)
- Beauty pageant titleholder
- Title: Miss Guatemala 2017
- Hair color: Black
- Eye color: Brown
- Major competitions: Miss Guatemala 2017 (Winner); Miss Universe 2017 (Unplaced)

Isel Aneli Suñiga Morfín (born 7 September 1994) is a Guatemalan politician and beauty pageant titleholder who won Miss Guatemala 2017. She represented Guatemala at the Miss Universe 2017.

== Pageantry ==
=== Miss Guatemala 2017 ===
Suñiga was crowned Miss Guatemala 2017 and then competed at Miss Universe 2017 in Las Vegas.

=== Miss Universe 2017 ===
Suñiga represented Guatemala at Miss Universe 2017 but Unplaced.

Awards and achievements
Preceded by Virginia Argueta	Miss Guatemala; 2017	Succeeded by Mariana García
