= Miss England =

Beauty pageant

- Formation: 1928; 98 years ago
- Type: Beauty pageant
- Headquarters: Leicester
- Location: England
- Members: Miss World; Miss Cosmo
- Official language: English
- Website: missengland.info

Miss England is a national beauty pageant in England.

== History ==
The contest, the title of which is owned by the Miss World organisation, is organised each year by Angie Beasley. A winner of 25 beauty contests in the 1980s, she has organised beauty pageants around the UK on behalf of Miss World, including Miss United Kingdom, Miss England, Miss Scotland and Miss Wales.

The contest often attracts celebrity judges at local and national finals. Many celebrities have also judged the regional heats for the competition around the country.

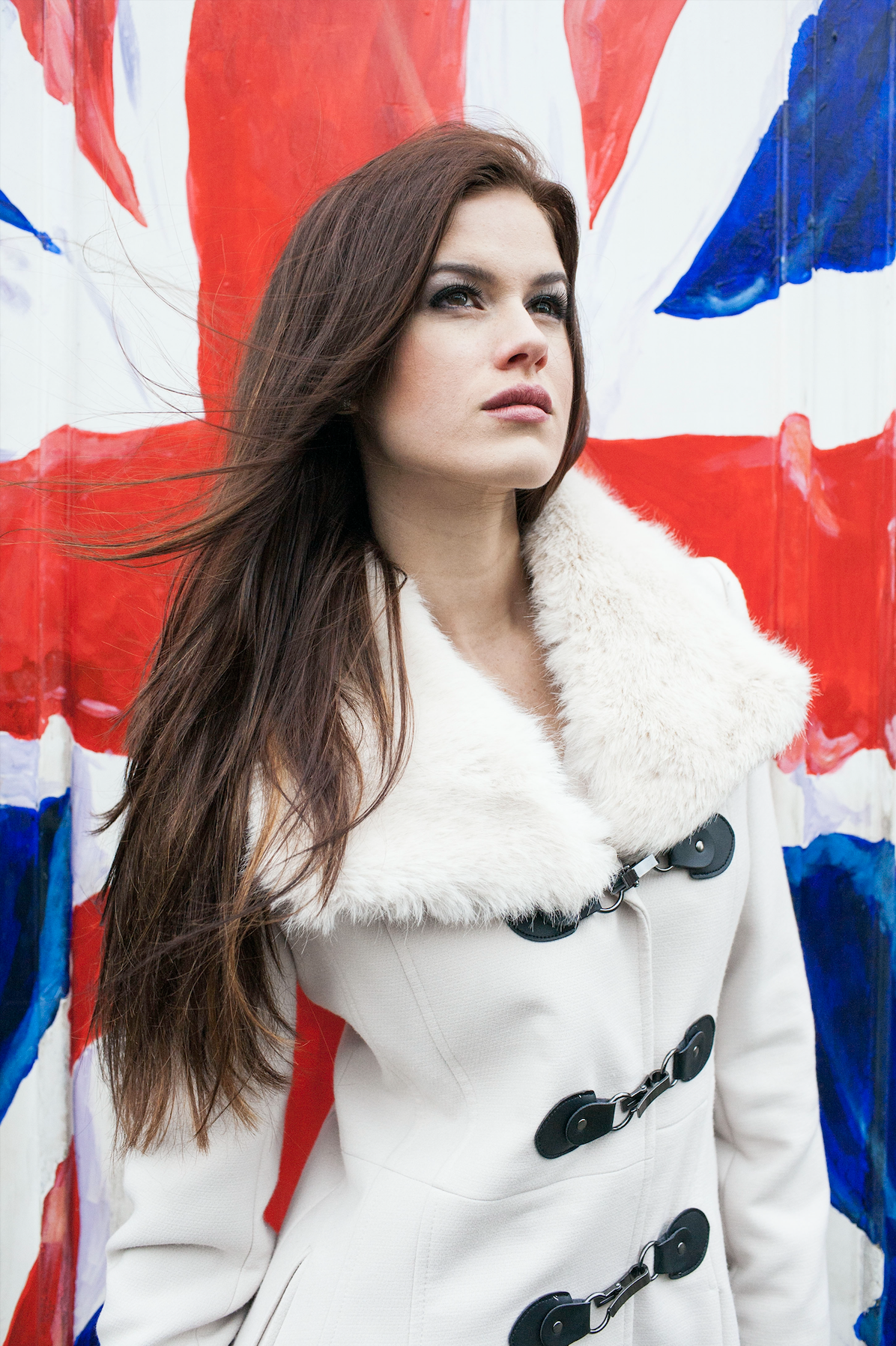
Carina Tyrrell, Miss England 2014

The Miss England competition is promoted to potential entrants in the local media through a series of area heats held around England.

The News of the World newspaper and Take a Break magazine have sponsored contestants, writing features on them and putting the winners on the front covers. Various newspapers, including the Daily Mirror, The Times, the Daily Mail and various magazines including Teen Vogue in New York and Hello! have carried stories on local and national winners.

The winner of the Miss England competition, along with the winners of Miss Northern Ireland, Miss Scotland and Miss Wales, are eligible to compete in Miss World. The highest ranking competitor of the four constituent country entrants is then presented with the title and crown of Miss United Kingdom.

The 2008 contest featured a plus-size model, Chloe Marshall and an active-duty member of the British Army, Katrina Hodge, both firsts for the pageant.

In 2022 Melisa Raouf became the first contestant to compete in a semi final of the contest without makeup, following the introduction of a "bare-face top model" round in 2019.

== Winners ==
The title of Miss England 2011 was won by Alize Lily Mounter who was classed as the favourite to win the competition. Mounter would later compete in the Miss World 2011 where she was among the top seven contestants on the final night, finishing in 4th place. She was also awarded the title of Miss World Europe, a first for England, after finishing as the highest ranked delegate from Europe in the competition.

Carina Tyrrell, who was a medical student when she won her national title in 2014, competed in Miss World 2014 when the competition was held in her home country at ExCeL London. She would make the final cut and enter the top 5, also finishing in 4th place overall.

In 2017, Stephanie Hill represented England at the Miss World 2017 held in Sanya, China and became the first English delegate to make the top 3 in the competition by placing as the 2nd runner-up. Hill was also awarded the title of Miss World Europe after being the European contestant with the highest scores. This result makes Hill the most successful Miss England in the history of Miss World.

Rehema Muthamia, who represented England at the Miss World 2021 competition, was the first Miss England, and contestant from Europe, to win the Beauty with a Purpose award; awarded to the contestant with the most relevant and important charity project in her nation.

In 2025, Grace Richardson became the first openly gay Miss England.

== Titleholders ==
=== 1928 to 1936 ===
Year	Miss England
1936	Laurence Atkins
1935	Muriel Oxford
1934	June Lammas
1933	Angela Ward
1932	Gwen Stallard
1931	Bettie Mason
1930	Marjorie Ross
1929	Benny Dicks
1928	Nonni Shields

=== 1953 to 1990 ===
After winning the title of Miss England, winners would participate in Miss Universe, followed by the occasional Miss Europe, and finally Miss United Kingdom. In the event whereby a Miss England won the title of Miss United Kingdom, she would represent the United Kingdom in Miss World.

Year	Miss England	City	Placement at Miss Universe	Special Award(s) at Miss Universe	Placement at Miss United Kingdom
1990	Carla Louise Barrow	Gibsmere	Unplaced		
1989	Racquel Marie Jory	Reading	Unplaced		1st runner-up
1988	Tracey Williams	Selston	Unplaced	Miss Photogenic	Did not compete
1987	Yvette Dawn Livesey	Whalley	Unplaced		
1987	Deborah Ann "Debbie" Pearman	Smethwick	Did not compete		
1986	Joanne Ruth Sedgley	St Austell	Unplaced		1st runner-up
1985	Helen Westlake	Bristol	Unplaced		Top 15
1984	Louise Gray	Chesterfield	Unplaced		Top 7
1983	Karen Lesley Moore	Southsea	4th runner-up		1st runner-up
1982	Della Frances Dolan	Grimsby	Top 12		Miss United Kingdom 1982
1981	Joanna Margaret Booth "Joanna Longley"	Windsor	Unplaced		Did not compete
1981	Suzanne Hughes	Morecambe	Did not compete		Top 7
1980	Julie Duckworth	Blackpool	Unplaced		2nd runner-up
1979	Carolyn Ann Seaward	Yelverton	2nd runner-up	Miss Photogenic	Miss United Kingdom 1979
1978	Beverley Isherwood	Bolton	Unplaced		2nd runner-up
1977	Sarah Louise Long	Bristol	Unplaced		2nd runner-up
1976	Pauline Davies	Lowton	Top 12	Miss Photogenic	
1975	Vicki Harris	Putney	Top 12		Miss United Kingdom 1975
1974	Kathleen Ann Celeste Anders	Rochdale	Top 12		1st runner-up
1973	Veronica Ann Cross	Peacehaven	Unplaced		Miss United Kingdom 1973
1972	Jennifer Mary McAdam	Maghull	4th runner-up		Miss United Kingdom 1972
1971	Marilyn Ann Ward	Southampton	Top 12		Miss United Kingdom 1971
1970	Yvonne Anne Ormes	Nantwich	Unplaced		Miss United Kingdom 1970
1969	Myra Van Heck	Petersfield	Unplaced		
1968	Jennifer Lowe Summers	Warrington	Top 15		Miss United Kingdom 1968
1967	Jennifer Lynn Lewis	Leicester	2nd runner-up		Miss United Kingdom 1967
1966	Janice Carol Whiteman	Southampton	Top 15		
1965	Jennifer Warren Gurley	Sale	Unplaced		
1964	Brenda Blacker	London	1st runner-up		
1963	Susan Pratt	Windsor	Withdrew		
1962	Margaret Yvonne Willey "Kim Carlton"	Haslemere	Top 15	Miss Photogenic; Best National Costume	
1961	Arlette Dobson	Weybridge	3rd runner-up		
1960	Joan Ellinor Boardman	Wallasey	Top 15		
1959	Pamela Ann Searle	Morden	3rd runner-up	Miss Photogenic	
1958	Dorothy Hazeldine	Rochdale	Unplaced		
1957	Sonia Hamilton	London	2nd runner-up		
1956	Iris Alice Kathleen Waller	Gateshead	3rd runner-up		Miss United Kingdom 1956
1955	Margaret Rowe	Berkhamsted	Top 15	Most Popular Girl in Parade	
1954	June Peters	Manchester	Did not compete		
1953	Marlene Ann Dee	Henley-on-Thames	Did not compete		

=== 2000–present ===
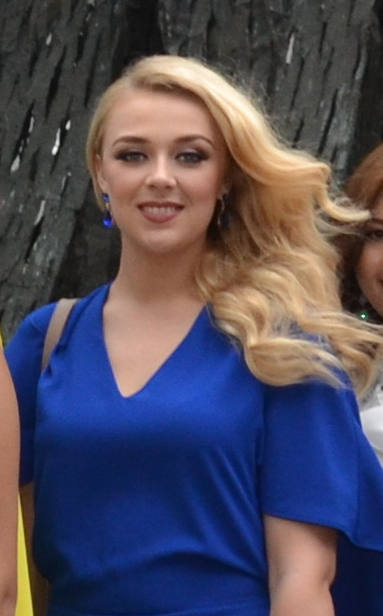
Stephanie Hill, Miss England 2017

Since 2000, winners of Miss England have been competing in Miss World.

Year	Miss England	City	Placement	Awards
2027	Tabitha Bennett	Lancashire	TBA	
2026	Grace Richardson	Leicester	Top 40	
2025	Charlotte Grant	Liverpool	Unplaced	
2025	Milla Magee	Cornwall	Did not compete	
2024	No competition held			
2023	Jessica Gagen	Skelmersdale	Top 8	Winner at Head-to-Head Challenge; Miss World Europe
2022	Due to the impact of COVID-19 pandemic, no pageant in 2022			
2021	Rehema Muthamia	London	Top 40	Beauty with a Purpose; Top 27 at Miss World Talent
2020	Due to the impact of COVID-19 pandemic, no pageant in 2020			
2019	Bhasha Mukherjee	Derby	Top 40	Top 32 at Miss World Sport
2018	Alisha Cowie	Newcastle	Unplaced	4th Runner-up Sanya Tourism Promotional Video Award
2017	Stephanie Hill	Sheffield	2nd Runner-up	Top 20 at Beauty with a Purpose; Top 8 at Multimedia; 3rd Runner-up at Miss World Talent
2016	Elizabeth Grant	Preston	Unplaced	Top 24 at Miss World Sport
2015	Natasha Hemmings	Cheshire	Unplaced	Top 13 at Miss World Talent
2014	Carina Tyrrell	Cambridge	Top 5	Top 10 at Beauty with a Purpose; Top 14 at Interview Scores; Top 5 at Multimedia; Top 32 at Miss World Sport
2013	Kirsty Heslewood	London	Top 10	Top 33 at Balinese Beach Fabric; Top 10 at Beauty with a Purpose; Top 10 at Interview Scores; Top 20 at Miss World Sport; Top 10 at Top Model
2012	Charlotte Holmes	Devon	Top 15	Top 10 at Beauty with a Purpose; Top 16 at Interview Scores; Top 24 at Miss World Sport; Top 46 at Top Model
2011	Alize Lily Mounter	London	Top 7	Winner of Beach Beauty; Top 20 at Beauty with a Purpose; Winner of Miss World Europe; 4th Runner-up at Top Model
2010	Jessica Linley	Mansfield	Unplaced	
2009	Katrina Hodge	Royal Tunbridge Wells	Unplaced	
2009	Rachel Christie	London	Resigned	
2008	Laura Coleman	Derby	Unplaced	
2007	Georgia Horsley	York	Unplaced	Top 18 at Miss World Talent
2006	Eleanor Glynn	Oxford	Unplaced	
2005	Hammasa Kohistani	London	Unplaced	
2004	Danielle Lloyd	Liverpool	Unplaced	
2003	Jackie Turner	Poole	Unplaced	
2002	Danielle Luan	Oxford	Unplaced	
2001	Sally Kettle	Leicester	Unplaced	
2000	Michelle Walker	Liverpool	Unplaced	

== See also ==
- Miss Northern Ireland
- Miss Scotland
- Miss United Kingdom
- Miss Wales
- Miss Universe Great Britain
- Miss Great Britain
