= Kirsty Heslewood =

British model and beauty pageant titleholder

Kirsty Heslewood (born 1991) is a British model, television personality, and beauty pageant titleholder who was crowned Miss England 2013. She represented England at Miss World 2013 in London.

== Early life and career ==
Heslewood grew up in Southend-on-Sea, Essex, and began modelling in her teens.

== Pageantry ==
Heslewood won the Miss England title in June 2014 after placing as a finalist in the 2013 competition. As Miss England, she advocated for mental health awareness and partnered with charities such as Beat Bullying. At Miss World 2013, she performed a contemporary dance routine for the talent competition.

Honorary titles
Preceded by Sophie Moulds	Miss United Kingdom; 2013	Succeeded by Carina Tyrrell
