= Artursson =

Artursson is a surname. Notable people with the surname include:

- Greger Artursson (born 1972), Swedish ice hockey player
- Nicoline Artursson (born 1993), Swedish fashion model
