= Authentic TV =

Authentic.tv
History
- Launched: 21 January 2005
- Closed: 3 April 2005

Authentic TV was a short-lived television home shopping channel in the United Kingdom. It began broadcasting on Sky Digital on 21 January 2005 and ceased broadcasting on 1 September 2005.

== Channel History ==
Authentic TV was the brainchild of Collectibles Guru, Gary Ashburn a leading Collectibles expert who had successfully appeared for many years on QVC and Ideal World TV Home Shopping Channels in the UK. It was conceived by Gary and his long-term partner, Paul Lavers, as a channel where people could purchase exclusive collectibles, memorabilia and limited editions. Examples of the products on offer included Sports Memorabilia, Rock 'n' Roll Music, Film and TV Memorabilia. The launch team presenters included shopping TV veteran Chloe Marshall and Nikki Vincent.

Without having its own studios, post-production suites, call centres and offices, Authentic TV operated as a virtual channel, and the Sky EPG and Ofcom licence were leased from another channel service provider. The project was not proven as a success due to Sky EPG's crowded shopping listings and was listed in a section separate from all other shopping channels. It also underestimated the "stack-em high" sell it's philosophy of traditional direct response marketing.
