= Miss Guatemala 2009 =

- Date: May 25, 2009
- Venue: Auditorio Nacional, Guatemala City, Guatemala
- Broadcaster: Guatevisión
- Entrants: 24
- Winner: Lourdes Elisa Figueroa Araujo; Ciudad Capital

The Miss Guatemala 2009 pageant was held on May 25, 2009 at Auditorio Nacionalin the capital city Guatemala City, Guatemala. This year only 24 candidates were competing for the national crown. The chosen winner will represent Guatemala at the Miss Universe 2009 and at Miss Continente Americano 2009. The winner of best national costume, the costume will be use in Miss Universe 2009. Miss World Guatemala will represent Guatemala at the Miss World 2009. Miss Guatemala Internacional will represent Guatemala at the Miss International 2009. The First Runner-Up will enter Miss Intercontinental 2009 and the Second Runner-Up will enter Top Model of the World 2009. The Top 10 Semifinalists entered Reina Internacional del Café 2009, Reina Hispanoamericana 2009, Reina Mundial del Banano 2009, Miss Globe International 2009, and Miss Tourism International 2009.

== Final results ==
Final results	Contestant
Miss Guatemala 2009	Ciudad Capital - Lourdes Figueroa
Miss World Guatemala	San Marcos - Angélica Guevara
Miss Guatemala Internacional	Chiquimula - Ivanna Bonilla
First Runner-Up	Totonicapán - Nilda Tumax
Second Runner-Up	USA Guatemala - Jessana Paté
Semifinalists	Alta Verapaz - Alejandra Soria; Chimaltenango - Emely López; Departamento Guatemala - Melanie Aranky; Escuintla - Cindy Samayoa; Zacapa - Claudia León

=== Special awards ===
- Miss Photogenic – Lourdes Figueroa (Ciudad Capital)
- Miss Congeniality (voted by the candidates) – Jessica Arévalo (Progreso)
- Best National Costume – Lourdes Figueroa (Ciudad Capital)

== Official Delegates ==
Represent	Contestant	Age	Height	Hometown
Alta Verapaz	María Alejandra Soria Figueroa	23	1.73 m (5 ft 8 in)	Cobán
Baja Verapaz	Andrea Reyona Torres	18	1.74 m (5 ft 8 1/2 in)	Salamá
Chimaltenango	Emely Joan López López	22	1.70 m (5 ft 7 in)	Chimaltenango
Chiquimula	Ivanna María Bonilla Oliva	19	1.75 m (5 ft 9 in)	Esquipulas
Ciudad Capital	Lourdes Elisa Figueroa Araujo	20	1.79 m (5 ft 10 1/2 in)	Ciudad Guatemala
Departamento Guatemala	Melanie Fawcia Aranky Herrera	23	1.83 m (6 ft 0 in)	Ciudad Guatemala
Escuintla	Cindy Eugenia Samayoa González	19	1.72 m (5 ft 7 1/2 in)	Puerto San José
Huehuetenango	Mariel Eugenia Saucedo García	26	1.71 m (5 ft 7 1/2 in)	Jacaltenango
Izabal	Emileny Morales Villanueva	24	1.73 m (5 ft 8 in)	Puerto Barrios
Jalapa	Karina Vera Querenillos	25	1.69 m (5 ft 6 1/2 in)	Jalapa
Jutiapa	Guadalupe Xavier Fernández	18	1.70 m (5 ft 7 in)	Asunción Mita
Petén	Karleny Morfín Sarceño	24	1.72 m (5 ft 7 1/2 in)	Flores
Progreso	Jésica Arévalo Estrada	23	1.75 m (5 ft 9 in)	Sanarate
Quetzaltenango	Liliana de Rodríguez Ica	20	1.70 m (5 ft 7 in)	Quetzaltenango
Quiché	Aurora Eros Vlecker	20	1.79 m (5 ft 10 1/2 in)	Chichicastenango
Retalhuleu	Xiomara Germán McDoughnah	23	1.80 m (5 ft 11 in)	Retalhuleu
Sacatepéquez	Andrea Novella Noack	23	1.76 m (5 ft 9 1/2 in)	Ciudad Vieja
San Marcos	Sonia Angélica Guevara Morfín	22	1.77 m (5 ft 9 1/2 in)	Comitancillo
Santa Rosa	Luisa María Castillo Valiente	18	1.72 m (5 ft 7 1/2 in)	Barberena
Sololá	Annellisse Solórzano De León	22	1.70 m (5 ft 7 in)	Sololá
Suchitepéquez	Kimberly del Carmen David Aguilar	20	1.74 m (5 ft 8 1/2 in)	Chicacao
Totonicapán	Nilda Alejandra Tumax Chiroy	26	1.75 m (5 ft 9 in)	San Francisco El Alto
USA Guatemala	Jessana Elena Paté Rabatú	22	1.79 m (5 ft 10 1/2 in)	Charlotte
Zacapa	Claudia Lorena León Morales	24	1.77 m (5 ft 9 1/2 in)	Zacapa
