= Michelle Cohn =

Guatemalan beauty pageant titleholder (born 1995)

Michelle Cohn Bech
- Born: Melanie Michelle Cohn Beck; Guatemala City, Guatemala
- Education: Galileo University
- Children: 2
- Beauty pageant titleholder
- Title: Miss Guatemala 2023
- Major competitions: Miss Grand International 2013 (Unplaced); Miss Guatemala 2023 (Winner); Miss Universe 2023 (Unplaced)

Melanie Michelle Cohn Bech is a Guatemalan beauty pageant titleholder who was crowned Miss Guatemala 2023 and represented her country at Miss Universe 2023, held in El Salvador.

== Biography ==
Born in Guatemala City, Cohn is the daughter of an English father and a Guatemalan mother. She graduated from Galileo University, where she obtained a degree in public image and media. She is a model, television presenter and also does philanthropic work through her beach clothing venture.

Asked about her most difficult time as a model, she says that she has not had any. However, she says that when people judge her for how she looks, and at times say that she does not look Guatemalan, then "I've felt a little bad because I'm 100% Guatemalan, so I don't know how to sometimes explain to people that this is a multicultural country and that we don't all look the same and that that's the beauty of society."

== Beauty pageants ==
Cohn won Miss Grand Guatemala 2013, as well as Miss Guatemala Latina 2013, and then represented her country at Miss Latin America in the Dominican Republic, where she reached the top five.

=== Miss Guatemala 2023 ===
On August 10, 2023, Cohn won Miss Universe Guatemala. She is the first married woman with children to win the beauty pageant. She then represented her country at Miss Universe 2023 in El Salvador.

Awards and achievements
Preceded by Ivana Batchelor	Miss Guatemala; 2023	Succeeded by Ana Gabriela Villanueva
