= Rachel Christie =

British athlete (born 1988)

- Born: Rachel Sophia Adina Christie; London, England
- Height: 5 ft 10 in (1.78 m)
- Beauty pageant titleholder
- Title: Miss London City 2009; Miss England 2009
- Hair color: Dark brown
- Eye color: Dark / Hazel
- Website: twitter.com/MissRChristie

Rachel Sophia Adina Christie is a British beauty pageant contestant, model and athlete who was briefly Miss England 2009, and the first black woman to hold the title.

In 2015, she returned to the public eye, having appeared on Love Island. Her stint was short-lived, and she was eliminated in Week 2.

== Personal life ==
Christie is the niece of former Olympic sprint champion Linford Christie, who, along with Ron Roddan, serves as her coach. She was born to Russell Christie, Linford's brother, who was killed as part of a drug war at the age of 34, when Rachel was 8.

She became the first black winner of Miss England in 2009. She was mentored by Caprice and was invited by Naomi Campbell to walk in her Fashion for Relief Haiti catwalk show to raise funds for 2010 Haiti earthquake.

In June 2015, she was announced in the line up for the revived reality show Love Island appearing on the show for two weeks.

== Relinquishing of Miss England crown ==
In the early hours of 2 November 2009, Christie was arrested on suspicion of assaulting Miss Manchester, Sara Beverley Jones, at a Manchester nightclub. There was an altercation with Jones which was caught on CCTV. Greater Manchester Police had agreed Christie hadn't committed any crime and was released without charge or caution. Upon her exit from the police station, news of the alleged fight had already made headlines and the speculation intensified and Christie subsequently announced her withdrawal from the Miss World competition. She then relinquished her Miss England crown. The crown was passed on to the runner-up in the 2009 pageant, Katrina Hodge.

Honorary titles
Preceded by Laura Coleman	Miss England; 2009 (relinquished)	Succeeded by Katrina Hodge
