= Jessica Linley =

Crowned Miss England

- Born: 28 March 1989 (age 37); Reading, England
- Beauty pageant titleholder
- Title: Miss Nottingham 2010; Miss England 2010
- Hair colour: Blonde
- Eye colour: Hazel
- Major competitions: Miss Nottingham 2010 (Winner); Miss England 2010 (Winner); Miss World 2010 (Unplaced)

Jessica Linley (born 28 March 1989) is an English actress, model and beauty pageant titleholder who was crowned Miss England 2010 on 1 September 2010. She is originally from Norwich. She was previously crowned Miss Nottingham 2010 and represented the county of Nottinghamshire at the Miss England 2010 competition and later represented England at Miss World 2010 pageant.

In 2016, she played the role as Big Len's girlfriend in Sky One's comedy Trollied.

== Biography ==
Linley was born at the Reading and Wokingham hospital on 28 March 1989, to Michael and Rosemary Linley. She moved from Reading to Norwich in 1991. Linley attended Brundall Primary School and Thorpe St Andrew High School. At sixth form in Norwich, she obtained 3 A-levels in History, English Literature and Religious Studies. At university, she was Treasurer of the Law Society and Finance Officer for the Athletic Union.

== Media ==
In November 2010, she spoke out against the rise in student tuition fees.

Honorary titles
Preceded by Katrina Hodge	Miss England; 2010	Succeeded by Alize Lily Mounter
