= Laura Coleman =

British model

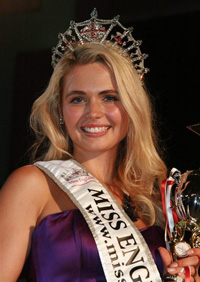
- Laura Coleman in 2008
- Born: 23 February 1986 (age 40); Melton Mowbray, England
- Occupations: Model; influencer; beauty pageant titleholder
- Height: 5 ft 10 in (178 cm)
- Beauty pageant titleholder
- Title: Miss England 2008
- Agency: Models 1 UK; Lind Models Sweden; Okay models Germany; Francina models Spain
- Hair color: Blonde

Laura Coleman (born 23 February 1986) is an English model, influencer and beauty pageant titleholder who was crowned Miss England 2008 and represented England at Miss World 2008.

== Biography ==
Born in Melton Mowbray, Coleman comes from a family of models and beauty pageant winners. Her maternal grandmother Irene won 12 titles and became Miss Army Pin-Up and Miss Lovely Legs in the 1940s. Her mother Dena won 20 titles in her 20s, including Miss East Anglia and was a finalist in the Miss United Kingdom.

Coleman won the title of Miss Leicestershire in 2005 while studying for a degree in business law and marketing at De Montfort University in Leicester, and came fourth in Miss England that year.

Coleman won Miss Derby in 2008 and went on to win Miss England on her second attempt on 18 July 2008, just a day after her graduation. Coleman then represented England in Miss World 2008, in South Africa.

Coleman is currently living in London and represented by Models 1 model agency. Coleman is a social media influencer for sustainable brands and vintage fashion on Instagram.

Honorary titles
Preceded by Georgia Horsley	Miss England; 2008	Succeeded by Rachel Christie
