= Katrina Hodge =

- Born: 29 March 1987 (age 39); Royal Tunbridge Wells, England
- Military career
- Allegiance: United Kingdom
- Branch: British Army
- Service years: 2004–2015
- Rank: Lance corporal
- Nickname: Combat Barbie
- Unit: Adjutant General's Corps
- Other work: Miss England 2009

Katrina Hodge (born 29 March 1987) is a former member of the British Army from Royal Tunbridge Wells, Kent, who was awarded the Miss England 2009 title after Rachel Christie stepped down.

== Biography ==
Born and raised in Tunbridge Wells, Hodge was educated at the Hillview School for Girls in Tonbridge and then, from age 15, at the BRIT School for Performing Arts and Technology in Croydon.

=== Army career ===
Challenged by her older brother to join the army, Hodge enlisted at the age of 17. After basic training, she was assigned to the Royal Anglian Regiment as a member of the Adjutant General's Corps.

Hodge was deployed to Iraq in 2005. She rose to fame within months of her arrival there after it was reported in the British press that she had earned a commendation for her bravery after wrestling two rifles from a prisoner in a struggle that followed a road traffic accident. The incident led to her promotion to lance corporal.

=== Modelling ===
Hodge became a model for a lingerie firm, La Senza, in 2009. She was the runner-up in that year's Miss England competition, but she was awarded the Miss England title after the winner of the pageant, Rachel Christie, resigned it after being involved in a fight. Hodge only had 48 hours to prepare before taking part in the 59th Miss World pageant held in South Africa.

As Miss England, Hodge persuaded the organisers of the pageant to remove the bikini round from their competition. This, she said, would change people's views of beauty pageants: "To be Miss England you don't have to be the girl who looks best in a swimsuit, thankfully it's much more than that, it's about being a good role model". The bikini round of the 2010 competition was replaced with a sportswear round.

During six months leave from the Army that Hodge was granted during her time as Miss England, she fronted a dating site, Uniform Dating, which aims to help uniformed personnel to find romantic partners.

=== Return to army ===
Hodge handed over the Miss England crown to Jessica Linley in September 2010, and returned to active duty in the Army. After various training exercises, she deployed to Afghanistan in early 2011.

=== Quitting the army and abuse allegations ===
In 2015, Hodge decided to leave the army in order to become a banker. In 2018, she revealed that she suffered from sexist abuse from her male colleagues during her deployment in Iraq, and kept receiving insulting messages from them even after her retirement.

Honorary titles
Preceded by Rachel Christie	Miss England; 2009	Succeeded by Jessica Linley
