= Kanishtha Dhankar =

Indian actress and model (b. 1988)

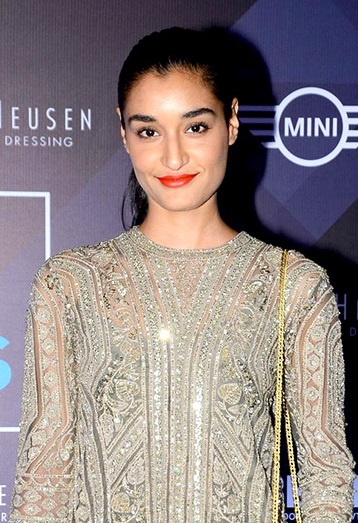
- Dhankar in 2016
- Born: Kanishtha Raj Singh Dhankhar; 21 September 1988 (age 38); Bombay, Maharashtra, India
- Occupations: Model, Actress
- Beauty pageant titleholder
- Title: Femina Miss India World 2011
- Years active: 2008-present
- Major competitions: Femina Miss India World 2011 (Winner) (Miss Body Beautiful) (Miss No Marks) (Miss Ramp Model) (Miss Beautiful Legs) (Miss Water Baby)

Kanishtha Raj Singh Dhankar (born 21 September 1988) is an Indian actress, model and beauty pageant titleholder who was crowned Pantaloons Miss India 2011, whereas Hasleen Kaur was crowned the Femina Miss India Earth. She later represented India at the Miss World 2011 pageant where she placed in top 30.

== Early life ==
Kanishtha was born on 21 September 1988 at the naval base in Bombay, India to Raj Singh Dhankhar, a Commodore in the Indian Navy, and Kusum Malhan Dhankhar. She is second of their three children. Her mother is a school teacher and a home maker and has worked extensively with the Naval Wives Welfare Association in Mumbai. Her ancestral family is from Village Kasni, District Jhajjar, Haryana. Kanishtha was raised in Colaba, Mumbai. She pursued a Bachelor of Commerce degree in H.R. College of Commerce and Economics in Mumbai.

== Career ==
In 2008, she appeared in Madhur Bhandarkar's film Fashion.

== See also ==
- Femina Miss India
- Miss World 2011

Awards and achievements
Preceded by (India) Manasvi Mamgai	Femina Miss India World; 2011	Succeeded by (India) Vanya Mishra
