= Amanda Vilanova =

Puerto Rican model

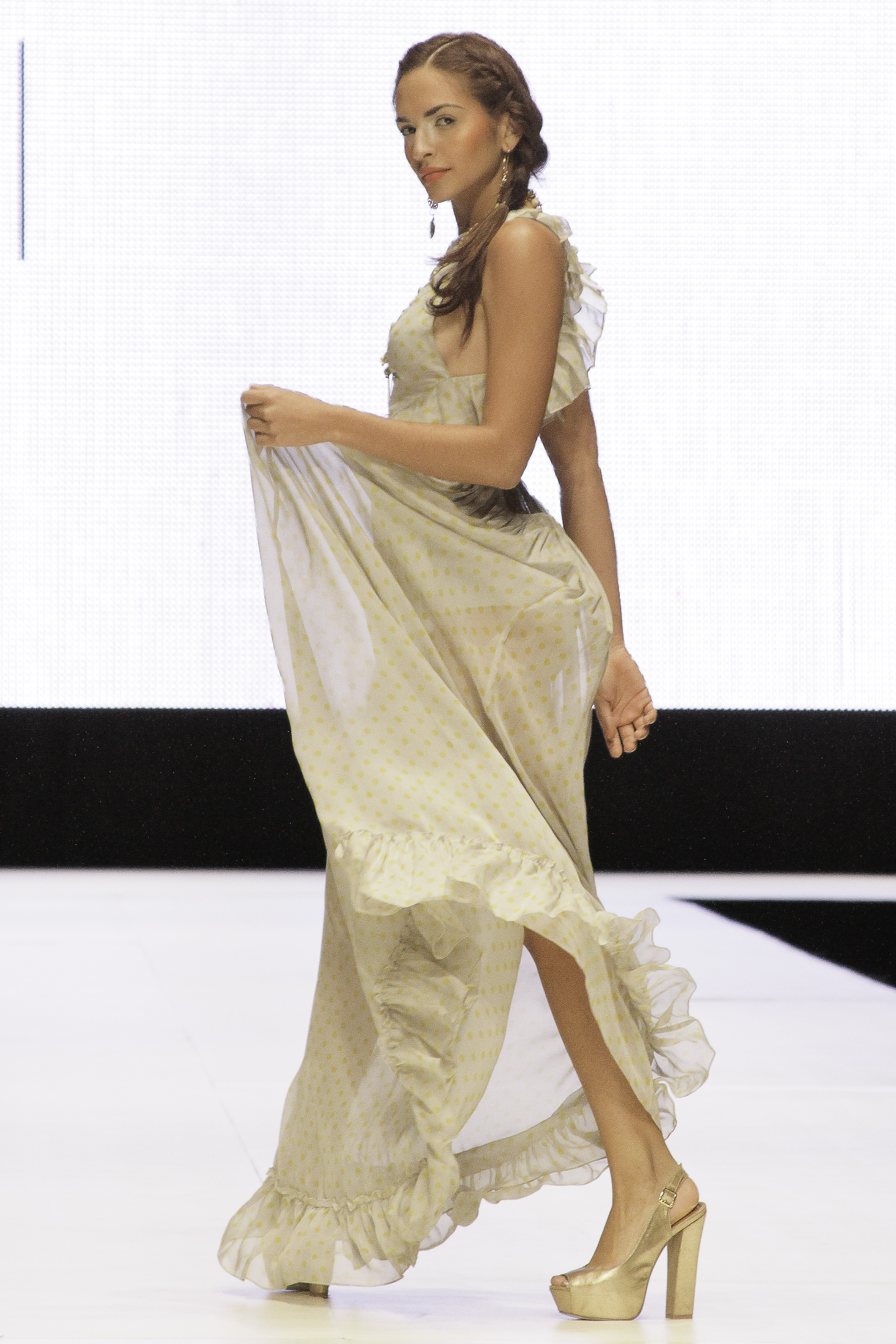
- Amanda modeling at Puerto Rico High Fashion Week 2011 for designer Lisa Thon
- Born: Amanda Victoria Vilanova Pérez; December 30, 1991 (age 34); San Juan, Puerto Rico
- Height: 1.73 m (5 ft 8 in)
- Beauty pageant titleholder
- Title: Miss Latin America Puerto Rico 2010; Miss San Juan World 2011; Miss World Puerto Rico 2011
- Hair color: Brown
- Eye color: Brown
- Major competitions: Miss Latin America Puerto Rico 2010 (Winner); Miss Latin America 2010 (1st Runner-Up); Miss Mundo de Puerto Rico 2011 (Winner); Miss World 2011 (2nd Runner-Up) (Miss World Caribbean 2011)

Amanda Victoria Vilanova Pérez (born December 30, 1991) is a Puerto Rican TV host, model and beauty pageant titleholder who was crowned Miss World Puerto Rico 2011 and placed 2nd runner-up at Miss World 2011.

== Pageant participations ==
=== Miss Latin America 2010 ===
In 2010 she placed 1st Runner-Up in Miss Latin America 2010, in Punta Cana, Dominican Republic.

=== Miss Mundo de Puerto Rico 2011 ===
The Miss World Puerto Rico 2011 pageant was held at the Alejandro Tapia y Rivera Theater, Old San Juan, Puerto Rico, on June 9, 2011, where Vilanova, representing San Juan, won the title.

=== Miss World 2011 ===
Amanda Vilanova represented Puerto Rico at the 61st Miss World 2011 pageant, which was held at London, England, UK on November 6, 2011. She finished as 2nd Runner-Up (2nd Princess) to Ivian Sarcos of Venezuela.

== Theater appearances ==
Vilanova has had experience in various plays as an actress. In 2010 she started acting in the theater during the play Private Lives, directed by José Juan.

In April 2011 she played the role of Sister James in a Spanish translation of John Patrick Shanley's Doubt: A Parable. The play was presented on the Teatro theater in the University of Puerto Rico, Río Piedras Campus.

Awards and achievements
Preceded by (Venezuela) Adriana Vasini	Miss World 2nd Runner-Up; 2011	Succeeded by (Australia) Jessica Kahawaty
Preceded by (Saint Lucia) Aiasha Gustave	Miss World Caribbean; 2011	Succeeded by (Jamaica) Deana Robbins
Preceded by Yara Lasanta (Barranquitas)	Miss Mundo de Puerto Rico; 2011	Succeeded by Janelee Chaparro (Barceloneta)
