= Benazir Charles =

Bonairean model

- Born: Benazir Berends Charles; July 9, 1992 (age 34)
- Height: 1.75 m (5 ft 9 in)
- Beauty pageant titleholder
- Title: Miss Bonaire 2010
- Hair color: Brown
- Eye color: Brown
- Major competitions: Miss Bonaire 2010 (Winner) (Best Runway); Miss Intercontinental 2010 (Top 15); Miss World 2011; Miss Globe 2012

Benazir Berends Charles (born July 9, 1992) is a Bonairean model and beauty pageant titleholder who was crowned Miss Bonaire 2010 and is expected to represent the Dutch public body in the 2011 Miss World pageant. She also placed in the Top 15 at Miss Intercontinental 2010.

== Early life ==
An avid sportswoman, Charles enjoys scuba diving, cycling and canoeing. She speaks Dutch, English and Papiamento.

== Miss Bonaire 2010 ==
Charles, who stands 1.75 m (5 ft 9 in) tall, competed as one of 6 finalists in Miss Bonaire 2010, held on September 4, 2010 in Kralendijk, where she obtained the Best Runway award, Miss Popular, Miss Elegance, Miss Best Evening Gown and became the eventual winner of the title, gaining the right to represent Bonaire in international competitions.

== Miss Intercontinental 2010 ==
Charles competed in Miss Intercontinental 2010, held on November 6, 2010 in Punta Cana, Dominican Republic and became one of the Top 15 semifinalists, 8th runner up of the competition.

== Miss World 2011 ==
Charles also competed in the 2011 Miss World pageant with 113 other contestants, broadcast live from London, the United Kingdom on November 7, 2011 where she became one of the Top 24 of Sportswoman and Top 30 of Beauty with a Purpose in the competition.

== Miss Globe 2012 ==
Benazir also represented Bonaire in the Miss Globe pageant held on November 10, 2012 in Tirana, Albania.

Awards and achievements
Preceded by Julina Felida	Miss Bonaire; 2010	Incumbent
