= Malaika Mushandu =

Zimbabwean beauty pageant titleholder

- Beauty pageant titleholder
- Title: Miss Cosmo Zimbabwe 2026
- Major competitions: Miss World 2011; (Top 15); Miss Universe Zimbabwe 2026; (Miss Cosmo Zimbabwe); Miss Cosmo 2026; (TBD)

Malaika Maidai Mushandu (born 7 June 1993) is a Zimbabwean beauty pageant titleholder and film producer. She was crowned Miss Cosmo Zimbabwe 2026 at the Miss Universe Zimbabwe 2026, earning the right to represent Zimbabwe at the international Miss Cosmo pageant. She produced the film Mirage (2020), directed by Joe Njagu.

== Modelling career ==
Mushandu has said that she grew up admiring local and international models, but did not initially plan to pursue modelling as a career, treating it as a hobby. She has said that her teachers, parents and relatives encouraged her to focus on her studies rather than on modelling.

On 6 November 2011, Mushandu represented Zimbabwe at the Miss World pageant, where she finished in the top fifteen. This made her one of the strongest performing Zimbabwean entrants at Miss World up to that time.

== Return to pageantry ==
In 2026, Mushandu returned to competitive pageantry after a long break. She was named among the Top 30 finalists for the Miss Universe Zimbabwe 2026 pageant.

At the grand finale, held in Harare in the early hours of 7 June 2026, she was crowned Miss Cosmo Zimbabwe 2026. As a national titleholder, she was reported to be in line to receive a Honda Fit vehicle and a sponsorship package.

Awards and achievements
Preceded by Lisa Sibanda	Miss Cosmo Zimbabwe; 2026	Succeeded by Incumbent
Preceded by Samantha Ntombizodwa Tshuma	Miss Zimbabwe; 2011	Succeeded by Bongani Dlakama
