= Elizabeth Grant (model) =

Beauty queen

Elizabeth Grant (born 1996 in Preston, England) is an English model and beauty pageant titleholder who was crowned Miss England 2016. She previously had been Miss Preston.

Grant won the title of Miss Preston in April 2016 and won the national title of Miss England in July the same year. She competed for the Miss World 2016 title in Washington, D.C. in December 2016, where she also became the first Miss England to perform a rap as part of the talent round.

Since becoming Miss England, Grant has become an ambassador for the Derian House hospice, a position motivated by the hospice's treatment of Grant's older now-deceased sister. She is a student of psychology at Liverpool Hope University.
