= Miss World 2011 =

International beauty pageant

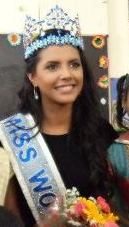
- Miss World 2011, Ivian Sarcos
- Date: 6 November 2011
- Presenters: Jason Cook; Angela Chow; Steve Douglas
- Entertainment: Diversity; Blue; Ramin Karimloo
- Venue: Earls Court Exhibition Centre, London, United Kingdom
- Broadcaster: E!; ITV; GMA Network
- Entrants: 113
- Placements: 31
- Debuts: Kyrgyzstan; Saint Barthélemy
- Withdrawals: Angola; Cape Verde; Ethiopia; French Polynesia; Guyana; Lesotho; Luxembourg; Macau; Malawi; Saint Kitts and Nevis; Saint Lucia; Suriname; Zambia
- Returns: Austria; Bermuda; Bonaire; Chile; Dominican Republic; Guam; Liberia; Nicaragua; Slovenia
- Winner: Ivian Sarcos; Venezuela

Miss World 2011 was the 61st edition of the Miss World pageant, held at the Earls Court Two in London, United Kingdom, on 6 November 2011.

At the end of the event, Alexandria Mills of the United States crowned Ivian Sarcos of Venezuela as her successor at the end of the event. She is the sixth Venezuelan to win Miss World - currently tied with India for the most wins in the competition's history. The first and second runners-up was the Philippines's Gwendoline Ruais and Puerto Rico's Amanda Vilanova. 113 contestants competed for the crown.

== Debuts, returns, and, withdrawals ==
This edition saw the debut of Kyrgyzstan and Saint Barthélemy, and the return of Austria, Bermuda, Bonaire, Chile, Dominican Republic, Guam, Liberia, Nicaragua and Slovenia; Bermuda, which last competed in 1995, Bonaire and Guam in 1996, Nicaragua in 2005, Chile in 2008 and Austria, Dominican Republic, Liberia and Slovenia in 2009.

Angola, Cape Verde, Ethiopia, French Polynesia, Guyana, Lesotho, Luxembourg, Macau, Malawi, Saint Kitts and Nevis, Saint Lucia, Suriname and Zambia, withdrew from the competition.

== Results ==
=== Placements ===
Placement	Contestant
Miss World 2011	Venezuela – Ivian Sarcos
1st Runner-Up	Philippines – Gwendoline Ruais
2nd Runner-Up	Puerto Rico – Amanda Vilanova
Top 7	England – Alize Lily Mounter; Scotland – Jennifer Reoch; South Africa – Bokang Montjane; South Korea – Kyung Min Doe
Top 15	Indonesia – Astrid Yunadi; Italy – Tania Bambaci; Kazakhstan – Zhanna Zhumaliyeva; Spain – Carla García; Sweden – Nicoline Artursson; Ukraine – Iaroslava Kuriacha; United States Virgin Islands – Esonica Veira; Zimbabwe – Malaika Mushandu
Top 20	Botswana – Karabo Sampson; Chile – Gabriela Pulgar; Guatemala – Lourdes Figueroa; Paraguay – Nicole Huber; Saint Barthélemy – Johanna Sansano
Top 31	Australia – Amber Greasley; Brazil – Juceila Bueno; Canada – Riza Santos; Hungary – Linda Szunai; India – Kanishtha Dhankhar; Japan – Midori Tanaka; New Zealand – Mianette Broekman; Russia – Natalia Gantimurova; Serbia – Milica Tepavac; Thailand – Patcharida Blatchford; Trinidad and Tobago – Lee-Ann Forbes

==== Continental Queens of Beauty ====
Continental Group	Contestant
Africa	South Africa - Bokang Montjane
Americas	Venezuela - Ivian Sarcos
Asia & Oceania	Philippines - Gwendoline Ruais
Caribbean	Puerto Rico - Amanda Vilanova
Europe	England - Alize Lily Mounter

== Challenge Events ==
=== Beach Beauty ===
Placement	Contestant
Winner	England – Alize Lily Mounter
Top 20	Bolivia – Yohana Vaca Guzmán; Brazil – Juceila Bueno; Italy – Tania Bambaci; Kazakhstan – Zhanna Zhumaliyeva; Martinique – Axelle Perrier; New Zealand – Mianette Broekman; Northern Ireland – Finola Guinnane; Paraguay – Nicole Huber; Philippines – Gwendoline Ruais; Puerto Rico – Amanda Vilanova; Russia – Natalia Gantimurova; Saint Barthélemy – Johanna Sansano; Serbia – Milica Tepavac; South Korea – Kyung-min Doe; Spain – Carla García; Sweden – Nicoline Artursson; Ukraine – Iaroslava Kuriacha; Venezuela – Ivian Sarcos; Zimbabwe – Malaika Mushandu

=== Beauty With a Purpose ===
Placement	Contestant
Winner(s)	Ghana – Stephanie Karikari; Indonesia – Astrid Yunadi
Top 30	Argentina – Antonella Kruger; Bahamas – Sasha Joyce; Barbados – Taisha Shaddai Carrington; Bonaire – Benazir Charles; Botswana – Karabo Sampson; Ecuador – Verónica Vargas; England – Alize Lily Mounter; Guatemala – Lourdes Figueroa; India – Kanishtha Dhankar; Kenya – Catherine Onyango; Latvia – Alise Miškovska; Liberia – Meenakshi Subramani; Malaysia – Chloe Chen Tien Nee; Malta – Claire Busuttil; Namibia – Luzaan van Wyk; Nepal – Malina Joshi; Peru – Odilia García; Philippines –Gwendoline Ruais; Puerto Rico –Amanda Vilanova; Scotland –Jennifer Reoch; South Africa – Bokang Montjane; Spain – Carla García; Sri Lanka – Pushpika Sandamali; Sweden – Nicoline Artursson; Tanzania – Salha Kifai; Thailand – Patcharida Blatchford; US Virgin Islands – Esonica Veira; Zimbabwe – Malaika Mushandu

=== Sports Challenge ===
Placement	Group	Contestant
Winner	Dominican Republic – Marianly Burgos	
Top 24	Group 1 (Red Team)	Australia – Amber Greasley; Bahamas – Sasha Joyce; Bolivia – Yohana Vaca Guzmán; Bonaire – Benazir Charles; Canada – Riza Santos; Chile – Gabriela Pulgar
Top 24	Group 2 (Green Team)	Botswana – Karabo Sampson; Czech Republic – Denisa Domanská; Denmark – Maya Olese; Dominican Republic – Marianly Burgos; Guatemala – Lourdes Figueroa; Hungary – Linda Szunai
Top 24	Group 3 (Blue Team)	Germany – Sabrina-Nathalie Reitz; Jamaica – Danielle Crosskill; Latvia – Alise Miškovska; Panama – Irene Núñez; Paraguay – Nicole Huber; Portugal – Bárbara Franco
Top 24	Group 4 (Orange Team)	Puerto Rico – Amanda Vilanova; Scotland – Jennifer Reoch; Singapore – May Hsu; Sweden – Nicoline Artursson; Trinidad and Tobago – Lee-Ann Forbes; Uganda – Sylvia Namutebi

=== Talent ===
Placement	Contestant
Winner	Chile – Gabriela Pulgar
Top 11	China – Liu Chen; Guatemala – Lourdes Figueroa; Indonesia – Astrid Yunadi; Kazakhstan – Zhanna Zhumaliyeva; Lithuania – Ieva Gervinskaitė; Paraguay – Nicole Huber; Puerto Rico – Amanda Vilanova; Saint Barthélemy – Johanna Sansano; Ukraine – Iaroslava Kuriacha; US Virgin Islands – Esonica Veira
Top 20	

=== Top Model ===
Placement	Contestant
Winner	Kazakhstan – Zhanna Zhumaliyeva
Top 20	Albania – Isi Topçiu-Ulaj; Argentina – Antonella Kruger; Australia – Amber Greasley; Barbados – Taisha Shaddai Carrington; Bolivia – Yohana Vaca Guzman; China – Liu Chen; England – Alize Lily Mounter; France – Clémence Marie Oleksy; India – Kanishtha Dhankar; Italy – Tania Bambaci; Japan – Midori Tanaka; Kenya – Catherine Onyango; Martinique – Axelle Perrier; Philippines – Gwendoline Ruais; South Korea – Kyung-min Doe; Sweden – Nicoline Artursson; Ukraine – Iaroslava Kuriacha; Venezuela – Ivian Sarcos; Zimbabwe – Malaika Mushandu

== Judges ==
Miss World 2011 contestants were evaluated by a panel of judges.

- Julia Morley – Chairwoman of the Miss World Organization
- Denise Perrier – Miss World 1953 from France
- Antigone Costanda – Miss World 1954 from Egypt
- Cindy Breakspeare – Miss World 1976 from Jamaica
- Linda Pétursdóttir – Miss World 1988 from Iceland
- Agbani Darego – Miss World 2001 from Nigeria
- Zhang Zilin – Miss World 2007 from China
- Ksenia Sukhinova – Miss World 2008 from Russia
- Kaiane Aldorino – Miss World 2009 from Gibraltar
- Krish Naidoo – Miss World International Ambassador
- Mike Dixon – Musical Director
- George Kotsiopoulos – Fashion Stylist & Editor
- Warren Batchelor – Miss World Executive Producer
- Andrew Minarik – Make-Up Artist & Hairdresser

== Contestants ==
Contestants from 113 countries participated in Miss World 2011.

Country/Territory	Contestant	Age (Note: Ages at the time of the pageant)	Hometown
Albania	Isi Topçiu-Ulaj	18	Tirana
Argentina	Antonella Kruger	19	Zárate
Aruba	Gillain Berry	24	Oranjestad
Australia	Amber Greasley	18	Brisbane
Austria	Julia Hofer	19	Mayrhofen
Bahamas	Sasha Joyce	23	New Providence
Barbados	Taisha Shaddai Carrington	18	Bridgetown
Belarus	Anastasiya Kharlanava	21	Gomel
Belgium	Justine De Jonckheere	19	Wevelgem
Belize	Kadejah Tunn	18	Belize City
Bermuda	Jana Lynn Outerbridge	22	St. George's
Bolivia	Yohana Vaca Guzmán	24	Cotoca
Bonaire	Benazir Charles	19	Kralendijk
Bosnia and Herzegovina	Snežana Kuzmanović	17	Laktaši
Botswana	Karabo Sampson	21	Tsabong
Brazil	Juceila Bueno	23	Vera Cruz
Bulgaria	Vanya Peneva	23	Kazanlak
Canada	Riza Santos	25	Calgary
Cayman Islands	Lindsay Japal	23	George Town
Chile	Gabriela Pulgar	23	Santiago
China	Liu Chen	25	Harbin
Colombia	Mónica Restrepo	21	Bogotá
Costa Rica	Paola Chaverri	20	Heredia
Côte d'Ivoire	Kohiman Kouadio	18	Gagnoa
Croatia	Katarina Prnjak	21	Šibenik
Curaçao	Monifa Jansen	18	Willemstad
Cyprus	Orthodoxia Panagi	19	Larnaca
Czech Republic	Denisa Domanská	19	Kyjov
Denmark	Maya Olesen	20	Christiansfeld
Dominican Republic	Marianly Burgos	20	San Francisco de Macorís
Ecuador	Verónica Vargas	22	Guayaquil
Egypt	Donia Hamed	23	Cairo
El Salvador	Karen Castro	18	San Salvador
England	Alize Lily Mounter	22	London
Finland	Sara Sieppi	20	Tornio
France	Clémence Marie Oleksy	20	Vichy
Georgia	Janet Kerdikoshvili	19	Tbilisi
Germany	Sabrina-Nathalie Reitz	21	Langenselbold
Ghana	Stephanie Karikari	19	Atwima
Gibraltar	Michelle Gillingwater Pedersen	24	Gibraltar
Greece	Eleni Miariti	21	Athens
Guadeloupe	Violaine Grainville	20	Saint-Claude
Guam	Siera Robertson	21	Yoña
Guatemala	Lourdes Figueroa	23	Guatemala City
Honduras	Bessy López	18	Choloma
Hong Kong	Hyman Chu	24	Hong Kong
Hungary	Linda Szunai	18	Nagykovácsi
Iceland	Sigrún Eva Ármannsdóttir	18	Akranes
India	Kanishtha Dhankar	22	Mumbai
Indonesia	Astrid Yunadi	21	Surabaya
Ireland	Holly Carpenter	20	Dublin
Israel	Ella Ran	21	Herzlia
Italy	Tania Bambaci	21	Barcellona Pozzo di Gotto
Jamaica	Danielle Crosskill	25	Kingston
Japan	Midori Tanaka	23	Okayama
Kazakhstan	Zhanna Zhumaliyeva	24	Uralsk
Kenya	Catherine Onyango	19	Githurai
Kyrgyzstan	Nazira Nurzhanova	24	Bishkek
Latvia	Alise Miškovska	23	Daugavpils
Lebanon	Yara Khouri-Mikhael	19	Byblos
Liberia	Meenakshi Subramani	23	Bensonville
Lithuania	Ieva Gervinskaitė	21	Skuodas
Macedonia	Vesna Jakimovska	20	Struga
Malaysia	Chloe Chen Tien Nee	21	Kuala Lumpur
Malta	Claire Busuttil	22	Żabbar
Martinique	Axelle Perrier	20	Fort-de-France
Mauritius	Joëlle Nagapen	22	St. Pierre
Mexico	Gabriela Palacio	22	Aguascalientes
Moldova	Veronica Popovici	21	Chișinău
Mongolia	Buyankhishig Unurbayar	22	Ulaanbaatar
Montenegro	Maja Maraš	20	Podgorica
Namibia	Luzaan van Wyk	24	Windhoek
Nepal	Malina Joshi	23	Dharan
Netherlands	Lauren de Robles	22	Emmen
New Zealand	Mianette Broekman	22	Auckland
Nicaragua	Darling Trujillo	24	Ciudad Darío
Nigeria	Sylvia Nduka	20	Isuofia
Northern Ireland	Finola Guinnane	22	Drumbo
Norway	Anna Larsen Zahl	23	Sortland
Panama	Irene Núñez	24	Santiago de Veraguas
Paraguay	Nicole Huber	21	Asunción
Peru	Odilia García	24	Lima
Philippines	Gwendoline Ruais	21	Muntinlupa
Poland	Angelika Ogryzek	19	Szczecin
Portugal	Bárbara Franco	19	Ribeira Brava
Puerto Rico	Amanda Vilanova	20	San Juan
Romania	Alexandra Stănescu	21	Pucioasa
Russia	Natalia Gantimurova	20	Moscow
Saint Barthélemy	Johanna Sansano	21	Gustavia
Scotland	Jennifer Reoch	22	Glasgow
Serbia	Milica Tepavac	23	Novi Sad
Sierra Leone	Natasha Beckley	24	Freetown
Singapore	May Hsu	21	Singapore
Slovakia	Michaela Ňurciková	21	Nové Zámky
Slovenia	Lana Mahnič Jekoš	21	Grosuplje
South Africa	Bokang Montjane	25	Johannesburg
South Korea (Note: Competed as Korea in the pageant)	Kyung-min Doe	20	Daegu
Spain	Carla García	21	Telde
Sri Lanka	Pushpika Sandamali	21	Colombo
Sweden	Nicoline Artursson	18	Halmstad
Tanzania	Salha Kifai	18	Ilala
Thailand	Patcharida Blatchford	21	Bangkok
Trinidad and Tobago	Lee-Ann Forbes	21	Saint James
Turkey	Gizem Karaca	19	Istanbul
Uganda	Sylvia Namutebi	23	Kampala
Ukraine	Iaroslava Kuriacha	19	Vinnytsia
United States	Erin Cummins	19	Arlington
United States Virgin Islands	Esonica Mictecia Veira	22	St. Thomas
Uruguay	Karina Maldonado	18	Montevideo
Venezuela	Ivian Sarcos	22	Guanare
Vietnam	Victoria Phạm Thúy Vy	22	Hanoi
Wales	Sara Manchipp	21	Port Talbot
Zimbabwe	Malaika Mushandu	19	Harare

== Notes ==
=== Designations ===
- Albania – Isi Topçiu-Ulaj was appointed to represent Albania, she was the 3rd runner-up at the Miss Albania 2010 pageant.
- Belarus – Anastasiya Kharlanava was appointed to represent Belarus, after no national pageant was held because the Miss Belarus pageant is a bi-annual event. It was last time held in 2010. Anastasiya was the 2nd runner-up at the Miss Belarus 2010 pageant.
- Curaçao – Monifa Jansen was appointed as Senorita Kòrsou World 2011 after she wasn't allowed to compete at Miss Universe 2011 because she didn't meet the age minimum requirement.
- Egypt – Donia Hamed was appointed to represent Egypt after no national pageant was held due to the political crisis. Donia was previously Miss Universe Egypt 2010.
- Greece – Eleni Miariti was appointed to represent Greece, after no national pageant was held due to the financial crisis. She was chosen among the group of contestants that took part of the Miss World Greece 2011 casting call held on 8 October.
- Guatemala – Lourdes Figueroa was appointed to represent Guatemala. She was Miss Guatemala 2009 and delegate at Miss Universe 2009
- Mongolia – Buyankhishig Unurbayar.
- Nicaragua – Darling Trujillo was appointed "Miss Mundo Nicaragua 2011" after the new national director Denis Davila, was awarded the license of Miss World in Nicaragua.
- United States – Erin Cummins was appointed to represent United States by Elite Models, license holders for Miss World in the United States. Cummins works for Elite Models as a professional model.
- United States Virgin Islands – Esonica Veira was appointed to represent US Virgin Islands, she was the 1st runner-up at the Miss Universe US Virgin Islands 2011 pageant.
- Vietnam – Victoria Phạm Thúy Vy was appointed to represent Vietnam after Miss Vietnam 2010 Đặng Thị Ngọc Hân refused to compete in the competition, she is the 2nd runner-up of Miss Vietnam World 2010.

=== Replacements ===
- Austria – Julia Hofer replaced the original winner of Miss Austria 2011 pageant, Carmen Stamboli, because Carmen was overage and didn't meet the age requirements stipulated by Miss World organisation. Julia was the 1st runner-up at the national pageant.
- Hong Kong – Miss Hong Kong 2011 winner Rebecca Zhu was replaced by the 1st runner-up Hyman Chu, Because Rebecca was too busy to star in her first TV Drama ever during Miss World 2011.
- Mauritius – Joelle Nagapen replaced Laetitia Darche due to Laetitia's participation at the Miss Intercontinental 2011 pageant. Joelle was the 1st runner-up at the Miss Mauritius 2010 pageant.
- Mexico – Cynthia de la Vega was replaced by Gabriela Palacio after being dethroned for failing to fulfill her duties as Miss World Mexico.
