= Nicoline Artursson =

Swedish model

- Born: 1993 (age 32–33); Stockholm, Sweden
- Occupation: Fashion Model

Nicoline Artursson (born 1993) is a Swedish fashion model and beauty pageant titleholder who won Miss World Sweden 2011. Artursson represented Sweden in Miss World 2011 on November 6 in London where she made the top 15. Nicoline Artursson was born in the village of Villshärad outside Halmstad. Artursson speaks French after living in Paris, France for a year modelling for the clothing company Abercrombie & Fitch located on Champs-Élysées. Artursson was also offered to be the Bachelorette in the French version of the television reality series The Bachelorette, but declined as she had to finish her studies back in Sweden.

In 2018, Artursson was a contestant on Robinson: Fiji, broadcast on TV4, where she finished 9th.

In 2025, Artursson's partner, English television personality James Argent, was convicted of a gender violence offence against her while on holiday in Mijas.
