= Carina Tyrrell =

Swiss-British physician (born 1989)

Doctor Carina Tyrrell
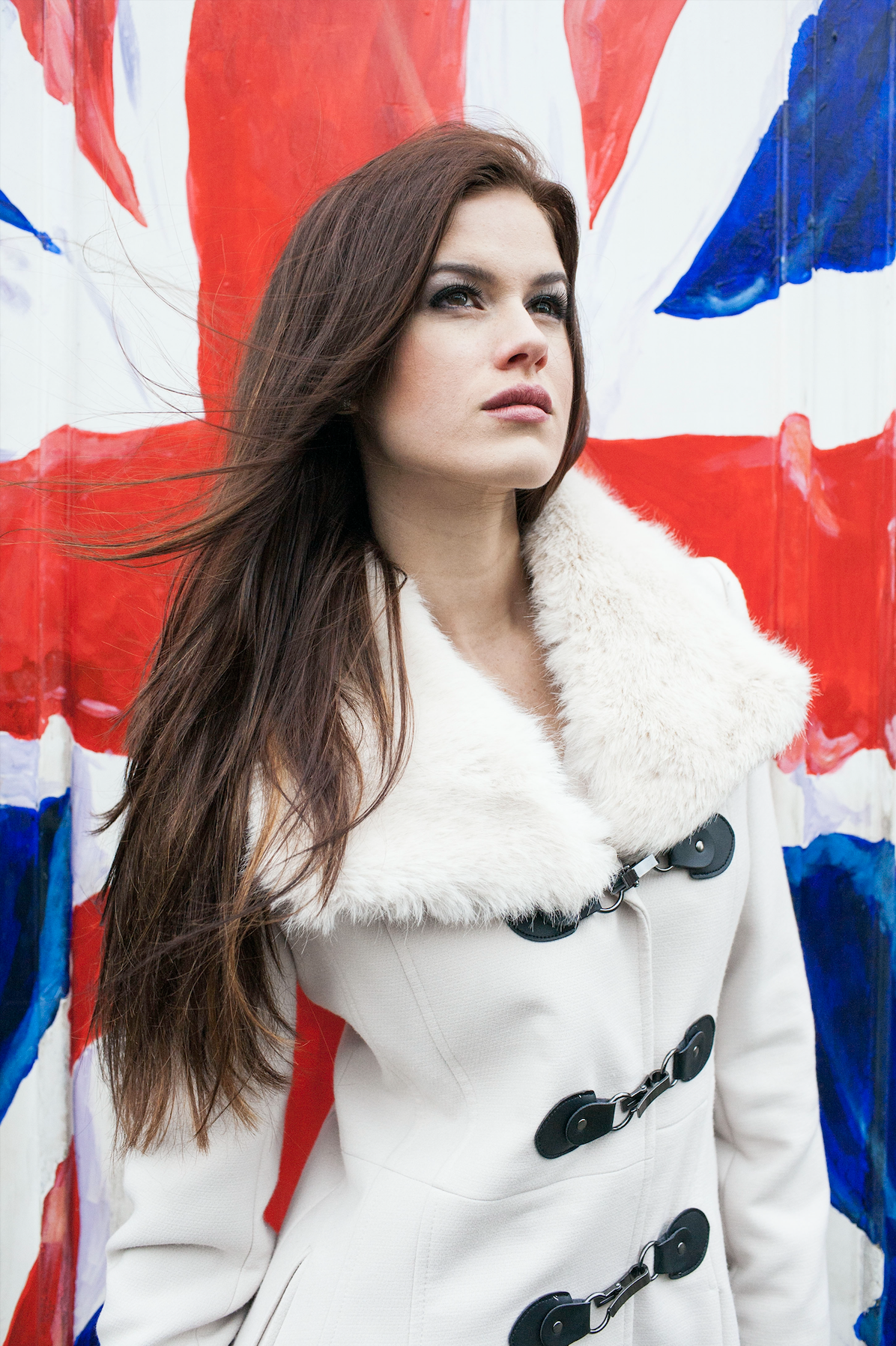
- Tyrrell at Miss World
- Born: 24 October 1989 (age 36); Geneva, Switzerland
- Education: International School of Geneva
- Alma mater: University of Cambridge (MA) University of Cambridge (MPH) University of Cambridge (MB BChir)
- Occupations: Physician; Business; Philanthropist
- Beauty pageant titleholder
- Title: Miss England 2014; Miss United Kingdom 2014
- Major competitions: Miss England 2014 (Winner); Miss United Kingdom 2014 (Winner); Miss World 2014 (Top 5)
- Website: http://www.carinatyrrell.com/

Carina Tyrrell (born 24 October 1989) is a British-Swiss public health physician, investor, philanthropist, and Fellow at the University of Cambridge who was crowned Miss England and Miss United Kingdom in 2014. Tyrrell graduated from the University of Cambridge with first-class honours, featured on the front page of The Times for her work to deliver the Oxford–AstraZeneca COVID-19 vaccine, and is known for making international news for being the first woman from one of the world's top universities, to participate in Miss World.

== Early life and education ==
Tyrrell was born in Geneva, Switzerland, and attended the International School of Geneva where she learned to speak French fluently. In 2009, she went on to study Natural Sciences at the University of Cambridge graduating from Murray Edwards College, Cambridge.

She read medicine at Cambridge University Medical School where she graduated with a Bachelor of Medicine, Bachelor of Surgery (MB BChir), a Master of Public Health (MPH), and was featured as one of the most impressive students by the Business Insider.

== Global health research ==
Tyrrell supported the delivery of the Oxford–AstraZeneca COVID-19 vaccine, having worked during the COVID-19 pandemic collaborating with Oxford University to analyse data from hundreds of vaccine and treatment trials all over the world.

An expert in global public health, Tyrrell published several papers on identifying and managing emerging respiratory viruses during time with the Oxford Nuffield Department of Population Health, and the World Health Organization Global Outbreak Alert and Response Network.

In 2016, she spent several years working as a physician at Oxford University Hospitals NHS Foundation Trust before returning to the Cambridge Biomedical Campus where she worked with technology companies Huma and Drawbridge Health on their product validation.

== Business career ==
Tyrrell is a healthcare and technology investor and founder, having worked at Goldman Sachs in London and Walden Catalyst Ventures across Palo Alto, Tel Aviv, Berlin, Geneva, and London.

Tyrrell works as Investor and Chief of Staff at Walden Catalyst, a $550 million early-stage deep tech venture capital fund led by the CEO of Intel and former President of Samsung, Lip-Bu Tan and Young Sohn, respectively.

== Boards and memberships ==
Tyrrell is a Governor for Cambridge University Hospitals NHS Foundation Trust, Council Member of the Royal Society of Medicine, Public Health and Epidemiology Section, and a former president of the Cambridge University Global Health Society.

She has appeared on BBC News, ITV News, Sky News, BBC Radio 4, and has been featured in The Times, Business Insider, and The Daily Telegraph.

== Philanthropy ==
Having declared herself a feminist, Tyrrell faced criticism from Germaine Greer, herself a Cambridge University graduate. Tyrrell used her profile as a women's rights advocate to help raise millions in funding for women and children, health and innovation causes.

An ambassador for homeless charities, Tyrrell slept rough on the streets of Cambridge during the Miss World competition to raise awareness of homelessness. Tyrrell has undertaken humanitarian projects in countries around the world including India, Brazil, Côte d’Ivoire, Ghana, and Rwanda.
