= Ivana Batchelor =

Guatemalan beauty pageant titleholder

- Born: Ivana Elizabeth de los Santos Batchelor; Guatemala
- Height: 1.82 m (6 ft 0 in)
- Beauty pageant titleholder
- Hair color: Light Brown
- Eye color: Brown
- Major competitions: Miss Grand International 2020 (2nd Runner-Up); Miss Universe 2022 (Unplaced)

Elizabeth Ivana de los Santos Batchelor is a Guatemalan beauty pageant titleholder who represented her country at Miss Grand International 2020 and was second runner-up. She represented Guatemala at Miss Universe 2022 where she was unplaced.

== Early life and education ==
Batchelor is currently studying Communication science.

== Pageantry ==
=== Miss Grand International 2020 ===
On March 27, 2021, Batchelor represented Guatemala at Miss Grand International 2020 and competed against 62 other candidates at SHOW DC in Bangkok, Thailand, winning second runner-up. She also became one of three winners in the Best National Costume category.

=== Miss Universe 2022 ===
She represented Guatemala at Miss Universe 2022.

Awards and achievements
Preceded by Dannia Guevara	Miss Universe Guatemala; 2022	Succeeded by Michelle Cohn
Preceded by Thailand Arayha Suparurk	Miss Grand International 2nd Runner-Up; 2020	Succeeded by Brazil Lorena Rodrigues
Preceded by Dannia Guevara	Miss Grand Guatemala; 2020	Succeeded by María José Sazo
