= Miss Guatemala =

Beauty pageant

Miss Guatemala Organization
- Formation: 1955; 71 years ago
- Headquarters: Guatemala City
- Location: Guatemala
- Official language: Spanish
- President: Oscar Flores
- Affiliations: Miss World; Miss International; Reina Hispanoamericana; Miss Earth; Miss Supranational; Miss Grand International; Miss Charm; Miss Cosmo

The Miss Guatemala is a national Beauty pageant in Guatemala. It was founded in 1955, where the winners were sent to International pageants including Miss World, and Miss International.

== History ==
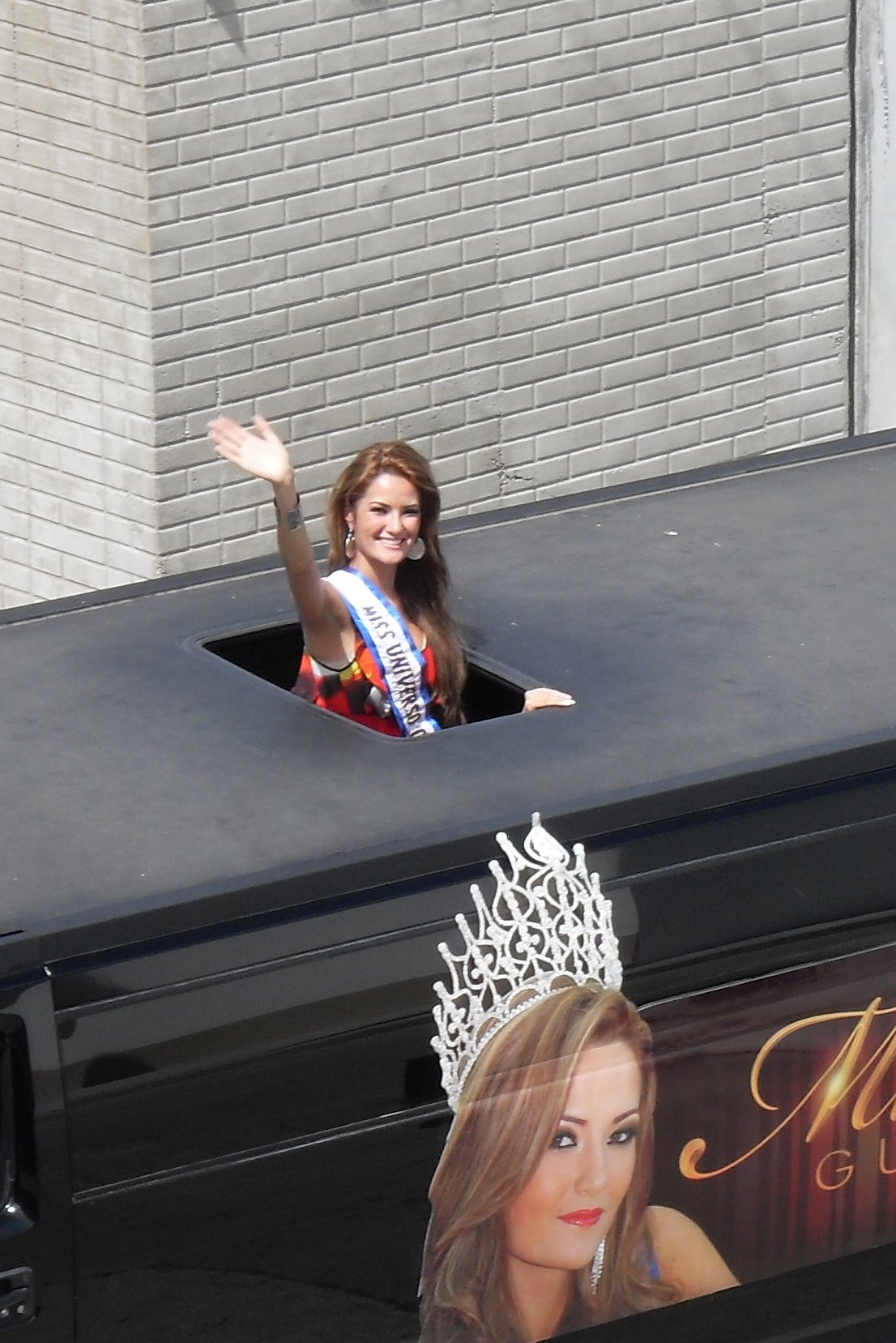
Lourdes Figueroa, Miss Guatemala 2009 and Miss World Guatemala 2011

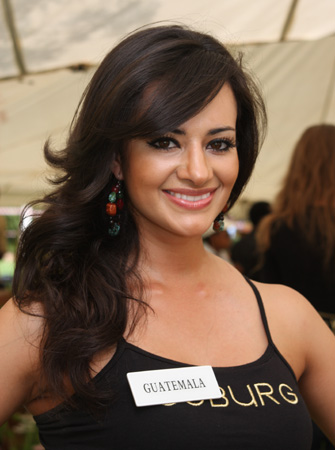
Maribel Arana, Miss World Guatemala 2008

Miss Guatemala was founded in 1955 and sent its first winner to represent Guatemala at Miss Universe 1955. Guatemala's last placement was in the top 30 in 2025 by Raschel Paz, top 40 at Miss World 2017 by Virginia Argueta.

=== Franchise holders ===
The pageant holds three of the Big Four beauty pageants' franchises; Miss World, Miss International and Miss Earth. Winners represent Guatemala at Miss Universe, with the runners-up to Miss Guatemala Mundo and Miss International.

In 2016, Miss Universo Guatemala held a separate pageant, and the winner went to Miss Universe. Meanwhile, Miss Guatemala Mundo will be together with Miss Guatemala Internacional title.

In 2020, the other Miss Guatemala Organization held a separate pageant, with the winner title going to Miss Earth. The runner-ups were sent to Miss Intercontinental and Miss Tourism International.

In 2026, the Miss Guatemala holds eight franchises included Miss World, Miss International, Reina Hispanoamericana, Miss Earth, Miss Supranational, Miss Grand International, Miss Charm, and Miss Cosmo.

== International wins ==
- One – Miss International winner:
  - Ilma Urrutia (1984)

== Titleholders ==
The following women have represented Guatemala at the Big Four international beauty pageants. These are Miss World, Miss Universe, Miss International and Miss Earth.

Year	Miss Guatemala	Province
1955	María del Rosario Molina	Ciudad Capital
1956	Ileana Garlinger	Chiquimula
1957	Ana Walda Olyslager	Ciudad Capital
1958	Maya Glinz	Ciudad Capital
1959	Rogelia Cruz	Ciudad Capital
1961	Anabella Sáenz	Ciudad Capital
1975	Emy Elvia Abascal	Ciudad Capital
1976	Blanca Alicia Montenegro	Ciudad Capital
1978	Claudia María Iriarte	Ciudad Capital
1979	Michelle Marie Domínguez	Ciudad Capital
1980	Lizabeth Iveth Martínez	Alta Verapaz
1981	Yuma Rossana Lobos	Ciudad Capital
1982	Edith Suzanne Whitbeck	Ciudad Capital
1983	Berta Victoria Gonzales	Escuintla
1984	Ilma Urrutia	Jutiapa
1985	Perla Liseth Prera	Ciudad Capital
1986	Christa Kalula Wellman	Alta Verapaz
1987	María Isabel Flores	Ciudad Capital
1988	Silvia Mansilla	Ciudad Capital
1989	Helka Lisbeth Cuevas	Chiquimula
1990	Marianela Amelia Abate	Ciudad Capital
1991	María Lorena Palacios	Santa Rosa
1992	Nancy Maricela Pérez	Chiquimula
1993	Diana Lucrecia Galvan	San Marcos
1994	Katya Schoenstedt	Ciudad Capital
1995	Indira Lili Chinchilla	Ciudad Capital
1996	Karla Hannelore Beteta	Ciudad Capital
1997	Carol Anabella Aquino	Chiquimula
1998	Astrid Gabriela Ramírez	Ciudad Capital
1999	Mónica María Penedo	Sacatepéquez
2000	Evelyn Liseth López	Jalapa
2001	Rosa María Castañeda	Chiquimula
2002	Carina Maribel Velásquez	Zacapa
2003	Florecita de Jesus Cobián	Sacatepéquez
2004	Marva Cecilia Weatherborn	Izabal
2005	Karina Estrada	Ciudad Capital
2006	Jackelinne Piccinini	Suchitepéquez
2007	Alida Boer	Ciudad Capital
2008	Jennifer Chiong	Quetzaltenango
2009	Lourdes Figueroa	Ciudad Capital
2010	Jessica Scheel	Ciudad Capital
2011	Alejandra Barillas	Zacapa
2012	Laura Godoy	Ciudad Capital
2013	Andrea Paullete Samayoa	Ciudad Capital
2014	Ana Luisa Montufar	Ciudad Capital
2015	Jeimmy Aburto	Ciudad Capital
2016	Virginia Argueta	Jutiapa
2017	Isel Suñiga	San Marcos
2018	Mariana García	Ciudad Capital
2021	Dannia Guevara	San Marcos
2022	Ivana Batchelor	Quetzaltenango
2023	Michelle Cohn	Guatemala City

== Titleholders under Miss Guatemala org. ==
=== Miss Guatemala Universo ===
- : Declared the as Winner
- : Finished as arunner-up or top 5/6 qualification
- : Finished as one of the finalists or semifinalists
- : Finished as a special awards winner

In the past, the winner of the Miss Guatemala was either appointed to represent the nation at Miss Universe or Miss International. However, the winner automatically earns the right to represent Guatemala at Miss Universe.

Year	Province	Miss Guatemala	Placement at Miss Universe	Special Awards
2026	Sacatepéquez	Adelina Castillo		
2025	Ciudad Capital	Raschel Paz	Top 30	
2024	Ciudad Capital	Gabriela Villanueva	Unplaced	Voice For Change (Gold Winner)
2023	Ciudad Capital	Michelle Cohn	Unplaced	
2022	Quetzaltenango	Ivana Batchelor	Unplaced	
2021	San Marcos	Dannia Guevara	Unplaced	
Did not compete between 2019—2020
2018	Ciudad Capital	Mariana García	Unplaced	
2017	San Marcos	Isel Suñiga	Unplaced	
2016	Jutiapa	Virginia Argueta	Unplaced	
2015	Ciudad Capital	Jeimmy Aburto	Unplaced	
2014	Ciudad Capital	Ana Luisa Montufar	Unplaced	
2013	Ciudad Capital	Andrea Paullete Samayoa	Unplaced	
2012	Ciudad Capital	Laura Godoy	Unplaced	Miss Congeniality
2011	Zacapa	Alejandra Barrillas	Unplaced	
2010	Ciudad Capital	Jessica Scheel	Top 10	
2009	Ciudad Capital	Lourdes Figueroa	Unplaced	
2008	Quetzaltenango	Jennifer Chiong	Unplaced	
2007	Ciudad Capital	Alida Boer	Unplaced	
2006	Suchitepéquez	Jackelinne Piccinini	Unplaced	
2005	Ciudad Capital	Karina Estrada	Unplaced	
2004	Izabal	Marva Cecilia Weatherborn	Unplaced	
2003	Sacatepéquez	Florecita de Jesus Cobián	Unplaced	
2002	Zacapa	Carina Maribel Velásquez	Unplaced	
2001	Chiquimula	Rosa María Castañeda	Unplaced	
2000	Jalapa	Evelyn Liseth López	Unplaced	
1999	Sacatepéquez	Monica María Penedo	Unplaced	
1998	Ciudad Capital	Astrid Gabriela Ramírez	Unplaced	
1997	Chiquimula	Carol Anabella Aquino	Unplaced	
1996	Ciudad Capital	Karla Hannelore Beteta	Unplaced	
1995	Ciudad Capital	Indira Lili Chinchilla	Unplaced	
1994	Ciudad Capital	Katya Schoenstedt	Unplaced	
1993	San Marcos	Diana Lucrecia Galvan	Unplaced	
1992	Chiquimula	Nancy Maricela Pérez	Unplaced	
1991	Santa Rosa	María Lorena Palacios	Unplaced	
1990	Ciudad Capital	Marianela Amelia Abate	Unplaced	
1989	Chiquimula	Helka Lisbeth Cuevas	Unplaced	
1988	Ciudad Capital	Silvia Mansilla	Unplaced	
1987	Ciudad Capital	María Isabel Flores	Unplaced	
1986	Alta Verapaz	Christa Kalula Wellman	Unplaced	
1985	Ciudad Capital	Perla Elizabeth Prera	Unplaced	
1984	Jutiapa	Ilma Urrutia	Top 10	
1983	Escuintla	Berta Victoria González	Unplaced	
1982	Ciudad Capital	Edith Suzanne Whitbeck	Unplaced	
1981	Ciudad Capital	Yuma Rossana Lobos	Unplaced	
1980	Alta Verapaz	Lizabeth Iveth Martínez	Unplaced	
1979	Ciudad Capital	Michelle Marie Domínguez	Unplaced	
1978	Ciudad Capital	Claudia María Iriarte	Unplaced	
1977	Did not compete			
1976	Ciudad Capital	Blanca Alicia Montenegro	Unplaced	
1975	Ciudad Capital	Emy Abascal	Unplaced	
Did not compete between 1962—1974
1961	Ciudad Capital	Anabella Sáenz	Unplaced	
1960	Did not compete			
1959	Ciudad Capital	Rogelia Cruz	Unplaced	
1958	Ciudad Capital	Maya Glinz	Unplaced	
1957	Ciudad Capital	Ana Walda Olyslager	Unplaced	
1956	Chiquimula	Ileana Garlinger	Unplaced	
1955	Ciudad Capital	María del Rosario Molina	Top 15	

=== Miss Guatemala Internacional ===
- : Declared the Winner
- : Finished as a runner-up or top 5/6 qualification
- : Finished as one of the finalists or semifinalists
- : Finished as a special awards winner

Year	Province	Miss Guatemala Internacional	Placement at Miss International	Special Awards
2026	Quetzaltenango	Melina Birk	TBA	
2025	Chiquimula	Hilda Gutiérrez	Unplaced	
2024	Izabal	Helen Morales	Unplaced	
2023	Ciudad Capital	María Ranee Díaz	Unplaced	
2022	Huehuetenango	Dulce López	Unplaced	
Due to the impact of COVID-19 pandemic, no competition held between 2020—2021
2019	Quetzaltenango	Stephanie Judith Sical	Unplaced	Best National Costume (Top 7)
2018	Ciudad Capital	Cindy Gabriela Castillo	Unplaced	
2017	Ciudad Capital	Ana Lucía Villagrán	Unplaced	
2016	Ciudad Capital	Laura Vadillo	Unplaced	
2015	Chiquimula	Saida Jerónimo	Did not compete	
2014	Ciudad Capital	Claudia María Herrera	Unplaced	
2013	Baja Verapaz	Sara Guerrero	Unplaced	
2012	Guatemala	Christa García	Unplaced	
2011	Santa Rosa	Karen Lucrecia Remón	Unplaced	
2010	Chimaltenango	Claudia Adriana García	Unplaced	
2009	Did not compete			
2008	Chimaltenango	Wendy Karina Alvizures	Unplaced	
2007	Ciudad Capital	Alida Boer	Unplaced	
2006	Santa Rosa	Mirna Lissy Salguero	Unplaced	
Did not compete between 2004—2005
2003	Santa Rosa	Ana Pamela Díaz	Unplaced	
2002	Suchitepéquez	Evelyn Suceth Arriaga	Unplaced	
2001	Jutiapa	Rosa María Castañeda	Unplaced	
2000	Guatemala	Yasmin Alicia di Maio	Unplaced	
1999	Chiquimula	Gladys Marisol Alvarado	Unplaced	
1998	Did not compete			
1997	Ciudad Capital	Glenda Iracema Cifuentes	Unplaced	
1996	Ciudad Capital	Karla Haneloren Beteta	Unplaced	
1995	Quiché	Indira Lili Chinchilla	Unplaced	
1994	Alta Verapaz	Vivian Mariela Castañeda	Unplaced	
1993	San Marcos	Diana Lucrecia Galván	Top 10	
1992	Petén	Narcy Marisela Pérez	Unplaced	
1991	Izabal	Gloria Elizabeth Comparini	Unplaced	
1990	Petén	Marianela Amelia Abate	Unplaced	
Did not compete between 1986—1989
1985	Chimaltenango	Perla Liseth Prera	Unplaced	
1984	Guatemala	Ilma Urrutia	Miss International 1984	
Did not compete between 1972—1983
1971	Quetzaltenango	Doris Laurice Azurdia	Unplaced	
Did not compete between 1962—1970
1961	Quetzaltenango	Ileana Polasek	Unplaced	

=== Miss Guatemala Supranacional ===
- : Declared the Winner
- : Finished as a runner-up or top 5/6 qualification
- : Finished as one of the finalists or semifinalists
- : Finished as a special awards winner

Year	Province	Miss Guatemala Supranacional	Placement at Miss Supranational	Special Awards
2027	El Progreso	Valentina Estrada	TBA	
2026	Jutiapa	Elizabeth Blanco	Unplaced	
2025	Antigua Guatemala	Tokyo Gonzalo	Top 24	
2024	Alta Verapaz	Andrea Zapeta	Unplaced	
2023	Zacapa	Naida Estubier	Unplaced	
2022	Alta Verapaz	María Fernanda Milián	Top 24	
Due to the impact of COVID-19 pandemic, no competition in 2020
2019	Santa Rosa	Andrea Radford	Top 25	
2018	Ciudad Capital	Stephanie Ogaldez	Unplaced	
Did not compete between 2014—2017
2013	Ciudad Capital	Ana Beatriz Rodas	Unplaced	
Did not compete between 2011—2012
2010	Ciudad Capital	Jennifer Chiong	Unplaced	
2009	Ciudad Capital	Evelyn Suseth Arreaga	Unplaced	
