= Lourdes Figueroa =

Guatemalan actress, model and beauty pageant titleholder

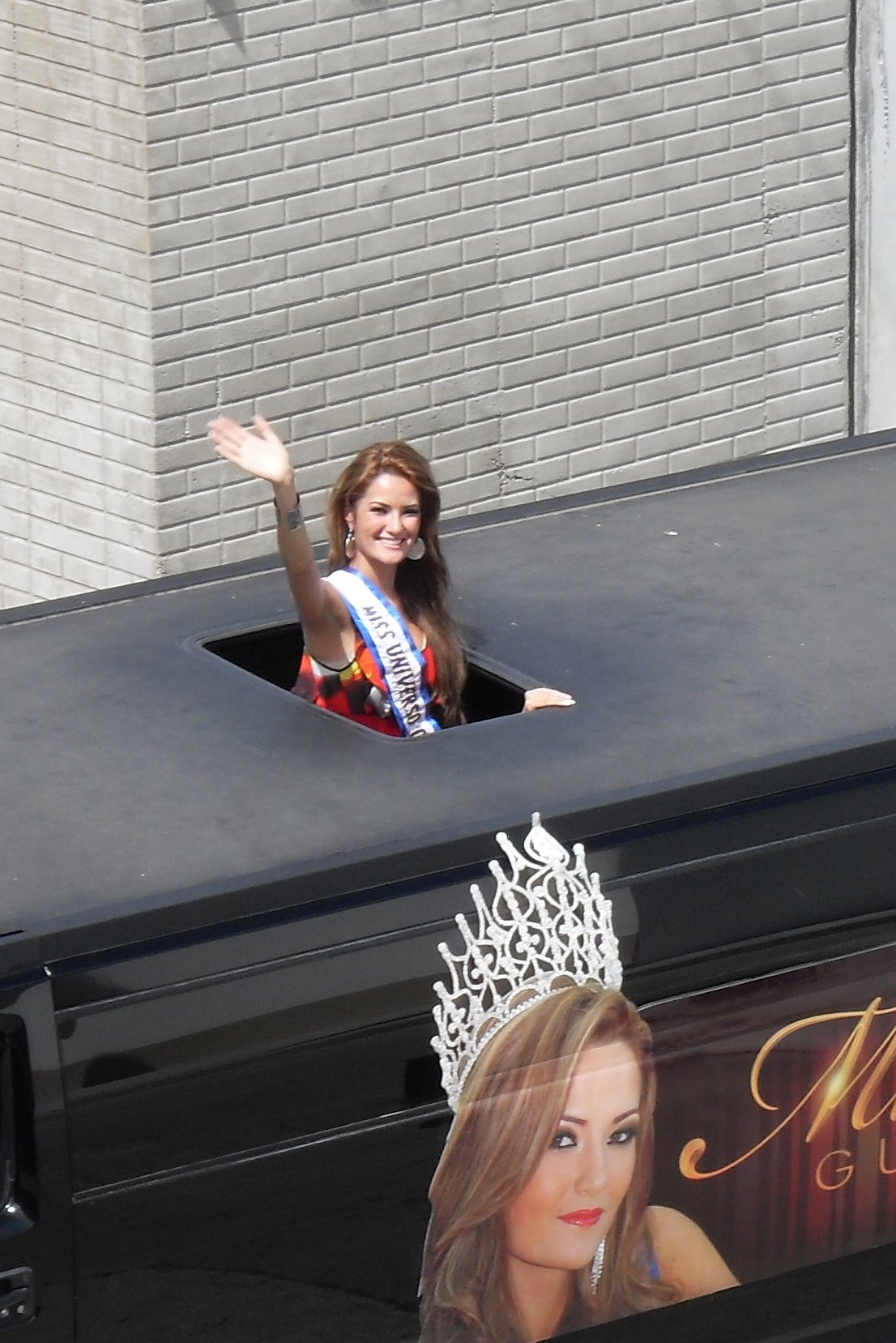
- Lourdes Figueroa (age 21), Miss Guatemala 2009 and Miss World Guatemala 2011
- Born: Lourdes Figueroa; April 21, 1988 (age 38); Guatemala City, Guatemala
- Beauty pageant titleholder
- Title: Miss Guatemala 2009
- Major competitions: Miss Guatemala 2009 (Winner); Miss Universe 2009 (Unplaced); Miss World 2011 (Top 20)

Lourdes Figueroa Araujo (born April 21, 1988) is a Guatemalan actress, model, fashion designer, and beauty pageant titleholder.

== Biography ==
In May 2009, Figueroa was crowned Miss Guatemala 2009 and participated in the Miss Universe 2009 pageant that was broadcast live on NBC, on August 23, 2009.

On August 15, 2009, Figueroa competed against 83 other delegates in the Lazy River Tube Race, where she was victorious.

After competing in Miss Universe 2009, in which she did not place, Figueroa traveled to Miami, Florida, United States, North America, to model there, and was chosen to represent Guatemala at the Miss World 2011, held on November 6. Figueroa finished in the Top 20.
