= Chloe Marshall =

British model (born 1991)

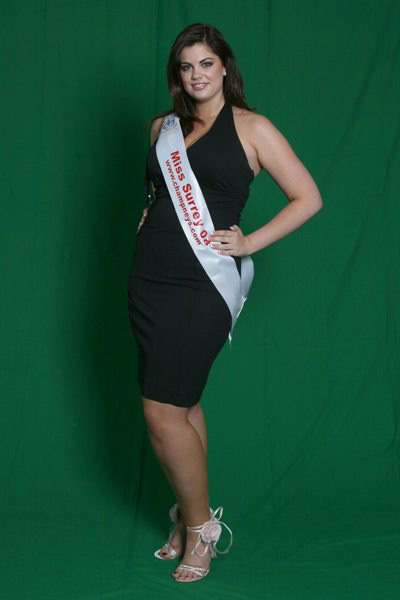
- Marshall in 2008
- Born: Chloe Elizabeth Marshall; 27 March 1991 (age 35); Cranleigh, Surrey, England
- Occupation: Plus-size model
- Modelling information
- Height: 1.78 m (5 ft 10 in)
- Hair colour: Brown
- Eye colour: Blue
- Agency: Jag Models; Ford Models; Bridge Models
- Website: chloemarshall.co.uk

Chloe Elizabeth Marshall (born 27 March 1991) is an English plus-size model. She is from Cranleigh, Surrey. Having won the Miss Surrey title in March 2008, she became the first size 16 (U.S. size 12 to 14) model to reach the finals for the Miss England tiara.

Marshall has stated that she "wanted to go through to the Miss England finals to break the stereotype that you have to be tall and skinny to be considered beautiful." The national finals for the Miss England title were held on 18 July 2008. Marshall came in second place.

Marshall appeared on the cover of Plus Model magazine in March 2010. She signed a three-year contract with Ford Models in early 2010. Marshall has modeled for notable plus-size clothing clients including Macy's and Torrid. She also walked in Lane Bryant's 2011 runway show in Las Vegas.
