= Ana Luisa Montufar =

Guatemalan beauty pageant contestant

Ana Luisa Montufar Urrutia
- Born: June 16, 1993 (age 33); Guatemala City, Guatemala
- Height: 1.75 m (5 ft 9 in)
- Beauty pageant titleholder
- Title: Miss Teen Guatemala 2011; Miss Earth Guatemala 2011; Miss Guatemala 2014
- Hair color: Brown
- Major competitions: Miss Earth Guatemala 2011 (Winner); Miss Earth 2011 (Unplaced); Miss Guatemala 2014 (Winner); Miss Universe 2014 (Unplaced)

Ana Luisa Montufar Urrutia (born June 16, 1993) is a Guatemalan model, environmentalist and beauty pageant titleholder who was crowned Miss Guatemala 2014 and represented Guatemala at the Miss Universe 2014 pageant.

== Early life ==
Montufar became a beauty contestant. She was an environment activist in Guatemala during her title as Miss Earth Guatemala in 2011. She is now working as a model.

== Pageantry ==
=== Miss Teen Guatemala 2011 ===
Ana was crowned as Miss Teen Guatemala and became Guatemalan Ambassador for teenager queen in the country.

=== Miss Earth Guatemala 2011 ===
Ana was crowned as Miss Tierra Guatemala 2011 and competed at Miss Earth 2011 in Manila, Philippines but she failed to reach the Top 16.

=== Miss Guatemala 2014 ===
Ana was crowned Miss Guatemala 2014 and represented Ciudad Capital on May 18, 2014. At the same pageant the runners-up title for Keyla Lisbeth Bermudez and Claudia Herrera were crowned as Miss Mundo Guatemala and Miss Internacional Guatemala 2014.

== Miss Universe 2014 ==
Ana represented Guatemala at the Miss Universe 2014 held on January 25, 2015, but failed to be placed in the Top 15 Semifinalists.

Awards and achievements
Preceded by Paulette Samayoa	Miss Guatemala; 2014	Succeeded by Jeimmy Aburto
Preceded by Sue Ellen Castañeda	Miss Earth Guatemala; 2011	Succeeded by Stefany Miranda
