= Sylvia Namutebi =

- Born: Uganda
- Education: Makerere University Business School (Human Resource Management)
- Occupation: Model
- Years active: 2011 - Present
- Known for: Miss Uganda 2011

Sylvia Wilson Namutebi Alibhai is a Ugandan former model and beauty pageant titleholder. She reigned as Miss Uganda in 2011 and represented Uganda at Miss World later that year.

== Biography ==
Namutebi was born to Paul Ssekuwanda in Wakiso, Uganda. She holds a degree in Human Resources Management from Makerere University Business School.

=== Pageantry ===
Namutebi resigned from her job to contest for Miss Uganda 2011. Namutebi, at the age of 23, beat all the eighteen contestants to take up the crown, replacing Heyzme Nansubuga.

She represented Uganda at Miss World that year. In 2019, she returned to the Miss Uganda pageant as a judge.

=== Personal life ===
She got engaged to Ugandan businessman Ali Alibhai in 2015 and the couple wed in 2017.
