= Patriotic Labour Youth =

Patriotic Labour Youth (Spanish: Juventud Patriótica del Trabajo, abbreviated JPT) was the youth wing of the Guatemalan Party of Labour (PGT) from the late 1950s to 1981. JPT was a member of the World Federation of Democratic Youth (WFDY).

== Founding ==
JPT was founded in the second half of the 1950s, following the banning of PGT after the overthrow of Jacobo Árbenz. Unlike the previous Árbenz-era PGT youth wing, the Democratic Youth Alliance, the JPT was formed as an explicitly communist organization. JPT built a strong presence at universities and high schools.

== Guerrilla struggles ==
The Cuban Revolution had profound impact on the militants of JPT. In 1962 the PGT leadership gathered a group of JPT members in Cuba. The Rebel Armed Forces (FAR) were formed, its first fighters were JPT members who had obtained scholarships to study in Cuba and who had started guerrilla warfare training there (without the blessing of the PGT leadership). In 1965 JPT and PGT took part in forming the Edgar Ibarra Guerrilla Front (FGEI), under the umbrella of FAR and based in Sierra de las Minas.

In 1965 PGT dissolved JPT and 1966 the party included a number JPT leaders in the PGT leadership.

When FAR and PGT parted ways in 1968 a major share of the erstwhile JPT members followed FAR rather than the mother party. In December 1969 PGT set up a Special Commission to reactivate the JPT under its control, but in the immediate years after the PGT-FAR split JPT was largely marginalized.

In the following years, a majority of guerrilla leaders in Guatemala were ex-members of JPT. In particular, many guerrilla leaders had been recruited to JPT through its high school organizations.

== Student activism ==
JPT members were influential in Frente, which emerged as a dominant student organization in San Carlos University in the mid-1970s. Frente won control over the University Students Association (AEU) in 1976 and the successor organizations of Frente held sway in AEU until 1985.

== Dissolution ==
PGT again decided to dissolve JPT in 1981.
