= Virginia Argueta =

Guatemalan model, communicator, and beauty queen

- Born: Virginia Alejandra Argueta Hernández; October 13, 1994 (age 31); Jalpatagua, Jutiapa, Guatemala
- Education: BA in International Relations; Postgraduate in Foreign Trade Management; MBA in Public Administration; MA in Global Affairs
- Occupations: Model, television presenter, communicator
- Years active: 2016–present
- Known for: Beauty pageants, news presenting, Escuela de la Libertad
- Title: Miss Guatemala 2016; Miss World Guatemala 2017

Virginia Alejandra Argueta Hernández (born 13 October 1994) is a Guatemalan model, communicator, and former beauty queen. She was crowned Miss Guatemala 2016 and represented her country at Miss Universe 2016 in the Philippines. In 2017, she was also crowned Miss World Guatemala and competed in Miss World 2017 in China, where she placed in the Top 40.

Her career bridges international beauty pageants with a strong academic background in international relations, public administration, global affairs, and international cooperation. She is also known as a television presenter in Guatemala and founder of the educational project *Escuela de la Libertad*.

== Biography ==
Virginia Argueta was born in Jalpatagua, Jutiapa, Guatemala, on 13 October 1994. From an early age, she excelled academically, frequently appearing on the honor roll.

In 2016, she was crowned Miss Guatemala and represented the country at Miss Universe 2016 in Manila, Philippines. During the event, a costume mishap prevented her from appearing in the National Costume competition, although this did not affect her overall participation.

In 2017, she won the Miss World Guatemala title and competed in Miss World 2017 in Sanya, China, where she placed in the Top 40 among 120 contestants.

== Personal life ==
She is the daughter of Elmer Alejandro Argueta Barrientos, a merchant and former mayor of Jalpatagua, and Norma Virginia Hernández Suárez, a schoolteacher and director in Jalpatagua originally from Villa Canales. She was raised alongside her brother, Omar Alejandro Argueta Hernández, with the support of her maternal grandmother Enma Yolanda Suárez Díaz.

She describes her family as close-knit, with Christian values and conservative principles.

== Education ==
Argueta holds a Bachelor’s degree in International Relations, a Postgraduate specialization in Foreign Trade Management, a Master’s in Public Administration (MBA), and a Master’s in Global Affairs. Her studies have focused on public administration, international trade, multilateral relations, and development cooperation.

== Career ==
=== Media and presenting ===
Argueta works as a television presenter and news anchor for the Guatemalan media outlet *República*, where she covers politics, economics, sustainability, and international affairs. She is recognized for her high-level analysis and verified reporting.

=== Modeling and pageantry ===
Her Miss Guatemala title launched her career in modeling and communication. Following her international representation, she walked at Los Angeles Fashion Week and has appeared in fashion events in Phoenix, New York, Miami, and Los Angeles. She collaborated with the Los Angeles luxury fashion house *For The Stars Fashion House*, known for dressing celebrities such as Nicki Minaj, Paris Hilton, Britney Spears, Christina Aguilera, Gwen Stefani, Thalía, Jennifer Lopez, and Carrie Underwood.

She has also served as a judge at beauty pageants, including Miss Guatemala USA, and has given interviews to international media outlets such as Univision and Telemundo.

=== Institutional work ===
Argueta has worked with the Secretaría de Integración Económica Centroamericana (SIECA) and the Congress of the Republic of Guatemala, focusing on international cooperation and project management. These roles helped strengthen her expertise in regional integration, development, and public policy.

=== Sports and coaching ===
She has practiced skating, basketball, gym training, and indoor cycling. She currently works as an indoor cycling coach, combining her athletic experience with community-building.

=== Social impact and volunteer work ===
Argueta has supported organizations dedicated to children’s welfare, including Anini in Guatemala and the U.S.-based nonprofit *Love & Care for Our Children*.

She is founder and CEO of *Escuela de la Libertad*, an educational initiative in Latin America that promotes civic education, democratic values, family, and individual responsibility. Its mission is to educate and inspire citizens, especially youth, to understand, defend, and promote republican principles as the basis of a just and prosperous society.

== Social vision ==
Argueta emphasizes education, women’s empowerment, and social development as pillars of her vision for Guatemala:

1. **Youth education and leadership:** Programs that strengthen critical thinking, democratic values, and leadership skills.
2. **Women’s empowerment:** Encouraging academic preparation, financial independence, and discipline as tools for women to reach leadership positions.
3. **Social development and sports:** Promoting healthy lifestyles, self-esteem, and active communities through her experience in cooperation and athletics.

== See also ==
- Miss Guatemala 2016
- Miss Universe 2016
- Miss World 2017
