= Ivian Sarcos =

Venezuelan model and beauty queen

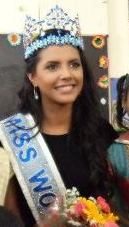
- Born: July 26, 1989 (age 37); Guanare, Portuguesa, Venezuela
- Height: 1.80 m (5 ft 11 in)
- Beauty pageant titleholder
- Title: Miss Amazonas 2010; Miss World Venezuela 2010; Miss World 2011
- Hair color: Brown
- Eye color: Brown
- Major competitions: Miss Venezuela 2010 (Miss World Venezuela) (Most Beautiful Face); Miss World 2011 (Winner) (Miss World Americas)

Ivian Sarcos (born July 26, 1989) is a Venezuelan model and beauty queen who was crowned Miss World 2011 on November 6, 2011, in London, United Kingdom. She is the sixth woman from Venezuela to win the Miss World title, after Jacqueline Aguilera in 1995, and currently the last Venezuelan to win the title.

== Early life ==
Ivian was a diplomacy student at the Central University of Venezuela. Orphaned at the age of eight, Sarcos was raised by nuns in a convent in San Carlos, the capital of Cojedes. She found a new passion in the world of fashion and started her career as a model. Sarcos comes from a family of 12 brothers and sisters.

== Miss Venezuela 2010 ==
Sarcos competed as Miss Amazonas in her country's national beauty pageant, Miss Venezuela 2010, on October 28, 2010, and was crowned Miss World Venezuela. She also won the Most Beautiful Face award.

== Miss World 2011 ==
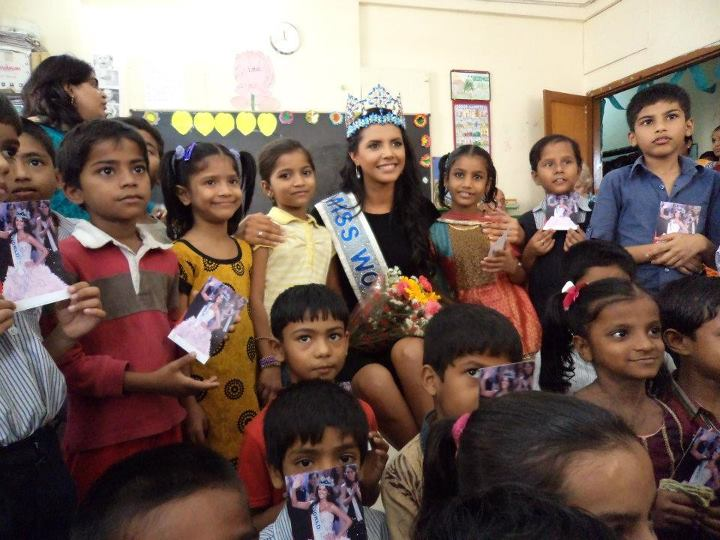
Ivian Sarcos in a school in Mumbai

On November 6, 2011, Sarcos won the 2011 Miss World pageant held in the Earls Court Exhibition Centre in London. She was placed third runner-up during the Miss World Beach Beauty event held on October 29 and fifth-runner-up in Miss World Top Model, also held on October 29, becoming the eventual winner of Miss World 2011 on November 6. She became the sixth woman from Venezuela to capture the title. In a press conference after her victory, she said, "“This has taught me that life, although it may be bad, doesn’t have to end badly. Although I no longer have my parents, it has taught me to be stronger..... I want to carry on doing the wonderful work that ‘Beauty with a Purpose’ and the Miss World organization does and to help people in need.... I want to help people like me." The President of Venezuela, Hugo Chávez, congratulated Sarcos, by telephone and on Twitter. Sarcos was interviewed on Univision for the TV programs Despierta America and Don Francisco Presenta in Miami (USA) and featured in a 7-hour special on Venevision for her return to Venezuela, reaching a 73% share of the viewing audience. A press conference for her victory was held in Caracas with several journalists. She appeared in Hello magazine for the UK and in Look Caras and OK! magazine in Venezuela. On January 4, 2012, President Hugo Chávez received Sarcos with flowers and kissed her hand after their meeting at the Miraflores presidential palace in Caracas and expressed his government's support. Sarcos has a foundation, called Belleza con Proposito (beauty with a purpose), for people in need. On November 16, 2011, she attended Prince Philip, Duke of Edinburgh's birthday lunch. On January 16, 2012, Sarcos was at the Ordos City Ice Festival.

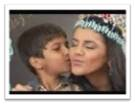
Ivian Sarcos, Miss World 2011, sharing with children

Sarcos was in Ireland for Variety Children's Charity sharing with Brian Ormond. She travelled to Ghana and Kenya from 19 to 28 May for humanitarian works. On June 3, 2012, The Miss World Organization chartered a special boat and joined one of the largest flotillas ever assembled on the River Thames as part of the Queen's official river procession. On board the boat were the Miss World chairman Julia Morley and Sarcos. She later crowned Yu Wenxia from China at Miss World 2012 held in Sanya in China on August 18, 2012.

Awards and achievements
Preceded by (United States) Alexandria Mills	Miss World; 2011	Succeeded by (China) Yu Wenxia
Preceded by (United States) Alexandria Mills	Miss World Americas; 2011	Succeeded by (Brazil) Mariana Notarangelo
Preceded by Adriana Vasini (Zulia)	Miss World Venezuela; 2010	Succeeded by Gabriella Ferrari (Distrito Capital)
Preceded by Jéssica Guillén	Miss Amazonas; 2010	Succeeded by Diana Wood
