= Miss World 2005 =

International beauty pageant

- Miss World 2005 Titlecard
- Date: 10 December 2005
- Presenters: Tim Vincent; Angela Chow
- Entertainment: Alexander O'Neal; Beijing Singing & Dancing Theatre
- Venue: Crown of Beauty Theatre, Sanya, China
- Broadcaster: International: E!; Official broadcaster: China Central Television
- Entrants: 102
- Placements: 15
- Debuts: Martinique; Mongolia
- Withdrawals: Angola; Antigua and Barbuda; Belarus; Cayman Islands; Chile; Curaçao; Egypt; Fiji; Finland; Honduras; Kazakhstan; Lithuania; Paraguay; Turks and Caicos Islands; Zimbabwe
- Returns: Democratic Republic of the Congo; Guatemala; Indonesia; Liberia; Malawi; Swaziland; United States Virgin Islands; Uruguay
- Winner: Unnur Birna Vilhjálmsdóttir; Iceland

Miss World 2005, the 55th edition of the Miss World pageant, was held on 10 December 2005 at the Crown of Beauty Theatre in Sanya, China.

María Julia Mantilla of Peru crowned her successor Unnur Birna Vilhjálmsdóttir of Iceland. 102 contestants from all over the world competed for the crown. All contestants competed in three "fast track" events, Beach Beauty, Miss Talent, and Beauty With a Purpose contests. The winner of each competition immediately became one of the fifteen pageant semi-finalists. She became the third Icelandic woman to win Miss World since Hólmfríður Karlsdóttir in Miss World 1985 and Linda Pétursdóttir in Miss World 1988. The first and second runners-up for this year's edition was Mexico's Dafne Molina Lona and Puerto Rico's Ingrid Marie Rivera.

== Selection of participants ==
=== Replacements ===
Miss South Africa 2005, Claudia Henkel was unable to participate because she had to crown her successor 2 days after the Miss World 2005 contest. She was replaced by Dhiveja Sundrum.

Miss Thailand World 2005, Angela "Aschara" McKay resigned her title just 10 days after winning because she wanted to pursue her studies and modeling work in New York City. the first runner-up of Miss Thailand World 2005, Sirinda "Cindy" Jensen took over the Miss Thailand World 2005 title.

=== Debuts, returns, and, withdrawals ===
This edition marked the debut of Martinique and Mongolia, and the return of the Democratic Republic of the Congo, Guatemala, Indonesia, Liberia, Malawi, Swaziland, the United States Virgin Islands and Uruguay; Indonesia, which last competed in 1983, the Democratic Republic of the Congo (as Zaire) in 1985, Liberia in 1999, Malawi in 2001, the United States Virgin Islands 2002 and Guatemala, Swaziland and Uruguay in 2003.

Saana Johanna Anttila of Finland, withdrew at the last minute after a few days competing for unknown reasons. Claudia Mariza Manuel Santana of Angola withdrew for being homesick. Ol’ga Gerasimovich of Belarus, Rychacviana Coffie of Curaçao, Meriam George of Egypt, Lisa Sáenz of Honduras, Dina Nuraliyeva of Kazakhstan, Emilce Rossana Gómez Cabral of Paraguay, and Kelly Eastwood of Turks and Caicos withdrew for unknown reasons. Lorraine Maphala of Zimbabwe withdrew for financial constraints.

Antigua and Barbuda, the Cayman Islands, Chile, Fiji, and Lithuania withdrew after their respective organizations failed to hold a national competition or appoint a delegate.

== Results ==
=== Placements ===
| Placement | Contestant |
|---|---|
| Miss World 2005 | Iceland – Unnur Birna Vilhjálmsdóttir |
| 1st Runner-Up | Mexico – Dafne Molina Lona |
| 2nd Runner-Up | Puerto Rico – Ingrid Marie Rivera |
| Top 6 | Italy – Sofia Bruscoli; South Korea – Oh Eun-young; Tanzania – Nancy Sumari |
| Top 15 | Canada – Ramona Amiri; India – Sindhura Gadde; Jamaica – Terri-Karelle Griffith; Northern Ireland – Lucy Evangelista; Philippines – Carlene Aguilar; Russia – Yulia Ivanova; South Africa – Dhiveja Sundrum †; Spain – Mireia Verdú; United States Virgin Islands – Kmisha Counts |

==== Continental Queens of Beauty ====
| Continental Group | Contestant |
|---|---|
| Africa | Tanzania – Nancy Sumari |
| Americas | Mexico – Dafne Molina Lona |
| Asia Pacific | South Korea – Oh Eun-young |
| Caribbean | Puerto Rico – Ingrid Marie Rivera |
| Northern Europe | Iceland – Unnur Birna Vilhjálmsdóttir |
| Southern Europe | Italy – Sofia Bruscoli |

== Judges ==
- Julia Morley – Chairwoman of the Miss World Organization
- Denise Perrier – Miss World 1953 from France
- Ann Sidney – Miss World 1964 from United Kingdom
- Lúcia Petterle – Miss World 1971 from Brazil
- Wilnelia Merced – Miss World 1975 from Puerto Rico
- Mariasela Álvarez – Miss World 1982 from Dominican Republic
- Julia Kourotchkina – Miss World 1992 from Russia
- Diana Hayden – Miss World 1997 from India
- Agbani Darego – Miss World 2001 from Nigeria
- Azra Akın – Miss World 2002 from Turkey

== Contestants ==
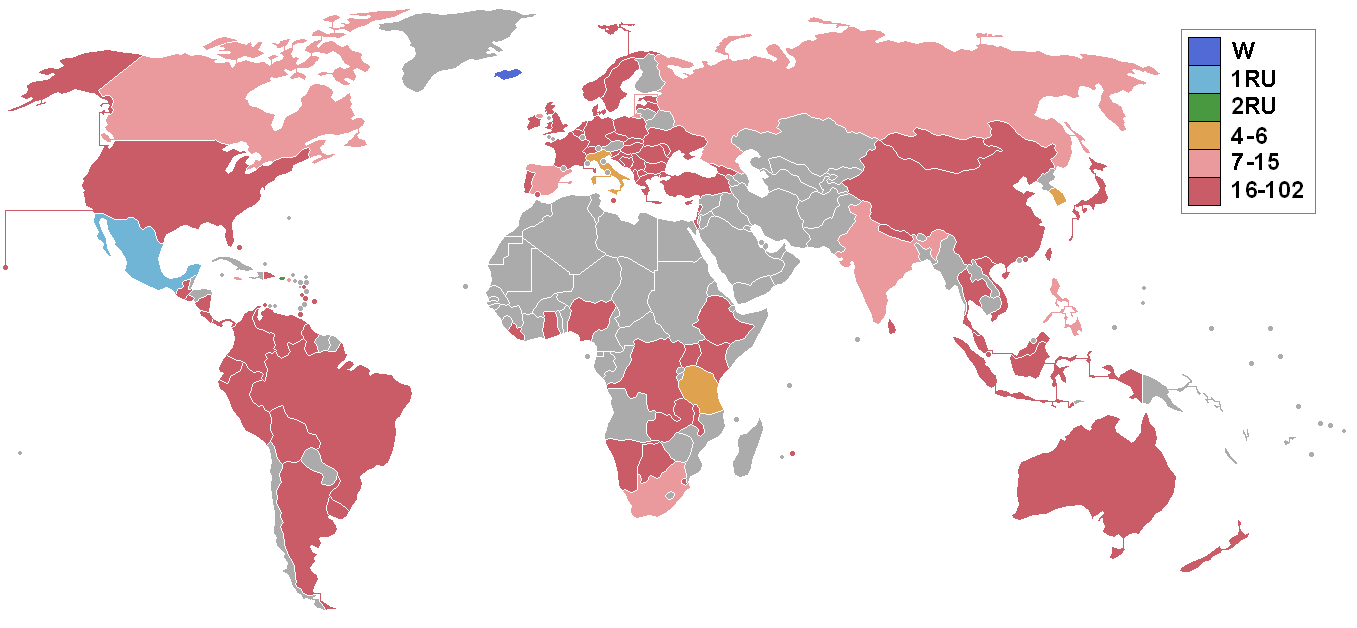
Countries and territories which sent delegates and results for Miss World 2005

102 contestants participated in Miss World 2005

| Country/Territory | Contestant | Age | Hometown | Continental Group |
|---|---|---|---|---|
| Albania | Suada Sherifi | 17 | Vlorë | Southern Europe |
| Argentina | Emilia Iannetta | 19 | Pilar | Americas |
| Aruba | Sarah Juddan | 18 | Oranjestad | Caribbean |
| Australia | Dennae Brunow | 20 | Albury | Asia-Pacific |
| Bahamas | Ordain Moss | 18 | Nassau | Caribbean |
| Barbados | Marielle Onyeche | 21 | Bridgetown | Caribbean |
| Belgium | Tatiana Silva | 20 | Brussels | Northern Europe |
| Bolivia | Viviana Méndez | 19 | Santa Cruz | Americas |
| Bosnia and Herzegovina | Sanja Tunjić | 19 | Tuzla | Southern Europe |
| Botswana | Tshegofatso Robi | 20 | Gaborone | Africa |
| Brazil | Patrícia Reginato | 19 | Medianeira | Americas |
| Bulgaria | Rositsa Ivanova | 18 | Sofia | Southern Europe |
| Canada | Ramona Amiri | 25 | Montreal | Americas |
| China | Ting Ting Zhao | 19 | Beijing | Asia-Pacific |
| Colombia | Erika Querubín | 22 | Medellin | Americas |
| Costa Rica | Leonora Jiménez | 22 | Santa Ana | Americas |
| Croatia | Maja Cvjetković | 19 | Šibenik | Southern Europe |
| Cyprus | Orthodoxia Moutsouri | 20 | Famagusta | Southern Europe |
| Czech Republic | Lucie Králová | 23 | Teplice | Northern Europe |
| Democratic Republic of the Congo | Nelly Dembo | 22 | Kinshasa | Africa |
| Denmark | Trine Lundgaard | 18 | Billund | Northern Europe |
| Dominican Republic | Elisa Abreu | 21 | Jarabacoa | Caribbean |
| Ecuador | Marelisa Márquez | 24 | Guayaquil | Americas |
| El Salvador | Alejandra Cárcamo | 19 | San Salvador | Americas |
| England | Hammasa Kohistani | 17 | London | Northern Europe |
| Estonia | Laura Korgemae | 19 | Tartu | Northern Europe |
| Ethiopia | Seble Mekonnen | 19 | Sayechew | Africa |
| France | Cindy Fabre | 20 | Cosne-sur-Loire | Southern Europe |
| Georgia | Salome Khelashvili | 20 | Tbilisi | Southern Europe |
| Germany | Daniela Risch | 23 | Kiel | Northern Europe |
| Ghana | Inna Mariam Patty | 22 | Accra | Africa |
| Gibraltar | Melanie Chipolina | 23 | Gibraltar | Southern Europe |
| Greece | Katerina Stikoudi | 20 | Thessaloniki | Southern Europe |
| Guadeloupe | Merita Melyna | 23 | Les Abymes Town | Caribbean |
| Guatemala | María Inés Gálvez | 24 | Guatemala City | Americas |
| Guyana | Jasmine Herzog | 18 | Annandale | Americas |
| Hong Kong | Tracy Ip | 24 | Hong Kong | Asia-Pacific |
| Hungary | Semmi-Kis Tünde | 20 | Budapest | Southern Europe |
| Iceland | Unnur Birna Vilhjálmsdóttir | 21 | Seltjarnarnes | Northern Europe |
| India | Sindhura Gadde | 21 | Vijayawada | Asia-Pacific |
| Indonesia | Lindi Cistia Prabha | 21 | Yogyakarta | Asia-Pacific |
| Ireland | Aoife Cogan | 24 | Dublin | Northern Europe |
| Israel | Keren Shaham | 19 | Kiryat Motzkin | Southern Europe |
| Italy | Sofia Bruscoli | 17 | Emilia-Romagna | Southern Europe |
| Jamaica | Terri-Karelle Griffith | 23 | Kingston | Caribbean |
| Japan | Erina Shinohara | 22 | Fuji | Asia-Pacific |
| Kenya | Cecilia Mwangi | 21 | Nairobi | Africa |
| Latvia | Valerija Sevcuka | 20 | Riga | Northern Europe |
| Lebanon | Lamitta Frangieh | 25 | Beirut | Southern Europe |
| Liberia | Snoti Muna Forh | 23 | Monrovia | Africa |
| Macedonia | Milena Stanivuković | 20 | Skopje | Southern Europe |
| Malawi | Rachel Landson | 20 | Lilongwe | Africa |
| Malaysia | Emmeline Ng | 23 | Kuala Lumpur | Asia-Pacific |
| Malta | Ferdine Fava | 19 | St. Julian's | Southern Europe |
| Martinique | Moana Robinel | 24 | Fort-de-France | Caribbean |
| Mauritius | Meenakshi Shivani | 24 | Port Louis | Africa |
| Mexico | Dafne Molina Lona | 23 | Mexico City | Americas |
| Moldova | Irina Dolovova | 21 | Chișinău | Southern Europe |
| Mongolia | Khongorzul Ganbat | 17 | Ulaanbaatar | Asia-Pacific |
| Namibia | Leefa Shiikwa | 23 | Tsumeb | Africa |
| Nepal | Sugarika Kshatriya-Chhetri | 19 | Lalitpur | Asia-Pacific |
| Netherlands | Monique Plat | 23 | Volendam | Northern Europe |
| New Zealand | Kay Anderson | 20 | Auckland | Asia-Pacific |
| Nicaragua | Johanna Madrigal | 21 | Managua | Americas |
| Nigeria | Omowunmi Akinnifesi | 18 | Lagos | Africa |
| Northern Ireland | Lucy Evangelista | 19 | Portglenone | Northern Europe |
| Norway | Helene Tråsavik | 19 | Egersund | Northern Europe |
| Panama | Anna Vaprio | 21 | Panama City | Americas |
| Peru | Fiorella Castellano | 18 | Lima | Americas |
| Philippines | Carlene Aguilar | 23 | Mandaluyong | Asia-Pacific |
| Poland | Malwina Ratajczak | 19 | Krapkowice | Northern Europe |
| Portugal | Ângela Maria Fonseca Spínola | 20 | Setúbal | Southern Europe |
| Puerto Rico | Ingrid Marie Rivera | 22 | Luquillo | Caribbean |
| Romania | Raluca Voina | 20 | Câmpulung | Southern Europe |
| Russia | Yulia Ivanova | 22 | Novosibirsk | Northern Europe |
| Saint Lucia | Joy Matty | 19 | Castries | Caribbean |
| Scotland | Aisling Friel | 23 | Glasgow | Northern Europe |
| Serbia and Montenegro | Dina Džanković | 19 | Novi Pazar | Southern Europe |
| Singapore | Shenise Wong Yan Yi | 23 | Singapore | Asia-Pacific |
| Slovakia | Ivica Sláviková | 21 | Bratislava | Southern Europe |
| Slovenia | Sanja Grohar | 21 | Kranj | Southern Europe |
| South Africa | Dhiveja Sundrum † | 23 | Pietermaritzburg | Africa |
| South Korea (Note: Competed as Korea in the pageant) | Oh Eun-young | 20 | Seoul | Asia-Pacific |
| Spain | Mireia Verdú | 22 | Barcelona | Southern Europe |
| Sri Lanka | Nadeeka Perera | 22 | Colombo | Asia-Pacific |
| Swaziland | Zinhle Magongo | 20 | Mhlume | Africa |
| Sweden | Liza Berggren | 19 | Mölndal | Northern Europe |
| Switzerland | Lauriane Gilliéron | 21 | Prilly | Northern Europe |
| Taiwan (Note: Competed as Chinese Taipei in the pageant) | Su-Jung Hsu | 25 | Kaohsiung | Asia-Pacific |
| Tanzania | Nancy Sumari | 19 | Arusha | Africa |
| Thailand | Sirinda Jensen | 22 | Phra Nakhon Si Ayutthaya | Asia-Pacific |
| Trinidad and Tobago | Jenna Marie Andre | 22 | San Fernando | Caribbean |
| Turkey | Hande Subaşı | 21 | Ankara | Southern Europe |
| Uganda | Juliet Ankakwatsa | 22 | Kabale | Africa |
| Ukraine | Yulia Pinchuk | 18 | Novovolynsk | Northern Europe |
| United States | Lisette Diaz | 22 | San Diego | Americas |
| United States Virgin Islands (Note: Competed as American Virgin Islands in the pageant) | Kmisha Counts | 18 | Saint Thomas | Caribbean |
| Uruguay | Daniela Tambasco | 20 | Montevideo | Americas |
| Venezuela | Susan Carrizo | 21 | Lagunillas | Americas |
| Vietnam | Vũ Hương Giang | 20 | Hanoi | Asia-Pacific |
| Wales | Claire Evans | 22 | Aberystwyth | Northern Europe |
| Zambia | Precious Kabungo Mumbi | 23 | Lusaka | Africa |

== Notes ==
=== Withdraws ===
No Shows

- Algeria – Nesrine Melbani
- Andorra – Lourdes Fernández
- Kazakhstan – Miss Kazakhstan 2005, Dina Nuraliyeva did not compete for unknown reasons. However she participated in Miss Universe 2006 and Miss World 2009 where she became Top 16.
- Macau – Cheong Wai Nei
- Paraguay – Emilce Rossana Gómez Cabral
- Tahiti – Rhea Bessette
- Togo – Edwige Grace Madzé Badakou – Due to lack of Sponsorship and visa problems. She won Miss World Cup 2006 later.
- Turks and Caicos Islands – Kelly Eastwood
- Zimbabwe – Due to lack of Sponsorship and visa problems. However she participated a year later at Miss World 2006.

=== Replacements ===
- Cyprus – Nicole Temené
- Germany – Antonia Schmitz
