= Cieślik =

Cieślik (Polish pronunciation: [ˈtɕɛɕlik]) is a Polish surname. Notable people with the surname include:

- Gerard Cieślik (1927–2013), Polish footballer
- Marzena Cieślik (born 1981), Polish model and beauty pageant winner
- Paweł Cieślik (born 1986), Polish cyclist
