= Ambuyah Ebanks =

- Born: c. 1985; West Bay, Grand Cayman, Cayman Islands
- Occupations: Model, beauty pageant titleholder
- Known for: Miss Cayman Islands 2006

Ambuyah Ebanks (born c. 1985) is a Caymanian model and beauty pageant titleholder who won the Miss Cayman Islands 2006. Born to an American mother and a Caymanian father, Ambuyah spent the early years of her childhood growing up in West Bay, Grand Cayman, Cayman Islands. She attended high school in the United States.

At a reception hosted by the Cayman Islands' Governor Stuart Jack on February 20, 2006, she had the opportunity to meet the Premier of Bermuda, Hon. W. Alex Scott JP, MP and his wife Mrs. Olga Scott during their first visit to the Cayman Islands and she gained valuable exposure to regional matters.

Ambuyah competed in the 2006 Miss Universe pageant which was held in Los Angeles, California in July 2006, & in the 2006 Miss World pageant held in Warsaw, Poland in October 2006
