= Miss World Zimbabwe =

Beauty pageant

- Formation: 1980
- Type: Beauty pageant
- Headquarters: Harare
- Location: Zimbabwe
- Members: Miss World
- Official language: English
- National Director: Patience Muzanenhamo-Lusengo
- Website: Official page

Miss World Zimbabwe is a Beauty pageant to select a delegate for Miss World pageant. This pageant is related to Miss Zimbabwe contest.

== History ==
Miss Zimbabwe was founded in 1980 when the national beauty pageant was transformed from Miss Rhodesia after attaining independence. This is not just any beauty contest but that of national value.

== Titleholders ==
Color key

- Declared as Winner
- Ended as runner-up
- Ended as one of the finalists or semifinalists

The winner of Miss World Zimbabwe represents her country at Miss World. On occasion, when the winner does not qualify (due to age) for either contest, a runner-up is sent.

Year	Miss Zimbabwe	Hometown	Placement	Special awards	Notes
2027	TBA	TBA	TBA		
2026	Brunette Makanyiso	Harare	Top 12		
2025	Courtney Jongwe	Mutare	Top 40	Top 32 at Miss World Sport; Top 20 at Multimedia	
2023	Nokutenda Marumbwa	Bulawayo	Top 40	Winner at Head-to-Head challenge	
Did not compete in 2019 due to the country's economic crisis which caused the Miss World Zimbabwe 2019 final to be cancelled.
2018	Belinda Potts	Harare	Unplaced		
2017	Chiedza Mhosva	Harare	Unplaced	Top 20 at Beauty with a Purpose	
Did not compete in 2016
2015	Annie-Grace Mutambu	Harare	Unplaced	Top 10 at Beauty with a Purpose	1st runner-up at Miss Zimbabwe 2015
2014	Tendai Hunda	Chitungwiza	Unplaced	Top 20 at Miss World Top Model	4th runner-up Miss Intercontinental 2015
Did not compete in 2013
2012	Bongani Dhlakama	Bulawayo	Unplaced		
2011	Malaika Maidei Mushandu	Harare	Top 15		
2010	Samantha Tshuma	Bulawayo	Unplaced		
2009	Vanessa Gayle Sibanda	Bulawayo	Unplaced		
2008	Cynthia Maideyi Muvirimi	Harare	Unplaced		
2007	Caroline Marufu	Bulawayo	Unplaced		
2006	Lorraine Tsoanele Maphala	Bulawayo	Unplaced		
2005	Precious Kabungo Mumbi	Harare	Unplaced		
2004	Oslie Muringai	Harare	Unplaced		
2003	Phoebe Tonderai Monjane	Harare	Unplaced		
2002	Linda Van Beek	Harare	Unplaced		
2001	Nokuthula Mpuli	Harare	Unplaced		
2000	Victoria Moyo	Harare	Unplaced		
1999	Brita Masalethulini	Bulawayo	Unplaced		
1998	Annette Kambarami	Harare	Unplaced		
1997	Una Patel	Harare	Unplaced		
1996	Nomsa Ndiweni	Harare	Unplaced		
1995	Dionne Best	Harare	Unplaced		
1994	Angeline Musasiwa	Harare	3rd Runner-up		
1993	Karen Amanda Stally	Harare	Unplaced		
Did not compete between 1983 and 1992
1982	Caroline Murinda	Harare	Top 15		
1981	Juliet Nyathi	Harare	Top 15		
1980	Shirley Richard Nyanyiwa	Harare	Top 15		

== See also ==
- Miss Zimbabwe
