= Sara Lawrence (disambiguation) =

Sara Lawrence was a beauty pageant contestant.

Sara Lawrence may also refer to:

- Sara Lawrence (writer)
- Sara Lawrence-Lightfoot

== See also ==
- Sarah Lawrence (disambiguation)
