= Sabrina Houssami =

Australian actress and model (born 1986)

- Born: Sabrina Houssami; 3 July 1986 (age 40); Sydney, Australia
- Height: 1.72 m (5 ft 8 in)
- Beauty pageant titleholder
- Title: Miss World Australia 2006
- Hair color: Black
- Eye color: Brown
- Major competitions: Miss World Australia 2006 (Winner); Miss World 2006 (2nd Runner-up)

Sabrina Houssami (Arabic: صابرينا حسامي; born 3 July 1986) is an Australian actress, model and beauty pageant titleholder who won Miss World Australia 2006, as well as Miss World Asia Pacific and second second runner up at Miss World 2006. She gained the national title although she did not officially win the national competition. The Miss World Australia organisation cancelled the pageant for that year, due to the Miss World pageant being postponed for 3 months, and gave Houssami the title directly as she was the previous year's runner up.

Houssami was born in the city of Sydney, initially lived in the Sydney suburb of Kemps Creek, and eventually moved to the riverside suburb of Georges Hall. She attended Sefton High School for her secondary education. She comes from a multicultural heritage. Her mother Alka is an Indian Hindu from Delhi and her father Ahmad is a Lebanese Muslim

Houssami was a liberal studies student majoring in psychology and English at the University of Sydney.

She represented Australia at Miss World 2006 and placed third, taking the second runner up position, as well as winning the title Miss World Asia Pacific. She also tied with Miss India World to make the semi-finals. Both of them had the same scores from the judges.

Houssami handed over the Miss World Australia crown on 4 April 2007.

She appeared on the first series of the Australian version of The Apprentice, which began in September 2009. She was fired on 16 November 2009, finishing in fifth place.

== Awards and title ==
=== 2006 ===
- Miss World Australia 2006
- Miss World Asia Pacific 2006
- Miss World 2006 second runner-up
- Miss Grand Slam 2006

Preceded by (Puerto Rico) Ingrid Marie Rivera	Miss World 2nd Runner-Up; 2006	Succeeded by (Mexico) Carolina Moran Gordillo
Preceded by Eun Young Oh	Miss World Asia Pacific; 2006	Succeeded by Zhang Zilin
