= Miss World 2006 =

56th edition of the Miss World pageant

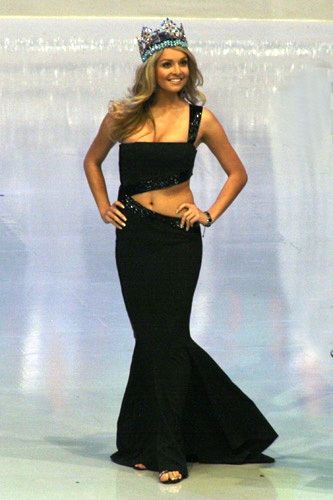
- Miss World 2006, Taťána Kuchařová
- Date: 30 September 2006
- Presenters: Tim Vincent; Angela Chow; Grażyna Torbicka
- Entertainment: Westlife; Robin Gibb; Amici
- Venue: Palace of Culture and Science, Warsaw, Poland
- Broadcaster: Official broadcaster: TVP; International: E!; Challenge
- Entrants: 104
- Placements: 17
- Debuts: Cambodia; Montenegro; Serbia
- Withdrawals: Albania; Malawi; Nepal; New Zealand; Nicaragua; Serbia and Montenegro; Swaziland; Switzerland; Taiwan; Uganda; United States Virgin Islands
- Returns: Angola; Austria; Belarus; Cayman Islands; Chile; Curaçao; Finland; French Polynesia; Kazakhstan; Zimbabwe
- Winner: Taťána Kuchařová; Czech Republic

Miss World 2006 was the 56th edition of the Miss World pageant, held at the Sala Kongresowa, a theatre at the Palace of Culture and Science in Warsaw, Poland, on 30 September 2006. It was the first time ever that the pageant was held in the Continental Europe and a European city other than London.

At the end of the event, Taťána Kuchařová of the Czech Republic was crowned Miss World 2006 by the previous winner, Unnur Birna Vilhjálmsdóttir of Iceland. This is the first time the Czech Republic won the title of Miss World, and its first crown in the Big Four international beauty pageants. The first and second runners-up was Romania's Ioana Boitor and Australia's Sabrina Houssami.

A total of 104 countries competed in the pageant.

== Background ==
=== Location ===
Gdynia was the host of the Beach Beauty contest, Giżycko hosted the Miss Sports contest and Wrocław hosted the Miss Talent competition. The fourth event was Beauty with a Purpose.

=== Selection of participants ===
Contestants from 104 countries and territories were selected to compete in the pageant.

==== Replacements ====
Miss France 2004, Laetitia Bleger was appointed to represent France at Miss World 2006, but however her Playboy pictures of May 2005 prevented her from taking part and she got suspended for 6 months by the Miss France Organization. Then the Miss France committee named the new Miss France 2006, Alexandra Rosenfeld as the French representative in Miss World 2006, but due to the fact that she had to go first to Miss Universe 2006 and later to Miss Europe 2006 contest, was finally replaced by her second runner-up, Laura Fasquel.

Miss Latvia 2005, Kristīne Djadenko was supposed to participate in Miss World 2006. However a month before the start of the competition was replaced by Līga Meinarte. Nevertheless, Djadenko participated next year at Miss World 2007.

Miss España 2006, Elizabeth Reyes was supposed to participate in Miss World 2006 after the Miss Universe 2006 contest. However she was replaced by her first runner-up, Inmaculada Torres.

==== Debuts, returns, and, withdrawals ====
This edition marked the debut of Cambodia, Montenegro and Serbia, and the return of Angola, Austria, Belarus, Cayman Islands, Chile, Curaçao, Finland, French Polynesia, Kazakhstan and Zimbabwe; Austria, which last competed in 2001, French Polynesia (as Tahiti) in 2002 and Angola, Belarus, Cayman Islands, Chile, Curaçao, Finland, Kazakhstan and Zimbabwe in 2004.

Albania, Malawi, Nepal, New Zealand, Nicaragua, Serbia and Montenegro, Swaziland, Switzerland, Taiwan, Uganda, and the United States Virgin Islands, withdrew from the competition.

== Results ==
=== Placements ===
Placement	Contestant
Miss World 2006	Czech Republic – Taťána Kuchařová
1st Runner-Up	Romania – Ioana Boitor
2nd Runner-Up	Australia – Sabrina Houssami
Top 6	Angola – Stiviandra Oliveira; Brazil – Jane Borges; Jamaica – Sara Lawrence
Top 17	Canada – Malgosia Majewska; Ghana – Lamisi Mbillah; India – Natasha Suri; Lebanon – Annabella Hilal; Mexico – Karla Jiménez; Namibia – Anna Nashandi; Northern Ireland – Catherine Milligan; Puerto Rico – Thebyam Carrión; Scotland – Nicola McLean; Venezuela – Federica Guzmán; Vietnam – Mai Phương Thúy

==== Continental Queens of Beauty ====
Continental Group	Contestant
Africa	Angola – Stiviandra Oliveira
Americas	Brazil – Jane Borges
Asia Pacific	Australia – Sabrina Houssami
Caribbean	Jamaica – Sara Lawrence
Northern Europe	Czech Republic – Taťána Kuchařová
Southern Europe	Romania – Ioana Boitor

=== Special awards ===
==== Best World Dress Designer ====
Results	Contestant
Winner	Croatia – Ivana Ergić
1st Runner-up	Netherlands – Sheryl Baas
2nd Runner-up	India – Natasha Suri
3rd Runner-up	Kenya – Khadijah Kiptoo
4th Runner-up	Ireland – Sarah Morrissey
Top 20	Angola – Stiviandra Oliveira; Aruba – Shanandoa Wijshijer; Barbados – Latoya McDowald; China – Duo Liu; Colombia – Elizabeth Loaiza; Czech Republic – Taťána Kuchařová; Dominican Republic – Paola Torres; Italy – Elizaveta Migatcheva; Lebanon – Annabella Hilal; Mauritius – Vanesha Seetohul; Poland – Marzena Cieślik; Romania – Ioana Boitor; United States – Brooke Angus; Venezuela – Federica Guzmán; Vietnam – Mai Phương Thúy

== Challenge Events ==
=== Fast Track Events ===
During the month of September four competitions were held from which the winner of each was fast tracked into the semi-finals. Beach Beauty was selected on 7 September in the city of Gdynia. Miss Sports was held on 12 September in the city of Gizycko and the Miss Talent contest was celebrated on 20 September at Wrocław. The Beauty with a Purpose winner was announced on 30 September during the final telecast.

==== Beach Beauty ====
Results	Contestant
Winner	Venezuela – Federica Guzmán
1st Runner-up	Czech Republic – Taťána Kuchařová
2nd Runner-up	India – Natasha Suri
3rd Runner-up	Angola – Stiviandra Oliveira
4th Runner-up	Singapore – Colleen Pereira
Top 10	Barbados – Latoya McDowald; Poland – Marzena Cieślik; Romania – Ioana Boitor; Scotland – Nicola McLean; Spain – Inmaculada Torres
Top 25	Bolivia – Ana María Ortiz; Bosnia and Herzegovina – Azra Gazdić; Brazil – Jane Borges; Canada – Malgosia Majewska; Colombia – Elizabeth Loaiza; Georgia – Nino Kalandadze; Ireland – Sarah Morrissey; Italy – Elizaveta Migatcheva; Jamaica – Sara Lawrence; Nigeria – Abiola Bashorun; Panama – Gisselle Bissot; Philippines – Anna Maris Igpit; Puerto Rico – Thebyam Carrión; Slovenia – Iris Mulej; Sweden – Cathrin Skoog

==== Miss Sports ====
Results	Contestant
Winner	Canada – Malgosia Majewska
1st Runner-up	Puerto Rico – Thebyam Carrión
2nd Runner-up	Latvia – Liga Meinarte
Top 24	Botswana – Lorato Tebogo; Cayman Islands – Ambuyah Ebanks; Finland – Jenniina Tuokko; Guatemala – Jackelinne Piccinini; Hungary – Renata Toth; Indonesia – Kristania Virginia Besouw; Italy – Elizaveta Migatcheva; Japan – Kazuha Kondo; Kazakhstan – Sabina Chukayeva; Malaysia – Adeline Wan; Mexico – Karla Jiménez; Mongolia – Selenge Erdene-Ochir; Montenegro – Ivana Knežević; Namibia – Anna Nashandi; Russia – Alexandra Mazur; Slovakia – Magdalena Sebestova; South Africa – Thuli Sithole; South Korea – Sharon Park; Trinidad and Tobago – Tineke de Freitas; United States – Brooke Angus; Zambia – Katanekwa Matundwelo

Groups	Contestant
Group 1: Asia Pacific	Indonesia – Kristania Virginia Besouw; Japan – Kazuha Kondo; Mongolia – Selenge Erdene-Ochir; South Korea – Sharon Park
Group 2: Northern Europe	Finland – Jenniina Tuokko; Kazakhstan – Sabina Chukayeva; Latvia – Liga Meinarte; Russia – Alexandra Mazur
Group 3: Southern Europe	Hungary – Renata Toth; Italy – Elizaveta Migatcheva; Montenegro – Ivana Knežević; Slovakia – Magdalena Sebestova
Group 4: Caribbean	Cayman Islands – Ambuyah Ebanks; Martinique – Stephanie Colosse; Puerto Rico – Thebyam Carrión; Trinidad and Tobago – Tineke de Freitas
Group 5: Americas	Canada – Malgosia Majewska; Guatemala – Jackelinne Piccinini; Mexico – Karla Jiménez; United States – Brooke Angus
Group 6: Africa	Botswana – Lorato Tebogo; Namibia – Anna Nashandi; South Africa – Thuli Sithole; Zambia – Katanekwa Matundwelo

==== Miss Talent ====
Results	Contestant
Winner	Northern Ireland – Catherine Jean Milligan
1st Runner-up	Italy – Elizaveta Migatcheva
2nd Runner-up	Zimbabwe – Lorraine Maphala
3rd Runner-up	Estonia – Leisi Poldsam
4th Runner-up	Mongolia – Selenge Erdene-Ochir
Top 10	Barbados – Latoya McDowald; Croatia – Ivana Ergić; India – Natasha Suri; Liberia – Patrice Juah; Portugal – Sara Almeida

==== Beauty with a Purpose ====
Result	Contestant
Winner	Ghana – Lamisi Mbillah

== Judges ==
- Julia Morley – Chairwoman of the Miss World Organization
- Aneta Kręglicka – Miss World 1989 from Poland
- Denise van Outen – Actress and TV presenter
- Karan Johar – Leading Indian director known worldwide for his award-winning movies
- Kelly Holmes – British multiple Olympic gold medalist
- Krish Naidoo – Miss World International Ambassador
- Louis Walsh – Irish entertainment manager behind some of the world's leading pop acts
- Mike Dixon – West End and Broadway award-winner musical director
- Wilnelia Merced – Miss World 1975 from Puerto Rico

== Contestants ==
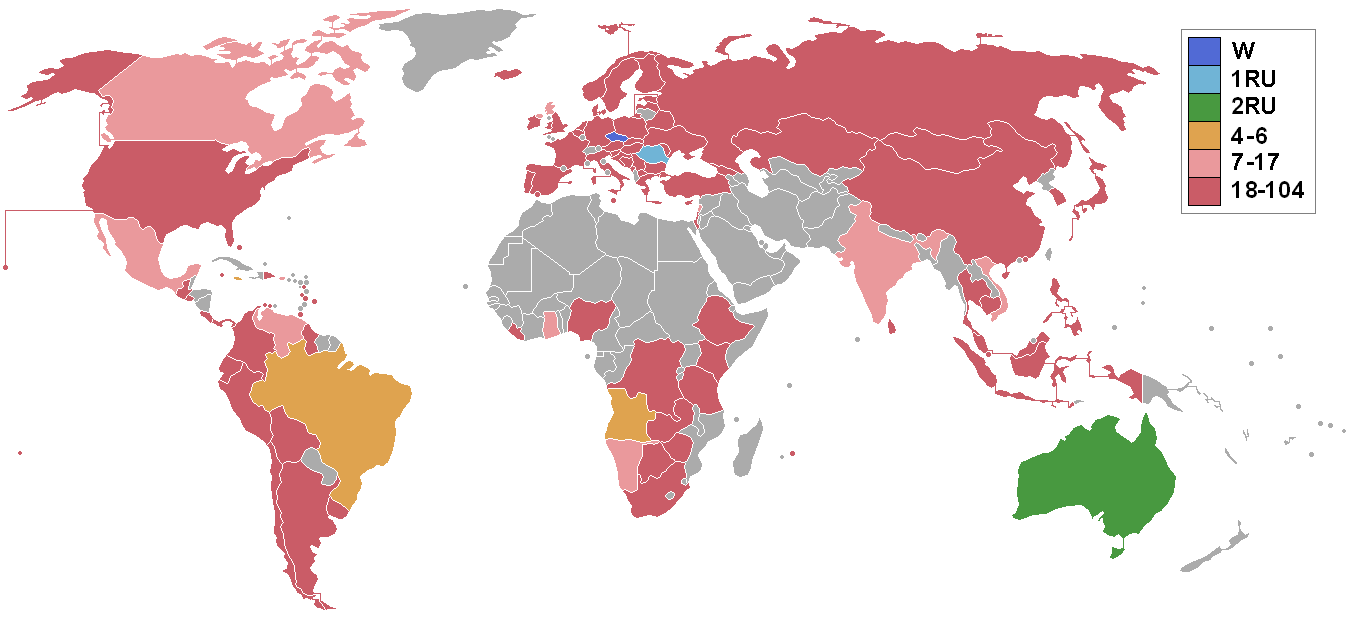
Countries and territories which sent delegates and results

104 contestants competed for the title.

Country/Territory	Contestant	Age (Note: Ages at the time of the pageant)	Hometown	Continental Group
Angola	Stiviandra Oliveira	18	Huíla	Africa
Argentina	Beatriz Vallejos	19	Corrientes	Americas
Aruba	Shanandoa Wijshijer	19	Santa Cruz	Caribbean
Australia	Sabrina Houssami	20	Kemps Creek	Asia-Pacific
Austria	Tatjana Batinić	20	Vienna	Northern Europe
Bahamas	Deandrea Conliffe	24	New Providence	Caribbean
Barbados	Latoya McDowald	17	Applewhaites	Caribbean
Belarus	Katsiaryna Litvinava	22	Mogilev	Northern Europe
Belgium	Virginie Claes	23	Herk-de-Stad	Northern Europe
Bolivia	Ana María Ortiz	17	Beni	Americas
Bosnia and Herzegovina	Azra Gazdić	17	Tuzla	Southern Europe
Botswana	Lorato Tebogo	21	Ramotswa	Africa
Brazil	Jane Borges	21	Goiânia	Americas
Bulgaria	Slavena Vatova	17	Sofia	Southern Europe
Cambodia	Sun Sreymom	22	Kampong Cham	Asia-Pacific
Canada	Malgosia Majewska	24	Toronto	Americas
Cayman Islands	Ambuyah Ebanks	21	West Bay	Caribbean
Chile	Constanza Silva	20	Santiago	Americas
China	Duo Liu	24	Beijing	Asia-Pacific
Colombia	Elizabeth Loaiza	18	Cali	Americas
Costa Rica	Bélgica Arias	22	San José	Americas
Croatia	Ivana Ergić	19	Šibenik	Southern Europe
Curaçao	Fyrena Martha	20	Willemstad	Caribbean
Cyprus	Eli Manoli	18	Nicosia	Southern Europe
Czech Republic	Taťána Kuchařová	18	Opočno	Northern Europe
Democratic Republic of the Congo	Diane Mwinga	23	Lubumbashi	Africa
Denmark	Sandra Spohr	19	Allerød	Northern Europe
Dominican Republic	Paola Torres	21	Santiago	Caribbean
Ecuador	Rebeca Flores	23	Cuenca	Americas
El Salvador	Tatiana Romero	20	San Salvador	Americas
England	Eleanor Glynn	20	Oxford	Northern Europe
Estonia	Leisi Poldsam	19	Tartu	Northern Europe
Ethiopia	Amleset Muchie	19	Addis Ababa	Africa
Finland	Jenniina Tuokko	17	Nousiainen	Northern Europe
France	Laura Fasquel	19	Toulouse	Southern Europe
French Polynesia (Note: Competed as Tahiti in the pageant)	Vainui Simon	20	Papeete	Asia-Pacific
Georgia	Nino Kalandaze	17	Tbilisi	Southern Europe
Germany	Edita Orašćanin	17	Dortmund	Northern Europe
Ghana	Lamisi Mbillah	23	Bawku	Africa
Gibraltar	Hayley O'Brien	20	Gibraltar	Southern Europe
Greece	Irini Karra	20	Karditsa	Southern Europe
Guadeloupe	Caroline Beavis	21	Basse-Terre	Caribbean
Guatemala	Jackelinne Piccinini	22	Mazatenango	Americas
Guyana	Dessia Braithwaite	24	Bartica	Americas
Hong Kong	Janet Chow	23	Hong Kong	Asia-Pacific
Hungary	Renáta Tóth	21	Budapest	Southern Europe
Iceland	Ásdís Hallgrímsdóttir	19	Ísafjörður	Northern Europe
India	Natasha Suri	22	Mumbai	Asia-Pacific
Indonesia	Kristania Besouw	21	Manado	Asia-Pacific
Ireland	Sarah Morrissey	24	Dublin	Northern Europe
Israel	Yael Nizri	18	Kiryat Shmona	Southern Europe
Italy	Elizaveta Migatcheva	17	Rome	Southern Europe
Jamaica	Sara Lawrence	21	Kingston	Caribbean
Japan	Kazuha Kondo	21	Tochigi	Asia-Pacific
Kazakhstan	Sabina Chukayeva	18	Karaganda	Northern Europe
Kenya	Khadijah Kiptoo	21	Nairobi	Africa
Latvia	Līga Meinarte	24	Talsi	Northern Europe
Lebanon	Annabella Hilal	20	Ain El Remmaneh	Southern Europe
Liberia	Patrice Juah	21	Monrovia	Africa
Macedonia	Marija Vegova	18	Gevgelija	Southern Europe
Malaysia	Adeline Wan	23	Kuala Lumpur	Asia-Pacific
Malta	Solange Mifsud	23	Żabbar	Southern Europe
Martinique	Stéphanie Colosse	19	Fort-de-France	Caribbean
Mauritius	Vanesha Seetohul	22	Quatre Bornes	Africa
Mexico	Karla Jiménez	23	Puebla	Americas
Moldova	Alexandra Demciuk	17	Bălți	Southern Europe
Mongolia	Selenge Erdene-Ochir	19	Ulaanbaatar	Asia-Pacific
Montenegro	Ivana Knežević	17	Bar	Southern Europe
Namibia	Anna Nashandi	22	Windhoek	Africa
Netherlands	Sheryl Baas	22	Rotterdam	Northern Europe
Nigeria	Abiola Bashorun	18	Lagos	Africa
Northern Ireland	Catherine Jean Milligan	19	Newtownards	Northern Europe
Norway	Tonje Elise Skjærvik	18	Stokkøya	Northern Europe
Panama	Giselle Bissot	23	Panama City	Americas
Peru	Silvia Cornejo	19	Trujillo	Americas
Philippines	Anna Maris Igpit	19	Panglao	Asia-Pacific
Poland	Marzena Cieślik	25	Wolin	Northern Europe
Portugal	Sara Almeida	19	Porto	Southern Europe
Puerto Rico	Thebyam Carrión	23	Mayagüez	Caribbean
Romania	Ioana Boitor	17	Bucharest	Southern Europe
Russia	Alexandra Mazur	19	Moscow	Northern Europe
Saint Lucia	Tamalisa Baptiste	20	Marchand	Caribbean
Scotland	Nicola McLean	22	Hamilton	Northern Europe
Serbia	Vedrana Grbović	18	Belgrade	Southern Europe
Singapore	Colleen Pereira	24	Singapore	Asia-Pacific
Slovakia	Magdalena Šebestová	23	Bílkove Humence	Southern Europe
Slovenia	Iris Mulej	25	Ljubljana	Southern Europe
South Africa	Nokuthula Sithole	22	Gauteng	Africa
South Korea (Note: Competed as Korea in the pageant)	Sharon Park	21	Icheon	Asia-Pacific
Spain	Inmaculada Torres	24	Alicante	Southern Europe
Sri Lanka	Dannielle Kerkoven	18	Colombo	Asia-Pacific
Sweden	Cathrin Skoog	19	Krokom	Northern Europe
Tanzania	Wema Sepetu	18	Dar es Salaam	Africa
Thailand	Melisa Mahapol	23	Bangkok	Asia-Pacific
Trinidad and Tobago	Tineke De Freitas	23	Westmoorings	Caribbean
Turkey	Merve Büyüksaraç	18	Ankara	Southern Europe
Ukraine	Olga Shilovanova	19	Kharkiv	Northern Europe
United States	Brooke Angus	24	Essex	Americas
Uruguay	Marlene Politi	20	San Jacinto	Americas
Venezuela	Federica Guzmán	24	Caracas	Americas
Vietnam	Mai Phương Thúy	21	Hanoi	Asia-Pacific
Wales	Sarah Fleming	17	Brecon Beacons	Northern Europe
Zambia	Katanekwa Matundwelo	25	Lusaka	Africa
Zimbabwe	Lorraine Maphala	21	Bulawayo	Africa

== Notes ==
=== Withdrawals ===
- Belize – Miss World Belize 2006, Felicita (Leesha) Arzu was crowned on 29 July, but the organizers decided that she would take part at Miss World 2007.
- Egypt – Miss Egypt 2006, Fawzia Mohamed had visa problems.

No Shows:

- Albania – No contest
- Antigua and Barbuda – Due to financial problems.
- British Virgin Islands – Martha Ramirez
- Burkina Faso – Ramata Barry
- Chad – No contest
- Côte d'Ivoire – Alima Diomandé
- Malawi – Peth Msiska
- Nepal – No contest due to the Nepalese Civil War. It was postponed until 2007.
- New Zealand – No contest
- Nicaragua – Due to financial problems.
- Paraguay – Due to financial problems.
- Republic of the Congo – Eboundt Fatouma Blanda
- Swaziland – No contest
- Switzerland – Due to scheduling conflicts, the national pageant was held on 9 September making the 2006 winner ineligible to compete, plus no finalists of Miss Switzerland 2005 pageant were available to compete. After that Switzerland did not send a contestant to the Miss World contest until 2013.
- Uganda – No contest
- United States Virgin Islands – No contest

=== Replacements ===
- Uruguay – Miss Uruguay Mundo 2006, Soledad Gagliardo was replaced by her first runner up, Marlene Politi for unknown reasons.
