= Dafne Molina =

Mexican designer, model and pageant titleholder

- Born: Dafne Molina Lona; February 24, 1982 (age 44); Mexico City, Mexico
- Height: 1.78 m (5 ft 10 in)
- Beauty pageant titleholder
- Title: Nuestra Belleza Mundo México 2004; Miss World Americas
- Hair color: Black
- Eye color: Hazel
- Major competitions: Nuestra Belleza Distrito Federal 2004 (Winner); Nuestra Belleza México 2004 (Nuestra Belleza Mundo México); Miss World 2005 (1st runner-up) (Miss World Americas)

Dafne Molina Lona (born February 24, 1982, in Mexico City, Distrito Federal) is a Mexican designer, model and beauty pageant titleholder who represented her country in the Miss World 2005 pageant, held in Sanya, China on December 10, 2005.

== Biography ==
Prior to becoming a beauty queen, Dafne Molina participated in Elite Model Look Mexico 2002 and later received her diploma in interior design. On September 10, 2004, she competed in the national beauty pageant Nuestra Belleza México, held in San Luis Potosí. Placing second to Laura Elizondo of Tamaulipas, who became Miss Mexico Universe, Molina obtained the title of Miss Mexico World, which gave her the right to represent Mexico in the Miss World pageant.

== See also ==
- Laura Elizondo
- Nuestra Belleza México 2004
- Miss World 2005

Awards and achievements
Preceded by (Dominican Republic) Claudia Cruz	1st Runner-up Miss World; 2005	Succeeded by (Romania) Ioana Boitor
Preceded by (United States) Nancy Randall	Miss World Americas; 2005	Succeeded by (Brazil) Jane Borges
Preceded by Yessica Ramírez	Nuestra Belleza Mundo México; 2004	Succeeded by Karla Jiménez
