= Omowunmi Akinnifesi =

Nigerian businesswoman

- Born: Omowunmi Akinnifesi; December 4, 1987 (age 38); Lagos, Nigeria
- Occupation: Businesswoman
- Height: 5 ft 8 in (1.73 m)
- Beauty pageant titleholder
- Title: Most Beautiful Girl in Nigeria 2005
- Hair colour: Black
- Eye colour: Brown
- Major competitions: Most Beautiful Girl in Nigeria 2005; Miss World 2005

Omowunmi Akinnifesi (born December 4, 1987) is a Nigerian businesswoman, environmental ambassador and beauty pageant titleholder. She was the winner of the Most Beautiful Girl in Nigeria 2005.

== Early life and education ==
The daughter of a former Central Bank of Nigeria director, Akinnifesi was born on the 4th of December, 1986 in Lagos but spent her early years in Sierra Leone before returning to her native Nigeria with her family. She attended Queen's College, Yaba, where she won several prizes for her art work. In 2008, Akinnifesi graduated from the University of Lagos with a degree in Geography and Regional Planning, In 2012, Akinnifesi obtained a master's degree in Environmental Monitoring, Modelling, and Management from King's College London.

== Career ==
In 2005, eighteen-year-old Akinnifesi was crowned Most Beautiful Girl in Nigeria, making her eligible to represent her country at the Miss World 2005 in China that same year, where she engaged in tree planting for the Chinese government. Akinnifesi emerged first runner-up on the Nigerian version of Strictly Come Dancing, Celebrity Takes 2 before she launched her own public relations and usher-hiring business Elle Poise. Aknnifesi has been hailed as a style icon in recent years, and was honoured at the 2011 Allure Style Awards. It was during this time that she revealed that she had experienced a six-year campaign of terror from a stalker.

In 2016, Akinnifesi launched her clothing line labelled, "Omowunmi".

Preceded by Anita Uwagbale	Most Beautiful Girl in Nigeria; 2005	Succeeded by Abiola Bashorun
