= Irini Karra =

Greek model (born 1986)

Eirini Karra
- Born: Eirini Karra; 13 December 1986 (age 38); Karditsa, Greece
- Height: 1.76 m (5 ft 9 in)

Eirini Karra (Greek: Ειρήνη Καρρά) is a Greek model and beauty pageant titleholder who took part at the Miss Star Hellas pageant in April 2006, and represented her country in the Miss World 2006 pageant, held in Warsaw, Poland. She is currently represented by Ace Models and is also well known for her large participation in the IrchaLovesToby campaign.

In April 2006 Eirini won the title Miss Hellas (Μις Ελλάς). She represented Greece at the Miss World 2006 pageant on September 30, 2006, in Warsaw, Poland.
