= Martinique Queens =

Beauty pageant

- Formation: 2005; 21 years ago
- Type: Beauty pageant
- Headquarters: Fort-de-France
- Location: Martinique
- Members: Miss World
- Official language: French
- Website: Official site

Martinique Queens is a national beauty pageant responsible for selecting Martinique's representatives to the International pageants. This pageant is not related to Miss Martinique where the winner traditionally competes at Miss France contest.

== Titleholders ==
Color key

- Declared as Winner
- Ended as runner-up
- Ended as one of the finalists or semifinalists

Year	Martinique Queen World	Martinique Queen Earth	Martinique Queen International	Martinique Queen Intercontinental
2004	N/A	Murielle Celimene (1st Runner-up)	N/A	
2005	Moana Robinel	Gaëlle ‘Elle’ Narayanan	N/A	Linda Daquin; Best Charity Ambassador
2006	Stephanie Colosse	Mégane Cindy Martinon	Murielle Desgrelle	Sarasvati Lutbert (2nd Runner-up)
2007	Vanessa Beauchaints	Élodie Delor (Top 16)	N/A	N/A
2008	Élodie Delor	Frédérique Violaine Grainville	N/A	Julie Cadot
2009	Ingrid Littré (Top 16); Miss World Top Model (2nd Runner-up)	Pascale Laurie Nelide (Top 8)	Nathaly Isabelle Peters	Andy Govindin (Top 15); Miss Photogenic
2010	Tully Fremcourt	Christine Elisabeth Garcon	Yasmina Marie Varsovie	Yaelle Souchette
2011	Axelle Perrier; Miss World Beach Beauty (1st Runner-up)	Coralie Leplus	N/A	Kathelyn Desire; Miss Photogenic
2012	Andy Govindin	N/A	N/A	N/A
2013	Julie Lebrasseur	Rani Charles; Miss Bulusan Challenge	N/A	Juelie Lebrasseur
2014	Anaïs Delwaulle	N/A	N/A	N/A
2015	N/A	N/A	N/A	N/A
2016	N/A	N/A	N/A	N/A
2017	N/A	N/A	N/A	N/A
2018	Larissa Segarel (Top 12); Miss World Caribbean (1st Runner-up)	N/A	N/A	N/A
2023	Axelle René (Top 40); Miss World Top Model	N/A	Pauline Thimon	N/A
2025	Aurélie Joachim (3rd Runner-up); Miss World Caribbean	N/A	N/A	
2026	Laurence Fibleuil	N/A	N/A	N/A
