= Sara Lawrence =

Jamaican model

- Born: Kingston, Jamaica; November 23, 1984 (age 41)
- Education: Randolph-Macon Woman's College
- Spouse: Noel Lewis (m. 2018)
- Medical career
- Profession: Obstetrician; Gynecologist
- Institutions: Randolph-Macon Woman's College
- Sub-specialties: Gynecology; Obstetrics
- Height: 5 ft 9.5 in (1.77 m)
- Beauty pageant titleholder
- Title: Miss World 2006; Miss World Caribbean
- Hair colour: Black
- Eye colour: Black
- Major competitions: Miss Jamaica World (3rd Runner-up); Miss World Caribbean (Winner)

Sara Lawrence-Lewis (born 23 November 1984) is a Jamaican model and beauty pageant titleholder who was the representative for Jamaica in the Miss World 2006. In March 2007, she relinquished the Miss Jamaica World title upon announcing her pregnancy, becoming the first winner in the Jamaican contest's 23-year-history to do so.

Lawrence was born in Kingston, Jamaica. She graduated from Immaculate Conception High School in Kingston, Jamaica, as well the Randolph-Macon Woman's College in Lynchburg, Virginia, where she majored in biology with an emphasis on pre-medicine; according to her contestant biography, her career ambition is to become a doctor specializing in obstetrics and gynaecology.

After winning the Miss Jamaica World title in August 2006, Lawrence placed in the first six at the Miss World competition held in Warsaw, Poland, where she was also named Miss World Caribbean.

Upon relinquishing her crown in March 2007, Lawrence said in a statement that she had "taken a deeply personal decision to face up to my responsibilities as one who expects to become a mother later this year. I believe with all that is within me that it is my moral obligation to do what I believe to be ethically correct and follow what I believe in my heart to be right."

The pageant's entry rules dictate that contestants must not have given birth to a child prior to the competition, and the winner "must be prepared to be a positive role model for the youth of Jamaica." Mickey Haughton-James, a pageant official, said that "Lawrence's actions could potentially harm the tradition that is the Miss Jamaica World pageant and its past and future winners."

Lawrence, however, received overwhelming support from the Jamaican public for her decision to have her baby. She received the backing of the Miss World Organization and was allowed to retain both her crowns for the full duration of the reign.

Sara was married to Major Noel Lewis and they have 3 children.

Preceded by Ingrid Rivera	Miss World Caribbean; 2006	Succeeded by Valene Maharaj
