= Mohy Quandour =

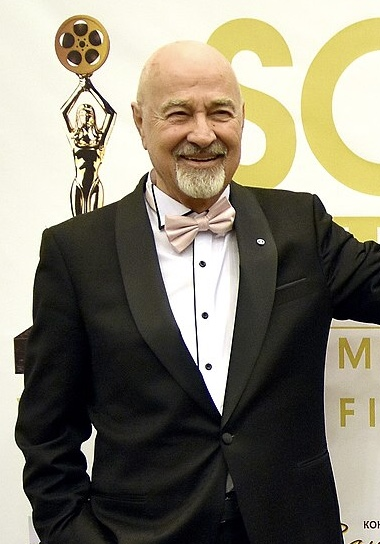
- Quandour in 2019
- Born: Mohydeen Izzat Quandour; 6 June 1938; Amman, Jordan
- Died: 27 November 2023; Windsor, England
- Other names: Mohydeen Quandour; M.I. Quandour
- Education: Earlham College; Claremont Graduate University
- Years active: 1960–2023

Mohydeen Izzat Quandour (6 March 1938 – 27 November 2023) was a Jordanian author, producer, and director of Circassian origin.

== Early life ==
Quandour was born in Amman, Jordan, the son of army general Izzat Quandour. He moved to the United States at age 13. He studied history at Earlham College in Indiana, and then pursued a Master of Arts and a PhD in economics and international relations at Claremont Graduate University in California.

== Career ==
Quandour began his career working as an assistant producer and later director and producer for the J. Walter Thompson advertising company in New York. He later worked in marketing at Bristol Myers International. His debut novel The Skyjack Affair was published in 1970 via the Williams Press, and his second novel Rupture was released in 1971. Quandour subsequently relocated to Hollywood to pursue screenwriting and producing, working on the CBS series Mannix and the NBC series Bonanza. In 1974 and 1975, Quandour returned to marketing and consulting in London, Moscow, and Tokyo.

Quandour returned to novel writing in the 1990s. He directed,, wrote, and produced the films Cherkess (2010), The Prisoner (2012), and A Facebook Romance (2012).

== Personal life ==
Quandour is survived by a large family, including his last wife, poet Luba Balagova, with whom he spent the last 30 years. He had two sons with her - Kazbek and Aleem. Quandour also had four other children from previous marriages. He lived in the Old Windsor, England with his family. He also spent time in Jordan, Russia and Istanbul, Turkey. Quandour died in England on 27 November 2023.

== Bibliography ==
- The Skyjack Affair (ISBN 1419649728, BookSurge Publishing 2006)
- Rupture (ISBN 1419649736, BookSurge Publishing 2006)
- Kavkas Trilogy (ISBN 1861066988, Minerva Press 1998)
- Muridism: A Study of the Caucasian Wars 1819 - 1859 (ISBN 1419649744, BookSurge Publishing 2006)
- Revolution (ISBN 1595940405, WingSpan Press 2006)
- The Balkan Story (ISBN 1595941479, WingSpan Press 2007)
- Dangerous Encounters
- Lost in Chechnya (ISBN 1595940715, WingSpan Press 2006)
- The Legend (ISBN 1595940863, WingSpan Press 2006)
- The Last Hunt: A Novel of the New Russia (ISBN 159594091X, WingSpan Press 2006)
- Desert Sunrise (ISBN 1595940804, WingSpan Press 2006)
- Children of the Diaspora (ISBN 1595942165, WingSpan Press 2007)
- Iraq: Desert Crossings (ISBN 1595942572, WingSpan Press 2008)
- Pandemic by Mohy Kandour and Luba Balagova Kandour | 14 Dec 2021 Paperback (https://www.amazon.co.uk/Pandemic-Mohy-Kandour/dp/1636830242/ref=sr_1_4?dib=eyJ2IjoiMSJ9.tgAvcMlFAOZLeLI4e5PVD5cSZcufVgmBV8QoXi-EH9Jxnn3_qZVbXwwI3pcxHwjt.fK9Vq1_ZRhjZtXvwBt0fgGslEmWd_f_Zgw08IRlmyyc&dib_tag=se&qid=1742485605&refinements=p_27%3AKandour&s=books&sr=1-4)
- The Humming Birds Paperback – 12 Dec. 2022

by Mohy Kandour (Author)://www.amazon.co.uk/Humming-Birds-Mohy-Kandour/dp/1636830390/ref=sr_1_3?dib=eyJ2IjoiMSJ9.tgAvcMlFAOZLeLI4e5PVD5cSZcufVgmBV8QoXi-EH9Jxnn3_qZVbXwwI3pcxHwjt.fK9Vq1_ZRhjZtXvwBt0fgGslEmWd_f_Zgw08IRlmyyc&dib_tag=se&qid=1742485605&refinements=p_27%3AKandour&s=books&sr=1-3

- Bridge to the Moon: Stories by M I Quandour (Author) Paperback – 19 May 2019 by M I Quandour https://www.amazon.co.uk/Bridge-Moon-M-I-Quandour/dp/1595946381

== Select filmography ==
| Year | Title | Director | Writer | Producer | Notes |
|---|---|---|---|---|---|
| 1974 | The Spectre of Edgar Allan Poe | Yes | Yes | Yes | |
| 1974 | When the Wind Blows | Yes | Yes | | |
| 2005 | Lost in the Mountains | | | Yes | |
| 2010 | Cherkess | Yes | Yes | Yes | |
| 2012 | The Prisoner | Yes | Yes | Yes | |
| 2012 | A Facebook Romance | Yes | Yes | Yes | |
| 2019 | Jaber | Yes | Yes | | |
