= Yulia Ivanova (model) =

Russian beauty queen and a model (born 1983)

- Born: Yulia Ivanova; 1983 (age 42–43); Novosibirsk, Russian SFSR, Soviet Union
- Occupation: Model

Yulia Ivanova (Russian: Юлия Иванова) (born 1983, Novosibirsk) is a Russian model and beauty pageant titleholder. She was crowned Krasa Rossii 2005 and later represented Russia at Miss World 2005. She made the top 15 by winning the Beach Beauty competition. Before competing in beauty pageants Yulia was a contestant in Ty - supermodel cycle 2 TV show & participated in Krasa Rossii 2004.

| Preceded by Tatyana Sidorchuk | Miss World Russia; 2005 | Succeeded by Aleksandra Mazur |
| Preceded by Nancy Randall | Miss World Beach Beauty; 2005 | Succeeded by Federica Guzmán |
