= Sarah Lawrence (disambiguation) =

Sarah Lawrence is a Liberal Arts college in Westchester County, New York.

Sarah Lawrence may also refer to:

- Sarah Lawrence (educator) (1780–1859), English educator, writer and literary editor
- Sarah Lawrence (Latter Day Saint) (1826–1872), wife of Joseph Smith
- Sarah Lawrence (actress) (born 1986), Australian actress and TV personality
- Sarah Lawrence, British actress best known for playing Darlene Taylor in soap opera Hollyoaks

== See also ==
- Sara Lawrence (disambiguation)
- Sara Lawrence-Lightfoot (born 1944), American sociologist
