= Ana María Ortiz =

Bolivian beauty queen and model

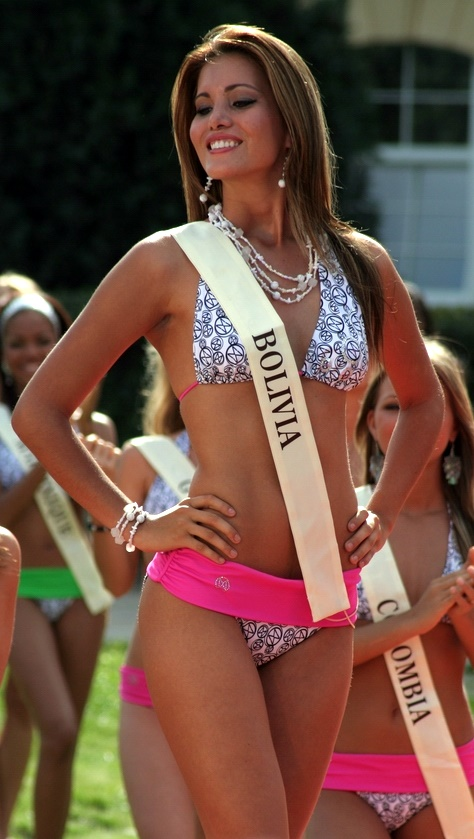
- Born: Ana María Ortiz; 1989 (age 35–36); Beni, Bolivia
- Modeling information
- Height: 1.80 m (5 ft 11 in)
- Hair color: Brown
- Eye color: Brown

Ana María Ortiz (born 1989) is a Bolivian model and beauty pageant titleholder who was Bolivia's delegate to Miss World 2006.

She was born in Beni in northern Bolivia. She studied political science.

She entered the 2006 contest with Desiree Durán Morales.
