= Catherine Jean Milligan =

Northern Irish model (born 1986)

Catherine Jean Milligan (born 11 September 1986, Newtownards, County Down, Northern Ireland) is a Northern Irish model and beauty pageant titleholder who was the 2006 Miss Northern Ireland, and represented her country at Miss World 2006 finals in Poland. She won Miss World Talent 2006, placing her in the semi-finals of the competition along with the other Top 16 contestants. She is the first Northern Ireland representative to have won a fast track event at Miss World.

== Education ==
She attended Regent House Grammar School where she was Head Girl 2004/2005.

Preceded by Lucy Evangelista (2005)	Miss Northern Ireland; 2006	Succeeded by Melissa Patton (2007)
