= Selenge Erdene-Ochir =

Mongolian model and beauty queen

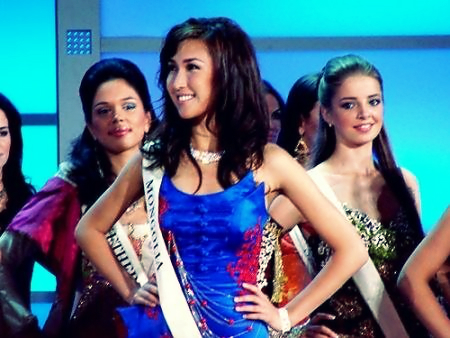
Erdene-Ochir in 2006

Selenge Erdene-Ochir (born 30 December 1987, Erdenet, Mongolia) is a Mongolian fashion model and beauty pageant titleholder who was the winner of Miss World Mongolia 2006 and represented her country at Miss World 2006. She was the first Mongolian to compete and work for FashionTV. She won the "First Runner Up" and "Ambassador of Mongolia" award at the "Miss Fashion TV" models contest.

Erdene-Ochir moved to the United Kingdom in October 2020 from Antalya, Turkey.

== Early life ==
Named after the Selenge River, she was born December 30, 1987, in Erdenet, Mongolia. She was the youngest daughter of Erdene-Ochir (father) and Khadbaatar (Mother). Her sister Baigal, named after Lake Baikal, was born in Irkutsk. Selenge's family moved to Ulaanbaatar when she was 7, where she lived in the "Zhukovsky" area named after Georgy Zhukov. In 2005, she graduated from Russian high school "Iskra". She graduated from the university of "Tsakhim" Technology school in Program Engineering in 2010. She moved to Los Angeles, California with her boyfriend in 2011, and studied forensics. In 2013 she studied fashion design at the local university "Urlakh Erdem" in Ulaanbaatar.

Her modelling career began at age 9 when she joined a local modeling course. Her teacher, former model "Baigali", who's a namesake to Baigal, was introduced to her by her elder sister, who was also one of his students as well. She entered her first modeling contest at age 12 where she was nominated as "Potential" at local model contest called "Unsgeljin" (Cinderella) in 2002.

== Career ==
Selenge Erdene-Ochir won beauty pageants and became Miss Mongolia- World in Ulaanbaatar, Mongolia 2006. She placed 4th at Miss Talent hosted in Wrocław, Poland 2006. She came 4th at the Miss Sports Nominee.

Selenge worked as a fashion presenter. She won First Runner up as the Ambassador of Mongolia at the Semi Final held in Ho Chi Minh City. She also appeared at the Grand Final in Bangkok, Thailand.

She was the first model to represent her country at the "Miss Fashion TV" model contest. She worked for the company as a model and became a Project Coordinator. She also competed at the "Miss Bikini International" - models contest held in Shanghai, China. She was nominated for the "Miss Aura" award in 2007.

She appeared on magazine covers for "Gyalbaa", "Uptown", "TV-INFO", "Reader's Digest", "Yalguun", "Umbrella" in Mongolia. She played a small role in a comedic movie called Pomogite Nam-2 representing her title as "Beauty Queen".

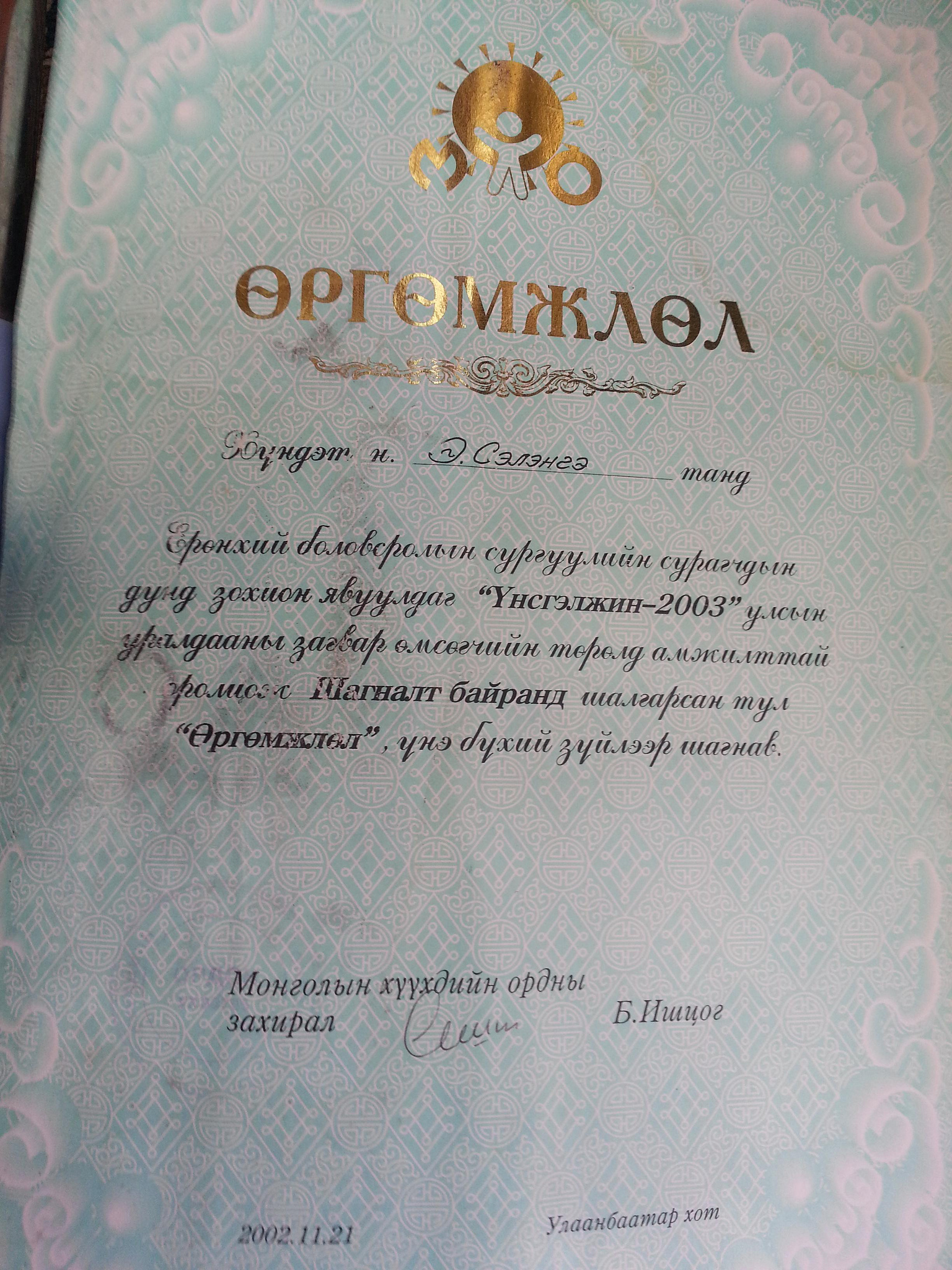
(CINDERELLA)TUSGAI BAIR

She worked in overseas at Fashion TV, modeling for Diva Models, Singapore, Elite Models, Milan, Italy, IMG Models, in New York, and Red Models, Bangkok.
