= Elizabeth Loaiza Junca =

Colombian aviator and model

Elizabeth Loaiza
- Born: Elizabeth Loaiza Junca; January 7, 1989 (age 37); Cali, Cauca Valley, Colombia
- Occupation: Model
- Modeling information
- Height: 174 cm (5 ft 9 in)
- Hair color: Brown
- Eye color: Green
- Website: elizabethloaiza.co

Elizabeth Loaiza Junca (born 1989) is a Colombian model, pilot and beauty pageant titleholder.

== Career ==
Elizabeth began modelling at the age of 4. She won the Miss Mundo Colombia (Miss World Colombia) beauty pageant in 2006 and represented her country at Miss World 2006.

She has appeared on the cover of countless magazines such as SoHo, which has been ported four times, Don Juan, Novias, Tv and Novelas, Vea, among others. In 2015, she was an image of Colombian Clinic of Obesity and Metabolism, and protagonist in a music video of John Paul Ospina called Doin 'it.
