= Stéphanie Colosse =

Stephanie Colosse
- Born: Stephanie Florence Colosse; 1987 (age 38–39); Fort de France, Martinique
- Website: Miss World Contestant Profile

Stephanie Florence Colosse (born 1987) is a Martinican model and beauty pageant titleholder.

Colosse won the title of Martinique Queens 2005 and also winning Best Smile and Photogenic Award. She is the second contestant to represented Martinique at Miss World 2006. She is 171 cm tall.

She is currently studying towards her diploma in biological sciences so that she can become a member of her country's scientific police force and is aiming to become a nurse.

Colosse is participating in Miss World 2006 and was a finalist in the sports Fast Track event.
