= Nicola McLean (Scottish model) =

Scottish actress and model (born 1984)

- Born: 21 April 1984 (age 42); Hamilton, South Lanarkshire, Scotland
- Occupations: Model, choreographer, presenter
- Years active: 1999–present
- Spouse: Paul Montgomery (m. 2010)
- Modeling information
- Height: 6 ft 0 in (1.83 m)
- Hair color: Brown
- Eye color: Green

Nicola McLean (born 21 April 1984) is a Scottish actress, model, choreographer, media personality, TV host and beauty pageant titleholder. She was crowned Miss Scotland 2006 and represented her country at the Miss World 2006 pageant.

== Biography ==
McLean started her modeling career aged fifteen when a photographer shot a portfolio for her during a high school activity week, although she worked as a document controller for an oil company before becoming a full-time model.

She was the Face of Vital in 2002–2003 for The Daily Record newspaper which led to her signing with the Look Agency (now Colours Agency) in Glasgow. She began working for fashion companies in Scotland, such as Slaters, House of Fraser, Quiz, Internacionale, Lyle & Scott, USC, and the Sunday Herald, as well as internationally-known designers like Amanda Wakely, Ralph Lauren and Armani. In an Ultimo fashion show, she shared the catwalk with Rod Stewart's wife Penny Lancaster.

In 2003, during a Daily Record photoshoot in Milan with the new Face of Vital winner, she was signed up with the Beatrice modelling agency in Milan for a Vivienne Westwood catalogue shoot.

In 2004, she was signed by the Storm model agency to appear in the London Fashion Week for designer Ronit Zilkha. She shared the catwalk with Jodie Kidd and with Rod Stewart's ex-wife and model Rachel Hunter.

In 2005, she was part of the showcasing of the summer collection of Ben de Lisi at the chic boutique Jane Davidson in Edinburgh, whose store was voted one of the top 25 in the world by Style magazine, Harpers and Queen. She has also taken part in numerous charity fashion shows, including those for Breast Cancer Care, The Red Cross and Cash for Kids. In Greece, she was in advertisements as part of the Eurovision song contest.

In 2006, she was a finalist in the model of the year competition at the Scottish Fashion Awards; Kirsty Hume was the winner that year.

In 2006, she won the Miss Scotland title and represented Scotland at the Miss World show in Warsaw, Poland. She went on to win the Miss UK title after being placed in the top ten. Having been interviewed during Miss World by Radio Clyde 1, she went on to co-host the Clyde 1 radio show Bowie at Breakfast with George Bowie interviewing a host of celebrities and was part of the team that won a Sony Radio Award.

She abseiled down Glasgow's 100m science tower when she was a presenter for Clyde 1 and has a dream to be a Bond girl.

She was the face of Rox Jewellers media campaign 2008–2009 She has been in the news showing off her Bollywood look wearing a bindi. McLean said that "while growing up one of my best friends was an Indian girl and I used to wear hers and loved it. My bindi was just costume jewellery in look alike rubies and diamonds."

In 2009, she took part in the Fake Bake Clyde 1 charity fashion show, raising funds for (RAFT) for skin cancer held in the Crowne Plaza Hotel in Glasgow.

In 2009, she was a finalist in the model of the year competition at the Scottish Fashion Awards held in Stirling Castle.

With the STV weatherman, Seán Batty, she promoted the Energy Saving Trust's new campaign. George Square in Glasgow was decorated like a snow scene in winter to draw people's attention to heating their homes in winter.

In 2009, McLean choreographed Scotland's first Under 18s Fashion Event, 'How to Look Good Fully Clothed', hosted in the Mega Bar in Motherwell. The event was attended by 350 young people aged 12–18 years old.

In October 2010, McLean married Paul Montgomery at a quiet family ceremony at The Moorings Hotel in Motherwell.
