= Nadeeka Perera =

Sri Lankan fashion model (born 1983)

Nadeeka Samanmali Perera
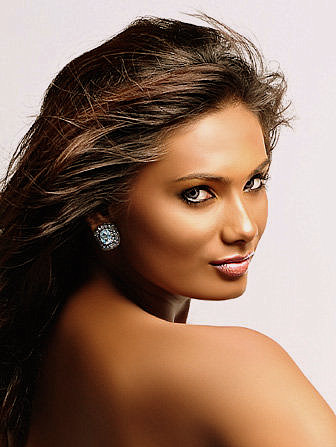
- Born: 22 October 1983 (age 42); Colombo, Sri Lanka
- Modeling information
- Height: 177 cm (5 ft 10 in)
- Hair color: Black
- Eye color: dark brown

Nadeeka Samanmali Perera (Sinhala:නදීකා සමන්මලී පෙරේරා, born 22 Oct 1983) is a Sri Lankan fashion model and beauty pageant titleholder. She competed at Miss World 2005 pageant and has been crowned as "The International Best Female Model-2007" at a ceremony held in Spain.

== Early life ==
Nadeeka was educated at Central College – Dehiwala and St. Joseph's Girls' School. She wanted to become a model ever since the age of 16. At 1.8 metres (5 ft 11 in), Nadeeka is the tallest female model in Sri Lanka.

== Career ==
She has successfully completed a professional course in modeling and presently follows a course in beauty culture. After completing her courses, she hopes to set up her own boutique selling her own line of designs. She enjoys social dancing, volleyball, sewing, designing and making costume jewellery, and watching TV programs on travel and tourism.

Her aim in life is to encourage all young women to believe in themselves and overcome all obstacles which prevent them from fulfilling their dreams.

Perera represented Sri Lanka at the pageant in Alicante, Spain in 2007 and for the first time a Sri Lankan woman won first place in this category apart from the four mini titles, Miss Photogenic, Miss Glamour, Best National Costume and Miss Catwalk.

Her mini title Best National Costume was a unique design as she dressed up as a traditional 'Gara Yaka'.

In 2012 she started her own modeling school with 17 students. Those students were graduated on 21 October 2012.
