= Lucy Evangelista =

British model

- Born: 17 January 1986 (age 40); Ballymena, Northern Ireland, United Kingdom
- Beauty pageant titleholder
- Title: Miss Northern Ireland (2005)
- Major competitions: Miss Northern Ireland 2005; Miss World 2005

Lucy Avril Evangelista (born 17 January 1986 in Ballymena, Northern Ireland) is a Northern Irish model and beauty pageant titleholder who won the 2005 Miss Northern Ireland and represented the nation at Miss World 2005.

== Early life and career ==
Evangelista was educated at Ballymena Academy and has Italian ancestry on her father's side. She won Miss Northern Ireland 2005 and was placed in the top fifteen at the 2005 Miss World contest. This was the first time Northern Ireland placed at the finals of Miss World. As the highest placed of the four UK contestants, Evangelista won the Miss United Kingdom title in 2015.

== Personal life ==
She is currently married to former Ulster and Irish rugby player, Matt McCullough.

Preceded by Kirsty Stewart (2004)	Miss Northern Ireland; 2005	Succeeded by Catherine Jean Milligan (2006)
