= Marzena Cieślik =

Polish model

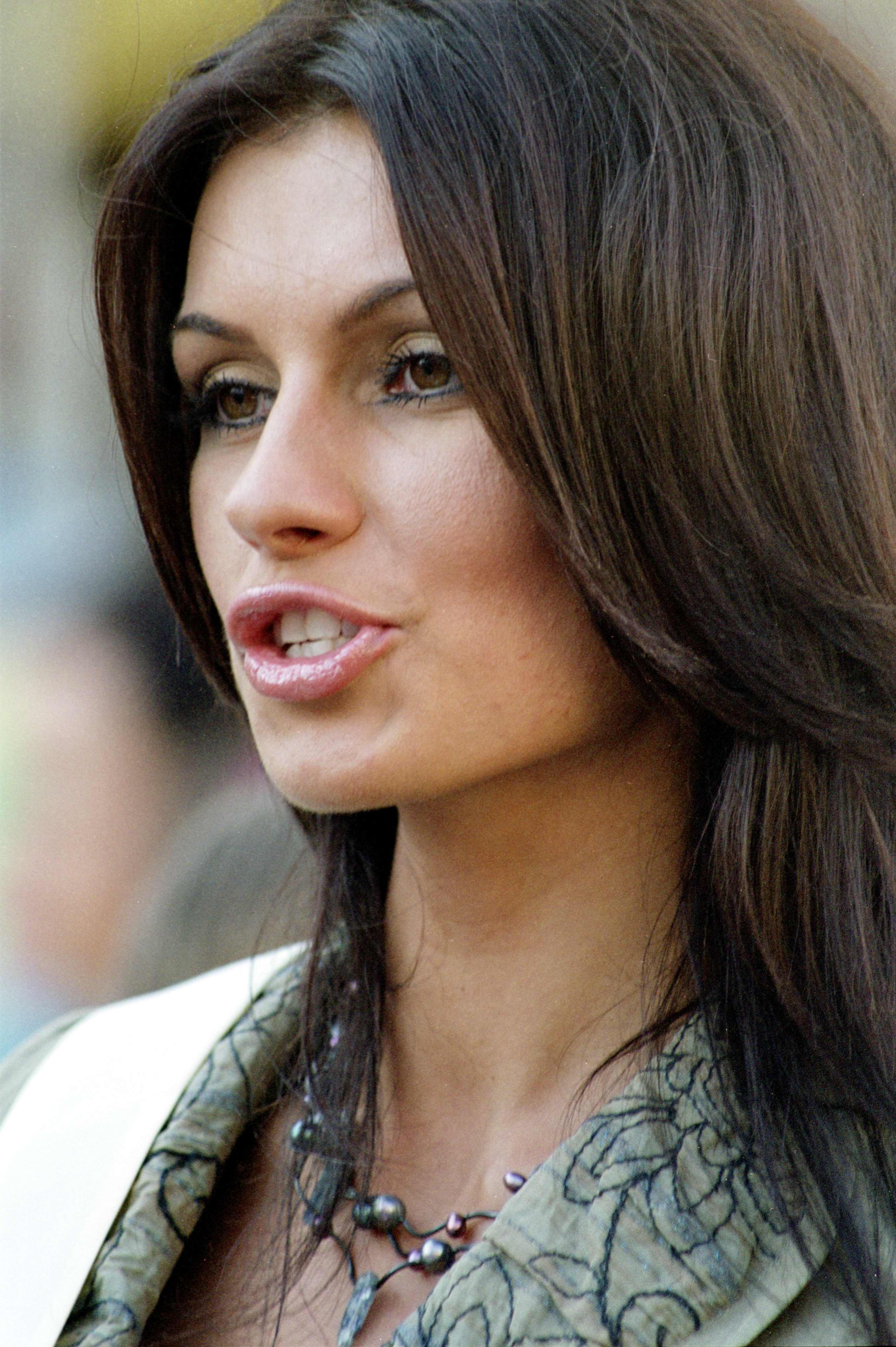
- Cieślik at a public appearance in Wrocław, September 2006
- Born: Marzena Cieślik; 21 August 1981 (age 45); Świnoujście, Polska
- Height: 176 cm (5 ft 9 in)
- Beauty pageant titleholder
- Title: Miss Polonia 2006
- Hair color: Brunette
- Eye color: Brown

Marzena Cieślik (born 21 August 1981) is a Polish model and beauty pageant titleholder l. Marzena Cieślik won the title of Miss Earth Zachodniopomorska 2006 and later that year was crowned Miss Polonia 2006. She was Poland's representative at Miss World 2006.

She featured in a photoshoot and on the cover of the Polish edition of Playboy in January 2009.

Preceded by Malwina Ratajczak	Miss Polonia; 2006	Succeeded by Barbara Tatara
