= Los Zafiros (trio) =

Spanish folk trio

The folk trio Los Zafiros were a band in the late 1960s and early 1970s who played traditional South American style music, although they actually originated in Spain. Their most notable performances were on British television variety shows of the period. They made several appearances on The Morecambe and Wise Show (1968–1971) and with Benny Hill. Their membership consisted of Alberto Martin (lead vocals, guitar), Jose Paris (lead vocal, guitar), Ricardo Ogando (vocals, guitar) and Pepe Pazos (vocals, requinto guitar).

In 1970, they released the LP "The Romantic World of Los Zafiros" released by RCA International.

== Known performances ==
- The Morecambe and Wise Show, series 1 episode from 1968.
- The Morecambe and Wise Christmas Show, 1971
- The Benny Hill Show (episodes in 1970 and 1973)
- In 1978 they appeared in Summer Season at the now demolished Knightstone Theatre Weston-Super-Mare with The Patton Brothers and Fred Van Buren
