= Abiola Bashorun =

Nigerian beauty pageant contestant

Abiola Bashorun is a Nigerian model and beauty pageant titleholder who won the Most Beautiful Girl in Nigeria 2006.

In 2006, eighteen-year-old Bashorun was the surprise winner of the annual pageant. As the reigning queen, Baroshun's platform was Sickle Cell Awareness. She was inspired after losing a friend to the disease; she spent most of her reign organising workshops and seminars to educate Nigerians on the disease. She also represented Nigeria at Miss World 2006.

In 2008, Bashorun appeared in a commercial for Motorola. She later went on to study Law in the United Kingdom and later moved back to Nigeria after graduating.
