= Neil Krisralam =

Thai television presenter and media personality

Neil Krisralam (born 28 March 1992) is a Thai television presenter and media personality.

== Early life ==
Krisralam was born in Thailand, and raised in Sydney, Australia. Krisralam graduated with a bachelor's degree in Media (Communications and Journalism), minoring in film studies and receiving top honours, from the University of New South Wales as well as a master's degree in Luxury Brand Management from the International University of Monaco, at the age of only 23. He also spent the senior year of his undergraduate studies completing his degree at the University of Michigan, United States.

== Career ==
Krisralam began his career in public relations, working for the Formula One event, Amber Lounge.
