= Lamitta Frangieh =

Lebanese actress

- Born: 15 November 1980 (age 44); Zgharta, Lebanon
- Occupations: Model; 1st Runner at Miss Lebanon 2004; Actress; Broadcaster
- Height: 5 ft 8 in (1.73 m)
- Title: 1st runner-up at Miss Lebanon 2004; Miss World 2005 (Unplaced)
- Spouse: Freddy Makhraz (m. 2014)
- Children: 1

Lamitta Frangieh (Arabic: لاميتا فرنجية; born 15 November 1980) is a Lebanese actress, model and beauty pageant titleholder who placed 1st Runner-up at Miss Lebanon 2004 and represented her country at Miss World 2005 but was unplaced.

== Beauty pageants and modeling ==
She claimed first runner-up at the 2004 Miss Lebanon Competition held at the LBC studios in Adma, Lebanon. Despite receiving the highest scores from nine independent jury members, she was only rewarded the position of first runner-up. She received the highest score (9.882) in Swimwear. Frangieh was voted as the most likely contestant to win the Miss Lebanon 2004 pageant, with local media on her side. However, due to political and religious interferences, she finished as first runner-up then proceeded to Miss World 2005 pageant, where she placed in the Top 12.

== Acting ==
In her acting career, she has filmed various movies and series, her start was with Lebanese series called 3asser el harim. In 2009, she moved to Egypt, where she was acting in various movies, Had Same' Haga with Ramez Galal, Mohtaram Ella Rob' with Mohammad Ragab, 365 days of happiness with Ahmad Ezz, Ana badi3 ya Wadi3, Omar w Salma 3 with Tamer Hosny.

== Personal life ==
In 2014, Lamita Franjieh married Lebanese businessman Freddy Makhraz in a private ceremony in Paris. They spent their honeymoon in Monaco and Thailand. She gave birth to their child, a son called Justin (b. 2016) at an American hospital in Carmel-by-the-Sea, California.
