= Lorraine Maphala-Phiri =

Zimbabwean beauty queen and entrepreneur

Lorraine Tsoanelo Maphala-Phiri (born 1984) is a Zimbabwean entrepreneur and beauty pageant titleholder who was crowned Miss World Zimbabwe 2005, becoming an instant celebrity in a country where pageant winners become household names. She later started a hair extension and beauty business.

== Biography ==
Maphala grew up in humble beginnings in Bulawayo's Nketa 6 neighborhood. Maphala first entered a beauty contest as a teenager in 2002, participating in Miss Bulawayo. Later that year, she won her first pageant, Miss Summer Strides. In 2005, she was crowned Miss Zimbabwe. After her reign as Miss Zimbabwe, she was crowned Miss Tourism Zimbabwe. Beauty pageants are incredibly popular in Zimbabwe. Maphala's pageant wins came at the height of pageantry in Zimbabwe, where winners would go on to become household names and recognizable celebrities. After becoming Miss Zimbabwe, Maphala became known across the country, as media would take a considerable interest in her private life.

=== Entrepreneurship ===
After winning her first pageant title, Maphala started a fashion business, but it quickly failed as she claimed she did not have enough experience in business. The experience did not discourage her, instead she drew on her poor upbringing to drive her to try again. In 2007, Maphala started her hair extensions business, Real Hair by Lorraine. Two years later, the business had failed due to a lack of investment. Maphala took a job at a finance company, quickly developing skills that she could use to restart her business. After saving starting capital and selling her car, Maphala relaunched Real Hair by Lorraine. This time, the business quickly grew. In 2016, Maphala opened Real Beauty by Lorraine, a hair studio focused on natural hair care products.

=== Personal life ===
In 2011, Maphala privately married Bulawayo businessman Sonny Phiri. The pair would have a public wedding in 2013. The pair met in 2008, and it was his finance company that gave Maphala the job that she credited with cultivating her business skills. In 2020, the couple welcomed their third child.

During the COVID-19 lockdowns in Zimbabwe, Maphala-Phiri and her husband hosted an online talk show discussing marriage and faith that went viral in the country, due to Sonny Phiri's highly publicized infidelity.

In 2023, the Bulawayo Model Awards, in honor of Maphala, renamed their Pageant Model of the Year award after her.
