= Angela Chow =

Taiwanese-Canadian actress and television host

- Born: August 5, 1972 (age 53)
- Occupations: VJ; TV host

Angela Chow (周瑛琦 Zhou Yingqi; 5 August 1972) is a Taiwanese-Canadian actress and TV host best known for hosting Miss World 2003 until Miss World 2011 and back again in Miss World 2015 to Miss World 2018.

Her family moved to Canada when she was seven. She is fluent in English and Mandarin. She was a former VJ for MTV Asia and Channel V music channels.

Currently, Chow is a bilingual TV host at the global Chinese network of Phoenix Satellite Television in Hong Kong.
