= Miss World =

International beauty pageant

- Top: traditional Miss World logo Bottom: current emblem of the Miss World Organization
- Type: International women's beauty pageant
- Headquarters: London, United Kingdom
- First edition: 1951
- Most recent edition: 2026
- Current titleholder: Joheirry Mola; Dominican Republic
- Founder: Eric Morley
- President: Julia Morley
- Language: English
- Website: www.missworld.com

Miss World is the oldest existing international beauty pageant. It was created in the United Kingdom by Eric Morley in 1951. Since his death in 2000, Morley's widow, Julia Morley, has chaired the pageant. Along with Miss Universe, Miss International, and Miss Earth, it is one of the Big Four beauty pageants.

The current Miss World is Joheirry Mola of the Dominican Republic, who was crowned on 5 September 2026 in Nha Trang, Vietnam. She was crowned by the previous winner, Suchata Chuangsri of Thailand.

== History ==
=== 20th century ===
In 1951, Eric Morley organised a bikini contest as part of the Festival of Britain celebrations that he called the Festival Bikini Contest. The event was popular with the press, which dubbed it "Miss World". The swimsuit competition was intended as a promotion for the bikini, which had only recently been introduced to the market and was still widely regarded as immodest. When the 1951 Miss World pageant winner, Kerstin "Kiki" Hakansson from Sweden, was crowned in a bikini, it added to the controversy.

The pageant was originally planned as a Pageant for the Festival of Britain, but Morley decided to make the Miss World pageant annual. He registered the "Miss World" name as a trademark, and all future pageants were held under that name. But because of the controversy arising from Håkansson's crowning in a bikini, countries with religious traditions threatened not to send delegates to future events, and the bikini was condemned by the Pope. Objection to the bikini led to its replacement in all future pageants with more modest swimwear, and from 1976, swimsuits were replaced by evening gowns for the crowning. Håkansson remains the only Miss World crowned in a bikini. In Miss World 2013, all participants wore a one-piece swimsuit plus a traditional sarong below the waist as a compromise with local culture.

Morley announced the Miss World winners in the order No. 3, No. 2 and No. 1. This was intended to keep the tension up, and avoid the anticlimax if Nos. 2 and 3 are announced after the winner.

In 1959, the BBC began to broadcast the pageant. Its popularity grew with the advent of television. During the 1960s and 1970s, Miss World was among the most watched programs of the year on British television. In 1970, the contest in London was disrupted by women's liberation protesters armed with flour bombs, stink bombs, and water pistols loaded with ink. The 1970 contest was also controversial when South Africa sent two contestants (one black and one white). Henceforth, South Africa was banned from the contest until apartheid was abolished. More than 18 million people watched the pageant at its peak during the late 1970s and early 1980s.

In the 1980s, the pageant repositioned itself with the slogan "Beauty With a Purpose", with added tests of intelligence and personality. In 1984, BBC1 controller Michael Grade announced that the corporation would cease to broadcast beauty pageants the next January, after it had shown Miss Great Britain, saying, "I believe these contests no longer merit national air time." He added, "They are an anachronism in this day and age of equality and verging on the offensive." Thames Television broadcast Miss World between 1980 and 1988, when ITV dropped it.

During the early 1990s, mainstream television broadcasts of the event disappeared, due to its decline in popularity, after it became "increasingly unfashionable" in the late 1980s. The pageant returned on satellite channel Sky One in 1997, before moving to Channel 5 for three years (1998–2000).

Eric Morley died in 2000, and his wife, Julia, succeeded him as chair of the Miss World organisation.

=== 21st century ===
The first black African Miss World winner, Agbani Darego of Nigeria, was crowned in 2001. As part of its marketing strategy, Miss World came up with a "Vote For Me" television special during that edition, featuring the delegates behind the scenes and on the beach, and allowing viewers to phone in or vote online for their favourites. It also sells broadcasters its talent, beach beauty and sports events as television specials. ITV broadcast the 2001 pageant from South Africa on digital channel ITV2, with the special airing a week earlier on the main ITV channel.

In 2002, the pageant was slated to host its final in Abuja, Nigeria. This choice was controversial, as a northern Nigerian woman, Amina Lawal, was awaiting death by stoning for adultery under Sharia law there, but Miss World used the publicity surrounding its presence to bring greater global awareness and action to Lawal's plight. No British channel agreed to broadcast the event, and there were objections to the contest.

Former Miss World Aishwarya Rai attended the Miss World 2014 ceremony with her husband Abhishek Bachchan, daughter Aaradhya and mother Brinda Rai. The pageant has been broadcast on local TV channel London Live since 2014.

== Miss World Organization ==
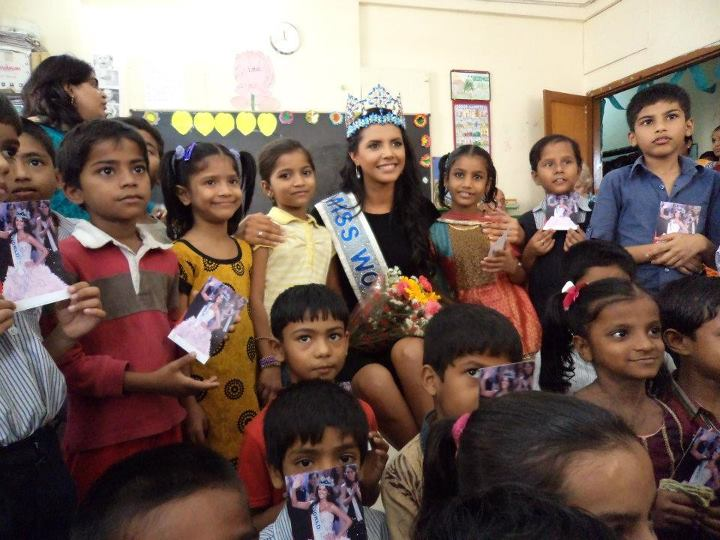
Ivian Sarcos, Miss World 2011 at a school in Mumbai, India

The Miss World Organization owns and manages the annual Miss World Finals, a competition that has grown into one of the world's biggest. Since its launch in 1951, the Miss World organisation has raised more than £1 billion for children's charities that help disabled and underprivileged children. Miss World is franchised in more than 100 countries.

=== 1970s–1990s ===
The Miss World pageant has been the target of many controversies since its inception.

- In 1970, feminist protesters threw flour bombs during the live event at London's Royal Albert Hall, momentarily alarming the host, Bob Hope.
- The 1973 winner, Marjorie Wallace, was stripped of her title on 8 March 1974 because she had failed to fulfill the basic requirements of the job. Miss World's organizers did not elect someone to serve in her place.
- In 1976, several countries boycotted the pageant because it included both a white and a black contestant from South Africa.
- The 1980 winner, Gabriella Brum of Germany, resigned one day after winning. A few days later it emerged that she had been forced to resign after it was discovered that she had posed naked for a magazine.

=== Nigeria 2002 ===
In the year leading up the finals in Nigeria, several European title holders lobbied their governments and the EU parliament to support Amina Lawal's cause. A number of contestants followed the lead of Kathrine Sørland of Norway in boycotting the contest (despite the controversy, Sørland became a semi-finalist in both the Miss World and Miss Universe contests), while others, such as Costa Rica, were instructed by their national governments and parliaments not to attend. Among the other boycotting nations were Denmark, Spain, Switzerland, Panama, Belgium and Kenya. Lawal asked that contestants not suspend their participation in the contest, saying that it was for the good of her country and that they could, as the representative of Sweden had earlier remarked, make a much stronger case for her on the ground in Nigeria.

Despite the increasing profile the boycott was garnering in the press, the contest proceeded in Nigeria after being rescheduled to avoid taking place during Ramadan, with many prominent nations sending delegates. Osmel Sousa of Venezuela, one of the world's most influential national directors, said, "there is no question about it [the participation of Miss Venezuela in the contest]." But the trouble did not end there. A ThisDay (Lagos, Nigeria) newspaper editorial suggesting that Muhammad would probably have chosen one of his wives from among the contestants had he been alive to see it resulted in inter-religious riots that started on 22 November in which over 200 people were killed in the city of Kaduna and many houses of worship were burned by religious zealots. Because of these riots, the 2002 pageant was moved to London, following widely circulated reports that Canada's and Korea's representatives had withdrawn from the contest and returned to their respective countries out of safety concerns. A fatwa urging the beheading of the woman who wrote the offending words, Isioma Daniel, was issued in Nigeria, but was declared null and void by the relevant Saudi Arabian authorities. Upon the pageant's return to Britain, many of the boycotting contestants chose to attend, including Miss Norway, Kathrine Sørland, who was ironically tipped in the last few days as the favourite for the crown she had previously boycotted.

The eventual winner of the pageant was Azra Akın of Turkey.

=== Indonesia 2013 ===
In Miss World 2013, protests by Islamic groups began a few weeks before the contest began, resulting in the pageant's finale and all pre-pageant activities being isolated to Hindu-majority Bali.

=== China 2015 ===
Anastasia Lin, Miss World Canada, was not given a visa to travel in China and hence missed the official deadline of 20 November 2015 for entry to the 2015 pageant, and was declared persona non grata by the Chinese Embassy in Ottawa for openly criticizing China's human rights violations. The Miss World Organization later allowed her to compete at Miss World 2016.

=== Thailand 2020 and cancellation ===
After the 2019 pageant, the organization chose Thailand as the host country of Miss World 2020, to be held in Phuket. But due to the spread of COVID-19, most national organizations and the Miss World organization agreed to cancel the 2020 pageant to assure the delegates' safety.

=== Puerto Rico 2021 and impact of the COVID-19 pandemic ===
The edition was originally scheduled for the end of 2020 but postponed indefinitely due to the global COVID-19 pandemic. On 8 March 2021, the date was set for 16 December 2021. The threat of the Omicron variant had already been detected in some parts of the world during the pre-pageant activities, as the disease started swept across the island. On 14 December, Miss World Indonesia Carla Yules tested positive for COVID-19. As a precaution, her roommate Miss World India Manasa Varanasi and five others were classified as suspected cases. Miss World Organization chair Julia Morley confirmed that the delegates were isolated and quarantined and would not be onstage for the final show if they did not produce a negative PCR test. On 15 December, the Puerto Rico Department of Health confirmed 17 positive cases for COVID-19 related to the Miss World pageant activities, including contestants and technical personnel. On 16 December, it was announced that Miss World Malaysia Lavanya Sivaji had tested positive for COVID-19. She was required to be isolated for 10 days and not permitted onstage during the finals. The finale, originally slated for 16 December, was postponed. During a 16 December Puerto Rico Department of Health press conference, epidemiologist Melissa Marzán confirmed 15 staff and 23 contestant positive cases associated with Miss World. She added that pageant organizers, not the island's authorities, decided to postpone. The rescheduled 70th Miss World pageant took place on 16 March 2022, at Puerto Rico's Coca-Cola Music Hall.

== Recent titleholders ==
Edition (Year)	Represented	Miss World	National Title	Location	Number of Entrants
73rd (2026)	Dominican Republic	Joheirry Mola	Miss Mundo Dominicana 2026	Nha Trang, Vietnam	111
72nd (2025)	Thailand	Suchata Chuangsri	Miss World Thailand 2025	Hyderabad, India	108
2024		No pageant held due to the delay of the 2023 pageant			
71st (2023)	Czech Republic	Krystyna Pyszková	Miss Czech Republic 2022	Mumbai, India	112
2022		No pageant held due to the delay of the 2021 pageant			
70th (2021)	Poland	Karolina Bielawska	Miss Polonia 2019	San Juan, Puerto Rico	97

== Fast-track events ==
Fast-track events of Miss World is a set of competition to decide the semi-finalist or the placement of Miss World. Fast-track events was one of deciding factor to choose semi-finalist beside Preliminary Interview by combining those rounds with using points system table. Prior to 2016 the winner of the fast-track events received huge amount of points but not securing semi-finalist spot, however since 2016 the points system table in fast-track were abolished. Since then the winners of the "fast-track" competitions automatically make it to the quarter- or semi-finals. The Miss World fast-track categories are: Beauty With a Purpose, Multimedia Challenge, Sports Challenge, Talent, and Top Model. Miss World Talent added in 2001, Miss World Sports added in 2003, Miss World Top Model added in 2004, Miss World Beauty With a Purpose added in 2005, and Miss World Multimedia added in 2012. There was a fast-track named Miss World Beach Beauty (2003–2015) but it is a discontinued event due to dissatisfaction and cons in many conservative countries, this event was replacing Miss World Best in Swimsuit.

=== Miss World Beauty With a Purpose ===
The Beauty with a Purpose is an event established in 1972 that is celebrated before the Miss World pageant. It awards the contestant with the most relevant and important charity project in her nation. The first winner of Beauty With a Purpose was Miss World Korea 2005 Oh Eun-young. Miss World 2017 Manushi Chhillar is the first and only Beauty With a Purpose recipient to win Miss World.

Year	Winner	Country	Placement at Miss World
2005	Oh Eun-young	South Korea	Top 6
2006	Lamisi Mbillah	Ghana	Top 17
2007	Valeska Saab	Ecuador	Top 16
2007	Kayi Cheung	Hong Kong	Top 16
2008	Gabrielle Walcott	Trinidad and Tobago	2nd Runner-up
2009	Pooja Chopra	India	Top 16
2010	Natasha Metto	Kenya	Top 25
2011	Astrid Yunadi	Indonesia	Top 15
2011	Stephanie Karikari	Ghana	
2012	Vanya Mishra	India	Top 7
2013	Ishani Shrestha	Nepal	Top 10
2014	Julia Gama	Brazil	Top 11
2014	Rafieya Husain	Guyana	Top 11
2014	Koyal Rana	India	Top 11
2014	Maria Rahajeng	Indonesia	Top 25
2014	Idah Nguma	Kenya	Top 11
2015	Maria Harfanti	Indonesia	2nd Runner-up
2016	Natasha Mannuela Halim	Indonesia	2nd Runner-up
2017	Manushi Chhillar	India	Miss World 2017
2017	Achintya Holte Nilsen	Indonesia	Top 10
2017	Laura Lehmann	Philippines	Top 40
2017	Adè van Heerden	South Africa	Top 10
2017	Đỗ Mỹ Linh	Vietnam	Top 40
2018	Shrinkhala Khatiwada	Nepal	Top 12
2019	Anushka Shrestha	Nepal	Top 12
2021	Shree Saini	United States	1st Runner-up
2023	Leticía Frota	Brazil	Top 8
2025	Monica Kezia Sembiring	Indonesia	Top 40
2026	Taanusiya Chetty	Malaysia	2nd Runner-up

=== Miss World Top Model ===
The Miss World Top Model is a modeling fast-track competition. It was first held in 2004, but not in 2005–2006. It has been held since 2007; since 2016 the winner of the competition automatically qualifies for the semi-finals.

Year	Winner	Represented	Placement at Miss World
2004	Yessica Ramírez	Mexico	Top 15
2007	Zhang Zilin	China	Miss World 2007
2008	Ksenia Sukhinova	Russia	Miss World 2008
2009	Perla Beltrán	Mexico	1st Runner-up
2010	Mariann Birkedal	Norway	Top 7
2011	Zhanna Zhumaliyeva	Kazakhstan	Top 15
2012	Atong Demach	South Sudan	Top 7
2013	Megan Young	Philippines	Miss World 2013
2014	Isidora Borovčanin	Bosnia and Herzegovina	
2015	Mireia Lalaguna	Spain	Miss World 2015
2016	Jing Kong	China	Top 11
2017	Ugochi Ihezue	Nigeria	Top 15
2018	Maëva Coucke	France	Top 12
2019	Nyekachi Douglas	Nigeria	Top 5
2021	Olivia Yacé	Cote d'Ivoire	2nd Runner-up
2023	Axelle René	Martinique	Top 40
2025	Nandini Gupta	India	Top 20
2025	Jasmine Gerhardt	Ireland	Top 20
2025	Selma Kamanya	Namibia	Top 8
2025	Aurélie Joachim	Martinique	3rd Runner-up
2026	Indira Ampiot	France	Top 12

=== Miss World Talent ===
Miss World Talent is a talent or fast-track competition in which contestants show their abilities in singing, dancing, poetry, etc. Introduced in Miss World 1978, the winner of the event automatically makes it into the semi-finals starting 2016. The award returned at Miss World 2001.

Year	Winner	Represented	Placement at Miss World
2001	Stephanie Chase	Barbados	
2002	Rebekah Revels	United States	Top 10
2003	Irina Onashvili	Georgia	Top 20
2004	Shermain Jeremy	Antigua and Barbuda	Top 15
2005	Kmisha Counts	United States Virgin Islands	Top 15
2006	Catherine Jean Milligan	Northern Ireland	Top 17
2007	Irene Dwomoh	Ghana	Top 15
2008	Natalie Griffith	Barbados	Top 15
2009	Lena Ma	Canada	4th Runner-up
2009	Mariatu Kargbo	Sierra Leone	Top 16
2010	Emma Britt Waldron	Ireland	3rd Runner-up
2011	Gabriela Pulgar	Chile (Note: "... Miss England was Miss World 2011 Beach Beauty, Kazakhstan was Miss World 2011 Top Model, while Miss World 2011 Talent title went to Miss Chile ...")	Top 20
2012	Yu Wenxia	China	Miss World 2012
2013	Vania Larissa	Indonesia	Top 10
2014	Dewi Liana Seriestha	Malaysia	Top 25
2015	Lisa Punch	Guyana	Top 11
2016	Bayartsetseg Altangerel	Mongolia	Top 11
2017	Michela Galea	Malta	Top 40
2018	Kanako Date	Japan	Top 30
2019	Toni-Ann Singh	Jamaica	Miss World 2019
2021	Burte-Ujin Anu	Mongolia	Top 40
2023	Imen Mehrzi	Tunisia	Top 40
2025	Monica Kezia Sembiring	Indonesia	Top 40
2026	Grace Richardson	England	Top 40

=== Miss World Sports Challenge ===
Miss World Sports or Sportswoman is a title and award given to the winner of a sports event at Miss World. It is a fast-track or preliminary event, giving the winner automatic entry into the semi-finals. In 2005, there was no Miss Sports winner because it was held as a continental team competition. Starting in 2006, the individual competition returned.

Year	Winner	Represented	Placement at Miss World
2003	Nazanin Afshin-Jam	Canada	1st Runner-up
2004	Amy Guy	Wales	Top 15
2005	Asia-Pacific	Asia	Team Challenge
2006	Malgosia Majewska	Canada	Top 17
2007	Abigail McCarry	United States	Top 15
2008	Alexandra Ívarsdóttir+	Iceland+	Top 15
2009	Erusa Sasaki	Japan	Top 16
2010+	Lori Moore+	Northern Ireland+	Top 25
2011	Marianly Tejeda	Dominican Republic	
2012	Sanna Jinnedal	Sweden	Top 30
2013	Jacqueline Steenbeek+	Netherlands+	Top 20
2014+	Krista Haapalainen+	Finland+	Top 25
2015	Steffi Van Wyk+	Namibia+	
2016	Natalia Short	Cook Islands	Top 20
2017	Aletxa Mueses	Dominican Republic	Top 40
2018	Marisa Butler	United States	Top 30
2019	Rikkiya Brathwaite	British Virgin Islands	Top 40
2021	Karolina Vidales	Mexico	Top 6
2023	Lucija Begić	Croatia	Top 40
2025	Eliise Randmaa	Estonia	Top 40
2026	Suil Pagán	Puerto Rico	Top 40

=== Multimedia Award (Social Media Award) ===
Miss World Multimedia or Social Media Award is a title and award given to the winner of a Multimedia Challenge. It is a fast-track or preliminary event, giving the winner automatic entry into the semi-finals. The score is based on the contestant's likes on Mobstar and Facebook.

Year	Winner	Represented	Placement at Miss World
2012	Vanya Mishra	India	Top 7
2013	Navneet Dhillon	India	Top 20
2014	Elizabeth Safrit	United States	2nd Runner-up
2015	Hillarie Parungao	Philippines	Top 11
2016	Catriona Gray	Philippines	Top 5
2017	Enkhjin Tseveendash	Mongolia	Top 15
2018	Shrinkhala Khatiwada	Nepal	Top 12
2019	Anushka Shrestha	Nepal	Top 12
2021	Olivia Yacé	Côte d'Ivoire	2nd Runner-up
2023	Huỳnh Nguyễn Mai Phương	Vietnam	Top 40
2025	Issie Princesse	Cameroon	Top 40
2025	Mayra Delgado	Dominican Republic	Top 40
2025	Andrea Nikolić	Montenegro	Top 40
2025	Suchata Chuangsri	Thailand	Miss World 2025
2026	Adah Mushibi	Zambia	Top 12

=== Miss World Beach Beauty (Discontinued Event) ===
Miss World Beach Beauty was a swimsuit or fast-track competition. The Beach Beauty event started in 2003, when the Miss World Organization first held fast-track events to automatically give a semi-final spot to some of the delegates. This event allowed the Miss World delegates (over 100) to have a chance to be in the semi-finals. The winner made the semi-finals automatically. The Beach Beauty event showcased different swimsuits designed by Miss World 1975, Wilnelia Merced. In 2013, The Beach Beauty event replaced swimsuit with Balinese sarong. While in 2015, the organisation eliminated the swimsuit competition from the pageant.

Year	Winner	Represented	Placement at Miss World
2003	Rosanna Davison	Ireland	Miss World 2003
2004	Nancy Randall	United States	2nd Runner-up
2005	Yulia Ivanova	Russia	Top 15
2006	Federica Guzmán	Venezuela	Top 17
2007	Ada de la Cruz	Dominican Republic	Top 16
2008	Anagabriela Espinoza	Mexico	Top 15
2009	Kaiane Aldorino	Gibraltar	Miss World 2009
2010	Yara Lasanta	Puerto Rico	Top 25
2011	Alize Lily Mounter	England	Top 7
2012	Sophie Moulds	Wales	1st Runner-up
2013	Sancler Frantz	Brazil	Top 6
2014	Olivia Asplund	Sweden	Top 25

== Miss World hosts and artists ==
The following is a list Miss World hosts and invited artists through the years.

Year	Hosts	Artists
1951, 1952, 1953, 1954, 1955, 1956, 1957, 1958	Eric Morley	
1959	Bob Hope	
1960	Bob Hope	Herald Trumpeters of the Royal Artillery
1961 1962,	David Coleman, Peter West	Bob Hope
1963	Peter West	
1964	Michael Aspel	
1965	David Jacobs, Michael Aspel	Ronnie Carroll, Lionel Blair
1966	Peter West, Michael Aspel	The Three Monarchs, Mark Wynter
1967	Simon Dee, Michael Aspel	Malcolm Roberts, Los Zafiros
1968	Michael Aspel, commentary by Keith Fordyce	Gene Pitney
1969	Michael Aspel, Pete Murray	Frank Ifield, The Roy Budd Trio, Lionel Blair
1970	Bob Hope, Michael Aspel, Keith Fordyce	Lionel Blair
1971, 1972, 1973, 1974	Michael Aspel and David Vine	
1975	David Vine and Ray Moore	
1976	Sacha Distel, Patrick Lichfield, and Ray Moore	
1977	Andy Williams, and Ray Moore	
1978	Sacha Distel and Paul Burnett	
1979	Sacha Distel, Esther Rantzen, Germaine Greer and Ray Moore	
1980	Peter Marshall, Judith Chalmers and Anthony Newley	Anthony Newley and The Dougie Squires Dancers
1981, 1982, 1983, 1984, 1985	Peter Marshall and Judith Chalmers	1981 – Julio Iglesias and The Dougie Squires Dancers 1982 – The Three Degrees 1983 – Leo Sayer and The Ken Warwick Dancers 1984 – The Drifters and The Ken Warwick Dancers 1985 – Jack Jones and The Ken Warwick Dancers
1986	Peter Marshall and Mary Stävin	Five Star and The Ken Warwick Dancers
1987	Peter Marshall and Alexandra Bastedo	Rick Astley and The Ken Warwick Dancers
1988	Peter Marshall and Alexandra Bastedo	Koreana and Donny Osmond
1989	Peter Marshall, Alexandra Bastedo and John Davidson	Aswad
1990	Peter Marshall and Michelle Rocca	Jason Donovan and Richard Clayderman
1991	Peter Marshall and Gina Tolleson	Indecent Obsession
1992	Billy Dee Williams, Jerry Hall, Deborah Shelton, Doreen Morris and Suanne Braun	Abigail Kubheka, Sophia Foster, MarcAlex, Mara Louw, Paul Buckby, Malie Kelly, Leslie Klein-Smith and Soweto String Quartet
1993	Pierce Brosnan, Doreen Morris, Kim Alexis and Gina Tolleson	George Benson, Crissy Caine, Jon Cecil, Sam Marais, PJ Powers and Vicky Sampson
1994	Richard Steinmetz, Suanne Braun and Bronson Pinchot	David Abbate, Yvonne Chaka Chaka, Johnny Clegg, Free Flight Dance Company and Ladysmith Black Mambazo
1995	Richard Steinmetz, Jeff Trachta and Bobbie Eakes	Caught in the Act
1996	Richard Steinmetz and Ruby Bhatia	Alisha Chinnai
1997	Richard Steinmetz and Khanyi Dhlomo Mkhize	Ricky Martin
1998	Eden Harel and Ronan Keating	Boyzone and Errol Brown
1999	Ulrika Jonsson and Melanie Sykes	Robert Palmer, Westlife and Enrique Iglesias
2000	Jerry Springer and Rebecca de Alba	Bryan Ferry, bond, Leonard Cohen and S Club 7
2001	Jerry Springer and Claire Elizabeth Smith	Umoja
2002	Sean Kanan and Claire Elizabeth Smith	Chayanne and BBMak
2003	Phil Keoghan, Amanda Byram and Angela Chow	Luis Fonsi, Bryan Ferry, Morrissey and Wuhan Acrobatic Troupe
2004	Troy McClain, Angela Chow and Lisa Snowdon	Lionel Richie and Il Divo
2005	Tim Vincent and Angela Chow	Alexander O’Neal and Beijing Singing & Dancing Theatre
2006	Tim Vincent, Angela Chow and Grazyna Torbicka	Westlife, Robin Gibb and Amici
2007	Fernando Allende and Angela Chow	Duncan James, Haikou Artistic Group, The South African Mvezo Choir and No. 9 Primary School of Sanya
2008	Tumisho Masha and Angela Chow	McFly, Alesha Dixon, Jeanette Winterson
2009	Angela Chow, Michelle McLean	Umoja, Gang of Instrumentals
2010	Angela Chow, Steve Douglas	Shayne Ward, Dave Koz, Carlos Aponte
2011	Angela Chow, Jason Cook, Steve Douglas	Diversity, Blue, Ramin Karimloo
2012	Myleene Klass, Jason Cook, Lily Wu, Ni Ran Mutu, Steve Douglas	Rodrick Dixon, Huhehaote Youth Horse Cello Troupe
2013	Myleene Klass, Kamal Ibrahim, Daniel Mananta, Amanda Zevannya, Steve Douglas	Matt Cardle, Blue, GIGI Art of Dance, Soerya Soemirat Dance Group, Iskandar Widjaja, Maylaffayza
2014	Tim Vincent, Megan Young, Frankie Cena, Steve Douglas	Sky Blu, The Vamps
2015	Tim Vincent, Megan Young, Angela Chow, Steve Douglas, Neil Krisralam	Yu Wenxia, The Wholls, Julian Believe
2016	Jason Cook, Megan Young, Frankie Cena, Steve Douglas	Rodrick Dixon, Morrison Brothers
2017	Fernando Allende, Angela Chow, Megan Young, Frankie Cena, Barney Walsh, Steve Douglas	Kristian Kostov, Celine Tam, Jeffrey Li, Zizi
2018	Fernando Allende, Angela Chow, Frankie Cena, Megan Young, Stephanie Del Valle, Barney Walsh	Donel Mangena, Dimash Kudaibergen, Sister Sledge
2019	Megan Young, Peter Andre, Stephanie Del Valle, Fernando Allende, Steve Douglas	Peter Andre, Lulu
2021	Peter Andre, Fernando Allende	Don Omar, Gente de Zona, Victor Manuel, Pedro Capó, and The Puerto Rico Symphony Orchestra conducted by Angel Velez with guest conductor Mike Dixon
2023	Karan Johar, Megan Young	Shaan, Neha Kakkar, Tony Kakkar, Toni-Ann Singh
2025	Sachin Kumbhar, Stephanie Del Valle	Ishaan Khatter, Jacqueline Fernandez
2026	Daniel Mejía, Stephanie Del Valle, Lương Thùy Linh	
2027	TBA	

== See also ==
- Beauty with a Purpose – a registered charity and nonprofit organisation associated with Miss World that raises money and participates in humanitarian projects across the world
- Big Four international beauty pageants
