= List of Mutya ng Pilipinas titleholders =

The Mutya ng Pilipinas beauty pageant has produced

- Five Miss Asia Pacific titles: Maria del Carmen Ines Zaragoza in 1982, Gloria Dimayacyac in 1983, Lorna Legaspi in 1989, Michelle Aldana in 1993, and Sharifa Akeel in 2018.
- Five Miss Tourism International titles: Maria Esperanza Corazon Manzano in 2000–2001, Rizzini Alexis Gomez in 2012–2013, Angeli Dione Gomez in 2013–2014, Jannie Loudette Alipo-on in 2017–2018, and Cyrille Payumo in 2019-2020
- Three Miss Tourism Queen of the Year International titles: Sherylle Lynne Santarin in 1996, Racquel Uy in 1999, and Leren Mae Bautista in 2015.
- One Miss Tourism Cosmopolitan International: Barbara Salvador in 2010.
- One Miss Tourism Metropolitan International: Glennifer Perido in 2014.
- One Beauty of the World title: April Love Jordan in 2009.
- One Dream Girl of the year International :Julieane "Aya" Fernandez in 2018

Number of Wins under Mutya ng Pilipinas
Current franchises
Pageant	Title	Winning year(s)
Miss Intercontinental	0	None
World Top Model	0	None
Miss Tourism International	5	2000, 2012, 2013, 2017, 2019
Former franchises
Pageant	Title	Winning year(s)
Beauty of the World	1	2009
Miss Asia Pacific International	5	1982, 1983, 1989, 1993, 2018
Miss Charm International	0	None
Miss Global Beauty Queen	0	None
Miss Intercontinental	0	None
Miss Globe International	0	None
Miss Tourism Cosmopolitan International	1	2010
Miss Tourism Metropolitan International	1	2014, 2022
Miss Tourism Queen of the Year International	3	1996, 1999, 2015
Miss Tourism Universe	0	None
Miss Wonderland International	1	1993
Miss World	0	None

From 1977 to 1991 Mutya ng Pilipinas Asia and Mutya ng Pilipinas World competed in 2 international beauty pageants such as Miss Asia Pacific International and Miss World. The runners-up compete in Miss Wonderland International, Miss Tourism International, Miss Intercontinental, Queen of Clubs International, Queen of the Year and Miss Expo International.

One of the titles of Mutya ng Pilipinas, which was first named Mutya ng Pilipinas Asia has undergone name changes starting from 1965 until 1983 for the Miss Asia Quest. Then it was renamed Mutya ng Pilipinas Asia Pacific for Miss Asia Pacific Quest from 1984 until 2004. In 2005, the title was renamed once again to Mutya ng Pilipinas Asia Pacific International for Miss Asia Pacific International Quest. Then in 2006, the Miss Asia Pacific International pageant was completely & officially scrapped with the national titlist nowhere to compete internationally and was retained for 3 years. The winner in 2006 was sent to Miss Intercontinental and in 2007 to Miss Tourism Metropolitan International.

The Mutya organizers finally changed the title to Mutya ng Pilipinas International in 2008 as the top winner and the second winner as Mutya ng Pilipinas Tourism. In 2010, the top prize received the title of Mutya ng Pilipinas Tourism International and the co-winners with the titles of Mutya ng Pilipinas Intercontinental & Asia Pacific International.

In 2014, Miss Intercontinental Philippines delegates are no longer selected by Mutya ng Pilipinas Organization.

In 2018, the primary winners of the pageant namely Mutya ng Pilipinas Asia Pacific International, Mutya ng Pilipinas Tourism International, Mutya ng Pilipinas Tourism Queen of the Year International, and Mutya ng Pilipinas Global Beauty Queen.

In 2019 (on its 51st year), the franchise and leadership was handed over to Cory Quirino who is now the President of re-branded Mutya Pilipinas, Inc. and Fred Yuson as the Chairman of the Mutya ng Pilipinas, Inc. See Philippines at Pageantry.

After two-year hiatus (2020 and 2021) due to COVID-19 pandemic, on July 27, 2022, a press conference was held in BGC (Bonifacio Global City), Taguig with the organization reverting to its former established name of Mutya ng Pilipinas.

(Mutya (n.) means or synomous to 1. jewel; 2. pearl; 3. charm; 4. darling; 5. amulet.)

The current national winner, Iona Violeta Abrera Gibbs, was crowned as Mutya ng Pilipinas on December 4, 2022. She was the Philippines' flag-bearer at the Miss Intercontinental 2023 pageant where she placed in Top 22.

== Titleholders ==
Color keys

- The contestant won in an international pageant.
- The contestant was a runner-up in an international pageant.
- The contestant was a semifinalist in an international pageant.
- The contestant assumed another title.
- The contestant was not able to compete in an international pageant.
- The contestant did not place but won a special award in the pageant.

=== 1968–1976 ===
Year	Edition	Mutya ng Pilipinas Asia	Runners-up			
Year	Edition	Mutya ng Pilipinas Asia	First (Mutya ng Luzon)	Second (Mutya ng Visayas)	Third (Mutya ng Mindanao)	Fourth (Miss Manila)
1968	1st	Jane Mozo de Joya	Fortune Farro Aleta	Pilar Agcaoili	Mary Grace Iñigo	Marilou Villanueva
1969	2nd	Maria Lourdes Hart Muñoz	Marissa Tiomico	Ana Marie Bautista	Marilou Alas Destreza	Not awarded
1970	3rd	Alice Tiongson Crisostomo	Jean Altavas	Jocelyn Causapin	Arlene de Asis Balmadrid	Not awarded
1971	4th	Carolyn Gomara Masibay	Cecille Galvez Abad-Santos	Mercedes Ocasla Natividad	Armi Barbara Quiray Crespo	Not awarded
1972	5th	Yvette Marie Alfon	Maria Cristina Yambao Ocampo	Felicitas Agoncillo	Malyne Aguirre Fernandez	Not awarded
1973	6th	Maria Lourdes Atienza	Amy Romero Fuster	Ofelia Legaspi Solevilla	Leah Poblador	Not awarded
1974	7th	Maria Paripola Penson	Socorro Suarez Perez	Susan Valdez	Rosabel Carla Asencio	Not awarded
1975	8th	Maricel Fortuno	Regina Marquez	Josefina Juan	Maria Theresa Ludivico	Not awarded
1976	9th	Maria Luisa Corazon Delgado	Christina Tanquintic	Vivian Murphy	Maria Rosario Velilla	Not awarded

=== 1977–1981 ===
Year	Edition	Mutya ng Pilipinas Major Titles				Runners-up		
Year	Edition	World	Asia	Tourism	Trade	First	Second	Third
1977	10th	Anna Melissa Ofilada Veneracion	Rosario Aspillera Díaz	Emma Yuhico	Not awarded	Maria Cristina da Silva	Nenita Hernandez	Evelyn Suzette Suzara
1978	11th	Louvette Monzon Hammond	Epifania Lagman	Mary Yehlen Palabrica Catral	Kathryn Manuel	Normita Garfin	Encarnita Bernardez	Anna Abeja
1979	12th	Josefina Molon Francisco	Lorraine Espiridon Schuck	Visitacion "Tetchie" Agbayani	Not awarded	Visitacion "Tetchie" Agbayani	Elizabeth Serrano	Regina Prada
1980	13th	Maria Milagros Guidote Nabor	Rose Marie de Vera	Rose Marie de Vera	Maria Florlina de la Cruz	Celeste Camille Aphrodite Raymond	Eileen Macapagal	Imelda Santos Ilagan
1981	14th	Suzette Umali Nicolas	Marilou Arguelles Bendigo	Annabelle Maria de Guia	Not awarded	Annabelle Maria de Guia	Maria Araceli Sotaso	Jo Anne Racaza

=== 1982 ===
Year	Edition	Mutya ng Pilipinas Major Titles		Runners-up (Mutya ng)			
Year	Edition	World	Asia	First (Kalayaan)	Second (Kaunlaran)	Third (Maynila)	Fourth (Bagong Republika)
1982	15th	Sarah Jane Coronel Areza	Maria del Carmen Ines del Alcazar Zaragoza	Maria Lourdes Ratcliffe	Wilhelmina Alonso	Fe Morales	Leni Huffana

=== 1983 ===
Year	Edition	Mutya ng Pilipinas Major Titles		Runners-up		
Year	Edition	World	Asia	First	Second	Third
1983	16th	Marilou Sadia Sadiua	Gloria Aranas Dimayacyac	Yoraidyl Diaz Stone	Rachel Anne Bulawin Wolfe	Tina Vallejo Orleans

=== 1984–1985 ===
Year	Edition	Mutya ng Pilipinas Major Titles		Runners-up		
Year	Edition	World	Asia Pacific	First	Second	Third
1984	17th	Aurora Elvira Gayoso Sevilla	Aurora Claudia Mandanas	Adaljiza Custodio	Elizabeth Dumaguing	Jennifer Herrera
1985	18th	Eizabeth Dionisio Cuenco	Millicent Bautista	Arlene Glinoga	Rahjni Faith Pribhdas	Regina Gerona

=== 1986 ===
Year	Edition	Mutya ng Pilipinas Major Titles		Runners-up			
Year	Edition	World	Asia Pacific	Tourism	First	Second	Third
1986	19th	Sherry Rose Austria Byrne	Glenah Marie Valmonte Slaton	Sherry Rose Austria Byrne	Julie Ann Puno Juco	Janet Santos Sales	Mercy Bantolino Ong

=== 1987 ===
Year	Edition	Mutya ng Pilipinas Major Titles		Runners-up				
Year	Edition	World	Asia Pacific	Wonderland	Tourism	First	Second	Third
1987	20th	Maria Lourdes Manalili Apostol	Gina Abalos Vinluan	Mellany Carlos	Mary Gretchen Hernandez	Mellany Carlos (Later became MNP – Wonderland 1987–1988)	Shailah Flores Bautista	Irma Montemayor

=== 1988 ===
Year	Edition	Mutya ng Pilipinas Major Titles			Runners-up		
Year	Edition	World	Asia Pacific	Wonderland	Tourism	First	Second
1988	21st	Dana Mayor Narvadez	Maria Hyacinth Valencia Lotuaco	Gladys May Coros Fauni	Mary Jean Rosales	Rosario Antoinette Realiza	Maria Jordana Blardony

=== 1989–1990 ===
Year	Edition	Mutya ng Pilipinas Major Titles					Runners-up	
Year	Edition	World	Asia Pacific	Globe	Charm	Wonderland	First	Second
1989	22nd	Estrella Singson Querubin	Lorna Villanueva Legaspi	Angela Yoriko Figueras	Laura Patricia Marnelego	Viftra Burgos	Raquel Mababangloob	Mary Jane Umali
1990	23rd	Antonette Elizalde Ballesteros	Mutya Crisostomo Laxa	Carla Blanco Perez	Amelia Joy dela Cruz	Maria Clarissa Domingo	Donna Fe Roque	Julie Shiela Imperial Jovellanos

=== 1991 ===
Year	Edition	Mutya ng Pilipinas Major Titles				Runners-up	
Year	Edition	World	Asia Pacific	Globe	Tourism	First	First
1991	24th	Gemith Gonzaga Gemparo	Mutya Crisostomo Laxa (Assumed her MNP – Asia Pacific title for two years due to no pageant held in 1990 & 1991. Competed at Miss Asia Pacific 1992)	Shawnaleh Arevalo (Later became MNP – Queen of the Clubs International 1993)	Vivian Gobaton	Armi Rose Santiago	Sheila Yumang
1992	No local pageant held due to natural calamities in the country. Binibining Pilipinas Charities, Inc. took over the Miss World franchise in 1992.						

=== 1993 ===
Year	Edition	Mutya ng Pilipinas Major Titles		Runners-up		
Year	Edition	Asia Pacific	Globe	First	Second	Third
1993	25th	Michelle Aldana	Carol Quiño	Maria Teresa Pabular (Later became MNP – Tourism Queen of the Year International)	Jill de la Cerna	Maria Riza Martinez (Later became MNP – Tourism International)

=== 1994–1995 ===
Year	Edition	Mutya ng Pilipinas Major Title	Runners-up			
Year	Edition	Asia Pacific	First	Second	Third	Fourth
1994	26th	Angelica Jasmine Berroya Reyes	Karen Sanz Espino (Later became MNP – Queen of the Clubs International 1995)	Marjorie Poblador	Sherilyne Uy Reyes (aka Sherilyn Reyes-Tan (Later became MNP – Tourism International)	Jojit Punsalan (Later became MNP – Tourism Queen of the Year International)
1995	27th	Maricel Gomez Morales	Faith Amigo (Later became MNP – Intercontinental)	Daisy Garcia Reyes (Later became MNP – Expo International)	Claryce Dizon	Morena Carla Cabrera (Later became MNP – Tourism Queen of the Year International)

=== 1996–1999 ===
Year	Edition	Mutya ng Pilipinas Major Title	Runners-up			
Year	Edition	Asia Pacific	First	Second	Third	Fourth
1996	28th	Marilyn Maristela	Erlinda Mejia (Later became MNP – Intercontinental)	Maria Teresita Legacion	Ellaine Crispy Miles (Later became MNP – Queen of the Clubs International 1997)	Sherylle Lynne Santarin (Later became MNP – Tourism Queen of the Year International & Miss Tourism Queen of the Year International)
1997	29th	Esabela Molina Cabrera (Later abdicated her title)	Sheryll Moraga (Later assumed the title)	Rosario Gonzalez (Later became MNP – Intercontinental)	Preciosa Reyes Valencia (Later became MNP – Tourism Queen of the Year International)	Chanda Nogra (Later became MNP – Queen of the Clubs International 1998)
1997	29th	Sheryll Moraga (Later assumed the title)	Rosario Gonzalez (Later became MNP – Intercontinental)	Preciosa Reyes Valencia (Later became MNP – Tourism Queen of the Year International)	Chanda Nogra (Later became MNP – Queen of the Clubs International 1998)	Mellany Gabat (Later became MNP – Tourism International)
1998	30th	Rochelle Romero Ong	Heidi Punsalan	Michelle delos Santos	Apple Atienza	Renabelle David
1999	31st	Ritchie Ocampo	Ruaina Salcedo Kiram	Racquel Uy (Later became Miss Tourism Queen of the Year International)	Jeannie Alota Andersen	Christine dela Cruz Heap (Later became MNP – Queen of the Clubs International 2000)

=== 2000–2004 ===
Year	Edition	Mutya ng Pilipinas Major Title	Runners-up			
Year	Edition	Asia Pacific	First	Second	Third	Fourth
2000	32nd	Josephine Nieves Canonizado	Marie Pearl C. Acas	Christine Anne de Jesus (Later became MNP – Tourism Queen of the Year International)	Maria Esperanza Corazon Acosta Manzano (Later became MNP – Tourism International & Miss Tourism International)	Macbeth Maybituin Abuzo (Later became MNP – Queen of the Clubs International 2001)
2001	33rd	Darlene Carbungco	Michelle Ann Jimenez Peñez (Later became MNP – Tourism Universe)	Mimilannie P. Lisondra	Mary Liza B. Diño (Later became MNP – Tourism International)	Janice Gay M. Alop
2002	34th	Miriam San Jose Chui	Kristine Caballero	Frances Margaret Arreza (Later became MNP – Tourism International)	Mae Lagasca	Genevieve Siao
2003	35th	Jamie Liz Castillo	Angeline Tucio (Later became MNP – Tourism International)	Fiona Marie Lava	Alicia Victoria Altares	Clarice Ploteña
2004	36th	Jedah Casabuela Hernandez (Competed at Miss Asia Pacific International 2005 instead of Maria Carmeniezinas Nicolosi)	Eizza Rancesca Lim (Later became MNP – Tourism International)	Carmelle Olivia Hebron	Diana Jean Espidido (Later became MNP – Tourism Queen of the Year International)	Raichelle Mae "Gigette" Pacquiao

=== 2005 ===
Year	Edition	Mutya ng Pilipinas Major Title	Runners-up			
Year	Edition	MNP – Asia Pacific International	First	Second	Third	Fourth
2005	37th	Maria Carmeniezinas Maxilom Nicolosi (Unable to fulfill her competition)	Katharina Enocida Koegel	Arabella Ordoñez Hanesh (Later became MNP – Tourism International)	Abigail Lesley Cruz (Later became MNP – Tourism Queen of the Year International)	Namkeen Soller Hameed (Later became MNP – Intercontinental)

=== 2006–2007 ===
Year	Edition	Mutya ng Pilipinas Major Titles		Special Title	Runners-up		
Year	Edition	Mutya ng Pilipinas – Asia Pacific International	Mutya ng Pilipinas – Tourism International	Mutya ng Pilipinas – Overseas Communities	First	Second	Third
2006	38th	Kirby Ann Basken (Later became MNP – Intercontinental)	Vera Eumee Reiter	Christine Adela White (Canada)	Patricia Isabel Fernandez	April Love Jordan	Lorraine Erum
2007	39th	Zephora Mayon (Abdicated her title)	Ana Marie Morelos (Later became MNP – Tourism Metropolitan International)	Jacquiline Charlebois Rodriguez (San Fernando Valley, California, USA)	Iris Frances Tan	Ricamarie Anne Taylor	Jacquiline Rodriguez

=== 2008 ===
Year	Edition	Mutya ng Pilipinas Major Titles		Special Title	Runners-up	
Year	Edition	Mutya ng Pilipinas – International	Mutya ng Pilipinas – Tourism Puerto Princesa	Mutya ng Pilipinas – Overseas Communities	First	Second
2008	40th	Jonavi Raisa Quiray (Competed at Miss Tourism International 2009 instead of Jane Bañares)	Jam Charish Libatog (Competed at Miss Tourism International 2008)	Loren Andre Burgos (California, USA)	Katrina Grace Rigets	Queency Bernalez

=== 2009 ===
Year	Edition	Mutya ng Pilipinas Major Titles		Special Title	Runners-up	
Year	Edition	Mutya ng Pilipinas – International	Mutya ng Pilipinas – Tourism Aurora	Mutya ng Pilipinas – Overseas Communities	First	Second
2009	41st	Jane Bañares	Jacqueline Schubert (Later became MNP – Intercontinental)	Ana Maria Baladad (Texas, USA)	Samantha East	Jennielyn Natividad

=== 2010 ===
Year	Edition	Mutya ng Pilipinas Major Titles			Special Title	Runners-up	
Year	Edition	Mutya ng Pilipinas – Asia Pacific International	Mutya ng Pilipinas – Tourism International	MNP – Intercontinental	Mutya ng Pilipinas – Overseas Communities	First	Second
2010	42nd	Christi Lynn McGarry (Later became MNP – Intercontinental)	Barbara Salvador (Later became Miss Tourism Cosmopolitan International)	Carla Jenina Lizardo	Christi Lynn McGarry (East Coast USA)	Suzette Hernandez	Sharon Grace Angel

=== 2011 ===
Year	Edition	Mutya ng Pilipinas Major Titles		Special Title	Runners-up	
Year	Edition	Mutya ng Pilipinas – International	Mutya ng Pilipinas – Tourism	Mutya ng Pilipinas – Overseas Communities	First	Second
2011	43rd	Vickie Marie Rushton	Felicia Baron	Bea Rose Santiago (Canada)	Diana Sunshine Rademann (Later became MNP – Tourism International)	Tifani Alexandra Grimes

=== 2012 ===
Year	Edition	Mutya ng Pilipinas Major Titles		Special Title	Runners-up	
Year	Edition	Mutya ng Pilipinas – Intercontinental	Mutya ng Pilipinas – Tourism International	Mutya ng Pilipinas – Overseas Communities	First	Second
2012	44th	Camille Guevarra	Rizzini Alexis Gomez	Marbee Tiburcio (Northern California, USA)	Emma Mary Tiglao	Larah Grace Lacap

=== 2013–2016 ===
Year	Edition	Mutya ng Pilipinas Major Titles		Special Title	Runners-up	
Year	Edition	Mutya ng Pilipinas – Asia Pacific International	Mutya ng Pilipinas – Tourism International	Mutya ng Pilipinas – Overseas Communities	First	Second
2013	45th	Andrea Koreen Medina (Later became MNP – Intercontinental)	Angeli Dionne Gomez	Asdis Lisa Karlsdottir (Iceland)	Maureen Ann Montagne	Kristian Aubrey Nolasco
2014	46th	Eva Psychee Patalinjug (Unable to fulfill her competition)	Glennifer Perido (Later became Miss Tourism Metropolitan International)	Patrizia Lucia Bosco (Milan, Italy)	Cristine Racel	Kim Fyfe
2015	47th	Leren Mae Bautista (Later became MNP – Tourism Queen of the Year International & Miss Tourism Queen of the Year International)	Janela Joy Cuaton	Nina Josie Robertson (Australia)	Julee Ann Marie Bourgoin	Brenna Cassandra Gamboa
2016	48th	Ganiel Akrisha Krishnan	Justin Mae San Jose	Michelle Thorlund (California, USA)	Lynette Bradford	Ashley Nicole Singh (Later became MNP – Tourism Queen of the Year International)

=== 2017 ===
Year	Edition	Mutya ng Pilipinas Major Titles			Special Title	Runners-up	
Year	Edition	Mutya ng Pilipinas – Asia Pacific International	Mutya ng Pilipinas – Tourism International	Mutya ng Pilipinas – Top Model of the World	Mutya ng Pilipinas – Overseas Communities	First	Second
2017	49th	Ilene Astrid de Vera	Jannie Loudette Alipo-on	Hannah Khayle Iglesia (Later became MNP – AMA Asian International Supermodel)	Savannah Mari Gankiewicz (Hawaii, USA)	Angela Carla Sandigan (Later became MNP – Tourism Queen of the Year International)	Sofia Marie Sibug (Later became MNP – Global Beauty Queen)

=== 2018 ===
Year	Edition	Mutya ng Pilipinas Major Titles				Special Title	Runners-up	
Year	Edition	Mutya ng Pilipinas – Asia Pacific International	Mutya ng Pilipinas – Tourism International	Mutya ng Pilipinas – Tourism Queen of the Year International	Mutya ng Pilipinas – Global Beauty Queen	Mutya ng Pilipinas – Overseas Communities	First	Second
2018	50th	Sharifa Akeel	Julieane Fernandez	Keshapornam Ramachandran	Pauline Amelinckx	Jade Skye Roberts (Australia)	Mary Justine Teng	Kristine Micah Malicsi

=== 2019 ===
Year	Edition	Mutya Pilipinas Major Titles			Special Title	Runners-up	
Year	Edition	Mutya Pilipinas – Asia Pacific International	Mutya Pilipinas – World Top Model	Mutya Pilipinas – Tourism International	Mutya Pilipinas – Overseas Communities	First	Second
2019	51st	Klyza Castro	April May Short	Tyra Rae Goldman (Later became MP - Top Model of the World)	Louise Janica An (California, USA)	Cyrille Payumo (Later became MP - Tourism International and Miss Tourism International)	Maxinne Nicole Rangel
2020	No local pageant held due to COVID 19 pandemic.						
2021	No local pageant held due to COVID 19 pandemic.						

=== 2022 - 2023 ===
Mutya ng Pilipinas Pageant 2022 and 2023 editions conjoined with finals held the 4th of December, 2022 with all major winners competing for 2023.

Year	Edition	Mutya ng Pilipinas Major Titles			Special Title	Runners-up			
Year	Edition	Mutya ng Pilipinas – Intercontinental	Mutya ng Pilipinas – World Top Model	Mutya ng Pilipinas – Tourism International	Mutya ng Pilipinas – Overseas Communities	Mutya ng Pilipinas – Luzon	Mutya ng Pilipinas – Luzon	Mutya ng Pilipinas – Visayas	Mutya ng Pilipinas – Mindanao
2022	52nd	Iona Violeta Gibbs	Arianna Kyla Padrid	Jeanette Reyes	Jesi Mae Cruz (California, USA)	Shannon Robinson (Later became MP - Environment International)	Shannon Robinson (Later became MP - Environment International)	Megan Deen Campbell (Later became MP - World Top Model)	Marcelyn Bautista
2023	No local pageant held due to 2022 event held in December with the winners competing internationally in 2023 and 1st quarter of 2024.								

=== 2024 ===
Year	Edition	Mutya ng Pilipinas Major Titles				Special Titles		Runners-up		
Year	Edition	Mutya ng Pilipinas – Intercontinental	Mutya ng Pilipinas – World Top Model	Mutya ng Pilipinas – Tourism International	Mutya ng Pilipinas – Environment International	Mutya ng Pilipinas – Overseas Communities	Mutya ng Pilipinas – Charity	Mutya ng Pilipinas – Luzon	Mutya ng Pilipinas – Visayas	Mutya ng Pilipinas – Mindanao
2024	53rd	Alyssa Marie Redondo	Anne Klein Castro	Liana Rose Barrido	Arianna Pantaleon	Aiyen Ysabel Maquiraya (Washington, USA)	Xena Ramos (Later became MP - Global)	Christine Eds Enero (Later became MP - Tourism International	Stacey de Ocampo	Jireh Mayani

=== 2025 ===
Year	Edition	Mutya ng Pilipinas Major Titles			Special Titles		Runners-up		
Year	Edition	Mutya ng Pilipinas – Intercontinental	Mutya ng Pilipinas – World Top Model	Mutya ng Pilipinas – Tourism International	Mutya ng Pilipinas – Overseas Communities	Mutya ng Pilipinas – Charity	Mutya ng Pilipinas – Luzon	Mutya ng Pilipinas – Visayas	Mutya ng Pilipinas – Mindanao
2025	54th	Christina Vanhefflin	Naomi Raine Wainwright	Ma. Andrea Endicio (Later became MP - Polo Universe)	Mahalia Bangit (Melbourne, Australia)	Ali Honee Posuemalto	Lyndzy Blyss Maranan (Later became MP - Global Universe	Eunice Deza (Later became MP - Top Model of the World)	Juliana Fresado

=== 2026 ===
Year	Edition	Mutya ng Pilipinas Major Titles					Special Titles		Runners-up		
Year	Edition	Mutya ng Pilipinas – Intercontinental	Mutya ng Pilipinas – Top Model of the World	Mutya ng Pilipinas – World Top Model	Mutya ng Pilipinas – Polo Universe	Mutya ng Pilipinas – Global Universe	Mutya ng Pilipinas – Charity	Mutya ng Pilipinas – Overseas Communities	Mutya ng Pilipinas – Luzon	Mutya ng Pilipinas – Visayas	Mutya ng Pilipinas – Mindanao
2026	55th	Josiela Lagrimas	Ciely Ann Ycoy	Lisa Marie Jane Craven	Jessica Deladia	Lyra Punsalan	Iris Oresca	Natalie Jewelle Reyes	Maureen Mungcal	Patricia Dueñas	Claire Cacal

== Former titles ==
=== Mutya ng Pilipinas – Asia Pacific International ===
formerly Miss Asia and Miss Asia Pacific Quest

(Also called Mutya ng Pilipinas Intercontinental or Mutya ng Pilipinas Asia Pacific or Mutya ng Pilipinas Asia Pacific Int'l or Mutya ng Pilipinas International. The titles given annually by the organizers of Mutya ng Pilipinas, Inc. have undergone multiple name changing).

Winners were sent to the revamped Miss Asia Pacific International Pageant until 2005.

The international pageant was discontinued in 2006 but Mutya ng Pilipinas, Inc. continued to crown the Mutya ng Pilipinas Asia Pacific title up to 2013 even if the international pageant was defunct back in 2006.

The winner were previously assigned to compete at Miss Intercontinental Pageant and in some occasions Miss Tourism International started in 2006 until 2013. Miss Asia Pacific International pageant was revived once again and held in 2016 up to 2019. The COVID19 pandemic emerged in 2020 resulting in discontinuation of said pageant for three consecutive years and up to the present.

Color key

- Declared as Miss Asia Pacific International
- Ended as Runner-up in Miss Asia Pacific International
- Ended as one of the Top Semi-Finalists in Miss Asia Pacific International

Year	Delegate	Hometown	Local/National Title	International Pageant	Placement	Other awards
1965	Resurreccion Vianzon			Miss Asia	Second Runner-up	None
1968	Mary Jane Mozo de Joya		Mutya ng Pilipinas	Miss Asia	Third Runner-up	None
1969	Maria Lourdes Hart Muñoz		Mutya ng Pilipinas	Miss Asia	Unplaced	None
1970	Alice Tiongson Crisostomo		Mutya ng Pilipinas	Miss Asia	First Runner-up	None
1971	Carolyn Gomora Masibay		Mutya ng Pilipinas	Miss Asia	First Runner-up	None
1972	Yvette Marie Alfon		Mutya ng Pilipinas	Miss Asia	First Runner-up	None
1973	Maria Lourdes Atienza		Mutya ng Pilipinas	Miss Asia	Unplaced	None
1974	Maria Paripola Penson		Mutya ng Pilipinas	Miss Asia	Second Runner-up	None
1975	Maricel Fortuno		MNP – Asia	Miss Asia	Unplaced	None
1976	Maria Luisa Corazon Delgado		MNP – Asia	Miss Asia	Third Runner-up	None
1977	Maria Rosario Aspillera Diaz	Aringay, La Union	MNP – Asia	Miss Asia	Fourth Runner-up	None
1978	Epifania Lagman		MNP – Asia	Miss Asia	First Runner-up	None
1979	Lorraine Espiridon Schuck		MNP – Asia	Miss Asia	Second Runner-up	None
1980	Rosa Maria de Vera		MNP – Asia	Miss Asia	First Runner-up	None
1981	Marilou Arguelles Bendigo	Davao City, Davao del Sur	MNP – Asia	Miss Asia	Unplaced	None
1982	Maria del Carmen Ines del Alcazar Zaragoza		MNP – Asia	Miss Asia	Miss Asia 1982	None
1983	Gloria Aranas Dimayacyac		MNP – Asia	Miss Asia	Miss Asia 1983	Best in Swimwear
1984	Aurora Claudia Mandanas		MNP – Asia Pacific	Miss Asia Pacific	Top 10 Semi-Finalist	None
1985	Millicent Bautista		MNP – Asia Pacific	Miss Asia Pacific	Top 12 Semi-Finalist	None
1986	Glenah Marie Valmonte Slaton		MNP – Asia Pacific	Miss Asia Pacific	Top 16 Semi-Finalist	None
1987	Gina Abalos Vinluan		MNP – Asia Pacific	Miss Asia Pacific	Top 15 Semi-Finalist	None
1988	Maria Hyacinth Valencia Lotuaco	Manila, Metro Manila	MNP – Asia Pacific	Miss Asia Pacific	Unplaced	None
1989	Lorna Villanueva Legaspi	Manila, Metro Manila	MNP – Asia Pacific	Miss Asia Pacific	Miss Asia Pacific 1989	Miss Talent
1990	Mutya Crisostomo Laxa	Manila, Metro Manila	MNP – Asia Pacific	No international pageant held due to natural calamities in the country	None	
1991	Mutya Crisostomo Laxa	Manila, Metro Manila	MNP – Asia Pacific	No international pageant held due to natural calamities in the country	None	
1992	Mutya Crisostomo Laxa	Manila, Metro Manila	MNP – Asia Pacific	Miss Asia Pacific	Second Runner-up	None
1993	Michele Zulueta Aldana	Bulacan	MNP – Asia Pacific	Miss Asia Pacific	Miss Asia Pacific 1993	Miss Photogenic; Miss Friendship
1994	Angelica Jasmine Berroya Reyes	Bulacan	MNP – Asia Pacific	Miss Asia Pacific	Top 12 Semi-Finalist	None
1995	Maricel Gomez Morales	Angeles City	MNP – Asia Pacific	Miss Asia Pacific	Top 12 Semi-Finalist	Miss Photogenic
1996	Marilyn Gozon Maristela	Mabalacat, Pampanga	MNP – Asia Pacific	Miss Asia Pacific	First Runner-up	None
1997	Esabella Morena Cabrera	Metro Manila	MNP – Asia Pacific	N/A	N/A	N/A
1997	Sheryll Rodriguez Moraga	Metro Manila	MNP – Asia Pacific	Miss Asia Pacific	Top 10 Semi-Finalist	Miss Friendship; Miss Photogenic; Miss Talent; Miss Creme Silk Beautiful Hair
1998	Rochelle Romero Ong	Metro Manila	MNP – Asia Pacific	Miss Asia Pacific	Unplaced	Miss Friendship; Miss Creme Silk Beautiful Hair
1999	Ritchie Guevarra Ocampo	Pampanga	MNP – Asia Pacific	Miss Asia Pacific	Top 10 Semi-Finalist	Miss Photogenic; Miss Lux Super Rich Beautiful Hair
2000	Josephine Nieves Canonizado	Mandaluyong, Metro Manila	MNP – Asia Pacific	Miss Asia Pacific	Unplaced	Best in Evening Gown; Miss Creme Silk Beautiful Hair
2001	Darlene Zimmer Carbungco	Angeles City	MNP – Asia Pacific	Miss Asia Pacific	Fourth Runner-up	Miss Close-Up Smile
2002	Miriam San Jose Chui	California, United States	MNP – Asia Pacific	Miss Asia Pacific	Third Runner-up	Miss Cremesilk Beautiful Hair; Miss Telegenic
2003	Jamie Liz Lazcano Castillo	Malabon, Metro Manila	MNP – Asia Pacific	Miss Asia Pacific	Top 10 Semi-Finalist	People's Choice
2004	Jedah Casabuela Hernandez^{1}	Cabuyao, Laguna	MNP – Asia Pacific International	Miss Asia Pacific International	No Miss Asia Pacific International Pageant	
2005	Jedah Casabuela Hernandez^{2}	Cabuyao, Laguna	MNP – Asia Pacific International	Miss Asia Pacific International	Fourth Runner-up	Best in Evening Gown/Best Hair
2005	Maria Carmeniezinas Maxilom Nicolosi ^{3}	Milan, Italy	MNP – Asia Pacific International		Did not compete	
2006	Kirby Ann Basken*^{4}	Norway	MNP – Asia Pacific International	Miss Intercontinental	Top 12	None
2007	Zephora Aldana Mayon ^{5}	Las Piñas, Metro Manila	MNP – Asia Pacific International		Abdicated her Crown and Title	
2008	Jonavi Raisa Bernas Quiray ^{6}	Puerto Princesa, Palawan	MNP – International		No Miss Asia Pacific International Pageant	
2009	Jane Riel Bañares ^{7}	Legaspi City, Albay	MNP – International		No Miss Asia Pacific International Pageant	
2010	Carla Jenina Cabrera Lizardo ^{8}	Bicol	MNP – Intercontinental		Did not compete	
2010	Christi Lynn Landrito McGarry ^{8}	Jersey City, New Jersey	MNP – Asia Pacific International	Miss Intercontinental	Top 15	Continental Queen of Asia and the Pacific
2011	Vickie Marie Milagrosa Sausa Rushton ^{9}	Bacolod, Negros Occidental	MNP – International		No Miss Asia Pacific International Pageant	
2012	Camille Manalang Guevarra ^{10}	Porac, Pampanga	MNP – Intercontinental	Miss Intercontinental	Unplaced	None
2013	Andrea Koreen Garcia Medina	Quezon City, Metro Manila	MNP – Asia Pacific International	Miss Intercontinental	3rd Runner-up	Continental Queen of Asia and Oceania
2014	Eva Psychee Soroño Patalinjug^{11}	Cebu City, Cebu	MNP – Asia Pacific International		No Miss Asia Pacific International Pageant	
2015	Leren Mae Magnaye Bautista	Los Baños, Laguna	MNP – Asia Pacific International	Miss Tourism Queen of the Year International	Miss Tourism Queen of the Year International	None
2016	Ganiel Akrisha Atun Krishnan	Manila, Metro Manila	MNP – Asia Pacific International	Miss Asia Pacific International	Second Runner-up	None
2017	Ilene Astrid Cañete de Vera	Cebu City	MNP – Asia Pacific International	Miss Asia Pacific International	Fourth Runner-up	None
2018	Sharifa Mangatong Areef Mohammad Omar Akeel	Lebak, Sultan Kudarat	MNP – Asia Pacific International	Miss Asia Pacific International	Miss Asia Pacific International 2018	Darling of the Press
2019	Klyza Ferrando Castro	Davao City	MP – Asia Pacific International	Miss Asia Pacific International	Top 20	Asia's Continental Queen
2020	No Miss Asia Pacific International pageant held due to COVID 19 pandemic.					
2021	No Miss Asia Pacific International pageant held due to COVID 19 pandemic.					
2022	No Miss Asia Pacific International pageant held. Temporarily discontinued.					
2023	Franchise acquired by Empire Philippines Holdings, Inc.					

=== Mutya ng Pilipinas – Tourism International ===
(Also called Mutya ng Pilipinas – Tourism or Mutya ng Pilipinas Tourism Puerto Princesa in 2008 and Mutya ng Pilipinas Tourism Aurora in 2009.) Winners were delegated as Ambassadors of the Philippine Department of Tourism.)

From 1994, winners or appointed representatives were sent to the Miss Tourism International Pageant.

Year	National Title	Delegate	Hometown	International Pageant	Placement	Other awards
1975	Mutya ng Pilipinas – Tourism 1975	Rosario Marissa Recto				
1976	Mutya ng Pilipinas – Tourism 1976	Evangeline Evangelista				
1977	Mutya ng Pilipinas – Tourism 1977	Emma Yuhico				
1978	Mutya ng Pilipinas – Tourism 1978	Mary Yehlen Catral				
1979	Mutya ng Pilipinas – Tourism 1979	Visitacion Agbayani				
1980	Mutya ng Pilipinas – Tourism 1980	Rose Marie de Vera				
1981	Mutya ng Pilipinas – Tourism 1981	Annabelle de Guia				
1986	Mutya ng Pilipinas – Tourism 1986	Sherry Rose Byrne				
1987	Mutya ng Pilipinas – Tourism 1987	Mary Gretchen Hernandez				
1988	Mutya ng Pilipinas – Tourism 1988	Mary Jean Rosales				
1991	Mutya ng Pilipinas – Tourism 1991	Vivian Gobaton				
1994	Mutya ng Pilipinas 1993 – 3rd Runner Up (Appointed)	Maria Riza Martinez	Makati City	Miss Tourism International	4th Runner Up	
1995	Mutya ng Pilipinas 1994 – 3rd Runner Up (Appointed)	Sherilyne Reyes	Cebu City	Miss Tourism International	3rd Runner Up	
1996	There were no international pageant held					
1997	There were no international pageant hel held					
1998	Mutya ng Pilipinas 1998 – 4th Runner Up (Appointed)	Mellany Gabat	Metro Manila	Miss Tourism International	2nd Runner Up	
1999	Mutya ng Pilipinas 1999 –1st Runner Up (Appointed)	Racquel Uy	Quezon City	Miss Tourism International	1st Runner Up	Miss Tourism Queen of the Year International 1999
2000	Mutya ng Pilipinas 2000 – 3rd Runner Up (Appointed)	Maria Esperanza Corazon Manzano	Quezon City	Miss Tourism International	Miss Tourism International 2000	
2001	Mutya ng Pilipinas 2001 – 3rd Runner Up (Appointed)	Mary Liza Diño	Marikina City	Miss Tourism International	Unplaced	
2002	Mutya ng Pilipinas 2002 – 2nd Runner Up (Appointed)	Frances Margaret Arreza	Las Piñas City	Miss Tourism International	Top 10	
2003	Mutya ng Pilipinas 2003 – 1st Runner Up (Appointed)	Angeline Tucio	Iriga City	Miss Tourism International	Unplaced	
2004	Mutya ng Pilipinas 2004 – 1st Runner Up	Eizza Rancesca Lim	Rizal	Miss Tourism International	Unplaced	
2005	Mutya ng Pilipinas 2005 – 2nd Runner Up (Appointed)	Arabella Hanesh	Pangasinan	Miss Tourism International	Unplaced	
2006	Mutya ng Pilipinas – Tourism International 2006	Vera Eumee Reiter	Quezon City	Miss Tourism International	Unplaced	
2007	Mutya ng Pilipinas – Tourism International 2007	Ana Marie Morelos^{12}	Valenzuela City	Miss Tourism Metropolitan International	4th Runner Up	
2008	Mutya ng Pilipinas – Tourism Puerto Princesa 2008	Jam Charish Libatog	Cebu City	Miss Tourism International	Top 15	
2009	Mutya ng Pilipinas – International 2009	Jane Riel Bañares^{13}	Legazpi City		Did not compete	
2009	Mutya ng Pilipinas – International 2008	Jonavi Raisa Quiray^{14}	Palawan	Miss Tourism International	Unplaced	
2010	Mutya ng Pilipinas – Tourism International 2010	Barbara dela Rosa Salvador	Pangasinan	Miss Tourism International	3rd Runner Up	Miss Tourism Cosmopolitan International 2010
2011	Mutya ng Pilipinas 2011 – 1st Runner Up (Appointed)	Diana Sunshine Rademann^{16}	Puerto Princesa City	Miss Tourism International	Unplaced	
2012	Mutya ng pilipinas – Tourism International 2012	Rizzini Alexis Gomez	Mandaue City	Miss Tourism International	Miss Tourism International 2012	
2013	Mutya ng Pilipinas – Tourism International 2013	Angeli Dione Gomez	Cebu City	Miss Tourism International	Miss Tourism International 2013	
2014	Mutya ng Pilipinas – Tourism International 2014	Glennifer Perido	Cordilleras	Miss Tourism International	2nd Runner Up	Miss Tourism Metropolitan International 2014
2015	Mutya ng Pilipinas – Tourism International 2015	Janela Joy Cuaton	Doha, Qatar	Miss Tourism Metropolitan International 2016	1st Runner Up	
2016	Mutya ng Pilipinas – Tourism International 2016	Justin Mae San Jose	Calabarzon	Miss Tourism International	Unplaced	
2017	Mutya ng Pilipinas – Tourism International 2017	Jannie Loudette Alipo-on	Navotas	Miss Tourism International	Miss Tourism International 2017	
2018	Mutya ng Pilipinas – Tourism International 2018	Julieane "Aya" Fernandez	Taguig City	Miss Tourism International	4th Runner Up	Dream Girl of the Year International 2018
2019	Mutya Pilipinas 2019 – 1st Runner Up > Mutya Pilipinas – Tourism International 2019 (Appointed)	Cyrille Payumo	Pampanga	Miss Tourism International	Miss Tourism International 2019	Best in National Costume
2020	Appointed by other organization	Kathie Lee Berco		Miss Tourism International	Unplaced	
2021	Mutya Pilipinas 2019 - Top 12 Finalist (Appointed)	Keinth Jesen Petrasanta	Laguna	Miss Tourism International	6th Runner Up	Miss South East Asia Tourism Ambassadress 2021
2022	Mutya Pilipinas 2019 – Top 20 Finalist (Appointed)	Maria Angelica Pantaliano	Mandaue City	Miss Tourism International	2nd Runner Up	Miss Tourism Metropolitan International 2022 Miss Photogenic
2023	Mutya ng Pilipinas – Tourism International 2022	Jeanette Reyes	Camarines Sur	Miss Tourism International	2nd Runner Up	Miss Tourism Metropolitan International 2023 Miss South East Asia Tourism Ambassadress 2023
2024	Mutya ng Pilipinas – Tourism International 2024	Liana Rose Barrido	Batangas City	Miss Tourism International	Miss Tourism International 2024	Miss Vitality
2025	Mutya ng Pilipinas – Luzon 2024 (Appointed)	Christine Eds Enero	Parañaque	Miss Tourism International	1st Runner-Up	Miss Tourism Queen of the Year International 2025
2026	Mutya ng Pilipinas – Tourism International 2025 > Mutya ng Pilipinas - Tourism 2025	Ma. Andrea Endicio	Candelaria, Quezon	Did not compete due to transfer of Miss Tourism International franchise in Miss World Philippines		

- Note: From 1975 until 1991, the Mutya ng Pilipinas Tourism winners were not sent to any particular international pageant. The years 1982–1985, 1989, 1992 and 1993, no winners selected.
- DNC/NIPH – Did not compete / No International Pageant Held.
- N/A – Not Applicable
