= Miss Bicolandia =

Beauty pageant

- Type: Beauty pageant
- Headquarters: Naga, Philippines

Miss Bicolandia is an annual regional beauty pageant that is run by the Naga City Government. It is the oldest running beauty pageant in Bicol Region, Philippines. It is held during the Peñafrancia Festival in September in Naga.

== Titleholders ==
Year	Miss Bicolandia	Hometown	National Pageant Competition	International Pageant Competition
2026	No competition held due to the mounting financial challenges			
2025	Iris Oresca	Naga	Binibining Pilipinas 2026 candidate Mutya ng Pilipinas 2026 Charity	
2024c	Mikki Angela B. Barcela	Bacacay		
2023	Reynaleen Dimaculangan Praferosa	Naga		
2022	Rheema Adakkoden	Naga	Binibining Pilipinas 2023 candidate	
2021	No competition held due to the COVID-19 pandemic			
2020	No competition held due to the COVID-19 pandemic			
2019	Paulina Labayo	Naga	Binibining Pilipinas 2023 candidate Miss World Philippines 2018 Top 16	
2018	Famaele Nica Carriaga	Legazpi		
2017	Kayesha Clauden Chua	Legazpi	Miss World Philippines 2019 Top 22; Binibining Pilipinas 2018 Top 25 Miss Asia Awards 2019	
2016	Jian Cayla Salazar	Guinobatan	Miss Philippines Earth 2015 Top 10	
2015	Ara Isabel Diocos	Naga		
2014	Casey Anne Austria	Legazpi	Miss World Philippines 2015 candidate Miss Philippines Earth 2013 candidate	
2013	Angelica Mae Corbe	Legazpi	Binibining Pilipinas 2018 candidate	
2012	Yvethe Marie Santiago	Daraga	Binibining Pilipinas Supranational 2014	Miss Supranational 2014 Top 20
2011	Roxanne Joy Jesalva	Daraga	Binibining Pilipinas 2012 candidate	
2010	Katherine Dominique Lagrimas	Iriga	Miss Philippines Earth 2013 candidate Mutya ng Pilipinas 2009 Top 12	
2009	Patrixia Shirley Santos	Daraga	Miss Philippines Earth 2014 candidate Binibining Pilipinas 2010 candidateMiss Philippines Earth-Air 2022	
2008	Melody Gersbach	Daraga	Binibining Pilipinas International 2009	Miss International 2009 Top 15
2007	Tabetha Jo Frick	Pasacao	Binibining Pilipinas 2008 Top 10	
2006	Yuzilyn Shimizu	San Pascual		
2005	Jeanne Lindy Silo	Daraga		
2004	Maria Sarah Gacer	Tiwi		
2003	Aprille Maninang	Iriga		
2002	Angeline Tucio	Iriga	Binibining Pilipinas 2007 Top 13; Mutya ng Pilipinas 2003 1st runner-up	
2001	Cristina Tanya Ludovice	Daraga		
2000	Kathrina Fajardo	Naga		
1999				
1998	Dianne Marie Sandico	Legazpi		
1997	Joan Acabado	Iriga		
1996	Jennifer Nagrampa	Libmanan		
1995	Janet Johnson	Iriga City		
1994	Farrah Moll	Naga City		
1993				
1992	Aya Sunga	Masbate		
1991				
1990	Abegail Abad	Mercedes		
1989	Liezl Rabino	Masbate		
1988				
1987	Charito Vizcaya,	Daet		
1986	Brendalene Arroyo	Iriga		
1985	Ma. Isabel Barrameda	Naga		
1984	Minette Silva-Netto	Naga		
1983	Bettina Bonnevie Obias	Partido		
1982	Lilibeth Agnas-Sumayo			

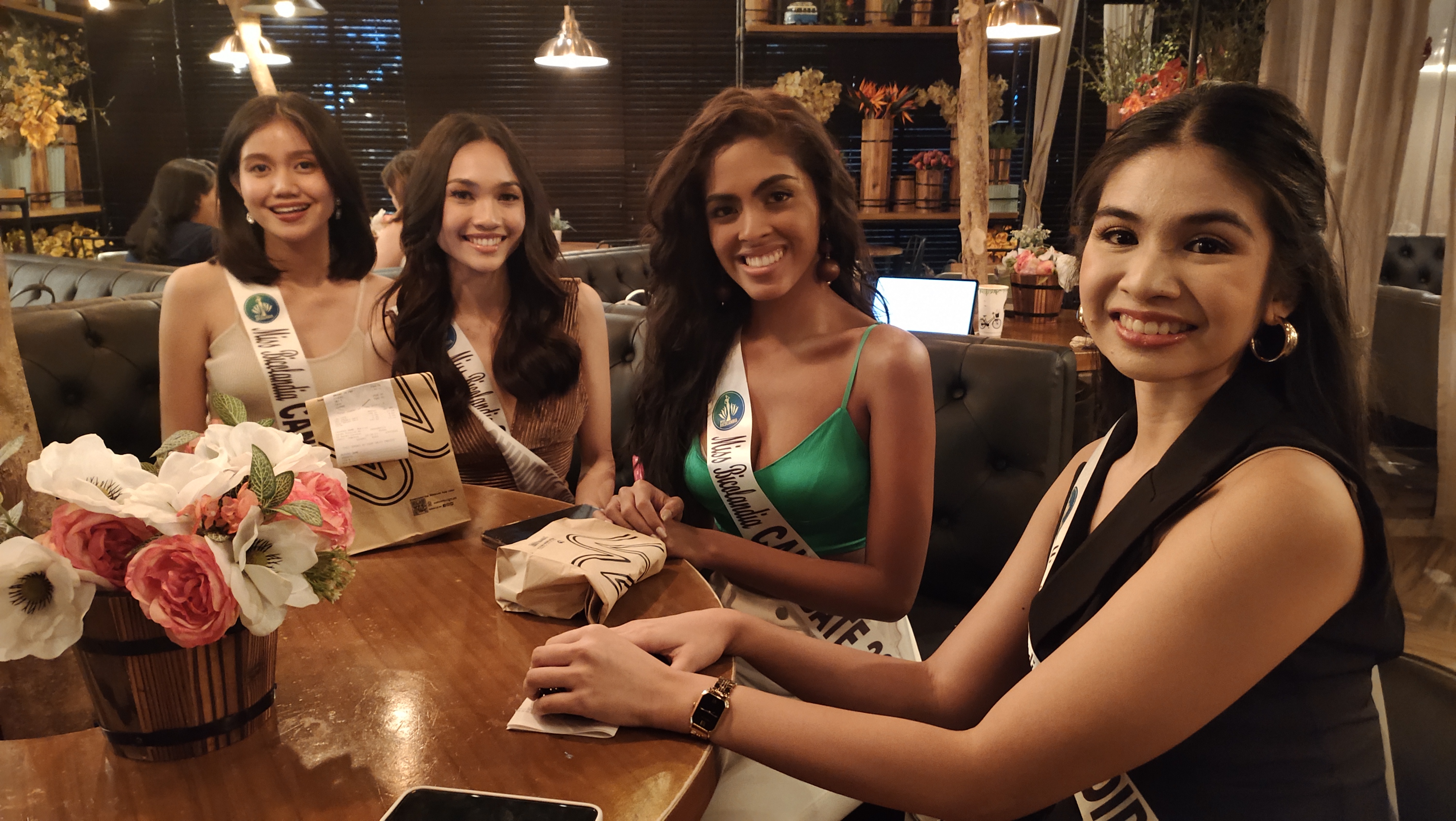
Miss Bicolandia 2022 candidates at Coffee Project in Naga City
