= Mutya ng Pilipinas 2007 =

- Date: 22 June 2007
- Venue: Subic Bay, Zambales, Philippines
- Entrants: 30
- Placements: 15
- Winner: Zephora Mayon; Las Piñas
- Congeniality: Christine Ramos Sienicki; Chicago
- Photogenic: Tanya Louise Loliquino Hendy; Australia

Mutya ng Pilipinas 2007, the 39th edition of Mutya ng Pilipinas, Inc., was held on June 22, 2007 in Subic Bay, Zambales. Zephora Mayon, the winner of Mutya ng Pilipinas Asia Pacific Int'l (Intercontinental) 2007 and Ana Marie Morelos named as Mutya ng Pilipinas Tourism International 2007.

== Results ==
=== Placements ===
Color keys

- The contestant was a Runner-up in an International pageant.

Placement	Contestant	International Placement
Mutya ng Pilipinas Asia Pacific International 2007	Las Piñas – Zephora Aldana Mayon	Abdicated her title
Mutya ng Pilipinas Tourism International 2007	Valenzuela – Ana Marie Pulpulaan Morelos	4th Runner-Up – Miss Tourism Metropolitan International 2007
1st Runner-Up	Pasig – Iris Frances Lim Tan	
2nd Runner-Up	Quezon City – Ricamarie Anne Beltran Taylor	
3rd Runner-Up	San Fernando Valley – Jacquiline Charlebois Rodriguez	
Top 15	#2 Bulacan – Marian Michelle Talag Oblea; #18 Cebu City – Aimee Ramos Hall; #17 Olongapo – Angelee delos Reyes; #5 East Coast – Veronica Genoves Turla; #10 Quezon City – Sherlyn Gonzales; #25 Illinois – Christine Ramos Sienicki; #21 Australia – Tanya Louise Loliquino Hendy; #23 Pampanga – Kate Princess Galang Alimurong; #22 Caloocan Beatriz Laylay Arenal; #26 Norway – Maylinn Albeso Storbakken	

=== Special Title ===
Title	Contestant
Mutya ng Pilipinas Overseas Communities 2007	#29 San Fernando Valley – Jacquiline Charlebois Rodriguez

=== Special awards ===
Special Awards	#	Contestant
Subic Bay Body Beautiful	#21	Tanya Louise Loliquino Hendy, Filipino Community of Australia
Best in Philippine Terno	#2	Marian Michelle Talag Oblea, Bulacan
Star of the Night	#10	Sherlyn Ramos Gonzales, Quezon City
Model Discovery of the Year (Best in Evening Gown)	#9	Zephora Aldana Mayon, Las Piñas
Miss Congeniality	#25	Christine Ramos Sienicki, Filipino Community of Chicago, Illinois, USA
Miss Photogenic	#21	Tanya Louise Loliquino Hendy, Filipino Community of Australia
Style Icon (Mary Pauleen Salon Awardee)	#22	Beatriz Laylay Arenal, Caloocan
Miss Body Perfect (Best in Swimsuit)	#22	Beatriz Laylay Arenal, Caloocan
Miss Talent	#2	Marian Michelle Talag Oblea, Bulacan

== Contestants ==
No.	Contestant	Age	Height	Hometown
1	Shane Manalo Padamada	21	5'4"	San Diego
2	Marian Michelle Talag Oblea	20	5'5"	Bulacan
3	Ronalyn Pulatao Ofiana	20	5'5"	Ilocos Sur
4	Eunice Almalel Escarez	21	5'5"	Arizona
5	Veronica Genoves Turla	23	5'6.5"	East Coast
6	Ara Lorraine Suzara Solis	20	5'5"	Laguna
7	Cherry May Centena Barbo	20	5'5"	Iloilo
8	Maria Queenie Dano Guzman	18	5'5"	Caloocan
9	Zephora Aldana Mayon	18	5'5"	Las Piñas
10	Sherlyn Ramos Gonzales	19	5'5.5"	Quezon City
11	Istana Eula Olay Burgos	22	5'5"	Isabela
12	Monica Aranas Mendoza	19	5'5"	Quezon City
13	Anna Katrina Raquindin Bautista	25	5'5.5"	La Union
14	Ricamarie Anne Beltran Taylor	22	5'6"	Quezon City
15	Christine Banies Mayon	21	5'6.5"	Batangas
16	Irene Rose Pernia Santos	23	5'6.5"	Pasig
17	Angelee Claudett Francisco delos Reyes	19	5'6.5"	Olongapo
18	Aimee Ramos Hall	23	5'6.5"	Cebu City
19	Iris Frances Lim Tan	21	5'6.5"	Pasig
20	Hannah Patricia Luna Panlaqui	20	5'6.5"	Laguna
21	Tanya Louise Loliquino Hendy	21	5'5"	Australia
22	Beatriz Laylay Arenal	18	5'7"	Caloocan
23	Kate Princess Galang Alimurong	19	5'7"	Pampanga
24	Ana Marie Pulpulaan Morelos	17	5'6"	Valenzuela
25	Christine Ramos Sienicki	25	5'7"	Chicago
26	Maylinn Albeso Storbakken	18	5'7"	Norway
27	Mary Jane delos Santos dela Cruz	21	5'7"	Bulacan
28	Emmalen Ortillo Horner	25	5'7.5"	Germany
29	Jacquiline Charlebois Rodriguez	17	5'9"	San Fernando Valley
30	Melissa Ann Letargo Escobar	23	5'9"	Canada

== Crossovers from Major National Pageants prior to this date ==
- Mutya #11 Istana Eula Olay Burgos was Miss Philippines Earth 2005 candidate
- Mutya #13 Anna Katrina Raquindin Bautista was Miss Philippines Earth 2007 Miss Eco-Tourism / 4th runner-up
- Mutya #14 Ricamarie Anne Beltran Taylor was Binibining Pilipinas 2005 Top 11 semifinalist and Binibining Pilipinas 2007 candidate
- Mutya #27 Mary Jane delos Santos dela Cruz was Binibining Pilipinas 2005 candidate
- Mutya #17 Angelee delos Reyes is Miss Philippines Earth 2013
