= Mutya ng Pilipinas 2006 =

- Date: June 9, 2006
- Venue: Manila
- Entrants: 24
- Placements: 10
- Winner: Kirby Ann Basken; Norway

Mutya ng Pilipinas 2006 was the 38th Mutya ng Pilipinas pageant, held in Manila, on June 9, 2006.

Kirby Ann Basken was named the winner of Mutya ng Pilipinas Asia Pacific Int'l (Intercontinental) 2006, and Vera Eumee Reiter named as Mutya ng Pilipinas Tourism International 2007.

== Results ==
=== Placements ===
Color keys

- The contestant was a Semifinalist in an International pageant.
- The contestant did not place.

Placement	Contestant	International Placement
Mutya ng Pilipinas Asia Pacific International 2006	Norway – Kirby Ann Basken (Appointed – Mutya ng Pilipinas Intercontinental 2006)	Top 12 – Miss Intercontinental 2006
Mutya ng Pilipinas Tourism International 2006	Quezon City – Vera Eumee delos Santos Reiter	Unplaced
1st Runner-Up	Taguig – Patricia Isabel Fernandez	
2nd Runner-Up	Manila – April Love Jordan	
3rd Runner-Up	Quezon City – Lorraine Erum	
Top 10		

=== Special Title ===
Title	Contestant
Mutya ng Pilipinas Overseas Communities 2006	#20 Canada – Christine Adela Ordañez White

=== Special awards ===
Award	Contestant
Miss Photogenic	#3 Quezon City – Vera Eumee delos Santos Reiter
Calayan Best Skin Award	#23 Norway – Kirby Ann Basken
Best in Swimsuit	#9 Taguig – Patricia Fernandez
Stress Free Beauty	#9 Taguig – Patricia Fernandez
Miss PIHA	#23 Norway – Kirby Ann Basken
Miss Friendship	#14 Quezon City – Lorraine Orpilla Erum
Miss Talent	#18 Batangas – Finky Reyes Carandang
Best in Evening Gown	#23 Norway – Kirby Ann Basken
Best Complexion and Hair	#23 Norway – Kirby Ann Basken
Best Designer	#12 Pampanga – Tata Galias (designer); Emily Arrozal Maningas

== Contestants ==
No.	Contestant	Age	Hometown
1	Joemel Moog de Guzman	18	Batangas
2	Rare Claudette Baliquig Navarro	19	Laguna
3	Vera Eumee delos Santos Reiter	18	Quezon City
4	Michelle Alcachupas Villadiego	18	Laguna
5	Monica Fernando Konig	19	Germany
6	Maria Jerese Guadiz dela Cruz	20	Dagupan
7	Grace Tibay Zamora	20	Iloilo
8	Jennifer Camacho		Baguio
9	Patricia Isabel Fernandez	20	Taguig
10	Amena Kop	25	Manila
11	Shanae Elaine Romano Haw	22	Southern California
12	Emily Arrozal Maningas	22	Pampanga
13	Sheena Kay Guevarra Perez	21	Legazpi
14	Lorraine Orpilla Erum	18	Quezon City
15	Diana May Malapitan Tejero	18	Manila
16	Unica Emnas Casacop	18	Laguna
17	Lothyssia Toribio van Heddegem	18	Bulacan
18	Finky Reyes Carandang	23	Batangas
19	Christie Ronaele Wakay Lingon	20	Manila
20	Christine Adela Ordañez White	21	Canada
21	Monica Cajucom Cervantes	19	Northeast Coast
22	April Love Antolo Jordan	18	Manila
23	Kirby Ann Tan Basken	20	Norway
24	Honey Jeanne Serazon Conde	19	Laguna

== Crossovers from major national pageants prior to this date ==
- Mutya #3 Vera Eumee Reiter was Binibining Pilipinas 2006 candidate
- Mutya #22 April Love Jordan was Miss Philippines Earth 2006 Top 10 semifinalist
