= Mutya ng Pilipinas 2001 =

- Date: June 9, 2001
- Presenters: Dingdong Dantes; Hans Montenegro
- Venue: NBC Tent, Taguig, Metro Manila, Philippines
- Broadcaster: GMA Network
- Entrants: 25
- Placements: 10
- Winner: Darlene Carbungco; Angeles

Mutya ng Pilipinas 2001 was the 33rd edition of Mutya ng Pilipinas. It was held at the now closed NBC Tent in Taguig, Metro Manila on June 9, 2001.

At the end of the event, Josephine Canonizado crowned Darlene Carbungco as Mutya ng Pilipinas Asia Pacific 2001. Including her crowned are the new court of winners: Michelle Ann Peñez was named First Runner-Up, Mimilannie Lisondra was named Second Runner-Up, Liza Diño was named Third Runner-Up, and Janice Gay Alop was named Fourth Runner-Up.

== Results ==
=== Placements ===
Color keys

- The contestant was a Runner-up in an International pageant.
- The contestant was not able to compete in an International pageant.
- The contestant did not place.

Placement	Contestant	International placement
Mutya ng Pilipinas Asia Pacific 2001	Mutya #25 – Darlene Carbungco	4th runner-up – Miss Asia Pacific 2001
1st runner-up	Mutya #1 – Michelle Ann Peñez (Later became Mutya ng Pilipinas Tourism Universe 2001)	1st runner-up – Miss Tourism Universe 2001
2nd runner-up	Mutya #7 – Mimilannie Lisondra (Later became Mutya ng Pilipinas Tourism Queen of the Year International 2001)	Unable to fulfill her competition
3rd runner-up	Mutya #18 – Mary Liza Diño (Later became Mutya ng Pilipinas Tourism International 2001)	Unplaced – Miss Tourism International 2001
4th runner-up	Mutya #21 – Janice Gay Alop	
Top 10	Mutya #2 – Nuriza Garcia Abeja Jr.; Mutya #4 – Sandra A. Rebancos; Mutya #5 – Athena Claveria; Mutya #13 – Mary Jane Isip; Mutya #20 – Anna Liza Bernal	

=== Special awards ===
Award	Contestant
Miss Photogenic	Mutya #8 - Hazel Gamilla
Miss Friendship	Mutya #12 - Girlie Gesta
Miss Talent	Mutya #9 - Jackie Garcia
Best in Swimsuit	Mutya #25 - Darlene Carbungco
Best in Long Gown	Mutya #11 - Alta Redor
Miss Avon	Mutya #25 - Darlene Carbungco
Miss Pond's Beautiful Skin	Mutya #5 - Athena Claveria
Miss Cremesilk Beautiful Hair	Mutya #18 - Liza Diño
Miss Close-Up Smile	Mutya #1 - Michelle Ann Peñez
Miss Lux Super Rich Star of the Night	Mutya #25 - Darlene Carbungco

== Contestants ==
Twenty-five contestants competed for the title.

No.	Contestant	Age	Hometown
1	Michelle Ann Peñez	19	California
2	Nuriza Garcia Abeja Jr.	23	Quezon City
3	Rosemarie Cepida	19	Iloilo City
4	Sandra A. Rebancos	22	Kalinga
5	Athena Claveria	23	Quezon City
6	Aireen Enquito	22	Mandaluyong
7	Mimilannie Lisondra	20	Bacolod
8	Hazel Gamilla	18	Santa Rosa
9	Jackie Garcia	19	Cebu City
10	Juneth Nitro	20	Santa Cruz
11	Alta Redor	20	Pasig
12	Girlie Gesta	19	Davao City
13	Mary Jane Isip	18	Manila
14	Evangeline Abadam	23	Olongapo
15	Maria Celine Carpeña	19	Taguig
16	Gemma Grace Auxterio	19	Tagum
17	Joan Vasquez	24	Parañaque
18	Mary Liza Bautista Diño	19	Marikina
19	Carla Paz Miller	24	Davao City
20	Anna Liza Bernal	20	Lipa
21	Janice Gay Alop	23	Olongapo
22	Abigail Abalos	18	London
23	Cathrina Magbanua	21	Muntinlupa
24	Chopen Albances	20	Cavite City
25	Darlene Zimmer Carbungco	20	Angeles

== Notes ==
=== Crossovers ===
- Mutya #2 Nuriza Abeja Jr. was a semifinalist at Binibining Pilipinas 2002.
- Mutya #4 Sandra Rebancos was a candidate at Binibining Pilipinas 2002.
- Mutya #5 Athena Claveria was a candidate at Binibining Pilipinas 2002.
- Mutya #20 Anna Liza Bernal was a semifinalist at Binibining Pilipinas 2000.

=== Post-pageant notes ===
- Mutya ng Pilipinas Asia Pacific, Darlene Carbungco competed at Miss Asia Pacific 2001 in Makati, Philippines and placed 4th runner-up.
- Mutya 1st runner-up, Michelle Ann Peñez competed at Miss Tourism Universe 2001 and placed 1st runner-up
- Mutya 2nd runner-up, Mimilannie Lisondra did not compete at Miss Intercontinental 2001 pageant
- Mutya third runner-up, Mary Liza Diño competed at Miss Tourism International 2001-2002 in Malaysia but unplaced
