= Mutya ng Pilipinas 2014 =

- Date: 8 August 2014
- Presenters: Christian Bautista; Bela Padilla; Kristine Caballero Aplal
- Venue: Solaire Casino and Resort, Parañaque, Metro Manila, Philippines
- Broadcaster: GMA Network
- Entrants: 30
- Placements: 10
- Winner: Eva Patalinjug; Cebu City
- Congeniality: Pauline Edralin; Melbourne
- Photogenic: Dorina Doerr; Tagbilaran

Mutya ng Pilipinas 2014 was the 46th Mutya ng Pilipinas pageant, held at the Solaire Resort and Casino in Parañaque, Metro Manila, Philippines, on August 8, 2014.

At the end of the event, Koreen Medina crowned Eva Psychee Patalinjug as Mutya ng Pilipinas Asia Pacific International 2014, Angeli Dione Gomez crowned Glennifer Perido as Mutya ng Pilipinas Tourism International 2014, and Asdis Lisa Karlsdottir crowned Patrizia Bosco as Mutya ng Pilipinas Overseas Communities 2014. Cristine Racel was named First Runner-Up, while Kim Fyfe was named Second Runner-Up.

== Results ==
=== Placements ===
Color keys

- The contestant was a Runner-Up in an International pageant.
- The contestant was not able to compete in an International pageant.

Placement	Contestant	International placement
Mutya ng Pilipinas Asia Pacific International 2014	#22 – Eva Psycee Patalinjug	No pageant held
Mutya ng Pilipinas Tourism International 2014	#26 – Glennifer Duggay Perido	2nd Runner-Up – Miss Tourism International 2014
1st Runner-Up	#9 – Christine Cheeny Racel	
2nd Runner-Up	#21 – Kim Fyfe	
Top 10	#2 – Dorina Doerr; #4 – Maria Jackelyn Dulay; #7 – Alexandra Faith Garcia; #16 – Christina De Vries; #25 – Patrizia Lucia Bosco; #29 – Pauline Edralin	

=== Special Title ===
Title	Contestant
Mutya ng Pilipinas Overseas Communities	# 25 Milan, Italy – Patrizia Lucia Bosco

=== Special Awards I ===
Special Awards	Mutya No.	Contestant	Represented
Mutya Darling of the Press	25	Patrizia Bosco	Milan
Mutya ng Sheridan	25	Patrizia Bosco	Milan
Mutya Miss Lee Cooper Jeans & I Am Confidence award	25	Patrizia Bosco	Milan
Mutya Photogenic	2	Dorina Doerr	Tagbilaran
Mutya Maybelline	2	Dorina Doerr	Tagbilaran
Mutya First Standard Finance Corp	2	Dorina Doerr	Tagbilaran
Mutya ng Informatics	2	Dorina Doerr	Tagbilaran
Mutya Best in Swimsuit	22	Eva Psychee Patalinjug	Cebu City
Mutya Best in Long Gown	26	Glennifer Perido	Cordilleras
Mutya Miss Rain or Shine	26	Glennifer Perido	Cordilleras
Mutya Zen Institute	26	Glennifer Perido	Cordilleras
Mutya Ivana Fragrance by Tupperware brand) awardee	26	Glennifer Perido	Cordilleras
Mutya People's Choice Awardee	16	Christina De Vries	Toronto
Mutya Best in Talent	6	Nickah dela Cruz	Bulacan
Mutya Best in Casual Dress	22	Eva Psychee Patalinjug	Cebu City
Mutya Tourism	4	Maria Jackielyn Dulay	Nueva Ecija
Mutya ng Hotel H2O	4	Maria Jackielyn Dulay	Nueva Ecija
Mutya Miss Fisher Dept Store	4	Maria Jackielyn Dulay	Nueva Ecija
Mutya Friendship	29	Pauline Edralin	Melbourne
Mutya Miss White Result Tupperware Brand awardee	7	Alexandra Faith Garcia	Zambales
Mutya ng Solaire	22	Eva Psychee Patalinjug	Cebu City
Mutya ng Sheridan	22	Eva Psychee Patalinjug	Cebu City
Mutya ng Viva Discovery	22	Eva Psychee Patalinjug	Cebu City
Mutya Skyjet Airlines	18	Cheryl Chen	Tarlac
Mutya Miss Fisher Mall	20	Candy Cumayas	Bohol
Mutya ng Biocera	21	Kim Fyfe	Australia

=== Special Awards II ===
5 Winners for the Designers Competition:	Designer	Mutya No.	Contestant	Representing
1.	Albert Andrada	16	Christina De Vries	Toronto
2.	M. Dumag	12	Shanice Aquino	Central Luzon
3.	Phillip Tampus (WINNER)	22	Eva Psychee Patalinjug	Cebu City
4.	Mr. Yap	9	Cristine Racel	Olongapo City
5.		30	Aiko Rachelle Caraan	Talisay City, Cebu

== Contestants ==
30 contestants competed for the two titles.

No.	Name	Age	Height	Hometown	Area Screened
1	Anna Margarette Bascon	21	5'5"	Lapu-Lapu	Cebu City
2	Dorina Doerr	20	5'6"	Tagbilaran	Cebu City
3	Britt Roselyn Rekkedal	22	5'6"	Scandinavia	Oslo, Norway
4	Maria Jackielyn Dulay	18	5'6"	Nueva Ecija	Angeles
5	Aivy Mae Castro	20	5'5.5"	Daanbantayan	Cebu City
6	Nickah Dela Cruz	24	5'6"	Bulacan	Manila
7	Alexandra Faith Garcia	20	5'6"	Zambales	Angeles
8	Renalyn Arinque	20	5'6"	Capiz	Iloilo City
9	Cristine Cheeny Racel	22	5'6.5"	Olongapo	Zambales
10	Kellie Dione Camoro	18	5'7"	Zamboanga City	Zamboanga City
11	Beatrice Kathryn Andrada	22	5'8"	Canada	Canada
12	Shanice Aquino	19	5'8.5"	Central Luzon	Angeles City
13	Annalita Vizcarra	19	5'6"	Murcia	Manila
14	Mary Ryelle Espiritu	18	5'8"	Arizona	Arizona, USA
15	Deborah Humpfner	22	5'8"	Germany	Germany
16	Christina De Vries	20	5'9"	Toronto	Toronto, Canada
17	Maria Leslie Angelina Ghan	21	5'8"	Misamis Oriental	Cagayan de Oro
18	Cheryl Chen	20	5'8"	Tarlac	Manila
19	Yesley Cabanos	18	5'8"	Caloocan	Manila
20	Candy Cumayas	19	5'8"	Bohol	Cebu City
21	Kim Fyfe	19	5'8"	Australia	Australia
22	Eva Psychee Patalinjug	20	5'7.5"	Cebu City	Cebu City
23	Rosalie Arcenio	18	5'7"	Aklan	Iloilo City
24	Froilene Villanueva	21	5'6.5"	Iloilo City	Iloilo City
25	Patrizia Lucia Bosco	20	5'6"	Milan	Italy
26	Gleniffer Perido	24	5'6"	Cordillera	Manila
27	Angela Aninang	21	5'6"	Mabalacat	Angeles City
28	Jovilyn Gavan	18	5'6"	Davao City	Davao City
29	Pauline Edralin	22	5'5"	Melbourne	Melbourne, Australia
30	Aiko Rachelle Caraan	21	5'6"	Talisay	Cebu City

^1*The Official Delegates were screened/auditioned at an open casting at various cities in the country and abroad.

== Crossovers from Major National Pageants prior to this date ==
- Mutya #9 Cristine Racel of Olongapo City was Slimmers World Miss Bikini Philippines 2013 1st runner-up
- Mutya #16 Christina De Vries of Toronto, Canada was Miss United Continents 2013 Philippine representative
- Mutya #26 Glennifer Perido of the Cordilleras was Binibining Pilipinas 2011 candidate and Miss Philippines Earth 2012 Miss Air / 1st runner-up
