= Mutya ng Pilipinas 2004 =

- Date: July 7, 2004
- Venue: Manila
- Broadcaster: ABC
- Entrants: 38
- Placements: 15
- Withdrawals: 2
- Winner: Jedah Hernandez; Laguna

Mutya ng Pilipinas 2004, the 36th edition of Mutya ng Pilipinas, Inc., was held on July 7, 2004 in Manila. Jedah Hernandez, came out victorious as the winner of Mutya ng Pilipinas Asia Pacific International 2004. The pageant was made into a reality TV-type of competition wherein the candidates is eliminated gradually until the finals. Known for its innovation and trendsetting TV formats, ABC 5 has launched "Buhay Beauty Queen: The Search for Mutya ng Pilipinas 2004". Wherein all contestants undergo a 14-week training under the tutelage of well-known trainers and beauty experts. The winner receives 1 million pesos and will represent at Miss Asia Pacific International pageant.

== Results ==
=== Placements ===
Placement	Candidate
Mutya ng Pilipinas 2004	Laguna – Jedah Casabuela Hernandez
1st Runner-Up	Rizal – Eizza Rancesca Santos Lim
2nd Runner-Up	Northern California – Carmelle Olivia Hebron
3rd Runner-Up	Las Piñas – Diana Jean Espidido
4th Runner-Up	Samar – Raichelle Mae Pacquiao
Top 15	#6 Makati – Tanya Yuquimpo; #7 Pangasinan – Maria Vanessa Mae Untalan; #16 Davao Oriental – Jessle Cristilyn Morales; #23 Davao City – Johanne Guirgen; #24 Caloocan – Maria Teresa Reyes; #35 Dumaguete – Blanche Marie Brown; #36 Canada – Joyce Tiffany San Antonio; #37 Southern California – Hannah Portia dela Vega; #38 Hawaii – Yasmin Arther Dar; #39 Pennsylvania – Kerry Acteson

=== Special awards ===
Special awards	#	Contestant
Miss Talent	#23	Johanne Guirgen, Davao City
Miss Photogenic	#35	Blanche Marie Brown, Dumaguete
Best in Swimsuit	#40	Carmelle Olivia Hebron, Filipino Community of Northern California, United States
Miss Congeniality	#10	Wendy Minion, Davao City
Best in Long Gown	#5	Diana Jean Espidido, Las Piñas (Metro Manila)
Miss Pinnacle	#23	Johanne Guirgen, Davao City

== Contestants ==
40 contestants competed for the title.

No.	Contestant
1	Eizza Rancesca Lim
2	Anne Kristin Bachmann
3	Dyan Jaret Delfin
4	Kooky Ken dela Cruz
5	Diana Jean Espidido
6	Maria Vanessa Mae Untalan
7	Tanya Yuquimpo
8	Mary Grace Layug
9	Jedah Hernandez
10	Wendy Minion
11	Hanika Marie Yuzon
12	Maria Liwayway Baterna
13	Annalou Grantusa
14	Aubrey Pilapil
15	Tia Maria Cordero
16	Jessle Cristilyn Morales
17	Maria Micaela Padilla
18	Anna Karenina Lopez
19	Snooky Anne Sanchez
20	Jaymee Topacio
21	Rhodalyn Macabuhay
22	Maria Leonila Papa
23	Johanne Guirgen
24	Maria Teresa Reyes
25	Michelle Bejer
26	Addaline Masigla
27	Mae Kristine Uy
28	Gracel Ann Salangsang
29	Kristine Zamora
30	Raichelle Mae Pacquiao
31	Miranda Marjon
32	Ira Lynn Johnson
33	Abigail Anne Obrero
34	Asia Laurel
35	Blanche Marie Brown
36	Joyce Tiffany San Antonio
37	Hannah Portia dela Vega
38	Yasmin Ather Dar
39	Kerry Acteson
40	Carmelle Olivia Hebron

== Crossovers and repeaters from major national pageants prior to this date ==
- Mutya #4 Kooky Ken dela Cruz was Binibining Pilipinas 2004 candidate
- Mutya #12 Maria Liwayway Baterna was Mutya ng Pilipinas 2003 Top 10 semifinalist and Binibining Pilipinas 2004 Top 10 semifinalist
