= Mutya ng Pilipinas 2026 =

55th edition of Mutya ng Pilipinas competition

- Date: October 14, 2026
- Presenters: Pauline Amelinckx; Tim Yap; Ganiel Krishnan; Maria Andrea Endicio
- Venue: Playtime Filoil Centre, San Juan, Metro Manila, Philippines
- Broadcaster: Facebook Live; IBC 13 (delayed telecast)
- Entrants: 37
- Placements: 21

Mutya ng Pilipinas 2026 was the 55th Mutya ng Pilipinas pageant held at the Playtime Filoil Centre in San Juan, Metro Manila, Philippines on October 14, 2026.

Christina Vanhefflin of Leyte crowned Josiela Lagrimas of Laoang, Northern Samar as her successor at the end of the event. Lagrimas will represent the Philippines at the Miss Intercontinental 2026 pageant.

== Results ==
=== Placements ===
Placement	Contestant	International Placement
Mutya ng Pilipinas - Miss Intercontinental 2026	Laoang, Northern Samar – Josiela Lagrimas	
Mutya ng Pilipinas - Top Model of the World 2026	California – Ciely Ann Ycoy	
Mutya ng Pilipinas - World Top Model 2026	Parañaque City – Lisa Marie Jane Craven	
Mutya ng Pilipinas - Miss Polo Universe 2027	Tacloban City – Jessica Deladia	
Mutya ng Pilipinas - Miss Global Universe 2027	Davao del Norte – Lyra Punsalan	
Mutya ng Pilipinas - Charity 2026	Camarines Sur – Iris Oresca	
Mutya ng Pilipinas - Overseas Communities 2026	United Arab Emirates – Natalie Jewelle Reyes	
Mutya ng Pilipinas - Luzon 2026	Pampanga – Maureen Mungcal	
Mutya ng Pilipinas - Visayas 2026	Cebu City – Patricia Dueñas	
Mutya ng Pilipinas - Mindanao 2026	Pangasinan – Claire Cacal ᚾ§	
Top 21	Camarines Norte – Rica Mae Villasana ᚾ; Dolores, Taytay, Rizal – Gwen Cledera; Laguna – Yuki Mae Tamar; Las Navas, Northern Samar – Ashley Jorda; Muntinlupa City – Chelsea Arciaga; Nueva Ecija – Marinell Salvador; Oriental Mindoro – Angelica Evora; Rizal – Amara Salgado; Samar – Kisha Honey Panis; Santiago City, Isabela – Zakaree Zea Bouffard; Talisay City, Cebu – Angela McKinney	

§ – Voted in the Top 10 by viewers and was awarded as Miss People's Choice

ᚾ – Voted in the Top 21 by the viewers

=== Special awards ===
==== Major Awards ====
Award	Contestant
Best in Evening Gown	Laoang, Northern Samar – Josiela Lagrimas
Best in Swimsuit	California – Ciely Ann Ycoy
Best in National Costume	Pampanga – Maureen Mungcal
Best in Terno	California – Ciely Ann Ycoy
Miss Photogenic	Oriental Mindoro – Angelica Evora
Miss Friendsip	Canada – Rachell Henry
Miss Telegenic	Camarines Sur – Iris Oresca
Best in Talent	United Arab Emirates – Natalie Jewelle Reyes
Miss People's Choice	Pangasinan – Claire Cacal
Best Designer Award	Laoang, Northern Samar – Josiela Lagrimas (Designed by Ting Joco)

==== Sponsor Awards ====
Award		Contestant
Darling of the Press	1st Place	Cavite – Angela Andrist
Darling of the Press	2nd Place	Samar – Kisha Honey Panis
Mutya ng Aposento		Talisay City, Cebu – Angela Kristiana McKinney
Mutya Aristrocrat		Carcar City, Cebu – Alana Gibbs
Mutya ng Creative Pixel		Pampanga – Maureen Mungcal
Mutya ng CCP		Camarines Norte – Rica Mae Villasana
Mutya ng PCSO		Camarines Sur – Iris Oresca
Mutya ng CWC		Laoang, Northern Samar – Josiela Lagrimas
Mutya ng Island Elephant		Malabon City – Angelica Raci
Mutya ng Mira Le Fleur		Camarines Sur – Iris Oresca
Mutya ng Mister Freeze		Davao del Norte – Lyra Punsalan
Mutya ng Montesa Medical Group		Laoang, Northern Samar – Josiela Lagrimas
Mutya ng Peculiar Eyeware		Davao del Norte – Lyra Punsalan
Mutya ng Philippine Airlines		California – Ciely Ann Ycoy
Mutya ng Sysprotech		Pangasinan – Claire Cacal
Mutya ng Trendy Creation		Davao del Norte – Lyra Punsalan

== Contestants ==
Thirty-seven contestants competed for ten titles.

Representing	Contestant
Albay	Rani Lachmi Dado
Australia	Michaela Aguilar
Buhi, Camarines Sur	Nicole Peñaserada
California	Ciely Ann Ycoy
Camarines Norte	Rica Mae Villasana
Camarines Sur	Iris Oresca
Canada	Rachell Henry
Carcar City, Cebu	Alana Gibbs
Cavite	Angela Andrist
Cebu City	Patricia Dueñas
Davao del Norte	Lyra Punsalan
Dolores, Taytay, Rizal	Gwen Cledera
General Tinio, Nueva Ecija	Leigh Eisly Martin
General Trias City	Fionna Lisma
Iligan City	Faith Izzy Bengil
Ilocos Region	Giselle Villorente
Laguna	Yuki Mae Tamar
Laoang, Northern Samar	Josiela Lagrimas
Las Navas, Northern Samar	Ashley Jorda
Malabon City	Angelica Raci
Muntinlupa City	Chelsea Arciaga
Nueva Ecija	Marinell Salvador
Oriental Mindoro	Angelica Evora
Pampanga	Maureen Mungcal
Pangasinan	Claire Cacal
Parañaque City	Lisa Marie Jane Craven
Polomolok, South Cotabato	Kimberly Mae Hollera
Rizal	Amara Salgado
Rodriguez, Rizal	Julla Icy Ramirez
Samar	Kisha Honey Panis
San Dionisio, Parañaque City	Christine Austria
Santiago City, Isabela	Zakaree Zea Bouffard
Tacloban City	Jessica Deladia
Talisay City, Cebu	Angela Kristiana McKinney
Taytay, Rizal	Suyhen del Rosario
Tubungan, Iloilo	Lorraine Manguiat
United Arab Emirates	Natalie Jewelle Reyes
