= Mutya ng Pilipinas 2009 =

- Date: 9 August 2009
- Venue: Baler, Aurora, Philippines
- Broadcaster: TV5
- Entrants: 34
- Placements: 12
- Withdrawals: 2
- Winner: Jane Bañares; Legazpi
- Congeniality: Diane de Vera; Romblon
- Photogenic: Katherine Dominique Lagrimas; Camarines Sur

Mutya ng Pilipinas 2009, the 41st edition of Mutya ng Pilipinas, Inc., was held on Aug. 9th, 2009 in Baler, Aurora. Jane Bañares, the winner of Mutya ng Pilipinas International 2009 and Jacqueline Schubert named as Mutya ng Pilipinas Tourism (Aurora) 2009.

== Results ==
=== Placements ===
Color keys

- The contestant was not able to compete in an International pageant.
- The contestant did not place.

Placement	Contestant	International Placement
Mutya ng Pilipinas International 2009	Legazpi – Jane Riel Bañares	Unable to fulfill her competition
Mutya ng Pilipinas Tourism 2009	Northern Germany – Jacqueline Durano Schubert (Appointed – Mutya ng Pilipinas Intercontinental 2009)	Unplaced
1st runner-up	Canada – Samantha East	
2nd runner-up	Quezon City – Jennielyn Natividad	
Top 12	Aurora – Athena Imperial; Bulacan – Jenn-Roe Gubat; Camarines Sur – Katherine Dominique Lagrimas; Cebu City – Karen Nacario; East Coast – Renee Rosario McHugh; Manila – Mae Lanie Chan; Palawan – Jo-Ann Peria; Taytay – Mary Ann Buenaventura	

=== Special Title ===
Title	Contestant
Mutya ng Pilipinas Overseas Communities 2009	#10 Texas – Ana Baladad

=== Special awards ===
Award	Contestant
Aurora Star of the Night	#26 Northern Germany – Jacqueline Schubert
Photographer’s Choice	#22 East Coast – Renee Rosario McHugh
Best in Long Gown	#28 Legazpi – Jane Bañares
John Robert Powers Personality Award	#18 Aurora – Sheryl Guerrero
OPMB Web Choice Award	#14 Pangasinan – Agnes Santiago
Miss Photogenic	#3 Camarines Sur – Katherine Dominique Lagrimas
Best in Talent	#5 Quezon City – Katrina Lopez
Miss Friendship	#23 Romblon – Diane de Vera
Best in Swimsuit	#26 Northern Germany – Jacqueline Schubert
Best in Sabutan (Gown)	#26 Northern Germany – Jacqueline Schubert
Best Designer Award	#13 Palawan – Jo-Ann Peria

== Contestants ==
34 contestants competed for the two titles.

No.	Contestant	Hometown
1	Athena Imperial	Casiguran
2	Therese Anne Francesca Meelheib	Northern California
3	Katherine Dominique Lagrimas	Camarines Sur
4	Disayrey Sayat	Batangas City
5	Maria Katrina Lopez	Quezon City
6	Mary Grace Morala	Cotabato City
7	Melissa Paula Travora	Davao del Sur
8	Jennielyn Natividad	Quezon City
9	Jelyssa Madrid	Vancouver
10	Ana Baladad	Texas
11	Lovett Keziah Avenido	Cebu City
12	Mae Lanie Chan	Manila
13	Jo-Ann Peria	Palawan
14	Agnes Santiago	Pangasinan
15	Roselynn Solis	Tarlac
16	Lenny Gamboa	Pampanga
17	Abigaile Fausto	Navotas
18	Sheryl Rose Guerrereo	Aurora
19	Mary Ann Buenaventura	Taytay
20	Christina McGarry	Midwest
21	Karen Nacario	Cebu City
22	Renee Rosario McHugh	East Coast
23	Dianne de Vera	Romblon
24	Samantha East	Canada
25	Consolacion Timbol	Tarlac
26	Jacqueline Schubert	Germany
27	Jenn-Roe Gubat	Bulacan
28	Jane Bañares	Legazpi
29	Nadine Karla de Roxas	Tagaytay
30	Zsaharah Nor Mantawil	Davao City
31	Mary Lorraine de Guzman	Makati
32	Darlene Diña	Batangas
33	Withdrew	
34	Withdrew	
35	Pearlyn Hortelano	Cebu City
36	Nadine Halvorsen	Norway

=== Withdrawals ===
No.	Delegate	Hometown	Status
33	Deborah Humpfner	Germany	Withdrew
34	Hannah Pichay	Singapore	Withdrew

== Crossovers from Major National Pageants prior to this date ==
- None
