= Mutya ng Pilipinas 2000 =

- Date: May 13, 2000
- Presenters: Michelle Aldana, Calvin Millado
- Venue: AFP Theater, Quezon City
- Broadcaster: RPN
- Entrants: 25
- Placements: 10
- Winner: Josephine Nieves Canonizado; Mandaluyong

Mutya ng Pilipinas 2000 was the 32nd edition of Mutya ng Pilipinas. It was held at the AFP Theater in Camp Aguinaldo, Quezon City, Metro Manila on May 13, 2000.

At the end of the event, Ritchie Ocampo crowned Josephine Canonizado as Mutya ng Pilipinas Asia Pacific 2000. Including her crowned are the new court of winners: Marie Pearl Acas was named First Runner-Up, Christine Anne de Jesus was named Second Runner-Up, Peachy Manzano was named Third Runner-Up, and Macbeth Abuzo was named Fourth Runner-Up.

== Results ==
=== Placements ===
Color keys

- The contestant Won in an International pageant.
- The contestant was a Runner-up in an International pageant.
- The contestant was not able to compete in an International pageant.
- The contestant did not place.

Placement	Contestant	International placement
Mutya ng Pilipinas Asia Pacific 2000	Mutya #10 – Josephine Nieves Canonizado	Unplaced – Miss Asia Pacific 2000
1st runner-up	Mutya #4 – Marie Pearl C. Acas	Unable to fulfill her competition
2nd runner-up	Mutya #5 – Christine Anne de Jesus (Appointed as Mutya ng Pilipinas Tourism Queen of the Year International 2000)	1st runner-up – Miss Tourism Queen of the Year International 2000
3rd runner-up	Mutya #16 – Maria Esperanza Manzano (Appointed as Mutya ng Pilipinas Tourism International 2000)	Winner – Miss Tourism International 2000-2001
4th runner-up	Mutya #2 – Macbeth Maybituin Abuzo (Appointed as Queen of the Clubs International 2000)	4th runner-up – Queen of the Clubs International 2001
Top 10	Mutya #9 – Kristine Reyes Alzar; Mutya #18 – Janice U. Mendoza; Mutya #19 – Cheeryl Joy L. Pulmano; Mutya #22 – Maria Criselda P. Osorio; Mutya #23 – Eden C. Maderal	

== Contestants ==
Twenty-five contestants competed for the title.

No.	Contestant	Age	Hometown
1	Andrea L. Araneta	18	Baguio
2	Macbeth M. Abuzo	18	Quezon City
3	Fatima Doria	18	Northern Luzon
4	Marie Pearl C. Acas	23	Manila
5	Christine Anne de Jesus	19	Central Luzon
6	Noah G. Bobis	18	Quezon City
7	Emiline Diana Cruz	19	Canada
8	Katherine G. Cabrera	18	Quezon City
9	Kristine R. Alzar	19	Lipa
10	Josephine Canonizado	22	Mandaluyong
11	Maria Carla Rabelas	19	Legazpi
12	Rosa Blanca A. Chua	18	Cainta
13	Renelene P. Dimson	19	Iloilo City
14	Jenie S. Manuel	18	Makati
15	Cherrie Marie B. Amante	22	Cebu City
16	Maria Esperanza Corazon Manzano	24	Quezon City
17	Kimberly-Anne D. Gonzalez	18	Tacloban
18	Janice U. Mendoza	20	Caloocan
19	Cheeryl Joy L. Pulmano	19	Zamboanga City
20	Rowena O. Miranda	23	Taguig
21	Maria Criselda P. Osorio	21	Parañaque
22	Eden C. Maderal	23	Cagayan de Oro
23	Arlene Joy A. Paredes	18	Pasig
24	Vera M. Vergara	20	Davao City
25	Precylynn O. Pulbosa	21	Manila
