= Mutya ng Pilipinas 2005 =

- Date: June 11th, 2005
- Venue: Intramuros, Manila
- Entrants: 24
- Placements: 10
- Winner: Maria Carmeniezinas Maxilom Nicolosi; Fil-Com Italy

Mutya ng Pilipinas 2005, the 37th edition of Mutya ng Pilipinas, Inc., was held on June 11, 2005 in Intramuros, Manila. Maria Carmeniezinas Maxilom Nicolosi, came out victorious as the winner of Mutya ng Pilipinas Asia Pacific International 2005.

== Results ==
=== Placements ===
Placement	Contestant
Mutya ng Pilipinas Asia Pacific International 2005	Italy – Maria Carmeniezinas Maxilom Nicolosi
1st Runner-Up	Germany – Katharina Enocida Koegel
2nd Runner-Up	Pangasinan – Arabella Ordoñez
3rd Runner-Up	Quezon City – Abigail Grivas Cruz
4th Runner-Up	Ilocos Sur – Namkeen Soller Hameed
Top 10	#4 Zambales – Carmelle Bahalla Paguia; #5 Parañaque – Kathlyn Aguirre Valenzuela; #7 Quezon City – Hemilyn Flores Escudero; #22 Dumaguete – Liana Flores Basmayor; #24 Ilocos Norte – Rochelle Jane Duldulao Hagunos

=== Special awards ===
Special awards	#	Contestant
Miss Photogenic	#8	Katharina Enocida Koegel, Filipino Community of Germany
Kagandahan with Calayan Awardee	#8	Katharina Enocida Koegel, Filipino Community of Germany
Best in Swimsuit	#10	Maria Carmeniezinas Maxilom Nicolosi, Filipino Community of Italy
Miss Congeniality	#3	Annalie Uson Bonda, Filipino Community of California, Canada
Miss Talent	#9	Anija Isabel Jalac, Filipino Community of New Jersey, United States
Best in Evening Gown	#8	Katharina Enocida Koegel, Filipino Community of Germany
Best Designer	#20	Ronaldo Arnaldo (Designer); Elaine Marie Coyle, Filipino Community of London, United Kingdom

== Contestants ==
No.	Contestant	Age	Height	Hometown
1	Katherine Estrella Bernal	19	5'4"	New York
2	Shelly Wynne Manacsa	21	5'5"	California
3	Annalie Uson Bonda	20	5'4"	California
4	Carmelle Bahalla Paguia	21	5'4.5"	Zambales
5	Kathlyn Aguirre Valenzuela	21	5'4.5"	Parañaque
6	Paula Junne Yarra Ruiz	18	5'4.5"	Marikina
7	Hemilyn Flores Escudero	24	5'4.5"	Quezon City
8	Katharina Enocida Koegel	18	5'5.5"	Germany
9	Anija Isabel Jalac	22	5'4"	New Jersey
10	Maria Carmeniezinas Maxilom Nicolosi	21	5'6"	Italy
11	Namkeen Soller Hameed	19	5'5"	Ilocos Sur
12	Abigail Grivas Cruz	20	5'5"	Quezon City
13	Rose-Cel Cruz Aguilar	19	5'5.5"	Australia
14	Mary Candice Allapitan Ramos	18	5'7"	Isabela
15	Marevel Bautista Alcantara	18	5'5.5"	Batangas
16	Penelope Joy Gardiner Jacinto	18	5'6"	Legazpi
17	Lynelle Barredo Fariñas	19	5'6"	Zamboanga City
18	Elizabeth Jacqueline Santander Nacuspag	21	5'7"	Quezon City
19	Arabella Ordoñez Hanesh	18	5'6.5"	Pangasinan
20	Elaine Marie Coyle	21	5'7.5"	London
21	Windena Deocareza Zaragoza	18	5'7"	Camarines Sur
22	Liana Flores Basmayor	20	5'7"	Dumaguete
23	Christelle Mae Almazol Reyes	19	5'7.5"	Bulacan
24	Rochelle Jane Duldulao Hagunos	18	5'9"	Ilocos Norte

== Crossovers from major national pageants prior to this date ==
- None
