= Mutya ng Pilipinas 2025 =

53nd edition of Mutya ng Pilipinas competition

- Date: November 17, 2025
- Presenters: Pauline Amelinckx, Nico Locco, Ganiel Krishnan
- Venue: Playtime Filoil Centre, San Juan, Metro Manila, Philippines
- Broadcaster: Facebook Live
- Entrants: 32
- Placements: 21
- Winner: Christina Vanhefflin; Leyte
- Congeniality: Lillian Andrea Leiz Perez, Queensland, Australia
- Photogenic: Ma. Andrea Endicio, Candelaria, Quezon

Mutya ng Pilipinas 2025 was the 54th Mutya ng Pilipinas pageant held at the Playtime Filoil Centre in San Juan, Metro Manila, Philippines on November 17, 2025.

Alyssa Redondo of California crowned Christina Vanhefflin of Leyte as her successor at the end of the event. Vanhefflin represented the Philippines at the Miss Intercontinental 2025 pageant on 29 January 2026 and finished as 4th Runner-up.

== Background ==
=== Withdrawals ===
The 3rd of November 2025, was the final screening of the official candidates at the CWC Design Center in Makati, thirty-three ladies were chosen and one of them was Maria Raycel Pabelemia of Calapan, Oriental Mindoro. During the press presentation on the 7th of November at the Bellevue Hotel in Alabang, Muntinlupa City, Raycel was a no-show at the event.

At this final screening, Cory Quirino (President and National Director) also mentioned two delegates from Overseas Communities who were on the final list of candidates awaiting arrivals namely: Joy Fernando (Canada) and Angela Simmonds (Virginia, USA). The two were unaccounted for during the press presentation.

== Pre-Pageant Activities ==
The 7 November 2025 was the press presentation of delegates at the Bellevue Hotel in Alabang, Muntinlupa City.

On 11 November 2025, the candidates visited the Tuloy Foundation, home of the marginalized youths located at Don Bosco, Muntinlupa City.

On 14 November 2025, the preliminary Swimsuit and National Costume competitions held at the Galerie Aveline in Makati City.

== Results ==
=== Placements ===
Placement	Contestant	International Placement
Mutya ng Pilipinas Intercontinental 2025	Leyte – Christina Vanhefflin	4th Runner-up – Miss Intercontinental 2025
Mutya ng Pilipinas World Top Model 2025	Parañaque City – Naomi Raine Wainwright	TBA – World Top Model 2026
Mutya ng Pilipinas Tourism International 2025 (appointed as Miss Polo Universe Philippines 2026)	Candelaria, Quezon – Ma. Andrea Endicio	Winner – Miss Polo Universe 2026
Mutya ng Pilipinas Overseas Communities 2025	Melbourne, Australia – Mahalia Bangit	
Mutya ng Pilipinas Charity 2025	Makati City – Ali Honee Posuemalto §	
Mutya ng Pilipinas Luzon 2025 (appointed as Miss Global Universe Philippines 2026)	Mabini, Batangas – Lyndzy Blyss Maranan ᚾ	Winner – Miss Global Universe 2026
Mutya ng Pilipinas Visayas 2025 (appointed as Top Model of the World Philippines 2026)	San Pablo City – Eunice Deza	2nd Runner-up – Top Model of the World 2026
Mutya ng Pilipinas Mindanao 2025	Iligan City – Juliana Fresado	
Mutya ng Pilipinas Kultura (Culture) 2025	Pampanga – Glezette Garcia	
Top 21	Batangas – Joanne Valencia; California, USA – Reya Anne Mico; Antipolo City – Ma. Marries Nueva; Imus City – Julianne Reyes; Laguna – Polyanna Martina Manalo; Oriental Mindoro – Myrea Manely Caccam; Quezon – Amaryllis Flower Silva; South Cotabato – Glycelle Achurra Navares; Tacloban City – Erica Alliana De Meyer; Tanauan City – Jannah Rochelle Puno; Tuguegarao City – Mikaela Torino; Zambales – Keithrieann Denise Ramirez	

§ – Voted in the Top 21 by viewers and was awarded as Miss Popularity
ᚾ – Voted in the Top 21 by viewers and was awarded as Miss People's Choice

=== Special awards ===
==== Major Awards ====
Award	Contestant
Best Designer Award	Candelaria, Quezon – Ma. Andrea Endicio (Designed by Louis Pangilinan)
Best in Evening Gown	Candelaria, Quezon – Ma. Andrea Endicio
Best in Swimsuit	Candelaria, Quezon – Ma. Andrea Endicio
Miss Photogenic	Candelaria, Quezon – Ma. Andrea Endicio
Best in National Costume	Pampanga – Glezette Garcia
Best in Talent	Melbourne, Australia – Mahalia Bangit
Miss Congeniality	Queensland, Australia – Lillian Andrea Leiz Perez
Miss Telegenic	Imus City – Julianne Reyes
Miss Popularity	Makati City – Ali Honee Posuemalto
Miss People's Choice	Mabini, Batangas – Lyndzy Blyss Maranan

==== Sponsor Awards ====
Award	Contestant
Miss Bellevue	Candelaria, Quezon – Ma. Andrea Endicio
Miss Hongqi	Candelaria, Quezon – Ma. Andrea Endicio
Miss Mira Le Fleur	Candelaria, Quezon – Ma. Andrea Endicio
Miss Mr. Freeze Tube Ice Inc.	Candelaria, Quezon – Ma. Andrea Endicio
Miss Trendy Creation	Candelaria, Quezon – Ma. Andrea Endicio
Miss JM Pageantry Innovations	Leyte – Christina Vanhefflin
Miss Montesa Medical Group	Leyte – Christina Vanhefflin
Miss PAGCOR	Leyte – Christina Vanhefflin
Miss Rising Tigers Magazine	Leyte – Christina Vanhefflin
Miss Zolea Fitness	Leyte – Christina Vanhefflin
Miss Mestiza	Makati City – Ali Honee Posuemalto
Miss PCSO	Makati City – Ali Honee Posuemalto
Miss Sysprotech	Makati City – Ali Honee Posuemalto
Miss SQORS	Makati City – Ali Honee Posuemalto
Miss SQORS	Mabini, Batangas – Lyndzy Blyss Maranan
Miss Anna-E Gandang Powerful	Iligan City – Juliana Fresado
Miss Creative Pixel	Parañaque City – Naomi Riane Wainwright
Miss CWC	Imus City – Julianne Reyes
Miss Graze Yourself	Cabanatuan City – Vhana Patrish Hernandez

== Contestants ==
Thirty-two contestants competed for nine titles.

Contestant	Age	Representing
Ysa Camille Avellaneda	24	Aurora
Geraldine Buenafe	26	Batangas City
Joanne Valencia	26	Batangas
Vhana Patrish Hernandez	21	Cabanatuan City
Reya Anne Mico	26	California, USA
Ma. Andrea Endicio	25	Candelaria, Quezon
Ma. Marries Nueva	23	Antipolo City
Brooke Erin Barredo	23	Florida, USA
Roselyn May Bigaran	20	General Trias City
Juliana Fresado	20	Iligan City
Julianne Reyes	22	Imus City
Polyanna Martina Manalo	24	Laguna
Christina Vanhefflin	20	Leyte
Lyndzy Blyss Maranan	24	Mabini, Batangas
Ali Honee Posuemalto	28	Makati City
Mahalia Bangit	18	Melbourne, Australia
Luisa Antonette Butay	20	Muntinlupa City
Carmina Santina Valentino	25	New Zealand
Myrea Manely Caccam	24	Oriental Mindoro
Glezette Garcia	20	Pampanga
Pearline Joy Bayog	24	Pangasinan
Naomi Riane Wainwright	19	Parañaque City
Lillian Andrea Leiz Perez	20	Queensland, Australia
Amaryllis Flower Silva	23	Quezon
Eunice Deza	25	San Pablo City
Glycelle Navares	27	South Cotabato
Ma. Leslyn Nummila	23	Subic, Zambales
Erica Alliana De Meyer	18	Tacloban City
Jannah Rochelle Puno	23	Tanauan City
Mikylla Jed Garcia	21	Trece Martires City
Mikaela Torino	23	Tuguegarao City
Keithrieann Denise Ramirez	20	Zambales
