= Mutya ng Pilipinas 2024 =

53nd edition of Mutya ng Pilipinas competition

- Date: 6 September 2024
- Presenters: James Deakin; Pauline Amelinckx; Ganiel Krishnan
- Entertainment: OC-J; Khimo; KAIA
- Venue: Filoil EcoOil Centre, San Juan, Metro Manila, Philippines
- Broadcaster: ABS-CBN
- Entrants: 31
- Placements: 16
- Winner: Alyssa Redondo; California
- Congeniality: Joanna Rellosa, Valenzuela
- Photogenic: Jireh Mayani, Davao City

Mutya ng Pilipinas 2024 was the 53rd Mutya ng Pilipinas pageant, held at the Filoil EcoOil Centre in San Juan, Metro Manila, Philippines on September 6, 2024.

Iona Violeta Gibbs of Bataan crowned Alyssa Redondo of California as her successor at the end of the event. Redondo will represent the Philippines at the Miss Intercontinental 2024 pageant.

== Results ==
=== Placements ===
Placement	Contestant	International Placement
Mutya ng Pilipinas Intercontinental 2024	California – Alyssa Redondo	2nd Runner-up – Miss Intercontinenal 2024
Mutya ng Pilipinas World Top Model 2024	Pampanga – Anne Klein Castro	Unable to compete due to visa issues
Mutya ng Pilipinas Tourism International 2024	Batangas City – Liana Barrido	Winner – Miss Tourism International 2024
Mutya ng Pilipinas Environment International 2024	Canada – Arianna Pantaleon	Winner – Miss Environment International 2025
Mutya ng Pilipinas Overseas Communities 2024	Washington – Aiyen Maquiraya	
Mutya ng Pilipinas Charity 2024	Manila – Xena Ramos	4th Runner-up – Miss Global 2025
Mutya ng Pilipinas Luzon 2024	San Dionisio, Parañaque – Christine Eds Enero	1st Runner-up – Miss Tourism International 2025 (Miss Tourism Queen of the Year International 2025)
Mutya ng Pilipinas Visayas 2024	Pangasinan – Stacey de Ocampo	
Mutya ng Pilipinas Mindanao 2024	Davao City – Jireh Mayani	
Top 16	Abu Dhabi – Fredmariel Adan; Bulacan – Loraine Jara; Dubai – Elizah Mendoza; Laguna – Kathlen Kate Guio-Guio; Melbourne – Rozette Wozniak; Palawan – Glyzel Suyat; Zambales – Princess Juliane Opiaza	

Anne Klein Castro (Mutya ng Pilipinas - World Top Model 2024) was unable to compete at World Top Model 2024 due to visa issues. She was replaced by Megan Deen Campbell (Mutya ng Pilipinas Visayas 2022).

=== Special awards ===
Award	Contestant
Best in Evening Gown/Best Designer	California – Alyssa Redondo (Manny Halasan)

== Contestants ==
Thirty-one contestants competed for nine titles.

Locality	Contestant
Abu Dhabi	Fredmariel Adan
Antipolo	Bianca Lara
Aurora	Leahrly Curitana
Australia	Jacqueline Mangubat
Batangas City	Liana Barrido
Bulacan	Loraine Jara
Cabuyao	Angela Domagsang
California	Alyssa Redondo
Caloocan	Allaine Nuez
Camarines Sur	Clare Alexandra Azañes
Canada	Arianna Pantaleon
Cebu	Jennifer dela Cerna
Davao City	Jireh Mayani
Dubai	Elizah Mendoza
General Trias	Joyce Ann del Rosario
Laguna	Kathlen Kate Guio-Guio
Las Piñas	Felicia Aldana
Mabini, Batangas	Louise Bautista
Manila	Xena Ramos
Melbourne	Rozette Wozniak
New Zealand	Mikaela Alavar
Palawan	Glyzel Suyat
Pampanga	Anne Klein Castro
Pangasinan	Stacey de Ocampo
Parañaque	Jeanne Talania
San Dionisio, Parañaque	Christine Enero
South Caloocan	Chielo Mia Serrano
Talavera	Aeroz Rednaxela Ganiban
Valenzuela	Joanna Rellosa
Washington	Aiyen Maquiraya
Zambales	Princess Juliane Opiaza
