= Mutya ng Pilipinas 2022 =

52nd edition of Mutya ng Pilipinas competition

- Date: 4 December 2022
- Presenters: Marco Gumabao; Klyza Castro; Gretchen Fullido
- Entertainment: G22; Alamat; John Guelas
- Venue: Filoil EcoOil Centre, San Juan, Metro Manila, Philippines
- Broadcaster: FYE Channel; A2Z; ABS-CBN
- Entrants: 38
- Placements: 21
- Winner: Iona Violeta Gibbs; Bataan
- Photogenic: Zeah Nestle Pala; Tarlac

Mutya ng Pilipinas 2022 was the 52nd Mutya ng Pilipinas pageant, held at the Filoil EcoOil Centre in San Juan, Metro Manila, Philippines, on December 4, 2022.

At the end of the event, Klyza Castro crowned Iona Gibbs as Mutya ng Pilipinas Intercontinental 2022; Including her crowned are the new court of winners: Arianna Kyla Padrid was crowned as Mutya Pilipinas World Top Model 2022, Jeanette Reyes was crowned as Mutya ng Pilipinas Tourism International 2022, and Jesi Mae Cruz was crowned as Mutya ng Pilipinas Overseas Communities 2022. Shannon Robinson was named Mutya ng Pilipinas Luzon, Megan Deen Campbell as Mutya ng Pilipinas Visayas, and Marcelyn Bautista as Mutya ng Pilipinas Mindanao.

Anie Uson Chen was also crowned as Mutya ng Pilipinas Chinese World 2022. Uson was appointed from Mutya ng Pilipinas 2018, who was then part of the Top 12 semifinalists.

Three new titles were added to the roster for this edition: Miss Environment International and Miss Chinese World. This year, the Miss Intercontinental franchise is back at Mutya ng Pilipinas. after BPCI lost the franchise.

There was no national pageant held for the 2023 edition since all of the 2022 MNP winners competed their respective international pageants in 2023, except Arianna Kyla Padrid who competed the World Top Model on the 25th of February 2024.

== Results ==
=== Placements ===
Color keys

- The contestant won in an international pageant.
- The contestant was a Runner-Up in an International pageant.
- The contestant was a Semifinalist in an International pageant.

Placement	Contestant	International placement
Mutya ng Pilipinas 2022	Bataan – Iona Violeta Gibbs	Top 22 – Miss Intercontinental 2023
Mutya ng Pilipinas World Top Model 2022	Northern California – Arianna Kyla Padrid	1st Runner Up – World Top Model 2023
Mutya ng Pilipinas Tourism International 2022	Camarines Sur – Jeanette Reyes	Miss Tourism Metropolitan International 2023 (2nd Runner-Up) – Miss Tourism International 2023
Mutya ng Pilipinas Overseas Communities 2022	California – Jesi Mae Cruz	
Mutya ng Pilipinas Luzon 2022	Makati – Shannon Robinson	Winner – Miss Environment International 2023
Mutya ng Pilipinas Visayas 2022	Lapu-Lapu – Megan Deen Campbell	1st Runner Up – World Top Model 2024
Mutya ng Pilipinas Mindanao 2022	Tarlac City – Marcelyn Bautista	
Top 21	Batangas City – Charisse Abanico; Biliran – Shindell Atibula; Canada – Margaret Anne Rodrigo; Iloilo City – Joycee Lavida; Melbourne – Ilyssa Mendoza; Muntinlupa – Bea Margaretta Madea; Ormoc – Abiah Dicdican; Pampanga – Kyle Celine Laughead; Rizal – Ma. Flordeliz Mabao; Southern California – Priya Mundy; Surigao del Norte – Michelle Angela Okol; Tantangan – Jirah Bantas; Tarlac – Zeah Nestle Pala	

=== Appointed ===
Title	Delegate	International placement
Mutya ng Pilipinas Chinese World 2022	Pangasinan – Anie Uson Chen	Winner – Miss Chinese World 2023

=== Special awards ===
Award	Contestant
People's Choice	Rizal – Ma. Flordeliz Mabao
Miss Photogetic	Tarlac – Zeah Nestle Pala
Best in Evening Gown	Bataan – Iona Violeta Gibbs
Best in Swimsuit	California – Jesi Mae Cruz
Best in Terno	Camarines Sur – Jeanette Reyes
Best in Talent	Albay – Eloiza Lanuzga; Tantangan – Jirah Bantas
Miss CWC	Makati – Shannon Robinson
Miss Camera Club of the Philippines	Camarines Sur – Jeanette Reyes
Miss Ascott	Lapu-Lapu – Megan Deen Campbell
Miss Changan	Tarlac – Zeah Nestle Pala
Miss Ever Bilena	Bataan – Iona Violeta Gibbs
Miss Mestiza	Tarlac – Zeah Nestle Pala

== Contestants ==
38 contestants competed for seven titles.

Locality	Contestant	Age (Note: Ages at the time of the pageant)
Albay	Eloiza Lanuzga	
Bacolod	Eirine Granada	19
Bataan	Iona Gibbs	20
Batangas City	Charisse Abanico	23
Biliran	Shindell Atibula	18
Bohol	Angelli Mae Garcia	
Bulacan	Juvel Cyrene Bea	26
Cagayan de Oro	Arianne Galenzoga	
California	Jesi Mae Cruz	20
Caloocan	Carla Tobias	
Camarines Norte	Janine Ahmad	
Camarines Sur	Jeanette Reyes	
Canada	Margaret Rodrigo	
Catanduanes	Jessica Holz	28
Cavite	Rachel Olivo	
Cebu	McKate Dela Cruz	21
Concepcion	Erica Kyla Punsalan	22
Guindulman	Katherine Topsnik	20
Iloilo City	Joycee Lavida	27
Kidapawan	Precious Enriquez	
Lapu-Lapu	Megan Deen Campbell	24
Makati	Shannon Robinson	
Melbourne	Ilyssa Mendoza	
Mindoro	Mia Malabanan	
Muntinlupa	Bea Margarett Madea	19
Northern California	Arianna Kyla Padrid	20
Ormoc	Abiah Dicdican	
Pampanga	Kyle Celine Laughead	20
Parañaque	Karla Mae Casco	
Quezon	Anjeanette Japor	26
Quezon City	Breanna Macalinao	
Rizal	Flordeliz Mabao	25
Sorsogon	Jaya Jarabejo	
Southern California	Priya Mundy	26
Surigao del Norte	Michelle Angela Okol	22
Tantangan	Jirah Bantas	21
Tarlac	Zeah Nestle Pala	22
Tarlac City	Marcelyn Bautista	
