= Binibining Pilipinas 2002 =

Beauty pageant

- Date: March 16, 2002
- Presenters: Derek Ramsay; Miriam Quiambao; Charlene Gonzales
- Entertainment: Ogie Alcasid
- Venue: Araneta Coliseum, Quezon City, Philippines
- Broadcaster: GMA Network
- Entrants: 23
- Placements: 12
- Winner: Karen Loren Agustin; Manila
- Congeniality: Athena Claveria; Novaliches
- Photogenic: Margaret-Ann Bayot; Antipolo

Binibining Pilipinas 2002 was the 39th edition of Binibining Pilipinas. It took place at the Smart Araneta Coliseum in Quezon City, Metro Manila, Philippines on March 16, 2002.

At the end of the event Zorayda Ruth Andam crowned Karen Loren Agustin as Binibining Pilipinas Universe 2002, Gilrhea Quinzon crowned Katherine Ann Manalo as Binibining Pilipinas World 2002, while Maricarl Tolosa crowned Kristine Alzar as Binibining Pilipinas International 2002. Margaret-Ann Bayot was named First Runner-Up, while Maria Lourdes Magno was named Second Runner-Up. Later that year, Bayot competed in the Miss Internet WWW pageant and finished as second runner-up.

== Results ==
Color keys

- The contestant was a Runner-up in an International pageant.
- The contestant was a Semi-Finalist in an International pageant.
- The contestant did not place.

Placement	Contestant	International Placement
Binibining Pilipinas Universe 2002	Bb. #19 - Karen Loren Agustin	Unplaced – Miss Universe 2002
Binibining Pilipinas World 2002	Bb. #17 - Katherine Anne Manalo	Top 10 – Miss World 2002
Binibining Pilipinas International 2002	Bb. #5 - Kristine Alzar	Unplaced – Miss International 2002
1st Runner-Up	Bb. #15 - Margaret-Ann Bayot	2nd Runner-Up – Miss Internet WWW 2002
2nd Runner-Up	Bb. #20 - Maria Lourdes Magno	
Top 12	Bb. #4 - Lakambini Alto; Bb. #9 - Sherlyn Ram; Bb. #12 - Sherilene Parcon; Bb. #14 - Katherine Aban; Bb. #16 - Heidi Punsalan; Bb. #18 - Anna Teresita Lopez; Bb. #22 - Nuriza Abeja	

=== Special awards ===
Award	Contestant
Best in Swimsuit	Bb. #17 – Katherine Anne Manalo
Best in Evening Gown	Bb. #19 – Karen Loren Agustin
Miss Photogenic/AGFA	Bb. #15 – Margaret-Ann Bayot
Miss Friendship	Bb. #3 – Athena Claveria
Miss Talent	Bb. #8 – Sheila Margrethe Alonso
Miss Lux Super Rich Star of the Night	Bb. #19 – Karen Loren Agustin
Miss Creamsilk Beautiful Hair	Bb. #15 – Margaret-Ann Bayot
Miss Pond's Beautiful Skin	Bb. #9 – Sherlyn Ram
Miss Close-Up Smile	Bb. #17 – Katherine Anne Manalo
Miss Yehey Internet	Bb. #15 – Margaret-Ann Bayot
Binibining Avon	Bb. #17 – Katherine Anne Manalo
Miss PAL Sunniest Personality	Bb. #17 – Katherine Anne Manalo
Miss Red Bull Supreme Energy	Bb. #17 – Katherine Anne Manalo
Miss Myra 300-E	Bb. #17 – Katherine Anne Manalo

== Contestants ==
23 contestants competed for the three titles.

No.	Contestant	Age	Represented	Placement
1	Sandra Rebancos	23	Kalinga	
2	Melanie Abigail Capati	18	Valenzuela	
3	Athena Claveria	24	Novaliches, Quezon City	
4	Lakambini Alto	22	Pasig	Top 12
5	Kristine Alzar	20	Lipa, Batangas	Binibining Pilipinas International 2002
6	Kathleen Lloyd Cawan	19	Bacoor, Cavite	
7	Elaine Andes	21	Zamboanga City	
8	Sheila Margrethe Alonso	17	Negros Oriental	
9	Sherlyn Ram	20	Baguio	Top 12
10	Mary Hyacinth Zalamea	24	Angeles City	
11	Jazel Mañalac	19	Dinalupihan, Bataan	
12	Sherilene Parcon	21	Camalaniugan, Cagayan	Top 12
13	Gilmarie Lourdes Pacamarra	18	Camarines Sur	
14	Katherine Aban	20	San Fernando, La Union	Top 12
15	Margaret-Ann Bayot	19	Antipolo	1st Runner-Up
16	Heidi Punsalan	22	Pampanga	Top 12
17	Katherine Anne Manalo	22	Parañaque	Binibining Pilipinas World 2002
18	Anna Teresita Lopez	19	Parañaque	Top 12
19	Karen Loren Agustin	19	Manila	Binibining Pilipinas Universe 2002
20	Maria Lourdes Magno	21	Nueva Ecija	2nd Runner-Up
21	Mary-Ann Samiado	21	Quezon City	
22	Nuriza Abeja Jr.	24	Quezon City	Top 12
23	Maria Criselda Osorio	23	Parañaque	

== Notes ==
=== Post-pageant notes ===
- Karen Loren Agustin competed at Miss Universe 2002 in San Juan, Puerto Rico but was unplaced.
- Katherine Anne Manalo competed at Miss World 2002 in London, United Kingdom and was one of the ten semifinalists.
- Kristine Alzar competed at Miss International 2002 in Tokyo, Japan but was unplaced. Prior to competing in Miss International, Alzar competed at Miss Tourism International Black Sea 2002 and won.
- Margaret-Ann Bayot competed at Miss Internet WWW 2002 and was 2nd Runner-up. She competed again at Binibining Pilipinas 2004 and won Binibining Pilipinas International 2004. She competed at Miss International 2004 in Beijing, China and was one of the fifteen semifinalists.
