= Mutya ng Pilipinas =

Annual national beauty pageant in the Philippines

- Formation: 1968; 58 years ago
- Type: Women's Beauty Pageant
- Headquarters: Quezon City, Metro Manila, Philippines
- Location: Philippines
- Members: 6 (see Titles)
- Official language: Filipino and English
- Chairman: Fred Yuson
- President and National Director: Cory Quirino
- Mutya ng Pilipinas Intercontinental 2025: Christina Vanhefflin; Leyte
- Parent organization: Mutya ng Pilipinas, Inc.
- Website: www.mutyangpilipinas.com

Mutya ng Pilipinas (MNP), in 2019 known as Mutya Pilipinas, is one of the two oldest annual national beauty pageants in the Philippines (est. 1968). The other being the Binibining Pilipinas pageant (est. 1964). Due to the COVID-19 pandemic, the competition was not held in 2020 and 2021.

== History ==
The Mutya ng Pilipinas beauty pageant has produced:

- Five Miss Asia Pacific titles: Maria del Carmen Ines Zaragoza in 1982, Gloria Dimayacyac in 1983, Lorna Legaspi in 1989, Michelle Aldana in 1993, and Sharifa Akeel in 2018.
- Six Miss Tourism International titles: Maria Esperanza Corazon Manzano in 2000, Rizzini Alexis Gomez in 2012, Angeli Dione Gomez in 2013, Jannie Loudette Alipo-on in 2017, Cyrille Payumo in 2019, and Liana Barrido in 2024.
- Three Miss Tourism Queen of the Year International titles: Sherylle Lynne Santarin in 1996, Racquel Uy in 1999, and Leren Mae Bautista in 2015.
- One Miss Tourism Cosmopolitan International title: Barbara Salvador in 2010.
- One Miss Tourism Metropolitan International: Glennifer Perido in 2014.
- One Beauty of the World title: April Love Jordan in 2009.
- One Miss Chinese World title: Annie Uson in 2023.

=== Titles ===
Number of wins under Mutya ng Pilipinas
Current franchises
Pageant	Title	Winning years
Miss Mutya International	0	None
World Top Model	0	None
Top Model of the World	0	None
Miss Environment International	1	2023
Miss Intercontinental	0	None
Miss Chinese World	1	2023
Miss Global Universe	1	2026
Former franchises
Pageant	Title	Winning years
Miss World	0	None
Miss Asia Pacific International	5	1982, 1983, 1989, 1993, 2018
Miss Tourism International	6	2000, 2012, 2013, 2017, 2019, 2024
Miss Global	0	None
Beauty of the World	1	2009
Miss Charm International	0	None
Miss Global Beauty Queen	0	None
Miss Globe International	0	None
Miss Tourism Cosmopolitan International	1	2010
Miss Tourism Metropolitan International	2	2014, 2022
Miss Tourism Queen of the Year International	3	1996, 1999, 2015
Miss Tourism Universe	0	None
Miss Wonderland International	1	1993

From 1977 to 1991 Mutya ng Pilipinas Asia and Mutya ng Pilipinas World competed in 2 international beauty pageants such as Miss Asia Pacific International and Miss World. The runners-up compete in Miss Wonderland International, Miss Tourism International, Miss Intercontinental, Queen of Clubs International, Queen of the Year and Miss Expo International.

One of the titles of Mutya ng Pilipinas, which was first named Mutya ng Pilipinas Asia has undergone name changes starting from 1965 until 1983 for the Miss Asia Quest. Then it was renamed Mutya ng Pilipinas Asia Pacific for Miss Asia Pacific Quest from 1984 until 2004. In 2005, the title was renamed once again to Mutya ng Pilipinas Asia Pacific International for Miss Asia Pacific International Quest. Then in 2006, the Miss Asia Pacific International pageant was completely & officially scrapped with the national titlist nowhere to compete internationally and was retained for 3 years. The winner in 2006 was sent to Miss Intercontinental and in 2007 to Miss Tourism Metropolitan International.

The Mutya organizers finally changed the title to Mutya ng Pilipinas International in 2008 as the top winner and the second winner as Mutya ng Pilipinas Tourism. In 2010, the top prize received the title of Mutya ng Pilipinas Tourism International and the co-winners with the titles of Mutya ng Pilipinas Intercontinental and Asia Pacific International.

In 2014, Miss Intercontinental Philippines delegates are no longer selected by Mutya ng Pilipinas Organization.

In 2018, the primary winners of the pageant namely Mutya ng Pilipinas Asia Pacific International, Mutya ng Pilipinas Tourism International, Mutya ng Pilipinas Tourism Queen of the Year International, and Mutya ng Pilipinas Global Beauty Queen.

In 2019 (on its 51st year), the franchise and leadership was handed over to Cory Quirino who is now the President of re-branded Mutya Pilipinas, Inc. and Fred Yuson as the chairman of the board of the Mutya Pilipinas, Inc. Organization.

On July 27, 2022, a press conference was held in BGC (Bonifacio Global City), Taguig with the organization reverting to its former honored and dignified name of Mutya ng Pilipinas. In its 52nd year, with the collaboration of the dynamic-duo of Cory Quirino and Fred Yuson, a newly conceptualized international pageant is to emerge later this year titled Miss Mutya International. This pageant will objectify the vast culture and heritage of the Philippines which will be conveyed to the rest of the world in its inauguration and in its ensuing years. Furthermore, the Mutya ng Pilipinas Organization and its global pageant elaborated its core principles and mantra of inclusivity and sustainability.

(Mutya (n.) means or synomous to 1. jewel; 2. pearl; 3. charm; 4. darling; 5. amulet.)

In 2023, the organizers will be launching the newest international pageant christened as Miss Mutya International with its concept closely-analogous to the erstwhile Miss Maja International (held in Spain) which was later renamed to Miss Maja del Mundo (Miss Maja of the World) until its last episode in 1995. Maja (fem.) for nice girl in Spanish was distinguished in Madrid back in the 18th century were the Maja wore elaborate traditional Spanish dresses/outfits. The Maja was the frequent subject of painter Francisco Goya and became one of the popular and informal symbols of Spain. Miss Mutya International (translated as Miss Jewel International or Miss Pearl International) will showcase the Philippines' tourism, costumes, customs, culture, and traditions to the rest of the world.

The current national winner, Iona Violeta Abrera Gibbs, was crowned as Mutya ng Pilipinas on December 4, 2022. She will be the Philippines' flag-bearer at the first Miss Mutya International pageant to be held at undisclosed date. Later, she was announced to be the official delegate for the upcoming Miss Intercontinental 2023.

Mutya ng Pilipinas lost the Miss Asia Pacific International franchise to The Miss Philippines in September 2023.

== Titleholders ==
Year	Current titles				Runners up	Special titles	Ref.
Year	Mutya Pilipinas Asia Pacific International	Mutya Pilipinas World Top Model	Mutya Pilipinas Top Model of the World	Mutya Pilipinas Tourism International	Runners up	Special titles	Ref.
2019	Klyza Castro; Davao City	April May Short; Zamboanga City	Tyra Rae Goldman; Nevada	Cyrille Payumo^{1} Pampanga	Cyrille Payumo^{1} Pampanga (1st Runner Up)	Louise Janica An; California (Mutya ng Pilipinas Overseas Communities)	
2019	Klyza Castro; Davao City	April May Short; Zamboanga City	Tyra Rae Goldman; Nevada	Cyrille Payumo^{1} Pampanga	Maxinne Nicole Rangel; Padre Garcia, Batangas (2nd Runner Up)	Louise Janica An; California (Mutya ng Pilipinas Overseas Communities)	
from 2020 – 2021, Mutya ng Pilipinas not held due to the COVID-19 pandemic

Year	Current titles					Runners up	Special titles	Ref.
Year	Mutya ng Pilipinas Intercontinental	Mutya ng Pilipinas World Top Model	Mutya ng Pilipinas Tourism International	Mutya ng Pilipinas Polo Universe	Mutya ng Pilipinas Environment International	Runners up	Special titles	Ref.
2022	Iona Violeta Gibbs^{2} Bataan	Arianna Kyla Padrid; Northern California	Jeanette Reyes; Camarines Sur		Shannon Robinson^{3} Makati	Shannon Robinson^{3} Makati (Mutya ng Pilipinas Luzon)	Jesi Mae Cruz; California (Mutya ng Pilipinas Overseas Communities)	
2022	Iona Violeta Gibbs^{2} Bataan	Arianna Kyla Padrid; Northern California	Jeanette Reyes; Camarines Sur		Shannon Robinson^{3} Makati	Megan Deen Campbell; Lapu-Lapu City (Mutya ng Pilipinas Vizayas)	Jesi Mae Cruz; California (Mutya ng Pilipinas Overseas Communities)	
2022	Iona Violeta Gibbs^{2} Bataan	Arianna Kyla Padrid; Northern California	Jeanette Reyes; Camarines Sur		Shannon Robinson^{3} Makati	Marcelyn Bautista; Tarlac City (Mutya ng Pilipinas Mindanao)	Jesi Mae Cruz; California (Mutya ng Pilipinas Overseas Communities)	
2024	Alyssa Redondo; California	Anne Klein Castro; Pampanga	Liana Barrido; Batangas City		Arianna Pantaleon; Canada	Christine Enero; San Dionisio, Paranaque (Mutya ng Pilipinas Luzon)	Xena Ramos^{4} Manila (Mutya ng Pilipinas Charity)	
2024	Alyssa Redondo; California	Anne Klein Castro; Pampanga	Liana Barrido; Batangas City		Arianna Pantaleon; Canada	Stacey de Ocampo; Pangasinan (Mutya ng Pilipinas Visayas)	Aiyen Maquiraya; Washington (Mutya ng Pilipinas Overseas Communities)	
2024	Alyssa Redondo; California	Anne Klein Castro; Pampanga	Liana Barrido; Batangas City		Arianna Pantaleon; Canada	Jireh Mayani; Davao City (Mutya ng Pilipinas Mindanao)	Aiyen Maquiraya; Washington (Mutya ng Pilipinas Overseas Communities)	
2025	Christina Vanhefflin; Leyte	Naomi Wainwright; Parañaque City	Andrea Endicio^{5} Candelaria, Quezon	Andrea Endicio; Candelaria, Quezon	Title not given	Lyndzy Blyss Maranan; Mabini, Batangas (Mutya ng Pilipinas Luzon)	Ali Hanee Posueamualto; Makati (Mutya ng Pilipinas Charity)	
2025	Christina Vanhefflin; Leyte	Naomi Wainwright; Parañaque City	Andrea Endicio^{5} Candelaria, Quezon	Andrea Endicio; Candelaria, Quezon	Title not given	Eunice Deza; San Pablo City (Mutya ng Pilipinas Visayas)	Ali Hanee Posueamualto; Makati (Mutya ng Pilipinas Charity)	
2025	Christina Vanhefflin; Leyte	Naomi Wainwright; Parañaque City	Andrea Endicio^{5} Candelaria, Quezon	Andrea Endicio; Candelaria, Quezon	Title not given	Juliana Fresado; Iligan City (Mutya ng Pilipinas Mindanao)	Mahalia Bangit; Melbourne, Australia (Mutya ng Pilipinas Overseas Communities)	
2025	Christina Vanhefflin; Leyte	Naomi Wainwright; Parañaque City	Andrea Endicio^{5} Candelaria, Quezon	Andrea Endicio; Candelaria, Quezon	Title not given	Glezette Garcia; Pampanga (Mutya ng Pilipinas Kultura)	Mahalia Bangit; Melbourne, Australia (Mutya ng Pilipinas Overseas Communities)	

Note:

- ^1 Mutya Pilipinas 2019 — 1st Runner up, Cyrille Payumo was later promoted to take the Mutya Pilipinas Tourism International 2019 title.
- ^2 The reigning Mutya ng Pilipinas 2022, Iona Violeta Gibbs was later appointed as Miss Intercontinental Philippines 2023 after the organization acquires the franchise of the international pageant.
- ^3 Mutya ng Pilipinas — Luzon 2022 (Runner Up), Shannon Robinson was later appointed as Miss Environment International Philippines 2023 after the organization acquires the franchise of the international pageant.
- ^4 Mutya ng Pilipinas Charity was a special award during the 53rd edition of the pageant. The title was awarded to Xena Ramos of Manila.
- ^5 The Miss Tourism International franchise is no longer in the hands of Mutya ng Pilipinas after it was acquired by the Miss World Philippines organization.

== International competitions ==
=== Miss Intercontinental ===
Mutya ng Pilipinas in (2022 — Present), previously called as Mutya ng Pilipinas — International in (2008, 2011), Mutya ng Pilipinas — Intercontinental in (2010, 2012), and appointed representatives from (1981, 1983, 1995 — 2007, 2009 — 2011, 2013) were sent to the Miss Intercontinental pageant.

Year	National title	Delegate	Placement	Other awards
1981	—	Zenayda de Andes		
1983	—	Marilou Adina	Top 12 Finalist	
1995	Mutya ng Pilipinas 1994 — Top 10 Semi-Finalist (Appointed)	Maria Sovietskaya Bacud	1st Runner Up	
1996	Mutya ng Pilipinas 1995 — 1st Runner Up (Appointed)	Faith Amigo	Top 10 Finalist	
1997	Mutya ng Pilipinas 1996 — 1st Runner Up (Appointed)	Erlinda Mejia		
1998	Mutya ng Pilipinas 1997 — 1st Runner Up (Appointed)	Rosario Gonzalez		
1999	Mutya ng Pilipinas 1998 — 1st Runner Up (Appointed)	Heidi Punzalan	Did not compete for unknown reason	
2000	Mutya ng Pilipinas 1999 — 1st Runner Up (Appointed)	Ruaina Kiram	Did not compete for unknown reason	
2001	Mutya ng Pilipinas 2000 — 1st Runner Up (Appointed)	Marie Pearl Acas	Did not compete for unknown reason	
2002	Mutya ng Pilipinas 2001 — 1st Runner Up (Appointed)	Michelle Ann Peñez	Did not compete for unknown reason	
2003	Mutya ng Pilipinas 2002 — 1st Runner Up (Appointed)	Kristine Caballero	Did not compete for unknown reason	
2004	Appointed	Jamie Burgos	Top 12 Finalist	
2005	Mutya ng Pilipinas 2005 — 4th Runner Up (Appointed)	Namkeen Hameed		
2006	Mutya ng Pilipinas – Asia Pacific International 2006 (Appointed)	Kirby Ann Basken	Top 12 Finalist	
2007	Mutya ng Pilipinas – Asia Pacific International 2007 (Appointed)	Zephora Mayon	Did not compete and title was abdicated	
2008	Mutya ng Pilipinas – International 2008	Jonavi Raisa Quiray	Did not compete for unknown reason	
2009	Mutya ng Pilipinas – Tourism Aurora 2009 (Appointed)	Jacqueline Schuilipina		
2010	Mutya ng Pilipinas – Intercontinental 2010	Carla Jenina Lizardo	Did not compete due to family situation	
2010	Mutya ng Pilipinas – Asia Pacific International 2010 (Appointed)	Christi Lynn McGarry	Top 15 Finalist	Continental Queen of Asia and the Pacific
2011	Appointed	Kathleen Anne Po		
2011	Mutya ng Pilipinas – International 2011	Vickie Marie Milagrosa Rushton	Did not compete because of the delay in the local pageant schedule.	
2012	Mutya ng Pilipinas – Intercontinental 2012	Camille Guevarra		
2013	Mutya ng Pilipinas – Asia Pacific International 2013 (Appointed)	Andrea Koreen Medina	3rd Runner Up	Continental Queen of Asia & Oceania
From 2014 to 2022 Franchise acquired by Binibining Pilipinas Charities, Inc.
2023	Mutya ng Pilipinas 2022	Iona Violeta Gibbs	Top 22 Finalist	
2024	Mutya ng Pilipinas – Intercontinental 2024	Alyssa Marie Redondo	2nd Runner Up	Miss Power of Beauty
2025	Mutya ng Pilipinas – Intercontinental 2025	Christina Vanhefflin	4th Runner Up	Miss Power of Beauty

=== World Top Model ===
Year	National Title	Delegate	Hometown	International performance		Ref.
Year	National Title	Delegate	Hometown	Placement	Special Awards	Ref.
2019	Mutya Pilipinas — World Top Model 2019	April May Short	Zamboanga City	Top 12 Finalist		
2022	Mutya Pilipinas 2019 – 1st Runner Up	Cyrille Payumo	Pampanga	Only the winner from Italy was announced. No Runners-Up and Finalists this year.		
2023	Mutya ng Pilipinas — World Top Model 2022	Arianna Kyla Padrid	Northern California	1st Runner Up		
2024	Mutya Ng Pilipinas - World Top Model 2024	Anne Klein Castro	Pampanga	Withdrew		
2024	Mutya ng Pilipinas Visayas 2022	Megan Deen Campbell	Lapu-Lapu	1st Runner Up		
2025	Mutya ng Pilipinas – World Top Model 2025	Naomi Raine Wainwright	Parañaque	TBD	TBD	

=== Miss Tourism ===
Mutya ng Pilipinas – Tourism International in (2006 – 2007, 2010, 2012 – 2018, 2023 – 2024) also called Mutya ng Pilipinas – Tourism in (1975 – 1981, 1986 – 1988, 1991, 2025), Mutya ng Pilipinas – Tourism Puerto Princesa in (2008), Mutya ng Pilipinas – Tourism Aurora and appointed representatives from (1994 – 1995, 1998 – 2005, 2009, 2011, 2019 – 2022). Previously, the titleholders were designated as Ambassadress of the Department of Tourism – Philippines.

From 1994, winners or appointed representatives were sent to the Miss Tourism International Pageant.

Year	National title	Delegate	Hometown	International Pageant	Placement	Other awards
1975	Mutya ng Pilipinas – Tourism 1975	Rosario Marissa Recto				
1976	Mutya ng Pilipinas – Tourism 1976	Evangeline Evangelista				
1977	Mutya ng Pilipinas – Tourism 1977	Emma Yuhico				
1978	Mutya ng Pilipinas – Tourism 1978	Mary Yehlen Catral				
1979	Mutya ng Pilipinas – Tourism 1979	Visitacion Agbayani				
1980	Mutya ng Pilipinas – Tourism 1980	Rose Marie de Vera				
1981	Mutya ng Pilipinas – Tourism 1981	Annabelle de Guia				
1986	Mutya ng Pilipinas – Tourism 1986	Sherry Rose Byrne				
1987	Mutya ng Pilipinas – Tourism 1987	Mary Gretchen Hernandez				
1988	Mutya ng Pilipinas – Tourism 1988	Mary Jean Rosales				
1991	Mutya ng Pilipinas – Tourism 1991	Vivian Gobaton				
1994	Mutya ng Pilipinas 1993 – 3rd Runner Up (Appointed)	Maria Riza Martinez	Makati City	Miss Tourism International	4th Runner Up	
1995	Mutya ng Pilipinas 1994 – 3rd Runner Up (Appointed)	Sherilyne Reyes	Cebu City	Miss Tourism International	3rd Runner Up	
1996	There were no international pageant held					
1997	There were no international pageant held					
1998	Mutya ng Pilipinas 1998 – 4th Runner Up (Appointed)	Mellany Gabat	Metro Manila	Miss Tourism International	2nd Runner Up	
1999	Mutya ng Pilipinas 1999 –1st Runner Up (Appointed)	Racquel Uy	Quezon City	Miss Tourism International	1st Runner Up	Miss Tourism Queen of the Year International 1999
2000	Mutya ng Pilipinas 2000 – 3rd Runner Up (Appointed)	Maria Esperanza Corazon Manzano	Quezon City	Miss Tourism International	Miss Tourism International 2000	
2001	Mutya ng Pilipinas 2001 – 3rd Runner Up (Appointed)	Mary Liza Diño	Marikina City	Miss Tourism International	Unplaced	
2002	Mutya ng Pilipinas 2002 – 2nd Runner Up (Appointed)	Frances Margaret Arreza	Las Piñas City	Miss Tourism International	Top 10	
2003	Mutya ng Pilipinas 2003 – 1st Runner Up (Appointed)	Angeline Tucio	Iriga City	Miss Tourism International	Unplaced	
2004	Mutya ng Pilipinas 2004 – 1st Runner Up	Eizza Rancesca Lim	Rizal	Miss Tourism International	Unplaced	
2005	Mutya ng Pilipinas 2005 – 2nd Runner Up (Appointed)	Arabella Hanesh	Pangasinan	Miss Tourism International	Unplaced	
2006	Mutya ng Pilipinas – Tourism International 2006	Vera Eumee Reiter	Quezon City	Miss Tourism International	Unplaced	
2007	Mutya ng Pilipinas – Tourism International 2007	Ana Marie Morelos	Valenzuela City	Miss Tourism Metropolitan International	4th Runner Up	
2008	Mutya ng Pilipinas – Tourism Puerto Princesa 2008	Jam Charish Libatog	Cebu City	Miss Tourism International	Top 15	
2009	Mutya ng Pilipinas – International 2009	Jane Riel Bañares	Legazpi City		Did not compete	
2009	Mutya ng Pilipinas – International 2008	Jonavi Raisa Quiray	Palawan	Miss Tourism International	Unplaced	
2010	Mutya ng Pilipinas – Tourism International 2010	Barbara dela Rosa Salvador	Pangasinan	Miss Tourism International	3rd Runner Up	Miss Tourism Cosmopolitan International 2010
2011	Mutya ng Pilipinas 2011 – 1st Runner Up (Appointed)	Diana Sunshine Rademann	Puerto Princesa City	Miss Tourism International	Unplaced	
2012	Mutya ng pilipinas – Tourism International 2012	Rizzini Alexis Gomez	Mandaue City	Miss Tourism International	Miss Tourism International 2012	
2013	Mutya ng Pilipinas – Tourism International 2013	Angeli Dione Gomez	Cebu City	Miss Tourism International	Miss Tourism International 2013	
2014	Mutya ng Pilipinas – Tourism International 2014	Glennifer Perido	Cordilleras	Miss Tourism International	2nd Runner Up	Miss Tourism Metropolitan International 2014
2015	Mutya ng Pilipinas – Tourism International 2015	Janela Joy Cuaton	Doha, Qatar	Miss Tourism Metropolitan International	1st Runner Up	
2016	Mutya ng Pilipinas – Tourism International 2016	Justin Mae San Jose	Calabarzon	Miss Tourism International	Unplaced	
2017	Mutya ng Pilipinas – Tourism International 2017	Jannie Loudette Alipo-on	Navotas	Miss Tourism International	Miss Tourism International 2017	
2018	Mutya ng Pilipinas – Tourism International 2018	Julieane "Aya" Fernandez	Taguig City	Miss Tourism International	4th Runner Up	Dream Girl of the Year International 2018
2019	Mutya Pilipinas 2019 – 1st Runner Up > Mutya Pilipinas – Tourism International 2019 (Appointed)	Cyrille Payumo	Pampanga	Miss Tourism International	Miss Tourism International 2019	Best in National Costume
2020	Appointed by other organization	Kathie Lee Berco		Miss Tourism International	Unplaced	
2021	Mutya Pilipinas 2019 - Top 12 Finalist (Appointed)	Keinth Jesen Petrasanta	Laguna	Miss Tourism International	6th Runner Up	Miss South East Asia Tourism Ambassadress 2021
2022	Mutya Pilipinas 2019 – Top 20 Finalist (Appointed)	Maria Angelica Pantaliano	Mandaue City	Miss Tourism International	2nd Runner Up	Miss Tourism Metropolitan International 2022 Miss Photogenic
2023	Mutya ng Pilipinas – Tourism International 2022	Jeanette Reyes	Camarines Sur	Miss Tourism International	2nd Runner Up	Miss Tourism Metropolitan International 2023 Miss South East Asia Tourism Ambassadress 2023
2024	Mutya ng Pilipinas – Tourism International 2024	Liana Barrido	Batangas	Miss Tourism International	Miss Tourism International 2024	
2025	Mutya ng Pilipinas – Luzon 2024 > Miss Tourism Philippines 2025 (Appointed)	Christine Eds Enero	Parañaque	Miss Tourism International	1st Runner Up	Miss Tourism Queen of the Year International 2025
2026	Mutya ng Pilipinas – Tourism International 2025 > Mutya ng Pilipinas – Tourism 2025	Ma. Andrea Endico	Candelaria, Quezon	Did not compete due to transfer of Miss Tourism Philippines franchise in Miss World Philippines		

=== Miss Environment International ===
Year	National Title	Delegate	Hometown	International performance		Ref.
Year	National Title	Delegate	Hometown	Placement	Special Awards	Ref.
2023	Mutya ng Pilipinas — Luzon 2022	Shannon Robinson	Makati City	Miss Environment International 2023	Miss Active (Miss Congeniality); 2nd Place for Miss High Fashion Model	
2025	Mutya Ng Pilipinas - Environment International 2024	Arianna Pantaleon	Canada	Miss Environment International 2025	Best in National Costume; Best in Swimsuit; Best in Evening Gown	

=== Miss Chinese World ===
Year	National Title	Delegate	Representing	International performance		Ref.
Year	National Title	Delegate	Representing	Placement	Special awards	Ref.
2023	Mutya ng Pilipinas 2018 – Top 12 Finalist > Mutya ng Pilipinas Chinese World 2023 (Appointed)	Anie Uson Chen	Manila	Miss Chinese World 2023		

=== Miss Global ===
Year	National Title	Delegate	Representing	International performance		Ref.
Year	National Title	Delegate	Representing	Placement	Special awards	Ref.
2025	Mutya ng Pilipinas Charity 2024 > Miss Global Philippines 2025 (Appointed)	Xena Ramos	Manila	4th Runner Up		

=== Miss Global Universe ===
Year	National Title	Delegate	Representing	International performance		Ref.
Year	National Title	Delegate	Representing	Placement	Special awards	Ref.
2026	Mutya ng Pilipinas — Luzon 2025	Lyndzy Blyss Maranan	Mabini, Batangas	Miss Global Universe 2026		

=== Miss Polo Universe ===
Year	National Title	Delegate	Representing	International performance		Ref.
Year	National Title	Delegate	Representing	Placement	Special awards	Ref.
2026	Mutya ng Pilipinas — Tourism International 2025 > Mutya ng Pilipinas Polo Universe 2026 (Appointed)	Andrea Endicio	Candelaria, Quezon	Miss Polo Universe 2026		

=== Special title ===
Mutya ng Pilipinas — Overseas Communities

Year	Delegate	Representing
2006	Christine Adela White	Canada
2007	Jacquiline Charlebois Rodriguez	San Fernando Valley, California, US
2008	Loren Andre Burgos	California, US
2009	Ana Maria Baladad	Texas, US
2010	Christi Lynn McGarry	East Coast, US
2011	Bea Rose Santiago	Canada
2012	Marbee Tiburcio	Northern California, US
2013	Asdis Lisa Karlsdottir	Iceland
2014	Patrizia Lucia Bosco	Milan, Italy
2015	Nina Josie Robertson	Australia
2016	Michelle Thorlund	California, US
2017	Savannah Mari Gankiewicz	Hawaii, US
2018	Jade Skye Roberts	Australia
2019	Louise Janica An	California, US
2020	No pageant held due to COVID-19 pandemic	
2021	No pageant held due to COVID-19 pandemic	
2022	Jesi Mae Cruz	California, US
2024	Aiyen Maquiraya	Washington, US

== See also ==
- Philippines at major beauty pageants
- Big Four beauty pageants
- List of beauty pageants
- Miss Universe Philippines
- Miss World Philippines
- Binibining Pilipinas
- Miss Philippines Earth
- Reina Filipinas
- The Miss Philippines
- Miss Island Philippines
- Mutya ng Pilipinas
- Miss Pearl of the Orient Philippines
- Miss Republic of the Philippines
