= Filipinos in Germany =

- Distribution of Filipino citizens in Germany (2021)

Total population
- 65,000 (2008); Including an estimated 30,000 naturalised Germans of Philippine origin. Regional population figures as of 2003 for Philippine citizens only.

Regions with significant populations
- North Rhine-Westphalia: 4,517
- Hesse: 3,682
- Bavaria: 3,503
- Baden-Wurttemberg: 3,282

Languages
- Filipino, English, and other languages of the Philippines; German

Religion
- Roman Catholicism, Atheism

Related ethnic groups
- Filipino people, Overseas Filipinos

The tens of thousands of Filipinos in Germany consist of people from various walks of life, including migrant workers in the medical sector and marine-based industries, as well as a number of women married to German men they met through international marriage agencies.

== Migration history ==
The history of Filipinos in Germany goes back to the 19th century; national hero José Rizal lived in Germany for some time and finished writing his famous novel Noli Me Tangere while living there, and published it with the assistance of professor Ferdinand Blumentritt; the house where Rizal lived in Berlin sports a commemorative plaque, and efforts are underway to purchase the building from its owner. Mass migration from the Philippines to Germany began in the late 1960s, with large numbers of Filipina nurses taking up employment in German hospitals; however, with the onset of the 1973 oil crisis, German recruitment of gastarbeiter largely came to a halt. Immigration through marriage began in the 1980s, with roughly 1,000 women a year applying at the Philippine Embassy for a Certificate of Legal Capacity to Contract Marriage up until 1990.

== Demography ==
Reliable estimates on the number of Filipinos in Germany are difficult to obtain. The German embassy to the Philippines estimated that 35,000 Philippine citizens worked in Germany as of 2008, and that another 30,000 had naturalised as German citizens. Roughly 1,300 Filipinos acquire German citizenship each year. Official figures of the Federal Statistical Office of Germany showed 23,171 Filipinos residing in the country as of 2003; that number did not include Filipinos naturalised as German citizens, nor those who resided in the country illegally. A 2007 study by scholars of the Philippine Migration Research Network suggested that the number of illegal residents might be as high as 40,000. However, the Philippine consulate-general claims that the number of Filipinos illegally residing in Germany is very small. As a result of the early female-dominated migration of nurses and international marriage agencies in West Germany, the Filipino community is heavily gender-imbalanced, with nearly 3.5 women for every man, according to the Federal Statistical Office of Germany. Only in Hamburg is this ratio reversed.

== Community ==
Filipinos in Germany have established more than one hundred civic organisations. Karaoke contests are a particularly popular form of social gathering. Church-based volunteer work is also widespread and has been particularly successful in encouraging social engagement by female migrants, aimed at assisting the local Filipino community as well as raising money for charity projects in the Philippines. Filipinos are well-integrated into German society, viewed by their neighbours as hardworking, skillful and peaceful. According to a 1997 survey by the Netherlands' Universiteit van Tilburg, 75% feel they have no problems with cultural or linguistic adjustment.

== See also ==
- German settlement in the Philippines
- Germany–Philippines relations
- Filipino diaspora
- Immigration to Germany
