= Bea Santiago =

Miss International 2013, Filipino model, actress and beauty queen

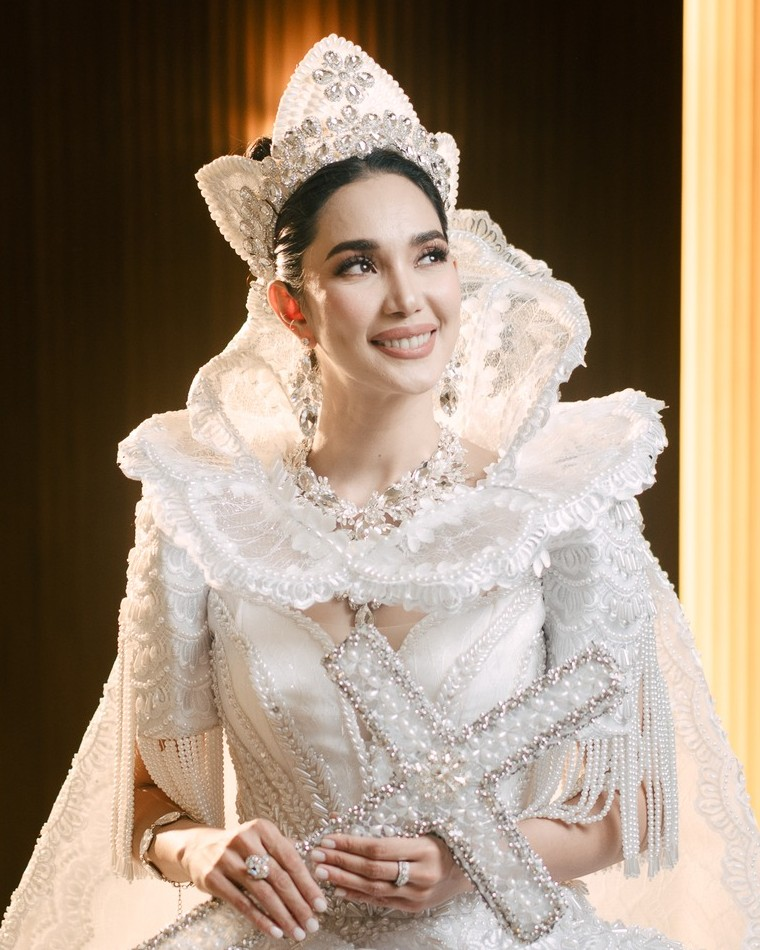
- Santiago in 2025
- Born: Bea Rose Monterde Santiago; February 17, 1990 (age 36); Muntinlupa, Philippines
- Education: York University
- Height: 5 ft 9 in (1.75 m)
- Beauty pageant titleholder
- Title: Mutya ng Pilipinas Overseas Communities 2011; Binibining Pilipinas International 2013; Miss International 2013
- Agency: Binibining Pilipinas Charities, Inc. and Star Magic (2013); Viva Artist Agency (2014– present)
- Hair color: Black
- Eye color: Brown
- Major competitions: Mutya ng Pilipinas 2011; (Top 10); (Mutya ng Pilipinas Overseas Communities 2011); Miss Tourism Queen of the Year International 2012; (Top 10); Binibining Pilipinas 2013; (Winner — Binibining Pilipinas International 2013); Miss International 2013; (Winner)

Bea Rose Monterde Santiago (Tagalog pronunciation: [sɐnˈtjɐgɔ]; born February 17, 1990) is a Filipino actress, model and beauty queen who was crowned Miss International 2013 on December 17, 2013. Prior to her win at Binibining Pilipinas, she was a Mutya ng Pilipinas 2011 titleholder who represented the Filipino community in Canada. She was a fashion model for Elite Model Management before joining Binibining Pilipinas 2013. She was the fifth Filipina to win the Miss International title, after Lara Quigaman in 2005 and before Kylie Verzosa in 2016.

== Early life ==
Bea Rose Monterde Santiago was born in Muntinlupa, moved to Cataingan, Masbate and was raised by her grandparents. She went to Masbate City and attended high school in Liceo de Masbate. She is the eldest of three children. At 15, she and her family moved to Canada where she studied Communications at York University and became a model under Elite Model Management.

== Pageantry ==
=== Mutya ng Pilipinas 2011 ===
Santiago participated in the 2011 edition of Mutya ng Pilipinas, where she won the Mutya ng Pilipinas Overseas Communities title.

=== Miss Tourism Queen of the Year International 2012 ===
Santiago represented the Philippines in Miss Tourism Queen of the Year International 2012, where she placed in the Top 10.

=== Binibining Pilipinas 2013 ===
Santiago represented Masbate in Binibining Pilipinas 2013 and was crowned Binibining Pilipinas International 2013 alongside the Binibining Avon special award. She was crowned by Binibining Pilipinas International 2012, Nicole Schmitz. She was declared as one of the winners along with Miss Universe Philippines 2013, Ariella Arida; Binibining Pilipinas Tourism 2013, Joanna Cindy Miranda; Binibining Pilipinas Supranational 2013, Mutya Johanna Datul; and Binibining Pilipinas 2013 1st Runner-up Pia Wurtzbach.

=== Miss International 2013 ===
She represented the Philippines in Miss International 2013 held in Tokyo, Japan in December 2013. She won beating 66 other contestants and became the fifth Filipino to win the title after Gemma Cruz in 1964, Aurora Pijuan in 1970, Melanie Marquez in 1979 and Lara Quigaman in 2005. In an interview after winning, she dedicated her crown to the victims of Typhoon Haiyan.

During her reign as Miss International 2013, Bea traveled to Japan and Myanmar for charity work with the International Cultural Association.

== Personal life ==
In August 2018, Santiago revealed she was diagnosed with chronic kidney disease after experiencing "several migraines". She believes that her diagnosis was a result of her intense "gym life". In December, Santiago revealed that she had experienced kidney failure and began dialysis at the Toronto General Hospital in Canada. She was also in need of a transplantation. In April 2022, it was revealed that she has received a kidney transplant through her brother.

In 2026, Santiago became engaged to Kurt Cheng.

Awards and achievements
Preceded by (Japan) Ikumi Yoshimatsu	Miss International; 2013	Succeeded by (Puerto Rico) Valerie Hernandez
Preceded by Nicole Schmitz (Cebu City)	Binibining Pilipinas International; 2013	Succeeded by Bianca Guidotti (Taguig)
