= Philippines' Next Top Model season 2 =

Philippines' Next Top Model
- Season 2
- Judges: Maggie Wilson; Kylie Verzosa; Rainer Dagala; Raphael Kiefer
- No. of contestants: 12
- Winner: Angela Lehmann

Release
- Original network: TV5
- Original release: March 21 – May 30, 2017

Season chronology
- ← Previous; Season 1

The second season of Philippines' Next Top Model (subtitled as Philippines' Next Top Model: High Street) premiered on March 21, 2017, on TV5. The series was initially not picked up by RPN after its first season in 2007. In 2013, Solar Entertainment put an effort to produce a second season, but later on cancelled the series. The show announced in late 2016 via Facebook that it would be returning in 2017 on TV5.

The second season was presented by actress and model Maggie Wilson, who took over from model and beauty queen Ruffa Gutierrez. The judging panel was also fully revamped, consisting of Miss International 2016 titleholder Kylie Verzosa, Rainer Dagala and Raphael Kiefer.

The winner of the competition was 25-year-old Angela Lehmann from Bicol.

== Prizes ==
- 1 year talent contract With TV5.
- A trip for 2 to Hong Kong courtesy of Philippine Airlines.
- 1 year ambassadorship worth 2 million pesos with SM Woman.
- 1 year Golds Gym Elite membership.

== Auditions ==
Auditions were held in Baguio, Mandaluyong, Cebu, Davao, in January 2017. Applicants were also encouraged to apply for the competition online if they were unable to make an appearance at the live auditions.

== Cast ==
=== Contestants ===
(Ages stated are at start of contest)

Contestant	Age	Height	Hometown	Finish	Place
Janelle Olafson	27	165 cm (5 ft 5 in)	Mandaluyong	Episode 2	12
Shekinah 'Shekie' Quah	23	170 cm (5 ft 7 in)	Cagayan de Oro	Episode 3	11
Jan Villanueva	24	175 cm (5 ft 9 in)	Bulacan	Episode 4	10
Kim Valies	21	172 cm (5 ft 7 1/2 in)	Bacolod	Episode 5	9
Sarah Edwards	23	163 cm (5 ft 4 in)	Manila	Episode 6	8 (quit)
Ann Vale	20	175 cm (5 ft 9 in)	Bohol	Episode 6	7
Aivie Phan	21	168 cm (5 ft 6 in)	Muntinlupa	Episode 7	6
Blaise Buendia	20	169 cm (5 ft 6 1/2 in)	Antipolo	Episode 9	5
Janilyn 'Janny' Medina	23	165 cm (5 ft 5 in)	Quezon City	Episode 10	4
Ina Guerrero	23	173 cm (5 ft 8 in)	Bicol	Episode 11	3
Adela-Mae Marshall	19	173 cm (5 ft 8 in)	Makati	Episode 11	2
Angela Lehmann	25	173 cm (5 ft 8 in)	Bicol	Episode 11	1

== Results ==
Order	Episodes										
Order	1 (Note: In episode 1, the pool of 24 semifinalists was reduced to the final 12 contestants.)	2	3	4	5	6 (Note: In episode 6, Sarah decided to quit the competition.)	7	8 (Note: In episode 8, Blaise and Janny landed in the bottom two. Neither of them were eliminated.)	9	10	11
1	Ann	Jan	Janny	Blaise	Adela	Angela	Angela	Angela	Ina	Adela	Angela
2	Janny	Adela	Sarah	Adela	Sarah	Janny	Janny	Ina	Angela	Angela	Adela
3	Ina	Sarah	Adela	Ina	Aivie	Blaise	Ina	Adela	Adela	Ina	Ina
4	Adela	Blaise	Ina	Janny	Angela	Adela	Blaise	Blaise; Janny	Janny	Janny	
5	Jan	Kim	Blaise	Sarah	Janny	Ina	Adela	Blaise; Janny	Blaise		
6	Kim	Janny	Angela	Angela	Ina	Aivie	Aivie				
7	Blaise	Ann	Ann	Aivie	Blaise	Ann					
8	Angela	Angela	Jan	Kim	Ann	Sarah					
9	Shekie	Aivie	Kim	Ann	Kim						
10	Aivie	Shekie	Aivie	Jan							
11	Sarah	Ina	Shekie								
12	Janelle	Janelle									

The contestant was eliminated
Indicates that the contestant quit the competition
Indicates the contestant was part of a non-elimination bottom two
The contestant won the competition

=== Scoreboard ===
Place	Model	Episodes							Total Score	Average
Place	Model	5	6	7	8	9	10	11	Total Score	Average
1	Angela	37.0	40.0	40.0	40.0	36.0	35.0	40.0	268.0	38.3
2	Adela	46.0	30.0	21.0	31.0	29.0	40.0	38.0	235.0	33.8
3	Ina	35.0	23.0	27.0	33.0	40.0	31.0	30.0	219.0	31.2
4	Janny	36.0	36.0	35.0	15.0	27.0	21.0		170.0	28.3
5	Blaise	33.0	34.0	25.0	15.0	10.0			117.0	23.4
6	Aivie	40.0	21.0	14.0					75.0	25.0
7	Ann	32.0	19.0						51.0	25.5
8	Sarah	44.0	QUIT						44.0	44.0
9	Kim	29.0							29.0	29.0

Indicates that the contestant had the highest score or best performance
Indicates that the contestant was eliminated
Indicates that the contestant quit the competition
Indicates the contestant was part of a non-elimination bottom two
Indicates that the contestant won the competition

=== Average call-out order ===
Episode 11 is not included.

Rank by average	Place	Model	Call-out total	Number of call-outs	Call-out average
1	2	Adela	24	9	2.67
2	8	Sarah	12	4	3.00
3	1	Angela	31	9	3.44
4		Janny	32	9	3.56
5		Blaise	33	8	4.13
6	3	Ina	38	9	4.22
7	10	Jan	19	3	6.33
8	6	Aivie	41	6	6.83
9	7	Ann	38	5	7.60
10	9	Kim	31	4	7.75
11		Shekie	21	2	10.50
12		Janelle	12	1	12.00

== Bottom two ==
Episode	Contestants			Eliminated
2	Ina	&	Janelle	Janelle
3	Aivie	&	Shekie	Shekie
4	Ann	&	Jan	Jan
5	Ann	&	Kim	Kim
6	Aivie	&	Ann	Sarah
6	Aivie	&	Ann	Ann
7	Adela	&	Aivie	Aivie
8	Blaise	&	Janny	None
9	Blaise	&	Janny	Blaise
10	Ina	&	Janny	Janny
11	Angela, Adela & Ina			Ina
11	Angela & Adela			Adela

The contestant was eliminated after their first time in the bottom two.
The contestant was eliminated after their second time in the bottom two.
The contestant was eliminated after their third time in the bottom two.
The contestant was eliminated after their fourth time in the bottom two.
The contestant was eliminated in the first round of elimination and placed third
The contestant was eliminated and placed as the runner-up.
The contestant was disqualified.
Indicates that the contestant quit the competition
