= Binibining Pilipinas 2013 =

50th Binibining Pilipinas pageant

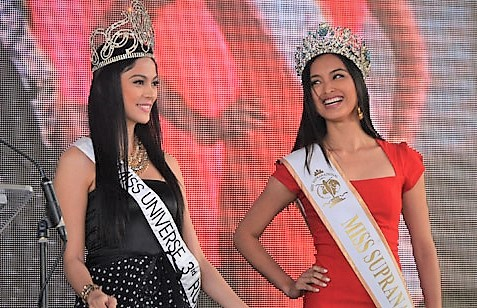
- Ariella Arida and Mutya Johanna Datul
- Date: April 14, 2013
- Presenters: Martin Nievera; Dawn Zulueta; Shamcey Supsup; Venus Raj
- Entertainment: Philippine Philharmonic Orchestra; Sam Milby; Xian Lim; Sam Concepcion; Matteo Guidicelli; Jonathan Badon
- Theme: 50 Beautiful Years
- Venue: Smart Araneta Coliseum, Quezon City, Metro Manila, Philippines
- Broadcaster: ABS-CBN; The Filipino Channel
- Entrants: 50
- Placements: 15
- Winner: Ariella Arida; Alaminos, Laguna
- Congeniality: Lourenz Grace Remetillo; Iligan, Lanao del Norte
- Best National Costume: Maria Teresita Alaine Baccay; Cabanatuan
- Photogenic: Mutya Johanna Datul; Santa Maria, Isabela

Binibining Pilipinas 2013 (billed as Binibining Pilipinas Gold) was the 50th edition of Binibining Pilipinas. It was held at the Smart Araneta Coliseum in Quezon City, Metro Manila, Philippines on April 14, 2013.

At the end of the event, Janine Tugonon crowned Ariella Arida as Miss Universe Philippines 2013, Nicole Schmitz crowned Bea Santiago as Binibining Pilipinas International 2013, and Katrina Dimaranan crowned Cindy Miranda as Binibining Pilipinas Tourism 2013. A new title, Binibining Pilipinas Supranational 2013, was awarded by Ellaine Kay Moll to Mutya Johanna Datul. Pia Wurtzbach was named the sole Runner-Up.

A pre-pageant primer, called The Golden Road to the Crown on ABS-CBN's Sunday's Best, was aired last April 7, 2013.

== Competition ==
=== Judges ===
- James Younghusband – Midfielder for the Philippine national football team
- Boy Abunda – TV personality, publicist, talent manager
- Gen. Alan Purisima – Chief of the Philippine National Police
- Louis Ng – Macanese businessman, Executive Director and COO of SJM Holdings, Ltd.
- Eugenio Lopez, III – Chairman of ABS-CBN Corporation
- Gloria Diaz – Miss Universe 1969
- Liliana Marquez Zawadzky – Colombian interior and jewelry designer
- Hirofumi Hashimoto – Chairman of Miss International
- Bobby Huang – President of San Miguel Brewery, Inc.
- H.E. Roberto Mayorga Lorca – Ambassador Extraordinary and Plenipotentiary of the Embassy of Chile
- H.E. Massimo Roscigno – Ambassador Extraordinary and Plenipotentiary of the Embassy of the Republic of Italy
- Jose Rene Almendras – Secretary to the Cabinet of the Philippines

== Results ==
Color keys

- The contestant Won in an International pageant.
- The contestant was a Runner-up in an International pageant.
- The contestant was a Semi-Finalist in an International pageant.

Placement	Contestant	International Placement
Miss Universe Philippines 2013	Bb. #41 – Ariella Arida	3rd Runner-Up – Miss Universe 2013
Binibining Pilipinas International 2013	Bb. #20 – Bea Rose Santiago	Winner – Miss International 2013
Binibining Pilipinas Tourism 2013	Bb. #16 – Joanna Cindy Miranda	Top 10 – Miss Tourism Queen International 2013
Binibining Pilipinas Supranational 2013	Bb. #39 – Mutya Johanna Datul	Winner – Miss Supranational 2013
Binibining Pilipinas 2013 Runner-Up	Bb. #15 – Pia Wurtzbach	
Top 15	Bb. #12 – Camille Carla Nazar; Bb. #13 – Charmaine Elima; Bb. #22 – Ellore Noelle Punzalan; Bb. #25 – Merry Joyce Respicio; Bb. #31 – Maria Angelica de Leon; Bb. #33 – Parul Shah; Bb. #34 – Grace Yann Apuad; Bb. #43 – Rhea Nakpil; Bb. #45 – Imelda Schweighart; Bb. #46 – Amanda Noelle Navasero	

=== Special awards ===
Award	Contestant	Ref.
Bb. Friendship	Bb. #21 – Lourenz Grace Remetillo	
Bb. Talent	Bb. #10 – Anna Carmela Aquino	
Bb. Best in National Costume	Bb. #37 – Maria Teresita Alaine Baccay	
Bb. Manila Bulletin Readers' Choice Award	Bb. #22 – Ellore Noelle Punzalan	
Bb. Petron	Bb. #16 –Joanna Cindy Miranda	
Bb. Photogenic	Bb. #39 – Mutya Johanna Datul	
Cream Silk Beyond Beautiful Woman Award	Bb. #16 – Joanna Cindy Miranda	
Ms. San Miguel Zero Fit and Sexy Body	Bb. #15 – Pia Wurtzbach	
Bb. Avon	Bb. #20 – Bea Rose Santiago	
Ms. Philippine Airlines	Bb. #4 – Nicole Kim Donesa	
Bb. Pilipinas–PAGCOR Award	Bb. #45 – Imelda Schweighart	
Bb. Best in Swimsuit	Bb. #41 – Ariella Arida	
Bb. Best in Long Gown	Bb. #39 – Mutya Johanna Datul	
Ms. Jag Jeans	Bb. #47 – Aiyanna Camille Mikiewicz	

== Contestants ==
50 contestants competed for the four titles.

No.	Contestant	Age (Note: Ages at the time of the pageant)	Hometown
1	Sissel Ria Rabajante	23	Pasig
2	Maria Bencelle Bianzon	23	Iloilo City
3	Zandra Flores	24	Manaoag
4	Nicole Kim Donesa	18	Quezon City
5	Maria Sofia Gloria Mustonen	23	Valderrama
6	Yvette Chantal Mildenberger	19	Legazpi
7	Maria Ivy Kristel Gonzales	24	Quezon City
8	Abbygale Monderin	20	Antipolo
9	Katherine Anne Enriquez	22	San Mateo
10	Anna Carmela Aquino	22	Taytay
11	Anna Carmina Antonio	22	Cauayan
12	Camille Carla Nazar	23	San Miguel
13	Charmaine Elima	20	Binangonan
14	Mary Rose Pujanes	20	Santo Tomas
15	Pia Wurtzbach	23	Cagayan de Oro
16	Joanna Cindy Miranda	23	Rizal
17	Carin Adrianne Ramos	25	San Pedro
18	Christine Paula Love Bernasor	25	Ormoc
19	Hannah Ruth Sison	24	Ilocos Sur
20	Bea Rose Santiago	23	Cataingan
21	Lourenz Grace Remetillo	25	Iligan City
22	Ellore Noelle Punzalan	26	Las Piñas
23	Leona Paula Santicruz	21	San Luis
24	Marita Cassandra Naidas	22	Antipolo
25	Merry Joyce Respicio	18	Bocaue
26	Anna Fernandina Buquid	22	Nabua
27	Vania Valiry Vispo	24	Tanauan
28	Mercegrace Raquel	19	Licab
29	Pauline Quintas	17	Antipolo
30	Maria Theresa Gorgonio	25	Cebu
31	Maria Angelica de Leon	19	Batangas City
32	Cindy Abundabar	24	Goa
33	Parul Shah	24	San Nicolas
34	Grace Yann Apuad	25	Prosperidad
35	Henna Kaizzelle Nicole Cajandig	20	General Santos
36	Angel May Villafuerte	21	Naga
37	Maria Teresita Alaine Baccay	22	Cabanatuan
38	Mariz Ong	21	Echague
39	Mutya Johanna Datul	20	Santa Maria
40	Jan Helen Villanueva	20	Norzagaray
41	Ariella Arida	24	Alaminos
42	Jacqueline Alexandra Mayoralgo	24	Makati
43	Rhea Nakpil	23	San Mateo
44	Gabrielle Monique Runnstrom	19	Occidental Mindoro
45	Imelda Schweighart	17	Puerto Princesa
46	Amanda Noelle Navasero	21	Makati
47	Aiyanna Camille Mikiewicz	23	Agoo
48	Angeli Dione Gomez	19	Cebu City
49	Herlie Kim Artugue	22	Cebu City
50	Maria Cristina Ann Pascual	21	Taytay

== Notes ==
=== Post-pageant notes ===
- Ariella Arida competed at Miss Universe 2013 in Moscow, Russia and finished as Third Runner-Up. Prior to being called Third Runner-Up, Arida won the online voting which secured her a spot at the Top 16.
- Bea Rose Santiago competed at Miss International 2013 in Tokyo, Japan where she later emerged as the winner. Santiago is the fifth Miss International from the Philippines.
- Cindy Miranda competed at Miss Tourism Queen International 2013 in Xianning, China where she finished as one of the ten finalists. Miranda also bagged the Miss Tourism Ambassador Asia and Best in Attitude awards.
- Mutya Johanna Datul competed at Miss Supranational 2013 in Minsk, Belarus where she was crowned as the winner. Aside from winning the crown, Datul also bagged the Miss Personality award. Datul is the first Miss Supranational from the Philippines.
- Pia Wurtzbach later competed at Binibining Pilipinas 2014 and finished as one of the fifteen semifinalists. Wurtzbach competed again at Binibining Pilipinas 2015 and was crowned Miss Universe Philippines 2015. She competed at Miss Universe 2015 in Las Vegas, Nevada and won.
- Both Hannah Ruth Sison and Parul Shah also competed at Binibining Pilipinas 2014. Sison finished as Second Runner-Up, and competed again in 2015 where she finished as First Runner-Up. Shah on the other had, was crowned Binibining Pilipinas Tourism 2014, and was appointed by Binibining Pilipinas to represent the Philippines at Miss Grand International 2015 in Bangkok, Thailand where she finished as Third Runner-Up.
- Angeli Dione Gomez later competed at Mutya ng Pilipinas 2013 and was crowned Mutya ng Pilipinas Tourism International 2013. She competed at Miss Tourism International 2013-2014 in Putrajaya, Malaysia where she later emerged as the winner. Gomez's win is a back-to-back win after Rizzini Alexis Gomez's win in 2012.
- Imelda Schweighart later competed at Miss Philippines Earth 2016 where she later emerged as the winner. She competed in Miss Earth 2016 but was unplaced. Schweighart later resigned due to controversies prior to, and after Miss Earth 2016.
- Both and Charmaine Elima and Mariel de Leon later competed at Binibining Pilipinas 2017. Elima finished as First Runner-Up, while de Leon emerged as Binibining Pilipinas International 2017. De Leon competed at Miss International 2017 in Tokyo, Japan where she was unplaced.
