= Binibining Pilipinas 2007 =

44th Binibining Pilipinas pageant

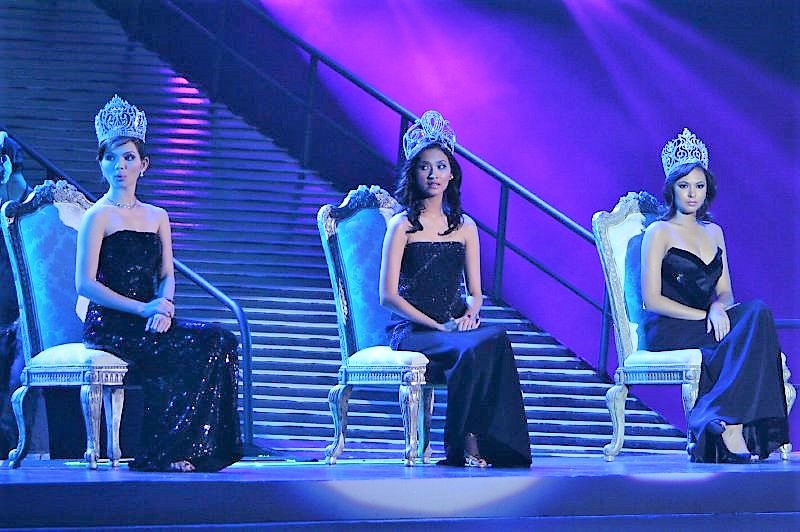
- Binibining Pilipinas 2007 winners from left to right: Nadia Lee Cien Shami (International), Anna Theresa Licaros (Universe), and Maggie Wilson (World)
- Date: March 3, 2007
- Presenters: Paolo Bediones; Raymond Gutierrez; Miriam Quiambao; Gionna Cabrera
- Entertainment: Mark Herras; Marky Cielo; Gian Magdangal
- Venue: Araneta Coliseum, Quezon City, Philippines
- Broadcaster: GMA Network (local); GMA Pinoy TV (international)
- Entrants: 30
- Placements: 13
- Winner: Anna Theresa Licaros; Cuenca, Batangas
- Congeniality: Melanie Adjarani; Zamboanga City
- Photogenic: Margaret Wilson; Bacolod

Binibining Pilipinas 2007 was the 44th edition of Binibining Pilipinas. It took place at the Smart Araneta Coliseum in Quezon City, Metro Manila, Philippines on March 3, 2007.

At the end of the event, Lia Andrea Ramos crowned Anna Theresa Licaros as Binibining Pilipinas Universe 2007, Anna Maris Igpit crowned Margaret Wilson as Binibining Pilipinas World 2007, and Denille Lou Valmonte crowned Nadia Lee Cien Shami as Binibining Pilipinas International 2007. Liezel Verses was named First Runner-Up and Abigail Lesley Cruz was named 2nd Runner-Up.

== Results ==
=== Placements ===
Color keys

- The contestant did not place but won a Special Award in the pageant.
- The contestant did not place.

Placement	Contestant	International Placement
Binibining Pilipinas Universe 2007	Bb. #9 – Anna Theresa Licaros	Miss Photogenic – Miss Universe 2007
Binibining Pilipinas World 2007	Bb. #11 – Margaret Wilson	Unplaced – Miss World 2007
Binibining Pilipinas International 2007	Bb. #14 – Nadia Lee Cien Shami	Unplaced – Miss International 2007
1st Runner-Up	Bb. #24 – Leizel Verses	
2nd Runner-Up	Bb. #3 – Abigail Lesley Cruz	
Top 13	Bb. #4 – Nicole Cassandra Schmitz; Bb. #10 – Theofeliz Marie Francisco; Bb. #12 – Melanie Adjarani; Bb. #13 – Luisa Beltran; Bb. #15 – Edfer Lyn Quintero §; Bb. #18 – Jamie Burgos; Bb. #21 – Keann Mallari; Bb. #26 – Angeline Tucio	

§ – Voted into the Top 13 by Smart texters

=== Special awards ===
Award	Contestant	Ref.
Miss Photogenic	Bb. #11 – Margaret Wilson	
Miss Talent	Bb. #22 – Sheila Margrethe Alonso	
Miss Friendship	Bb. #12 – Melanie Adjarani	
Best In Swimsuit	Bb. #18 – Abigail Lesley Cruz	
Best In Long Gown	Bb. #24 – Leizel Verses	
Smart Texter's Choice	Bb. #15 – Edfer Lyn Quintero	
Miss Natasha	Bb. #9 – Anna Theresa Licaros	
Miss Philippine Airlines	Bb. #9 – Anna Theresa Licaros	
Miss Ever Bilena	Bb. #11 – Margaret Wilson	
Miss Bacchus Energy Drink	Bb. #9 – Anna Theresa Licaros	
Manila Bulletin Reader's Choice	Bb. #27 – Contessa Maria Santos	
Watson's Woman Award	Bb. #9 – Anna Theresa Licaros	
Watson's Style Icon	Bb. #11 – Margaret Wilson	

== Contestants ==
30 contestants competed for the three titles:

No.	Contestant	Age	Hometown
1	Ricamarie Ann Taylor	22	Quezon City
2	Ailyn Luna	17	Cavite
3	Abigail Lesley Cruz	22	Quezon City
4	Nicole Cassandra Schmitz	18	Cebu
5	Melissa Cruz	23	Makati
6	Suzanne Tabitha Mendoza	19	Parañaque
7	Haydee Forbes	23	Bataan
8	Kimberly Buhay	20	Balayan, Batangas
9	Anna Theresa Licaros	22	Cuenca, Batangas
10	Theofeliz Marie Francisco	24	Bulacan
11	Margaret Wilson	17	Bacolod
12	Melanie Adjarani	21	Zamboanga City
13	Luisa Beltran	20	Subic, Zambales
14	Nadia Lee Cien Shami	19	Cotabato
15	Edfer Lyn Quintero	23	Malabon
16	Erika Pangan	19	Marikina
17	Paulette Quinto	25	Boracay, Aklan
18	Jamie Burgos	21	Las Piñas
19	Clayd Torreon	22	Butuan
20	Grezilda Ennis Adelantar	19	Negros Occidental
21	Keann Alonzo Mallari	20	Pampanga
22	Sheila Margrethe Alonso	22	Dumaguete
23	Ferniz Ututalum	23	Davao City
24	Leizel Verses	22	Baguio
25	Maria Eloisa Limpo	22	Mandaluyong
26	Angeline Tucio	22	Bicol
27	Contessa Maria Santos	23	Baguio
28	Mhyrtle Frances Bugarin	21	Mandaluyong
29	Almira Ramos	23	Zambales
30	Grace Patricia Francisco	21	Leyte

== Notes ==
=== Post-pageant notes ===
- Anna Theresa Licaros competed at Miss Universe 2007 in Mexico City but was unplaced. However, Licaros won the Miss Photogenic award.
- Maggie Wilson competed at Miss World 2007 in Sanya, China but was unplaced. Nadia Lee Cien Shami was also unplaced when she competed at Miss International 2007 in Tokyo.
- Nicole Schmitz competed again at Binibining Pilipinas 2012 and won Binibining Pilipinas International 2012. She competed at Miss International 2012 in Okinawa and was one of the fifteen semifinalists.
