= Philippines' Next Top Model season 1 =

Philippines' Next Top Model
- Season 1
- Judges: Ruffa Gutierrez-Bektas; Wilma Doesnt; Pauline Sauco-Juan; Robbie Carmona; Vince Uy; Xander Angeles
- No. of contestants: 14
- Winner: Grendel Alvarado
- Runner-up: Rina Lorilla
- No. of episodes: 14

Release
- Original network: RPN
- Original release: March 13 – June 12, 2007

Season chronology
- Next → Season 2

The first season of Philippines' Next Top Model aired from March 13, 2007 to June 12, 2007 on RPN.

The international destination for this season was Hong Kong.

The winner of the competition was 22-year old Grendel Alvarado from Arayat, Pampanga.

== Cast ==
=== Contestants ===
(Ages stated are at start of contest)

Contestant	Age	Height	Hometown	Finish	Place
Sarah Kae Custodio	19	175 cm (5 ft 9 in)	Laguna	Episode 1	14-13
Marjorie 'Marge' Cornillez	18	173 cm (5 ft 8 in)	Antipolo	Episode 1	14-13
Jean Laurice 'Weng' Santos	18	172 cm (5 ft 7 1/2 in)	Pampanga	Episode 2	12
Maribel 'Mira' Baino	20	174 cm (5 ft 8 1/2 in)	Rizal	Episode 3	11
Raine Larrazabal	21	168 cm (5 ft 6 in)	Quezon City	Episode 4	10
Gemma Gatdula	24	170 cm (5 ft 7 in)	Pampanga	Episode 5	9
Jayna Consolacion Reyes	26	175 cm (5 ft 9 in)	Laguna	Episode 6	8
Sheena Sy	24	168 cm (5 ft 6 in)	Makati	Episode 7	7
Camille 'Bambi' del Rosario	23	170 cm (5 ft 7 in)	Quezon City	Episode 8	6
Dorothy 'Joy' Pagurayan	19	168 cm (5 ft 6 in)	Cagayan de Oro	Episode 9	5
Elvira 'Elf' Stehr	19	178 cm (5 ft 10 in)	Cebu City	Episode 12	4 (quit)
Jenilyn 'Jen' Olivar	21	170 cm (5 ft 7 in)	Las Piñas	Episode 12	3
Rina Lorilla	23	175 cm (5 ft 9 in)	Parañaque	Episode 14	2
Grendel Alvarado	22	173 cm (5 ft 8 in)	Pampanga	Episode 14	1

=== Judge ===
- Ruffa Gutierrez-Bektas (host)
- Wilma Doesnt
- Pauline Sauco-Juan
- Robbie Carmona
- Vince Uy
- Xander Angeles

== Episode summaries ==
=== The Girls Get Waxes ===
Original Airdate: March 13, 2007

PNTM started off by auditioning in Davao held by model Wilma Doesnt, in Cebu held by fashion director Robby Carmona and in Manila held by Wilma Doesnt, Robby Carmona and top model Rissa Mananquil. 3,300 contestants tried out and the girls were whittled down to 27 for the semi-finals.

The 28 girls who are the semi-finals were flown to Hotel Intercontinental, Makati. The girls took their first challenge, and they met Ruffa Guttierez for the first time. While on the final screening, they faced the judges in panel of Robbie Carmona, Wilma Doesnt, and Ruffa Guttierez who tested them in runway challenge and questioned why should they be the Philippines' Next Top Model. Finally, the contestants was narrowed down to 14 girls by the judges and the hopeful models were moved to their fashion-modeled house. The girls were given the chance to choose their own room, as well as beds for the entire run of the show. Since there were only 12 beds, the girls race to claim a space for themselves. Unfortunately, for Elf and Jen, they failed to have their beds for themselves and had to sleep in the living room.

The next year the girls got to meet a special visitor, who gave them a Brazilian wax. Most of the girls felt the waxing was too much and complained about it. After their painful waxing, they had their first photo shoot: a bikini shoot at Rizal Avenue, Manila. The photo shoot was conducted with the help of Xander Angeles, a renowned photographer in the Philippines. Also, to help mentor the girls, Joey Mead King was brought on the set.

During panel, the judges felt that both Sarah Kae and Marge both failed to exert effort during the photo shoot. The judges criticized Sara for not having personality in her photo. Marge, on the other hand, was noted for her poorly done performance and lack of personality. Their photos deemed poor by the judges and criticized them on their lack of personality, the reasons given why both of them were eliminated in the competition.

- Featured photographer: Xander Angeles
- Special guests: Joey Mead King

=== The Girl Who Strikes in Her Attitude ===
Original Airdate: March 20, 2007

The girls got their first runway lesson by Wilma Doesnt and Robby Carmona and were taught how to walk with attitude. The judges gave the girls animal roles to act out while walking on the runway. Their first challenge was to have a fierce runway walk through mud. Sheena sashayed herself a win and picks Raine, Wen and Gemma to share in her prize. The prize was dinner with top models Joey Mead and Rissa Mananquil.

The next day the girls go to Celine where they each got a free bag of products, but they did not know that the challenge is to pose with those bags and also conducted by Raymund Isaac, and announced that there was a tie in the challenge and who were Grendel and Sheena. They won 25 extra frames in the next photoshoot Later that day, the girls get a Ruffa-text about their next photo shoot. The girls arrived at their second shoot and were told it was a high-fashion shoot involving lingerie. Sheena took center stage with her high fashion photo while Bambi, Raine and Weng were commended on their fierce attitude in the shoot.

During the elimination, the judges felt Mira had emotional baggage due to her grandma having surgery during screening day and lacks passion for the competition. They also felt that Weng had a hard time to find the edgy high fashion look that she has. Because of that, it was Weng who was sent home.

- Featured photographer: Xander Angeles, Raymund Isaac (challenge's photographer)
- Special guests: Joey Mead King, Rissa Mananquil

=== The Girl Who Is Confused ===
Original Airdate: March 27, 2007

The episode began with the girls getting their makeovers. Afterwards, the L'Oréal make-up team taught the girls how to put on make-up and also how to change daytime look to a nighttime look. They were then given a challenge to do their own make-up inside a moving car in ten minutes. Bambi won the challenge and picked Jen and Elf to share her prize, a dinner in a restaurant and special gifts courtesy of L'Oréal.

The next day the girls were taken on location and were told about their next photo shoot. They were to pose with reptiles while taking a high fashion beauty shoot. Bambi got scratched by an iguana but did well in the end.

At panel, they were once again challenged to do their make-up. This time, they were given ten minutes to put make-up on for a rock star. Joy was praised for her stunning photo and her confidence in person while Elf, Grendel and Jen were praised for their constant improvements during the competition. Mira was chastised for not improving enough throughout the competition and for looking confused in the photo and in panel. Jayna was criticized for not dressing like a model and for not looking like a model in person and was placed in the bottom of two with Mira. In the end, Jayna's stunning photos saved her and Mira was sent home.

- Featured photographer: Erwin Barleta
- Special guests: Denise Go, Adzna Malli

=== The Girl Who Can Act ===
Original Airdate: April 3, 2007

This week, the remaining ten girls learned the art of acting. They went to a theatre and were greeted by Ruffa who explained the secrets for acting. Ruffa introduced director Fritz who taught the girls of techniques on acting and about having presence in the camera or stage. Afterwards model Joey Mead introduced the girls to their acting challenge. The girls were given props and had to improve emotions with each prop. Some of the girls didn't have any idea on how to use the props while others excelled greatly. Raine ended up winning the challenge with her interpretation of 'sadness' with a remote control. Her prize was a massage and a spa treatment in the house and chose Sheena and Jen to accompany her. While the three girls were receiving their treatment, those who did not win the challenge were forced to clean the house.

Tensions rose as Bambi's personality rubbed some of the contestants the wrong way, especially Joy. The photo shoot theme this week was Murderers on the Loose and took place in an old warehouse. They were asked to pair up and choose who is the murderer and the dead. Grendel, Jen and Rina impressed Vincent Uy, the creative director of Preview magazine in the shoot. During elimination Jayna and Raine landed in the bottom two. Raine's picture was awkward and the judges felt that she doesn't fit into the modeling business. The judges were not impressed with Jayna's picture saying she still rested on looking pretty and criticized her lack of passion. Despite Raine's challenge win, her awkward picture got her the boot.

- Featured photographer: Mark Nicdao
- Special guests: Fritz Ynfante, Joey Mead King, Jigs Mayuga

=== The Girl Who Flew Away ===
Original Airdate: April 10, 2007

The show starts off with the remaining girls packing for an overnight trip to Subic. Little did they know that they will go there for physical training. Headed by military men, Tim and Jun, the exercises included warm-ups, obstacle courses, trekking and wall-climbing. While Bambi earned the ire of Wilma Doesnt due to her lack of commitment for the training, the others seem to have fun. At the end of the trek, the girls did an impromptu photo shoot. Afterwards Wilma revealed that the training was an actual challenge, and discovered most of the girls were not physically fit. However, Elf proved herself to be physically fit and won the challenge and a 'surprise prize' was given to her at the Top Model house.

Returning home, Elf was surprised to find a nice dinner set up at the garden and was even more surprised when Mira appeared. It was revealed that the two of them were having a platonic relationship, even though Elf had a boyfriend. Elf confessed that she indeed had a boyfriend, but that he was cool with the Mira situation.

The next day the girls do a photo shoot where they had to pose as birds flying while jumping on a trampoline.

At judging, the judges were impressed with Grendel, Jayna, Rina, and Jen's photos while Joy and Gemma failed to turn in good shots. In the end, Grendel was called first because of her 'remarkable improvement' while Joy and Gemma were called for the bottom two. Joy was lambasted for her lack of confidence and her slipping performance in shoots and Gemma, though having natural beauty, was criticized for being unable to translate her beauty into photos. Joy was given another chance to turn her performance around whole and Gemma was sent home.

- Featured photographer: Ruben de la Cruz
- Special guests: Tim, Jun, Mira Baino

=== The Girl Who Just Doesn't Get It ===
Original Airdate: April 17, 2007

This week the remaining girls learned the art of being presentable in a party scene from Tim Yap. The girls were taken to Embassy Bar at The Fort where they were secretly observed. The judges were seeing how the girls naturally act without them around and took a look at some of the girls real attitudes. Some of the girls were very confident and presented themselves well, while others failed to show an impressive front. The next day, the girls were cast into a photo shoot where they had to endorse a perfume. Each girl represented a scent and a different word to guide their performance.

At deliberation only Jen, Grendel, Rina, Sheena, and Joy presented good photos. Elf's photo was considered a good beauty shot, but she missed the point of her shoot (per Xander Angeles). Bambi's body language was good in her photo, but her face was off while Jayna once again failed to turn in a good shot. The judges put Jayna and Bambi in bottom two. Though Jayna had a stronger portfolio overall, she lacked consistency in her photographs, and her poor performance at the party didn't bode well for her. Bambi's shoots all looked the same according to the judges. The judges debated on who would go home: the girl who seemed to have given everything but it might not be enough (Bambi), or the girl who has so much to give but doesn't put enough (Jayna). In the end, the judges decide that Jayna's time was up despite a stellar portfolio and potential, and she was sent home leaving the judges in tears and the girls shocked having been a front runner.

- Featured photographer: Juan Caguicla
- Special guests: Tim Yap, Jigs Mayuga

=== The Girl Who Is A Fighter ===
Original Airdate: April 22, 2007

This week the girls began their morning rituals. Some girls practiced their runway skills in the garden whilek others just sat and had a talk. Afterwards, the girls got a lecture from Ms. O (Olen Lim) about the strengths and weaknesses of a model and finding the right position and angle during a shoot, as well as taking the posture in consideration. Bambi won the challenge and she chose Grendel and Joy to share her prize. Her prize is a day of relaxation at The Spa.

Back at the Top Model House, Ruffa Guttierrez made a visit while most of them were preparing for the day. Ruffa had a one-on-one talk with each of them about their standing in the competition. Jen went first and talked about how she landed the top spot from last week's elimination. Next, Bambi felt she had another chance to boost her maturity in the competition, while Sheena struggles because of some family issues. Elf, shed tears about her relationship with her Mom while Rina felt alone after Jayna exited the competition. Grendel and Joy take their time to get some inspiration and after meeting with each contestant, the girls were told to prepare for their next photo shoot.

For their seventh photo shoot the girls had to pose for a beauty shoot with a shoe on top of their head. The shoes were fastened to each girls head as they tried to show some fierceness in the shoot. Also they did a photoshoot while they are playing Volleyball.

Jen and Bambi did well, while the photographer felt Joy and Elf lacks emotion. At deliberation, the judges applauded Elf for her two beautiful photos, which showed her feminine side despite having a hard look, but it was Jen, who won the best photo for the second consecutive time. In the end, Ruffa called Joy, and Sheena to step forward. Ruffa asked each who they thought should be eliminated, but two of them refused to answer. Joy suggested she might be eliminated because of the poor delivery of her photo. Ruffa asked Sheena to tell her what she could offer and why she should stay in the competition. Sheena answered fluently that she would take the judges' critique and use it to her advantage. Despite having an eloquent answer, the judges decided her photos were not enough to save her and Sheena was sent home.

- Featured photographer: Ronald Pineda
- Special guests: Joey Mead King, Jigs Mayuga, Olen Juarez-Lim

=== The Girl Who Made It Work ===
Original Airdate: May 01, 2007

In this episode, the girls learn how to be versatile in the clothes they wear. The girls have a one-on-one session with Joey Mead at the Salabianca learning how to create different attires using different types of clothes. Joey Mead asked the girls to pair up and create an attire for their respective partners. Bambi and Joy were paired together but found that both of them were difficulty due to tension brewing between them. Joy even joked that she's going to make Bambi look like a "mangkukulam" or witch.

The girls met up with Joey Mead again at an ukay-ukay store (Bargain hunting store) and they figured out it was a challenge. The challenge for that day was to emulate the picture of the outfit given to them with only 300 pesos (roughly $6.43). The challenge proved difficult for the girls due to their funds running low and many of them had to resort to haggling. After purchasing their clothing, the girls modeled their looks and Grendel was chosen as the winner. The reward was a 20,000 pesos shopping spree and chose Elf to receive 10,000 pesos shopping spree with her. The girls enjoyed their shopping sprees at CMG and Bysi.

Back in the house, tensions continued to rise between Joy and Bambi. Joy accused Bambi of discriminating against her because she is from the rural while Bambi vehemently declined her accusations leading to Bambi breaking down in the confessional.

For the next photo shoot the girls had to pose with couture gowns. Despite being taught earlier about body control and manipulation, the girls found it hard to pose in their respective gowns.

On deliberation times, the judges gave high prize to Jen's photograph and harshly criticized Bambi's. When it was Joy's turn to be judged she brought up the tension between her and Bambi. Ruffa had Bambi step forward and explain her behavior. Bambi defended that she is not discriminating Joy and claimed she would never let anyone discriminate Joy because she is beautiful. Considering who will be the bottom two, Rina and Bambi were called forward. Rina was called for her lackluster photograph and Bambi for her inability to show more to the judges. After the hard deliberation, Bambi got the boot while Rina moves on to the final five.

- Featured photographer: Jean Young
- Special guests: Joey Mead King

=== The Girl Who Didn't Stand Out ===
Original Airdate: May 08, 2007

Now that the competition is down to five girls, the tension began heating up. Previously Bambi was booted because of her inconsistency with her photographs. The girls went to their next challenge led by fashion director Robbie Carmona, and had to participate in a mini-runway fashion show. They were to model a casual outfit, swimwear, and a fashion couture outfit. Joy was praised for her walk in her yellow one-piece bikini, Jen was criticized for being too 'raw', while Rina got the best shot in her black ball gown dress. Elf again got high praises for her stunning legs during the swimwear run, but in the end Grendel won the challenge for showcasing her versatility.

On their eighth photo-shoot, they had to perform with the rest of the transgender Showgirls of Amazing Philippines and had to stand out while being in a crowd. Jen, Joy and Grendel struggled with their performance, while Rina and Elf showed much confidence during their respective shoots.

That next night Jen, Grendel Joy, Elf, and Rina went up against the judges for deliberations. The judges showcased the least and poor performance of each girl during the run of the show. Joy was criticized because of her beauty queen attitude that she exuded during photo shoots. Grendel and Jen were criticized for playing it too safe and not bringing enough fierceness coming into the finale of the show. They both were becoming more confident but the judges felt it might not be enough for that stage of the competition. Elf was once again berated for her inconsistencies in her photos while Rina was praised for being very confident and having a different look from the other four ladies. Joy and Jen were called for the bottom of two for their poor performances during the competition. Joy was told she had poor delivery of having a showgirl attitude and had been upstaged by the other showgirls. Jen was told she was a pretty girl and should have more confidence in herself as Joy was sent home.

- Featured photographer: Xander Angeles
- Special guests: The Amazing Philippines Showgirls

=== The Girl Who Perfected the Runway ===
Original Airdate: May 15, 2007

Top Model Joey Mead visited the four remaining finalists—Rina, Elf, Grendel and Jen—at the PNTM house to give them a workshop on casting and to share them some advice on how to prepare for a go-see.

After the workshop the girls were brought to the House of Laurel for their challenge. Their challenge was a mock go-see with one of the acclaimed fashion designers in the country, Rajo Laurel. There, the four had to outshine each other by showing off a top model attitude in a high fashion glamour gown walk-off. Afterwards, the girls were interviewed by Rajo and given critiques on their go-see performances. Grendel once again stood out and won the go-see challenge making her the only finalist to win a challenge three times in a row. As a reward, Rajo Laurel gave her a gift certificate courtesy of House of Laurel.

The following day Ruffa texted the girls to gear up for their tenth photo shoot. They were treated to a Brazilian wax at Laybare Salon before heading to Batangas. In Laiya Beach Resort, they posed for an exotic swimwear photo shoot with a Jewel of the Sea theme.

At judging, Wilma, Robby Carmona, Xander Angeles, Vince Uy, and Ruffa Gutierrez were present for the evaluations. Each girl was evaluated one by one with Elf being the only girl to get positive remarks. Rina and Grendel found themselves in the bottom of two and for the first time in the entirety of the competition, none of them got the boot.

- Featured photographer: Xander Angeles
- Special guests: Joey Mead King, Rajo Laurel

=== The Girls Into Reminisce ===
Original Airdate: May 22, 2007

This episode of Philippine's Next Top Model featured a look back at the history of the show. A crisp recap of what had transpired so far as the season finale drew closer. The best and worst moments of the top model finalists were harkened back in an hour-long special recap highlight.

Following the recap the four remaining finalists were informed about an out-of-the-country photo-shoot. A shocking revelation is disclosed regarding Elf's decision to voluntarily leave the show. As emotions and excitement surged higher, more intense showdowns of style and projection are promised for the next episode.

A surprising turn of events is promised and the Final Four girls are to be flown out to Hong Kong. A go-see in one of the prestigious modeling agencies in Hong Kong, a mod photo shoot on the busy streets of Central and Wan Chai Districts, and a shopping spree treat at the famous Causeway Bay are all promised for the next episode of Philippine's Next Top Model.

=== The Girl Who is Lackluster ===
Original Airdate: May 29, 2007

The episode begins by recapping the final four - Rina, Grendel, Jen, and Elf. A surprise at the last elimination revealed that none of the remaining girls were eliminated. The girls are enjoying the last couple of weeks remaining, until the final catwalk, and are relaxing and generally getting along.

The next day Joey Mead visits them at the Top Model house to give a final brief lesson for an International Go-see. Afterwards they were presented with their next challenge. Their first challenge was to do an impromptu commercial brand shoot to present a nicer outlook. Their second challenge was to snag a guy at a socialite party. Model Jeff Rodriguez played the role of the guy as each girl tried their hand at conversing with him. Elf is seen being too sexy with the model, Grendel stood in a starstruck matter and lost points for confidence, Jen felt so nervous around Jeff, and Rina became very overbearing. Afterwards the girls watched their interactions on screen and were critiqued on their performances. Afterwards, each girl got a text from Ruffa telling them about their next photo shoot in Hong Kong.

The girls were tremendously excited about the news until a surprise twist brought their celebration to a halt. After learning about the destination, Elf decided to leave the competition because of her concerns about her family problems back in her hometown. The other girls bid a sad goodbye to Elf as she returns home and away from the competition.

With only three girls remaining, they packed their bags and flew off to Hong Kong. With their arrival the final three had their first pre-challenge given by Robby Carmona. They were to stroll around main city and look for some landmarks to familiarize themselves. After taking some pictures at the landmarks, the girls met Robby and were told to write down all the streets they'd actually seen. Jen answered two correctly, Rina got five, and Grendel remembered eight. Grendel won the challenge and her prize was a shopping spree on the main land.

In a few days, Jen, Rina, and Grendel got to meet Xander for their twelfth photo shoot. It was revealed to the girls that their next photo shoot was a campaign for breast cancer. It was also revealed that the photo shoot was going to be a nude photo shoot and left each girl shocked. Rina went first and had no inhibitions while Jen was nerve-wracked in front of the camera. Grendel did okay but Xander was concerned about her confusing execution.

At the judging panel, Jen, Rina, and Grendel faced the jury once again. Grendel took her evaluation first and was told she needed to relax in her photo. Rina impressed the judges again with her powerful and meaningful shot but lacked facial expression. Jen didn't stand out in her photo but was praised for being tasteful in the shot. Rina got called out first while Grendel and Jen took the bottom two. In the end Jen was booted out of the competition.

- Featured photographer: Xander Angeles
- Special guests: Joey Mead King, Jeff Rodriguez

=== The Girl Who Becomes Philippines' Next Top Model (Part 1) ===
Original Airdate: June 5, 2007

The final two are put to their last challenge where they had to do an international Go-see. They were introduced to the General Manager of Starz People, Ms. Mee Yang, to attend their final challenge. They had to meet three important individuals who would help them with the presentation of their portfolio. First they had to meet international model based in Hong Kong Amanda Leon. Second, they had to introduce themselves to the editor-in-chief of Cover, Jean Pierre Magario. Finally, the girls had a runway challenge and fashion lecture with creative consultant Gregory Derham. After the challenge it was revealed that both girls won the challenge and their prize was a shopping spree at the Central District of Hong Kong.

The next day, the final two went to their final shoot. The theme of the shoot was Street Fashion Couture. Guest make-up artist, Steven Doloso, gave them some final tips to prepare for their looks. The girls had to show the high fashion theme in three different photographs in two different locations.

At judging, Rina was told she gave more flexibility and attitude while Grendel managed to show more of her innate confidence and natural talent. It was announced no one had been eliminated and they headed back to Manila.

- Featured photographer: Xander Angeles
- Special guests: Mee Yang, Gregory Derham, Jean Pierre Magario, Amanda Leon, Steven Doloso

=== The Girl Who Becomes Philippines' Next Top Model (Part 2) ===
Original Airdate: June 12, 2007

The final two flew back to Manila and proceeded to their final series of challenges. Rina and Grendel had their final shoot where they performed some product endorsements for L'Oréal Paris. Being challenged on beauty shoots for the product and TVC requirements, both of them push their skills to the limit. Make-up stylist Jigs Mayuga gave them their final instructions for their shoot while guest photographer, Pat Dy, gave them their last on-screen advise. Later, they went to their commercial endorsement with Robert Quebral coaching the shoot. Afterwards the girls went to a casting for Zara clothing line and went into fitting to ready themselves for the final runway challenge.

The next day, Rina and Grendel faced off with other international models and took the lead during the technical rehearsal. Finally, Rina and Grendel walked the catwalk for the ZARA Summer Collection at NBC Tent, The Fort. The judges were there along with guests like Joey Mead, Tim Yap, and Jigs Mayuga. Grendel had a unique style on the runway while maintaining grace and energy. Rina tried to lessen her fear and gave a confident walk that wowed some of the judges.

At judging, the final two faced their last individual evaluation. Rina went first. The judges comment that her runway walk was only fair in comparison to Grendel's. However, they gave her very high marks on her commercial endorsements and photos. Grendel didn't give as great performance during the shoot but was praised for her performance during the runway challenge.

With a difficult decision in their hands, the judges decided that Grendel is the first winner of Philippines' Next Top Model.

- Featured photographer: Pat Dy, Robert Quebral
- Special guests: Joey Mead King, Tim Yap, Rissa Mananquil

== Results ==
Order	Episodes												
Order	1		2	3	4	5	6	7	8	9	10	12	13
1	Sarah	Jayna	Sheena	Joy	Rina	Grendel	Jen	Elf	Jen	Rina	Elf	Rina	Grendel
2	Rina	Bambi	Grendel	Jen	Grendel	Jayna	Grendel	Bambi	Elf	Elf	Jen	Grendel	Rina
3	Elf	Gemma	Raine	Elf	Jen	Rina	Elf	Jen	Joy	Grendel	Grendel; Rina	Jen	
4	Gemma	Raine	Bambi	Bambi	Sheena	Bambi	Sheena	Grendel	Grendel	Jen	Grendel; Rina	Elf	
5	Mira	Sheena	Joy	Rina	Bambi	Elf	Joy	Rina	Rina	Joy			
6	Jen	Rina	Jayna	Grendel	Elf	Sheena	Rina	Joy	Bambi				
7	Bambi	Mira	Jen	Sheena	Joy	Jen	Bambi	Sheena					
8	Grendel	Joy	Elf	Raine	Gemma	Joy	Jayna						
9	Marge	Elf	Rina	Gemma	Jayna	Gemma							
10	Raine	Weng	Gemma	Jayna	Raine								
11	Jayna	Jen	Mira	Mira									
12	Weng	Grendel	Weng										
13	Sheena	Marge; Sarah											
14	Joy	Marge; Sarah											

The contestant was eliminated
Indicates that the contestant quit the competition
Indicates the contestant was part of a non-elimination bottom two
The contestant won the competition

=== Bottom Two ===
Episodes	Contestants			Eliminated
1	Marge	&	Sarah	Marge
1	Marge	&	Sarah	Sarah
2	Mira	&	Weng	Weng
3	Jayna	&	Mira	Mira
4	Jayna	&	Raine	Raine
5	Gemma	&	Joy	Gemma
6	Bambi	&	Jayna	Jayna
7	Joy	&	Sheena	Sheena
8	Bambi	&	Rina	Bambi
9	Jen	&	Joy	Joy
10	Grendel	&	Rina	None
11	Grendel	&	Jen	Elf
11	Grendel	&	Jen	Jen
12	Grendel	&	Rina	Rina

The contestant was eliminated after their first time in the bottom two
The contestant was eliminated after their second time in the bottom two
The contestant was eliminated after their third time in the bottom two
The contestant quit the competition
The contestant was placed as the runner-up

=== Average call-out order ===
Rank by average	Place	Model	Call-out total	Number of call-outs	Call-out average
1	1	Grendel	29	10	2.90
2	3	Jen	33	10	3.30
3	4	Elf	31	9	3.44
4	2	Rina	39	10	3.90
5	6	Bambi	32	7	4.57
6	7	Sheena	29	6	4.83
7	5	Joy	40	8	5.00
8-9	8	Jayna	35	5	7.00
8-9	10	Raine	21	3	7.00
10	9	Gemma	36	4	9.00
11	11	Mira	22	2	11.00
12	12	Weng	12	1	12.00

=== Photo shoot guide ===
- Episode 1 photo shoot: Bikini in the streets
- Episode 2 photo shoot: High-fashion lingerie
- Episode 3 photo shoot: Reptiles
- Episode 4 photo shoot: Murderers on the loose
- Episode 5 photo shoot: Flights of fancy
- Episode 6 photo shoot: Perfume endorsements
- Episode 7 photo shoot: Beauty shot with shoe; playing volleyball
- Episode 8 photo shoot: Couture portrait
- Episode 9 photo shoot: Showgirls in a carousel
- Episode 10 photo shoot: Swimwear with jewelry; posing in group
- Episode 12 photo shoot: Breast cancer campaign
- Episode 13 photo shoots: Busy streets mod
- Episode 14 photo shoots: L'Oréal endorsement

=== Makeovers ===
- Bambi: Straightened, with china doll bangs
- Elf: Given layers
- Gemma: Brown and wavy
- Grendel: Chestnut brown, pencil-straight hairstyle
- Jayna: Lucy Torres inspired haircut
- Jen: Jenny Shimizu inspired hairstyle
- Joy: Halle Berry inspired haircut
- Mira: Vidal Sassoon inspired asymmetric cut
- Raine: Long and curly brown hairstyle
- Rina: Modern Twiggy inspired haircut
- Sheena: Choppy bangs added
