= Maggie Wilson =

Filipino-British beauty queen, actress

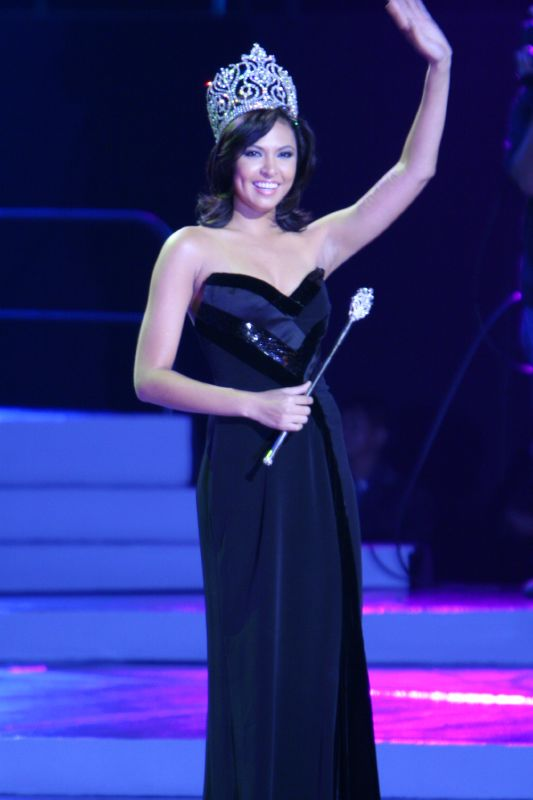
- Wilson in Binibining Pilipinas 2008
- Born: Margaret Nales Wilson; March 15, 1989 (age 37); Bacolod, Philippines
- Other name: Maggie Wilson-Consunji (formerly)
- Height: 1.75 m (5 ft 9 in)
- Spouse: Victor Consunji (m. 2010; sep. 2021)
- Children: 1
- Beauty pageant titleholder
- Title: Binibining Pilipinas World 2007
- Years active: 2003–present
- Major competitions: Binibining Pilipinas 2007 (Winner – Binibining Pilipinas World 2007); Miss World 2007 (Unplaced)

Margaret Nales Wilson (born March 15, 1989) is a Filipino actress and television presenter. She was crowned Binibining Pilipinas World in 2007 and represented the Philippines at Miss World 2007.

She went on to compete in various reality television such as The Amazing Race Asia, winning the fifth season in 2016 with her teammate Parul Shah, as well as hosted in the second cycle of the Philippines' Next Top Model, the show Beached in Metro Channel with Marc Nelson, and as part of MTV Philippines where she hosted the show MTV Time Out.

== Early life ==
Wilson was born on March 15, 1989, in Bacolod to a Filipina mother and Scottish father. Due to her father's job, she grew up mostly in Saudi Arabia. She spent 14 years there, where she attended Al Hekma International School in Jeddah and also learned show jumping at age 11. She described Saudi Arabia as "a very tough country to be a woman in." She also spent time living in Bacolod and Scotland.

In 2004, she moved to Manila.

== Career ==
Wilson's first TV appearance was for GMA Network 7's Kakabakaba Adventure (2003) where she was a regular cast member until the show ended in 2004. Between 2003 and 2011, Wilson appeared and starred in several TV series and soap operas. With supporting roles in All Together Now (2004), Encantadia (2005), Darna (2005), Asian Treasures (2007) and Joaquin Bordado (2008). As part of the main cast in Saang Sulok ng Langit (2005), where she was nominated as Best TV Villain, My Guardian Abby (2006), Darna (2009) and Beauty Queen (2010).

Wilson has also appeared in several TV commercials and advertisements for the Taiwan Tourism Board, Bench, Globe Telecom, Greenwich, Creamsilk, Tresemme, Antica Murrina, Happy Skin & Traveloka and Luminisce Skin.

In 2006, MTV (Philippines) launched Wilson as part of their roster of VJ's (Video Jockey). Where she hosted the show, MTV Time Out, as well concerts featuring of Rihanna, Chris Brown and Christina Aguilera to name a few. She has interviewed Incubus, Fall Out Boy, Simple Plan, Harry Connick Jr. and many more. She was a VJ until 2010.

In 2007, Wilson won Binibining Pilipinas World (Miss World Philippines). She was 17 years old at the time.

She has been featured on the cover of several magazines such as Candy, Chalk, Manual, FHM (Philippines), UNO, Metro Society, Northern Living, Enclaves and Lifestyle Asia.

In 2016, Wilson won the fifth season of The Amazing Race Asia with Parul Shah.

In March 2017, Wilson was cast as the main host for Philippines' Next Top Model cycle 3 on TV5.

Wilson made history in November 2017 when she became the first Filipino woman to complete a marathon in Antarctica.

In October 2018, she opened Casa Consunji, a furniture and decor store.

In 2018-2019, Wilson co-hosted Beached, a travel show on Metro Channel with Marc Nelson.

== Personal life ==
Wilson married Victor Consunji on December 18, 2010. She gave birth to their son Connor in 2012. In an Instagram post on September 27, 2021, Wilson announced her separation from Consunji.

On October 11, 2023, Wilson's 64-year-old mother, "Tita Sonia" was arrested for violation of Republic Act No. 10883, the "New Anti-Carnapping Act of 2016" and was released from jail after posting P300,000 bail. On June 30, 2022, Wilson and British-Thai entrepreneur Tim Jayankura Na Ayudha ("Tim Connor") were accused by Victor Sid B. Consunji with adultery, in a complaint filed with the Taguig Regional Trial Court. Wilson alleged that a baby was born out of the illicit affair between Consunji and the "mistress" businesswoman Rachel Carrasco. In February 2023, Consunji stated that Wilson had been issued 3 and 16 arrest warrants for adultery and Cybercrime Prevention Act of 2012, respectively aside from pending multiple civil cases.

On Mother's Day 2024, Wilson disclosed that a Court Protection Order prevented her from visiting her son Connor. "It's been almost two years since I last held him and 494 days since we last spoke," broken hearted Wilson lamented.

== Filmography ==
=== Television ===
Year	Title	Role
2005	Saang Sulok ng Langit	Bettina
2005	Encantadia	Aera
2005	Etheria	Aera
2005	Mars Ravelo's Darna	Manananggal
2006	My Guardian Abby	Badsy
2007	Asian Treasures	Via
2008	Carlo J. Caparas' Joaquin Bordado	Brianna
2008	Sine Novela: Una Kang Naging Akin	Annie Villanueva
2009–2010	Mars Ravelo's Darna	Octavia Moran / "Lutgarda Morales" / Babaeng Linta
2010	Sine Novela: Kaya Kong Abutin Ang Langit	Ellen
2010–2011	Beauty Queen	Rebecca Rivas
2016	Till I Met You	Ms. Zia Gallinger
2016	Amazing Race Asia Season 5	Herself (contestant)
2017	Philippines' Next Top Model	Herself (host)
2018–2019	Beached	Herself (host)
2019–2020	Thank God It's the Weekend	Herself (host)
2020	Project GO	Herself (host)

=== Film ===
Year	Title	Role	Note(s)	Ref(s).
2005	Let the Love Begin	Bridget		
2011	Joey Gosiengfiao's Temptation Island	Herself (Manila Sunshine Girl 2010)		
2011	Babangluksa	Sheryl		

== See also ==
- Binibining Pilipinas 2007

Preceded by Anna Igpit	Binibining Pilipinas World; 2007	Succeeded by Danielle Castaño
