= Ariella Arida =

Filipino actress and model (born 1988)

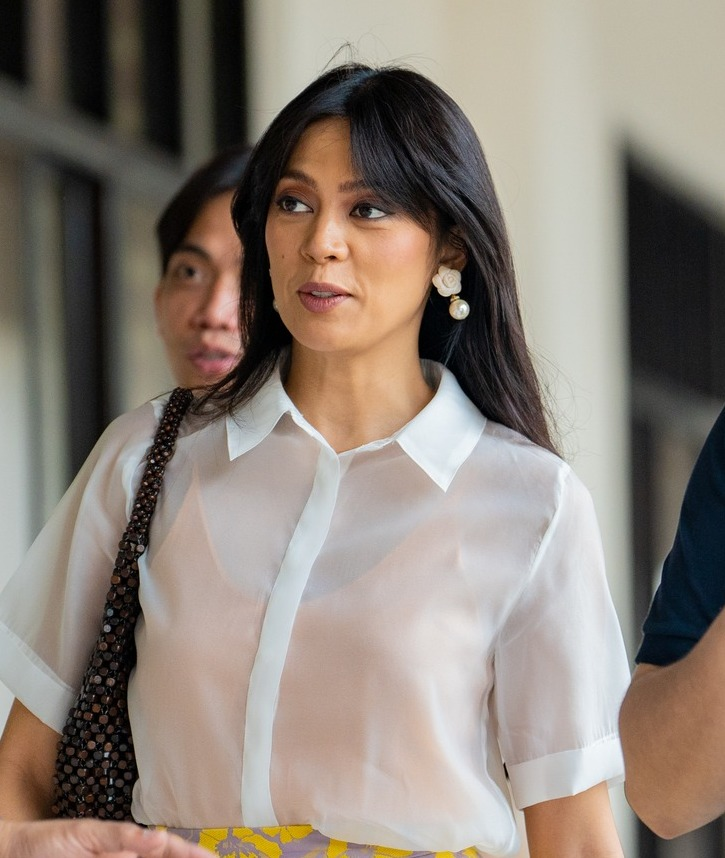
- Arida in 2025
- Born: Ariella Hernandez Arida; November 20, 1988 (age 37); Alaminos, Laguna, Philippines
- Education: University of the Philippines Los Baños (Chemistry)
- Height: 5 ft 7 in (1.70 m)
- Beauty pageant titleholder
- Title: Miss Universe Philippines 2013
- Hair color: Black
- Eye color: Brown
- Major competitions: Miss Philippines Earth 2012; (Unplaced); Binibining Pilipinas 2013; (Winner – Miss Universe Philippines 2013); (Best in Swimsuit); Miss Universe 2013; (3rd Runner-Up); (Ice Princess); (Fan Vote Winner)

Ariella "Ara" Hernandez Arida (Tagalog: [aɾˈjɛlɐ hɛɾˈnɐndɛs ɐˈɾida]; born November 20, 1988) is a Filipino beauty pageant titleholder, actress, and model, who was crowned Miss Universe Philippines 2013. She represented the Philippines at the Miss Universe 2013 competition where she placed as the third runner-up.

Following her career in pageantry, Arida has starred in the films Coming Home (2020) and Sarap Mong Patayin (2021). In 2025, she became the national director of the Miss Universe Philippines Organization for training and development.

== Early life and education ==
Ariella "Ara" Hernandez Arida was born in Alaminos, Laguna, Philippines, to academics Arlesito Arida of Alaminos, and Estella Arida (née Hernandez) of San Pablo. She is a graduate of the University of the Philippines Los Baños with a degree in chemistry. She is a member of Iglesia ni Cristo. Prior to her career in pageantry, Arida was trained under Aces and Queens.

== Pageantry ==
=== Miss Philippines Earth 2012 ===
Arida competed at the Miss Philippines Earth 2012 where she did not place.

=== Binibining Pilipinas 2013 ===
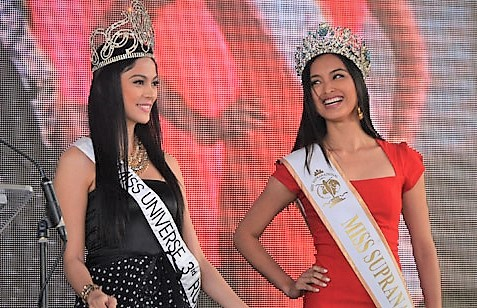
Arida with Miss Supranational 2013 Mutya Datul in 2013

Arida competed at the Binibining Pilipinas 2013 pageant held in the Smart Araneta Coliseum on April 14, 2013. She would advance to the top 15 and win the award for Best in Swimsuit. During the question and answer portion, she was asked: "Name a lesson about life that women can teach men.” In her answer, she emphasized the importance of sensitivity, acknowledging that "men are more logical when it comes to decision[-making]" as women "use our hearts and tend to get emotional in some of our decisions", naming it an attribute that women can teach to men.

At the end of the event, Arida won the Miss Universe Philippines title, being crowned by her predecessor Janine Tugonon, who placed as the first runner-up in Miss Universe in the preceding year.

At the end of her tenure, Arida crowned Mary Jean Lastimosa as her successor at the Binibining Pilipinas 2014.

=== Miss Universe 2013 ===
Arida represented the Philippines at the Miss Universe 2013 pageant at the Crocus City Hall in Moscow, Russia, on November 9, 2013. She won the 16th spot in the semifinals via the online vote. She also bagged the Ice Princess award in the winter-themed glam shot competition.

She would advance to the top five question and answer portion, where she was asked "what can be done about the lack of jobs for young people starting their careers around the world?" In her answer, she called for further investments in education, noting it as her primary advocacy and branding education as the "primary source and ticket to a better future".

Arida finished as third runner-up to Gabriela Isler of Venezuela. Her finish marked the Philippines's fourth consecutive year in the top five. Arida was also the only delegate representing an Asian country to place in the Top 5.

== Post-pageantry ==
Arida was designated as the national director of the Miss Universe Philippines pageant on February 16, 2025, after her predecessor, Shamcey Supsup-Lee, launched a bid for councilor in the 2025 Pasig local elections. The pageant announced that Arida's role as national director will place emphasis on the training and development of its competitors, starting in that year's edition.

== Filmography ==
=== Film ===
Year	Title	Role	Notes	Ref.
2020	Coming Home	Mercy Dungca	Supporting role	
2021	Sarap Mong Patayin	Krista	Main role	

=== Television ===
Year	Title	Role	Network	Ref.
2015	Kapamilya, Deal or No Deal	Lucky Stars/ No. 12	ABS-CBN	
2016–2017; 2021	Wowowin	Herself/Co-host/Guest co-host	GMA Network	
2017	Dear Uge	Ariella	GMA Network	
2017	Asia's Next Top Model	Herself/Cycle 5 Guest	STAR World	
2017	Rated K	Herself/Guest	ABS-CBN	
2017	Tonight with Boy Abunda	Herself/Guest	ABS-CBN	
2017	The Source	Herself/Guest	CNN Philippines	
2017	ANC Headstart with Karen Davila	Herself/Guest	ABS-CBN News Channel	
2018	It’s Showtime	Herself/Judge	ABS-CBN	
2018–2019	Playhouse	Irene Flores	ABS-CBN	
2019–2020	The Killer Bride	Tatiana Dela Torre	ABS-CBN	
2019–2020	Umagang Kay Ganda	Herself/Co-Host	ABS-CBN	
2020	Eat Bulaga!	Herself/Guest Contestant	GMA Network	
2021	The Lost Recipe	Lotus Mandela/Elora	GMA News TV (now GTV)	
2021–2022	Stories From the Heart: The End of Us	Eunice Uytengco	GMA Network	
2022	Wish Ko Lang: Selos	Dayan	GMA Network	
2022	Abot-Kamay na Pangarap	Shamcey	GMA Network	
2023	Black Rider	Therese Soriano	GMA Network	
2025	Shining Inheritance	Sally	GMA Network	
2025	It's Showtime	Herself/Judge	Kapamilya Channel; A2Z; ALLTV; GMA Network	
2025	Beauty Empire	Herself	GMA Network	
2025	Rainbow Rumble	Herself/Contestant	Kapamilya Channel; A2Z; ALLTV	

Awards and achievements
Preceded by (Australia) Renae Ayris	Miss Universe (3rd Runner-Up); 2013	Succeeded by (Netherlands) Yasmin Verheijen
Preceded by Janine Tugonon (Bataan)	Miss Universe Philippines; 2013	Succeeded by Mary Jean Lastimosa (Cotabato)
Preceded by (Portugal) Laura Gonçalves	Fan Vote Winner; Miss Universe; 2013	Succeeded by (Thailand) Chalita Suansane
