= Katrina Dimaranan =

Filipino-American model and actress (born 1993)

- Born: Katrina Jayne Rivera Dimaranan; June 6, 1993 (age 33); San Juan, Metro Manila, Philippines
- Education: Business Administration and Management
- Height: 1.75 m (5 ft 9 in)
- Beauty pageant titleholder
- Title: Binibining Pilipinas Tourism 2012; Miss Supranational USA 2018; Miss Universe Philippines Tourism 2021
- Major competitions: Binibining Pilipinas 2012; (Winner – Binibining Pilipinas Tourism 2012); (Best in Talent); Miss Supranational 2018; (1st Runner-up); (Best Body Figure); Miss Universe Philippines 2021; (Miss Universe Philippines Tourism 2021)
- Website: Katrina Jayne Dimaranan

Katrina Jayne Rivera Dimaranan (born June 6, 1993) is a Filipino-American actress, model, tv host and beauty pageant titleholder who appointed as Miss Supranational USA 2018. then represented the United States at Miss Supranational 2018 pageant and finished 1st Runner-Up along with the Best Body Figure award. She was previously crowned Binibining Pilipinas Tourism 2012 at the Binibining Pilipinas 2012 pageant.

== Early life ==
Katrina Jayne Rivera Dimaranan was born in San Juan, Metro Manila, Philippines to Filipino parents. She worked as an actress and a television host in a Filipino channel in the United States.

== Pageantry ==
=== Binibining Pilipinas 2012 ===
Dimaranan was 18 years old when she joined the Binibining Pilipinas 2012 pageant. She was crowned Binibining Pilipinas Tourism 2012 alongside the Best in Talent award.

=== Miss Tourism Queen International 2012 ===
As the winner of the Binibining Pilipinas Tourism 2012 title, Dimaranan gained the right to represent the Philippines at the Miss Tourism Queen International 2012 pageant. The pageant was set for December 11 to 29, 2012 in China but was cancelled for undisclosed reasons.

=== Miss Supranational USA 2018 ===
Dimaranan was appointed as Miss Supranational USA 2018 gaining the right to represent the United States at the Miss Supranational 2018 pageant.

=== Miss Supranational 2018 ===
Dimaranan represented the United States at the Miss Supranational 2018 pageant. She finished as 1st Runner-Up along with the Best Body Figure award.

=== Miss Universe Philippines 2021 ===
Representing Taguig, Dimaranan was one of the Top 30 delegates that competed for the Miss Universe Philippines 2021 crown on September 30, 2021 in Bohol wherein she finished as Miss Universe Philippines Tourism.

== Filmography ==
=== Film ===
Year	Title	Role	Notes
2017	The Studio	Anastasia	
2020	Lumpia with a Vengeance	Jemini	

=== Television ===
Year	Title	Role	Notes
2013	Binibining Pilipinas 2013	ABS-CBN	
2016–2020	Adobo Nation	The Filipino Channel	
2019	Love Island (American season 1)	CBS	

Awards and achievements
Preceded by Inaugural	Miss Universe Philippines Tourism; 2021	Succeeded by Michelle Dee
Preceded by (Colombia) Tica Martinez	Miss Supranational 1st Runner Up; 2018	Succeeded by (Namibia) Yana Haenisch
Preceded by (New Jersey) Marlene Mendoza	Miss Supranational USA; 2018	Succeeded by (Wisconsin) Regina Gray
Preceded by Isabella Manjon	Binibining Pilipinas Tourism; 2012	Succeeded by Cindy Miranda
