= Philippines' Next Top Model =

- Created by: Tyra Banks
- Developed by: Ken Mok; Kenya Barris
- Presented by: Ruffa Gutierrez; Maggie Wilson
- Judges: Ruffa Gutierrez; Wilma Doesnt; Pauline Sauco-Juan; Robby Carmona; Vince Uy; Xander Angeles; Maggie Wilson; Kylie Verzosa; Rainer Dagala; Raphael Kiefer
- Country of origin: Philippines
- No. of episodes: 24

Production
- Executive producer: Wilson Tieng
- Running time: 60 minutes

Original release
- Network: RPN
- Release: March 13 – June 13, 2007
- Network: TV5
- Release: March 21 – May 30, 2017

Philippines’ Next Top Model (abbreviated PNTM and PhNTM) is a Filipino reality competition where aspiring models compete for the title of Philippines' Next Top Model and a chance to begin their career in the modeling industry. The first season (referred to as "cycles") premiered on RPN on March 13, 2007.

In late 2012, ETC announced a second local Top Model adaptation, called Top Model Philippines with a complete set of judges, but it was suspended in June 2013. However, the second cycle, renamed Philippines' Next Top Model: High Street started airing on March 21, 2017, on TV5.

The first cycle of the series was presented by Ruffa Gutierrez, with cycle 2 being presented by Maggie Wilson. The series employs a panel of four to six judges. The original panel consisted of Gutierrez, Wilma Doesnt, Pauline Sauco, Robby Carmona, Vince Uy, and Xander Angeles before the entire panel was replaced with Wilson, Kylie Verzosa, Rainer Dagala, and Raphael Kiefer in cycle 2.

The first and second cycle comprised a cast of between 12 and 14 female contestants with no previous participation on the series. As of May 2017, two models won the competition; Grendel Alvarado and Angela Lehmann.

== Format ==
Each season of Philippines' Next Top Model has 13 episodes per cycle and starts with 12–14 contestants. Contestants are judged weekly on their overall appearance, participation in challenges, and best shot from that week's photoshoot. A contestant is eliminated every episode, though in rare cases a double elimination or non-elimination is given by consensus of the judging panel. Makeovers are administered to contestants early in the season (usually after the first or second elimination in the finals) and a trip to an international destination is scheduled about two-thirds of the way into the season.

During the first cycle, the show introduced "Ruffa-text" instead the usual Mail in America's Next Top Model – Tyra Mail, among others. In the second cycle, the show brought back the usual Mail, called "Maggie Mail."

== Judges ==
The series employs a panel of judges who critique contestants' progress throughout the competition. Throughout its broadcast, the program has employed ten judges. The original panel consisted of Gutierrez (who also served as its presenter), Wilma Doesnt, Pauline Sauco, Robby Carmona, Vince Uy and Xander Angeles.

For the second cycle, the judges' panel was completely revamped. Gutierrez was replaced by Maggie Wilson as the main judge and presenter. She was joined by Rainer Dagala, Raphael Kiefer and Miss International 2016 titleholder Kylie Verzosa as model mentor. Wilma Doesn't (cycle 1 Model Mentor) serves as runway mentor and guest judge of the cycle 2.

Judges	Cycle	
Judges	1	2
Hosts
Ruffa Gutierrez	Main	
Maggie Wilson		Main
Judging Panelists
Wilma Doesnt	Main	Guest
Pauline Sauco-Juan	Main	
Robby Carmona	Main	
Vince Uy	Main	
Xander Angeles	Main	
Kylie Verzosa		Main
Rainer Dagala		Main
Raphael Kiefer		Main

== Cycles ==
Cycle	Premiere date	Winner	Runner-up	Other contestants in order of elimination	Number of contestants	International Destinations
1	March 13, 2007	Grendel Alvarado	Rina Lorilla	Sarah Kae Custodio & Marge Cornillez, Weng Santos, Mira Baino, Raine Larrazabal, Gemma Gatdula, Jayna Consolacion Reyes, Sheena Sy, Bambi del Rosario, Joy Pagurayan, Elf Stehr (quit), Jen Olivar	14	Hong Kong
2	March 21, 2017	Angela Lehmann	Adela Marshall	Janelle Bianes Olafson, Shekie Danquah, Jan Villanueva, Kim Valies, Sarah Montilla Edwards (quit), Ann Vale Asilo, Aivie Duelas Phan, Blaise Zuraek Buendia, Janny Medina, Ina Guerrero	12	None

=== Philippines' Next Top Model ===
The first cycle of Philippines' Next Top Model aired from March 13, 2007, to June 12, 2007, on RPN. The international destination for this cycle was Victoria, Hong Kong. The winner of the competition was Grendel Alvarado from Arayat, Pampanga.

=== Top Model Philippines ===
In late 2012, ETC announced a second local Top Model adaptation: called Top Model Philippines.

The network announced that model Sarah Meier would be the host and head judge, model-turned-photographer Sean Armenta would serve as the resident photographer and judge, Rissa Mananquil-Trillo would be the model mentor and would also sit as a judge. Former America's Next Top Model producer Michael Carandang was announced as the creative director for photo shoots.

The international destination for the proposed second cycle was to be London, but in June 2013, the management of Solar Entertainment—owner of the ETC channel—announced that the show's production was suspended, citing delays and timing concerns as the primary reason for the cancellation.

=== Philippines' Next Top Model: High Street ===
In mid-2016, TV5 released promotional campaigns announcing open casting calls for Philippines' Next Top Model: High Street. Calls were held in Baguio, Mandaluyong, Cebu, and Davao in January 2017. Maggie Wilson hosted the cycle and was joined by Rainer Dagala, Raphael Kiefer and Miss International 2016 titleholder Kylie Verzosa. The show began airing on March 21, 2017, and the winner was 22-year old Angela Lehmann from Bicol.

== See also ==
- List of Philippine television shows
- Project Runway Philippines
- Asia's Next Top Model
