= Mutya Johanna Datul =

Filipina model, actress, and beauty queen

Mutya Datul
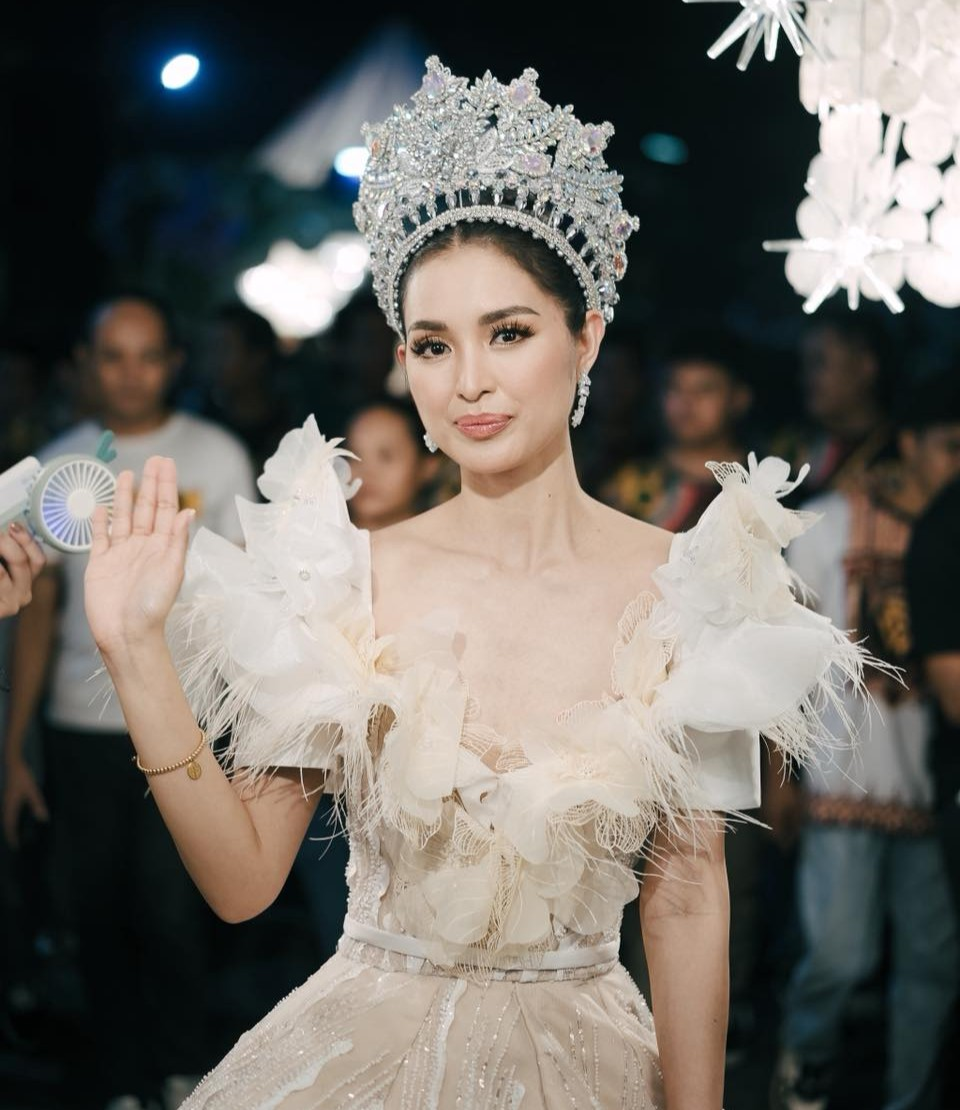
- Datul in 2025
- Born: Mutya Johanna Fontiveros Datul; April 17, 1992 (age 34); Santa Maria, Isabela, Philippines
- Education: Isabela State University; Gardner College
- Height: 1.73 m (5 ft 8 in)
- Beauty pageant titleholder
- Title: Binibining Pilipinas Supranational 2013; Miss Supranational 2013
- Agency: Binibining Pilipinas Charities, Inc.
- Hair color: Black
- Eye color: Dark brown
- Major competitions: Mutya ng Pilipinas 2012 (Top 10); Binibining Pilipinas 2013 (Winner – Binibining Pilipinas Supranational 2013) (Best in Evening Gown) (Miss Photogenic); Miss Supranational 2013 (Winner) (Miss Personality)

Mutya Johanna Fontiveros Datul (born April 17, 1992) is a Filipino fashion and commercial model, actress, and beauty queen who was crowned Miss Supranational 2013, making her the first Asian and first Filipino to win Miss Supranational.

She was previously crowned Binibining Pilipinas Supranational 2013, representing Isabela, during the pageant's 50th edition.

== Biography ==
Datul was born on April 17, 1992, to Wilfredo and Merlie (née Fontiveros) Datul in Santa Maria, Isabela, Philippines. She holds a degree in information technology from the Isabela State University in Ilagan City, and a business administration degree from the Gardner College in Quezon City.

== Pageantry ==
=== Mutya ng Pilipinas 2012 ===
Datul competed and eventually placed in the Top 10 at Mutya ng Pilipinas 2012. After failing to take the crown, she decided to join other local pageants to support her family.

=== Binibining Pilipinas 2013 ===
In early 2013, Datul was selected as one of the 50 contestants for Binibining Pilipinas 2013. Datul was awarded Binibining Photogenic and Binibining Best in Evening Gown. She was ultimately crowned Binibining Pilipinas Supranational 2013 at the Smart Araneta Coliseum in April 2013, gaining the right to represent the Philippines at the Miss Supranational 2013 pageant in Belarus.

=== Miss Supranational 2013 ===
Datul travelled to Minsk, Belarus to represent the Philippines at the Miss Supranational 2013 competition on September 6, 2013. She was awarded Miss Supranational Personality in one of the preliminary events. By the end of the competition, Datul was crowned Miss Supranational 2013 by outgoing titleholder Katsiaryna Buraya. With her victory, Datul became the first Asian and first Filipino to win the Miss Supranational title.

During her reign as Miss Supranational 2013, Datul traveled to China, Gabon, Panama, Poland, Myanmar, Laos, Cambodia, Thailand, Mexico, Colombia, Peru, Spain, India, Lithuania, Finland, Norway, Germany, the Netherlands, New Zealand, and her home country of the Philippines for charity events, as well as to attend, and sometimes sit as a judge in, the Miss Supranational 2014 national competitions in various countries.

Awards and achievements
Preceded by (Belarus) Katsiaryna Buraya	Miss Supranational; 2013	Succeeded by (India) Asha Bhat
Preceded by Elaine Moll (Northern Samar)	Binibining Pilipinas Supranational; 2013	Succeeded by Yvethe Santiago (Albay)
