= Nicole Schmitz =

Filipino-German beauty titleholder (born 1988)

- Born: Nicole Schmitz (Note: Nicole Schmitz was born in Australia. Thus, she does not possess her mother's maiden name which is Maturan.); 28 June 1988 (age 38); Sydney, New South Wales, Australia
- Height: 5 ft 9 in (1.75 m)
- Beauty pageant titleholder
- Title: Binibining Pilipinas International 2012
- Hair color: Brown
- Eye color: Brown
- Major competitions: Binibining Pilipinas 2007 (Top 13); Binibining Pilipinas 2012 (Winner – Binibining Pilipinas International 2012); Miss International 2012 (Top 15)

Nicole Schmitz is a Filipino model and beauty titleholder who represented the Philippines in the Miss International 2012 pageant in Okinawa, Japan on 21 October 2012, where she placed in the Top 15. She is also the third representative of the Philippines to the Miss International pageant of German descent after Miss International 2010 - Top 15 Semi-Finalist, Krista Kleiner and the late Melody Gershbach, Miss International 2009 Top 15 Semi-Finalist.

She is under Rodgil Flores who handled and trained Miss International 2005, Precious Lara Quigaman; Miss International 2008 - Top 12 Semi-Finalist Patricia Fernandez; Miss International 2011 - Top 15 Semi-Finalist Dianne Necio; Miss World 2005 - Top 15 Semi-Finalist Carlene Aguilar; Miss World 2004 - Top 5 Finalist Karla Bautista; Miss Earth Air 2009 Sandra Seifert and Miss Earth 2008 Karla Henry.

== Biography ==
She won the title Binibining Pilipinas International through Binibining Pilipinas 2012 pageant where she was also titled as Best in Swimsuit and Best in National Costume from that edition. In the question-and-answer portion, Schmitz, a law student, was asked by one of the judges John Martin Miller, "Which would you rather be, someone who's respected or someone who is loved and why?" Her answer: "I would rather be someone respected because that means you maintain your integrity, dignity and self-respect and that means that in turn you will be loved by whoever matters and everyone around you." At that time, 'Nicole Schmitz' trended on Twitter both worldwide and in the Philippines.

After winning, she got a courtesy call from the mayor of her hometown Cebu City specifically in Liloan. She received a token of appreciation. She also had a homecoming on her mother's hometown Jimenez, Misamis Occidental, Mindanao. This is where she was also invited as a judge for the Search for BB. Jimenez 2012. She also answered in a different event the question of why "It's More fun in the Philippines": "To be honest, I've just never been anywhere else in the world where the people are so friendly, warm, and able to just have a laugh and joke about themselves. That's truly a unique experience in the Philippines, I think." She added that the Filipinos find joy in the simplest things and this is one more reason why it is more fun in the Philippines.

She also entered Top 13 in Binibining Pilipinas 2007. In the question-and-answer portion, she was asked by one of the judges Miss Universe 1994 Philippines' representative Charlene Gonzales: "What is your biggest fear and what have you done to overcome it?" Her response: "My greatest fear is actually having regret. In anyone's life, it doesn't benefit them if they're gonna regret something so what I do to combat that is that I just make sure that everything I do it's because I want to do it. I don't do something with any doubts in my mind. I do it with sureness and I'm very confident in myself and in that way, that's how I combat that. Thank you."

She entered the top 15 on Miss International 2012 continuing the streak of the Philippines now for five years. She had her final speech as:

"Peace, love, unity, these 3 words are the Miss International pageant. Having spent the past 3 weeks in Okinawa, I have witnessed the special connection it has with the world. Globalization and multi cultural diversity can exist. We can be uniquely global and globally unique. This is my mission. I want people to appreciate that we not only belong to local communities but world at large. By this understanding we can contribute to global goals. I am standing here in front of you open to offer my heritage and myself, as a strong compassionate responsible and independent woman in this quest for global harmony. And I can stand here proudly and consider myself an international citizen".

She has been doing modelling internationally on the side for 7 years now. She described herself as a "pretty laid-back and easy-going, although she is not into nudity or sleazy pictures. Sophisticated sexy and edgy attitude is what she's into. She believes with this mixture gives me unique look, something that can be played upon and developed in pictures." Nicole is currently studying Law/Psychology at Macquarie University in Sydney, Australia and is expected to graduate with honors.

== Credentials ==
=== Television ===
- Hayop sa Galing (TV5 - 2012) - Guest
- Minute to Win It (ABS-CBN - 2012) - Guest
- The Buzz (ABS-CBN - 2012) - Guest
- Kris TV (ABS-CBN - 2012) - Guest
- Rated Korina (DZMM - 2012) - Guest

=== Competitions ===
- MISS INTERNATIONAL 2012 - TOP 15
- BINIBINING PILIPINAS - (BINIBINING PILIPINAS INTERNATIONAL 2012
  - Best In Swimsuit
  - Best in National Costume
- MISS PHILIPPINES-AUSTRALIA - WINNER 2008
  - Best in Long Gown
  - Best in Swimsuit
  - Best in National Costume
  - Miss Photogenic
- MODEL QUEST AUSTRALIA - WINNER 2007
  - Best in Ramp
  - Best in Street wear
  - Best in Swimsuit
  - Best in Evening Gown
- BINIBINING PILIPINAS (MISS PHILIPPINES) - FINALIST 2007
- MISS MANDAUE PHILIPPINES - WINNER 2006
  - Best in National Costume
  - Best in Evening Gown
- MISS TEEN PHILIPPINES - 1ST RUNNER-UP 2006

=== Ramp Experience ===
- Jag Fashion Show - 2012
- Philippine Airlines Fashion Show - 2012
- Paddington Fashion Parade - Mackenzie
- Fashion for a Cause - Mackenzie, Amy Lea Taylor
- Various Ramp Shows including brands such as LEE, BENSON, [etc. - 2006-2008
- CUMBIA COLUMBIAN Clothing - Manila 2007
- BENCH FEVER Fashion Show - Manila Fashion Week 2006
- Nokia Fashion Showcase - 2006
- RUDY PROJECT Eyewear Fashion Show - 2006
- Sydney South-Western BRIDAL EXPO - 2005

=== Print Experience ===
- Araneta Center - 2012
- Desire Autumn Catelogue
- Boat Charter Business Website Print Material - 2009
- Face of G.O.D CLOTHING Australia - 2008
- Face of SAWO SAUNAS Finland - 2007
- DICKIES Catalogue Model Philippines - 2006
- LEE Catalogue Model Philippines - 2006
- Oz Racing Face of DUCATI Motorcycles Philippines - 2006

=== TV/Hosting/Presenting Experience ===
- Channel 7 Morning Show - Bikini Model Summer Fashion
- NRL Dragons TV Presenter 2009
- CEBU CHILDREN'S MODELLING WORKSHOP - Philippines 2007

=== Judge ===
- BB. JIMENEZ Philippines - 2012
- COVERGIRL MODEL COMPETITION Australia - 2007 - 2009
- MISS MANDAUE Philippines - 2007

== See also ==
- Philippines at major beauty pageants
- Binibining Pilipinas
- Binibining Pilipinas 2007
- Binibining Pilipinas 2012
- Miss International 2012

== Notes ==
Awards and achievements
Preceded by Dianne Necio (Polangui, Albay)	Binibining Pilipinas International; 2012	Succeeded by Bea Santiago (Cataingan, Masbate)
