= Miss and Mister Supranational USA =

Beauty contest

Miss Supranational USA
- Formation: 2011; 15 years ago
- Type: Beauty pageant
- Location: United States
- Members: Miss and Mister Supranational
- Official language: English
- National Director: RPM Productions

Miss and Mister Supranational USA also referred to as Supranational United States is a national beauty pageant that selects US representatives for the global Miss Supranational and Mister Supranational competitions, which take place annually in Poland.

The current Miss Supranational USA is Marley Stokes from South Carolina and Mister Supranational USA is Marco Ybarra from Texas.

== U.S. representatives at international competitions ==
=== Miss Supranational USA ===
- : Declared as Winner
- : Ended as Runner-up
- : Ended as one of the Semi-finalists or Quarter-finalists

Year	Representative's Name	Age (Note: Age when crowned the national title.)	State Represented	Hometown	Placement	Special Awards
2011	Krystelle Khoury	19	California	Los Angeles	4th Runner-up	
2012	Yamile Mufdi	26	Florida	Miami	Unplaced	
2013	Kristy Abreu	19	New York	Westchester	Unplaced	
2014	Allyn Rose	26	Maryland	Baltimore	3rd Runner-up	Miss Fashion World
2015	Kelly Kirstein	26	Michigan	Mount Clemens	Top 20	
2016	Alexis Sherril	24	North Carolina	Durham	Unplaced	
2017	Marlene Mendoza	27	New Jersey	Paterson	Unplaced	
2018	Katrina Dimaranan	25	California	Union City	1st Runner-up	Best Body Figure
2019	Regina Gray	28	Wisconsin	Milwaukee	Top 10	Miss Supranational America
2020	Due to the impact of COVID-19 pandemic, no Miss Supranational pageant in 2020					
2021	Shivali Patel	24	North Carolina	Raleigh	Unplaced	
2022	Sofia Acosta	26	Florida	Miami	Unplaced	
2023	Rylee Spinks	22	Nevada	Sparks	Unplaced	
2024	Jenna Dykstra	28	Minnesota	Clearwater	1st Runner-up	
2025	Marvelous Sanyaolu	22	Louisiana	Baton Rouge	Top 12	Miss Supranational America
2026	Marley Stokes	27	South Carolina	Lexington	Top 24	From the Ground Up

=== Mister Supranational USA ===
- : Declared as Winner
- : Ended as Runner-up
- : Ended as one of the Semi-finalists or Quarter-finalists

Year	Representative's Name	Age (Note: Age when crowned the national title.)	State Represented	Hometown	Placement	Special Awards
2016	Walker Barnes	23	Florida	Tampa	Unplaced	
2017	Cody Ondrick	22	Rhode Island	Providence	Top 10	Mr Supranational America
2018	Nicholas Kotselas	25	California	San Diego	Top 10	Mr Supranational America
2019	Nate Crnkovich	24	Nebraska	Omaha	Mister Supranational 2019	Supra Top Model
2020	Due to the impact of COVID-19 pandemic, no Miss Supranational pageant in 2020					
2021	Felix Martin II	32	Florida	Hollywood	Unplaced	
2022	Keith Williams	31	New Jersey	Trenton	Unplaced	
2023	Daniel Zemeida	23	Arizona	Peoria	Top 20	
2024	Alan Hierro	32	New York	New York City	Unplaced	
2025	Christopher Cox	32	Hawaii	Honolulu	Unplaced	
2026	Marco Ybarra	29	Texas	Houston	Unplaced	
