= Laws of the 16th Congress of the Philippines =

Laws passed by 16th Congress of Philippines

The following is the list of laws passed by the 16th Congress of the Philippines:

Date approved	RA number	Title/category	Affected municipality or city	Affected province
2013-12-26	10634	Supplemental Appropriations Act for 2013		
2014-03-16	10635	Establishing the Maritime Industry Authority (MARINA) as solely responsible for the 1978 STCW Convention		
2014-06-16	10636	Granting Citizenship to a Person: Andray Blatche		
2014-06-16	10637	Electric Power Distribution Franchise : Cotabato Light and Power Company	Cotabato City, Datu Odin Sinsuat, Sultan Kudarat	Maguindanao
2014-06-16	10638	Amending the Philippine National Railways Act or RA 4156: Extending the Life of the PNR		
2014-06-20	10639	Free Mobile Disaster Alerts Act		
2014-07-15	10640	Amending the Comprehensive Dangerous Drugs Act or RA 9165: Strengthening the Anti-Drug Campaign		
2014-07-15	10641	Amending RA 7721: Allowing Full Entry of Foreign Banks		
2014-07-15	10642	Philippine Lemon Law		
2014-07-15	10643	Graphic Health Warnings Law		
2014-07-15	10644	Go Negosyo Act		
2014-11-05	10645	Amending RA 7432: Mandatory PHILHEALTH Coverage for All Senior Citizens		
2014-11-08	10646	Creating a Government-Owned or -Controlled Corporation : Charter of the Quezon City Development Authority	Quezon City	NCR
2014-11-21	10647	Ladderized Education Act of 2014		
2014-11-27	10648	Iskolar ng Bayan Act of 2014		
2014-11-27	10649	Amending RA 6948: Increasing the Burial Assistance for Military Veterans		
2014-12-09	10650	Open Distance Learning Act		
2014-12-29	10651	General Appropriations Act		
2014-12-23	10652	Supplemental Appropriations Act of 2014		
2015-02-12	10653	Amending the National Internal Revenue Code of 1997 or RA 8424 : Adjusting the 13th Month Pay and Other Benefits Ceiling		
2015-02-27	10654	Amending the Philippine Fisheries Code of 1998 or RA 8550 : Adopting the Precautionary Principle and Ecosystem-Based Approach		
2015-03-13	10655	Amending the Revised Penal Code or Act No. 3815 : Repealing the Crime of Premature Marriage		
2015-03-25	10656	Amending the Synchronized Barangay and Sangguniang Kabataan Elections Act or RA 9164 : Postponing the Sangguniang Kabataan Elections		
2015-03-27	10657	Chemistry Profession Act : Repealing the Chemistry Law of the Philippines or RA 754		
2015-03-27	10658	Creating a Legislative District : Lone District of the City of Biñan	Biñan	Laguna
2015-03-27	10659	Sugarcane Industry Development Act of 2015		
2015-04-16	10660	Amending PD 1606 : Further Strengthening the Organization of the Sandiganbayan		
2015-05-29	10661	National Children's Month Act : November		
2015-07-03	10662	Renaming a Road : Senator Benigno S. Aquino, Jr. Avenue	Pavia, Santa Barbara, Cabatuan, Iloilo City	Iloilo
2015-07-03	10663	Renaming a Road : President Corazon C. Aquino Avenue	Iloilo City, Pavia	Iloilo
2015-07-06	10664	Armed Forces of the Filipino People Week : Last Full Week of August		
2015-07-09	10665	Open High School System Act		
2015-07-21	10666	Children's Safety on Motorcycles Act of 2015		
2015-07-21	10667	Philippine Competition Act		
2015-07-21	10668	An Act Allowing Foreign Vessels to Transport and Co-Load Foreign Cargoes for Domestic Transshipment and For Other Purposes		
2015-08-18	10669	Jesse Robredo Day: August 18		
2015-08-20	10670	Renaming a Road : Gov. Benjamin "Kokoy" T. Romualdez Diversion Road	Tacloban City	Leyte
2015-08-19	10671	Renaming a Hospital : Salvador R. Encinas District Hospital	Gubat	Sorsogon
2015-08-19	10672	Granting Citizenship to a Person : Farrell Eldrian Wu		
2015-08-19	10673	Reapportioning Legislative Districts of a Province	[Second] Bauan, Lobo, Mabini, San Luis, San Pascual, and Tingloy; [Fourth] Ibaan, Padre Garcia, Rosario, San Jose, San Juan, and Taysan; [Fifth] Bantangas City; [Sixth] Lipa City	Batangas
2015-08-19	10674	Establishing a Sports Center : Davao Del Norte Regional Sports Academy	Tagum City	Davao del Norte
2015-08-19	10675	Converting a Municipality into a Component City	General Trias	Cavite
2015-08-26	10676	Student-Athletes Protection Act		
2015-08-26	10677	Increasing Bed Capacity of a Hospital : Northern Mindanao Medical Center	Cagayan De Oro City	Misamis Oriental
2015-08-26	10678	Amending RA 7179 : Converting the Davao Regional Hospital into Davo Regional Medical Center	Tagum City	Davao del Norte
2015-08-27	10679	Youth Entrepreneurship Act		
2015-08-27	10680	Establishing a Sports Center : Misamis Occidental Sports Academy	Oroquieta City	Misamis Occidental
2015-08-27	10681	Establishing a Sports Center: Talisay Sports Academy and Training Center	Talisay City	Cebu
2015-08-27	10682	Establishing a Sports Center: Alfonso Sports Academy and Training Center	Alfonso City	Cavite
2015-09-18	10683	Establishing a Sports Center: Siargao Island Sports Academy and Training Center	Dapa	Surigao del Norte
2015-09-18	10684	Creating an Additional Legislative District	New 7th District: Alcantara, Alegria, Badian, Dumanjug, Ginatilan, Malabuyoc, Moalboal, and Ronda. New 2nd District: Alcoy, Argao, Boljoon, Dalaguete, Oslob, Samboan, and Santander	Cebu
2015-09-28	10685	Granting Citizenship to a Person : Peter Leslie Wallace		
2015-10-11	10686	Creating a Registry of Deeds	Ipil	Zamboanga Sibugay
2015-10-15	10687	Unified Student Financial Assistance System for Tertiary Education (UniFAST) Act		
2015-10-20	10688	Metallurgical Engineering Act of 2015 : Repealing the Metallurgical Engineering Law of the Philippines or PD 1536		
2015-10-23	10689	National Indigenous Peoples Day : August 9		
2015-10-23	10690	The Forestry Profession Act : Repealing the Forestry Profession Law or RA 6239		
2015-10-26	10691	Amending the Public Employment Service Office Act of 1999 or RA 8759		
2015-11-03	10692	The Philippine Atmospheric, Geophysical, and Astronomical Services Administration (PAGASA) Modernization Act		
2015-11-03	10693	Microfinance NGOs Act		
2015-11-11	10694	Creating additional Branches of the Municipal Trial Court	Angeles City, Mabalacat City, Magalang	Pampanga
2015-11-11	10695	Creating an additional Branch of the Regional Trial Court	San Jose Del Monte City	Bulacan
2015-11-11	10696	Creating additional Branches of the Regional Trial Court and the Municipal Trial Court	Baguio	Benguet
2015-11-13	10697	Strategic Trade Management Act (STMA)		
2015-11-13	10698	Naval Architecture Law		
2015-11-13	10699	National Athletes and Coaches Benefits and Incentives Act : Repealing RA 9064		
2015-11-20	10700	Creating additional Branches of the Regional Trial Court	San Jose City	Nueva Ecija
2015-11-20	10701	Creating additional Branches of the Regional Trial Court	Initao	Misamis Oriental
2015-11-20	10702	Creating additional Branches of the Regional Trial Court	Meycauayan City	Bulacan
2015-11-20	10703	Creating additional Branches of the Regional Trial Court	Guihulngan City	Negros Orienta
2015-11-20	10704	Creating additional Branches of the Regional Trial Court	Quezon City	NCR
2015-11-20	10705	Converting a Municipal Circuit Trial Court into a Municipal Trial Court	Carmona	Cavite
2015-11-26	10706	Seafarers Protection Act		
2015-11-26	10707	Amending the Probation Law of 1976 or PD 968		
2015-12-09	10708	The Tax Incentives Management and Transparency Act (TIMTA)		
2015-12-09	10709	Annual Thirty Day Leave Privileges for First Level Courts' Judges		
2015-12-09	10710	Creating additional Branches of the Regional Trial Court	Alaminos, Dagupan, San Carlos	Pangasinan
2015-12-09	10711	Creating additional Branches of the Regional Trial Court and the Metropolitan Trial Court	Pasay	NCR
2015-12-09	10712	Creating additional Branches of the Regional Trial Court	Sorsogon City	Sorsogon
2015-12-09	10713	Creating additional Branches of the Regional Trial Court	Paranaque City	NCR
2015-12-09	10714	Creating additional Branches of the Regional Trial Court	Vigan City	Ilocos Sur
2015-12-09	10715	Creating additional Branches of the Regional Trial Court	Bacolod City	Negros Occidental
2015-12-10	10716	Changing the Name of a National High School : Corazon C. Aquino National High School	Quezon City	NCR
2015-12-10	10717	Appropriations Act of 2016		
2015-12-29	10718	Converting a High School Annex into an Independent National High School : Balbalan National High School	Balbalan	Kalinga
2015-12-29	10719	Converting a High School Annex into an Independent National High School : Abuyo National High School	Alfonso Castañeda	Nueva Vizcaya
2015-12-29	10720	Converting a High School Annex into an Independent National High School : Consuelo National High School	Santa Marcela	Apayao
2015-12-29	10721	Converting a High School Annex into an Independent National High School : Palandok National High School	Leon B. Postigo	Zamboanga Del Norte
2015-12-29	10722	Converting a High School Annex into an Independent National High School : Colongulo National High School	Surallah	South Cotabato
2015-12-29	10723	Converting a High School Annex into an Independent National High School : Tumog National Agricultural and Trade High School	Luna	Apayao
2015-12-29	10724	Converting a High School Annex into an Independent National High School : Santa Fe National High School	New Corella	Davao Del Norte
2015-12-29	10725	Converting a High School Annex into an Independent National High School : Kabugao National High School	Kabugao	Apayao
2015-12-29	10726	Converting a High School Annex into an Independent National High School : General Licerio Topacio National High School	Imus City	Cavite
2015-12-29	10727	Converting a High School Annex into an Independent National High School : Saint Peter National High School	Malaybalay City	Bukidnon
2015-12-29	10728	Converting a High School Annex into an Independent National High School : Tabuan National High School	Tukuran	Zamboanga Del Sur
2015-12-29	10729	Converting a High School Annex into an Independent National High School : Daniel C. Mantos National High School	Mahayag	Zamboanga Del Sur
2015-12-29	10730	Establishing a National High School : Maria Clara Lobregat National High School	Dumalinao	Zamboanga Del Sur
2015-12-29	10731	Establishing a National High School : Libagon National High School	Libagon	Southern Leyte
2015-12-29	10732	Establishing a National Science High School : Navotas National Science High School	Navotas	NCR
2015-12-29	10733	Converting an Elementary School into an Integrated School: Andres Bonifacio Integrated School	Iloilo City	Iloilo
2015-12-29	10734	Converting a High School Annex into an Independent National High School : Tinuyop National High School	Leon B. Postigo	Zamboanga Del Norte
2015-12-29	10735	Converting a High School Annex into an Independent National High School : Talinga National High School	Leon B. Postigo	Zamboanga Del Norte
2015-12-29	10736	Converting a High School Annex into an Independent National High School : Little Baguio National High School	San Fernando	Bukidnon
2015-12-29	10737	Converting a High School Annex into an Independent National High School : Santa Filomena School of Arts and Trades	Calanasan	Apayao
2015-12-29	10738	Converting a High School Annex into an Independent National High School : Buloron National High School	Midsalip	Zamboanga Del Sur
2015-12-29	10739	Creating additional Branches of the Regional Trial Court	Munoz City	Nueva Ecija
2016-01-03	10740	Converting a High School Annex into an Independent National High School : Corazon C. Aquino National High School	Compostela	Compostela Valley
2016-01-12	10741	Amending the Labor Code of the Philippines or PD 442 : Strengthening the Operations of the National Labor Relations Commission		
2016-01-15	10742	Sangguniang Kabataan Reform Act of 2015		
2016-01-29	10743	Declaring Every October 5 as National Teachers' Day		
2016-02-06	10744	Credit Surety Fund Cooperative Act of 2015		
2016-02-26	10745	Amending the Biofuels Act of 2006 or RA 9367 : Allowing Use of Neat Diesel as Alternative Fuel in Natural Gas Power Generating Plants		
2016-03-03	10746	Changing the Name of a National High School : Dr. Manuel T. Cases Sr. National High School	Agoo	La Union
2016-03-03	10747	Rare Diseases Act of the Philippines		
2016-03-07	10748	Changing the Name of an Elementary School : Dr. Manuel T. Cases Sr. Elementary School	Agoo	La Union
2016-03-07	10749	Changing the Name of an Elementary School : San Manuel Sur Elementary School	Agoo	La Union
2016-03-07	10750	Changing the Name of a National High School : Sixto A. Abao National High School	Mahinog	Camiguin
2016-03-07	10751	Changing the Name of an Elementary School : Alberto G. Bautista Elementary School	Talugtug	Nueva Ecija
2016-03-07	10752	The Right-of-Way Act		
2016-03-07	10753	Radio and Television Broadcasting Franchise Renewal : Interactive Broadcast Media, Inc		
2016-03-23	10754	Amending the Magna Carta For Persons with Disability : Expanding the Benefits and Privileges of Persons with Disability		
2016-03-29	10755	Amending the Administrative Code of 1987 or EO 292 : Authorizing Punong Barangay to Administer the Oath of Office of Any Government Official		
2016-04-08	10756	Election Service Reform Act		
2016-04-08	10757	Amending the Labor Code of the Philippines or PD 442 : Reducing the Retirement Age of Surface Mine Workers		
2016-04-15	10758	Converting an Extension Office into a Regular Office (LTO)	Agoo	La Union
2016-04-15	10759	Converting an Extension Office into a Regular Office (LTO)	Bayawan	Negros Oriental
2016-04-15	10760	Creating a Regular District Office of the LTO	Nabunturan	Compostela Valley
2016-04-15	10761	Creating a Regular District Office of the LTO	Irosin	Sorsogon
2016-04-15	10762	Converting an Extension Office into a Regular Office (LTO)	Cabadbaran	Agusan del Norte
2016-04-15	10763	Creating a Regular District Office of the LTO	Carmona	Cavite
2016-04-15	10764	Creating a Regular District Office of the LTO	Malita	Davao Occidental
2016-04-15	10765	Converting an Extension Office into a Regular Office (LTO)	Tigaon	Camarines Sur
2016-04-19	10766	Amending The Human Rights Victims Reparation and Recognition Act of 2013 or RA 10368 : Extending the Life of the Human Rights Victims Claims Board		
2016-04-26	10767	Comprehensive Tuberculosis Elimination Plan Act		
2016-04-26	10768	Declaring Every August 11 a Special Working Holiday in Iligan City in Commemoration of its Charter Day	Iligan City	Isabela
2016-04-26	10769	Converting an Extension Office into a Regular Office (LTO)	Santa Maria	Bulacan
2016-04-26	10770	Increasing Bed Capacity of a Hospital : Vicente Sotto Memorial Medical Center	Cebu City	Cebu
2016-04-29	10771	Philippine Green Jobs Act of 2016		
2016-05-03	10772	Radio and Television Broadcasting Franchise Renewal : Christian Era Broadcasting Service International Incorporated (RA 7618)		
2016-05-03	10773	Radio and Television Broadcasting Franchise Renewal : Eagle Broadcasting Corporation (RA 7299)		
2016-05-03	10774	Declaring Every March 9 a Special Working Holiday to Commemorate the Foundation of the Abra Province and the Culmination of the Abrenian Kawayan Festival		Abra
2016-05-03	10775	Declaring Every June 21 a Special Working Holiday in Tagaytay City in Commemoration of its Founding	Tagaytay City	Cavite
2016-05-03	10776	Declaring Every May 8 as Special Working Holiday in Hermosa, Bataan	Hermosa	Bataan
2016-05-03	10777	Declaring Every September 1 as Special Working Holiday in North Cotabato in Commemoration of Its Foundation		North Cotabato
2016-05-03	10778	Converting a High School Annex into an Independent National High School : La Huerta National High School	Parañaque City	NCR
2016-05-03	10779	Converting a High School Annex into an Independent National High School : Tabio National High School	Mankayan	Benguet
2016-05-03	10780	Converting a High School Annex into an Independent National High School : Paraiso National High School	Mahayag	Zamboanga Del Sur
2016-05-03	10781	Creating a Regular District Office of the LTO	Imus	Cavite
2016-05-03	10782	Creating a Regular District Office of the LTO	Orani	Bataan
2016-05-03	10783	Converting an Extension Office into a Regular Office (LTO)	Kabacan	Cotabato
2016-05-03	10784	Converting an Extension Office into a Regular Office (LTO)	Tagaytay City	Cavite
2016-05-03	10785	Establishing a Securities and Exchange Commission Office	Bacolod City	Negros Occidental
2016-05-03	10786	Declaring Every 4th Week of September as the National Thyroid Cancer Awareness Week		
2016-05-03	10787	Establishing a Marine Hatchery	Lingig	Surigao Del Sur
2016-05-03	10788	Declaring Every April 16 as Special Working Holiday in Marikina City in Commemoration of its Foundation	Marikina	NCR
2016-05-03	10789	Racehorse Jockeys Retirement Act		
2016-05-03	10790	Radio and Television Broadcasting Franchise Renewal : Aliw Broadcasting Corporation (RA 7399)		
2016-05-03	10791	Converting a High School Annex into an Independent National High School : Camp 30 National High School	Atok	Benguet
2016-05-10	10792	Telecommunications Franchise Renewal : Contel Communications, Inc as Grantee and Assignee of Conception Industries, Inc, the Original Grantee (RA 7401)		
2016-05-10	10793	Radio and Television Broadcasting Franchise Renewal : Radio Veritas-Global Broadcasting System, Inc (RA 7579)		
2016-05-10	10794	Radio and Television Broadcasting Franchise Renewal : Mabuhay Broadcasting System, Inc (RA 7395)		
2016-05-10	10795	Electric Power Distribution Franchise Renewal : Tarlac Electric, Inc (RA 7606)	Tarlac City	Tarlac
2016-05-10	10796	Declaring a National Shrine : Balete Pass	Santa Fe	Nueva Vizcaya
2016-05-10	10797	Renaming an Educational Institution : Camp Jesse M. Robredo Regional Training Center 7 of the National Police Training Institute (Philippine Public Safety College)	Consolacion	Cebu
2016-05-10	10798	Creating a Regular District Office of the LTO	Antipolo	Rizal
2016-05-10	10799	Creating a Regular District Office of the LTO	La Libertad	Negros Oriental
2016-05-10	10800	Converting a State College into a State University : Tarlac Agricultural University	Camiling	Tarlac
2016-05-10	10801	Overseas Workers Welfare Administration Act		
2016-05-11	10802	Declaring Every July 4 as Special Working Holiday in the Lanao Del Sur Province in Commemoration of its Foundation		Lanao Del Sur
2016-05-11	10803	Declaring Every June 30 as Special Working Holiday in Imus City in Commemoration of its Foundation	Imus City	Cavite
2016-05-11	10804	Declaring Every September 29 as Special Working Holiday in Bacoor City in Commemoration of its Foundation	Bacoor	Cavite
2016-05-11	10805	Declaring Every December 29 as Special Working Holiday in the Municipality of Leon in Honor of Captain Jose Calugas, Sr.	Leon	Iloilo
2016-05-11	10806	Declaring Every October 31 as Special Working Holiday in the Municipality of Porac in Commemoration of its Foundation	Porac	Pampanga
2016-05-11	10807	Declaring Every February 13 as Special Working Holiday in Parañaque City in Commemoration of its Foundation	Parañaque City	NCR
2016-05-11	10808	Converting a High School into a National High School : Payatan National High School	Goa	Camarines Sur
2016-05-11	10809	Converting a High School Annex into an Independent National High School : Lamo National High School (Repealing RA 9779)	Dupax Del Norte	Nueva Vizcaya
2016-05-11	10810	Converting a High School Annex into an Independent National High School : Malihud National High School	Bataraza	Palawan
2016-05-11	10811	Converting a High School Annex into an Independent National High School : Monte Alegre National High School	Aurora	Zamboanga Del Sur
2016-05-11	10812	Establishing a National High School : San Roque National High School	Zamboanga City	
2016-05-11	10813	Establishing a Freshwater Hatchery	Jabonga	Agusan Del Norte
2016-05-13	10814	Declaring Every June 23 as Special Working Holiday in Bacoor City in Commemoration of its Cityhood	Bacoor	Cavite
2016-05-16	10815	Establishing a TESDA Center : Rizal, Occidental Mindoro TESDA Training and Accreditation Center Act	Rizal	Occidental Mindoro
2016-05-16	10816	Farm Tourism Development Act of 2016		
2016-05-16	10817	Philippine Halal Export Development and Promotion Act of 2016		
2016-05-18	10818	Radio and Television Broadcasting Franchise Renewal : Radio Mindanao Network, Inc		
2016-05-18	10819	Radio and Television Broadcasting Franchise Renewal : Far East Broadcasting Companies (Philippines), Inc (RA 8115)		
2016-05-18	10820	Radio and Television Broadcasting Franchise Renewal : Progressive Broadcasting Corporation (RA 7163, RA 8162)		
2016-05-18	10821	Children's Emergency Relief and Protection Act		
2016-05-18	10822	Telecommunications Franchise : Pipol Broadband and Telecommunications Corporation		
2016-05-18	10823	Changing the Name of an Agricultural School : Nueva Vizcaya Polytechnic Institute	Kasibu	Nueva Vizcaya
2016-05-18	10824	Changing the Name of a Fisheries School : Masbate Institute of Fisheries and Technology	Milagros	Masbate
2016-05-19	10825	Establishing a Marine Hatchery	Surigao City, Del Carmen	Surigao Del Norte
2016-05-19	10826	Establishing a Marine Nursery	Kalamansig	Sultan Kudarat
2016-05-19	10827	Converting an Extension Office into a Regular Office (LTO)	Parañaque City	NCR
2016-05-19	10828	Creating a Regular District Office of the LTO	Alabel	Sarangani
2016-05-11	10829	Establishing a National Science High School : Pasay City National Science High School	Pasay	NCR
2016-05-11	10830	Converting an Elementary School into an Integrated School: Bakhaw Integrated School	Iloilo City	Iloilo
2016-05-11	10831	Establishing a National High School : Balukbahan National High School	Bayog	Zamboanga Del Sur
2016-05-11	10832	Establishing a National High School : Dionisio Lopez, Sr. National High School	Malangas	Zamboanga Sibugay
2016-05-11	10833	Converting a High School into a National High School : Bentuco National High School	Gubat	Sorsogon
2016-05-11	10834	Converting a High School Annex into an Independent National High School : Tinorongan National High School	Sangay	Camarines Sur
2016-05-11	10835	Converting a High School Annex into an Independent National High School : Tulungatung National High School	Zamboanga City	
2016-05-11	10836	Converting a High School Annex into an Independent National High School : Pasonanca National High School	Zamboanga City	
2016-05-11	10837	Converting a High School Annex into an Independent National High School : Don Galo National High School	Parañaque City	NCR
2016-05-11	10838	Converting a High School Annex into an Independent National High School : Malatgao National High School	Quezon	Palawan
2016-05-11	10839	Converting a National High School into a National Vocational High School : Sadanga National Technical-Vocational and Skills Training High School	Sadanga	Mountain Province
2016-05-11	10840	Converting a National High School into a National Vocational High School : Saliok National Technical-Vocational and Skills Training High School	Natonin	Mountain Province
2016-05-11	10841	Converting a High School Annex into an Independent National High School : Matti National High School	Digos	Davao Del Sur
2016-05-11	10842	Converting an Elementary School into an Integrated School: Hulo Integrated School	Mandalyong City	NCR
2016-05-11	10843	Converting an Elementary School into an Integrated School: Lakeview Integrated School	Muntinlupa	NCR
2016-05-23	10844	Department of Information and Communications Technology Act of 2015		
2016-05-23	10845	Anti-Agricultural Smuggling Act of 2016		
2016-05-23	10846	Amending RA 3591 Creating the Philippine Deposit Insurance Corporation : Enhancing the Resolution and Liquidation Framework for Banks		
2016-05-23	10847	Amending RA 4373 on the Practice and Operation of Social Work in the Philippines : Lowering Board Examination Applicants' Age Requirement, Providing for Continuing Social Work Education, and Upgrading Other Provisions		
2016-05-23	10848	Amending the Agricultural Tariffication Act (RA 8178) : Extending the Implementation Period of the Agricultural Competitiveness Enhancement Fund (ACEF)		
2016-05-23	10849	Renaming an Educational Institution : Romblon National Institute of Technology	Alcantara	Romblon
2016-05-23	10850	Creating a Regular District Office of the LTO	Baybay City	Leyte
2016-05-23	10851	Converting a National High School into a National Vocational High School : Judge Jose De Venecia, Sr. Technical-Vocational Secondary School	Dagupan	Pangasinan
2016-05-23	10852	Establishing a National High School : Santo Niño National High School	Parañaque City	NCR
2016-05-23	10853	Converting a High School Annex into an Independent National High School : Carugmanan National High School	Banisilan	Cotabato
2016-05-23	10854	Converting a High School Annex into an Independent National High School : Malinao National High School	Padada	Davao Del Sur
2016-05-23	10855	Converting a High School into a National High School : Irosin North National High School	Irosin	Sorsogon
2016-05-23	10856	Establishing a Marine Hatchery	Bantayan	Cebu
2016-05-23	10857	Establishing Mangrove Crab Seed Banks, Nurseries, and Grow-Out Production Farms	Virac, Bato, Baras, Gigmoto, Viga, Panganiban, Bagamanoc, San Andres, Caramoran, Pandan	Catanduanes
2016-05-23	10858	Establishing a Marine Hatchery	Nasipit	Agusan Del Norte
2016-05-23	10859	Establishing a Marine Hatchery	Jose Dalman	Zamboanga Del Norte
2016-05-23	10860	Establishing a Marine Hatchery	Sultan Naga Dimaporo	Lanao Del Norte
2016-05-23	10861	Establishing a Provincial Fisheries and Aquatic Resources Training, Development and Production Center		Leyte, Southern Leyte, Biliran, Eastern Samar, Northern Samar, Samar
2016-05-25	10862	Nutrition and Dietetics Law of 2016		
2016-06-10	10863	Customs Modernization and Tariff Act (GMTA)		
2016-06-10	10864	Amending the National Internal Revenue Code of 1997 or RA 8424 : Defining Raw Sugar or Raw Cane Sugar		
2016-06-23	10865	Converting a Regional Hospital into a Medical Center : Mayor Hilarion A. Ramiro, Sr. Medical Center	Ozamiz City	Misamis Occidental
2016-06-23	10866	Batanes Responsible Tourism Act		Batanes
2016-06-23	10867	National Bureau of Investigation Reorganization and Modernization Act		
2016-06-23	10868	Centenarians Act of 2016		
2016-06-29	10869	JobStart Philippines Act		
2016-07-17	10870	Philippine Credit Card Industry Regulation Law		
2016-07-17	10871	Basic Life Support Training in Schools Act		
2016-07-17	10872	Converting a High School Annex into an Independent National High School : Cordon National High School	Cordon	Isabela
2016-07-17	10873	Converting a High School Annex into an Independent National High School : Talifugo National High School	Conner	Apayao
2016-07-17	10874	Converting a High School Annex into an Independent National High School : Tanglagan National High School	Calanasan	Apayao
2016-07-17	10875	Establishing a National Science and Technology High School : Antipolo City National Science and Technology High School	Antipolo	Rizal
2016-07-17	10876	Converting a High School Annex into an Independent National High School : Tinglayan National High School	Tinglayan	Kalinga
2016-07-17	10877	Converting a High School Annex into an Independent National High School : Inil U. Taha National High School	Brooke's Point	Palawan
2016-07-17	10878	Amending the Agricultural Land Reform Code or RA 3844 : Institutionalizing Direct Credit Support of the Land Bank of the Philippines to Agrarian Reform Beneficiaries, Small Farmers, and Fisherfolk		
2016-07-17	10879	MIMAROPA Act	Calapan	Mindoro Oriental, Mindoro Occidental, Marinduque, Romblon, Palawan
2016-07-17	10880	Creating an additional Branch of the Regional Trial Court	Calapan	Oriental Mindoro
2016-07-17	10881	Amending Investment Restrictions in Specific Laws Governing Adjustment Companies, Lending Companies, Financing Companies, and Investment Houses		
2016-07-17	10882	Amending the AFP Military Personnel Retirement and Separation Decree of 1979 or PD 1638 : AFP Derivative Retirement Pension for Children/Survivors Act of 2016		
2016-07-17	10883	New Anti-Carnapping Act of 2016		
2016-07-17	10884	Amending the Urban Development and Housing Act of 1992 of RA 7279 : Balanced Housing Development Program Amendments Act		
2016-07-17	10885	Radio and Television Broadcasting Franchise : Makining Network, Inc		
2016-07-17	10886	Radio and Television Broadcasting Franchise Renewal : Kalayaan Broadcasting System, Inc		Agusan Del Norte, Agusan Del Sur, Bukidnon, Compostela Valley, Cotabato, Davao Del Norte, Davao Del Sur, Davao Occidental, Davao Oriental, Lanao Del Norte, Lanao Del Sur, Maguindanao, Misamis Occidental, Misamis Oriental, Sarangani, South Cotabato, Sultan Kudarat, Surigao Del Norte, Surigao Del Sur, Zamboanga Del Norte, Zamboanga Del Sur, Zamboanga Sibugay, Basilan, Camiguin, Dinagat Islands, Sulu, Tawi-Tawi
2016-07-17	10887	Radio and Television Broadcasting Franchise Renewal : Byers Communications, Inc		
2016-07-17	10888	Radio and Television Broadcasting Franchise Renewal : Zoe Broadcasting, Inc		
2016-07-17	10889	Telecommunications Franchise Renewal : Corona International, Inc		
2016-07-17	10890	Electric Power Distribution Franchise : Mactan Electric Company, Inc (MECO)	Lapu-Lapu City, Cordova	Cebu
2016-07-21	10891	Electric Power Distribution Franchise : First Bay Power Corp. (FBPC)	Bauan	Batangas
2016-07-21	10892	Electric Power Distribution Franchise Renewal : Ibaan Electric Corporation	Ibaan	Batangas
2016-07-21	10893	Radio and Television Broadcasting Franchise Renewal : Masbate Community Broadcasting Co., Inc.		Masbate, Romblon, Aklan, Antique, Capiz, Guimaras, Iloilo, Negros Occidental, Bohol, Cebu, Negros Oriental, Siquijor, Biliran, Leyte, Southern Leyte, Eastern Samar, Northern Samar, Samar
2016-07-21	10894	Telecommunications Franchise Renewal : Philippine Telegraph and Telephone Corporation (PT&T)		
2016-07-21	10895	Telecommunications Franchise : Avocado Broadband Telecoms, Inc.		
2016-07-21	10896	Radio and Television Broadcasting Franchise Renewal : People's Broadcasting Service, Inc		
2016-07-21	10897	Telecommunications Franchise : AMA Telecommunications, Inc		
2016-07-21	10898	Telecommunications Franchise : Infinivan, Inc.		
2016-07-21	10899	Radio and Television Broadcasting Franchise : Veritas Media Arts, Inc.		Bohol, Aklan, Antique, Capiz, Guimaras, Iloilo, Negros Occidental, Cebu, Negros Oriental, Siquijor, Biliran, Leyte, Southern Leyte, Eastern Samar, Northern Samar, Samar
2016-07-21	10900	Telecommunications Franchise Renewal : Bell Telecommunication Philippines, Inc		
2016-07-21	10901	Air Transport Franchise for Domestic and international Service : Pilipinas Asian Pearl Airways, Inc		
2016-07-21	10902	Telecommunications Franchise : Metro Connections and Telecom Corp.		
2016-07-21	10903	Telecommunications Franchise : Megamanila Telecom Corp.		
2016-07-21	10904	Radio and Television Broadcasting Franchise : Pilipinas Radio Waves Corp		
2016-07-21	10905	Closed Captions Requirement in Television on Television Stations and Television Programs Producers		
2016-07-21	10906	Anti-Mail Order Spouse Act : Repealing the Anti-Mail Order Bride Lawor RA 6955		
2016-07-21	10907	Camiguin Tourism Development Act		Camiguin
2016-07-21	10908	Integrated History Act of 2016		
2016-07-21	10909	No Shortchanging Act of 2016		
2016-07-21	10910	Amending the Anti-Graft and Corrupt Practices Act : Increasing the Prescriptive Period for Violations of the Act from 15 Years to 20 Years		
2016-07-21	10911	Anti-Age Discrimination in Employment Act		
2016-07-21	10912	Continuing Professional Development Act of 2016		
2016-07-21	10913	Anti-Distracted Driving Act		
2016-07-21	10914	Granting Citizenship to a Person		
2016-07-21	10915	Philippine Agricultural and Biosystems Engineering Act of 2016		
2016-07-21	10916	Road Speed Limiter Act of 2016		
2016-07-21	10917	Amending RA 9547 amendments to the Special Program for Employment of Students Actor RA 7323		
2016-07-21	10918	Philippine Pharmacy Act : Repealing the Pharmacy Lawor RA 5921		
2016-07-21	10919	University of Science and Technology of Southern Philippines (USTSP) Act		Misamis Oriental, Misamis Occidental
2016-07-21	10920	Converting a High School Annex into an Independent National High School : Cupis National High School	Conner	Apayao
2016-07-21	10921	Converting a High School Annex into an Independent National High School : Ili National High School	Conner	Apayao
2016-07-22	10922	Economic and Financial Literacy Act		
