= Binibining Pilipinas 2012 =

49th Binibining Pilipinas pageant

- Date: April 15, 2012
- Presenters: Xian Lim; Iza Calzado; Venus Raj; Georgina Wilson
- Entertainment: Arnel Pineda; Bamboo; Callum David
- Venue: Smart Araneta Coliseum, Quezon City, Metro Manila, Philippines
- Broadcaster: ABS-CBN; The Filipino Channel
- Entrants: 30
- Placements: 12
- Winner: Janine Tugonon; Bataan
- Congeniality: Chloe Zanardi; Marikina
- Best National Costume: Nicole Schmitz; Cebu City
- Photogenic: Karen Gallman; Ubay, Bohol

Binibining Pilipinas 2012 was the 49th edition of the Binibining Pilipinas pageant, held at the Smart Araneta Coliseum in Quezon City, Metro Manila, Philippines, on April 15, 2012.

At the end of the event, Shamcey Supsup crowned Janine Marie Tugonon as Miss Universe Philippines 2012, Dianne Elaine Necio crowned Nicole Cassandra Schmitz as Binibining Pilipinas International 2012, and Isabella Angela Manjon crowned Katrina Jayne Dimaranan as Binibining Pilipinas Tourism 2012. Elaine Kay Moll was named 1st Runner-Up, and Annalie Forbes was named 2nd Runner-Up.

Later that year, Elaine Kay Moll was appointed as Binibining Pilipinas Supranational 2012. On the following year, Annalie Forbes was appointed as Binibining Pilipinas Grand International 2013.

== Results ==
Color keys

- The contestant was a Runner-up in an International pageant.
- The contestant was a Semi-Finalist in an International pageant.

Placement	Contestant	International Placement
Miss Universe Philippines 2012	Bb. #18 – Janine Marie Tugonon	1st Runner-Up – Miss Universe 2012
Binibining Pilipinas International 2012	Bb. #8 – Nicole Cassandra Schimtz	Top 15 – Miss International 2012
Binibining Pilipinas Tourism 2012	Bb. #13 – Katrina Jayne Dimaranan	Did not compete
1st Runner-Up	Bb. #15 – Elaine Kay Moll (Appointed as Binibining Pilipinas Supranational 2012)	3rd Runner-Up – Miss Supranational 2012
2nd Runner-Up	Bb. #29 – Annalie Forbes (Appointed as Binibining Pilipinas Grand International 2013)	3rd Runner-Up – Miss Grand International 2013
Top 12	Bb. #1 – Karen Juanita Gallman; Bb. #7 – Patricia Lae Ejercitado; Bb. #9 – Mary Jean Lastimosa; Bb. #14 – Gina Joy Howell; Bb. #16 – Liezl Alcantara; Bb. #26 – Angelee Claudette delos Reyes; Bb. #30 – Sherlyn Gonzales	

=== Special awards ===
Award	Contestant	Ref.
Bb. Best in National Costume	Bb. #8 – Nicole Cassandra Schmitz	
Bb. Friendship	Bb. #25 – Chloe Zanardi	
Bb. Talent	Bb. #13 – Katrina Jayne Dimaranan	
Bb. Manila Bulletin Readers' Choice Award	Bb. #20 – Roxanne Tadique	
Bb. People's Choice Award	Bb. #21 – Giselle Angelica Muñoz	
Bb. Best in Swimsuit	Bb. #8 – Nicole Cassandra Schmitz	
Bb. Photogenic	Bb #1 Karen Juanita Gallman	
Bb. Philippine Airlines	Bb. #9 – Mary Jean Lastimosa	
Bb. Avon Philippines	Bb. #9 – Mary Jean Lastimosa	
Bb. Best in Long Gown	Bb. #26 – Angelee Claudette delos Reyes	

== Judges ==
- H.E. Jorge Domecq – Ambassador of Spain to the Philippines
- Ashley Ferguson – Director of Commercial Marketing for Avon Southeast Asia
- Richard Gomez – Movie and TV Personality, Athlete
- Olivier Gougeon – CEO of Société Générale Private Banking South Asia
- Risa Hontiveros-Baraquel – Former Akbayan Partylist Representative
- John Martin Miller – Chairman and CEO of Nestlé Philippines
- Cesar Purisima – Secretary of the Department of Finance
- Precious Lara Quigaman – Miss International 2005, Movie and TV Personality, Freelance Writer
- Jose Manuel Romualdez – Publisher and CEO of People Asia Magazine
- H.E. Harry K. Thomas, Jr. – Ambassador of the United States to the Philippines
- Casimiro Ynares, III – Governor of Rizal
- Phil Younghusband – Forward for the Philippine national football team

== Contestants ==
30 contestants competed for the three titles.

No.	Contestant	Age (Note: Ages at the time of the pageant)	Hometown
1	Karen Juanita Gallman	19	Ubay
2	Romelin Roxane de Castro	20	Taguig
3	Nicole Marable	17	Quezon City
4	Jaine Hidalgo	25	Naga
5	Rose Ann Aguilar	24	Cavite
6	Maria Alicia Elena Ariosa	24	Pagadian
7	Patricia Lae Ejercitado	23	Cainta
8	Nicole Cassandra Schmitz	23	Cebu City
9	Mary Jean Lastimosa	24	Davao City
10	Jillean Camille Orbina	20	Cordon
11	Marie Virgenia Cecilie Peter	21	Kalibo
12	Ayelee Marie Dasalla	21	Mariveles
13	Katrina Jayne Dimaranan	18	San Juan
14	Gina Joy Howell	20	Angeles City
15	Elaine Kay Moll	20	Northern Samar
16	Liezl Alcantara	19	Batanes
17	Anna Czarina Buenviaje	19	Malinao
18	Janine Marie Tugonon	23	Bataan
19	Roxane Joy Jesalva	19	Daraga
20	Roxanne Tadique	25	Quezon City
21	Giselle Angelica Muñoz	25	Parañaque
22	Meiji Cruz	18	Valenzuela
23	Goldy Baroa	23	Laguna
24	Fer Mary Baliquig	20	Tagbilaran
25	Chloe Zanardi	24	Marikina
26	Angelee Claudette delos Reyes	24	Olongapo
27	Golda Mae Soller	25	Roxas
28	Marie Irisha Arcenas	21	Cebu
29	Annalie Forbes	19	Malolos
30	Sherlyn Gonzales	24	Ilocos Sur

== Notes ==
=== Post-pageant notes ===
- Janine Tugonon competed at Miss Universe 2012 in Las Vegas, Nevada and was named First Runner-Up. On the other hand, Nicole Schmitz competed at Miss International 2012 in Okinawa and was one of the fifteen semifinalists.
- Katrina Dimaranan did not compete internationally in 2012 due to the Miss Tourism Queen International 2012 pageant, which supposedly was set in China, was cancelled due to undisclosed reasons. In 2018, Dimaranan was appointed as Miss Supranational USA 2018 and represented the United States at Miss Supranational 2018. She finished as 1st Runner-Up and won the Best Body Figure Award. Dimaranan then competed at Miss Universe Philippines 2021 representing Taguig wherein she finished as Miss Universe Philippines Tourism 2021.
- Elaine Kay Moll was appointed as Binibining Pilipinas Supranational 2012 and competed at Miss Supranational 2012. Moll finished as 3rd Runner-Up. On the other hand, Annalie Forbes was appointed as Binibining Pilipinas Grand International 2013 and competed at Miss Grand International 2013 where she finished as 3rd Runner-Up.
- Angelee delos Reyes competed again at Miss Philippines Earth where she was crowned as Miss Philippines Earth 2013. She competed at Miss Earth 2013 in Muntinlupa where she finished as one of the eight finalists. Delos Reyes also won the Miss Eco Tourism and the Miss Fitflop awards.
- Mary Jean Lastimosa competed for the third time at Binibining Pilipinas 2014 and was crowned Binibining Pilipinas Universe 2014. She competed at Miss Universe 2014 in Doral where she finished as a Top 10 finalist.
- Karen Gallman competed again at Binibining Pilipinas 2018 and was crowned Binibining Pilipinas Intercontinental 2018. She competed at Miss Intercontinental 2018 and won.
