= Aces and Queens =

Philippine beauty camp

- Company type: Private company
- Industry: Beauty camp
- Founded: 2001
- Headquarters: Makati, Metro Manila, Philippines
- Key people: Jonas Gaffud; Mad Bronce
- Owner: Jonas Gaffud (2001–2019); Gerry Diaz (2019–present)

Aces & Queens is a Philippine beauty camp that provides training and coaching to beauty pageant contestants. According to ABS-CBN, mentorship offered by camps such as Aces and Queens and Kagandahang Flores, another center offering pageant training, was credited for the successes of Filipino candidates in international beauty contests since 2010.

== Background and formation ==
From 1970s until 1980s, pageant candidates did not go through training camps to prepare for international competitions. As contests became more competitive in the 1990s and 2000s, local bets attended pageant training that was held abroad like the ones that were run in Colombia and Venezuela. Before Venus Raj won a runner-up place in Miss Universe 2010, no Philippine contestants reached the pageant's semifinal round.

Founders Jonas Gaffud and Nad Bronce persuaded then student Zorayda Ruth Andam in 2001 to participate in the Binibining Pilipinas. Gaffud and Bronce soon were joined by film director Jeffrey Jeturian and Arnold Mercado, and they formed a group called Mabuhay Beauties. When it expanded, it was then known by its current name.

== Candidates ==
The camp helped the campaigns of Filipino candidates in international pageants such as Andam, Gionna Cabrera, Lia Ramos, Miss Universe 2015 Pia Wurtzbach, Miss World 2013 Megan Young, Miss Universe 2013 3rd runner-up Ariella Arida, Miss Universe 2012 1st runner-up Janine Tugonon, Miss World 2011 1st runner-up Gwendoline Ruais, Miss Universe 2011 3rd runner-up Shamcey Supsup, and Miss Universe 2010 4th runner-up Venus Raj. Trainings, which are held in Pasig and Mandaluyong, included physical fitness, make-up, fashion, and communication skills.

Some candidates have transferred to other training camps as with Mary Jean Lastimosa, who transferred from Aces & Queens to Kagandahang Flores in 2014.

== Impact ==
According to Agence France Presse, the rise of boot camps dedicated to beauty pageant preparations had helped in making the Philippines "a beauty pageant superpower." However, pageants were reportedly criticized as outdated and a form of objectification of women.

In particular, the camp received disapproval for providing training to foreign candidates, particularly that of Miss Universe Indonesia Kezia Warouw. Gaffud stated in an interview that Warouw's coaching consisted a "pep talk" and a favor to Albert Kurniawan, a mentor who had been giving free make-up tutorials to trainees. Additionally, Lastimosa's transfer to Kagandahang Flores allegedly caused a rift among founders of the two camps, although such transfers were commonplace and previously attracted little attention. Aces & Queens was also reportedly persuading candidates to switch to attend its program in a bid to attract potential winners. Gaffud refuted the claim as not true and blamed social media for triggering "camp wars".
