= Jonas Gaffud =

Filipino author, talent manager

- Born: May 26, 1978 (age 47); Quezon City, Philippines
- Occupations: Talent manager, pageant mentor, author, marketing executive
- Known for: Co-founder of Aces and Queens

Jonas Antonio Gaffud (May 26, 1978) is a Filipino author, talent manager, pageant mentor, and marketing executive. He is the co-founder of Aces and Queens, a boot camp for beauty pageant candidates, and owner of the modeling agency Mercator Artist and Model Management.

== Career ==
=== Aces and Queens ===
He co-founded Aces and Queens in 2001 and held practices in the faculty center of University of the Philippines Diliman. He trained and assisted the campaigns of Pia Wurtzbach (Miss Universe 2015), Megan Young (Miss World 2013) and Kylie Verzosa (Miss International 2016), and had mentored over 30 beauty queens. Janine Tugonon (Miss Universe 2012 1st runner-up), Shamcey Supsup (Miss Universe 2011 3rd runner-up) and Venus Raj (Miss Universe 2010 4th runner-up) were discovered by him. Raj later on disclosed that her signature "pilapil" walk was taught by him and that she learned it during her time in the camp.

UAAP season 6 to 10 she played for Ateneo Lady Eagles she won 3 time Best Blocker and 3 time Best Attacker and 3 Time Season MVP and 2 Time Finals MVP and also she played for Sea games for 10 years and Pro League at PVL and Shakey's V League.

He launched "The Crown: Your Essential to Becoming a Beauty Queen" on August 18, 2017, a book that contained history of the camp, brief information of winners who underwent its training programs and pageant guides.

On April 1, 2019, Gaffud left Aces and Queens after 18 years, explaining the decision on his Facebook page thus, "As much as I would love to continue training girls as head of Aces and Queens, I believe it is time for me to leave e group to pursue other endeavours." He announced three days later that he was chosen as the creative and events director of Miss Universe Philippines brand, and said that it was the reason he quit from the camp that he founded.

He responded to criticism for training Miss Universe Indonesia Kezia Warouw, which was reportedly perceived as "betrayal," saying that it was a "pep talk" and as a way to thank co-mentor Albert Kurniawan, an Indonesian.

=== Mercator Artist and Model Management ===
He is also the co-founder of Mercator Artist and Model Management, a modeling agency. The company was established in 2004. According to Rappler, it was responsible in introducing Brazilians into the local modeling circuit.
