= MassKara Festival Queen 2012 =

MassKara Festival Queen 2012 was the 32nd edition of the MassKara Festival Queen pageant held on October 18, 2012, at the University of St. La Salle Gymnasium in Bacolod City, Philippines. Ena Louis Velasco, a 4th year BS Biology of University of St. La Salle was crowned at the end of the event.

== Final results ==
Placement	Name	School
Masskara Festival Queen 2012	Ena Louis Velasco	University of St. La Salle
1st Runner Up	Samyah Al-Dossary	University of St. La Salle
2nd Runner Up	Tanya Molenaar	University of St. La Salle

== Special awards ==
Special Award	Winner
Best in Evening Gown	Ena Louis Velasco
Best Festival Costume	Ena Louis Velasco
Miss Boracay Newcoast	Ena Louis Velasco
Best in Swimsuit,	Tanya Molenaar
Best in Ramp	Tanya Molenaar
Miss Jor Travel and Tours	Tanya Molenaar
Best in Talent	Dominique Abayon
Miss Congeniality	Kris Ann Marie Dumancas
Best in Make-up	Kris Ann Marie Dumancas
Miss Photogenic	Kris Piamor Gicaro
Ms. 2Go Princess	Ena Louis Velasco
Ms. SM	Daphne Tanya Molenaar
Ms. Sta. Barbara Heights	Kris Gicaro
Ms. Slenda	Mara Delaminez
Ms. Lifestyles Bacolod Readers’ Choice	Danielle Villaflor
Ms. Merci	Danielle Villaflor

== Contestants ==
Name	Age	School	Course
Danielle Villaflor			
Daphne Tanya Molenaar	17	University of St. La Salle	5th Year
Dominique Abayon		Riverside College	
Ena Louis Velasco	20	University of St. La Salle	Biology
Kris Ann Marie Dumancas		University of St. La Salle	Nursing Graduate
Kris Piamor Gicaro		Riverside College	Mursing
Mara Delaminez			
Samyah Al-Dossary	17	University of St. La Salle	AB Interdisciplinary Studies

== Other Pageant Notes ==
=== Judges ===
- Patricia Tumulak - Binibining Pilipinas 2011 Semi-Finalist, and Miss Philippines Earth 2009 Miss Fire
- Maggie Limjap - Former Beauty Queen
- Harold Geronimo - Director of Strategic Marketing and Communications of Megaworld Corporation
- Alex Gonzales Soncio - Chairman; Miss Iloilo Dinagyang
- Ivy Visitacion - lifestyle Columnist - Visayan Daily Star
- Rene Hinojales - Director - Lin-ay sang Negros
- Jed Patrick Mabilog - Mayor - Iloilo City
- Agrimero Cruz - Regional Director - Western Visayas Police Office

=== Pre-and-Post Pageant Notes ===
- Tanya Molenaar was Miss World Philippines 2012 contestant.
- Samyah Al-Dossary went on to represent Bacolod City in Lin-ay sang Negros 2013 and was crowned the winner.

== See also ==
- MassKara Festival
