= Binibining Pilipinas 2010 =

47th Binibining Pilipinas pageant

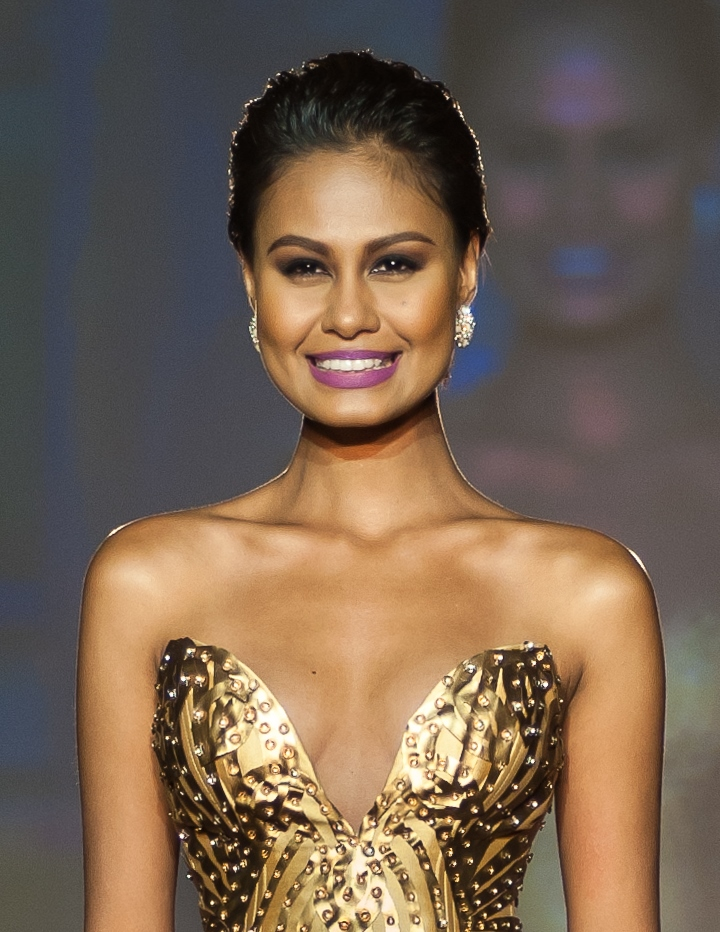
- Venus Raj, Binibining Pilipinas Universe 2010
- Date: March 6, 2010
- Presenters: Dingdong Dantes; Carla Abellana
- Entertainment: Arnel Pineda; Journey
- Venue: Smart Araneta Coliseum, Quezon City, Metro Manila, Philippines
- Broadcaster: GMA Network; GMA Pinoy TV
- Entrants: 24
- Placements: 10
- Winner: Maria Venus Raj; Bato, Camarines Sur
- Congeniality: Maria Venus Raj; Bato, Camarines Sur; Princess Kate Alimurong; Pampanga
- Photogenic: Helen Nicolette Henson; Pampanga

Binibining Pilipinas 2010 was the 47th edition Binibining Pilipinas. It took place at the Smart Araneta Coliseum in Quezon City, Metro Manila, Philippines on March 6, 2010.

At the end of the event, Bianca Manalo crowned Venus Raj as Binibining Pilipinas Universe 2010, Marie-Ann Umali crowned Czarina Gatbonton as Binibining Pilipinas World 2010, and Melody Adelheid Gersbach crowned Krista Kleiner as Binibining Pilipinas International 2010. Dianne Necio was named 1st Runner-Up and Helen Nicolette Henson was named 2nd Runner-Up.

This is also the last year of the Miss World Philippines title to be under Binibining Pilipinas after the franchise of Miss World Philippines was transferred to the Miss World Philippines Organization.

== Results ==
Color keys

- The contestant was a Runner-up in an International pageant.
- The contestant was a Semi-Finalist in an International pageant.
- The contestant did not place.

Placement	Contestant	International Placement
Binibining Pilipinas Universe 2010	Bb. #10 – Maria Venus Raj	4th Runner-Up – Miss Universe 2010
Binibining Pilipinas World 2010	Bb. #21 – Czarina Catherine Gatbonton	Unplaced – Miss World 2010
Binibining Pilipinas International 2010	Bb. #11 – Krista Eileen Kleiner	Top 15 – Miss International 2010
1st runner-up	Bb. #2 – Dianne Elaine Necio	
2nd runner-up	Bb. #18 – Helen Nicolette Henson	
Top 10	Bb. #1 – Mariella Castillo; Bb. #13 – Gwendoline Gaelle Sandrine Ruais; Bb. #14 – Mary Ann Ross Misa; Bb. #17 – Rose Ann Aguilar; Bb. #19 – Kate Princess Alimurong	

=== Special awards ===
Award	Candidate(s)
Best in Philippine Terno	Bb. #10 –Maria Venus Raj
Miss Talent	Bb. #11 – Krista Eileen Kleiner
Miss Friendship	Bb. #10 – Maria Venus Raj; Bb. #19 – Kate Princess Alimurong
Miss Photogenic	Bb. #18 – Helen Nicolette Henson
Best in Swimsuit	Bb. #11 – Krista Eileen Kleiner
Best in Long Gown	Bb. #10 – Maria Venus Raj
Miss Fit ‘n Right	Bb. #18 – Helen Nicolette Henson
Miss PAL Sunniest Personality	Bb. #18 – Helen Nicolette Henson
Miss Texters Choice Award	Bb. #7 – Laurese Ann Caparas
Araneta Center Shopper's Choice Award	Bb. #4 – Selena Alexis Antonio
Manila Bulletin Reader's Choice Award	Bb. #21 – Czarina Catherine Gatbonton

== Judges ==
- H.E. Thierry Borja de Mozota – Ambassador of France to the Philippines
- H.E. Ivan J. Crespo – Ambassador of Panama to the Philippines
- Mike Enriquez – Filipino journalist, GMA-7 news anchor
- Juvenal Sanso – Painter
- Aurora Pijuan – Miss International 1970
- Claudine Barretto – Movie and television actress
- Nonito Donaire – WBA Interim World Super Flyweight Champion
- Gabe Norwood – Professional basketball player
- Jaime Bautista – President and Chief Operating Staff of Philippine Airlines Inc.
- Goran Aleksandrovski – General Manager of Sofitel Philippine Plaza
- Vice Admiral Ferdinand Golez – 30th Flag Officer in Command of the Philippine Navy

== Contestants ==
24 contestants competed for the three titles.

No.	Contestant	Age (Note: Ages at the time of the pageant)	Hometown
1	Mariella Castillo	18	Batangas
2	Rachel Ann Bustamante	17	Oriental Mindoro
3	Patrixia Sherly Santos	17	Bicol Region
4	Selena Alexis Antonio	23	Pasig
5	Yazmin Nicole Kaufmann	24	Taguig
6	Patricia Lae Ejercitado	21	Cainta
7	Laurese Ann Caparas	17	Hagonoy
8	Anna Marie Morelos	20	Valenzuela
9	Laica Joy Jimenez	20	Bustos
10	Maria Venus Raj	21	Bato
11	Krista Eileen Kleiner	20	Quezon City
12	Reina Mae Maerina	24	Lipa
13	Gwendoline Gaelle Sandrine Ruais	20	Muntinlupa
14	Mary Ann Ross Misa	21	Parañaque
15	Jam Charish Libatog	22	Cebu City
16	Toni Alyessa Hipolito	20	Quezon City
17	Rose Ann Aguilar	22	Cavite
18	Helen Nicolette Henson	21	San Fernando
19	Kate Princess Alimurong	22	Bacolor
20	Marie Ysabelle Matubis	22	Parañaque
21	Czarina Catherine Gatbonton	19	Malolos
22	Dianne Elaine Necio	17	Albay
23	Mhirra Hernandez	20	Santa Maria
24	Angelica Damian	23	Baliuag

== Notes ==
=== Post-pageant notes ===
- On March 29, 2010, less than a month after being crowned as Binibining Pilipinas Universe 2010, Venus Raj was stripped off the aforementioned title due to inconsistencies with her birth certificate. The title was given to Helen Nicolette Henson, the 2nd Runner-Up, since Dianne Necio, the 1st Runner-Up, is not yet eligible to compete at Miss Universe due to being underage. However on April 10, 2010, Raj was allowed to reclaim her title as Binibining Pilipinas Universe 2010. Raj competed at Miss Universe 2010 in Las Vegas, Nevada and was named 4th Runner-Up.
- Czarina Gatbonton competed at Miss World 2010 in Sanya, China but was unplaced. After her stint in Miss World, Gatbonton competed at Miss Humanity International 2011 in Barbados where she was named 2nd Runner-Up. She also won the Best in Talent Award and the Humanitarian Queen for Asia-Pacific title.
- Krista Kleiner competed at Miss International 2010 in Chengdu, China and was one of the fifteen semifinalists. She also won the Miss Talent and Miss Expressive awards.
- Dianne Necio competed again at Binibining Pilipinas 2011 and won Binibining Pilipinas International 2011. She competed at Miss International 2011 in Chengdu, China and was one of the fifteen semifinalists. She also won the Miss Internet Popularity award.
- Both Gwendoline Ruais and Helen Nicolette Henson competed at Miss World Philippines 2011. Henson was named 1st Runner-Up while Ruais won the Miss World Philippines 2011 title. Ruais competed at Miss World 2011 in London and was named 1st Runner-Up.
