= Binibining Pilipinas 2011 =

48th Binibining Pilipinas pageant

- Date: April 10, 2011
- Presenters: Derek Ramsay; KC Concepcion; Lara Quigaman; Miriam Quiambao
- Entertainment: Matteo Guidicelli; Sam Milby; Marie Digby; Sitti; Princess Velasco; Karylle
- Venue: Smart Araneta Coliseum, Quezon City, Metro Manila, Philippines
- Broadcaster: ABS-CBN; The Filipino Channel
- Entrants: 40
- Placements: 15
- Winner: Shamcey Supsup; General Santos
- Congeniality: Samantha Neville Purvor; Quezon City
- Best National Costume: Elizabeth Clenci; Nasipit, Agusan del Norte
- Photogenic: Angelia Gabrena Ong; Iloilo City

Binibining Pilipinas 2011 was the 48th edition of Binibining Pilipinas. It was held at the Smart Araneta Coliseum in Quezon City, Metro Manila, Philippines on April 10, 2011.

At the end of the event, Venus Raj crowned Shamcey Supsup as Miss Universe Philippines 2011, Krista Kleiner crowned Dianne Necio as Binibining Pilipinas International 2011, and Czarina Gatbonton crowned Isabella Angela Manjon as Binibining Pilipinas Tourism 2011. Janine Marie Tugonon was named 1st Runner-Up and Mary Jean Lastimosa was named 2nd Runner-Up.

Starting this edition, the winners of Binibining Pilipinas will represent the Philippines in Miss Universe, Miss International, and Miss Tourism Queen International after losing its franchise for Miss World.

== Results ==
Color keys

- The contestant was a Runner-up in an International pageant.
- The contestant was a Semi-Finalist in an International pageant.
- The contestant did not place.

Placement	Contestant	International Placement
Miss Universe Philippines 2011	Bb. #26 – Shamcey Supsup	3rd Runner-Up – Miss Universe 2011
Binibining Pilipinas International 2011	Bb. #33 – Dianne Elaine Necio	Top 15 – Miss International 2011
Binibining Pilipinas Tourism 2011	Bb. #25 – Isabella Angela Manjon	Unplaced – Miss Tourism Queen International 2011
1st runner-up	Bb. #27 – Janine Marie Tugonon	
2nd runner-up	Bb. #34 – Mary Jean Lastimosa	
Top 15	Bb. #6 – Patricia Marie Tumulak; Bb. #8 – Maria Kristina Marasigan; Bb. #11 – Diana Arevalo; Bb. #13 – Queenierich Rehman; Bb. #16 – Sabrinne Al-Tawil; Bb. #19 – Wendy Lucas; Bb. #23 – Luzelle Felipe; Bb. #30 – Kathleen Subijano; Bb. #32 – Jenn-Roe Gubat; Bb. #37 – Sarah Nicole Clenci	

=== Special awards ===
Award	Contestant	Ref.
Miss Friendship	Bb. #31 – Samantha Neville Purvor	
Miss Talent	Bb. #26 – Shamcey Supsup	
Miss Philippine Airlines	Bb. #26 – Shamcey Supsup	
Manila Bulletin Readers' Choice Award	Bb. #23 – Luzelle Felipe	
Miss Creamsilk	Bb. #26 – Shamcey Supsup	
Best in Swimsuit	Bb. #13 – Queenierich Rehman	
Best in Long Gown	Bb. #23 – Luzelle Felipe	
Face of Bb. Pilipinas 2011	Bb. #7 – Angelia Gabrena Ong	
Best in National Costume	Bb. #2 – Elizabeth Clenci	

== Judges ==
- Alex Cabagnot – Point Guard for San Miguel Beermen
- David Charlton – President and CEO of David's Salon, Inc.
- H.E. Hans Dannenberg – Non-Resident Ambassador of the Dominican Republic to the Philippines, Ambassador of the Dominican Republic in India
- Silvana Fornari – Wife of H.E. Luca Fornari, Ambassador Extraordinary and Plenipotentiary of the Embassy of the Republic of Italy
- Sec. Edwin Lacierda – Presidential Spokesperson
- Ernie Lopez – President and Founder of ABS-CBN Publishing, Triathlete
- Margie Moran-Floirendo – Miss Universe 1973, Managing Director of Pearl Farm Beach Resort Davao
- Cristino “Bong” Naguiat, Jr. – Chairman and CEO of Philippine Amusement and Gaming Corporation
- Gen. Eduardo Oban, Jr. – Chief of Staff of the Armed Forces of the Philippines
- Charo Santos-Concio – President and COO of ABS-CBN Corporation, Movie and TV Producer, Actress and TV Host
- Gilbert Simpao – Managing Director for Unilever Philippines – Hair Care and Skin Care Category
- Hugh Wilson – Consul General of the Embassy of Australia, Dean of the Consular Corps of the Philippines
- Anthony Charlemagne Yu – President and CEO of Megaworld Central Properties, Inc. and Empire East Holdings

== Contestants ==
Forty contestants competed for the three titles.

No.	Contestant	Age (Note: Ages at the time of the pageant)	City/Province	Notes
1	Zephorah Mayon	20	Cavite	Previously Mutya ng Pilipinas 2007 but abdicated her title
2	Elizabeth Clenci	20	Nasipit	Later became Binibining Pilipinas Grand International 2017; Later placed 2nd runner-up at Miss Grand International 2017
3	Carolyn Ty	24	Mandaluyong	Top 10 semi-finalist at Mutya ng Pilipinas 2010
4	Gianna Therese Quintos	24	San Juan	
5	Jennielyn Natividad	22	Quezon City	Previously placed 2nd runner-up at Mutya ng Pilipinas 2009
6	Patricia Marie Tumulak	23	Quezon City	Previously Miss Philippines Fire 2009
7	Angelia Gabrena Ong	20	Iloilo City	Later became Miss Philippines Earth 2015; Later became Miss Earth 2015
8	Maria Kristina Marasigan	22	Batangas City	
9	Bernadette Mae Aguirre	18	Bulacan	Later became Miss Philippines Eco Tourism 2013
10	Hazelyn Santos	22	Ilocos Sur	
11	Diana Arevalo	22	Calapan	Competed at Binibining Pilipinas 2014
12	Carla Marie Lacson	22	Quezon City	
13	Queenierich Rehman	22	Las Piñas	Later became Miss World Philippines 2012; Top 15 semi-finalist at Miss World 2012
14	Marish Alyssa Marquinez	21	Pampanga	
15	Arabella Hanesh	24	Pangasinan	Previously placed 2nd runner-up at Mutya ng Pilipinas 2005
16	Sabrinne Al-Tawil	21	Bacolod	
17	Gerlie Lero	17	Alimodian	
18	Teresa Pamela Ludovice	23	Albay	
19	Wendy Lucas	20	Isabela	
20	Jeanette Mieko Noguchi	23	Quezon City	
21	Kenneth Dimaapi	21	Bulacan	
22	Paula Camille Figueras	24	Marikina	
23	Luzelle Felipe	18	Bulacan	
24	Martha Chloe McCulley	24	Parañaque	
25	Isabella Angela Manjon	24	Pasig	Unplaced at Miss Tourism Queen International 2011
26	Shamcey Supsup	24	General Santos	Later placed 3rd runner-up at Miss Universe 2011
27	Janine Marie Tugonon	21	Bataan	Later became Miss Universe Philippines 2012; Later placed 1st runner-up at Miss Universe 2012
28	Joanna Tuazon	22	Bulacan	
29	Krystle Ann Grant	23	Pampanga	
30	Kathleen Subijano	23	Muntinlupa	
31	Samantha Neville Purvor	23	Quezon City	Top 12 semi-finalist at Miss World Philippines 2011
32	Jenn-Roe Gubat	20	Bulacan	Top 12 semi-finalist at Mutya ng Pilipinas 2009
33	Dianne Elaine Necio	19	Albay	Top 15 semi-finalist at Miss International 2011
34	Mary Jean Lastimosa	23	Cotabato	Top 15 semi-finalist at Binibining Pilipinas 2012; Later became Miss Universe Philippines 2014; Top 10 semi-finalist at Miss Universe 2014
35	Suzette Hernandez	25	Batangas	
36	Camille Alexis Baltazar	20	Parañaque	
37	Sarah Nicole Clenci	17	Nasipit	
38	Ladylyn Riva	23	Aklan	
39	Glennifer Perido	21	Laguna	
40	Monique Teruelle Manuel	22	Bataan	
