= Queenierich Rehman =

- Born: Queenierich Ajero Rehman; June 27, 1988 (age 38); Las Piñas, Metro Manila, Philippines
- Education: Assumption College San Lorenzo
- Height: 1.76 m (5 ft 9 1/2 in)
- Beauty pageant titleholder
- Title: Miss World Philippines 2012
- Hair color: brown
- Eye color: brown
- Major competitions: Binibining Pilipinas 2011 (Top 15) (Best in Swimsuit); Miss World Philippines 2012 (Winner); Miss World 2012 (Top 15) (Designer Award)

Queenierich Ajero Rehman (born 27 June 1988) is a Filipino-Pakistani singer, model and beauty pageant titleholder who was crowned Miss World Philippines 2012. She represented the Philippines at the Miss World 2012 pageant in Ordos, China and finished as a Top 15 semifinalist.

As Miss World Philippines 2012, Rehman drew worldwide attention for her beatboxing talent during her participation in the pageant.

== Early life and education ==
Rehman is of both Filipino and Pakistani descent. She finished her college education at the Assumption College San Lorenzo.

== Pageantry ==
=== Bb. Pilipinas 2011 ===
Rehman became popular in the Philippine pageant arena when she first joined Binibining Pilipinas 2011 where she was awarded Best in Swimsuit and finished in the Top 15. The eventual winner was (Miss Universe Philippines 2011), Shamcey Supsup.

=== Miss World Philippines 2012 ===
After her attempt in Bb. Pilipinas, Rehman competed the following year in the 2nd edition of Miss World Philippines pageant.

During the live final on 25 June 2012, Rehman was awarded seven out of the seventeen special awards including Best in Swimsuit, Most Photogenic and Miss Talent and at the conclusion of the event, she was crowned by outgoing Miss World Philippines 2011, Gwendoline Gaelle Sandrine Ramos Ruais and was awarded the honor of representing the Philippines at Miss World 2012.

On August 18, 2013, Rehman crowned Megan Young as her successor at the Miss World Philippines 2013 pageant held at the Solaire Resort & Casino in Parañaque, Philippines.

=== Miss World 2012 ===
Rehman arrived in Ordos City in China on 19 July 2012 to begin vying for the Miss World crown together with 115 other delegates.

Over the duration of the pageant, Rehman was tapped as one of clear frontrunners along with Australia's Jessica Kahawaty, South Sudan's Atong Demach, and Mexico's Mariana Berumen.

She also gained worldwide attention for her talent she showcased for the pageant which was beatboxing which landed her in the websites of the Huffington Post and Time.

Ultimately, she placed in the Top 15, placing 8th behind Miss World 2012, Yu Wenxia of China.

Awards and achievements
Preceded by Gwendoline Ruais (Muntinlupa)	Miss World Philippines; 2012	Succeeded by Megan Young (Olongapo)
