= Gwendoline Ruais =

Filipino-French beauty pageant winner

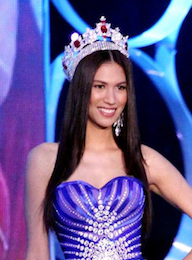
- Ruais in 2012
- Born: Gwendoline Gaelle Sandrine Ramos Ruais; December 11, 1989 (age 36); Muntinlupa, Metro Manila, Philippines
- Citizenship: Philippines; France
- Education: University of Sunderland
- Height: 5 ft 11 in (1.80 m)
- Beauty pageant titleholder
- Title: Miss World Philippines 2011
- Hair color: Black
- Eye color: Brown
- Major competitions: Binibining Pilipinas 2010 (Top 10); Miss World Philippines 2011 (Winner); Miss World 2011 (1st Runner-Up)

Gwendoline Gaelle Sandrine Ramos Ruais (Tagalog pronunciation: [ɾuˈwɛɪ̯]; French pronunciation: [ʁɥɛ]; born December 11, 1989) is a Filipino-French actress, model, TV presenter and beauty pageant titleholder who was crowned Miss World Philippines 2011. She represented the Philippines at the Miss World 2011 pageant in London, England and placed 1st Runner-Up.

== Biography ==
Ruais was born to a French father and a Filipino mother. She has a Business Management Honors degree from Sunderland University. Ruais has an elder sister who is also a beauty queen, Gwennaelle Ruais, who competed in Miss Philippines Earth 2010 and finished as the 3rd Runner-Up. Both sisters are granddaughters of Pierre Ruais, who was the mayor of Paris in 1956 and 1957.

== Pageantry ==
=== Binibining Pilipinas 2010 ===
Ruais first joined Binibining Pilipinas 2010 and placed as a top 10 semifinalist. The eventual winners were (Binibining Pilipinas International 2010) Krista Kleiner, (Binibining Pilipinas World 2010) Czarina Gatbonton, and (Binibining Pilipinas Universe 2010) Venus Raj.

=== Miss World Philippines 2011 ===
Ruais joined the first edition of CQGQ's Miss World Philippines in 2011 where she was victorious. She was crowned by Miss World 2010 Alexandra Mills in the Philippine International Convention Center in Pasay on 18 September 2011. She represented the Philippines in the Miss World 2011 pageant.

On June 24, 2012, Ruais crowned Queenierich Rehman as her successor at the Miss World Philippines 2012 pageant held at the Manila Hotel in Manila, Philippines.

=== Miss World 2011 ===
In the Miss World finals night, Ruais was crowned as the 1st Runner-Up, with Ivian Sarcos of Venezuela being crowned as the winner. This was the Philippines' highest placement in Miss World since Evangeline Pascual placed as 1st runner-up in 1973 and Ruffa Gutierrez, who placed as 2nd runner-up in 1993.

== Career ==
After Miss World 2011, Ruais became a regular performer at Party Pilipinas and a host for Unang Hirit on GMA Network in 2012. She then went on to be a host and judge on the reality show Gusto Ko Maging Beauty Queen (I want to be a beauty queen) and continued with various stints on TV shows and movies.

After winning in the international pageant, the Miss World Organization called her back to be the pageant reporter for the Miss World 2013 in Bali.

She has hosted the Miss World Philippines pageant every year. In addition to the televised event, her role includes training the candidates in walking, presentation, and interview techniques.

=== Asia's Next Top Model ===
In 2016, Ruais was chosen as one of the final fourteen contestants for the fourth season of Asia's Next Top Model. During her stay on the show, Ruais was heavily criticized for her background in pageantry. She was originally eliminated during the show's first episode, but was allowed to remain in the competition. She became the fourth eliminated.

== Filmography ==
=== Television ===
Year	Program	Role	Network/Studio
2012-13	Party Pilipinas	Co-host/performer	GMA Network
2012	Unang Hirit	Co-host	GMA Network
2012	A Secret Affair	Wedding Planner	Viva Films
2013	Gusto Kong Maging Beauty Queen	Host	Studio 23
2013	Miss World 2013	Pageant reporter/host	GMA Network
2014	Sunday All Stars	Performer	GMA Network
2016	Asia's Next Top Model	Contestant (season 4)	Star World
2018	Tadhana	Julien	GMA Network
2021	Le Meilleur Pâtissier	Contestant (season 10)	M6

Awards and achievements
Preceded by (Botswana) Emma Wareus	Miss World (1st Runner-Up); 2011	Succeeded by (Wales) Sophie Moulds
Preceded by (China) Tang Xiao	Miss World Asia & Oceania; 2011	Succeeded by (China) Yu Wenxia
Preceded by Czarina Gatbonton (Malolos)	Miss World Philippines; 2011	Succeeded by Queenierich Rehman (Las Piñas)
