= MassKara Festival Queen 2015 =

MassKara Queen 2015 was the 35th edition of the MassKara Festival Queen pageant was held on October 12, 2015 at SMX Convention Center in SM City Bacolod in Bacolod City, Philippines. Sam Gergiana Yu, a Bachelor of Secondary Education major in Mathematics major, was crowned by the outgoing winner Christine Joy Madamba at the end of the event.

== Final results ==
Placement	Name	School
Masskara Queen 2015	Sam Gergiana Yu	University of St. La Salle
1st Runner Up	Kennyveb Casabuena	Bacolod City College
2nd Runner Up	Ivy Benedicto	University of St. La Salle

== Special awards ==
Special Award	Winner
Best in Evening Gown	Mae Lourine Mercado
Best Festival Costume	Jennifer Agudelo
Ms Block and White	Ronilyn Baloco
Best in Swimwear	Sam Gergiana Yu
Miss Advocacy	Mae Alyn Marzan
Best in Talent	Mae Lourine Mercado
Miss Congeniality	Rezel Esporas
Ms Alta Essencia	Aniara Faduhilao
Miss Photogenic	Kennyveb Casabuena
Ms. 2Go Supercat	Mae Lourine Mercado
Ms. Darling of the Press	Kennyveb Casabuena
Ms. Miss Kokuryu Beauty and Butter	Sam Gergiana Yu
Ms. Gluta	Sam Gergiana Yu
Ms Eskinol	Ronilyn Baloco
Ms. Merci	Sam Gergiana Yu
Ms. Masskara Rotary Advocacy	Sam Gergiana Yu
Ms. Delaram-Karat World	Sam Gergiana Yu
Ms. Flawless	Kennyveb Casabuena
Ms. Forest Park	Kennyveb Casabuena
Ms. Pioneer Insurance	Kennyveb Casabuena
Ms. Camella Homes	Mae Lourine Mercado
Miss Sisters	Mae Lourine Mercado
Miss Sophie	Mae Lourine Mercado

== See also ==
- MassKara Festival Queen
- MassKara Festival
