= Irene Gabriel =

Irene Gabriel may refer to:

- Irene Gabriel, character in Drive (2011 film)
- Irene Gabriel, contestant in Miss World Philippines 2011
