= MassKara Festival Queen 2011 =

MassKara Festival Queen 2011 was the 31st edition of the MassKara Festival Queen pageant held on October 17, 2011, at the University of St. La Salle Gymnasium in Bacolod City, Philippines. Alexis Danica Drilon, a 4th year BS Biology of University of St. La Salle was crowned by Bacolod City Mayor Evelio "Bing" Leonardia at the end of the event.

== Final results ==
Placement	Name	School
Masskara Festival Queen 2011	Alexis Danica Drilon	University of St. La Salle
1st Runner Up	Jelliane Dinorog	Colegio San Agustin - Bacolod
2nd Runner Up	Alyssa Villarico	UNO-R

== Special awards ==
Special Award	Winner
Miss Samsung	Alexis Danica Drilon
Miss Photogenic	Alexis Danica Drilon
Best in Festival Costume	Alexis Danica Drilon
Miss Supercat	Alexis Danica Drilon
Best in Fantasy Make-up	Alexis Danica Drilon
Lifestyle's Bacolod Choice	Alexis Danica Drilon
Miss Casino Alcohol Femme	Alyssa Villarico
Best in Ramp	Alyssa Villarico
Best in Talent	Jelliane Dinorog
Miss Congeniality	Kathleen Matillano
Best in Swimsuit	Rose Valerie Lapuz

== Contestants ==
Name	Age	School	Course
Abegail Rose Valdez	19	University of Negros Occidental Recoletos	Nursing
Alexis Danica Drilon	20	University of St. La Salle	Biology
Alona Jabaybay	19	University of Negros Occidental Recoletos	Accountancy
Alyssa Villarico	19	University of Negros Occidental Recoletos	
Anastacia Concepcion	18	West Negros University	Hospitality Management
Giah Elaine Sumalde	20	University of St. La Salle	Interdisciplinary Studies
Jelliane Dinorog		Colegio San Agustin - Bacolod	Secondary Education
Kathleen Matillano	17	Luisa Medel National High School	
Rose Valerie Lapuz	20	University of Negros Occidental Recoletos	Hotel and Restaurant Management
Rexie Lynn Lim	19	University of St. La Salle	Nursing

== Judges ==
- Odette Velarde - Samsung
- Rene Hinojales - Choreographer
- Dr. Kristine Varona-Yap - Masskara Festival Queen 1998
- Ramon Cua Locsin - Former Iloilo City Councilor
- Ryan Gamboa - ABS-CBN Bacolod news anchor
- Jewel Mae Lobaton-Pimentel - Masskara Festival Queen 1993, Binibining Pilipinas-Universe 1998

== See also ==
- MassKara Festival
