= Mary Jean Lastimosa =

Filipina beauty queen, engineer, actress, host, and television presenter (born 1987)

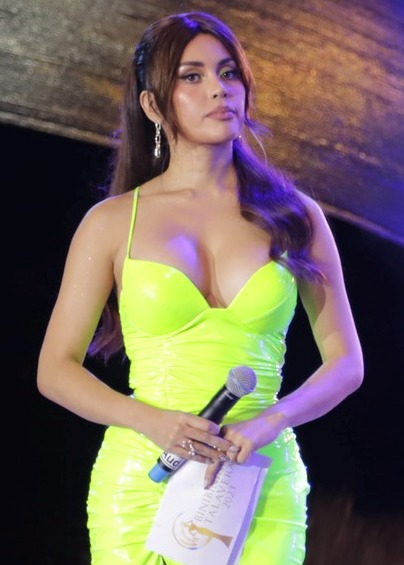
- Lastimosa in 2023
- Born: Mary Jean Ramirez Lastimosa; November 23, 1987 (age 38); Tulunan, Cotabato, Philippines
- Other name: MJ Lastimosa
- Education: University of Mindanao (Computer engineering)
- Height: 5 ft 7 in (170 cm)
- Beauty pageant titleholder
- Title: Miss Universe Philippines 2014
- Major competitions: Binibining Pilipinas 2011; (2nd Runner-Up); Binibining Pilipinas 2012; (Top 12); (Miss Philippine Airlines); (Miss Avon Philippines); Miss Asia Global 2012; (Top 10); Binibining Pilipinas 2014; (Winner – Miss Universe Philippines 2014); (Best in Swimsuit); Miss Universe 2014; (Top 10)

Mary Jean Ramirez Lastimosa (Tagalog pronunciation: [lɐstɪˈmɔsɐ]; born November 23, 1987) is a Filipino beauty pageant titleholder and actress who won Miss Universe Philippines 2014. She represented the Philippines at Miss Universe 2014 and placed in the Top 10.

== Early life and education ==
Mary Jean Ramirez Lastimosa was born to a Saudi father and a Filipino mother. She finished her Computer Engineering degree with honors at the University of Mindanao in Davao City.

== Pageantry ==
Lastimosa competed in local pageants, winning Davao’s Loveliest in 2005, Mutya ng University of Mindanao in 2006, Miss Regional and Miss National PRISAA in 2007, and again Mutya ng Davao and Reyna ng Aliwan in 2008 prior to winning Binibining Pilipinas.

=== Binibining Pilipinas 2011 ===
In 2011, Lastimosa was second runner-up at Binibining Pilipinas 2011. Shamcey Supsup won the pageant.

=== Binibining Pilipinas 2012 ===
In 2012, Lastimosa reached the top 12 at Binibining Pilipinas 2012, and also won the Miss Philippine Airlines and Miss Avon Philippines awards. Janine Tugonon won the said pageant.

=== Binibining Pilipinas 2014 ===
Lastimosa entered Binibining Pilipinas 2014 and won the title of Miss Universe Philippines 2014, gaining the right to represent the Philippines at Miss Universe 2014.

During the question and answer portion of the pageant, she was asked by Miss Universe 2013, Gabriela Isler: "March is the women’s month. For you, what is the greatest advantage of being a woman?" She replied:

The greatest advantage of being a woman is being able to compose herself. Just like here, we're standing in front of thousands of people, not knowing if you're going to cheer for us or boo us. But we try to compose ourselves. We keep the emotions and show the beauty that is in us and tonight, thousands of people are standing here, celebrating the beauty of women."

At the end of the event, she was crowned as Miss Universe Philippines 2014, and received the Best in Swimsuit award.

On March 15, 2015, Lastimosa crowned Pia Wurtzbach as her successor at Binibining Pilipinas 2015, held at the Smart Araneta Coliseum in Quezon City, Philippines.

=== Miss Universe 2014 ===
Lastimosa competed in Miss Universe 2014 in Doral, Florida, United States, and finished in the top 10. Paulina Vega of Colombia won the said pageant.

=== Mister Grand International ===
In November 2024, Lastimosa became international director for the Mister Grand International pageant.

== Filmography ==
=== Film ===
Year	Title	Role
2025	Call Me Mother	herself

=== Television ===
Year	Title	Role
2012–2013	Be Careful with My Heart	Katherine
2015	Maalaala Mo Kaya: Takure	Herself
2015	Luv U	Mary Jean Patrimonio
2019	Manilennials	Valerie Alvero
2019–2020	Story of My Life	Veronica/Ronnie
2021	Tadhana: Ambisyon	Sandra
2022	Daddy's Gurl	Mary Jo Espinoza
2022	Agimat ng Agila	Rosebud/Garote
2022	Regal Studio Presents She Likes Me, Likes Me Not	Dee
2022	Happy Together	Jonabelle
2022	Oh My Korona	Bituin
2023	Open 24/7	Brenda
2024	Abot-Kamay na Pangarap	Claire Bermudez
2024	Regal Studio Presents Pares Queens Overload	Gloria Ruiz

Awards and achievements
Preceded by Ariella Arida (Alaminos, Laguna)	Miss Universe; Philippines; 2014	Succeeded by Pia Wurtzbach (Cagayan de Oro)
Preceded by Helen Nicolette Henson (San Fernando, Pampanga)	Binibining Pilipinas (2nd Runner-Up); 2011	Succeeded by Annalie Forbes (Malolos, Bulacan)
