= Francis Libiran =

Filipino fashion designer

- Born: Philippines
- Education: Fashion Institute of the Philippines; University of Santo Tomas
- Occupation: Fashion designer
- Years active: 1998–present
- Notable work: Hello Kitty Couture Collection, Creatures of the Night Collection, Sinag Barong for 2024 Olympics
- Website: francislibiran.com

Francis Libiran is a Filipino fashion designer, who had made clothing designs that have been worn by Hollywood celebrities and featured on America's Next Top Model. In 2024, he designed the Sinag Barong worn by Team Philippines at the Paris 2024 Olympics.

== Early life and education ==
Libiran was born in Metro Manila, Philippines. He comes from a wealthy and conservative family. He has five other siblings who would all pursue a career in medicine.

He first dabbled in fashion design at age eight, and often doodled gowns in secret, fearing his father might discover his LGBTQ identity. He remained closeted in his early years out of respect for his family. Libiran credits his mother Rebecca's fashion sense as his earlier influence in taking up fashion design. He often accompanied his mother to the seamstress.

He pursued a career in architecture, attending the University of Santo Tomas. He is an architecture board exam passer and briefly worked as a draftsman for an architecture firm. He later shifted to fashion design. This career change was met with resistance from his father at first.

He obtained his degree in Fashion Design at the Fashion Institute of the Philippines. He set up a small atelier in 1998, marking the start of his fashion design career.

== Career ==
=== America's Next Top Model ===
The producers of America's Next Top Model and host Tyra Banks commissioned Libiran to be a featured designer in the 18th season of the show. Libiran created the Hello Kitty Couture Collection for an episode of the show which aired in April 2012. Libiran was further commissioned by Tyra to design several custom pieces for her to wear, which landed her on "best dressed" lists of various red carpets, specifically the Blossom Ball.

=== Encantadia ===
In 2016, Libiran designed costumes for GMA's TV series Encatadia, where he did extensive research to come up with the designs. According to Libiran, his team brainstormed together with Encantadia's production team and watched old clips of Encantadia in YouTube to conceptualize the characters' fashion sense. The gowns of the sang'gres and Ynang Reyna is more edgy and fashionable compared to the ruggedness/cocky-themed costumes in 2005. Each gown depicts the powers and personalities of each sang'gre while showing one thing that they have in common- Royal. The colors of their gowns match the colors of the gems that the Sang’gres are guarding. Just like in the original series, they wore elegant gowns when they were not in a battle. He further stated, "A normal gown usually takes us two months to create but since we had to consider the time, we assigned a dedicated team of craftsmen to produce the outfits in just 15 days." According to the cast, they went on a strict diet and fitness trainings to secure their shape suited for their exquisite gowns. The cast first appeared in costumes during "ToyCon 2016 Poplife Fan Xperience" at the SMX Convention Center, Pasay on June 10, 2016.

"The process is the same as when we make our signature gowns for clients here and abroad. Since the designs I've made still include my signature details, it was not that hard for me and my team to create the costumes. The only difference is that we had to consider how these gowns would appear against chroma optical filters used in television as Encantadia is a telefantasia which requires chroma."

— Libiran, on how Encantadia costumes were made.

=== Inaul Reimagined ===
In 2026, Libaran posted the Inaul Reimagined series on social media where he showed his use of the Maguindanao textile Inaul in his design. He described his take as not preserving it but rather to "weaponize tradition". The Lanao del Sur office of the Bangsamoro Commission for the Preservation of Cultural Heritage called the post as disrespectful and Libaran's characterization of the Inaul as "deeply troubling". Libaran asked for an apology, took down the post, and reached out to the BCPCH.

=== Other clients ===
In 2011, Libiran designed the evening gown for Maria Paula Bianca Paz, who used it in competition at Miss World Philippines 2011. It won Best Evening Gown.

Libiran has designed clothes for various Hollywood celebrities such as Darren Criss, Billy Porter, Mena Massoud, Nikki Reed, Apl.de.ap, J. Rey Soul, Priyanka Chopra, Gwen Stefani, Mel B, Carson Kressley, Michaela Jaé Rodriguez, and Angela Bassett.

== Artistic influences ==
Francis' love for travel, nature, architecture, and patterns direct his designs. Some of his signature design techniques include art deco patterns and cutouts, custom laser-cut materials, intricate embellishments and custom embroidery.

== Personal life ==
Libiran is a gay man, coming out at age 20 when his fathered queried him about the nature of his relationship with his girlfriend at the time of two years. He is partnered with Florida native and businessman Christian Mark Jacobs with whom he entered in a relationship in 2014. They had a wedding ceremony in Boracay in 2017. They have two adopted sons. They were planning to formalize their union in the United States by 2018.
