= Sandra Daškova =

Estonian beauty pageant contestant

Sandra Daškova (born November 14, 1991, in Tallinn) is an Estonian model and beauty pageant titleholder. Sandra won the national contest which allowed her to participate in the Miss International 2011.
