= Dianne Necio =

Filipino beauty titleholder (born 1992)

- Born: Dianne Elaine Samar Necio; March 9, 1992 (age 34); Polangui, Albay, Philippines
- Height: 5 ft 6 in (1.68 m)
- Beauty pageant titleholder
- Title: Binibining Pilipinas International 2011
- Hair color: Black
- Major competitions: Binibining Pilipinas 2010; (1st Runner-Up); Binibining Pilipinas 2011; (Winner – Binibining Pilipinas International 2011); Miss International 2011; (Top 15)

Dianne Elaine Samar Necio (born March 9, 1992) is a Filipino model and beauty titleholder who represented the Philippines at the Miss International 2011 pageant. She was trained by beauty queen maker Rodgil Flores of Kagandahang Flores who also trained Miss International 2005, Precious Lara Quigaman. She topped the Online Voting and won the People's choice award. She was previously the 1st Runner-up in Binibining Pilipinas 2010.

== Pageants ==
Necio joined Binibining Pilipinas 2011 and won the Binibining Pilipinas International title during the coronation night held at the Araneta Coliseum on April 10, 2011.

This victory entitled her to represent the Philippines at the Miss International 2011 pageant held in Chengdu, China, on November 6, 2011. In the pageant Necio won the People's Choice Award.

Awards and achievements
Preceded by Krista Kleiner	Binibining Pilipinas International; 2011	Succeeded by Nicole Schmitz
