= MassKara Festival Queen =

Beauty pageant in Philippines

MassKara Festival Queen (now called Miss Bacolod MassKara) is a local beauty pageant in Bacolod, Negros Occidental, Philippines. Begun in 1981, it is one of the highlights of a week-long celebration called the MassKara Festival.

== List of titleholders ==
Year	Title	Name	School
1982	Miss MassKara 1982	Ma. Cecile Villacin	Bacolod City National High School
1983	Miss MassKara 1983		
1984			
1985			
1986			
1987	Miss MassKara 1987	Jeanett S.Yu	University of St. La Salle
1988	Miss MassKara 1988	Loretta Ramon	University of St. La Salle
1989	Miss MassKara 1989	Roselle Bernaje	
1990	Miss MassKara 1990	Catherine Orola	
1991	Miss MassKara 1991	Christine Tiongco	Riverside College
1992	Miss MassKara 1992	Vina Claudette Oca	
1993	Miss MassKara 1993	Jewel Mae Lobaton	University of St. La Salle
1994	MassKara Festival Queen 1994	Yrene Valenzuela	
1995	MassKara Festival Queen 1995	Carmela Arcolas	University of St. La Salle
1996	MassKara Festival Queen 1996	Monique Escalada	University of Negros Occidental-Recoletos
1997	MassKara Festival Queen 1997	Jona Jarder	University of St. La Salle
1998	MassKara Festival Queen 1998	Kristine Marie Varona	University of St. La Salle
1999	MassKara Festival Queen 1999–2001	Maria Althea Rose Mauricio	Riverside College
2000	Ms. Bacolod MassKara 2000	Lilian Marie Eusebio	University of St. La Salle
2001	Ms. Bacolod MassKara 2001	Normina Pangandaman	University of Negros Occidental-Recoletos
2002	MassKara Festival Queen 2002	Meg Urmeneta	
2003	MassKara Festival Queen 2003	Jan Nicole Puentevella	Riverside College
2004	MassKara Festival Queen 2004	April Tesorero	University of St. La Salle
2005	MassKara Festival Queen 2005	Charisse Gangoso	Colegio San Agustin - Bacolod
2006	MassKara Festival Queen 2006	Angelique Robles	
2007	MassKara Festival Queen 2007	Rosario Anne Sales	University of St. La Salle
2008	MassKara Festival Queen 2008	Jan Maricris Vega	
2009	MassKara Festival Queen 2009	Maria Aika Uy	Riverside College
2010	MassKara Festival Queen 2010	Agnes Therese Chang	
2011	MassKara Festival Queen 2011	Alexis Danica Drilon	University of St. La Salle
2012	MassKara Festival Queen 2012	Ena Louis Velasco	University of St. La Salle
2013	MassKara Festival Queen 2013	Lady Ann Alquizar	University of St. La Salle
2014	MassKara Festival Queen 2014	Christine Joy Madamba	University of St. La Salle
2015	MassKara Festival Queen 2015	Sam Gergiana Yu	University of St. La Salle
2016	MassKara Festival Queen 2016	Valerie Escamilla	John B. Lacson Colleges Foundation
2017	MassKara Festival Queen 2017	Fercy Lyn Almaiz	University of St. La Salle
2018	MassKara Festival Queen 2018	Ella Mae Mercado	Negros Occidental High School
2019	MassKara Festival Queen 2019	Trecia Tuquero	La Consolacion College
2020	MassKara Festival Queen 2020	Canceled due to COVID-19 restrictions	
2021	MassKara Festival Queen 2021	Cancelled due to COVID-19 restrictions	
2022	Miss Bacolod MassKara 2022	Kara Villarosa	Riverside College
2023	Miss Bacolod MassKara 2023	Yvonne Catamco	University of Saint La Salle Bacolod
2024	Miss Bacolod MassKara 2024	Princess Ella Olmilla	Colegio San Agustin - Bacolod
2025	Miss Bacolod MassKara 2025	Sophia Kaye Zaragoza	University of Saint La Salle Bacolod
2026	Miss Bacolod MassKara 2026	Macy Alaine E. Albarico	Barangay
2026	Miss Bacolod MassKara 2026	Macy Alaine E. Albarico	Singcang Airport
