= Mara La Torre =

Philippine fashion model

Mara Orendain La Torre
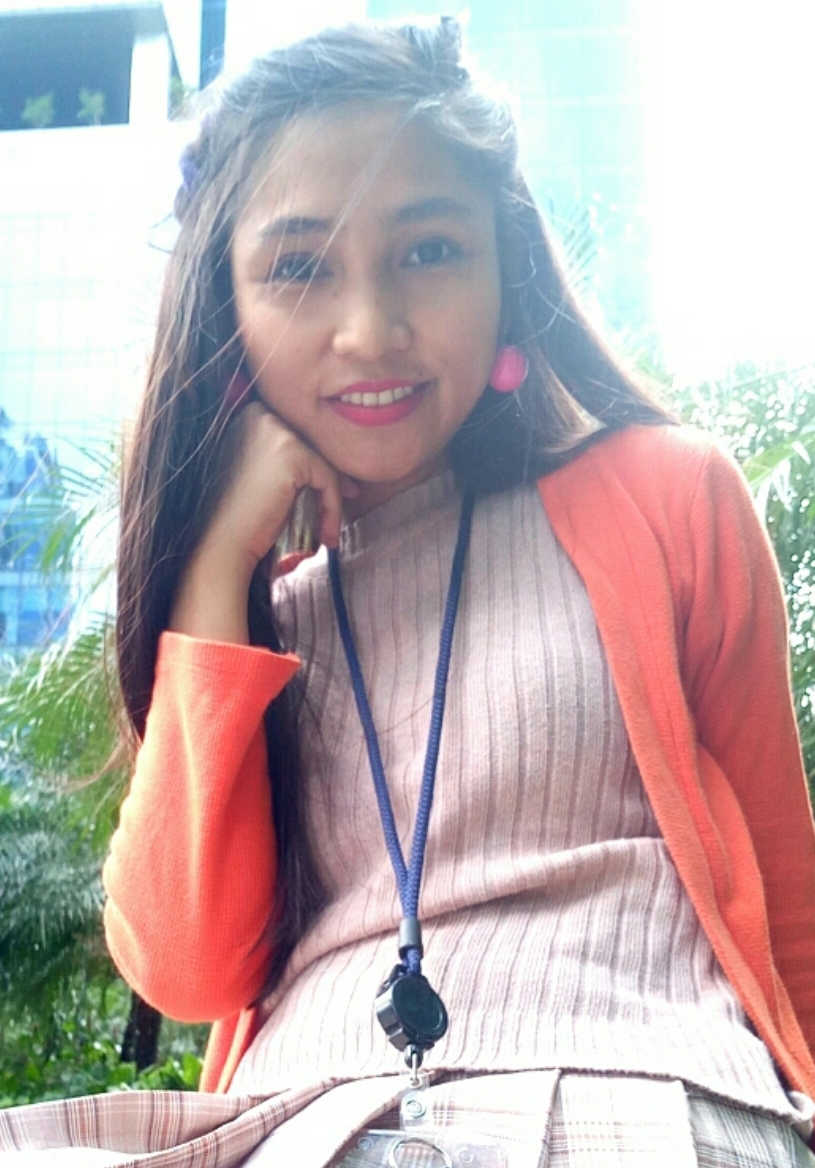
- Born: 1993 (age 32–33); Manila, Philippines
- Education: Bachelor of Arts in English Literature
- Occupation: Model
- Height: 5 ft 4 in (163 cm)

Mara Orendain La Torre (born 1993) is a Philippine fashion model. In 2021, she became the first transgender woman known to compete in the Miss Universe Philippines pageant.

She had previously gained media attention after filing charges due to being blocked from using the women's restroom at her workplace.

== Early life ==
La Torre was born in 1993 in Manila, Philippines. She had sex reassignment surgery before her rise to prominence in 2014.

== Bathroom lawsuit ==
In 2014, La Torre worked as a call center agent at a business process outsourcing company. That year, while working at Teleperformance, two security guards prevented her from using the women's restroom. She filed a lawsuit against them which gained media coverage in outlets such as GMA News, ABS-CBN News, and The Philippine Star. It was met with mixed reactions from the public.

After La Torre shared her discrimination experience on national news, 30 LGBTQ groups signed a solidarity statement with her. The case was reported in Fridae, The Windy City Times, and UPR Info.

The Gender-Fair Ordinance was enacted in Quezon City in 2014 to prohibit discrimination specific to the LGBTQ community.

Some universities in the Philippines installed third-gender bathrooms in 2014 such as St. Louis University in Baguio, Lyceum of the Philippines University, and Ateneo de Davao.

Since La Torre's case in 2014, other transgender women such as KaladKaren have shared their stories of being denied entry to clubs, bars, and other establishments.

Executive Director of EnGenderRights, Clara Rita Padilla who assisted La Torre with her lawsuit in 2014, cited the case in 2019 as the first success story, as it led to the building of the first all-gender restrooms in Quezon City even without national law.

== Miss Universe Philippines ==
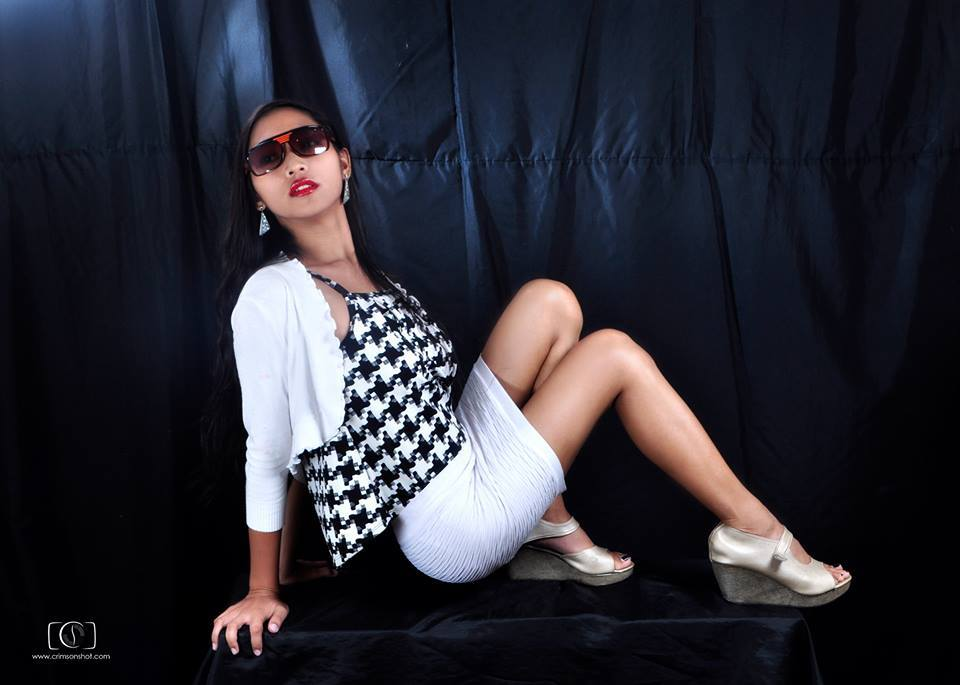
Mara La Torre as she appeared in Vice News.

In 2021, La Torre entered the Miss Universe Philippines pageant. She was asked to submit a medical certificate to prove that she was female after suspicion from the judges about her gender identity. When she went to be assessed, the male doctor who examined her sexually abused her. She was able to obtain the needed medical certificate, but during her screening, she was disqualified due to a male gender marker on her passport.

After the incident saw worldwide media attention, La Torre received hate messages and harassment. This led IMG Worldwide to pull its support of Miss Universe. IMG Worldwide sold Miss Universe to Thai transgender billionaire, Anne Jakrajutatip. Major donors removed their financial support, and Miss Universe filed for bankruptcy days before the pageant was set to occur.

La Torre paved the way for other transgender representation to join the Miss Universe Philippines pageant including Keylyn Trajano who made history when she joined the local franchise of Miss Universe Philippines in Pampanga.

== Filmography ==
=== Television ===
Year	Title	Role
2014	Failon Ngayon	Featured Guest
2014	Wish Ko Lang: Social Experiment	Featured Guest
