= Miss International 2011 =

Beauty pageant edition

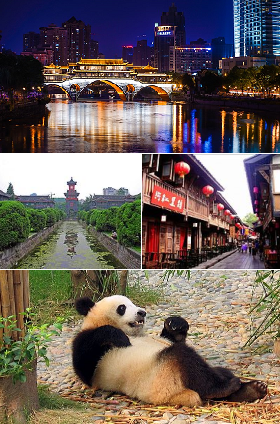
- Chengdu, China
- Date: 6 November 2011
- Venue: International Tennis Center, Chengdu, China
- Entrants: 67
- Placements: 15
- Debuts: Belize; Estonia; Zimbabwe
- Withdrawals: Bahamas; Canada; Chile; Czech Republic; Greece; Jamaica; Kenya; Lithuania; Martinique; Mauritius; Nicaragua; Norway; Serbia; Sri Lanka; United Kingdom
- Returns: Cuba; El Salvador; Honduras; Hungary; Kyrgyzstan; Portugal; Romania; Tanzania; Trinidad and Tobago
- Winner: Fernanda Cornejo; Ecuador

Miss International 2011 was the 51st Miss International pageant, held at the International Tennis Center in Chengdu, China, on 6 November 2011. Elizabeth Mosquera of Venezuela crowned her successor, Fernanda Cornejo of Ecuador, at the end of the event.

== Results ==
=== Placements ===
Placement	Contestant
Miss International 2011	Ecuador – María Fernanda Cornejo
1st Runner-Up	Venezuela – Jessica Barboza
2nd Runner-Up	Mongolia – Tugsuu Idersaikhan
3rd Runner-Up	Puerto Rico – Desirée Del Río
4th Runner-Up	Panama – Keity Drennan
Top 15	Brazil – Gabriella Marcelino; Latvia – Lelde Paulsone; Lebanon – Maria Farah; Netherlands – Talitha Hertsenberg; Philippines – Dianne Necio; Russia – Elena Chepilchenko; Sweden – Denice Andrée; Thailand – Kantapat Peerdachainarin; Trinidad and Tobago – Renee Bhagwandeen; Vietnam – Trương Tri Trúc Diễm

=== Special awards ===
Awards	Contestant
Miss Friendship	Hawaii – Shanna Nakamura; Mexico – Karen Higuera
Miss Photogenic	Venezuela – Jessica Barboza
Best in National Costume	Thailand – Kantapat Peerdachainarin
Miss Talent	China – Baixue Yuting
Miss Internet Popularity	Philippines – Dianne Necio
Miss Goodwill Ambassador	Aruba – Vivian Chow
Miss Panda Angel	Latvia – Lelde Paulsone
Miss Active	Puerto Rico – Desirée Del Río
Miss Expressive	Zimbabwe – Lisa Morgan
Miss Elegance	Russia – Elena Chepilchenko
Miss Beauty	Ecuador – María Fernanda Cornejo
Miss Stature	Ecuador – María Fernanda Cornejo

Order of Announcements

Top 15

1. Brazil
2. Netherlands
3. Latvia
4. Mongolia
5. Panama
6. Russia
7. Thailand
8. Philippines
9. Lebanon
10. Ecuador
11. Sweden
12. Vietnam
13. Venezuela
14. Puerto Rico
15. Trinidad and Tobago

Top 5

1. Panama
2. Venezuela
3. Ecuador
4. Puerto Rico
5. Mongolia

== Contestants ==
The Miss International 2011 contestants were:

Country/Territory	Contestant	Age	Height	Hometown	Continental Group
Aruba	Vivian Chow	19	1.73 m (5 ft 8 in)	Oranjestad	Americas
Australia	Brooke Nash	20	1.72 m (5 ft 7 1/2 in)	Mackay	Oceania
Belarus	Ulyana Volokhovskaya	18	1.81 m (5 ft 11 1/2 in)	Minsk	Europe
Belgium	Kristina De Munter	24	1.73 m (5 ft 8 in)	Caracas	Europe
Belize	Annlyn Apolonio	21	1.72 m (5 ft 7 1/2 in)	Belize City	Americas
Bolivia	Daniela Núñez del Prado	20	1.75 m (5 ft 9 in)	Santa Cruz	Americas
Brazil	Gabriella Marcelino	21	1.82 m (5 ft 11 1/2 in)	Simões Filho	Americas
China	Baixue Yuting	20	1.72 m (5 ft 7 1/2 in)	Zhengzhou	Asia
Colombia	Natalia Valenzuela	22	1.78 m (5 ft 10 in)	Neiva	Americas
Costa Rica	Amalia Matamoros	22	1.79 m (5 ft 10 1/2 in)	Naranjo	Americas
Cuba	Elizabeth Robaina	23	1.58 m (5 ft 2 in)	McAllen	Americas
Denmark	Monica Kristensen	20	1.77 m (5 ft 9 1/2 in)	Vejen	Europe
Dominican Republic	Catherine Ramírez	25	1.83 m (6 ft 0 in)	Santiago	Americas
Ecuador	María Fernanda Cornejo	22	1.78 m (5 ft 10 in)	Quito	Americas
El Salvador	Marcela Santamaría	19	1.74 m (5 ft 8 1/2 in)	San Salvador	Americas
Estonia	Sandra Daškova	19	1.75 m (5 ft 9 in)	Tallinn	Europe
Finland	Niina-Maria Lavonen	22	1.75 m (5 ft 9 in)	Pori	Europe
France	Laura Maurey	22	1.74 m (5 ft 8 1/2 in)	Bagnoles-de-l'Orne	Europe
Georgia	Ellen Sikorskaia	19	1.77 m (5 ft 9 1/2 in)	Tbilisi	Europe
Germany	Sandra Kaczmarczyk	22	1.71 m (5 ft 7 1/2 in)	Bonn	Europe
Guadeloupe	Daena Hatilip	25	1.73 m (5 ft 8 in)	Saint-Claude	Americas
Guam	Katarina Martinez	20	1.77 m (5 ft 9 1/2 in)	Barrigada Heights	Oceania
Guatemala	Karen Remón	21	1.78 m (5 ft 10 in)	Guatemala	Americas
Hawaii	Shanna Nakamura	24	1.55 m (5 ft 1 in)	Honolulu	Oceania
Honduras	Esthefany Pineda	18	1.70 m (5 ft 7 in)	Tela	Americas
Hong Kong	Whitney Hui	22	1.70 m (5 ft 7 in)	Fujian	Asia
Hungary	Nora Viragh	20	1.68 m (5 ft 6 in)	Mátészalka	Europe
India	Ankita Shorey	25	1.73 m (5 ft 8 in)	Jalandhar	Asia
Indonesia	Reisa Kartikasari	25	1.73 m (5 ft 8 in)	Yogyakarta	Asia
Italy	Anthea Lucà	19	1.80 m (5 ft 11 in)	Bazzano	Europe
Japan	Nagomi Murayama	23	1.67 m (5 ft 5 1/2 in)	Kanagawa	Asia
Kyrgyzstan	Asel Samakova	18	1.77 m (5 ft 9 1/2 in)	Bishkek	Asia
Latvia	Lelde Paulsone	22	1.72 m (5 ft 7 1/2 in)	Riga	Europe
Lebanon	Maria Farah	22	1.77 m (5 ft 9 1/2 in)	Windsor	Asia
Macau	Winnie Sin	24	1.68 m (5 ft 6 in)	Macau	Asia
Malaysia	Phong Sze Ling	21	1.70 m (5 ft 7 in)	Perak	Asia
Mexico	Karen Higuera	20	1.83 m (6 ft 0 in)	La Paz	Americas
Mongolia	Tugsuu Idersaikhan	19	1.81 m (5 ft 11 1/2 in)	Ulaanbaatar	Asia
Nepal	Sarina Maskey	24	1.73 m (5 ft 8 in)	Narayangad	Asia
Netherlands	Talitha Hertsenberg	19	1.81 m (5 ft 11 1/2 in)	Amsterdam	Europe
New Zealand	Claire Kirby	24	1.75 m (5 ft 9 in)	Palmerston North	Oceania
Panama	Keity Mendieta Britton	21	1.75 m (5 ft 9 in)	Panama City	Americas
Paraguay	Stephanía Vázquez Stegman	19	1.77 m (5 ft 9 1/2 in)	Asunción	Americas
Peru	María Alejandra Chávez	18	1.75 m (5 ft 9 in)	Lima	Americas
Philippines	Dianne Necio	19	1.68 m (5 ft 6 in)	Polangui	Asia
Poland	Adrianna Wojciechowska	25	1.79 m (5 ft 10 1/2 in)	Gostynin	Europe
Portugal	Patrícia Da Silva	21	1.77 m (5 ft 9 1/2 in)	Lisbon	Europe
Puerto Rico	Desirée Del Río	24	1.76 m (5 ft 9 1/2 in)	San Juan	Americas
Romania	Andrada Vilciu	25	1.75 m (5 ft 9 in)	Bucharest	Europe
Russia	Elena Chepilchenko	20	1.75 m (5 ft 9 in)	Saint Petersburg	Europe
Singapore	Stella Kae Sze Yun	22	1.71 m (5 ft 7 1/2 in)	Singapore	Asia
Slovakia	Dušana Lukáčová	20	1.70 m (5 ft 7 in)	Veľký Šariš	Europe
South Africa	Natasha Kashimoto	20	1.75 m (5 ft 9 in)	Benoni	Africa
South Korea	Kim Hye-sun	25	1.76 m (5 ft 9 1/2 in)	Seoul	Asia
Spain	Sarah Lopez Bujia	23	1.80 m (5 ft 11 in)	Santiago de Compostela	Europe
Sweden	Denice Andrée	23	1.78 m (5 ft 10 in)	Stockholm	Europe
Tahiti	Hitiana Monnier	23	1.76 m (5 ft 9 1/2 in)	Papeete	Oceania
Taiwan	Ying Kuei Li	20	1.77 m (5 ft 9 1/2 in)	Taipei	Asia
Tanzania	Nelly Kamwelu	19	1.74 m (5 ft 8 1/2 in)	Dar es Salaam	Africa
Thailand	Kantapat Peeradachainarin	25	1.75 m (5 ft 9 in)	Ratchaburi	Asia
Trinidad and Tobago	Renee Bhagwandeen	23	1.76 m (5 ft 9 1/2 in)	San Fernando	Americas
Turkey	Elif Korkmaz	21	1.78 m (5 ft 10 in)	İzmir	Europe
Ukraine	Oleksandra Kyrsha	23	1.75 m (5 ft 9 in)	Kyiv	Europe
United States	Kristen Little	23	1.75 m (5 ft 9 in)	Albuquerque	Americas
Venezuela	Jessica Barboza	24	1.74 m (5 ft 8 1/2 in)	Maracaibo	Americas
Vietnam	Trương Tri Trúc Diễm	24	1.74 m (5 ft 8 1/2 in)	Ho Chi Minh City	Asia
Zimbabwe	Lisa Morgan	21	1.75 m (5 ft 9 in)	Harare	Africa
