= Rodgil Flores =

Rodgil Flores is a Filipino beauty pageant mentor and events organizer. He is known as the founder of Kagandahang Flores, a boot camp for beauty pageant candidates.

== Background ==
Flores, a son of a politician, grew up in Pateros. In an interview that appeared in South China Morning Post, Flores stated that he was inspired with beauty pageants at seven years old during the 1974 staging of Miss Universe in the Philippines that was broadcast on live television. As a student, he pursued chemical engineering instead of becoming a make-up artist out of concern that his family would disapprove.

== Beauty camp ==
A candidate for a pageant in a local TV variety show was referred by a friend to be mentored by him in 1995. When she won, Flores, who was licensed engineer by profession, quit his job and established Kagandahang Flores (Flores Beauty) in 1996, the first local camp offering training for pageant candidates. He claimed that he mentors 250 to 300 women each year. As pageants were criticized for objectifying women, Flores said, "You have to be beautiful? Yes. But you should also have something inside that complements how you look."

Among the candidates he trained were Precious Lara Quigaman (Miss International 2005), Karla Henry (Miss Earth 2008), Bea Rose Santiago (Miss International 2013), Jamie Herrell (Miss Earth 2014), Angelia Ong (Miss Earth 2015), Karen Ibasco (Miss Earth 2017), Mary Jean Lastimosa (Miss Universe Philippines 2014, Miss Universe 2014 Top 10), Rachel Peters (Miss Universe Philippines 2017, Miss Universe 2017 Top 10) and Gazini Ganados (Miss Universe Philippines 2019, Miss Universe 2019 Top 20).

Foreign candidates who underwent his coaching were Miss International 2017 Kevin Lilliana of Indonesia and Miss Earth 2018 Nguyễn Phương Khánh of Vietnam. He received backlash for training women from other countries, an act deemed contradictory to the Filipino-first goal of the camp. In an interview, he stated that local candidates were a priority and said, “I’ll train other nationalities as long as our girls are not compromised.” He was also criticized for the transfer of Mary Jean Lastimosa from Aces & Queens, another beauty camp, which he admitted caused conflict between mentors of both camps.
