= Janine Tugonon =

Filipino model ang beauty pageant titleholder

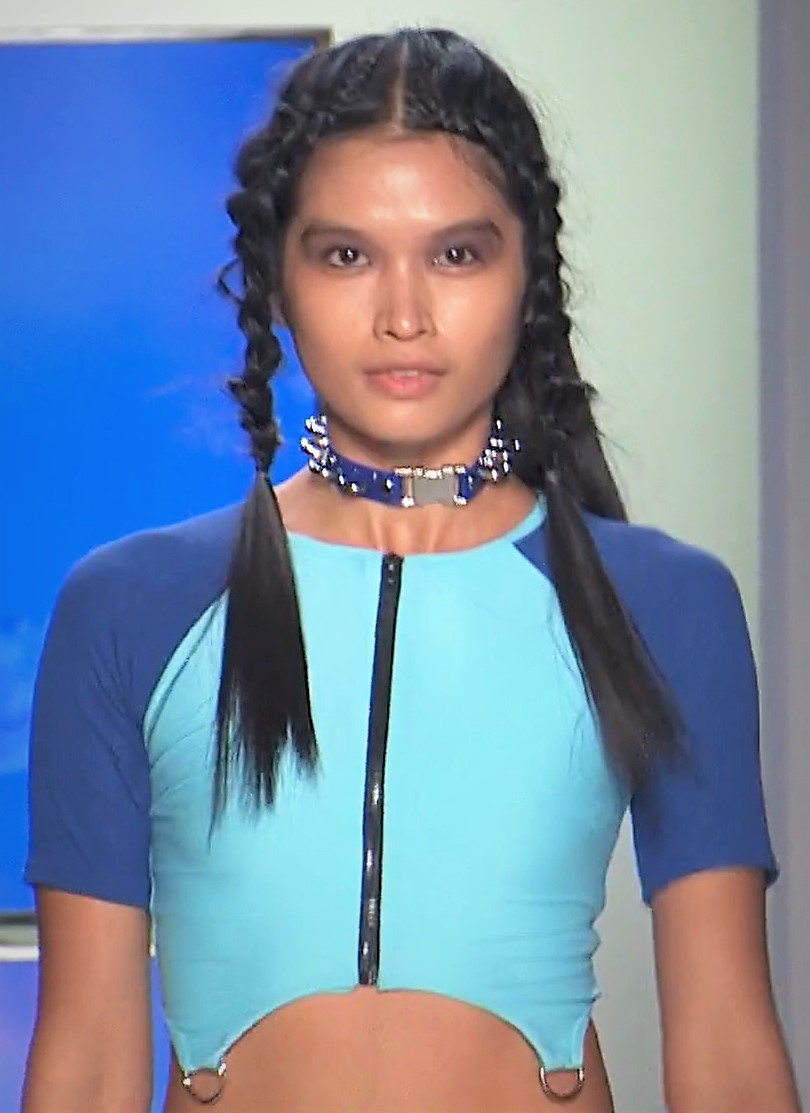
- Tugonon walking the runway in 2018
- Born: Janine Mari Raymundo Tugonon; October 19, 1989 (age 37); Balanga, Bataan, Philippines
- Education: University of Santo Tomas (Pharmacy)
- Height: 5 ft 8 in (1.73 m)
- Children: 1
- Beauty pageant titleholder
- Title: Miss Universe Philippines 2012
- Hair color: Black
- Eye color: Brown
- Major competitions: Binibining Pilipinas 2011; (1st Runner-Up); Binibining Pilipinas 2012; (Winner – Miss Universe Philippines 2012); Miss Universe 2012; (1st Runner-Up)

Janine Mari Raymundo Tugonon (Tagalog: [dʒɐˈnin tʊˈgɔnɔn]; born October 19, 1989) is a Filipino actress, TV host, model and beauty pageant titleholder who was crowned Miss Universe Philippines 2012. She represented the Philippines at the Miss Universe 2012 pageant, winning 1st runner up.

== Early life and education ==
Janine Mari Raymundo Tugonon was born and raised in Balanga, Bataan, Philippines. She finished her pharmacy degree with Latin honours (cum laude) at the University of Santo Tomas in Manila, and became a licensed pharmacist in June 2010.

== Pageantry ==
=== Binibining Pilipinas 2011 ===
In 2011, Tugonon placed 1st Runner-Up in the Binibining Pilipinas 2011 pageant. The eventual winner was Shamcey Supsup.

=== Binibining Pilipinas 2012 ===
In 2012, Janine once again joined the 49th edition of the Binibining Pilipinas pageant. During the question and answer round, she was asked: "Many women nowadays forego a happy family life for a successful career. How do you feel about this?" She responded:

"I believe that women have the right to choose between what they want. But for me, just go for what God wants you to do. Between the two, whatever it is, you must do what's your purpose in this world. Just have a child-like faith and mature obedience, and everything will go smooth."

At the end of the event, she won the title of Miss Universe Philippines 2012, gaining the right to represent the Philippines at the Miss Universe 2012 pageant.

On April 14, 2013, Tugonon crowned Ariella Arida as her successor at the Binibining Pilipinas 2013 pageant held at the Smart Araneta Coliseum in Quezon City, Philippines.

=== Miss Universe 2012 ===
On 19 December 2012, Tugonon competed in Miss Universe 2012 at the Planet Hollywood Resort and Casino in Las Vegas, United States where she finished 1st Runner-Up to Olivia Culpo of the USA. Tugonon was the only Asian to place in the Top 5. Philippines placed in the Top 5 for the third consecutive year.

During the final question and answer portion of the competition Tugonon was asked a question via Twitter and read by judge Nigel Barker: "As an international ambassador, do you believe that speaking English should be a prerequisite to being Miss Universe? Why or why not?" Tugonon replied:

"For me, being Miss Universe is not just about knowing how to speak a specific language – it is being able to influence and inspire other people. So whatever language you have, as long your heart is to serve and you have a strong mind to show to people, then, you can be Miss Universe."

At the end of the event, Tugonon finished as 1st Runner-Up, Olivia Culpo of United States won the said pageant. Tugonon is the second Filipina entrant at Miss Universe who finished as 1st runner-up after Miriam Quiambao in 1999. Tugonon's placement as 1st Runner-Up was the highest one of the Philippines at Miss Universe until the victories of Pia Wurtzbach's in 2015 and Catriona Gray in 2018.

== Modeling career ==
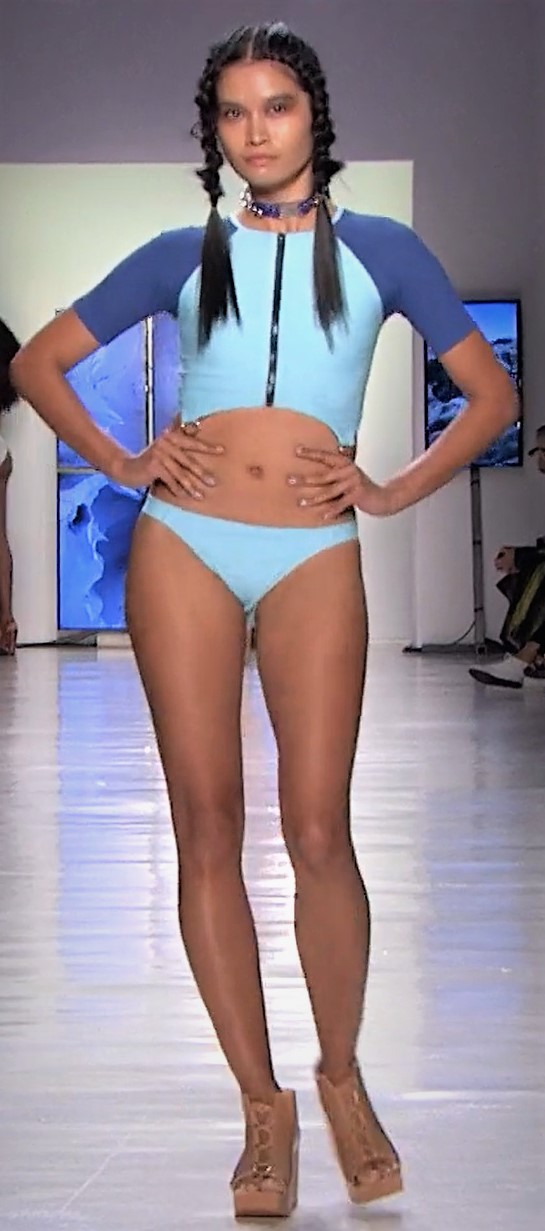
Tugonon modeling the Chromat Spring-Summer 2018 Serenity Collection at New York Fashion Week

=== 2012–2016: After Miss Universe 2012 and modeling career ===
After pageant, she graced to cover various Philippine-based magazines such as Preview, Metro, and FilJap Magazine, which eventually made it in international fashion industry. Tugonon is now living in the United States as she pursue her studies. She walked multiple fashion shows across America. Two of her biggest endorsements are Wells Fargo and Walmart. Her latest stint was on the newest commercial of Victoria's Secret Pink.

On January 8, 2016, Tugonon won the ₱1 million grand prize in the ABS-CBN game show Kapamilya Deal or No Deal, being the final winner before the show went for a ten-year hiatus before their revival in April 2026.

== Personal life ==
On October 30, 2024, Tugonon announced that she had given birth of her first child.

Awards and achievements
| Preceded by (Ukraine) Olesya Stefanko | Miss Universe (1st Runner-Up); 2012 | Succeeded by (Spain) Patricia Rodríguez |
| Preceded by Shamcey Supsup (General Santos) | Miss Universe Philippines; 2012 | Succeeded by Ariella Arida (Alaminos, Laguna) |
| Preceded by Dianne Necio (Albay) | Binibining Pilipinas (1st Runner-Up); 2011 | Succeeded by Elaine Moll (Northern Samar) |
