= Krista K =

Filipino-American beauty queen (born 1989)

Krista Kleiner
- Born: Krista Eileen Arrieta Kleiner; June 12, 1989 (age 37); Fullerton, California, U.S.
- Height: 1.73 m (5 ft 8 in)
- Beauty pageant titleholder
- Title: Binibining Pilipinas International 2010
- Major competitions: Binibining Pilipinas 2010 (Winner – Binibining Pilipinas International 2010); Miss International 2010 (Top 15) (Miss Talent) (Miss Expressive)
- Website: kristakleiner.com

Krista Eileen Arrieta Kleiner (born June 12, 1989) is a Filipino-American entertainer, creator and beauty pageant titleholder. She joined Binibining Pilipinas 2010 (Miss Philippines) and won Binibining Pilipinas-International 2010 (Miss Philippines International). She represented the Philippines in Miss International 2010 where she placed in the Top 15 finalists.

== Background ==
She joined the Binibining Pilipinas competition in 2010 (Miss Philippines). She won the competition and was awarded "Best in Swim Suit" and "Best in Talent".

She was invited by Julio Iglesias to join him on his world tour as a special guest performer that would sing and dance before sell-out crowds in the Philippines, Japan, Malaysia, Australia, Canada, and even back in her own native United States.

Krista self-produced her debut album entitled Feels So Good'. She represented herself to labels and locked in multiple distribution deals for her project (Universal Records in the Philippines and Warner Music Group in Malaysia, Singapore, Brunei).

== Notes ==
Awards and achievements
Preceded by Melody Gersbach	Binibining Pilipinas International; 2010	Succeeded by Dianne Necio
