= Miss World Philippines 2012 =

2nd Miss World Philippines pageant

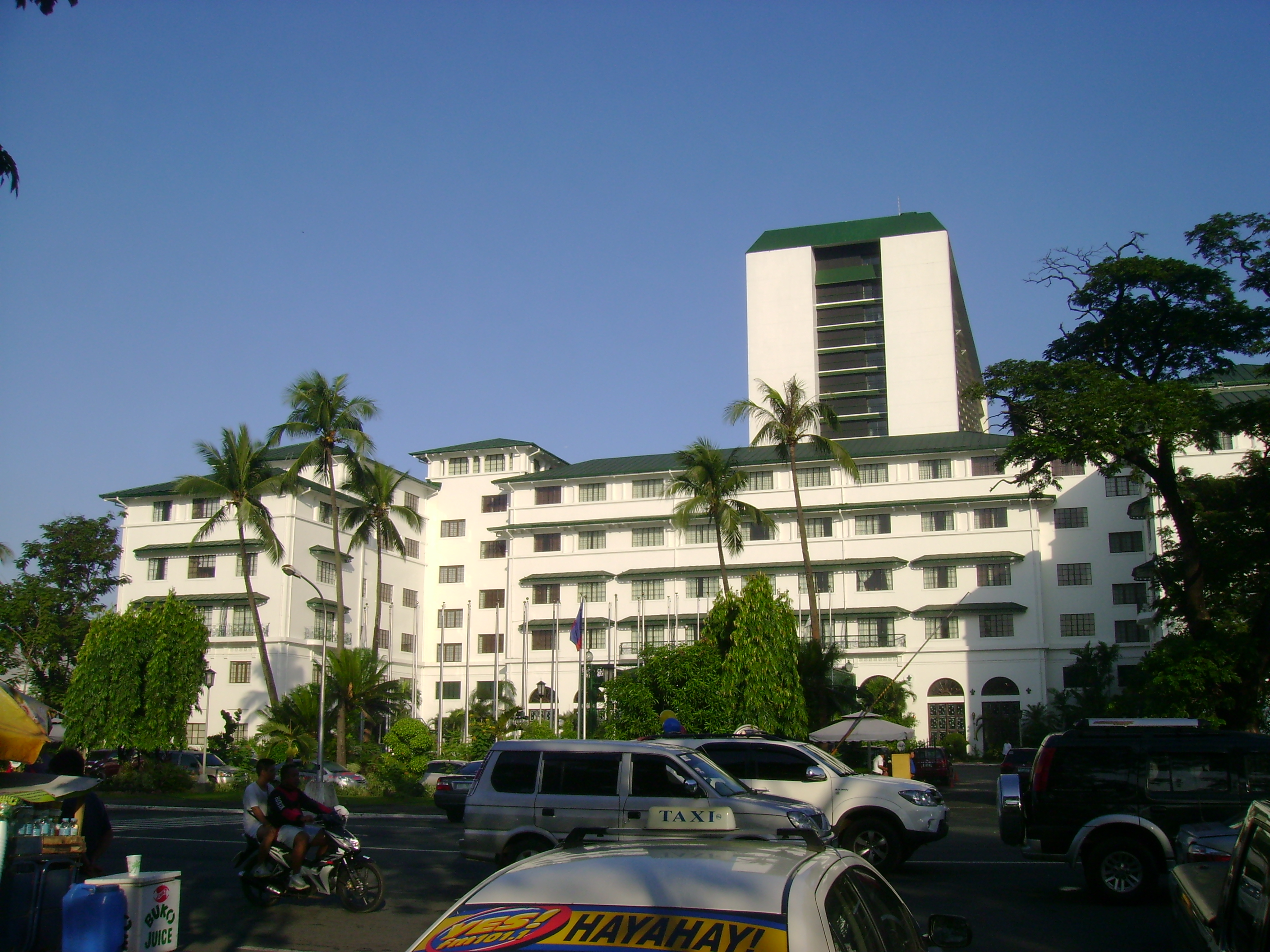
- Manila Hotel, the venue for Miss World Philippines 2012
- Date: June 24, 2012
- Presenters: Edu Manzano; Ruffa Gutierrez; Patricia Fernandez; Mr. Fu; Victor Basa; John James Uy
- Entertainment: Joey Generoso of Side A; Jay Durias
- Venue: Manila Hotel, Manila, Philippines
- Broadcaster: TV5
- Entrants: 25
- Placements: 12
- Winner: Queenierich Rehman; Las Piñas
- Congeniality: Vanessa Claudine Ammann; Lapu-Lapu
- Photogenic: Queenierich Rehman; Las Piñas

Miss World Philippines 2012 was the second Miss World Philippines pageant, held at the Manila Hotel in Manila, Philippines, on June 24, 2012.

At the end of the event, Gwendoline Ruais crowned Queenierich Rehman as Miss World Philippines 2012. Mary Ann Misa was named as First Princess, Vanessa Ammann as Second Princess, April Love Jordan as Third Princess, and Brenna Cassandra Gamboa as Fourth Princess.

== Results ==
Color key

- The contestant was a semi-finalist in an international pageant.

| Placement | Contestant | International Placement |
|---|---|---|
| Miss World Philippines 2012 | #22 – Queenierich Rehman | Top 15 – Miss World 2012 |
| 1st Princess | #13 – Mary Ann Misa | |
| 2nd Princess | #02 – Vanessa Claudine Ammann | |
| 3rd Princess | #17 – April Love Jordan | |
| 4th Princess | #16 – Brenna Cassandra Gamboa | |
| Top 12 | #01 – Kay Wigand; #05 – Carla Jenina Lizardo; #11 – Vania Valiry Vispo; #12 – Paulina Eliseef; #14 – Mariver Ocampo; #18 – Rufaida Babudin; #19 – Loraine de Guzman | |

=== Special awards ===
| Award | Contestant | Ref. |
|---|---|---|
| Best in Long Gown | #17 – April Love Jordan | |
| Best in Swimwear | #22 – Queenierich Rehman | |
| Miss Photogenic | #22 – Queenierich Rehman | |
| Miss Talent | #22 – Queenierich Rehman | |
| Miss Friendship | #2 – Vanessa Claudine Ammann | |
| Best in Fashion Runway | #16 – Brenna Cassandra Gamboa | |
| Miss Manila Hotel | #17 – April Love Jordan | |
| Miss OraCare | #17 – April Love Jordan | |
| Miss Philippine Prudential | #22 – Queenierich Rehman | |
| Miss World Traveler | #22 – Queenierich Rehman | |
| Miss Laguna World | #2 – Vanessa Claudine Ammann | |
| Miss Manny O' Wine | #16 – Brenna Cassandra Gamboa | |
| Smart People's Choice | #11 – Vania Valiry Vispo | |
| Miss Olay | #2 – Vanessa Claudine Ammann | |
| Miss Pantene | #22 – Queenierich Rehman | |
| Miss AMAzing Beauty and Brains | #22 – Queenierich Rehman | |
| Miss Myphone | #2 – Vanessa Claudine Ammann | |

== Judges ==
- Lorna Tolentino – Actress
- James Younghusband – Professional football player
- Ramon “Bong” Revilla Jr. – Incumbent Senator of the Philippines
- Juan Edgardo Angara – Aurora Representative
- Jorge Estregan Ejercito Jr. – Governor of Laguna
- Jose David Lina Jr. – Former Senator of the Philippines and current president of the Manila Hotel

== Contestants ==
25 contestants competed for the title.

| No. | Contestant | Age | Hometown |
|---|---|---|---|
| 1 | Kay Wigand | 19 | Puerto Galera |
| 2 | Vanessa Claudine Ammann | 23 | Lapu-Lapu |
| 3 | Rosheila Tungol | 24 | Angeles |
| 4 | Mariz Ong | 20 | Echague |
| 5 | Carla Jenina Lizardo | 22 | Pasig |
| 6 | Paula Rich Bartolome | 21 | Santa Cruz |
| 7 | Maria Teresita Baccay | 21 | Cabanatuan |
| 8 | Maham Ahmed | 17 | San Carlos |
| 9 | Rizzini Alexis Gomez † | 21 | Cordova |
| 10 | Larah Grace Lacap | 18 | Batasan Hills |
| 11 | Vania Valiry Vispo | 24 | Pasig |
| 12 | Paulina Eliseeff | 20 | Quezon City |
| 13 | Mary Ann Ross Misa | 23 | Parañaque |
| 14 | Mariver Ocampo | 19 | Paombong |
| 15 | Daphne Tanya Molenaar | 17 | Bacolod |
| 16 | Brenna Cassandra Gamboa | 22 | Laurel |
| 17 | April Love Jordan † | 23 | Tondo |
| 18 | Rufaida Babudin | 20 | Palawan |
| 19 | Marie Loraine Diane De Guzman | 24 | Santa Mesa |
| 20 | Kaye Michelle Agnes | 24 | Sorsogon |
| 21 | Fer Mary Baliquig | 20 | Tagbilaran |
| 22 | Queenierich Rehman | 23 | Las Piñas |
| 23 | Lara Lee Sarino | 21 | Negros Occidental |
| 24 | Natacha Kristel Peugniez | 17 | Muntinlupa |
| 25 | Maria Danna Javier | 19 | Malabon |

== Notes ==
=== Post-pageant notes ===
- Queenierich Rehman competed at the Miss World 2012 pageant in Ordos where she finished as a Top 15 semifinalist.
- Rizzini Alexis Gomez competed at Mutya ng Pilipinas 2012 where she won the Mutya ng Pilipinas-Tourism 2012 title. She competed at the Miss Tourism International 2012 pageant in Malaysia and won the international crown. On October 13, 2015, Gomez died due to lung cancer.
