= MassKara Festival =

Annual festival in Bacolod, Philippines

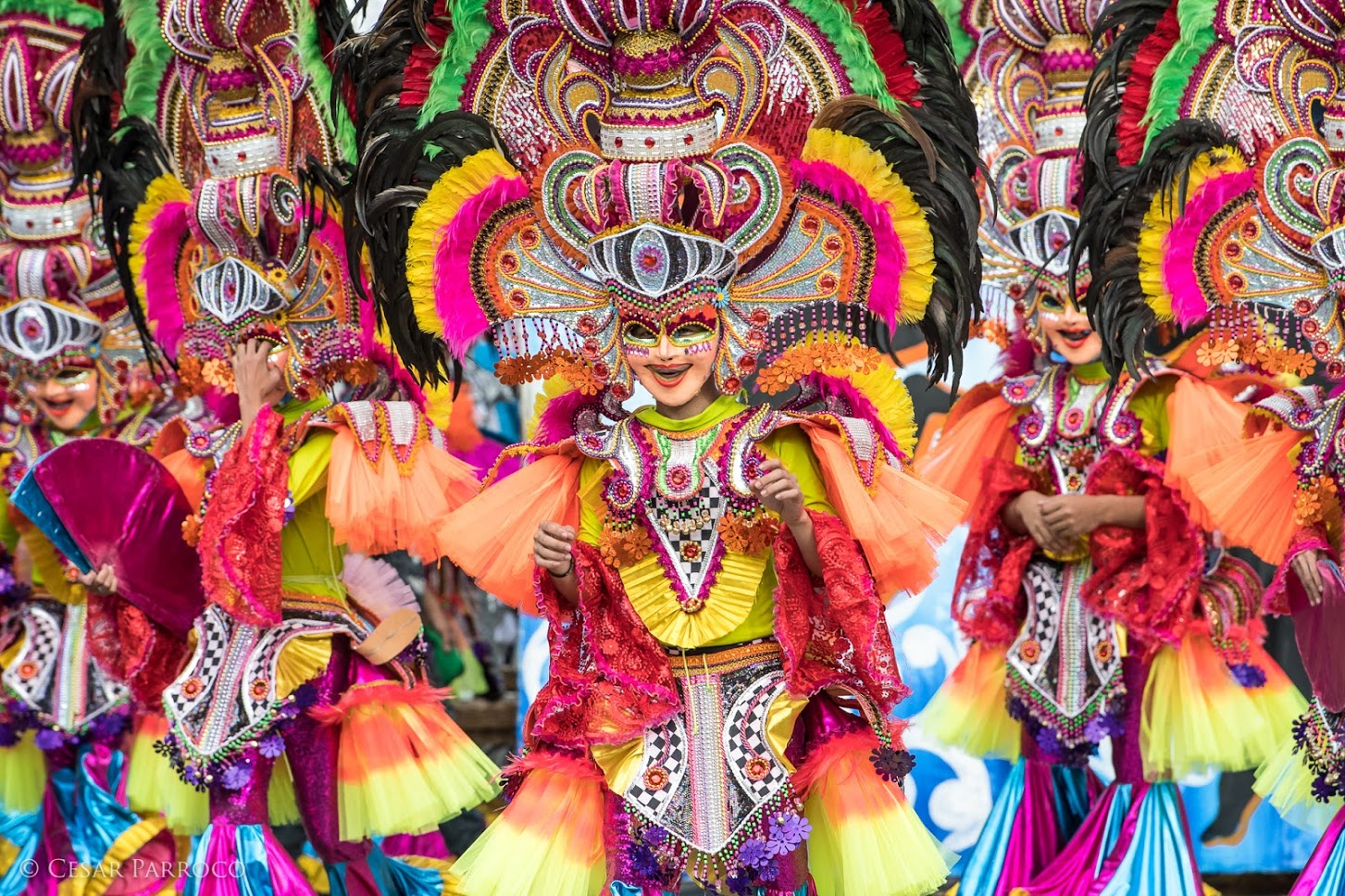
- Masskara Festival Bacolod
- Observed by: Bacolod, Philippines
- Type: Cultural
- Date: Third Sunday in October
- 2025 date: October 19
- 2026 date: October 18
- 2027 date: October 17
- 2028 date: October 15
- First time: October 19, 1980

The MassKara Festival (Hiligaynon: Pista sang MassKara, Filipino: Pista ng MassKara) is an annual festival with highlights held every 3rd Sunday of October in Bacolod, Philippines. The festival sites include the Bacolod Public Plaza, the Lacson Tourism Strip and the Bacolod City Government Center.

== Etymology ==
The word "Masskara" is a portmanteau, coined by the late artist Ely Santiago from mass (a multitude of people), and the Spanish word cara (face), thus forming MassKara (a multitude of faces). The word is also a pun on maskara, Filipino for "mask" (itself from Spanish máscara), since it is a prominent feature of the festival and is always adorned with smiling faces, giving rise to Bacolod being called the "City of Smiles".

== History ==
The Festival first began in 1980. The province relied on sugar cane as its primary agricultural crop and the price of sugar was at an all-time low due to the introduction of sugar substitutes like high fructose corn syrup in the United States. This was the first MassKara Festival and a time of tragedy; on April 22 of that year, the inter-island vessel MV Don Juan carrying many Negrenses, including those belonging to prominent families in Bacolod City, collided with the tanker Tacloban City and sank in Tablas Strait off Mindoro while en route from Manila to Bacolod, which resulted in 18 lives lost, and 115 missing.

In the midst of these events, the local government then headed by the late Mayor Jose "Digoy" Montalvo appropriated a seed fund and enjoined the city's artistic community, civic and business groups to hold a "festival of smiles", to live up to the City's moniker as the "City of Smiles". They reasoned that a festival was also a good opportunity to pull the residents out of the pervasive gloomy atmosphere brought by the Don Juan Tragedy. The initial festival was held during the City's Charter Day celebration on October 19, 1980, and was steered by an organizing committee created by City Hall which was headed by the late councilor Romeo Geocadin and then city tourism officer Evelio Leonardia. It was a declaration by the people of the city that no matter how tough and bad the times were, Bacolod City was going to pull through, survive, and in the end, triumph.

The festival has evolved into one of the major annual tourism attractions of the Philippines over the next four decades. The MassKara Festival served as a catalyst for the far-reaching growth and development of the city's tourism, hospitality, culinary, crafts and souvenirs and services sectors. In later years, the Electric Masskara was added as another attraction of the Festival. For several nights leading to the highlight weekend, tribes of MassKara dancers garbed in colorful neon and LED lights on illuminated floats make their way up and down the Lacson Strip, a one kilometer stretch of merrymaking dotted with band stages, souvenir stands, exotic car displays and roadside bars and food set-ups put out by restaurant and hotels along the strip. It is said that beer consumption during the festival is so high that at one time during the first few stagings of the festival, it bled dry the Mandaue brewery of San Miguel Corporation on nearby Cebu island. The company eventually built its Bacolod brewery to serve the city and Negros Island.

The 2019 marks the 40th celebration of the festival, aptly called Ruby Masskara.

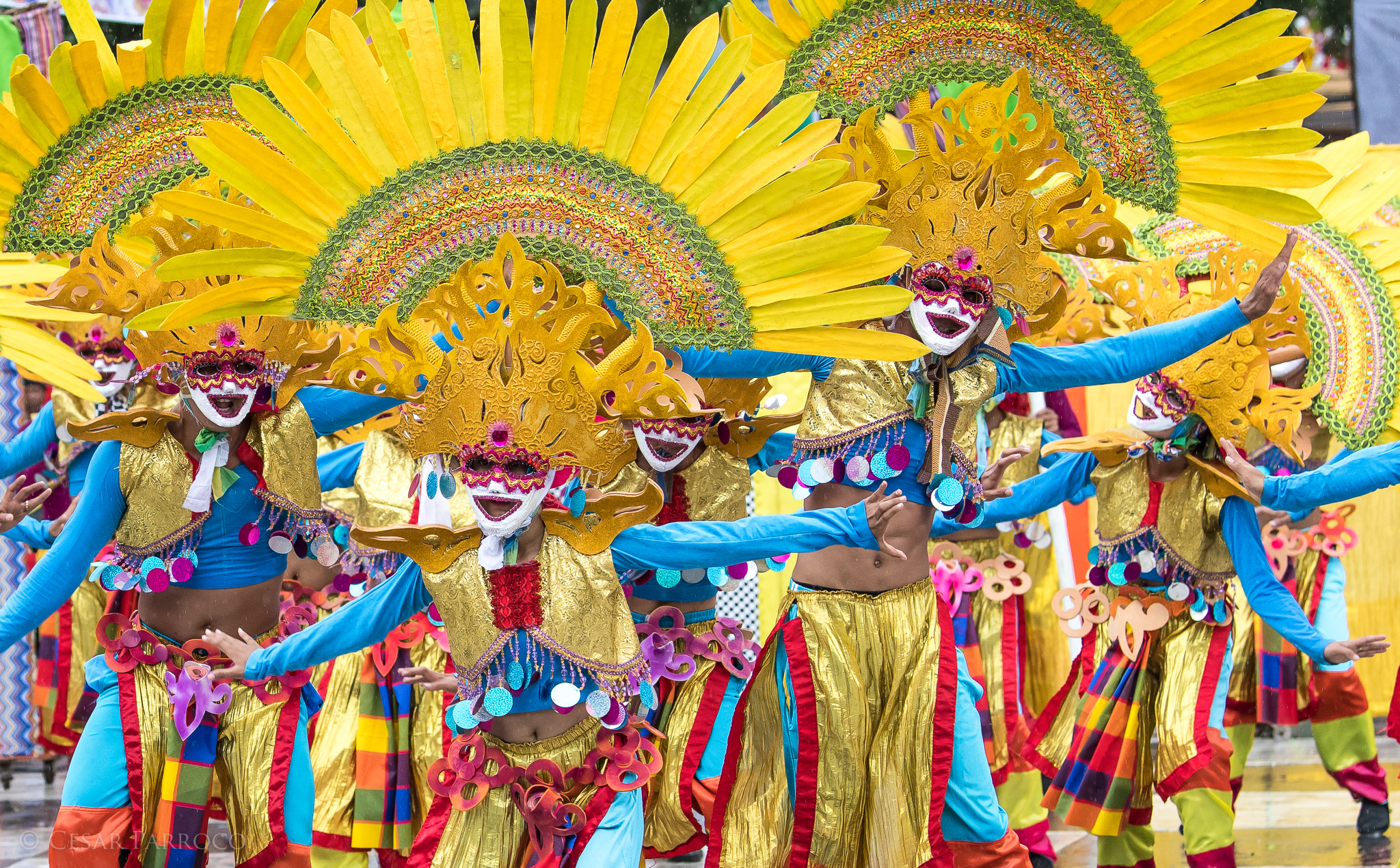
Masskara Festival Dancers in Bacolod City

== Events ==
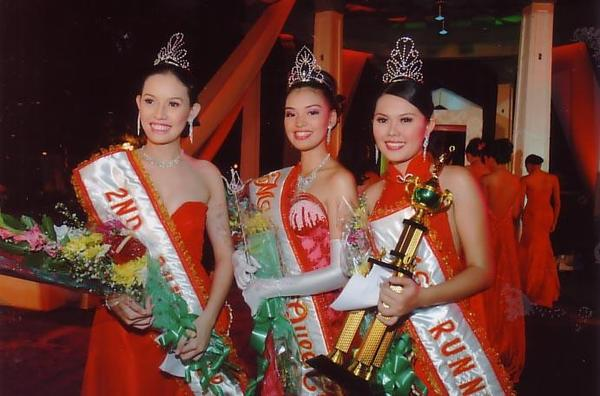
Winners of the MassKara Queen pageant in 2005

The festival features a street dance competition where various groups of street dancers (with contingents representing different schools and barangays) parade through the streets before performing on a stage. Major activities include the MassKara Queen (renamed to Miss Bacolod MassKara since 2022) beauty pageant, carnivals, drum, bugle corps competitions, food festivals, sports events, musical concerts, agriculture-trade fairs, garden shows, and other special events 67 every year.

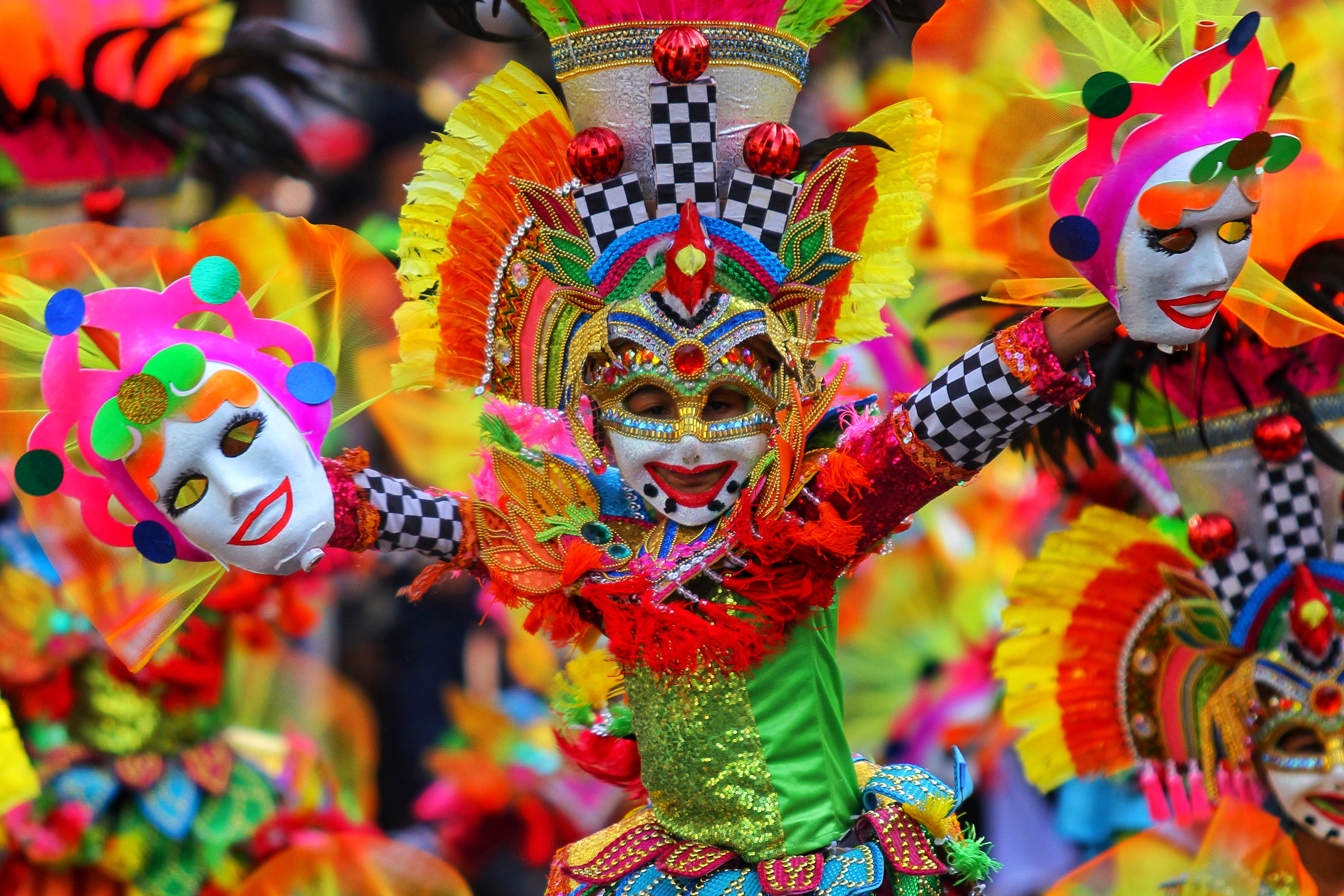
Masskara Festival Bacolod City

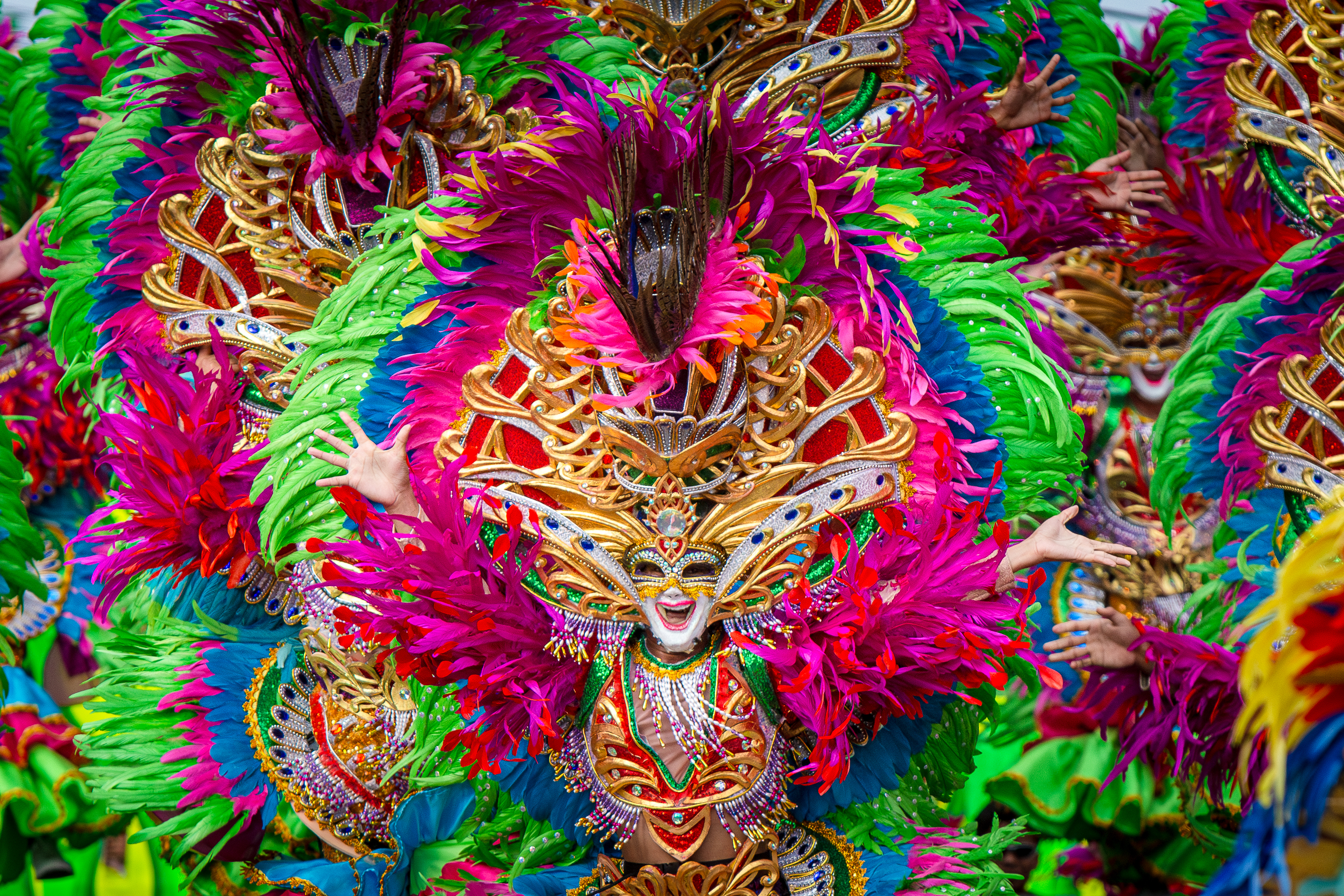
Masskara Festival 2024 Champion - Brgy Granada - Grand Slam

=== Electric MassKara ===
Electric MassKara is a parade with music, lights and floats.

Year	Champion	1st Runner-up	2nd Runner-up
2008	Villamonte	33	Singcang
2009	33	TBA	TBA
2010	Pahanocoy		

=== Street dancing ===
The street dance competition is divided into two categories; the school division and the barangay division. The latter is considered as the highlight of the street dancing competition.

==== Grand champions ====
List of Barangay Category And Electric MassKara Winners:

Year	Champion	1st Runner-up	2nd Runner-up	3rd Runner-up	4th Runner-up	5th Runner-up	6th Runner-up	7th Runner-up
1998	10							
1999	Estefania							
2000	Pahanocoy							
2001	Pahanocoy							
2002	Pahanocoy							
2003	Villamonte							
2004	Villamonte							
2005	Villamonte							
2006	Alijis	32	Singcang Airport					
2007	Alijis	23	28					
2008	Mandalagan	Villamonte	23	N/A	N/A			
2009	Taculing	Mandalagan	23	N/A	N/A			
2010	Mandalagan	17	Alangilan	N/A	N/A			
2011	Banago	17	Tangub	23	Alijis			
2012	17	Cabug	6	32	Alijis			
2013	16	Cabug	Alijis	22	15			
2014	Granada	Villamonte	Alijis	23	Tangub			
2015	Granada	Tangub	Alangilan	N/A	N/A			
2016	Granada	Tangub	Banago	Pahanocoy	Alangilan			
2017	18	Punta Taytay	Mandalagan	Tangub	Alijis			
2018	Tangub	18	Villamonte	Alijis	Mandalagan			
2019	Estefania	Tangub	16	Banago	Bata			
2020	Cancelled due to the COVID-19 pandemic							
2021	Cancelled due to the COVID-19 pandemic							
2022	Granada	Sum-ag	Estefania	35	Singcang	Tangub	31	Alangilan
2023	Granada	Tangub	Sum-ag	Handumanan	Mansilingan			
2024	Granada	Bata	12	35	18	Electric Masskara Float Parade Champion Barangay 29		
2025	Tangub	Bata	29					
2026	Taculing	Mandalagan	Handumanan					

== See also ==
- Bacolod
- Negros Occidental
- List of Philippine-related topics
- MassKara Festival Queen
- Panaad sa Negros Festival
- Mardi Gras
