= Miss World Philippines 2011 =

1st Miss World Philippines pageant

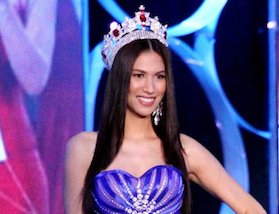
- Gwendoline Ruais
- Date: September 18, 2011
- Presenters: Dingdong Dantes; Isabelle Daza; Carla Abellana
- Entertainment: Mark Bautista; Aljur Abrenica
- Venue: Philippine International Convention Center, Pasay, Metro Manila, Philippines
- Broadcaster: GMA Network
- Entrants: 25
- Placements: 12
- Winner: Gwendoline Ruais; Muntinlupa
- Congeniality: Rogelie Catacutan; Cebu City
- Photogenic: Samantha Neville Purvor; Quezon City

Miss World Philippines 2011 was the first Miss World Philippines pageant, held at the Philippine International Convention Center in Pasay, Metro Manila, Philippines, on September 18, 2011. It was the first edition under the new organization.

At the end of the event, Miss World 2010, Alexandra Mills crowned Gwendoline Gaelle Sandrine Ruais as the first Miss World Philippines. Helen Nicolette Henson was named as First Princess, Martha Chloe McCulley as Second Princess, Maria Paula Bianca Paz as Third Princess, and Jaysel Arrozal as Fourth Princess.

Ruais went on to place as 1st Princess and awarded as Asia and Oceania Continental Queen at the Miss World 2011 pageant held on November 6, 2011 in London, United Kingdom.

== Results ==
Color key

- The contestant was a runner-up in an international pageant.

Placement	Contestant	International Placement
Miss World Philippines 2011	#13 – Gwendoline Gaelle Sandrine Ruais	1st Runner-Up – Miss World 2011
1st Princess	#24 – Helen Nicolette Henson	
2nd Princess	#9 – Martha Chloe McCulley	
3rd Princess	#22 – Maria Paula Bianca Paz	
4th Princess	#15 – Jaysel Arrozal	
Top 12	#1 – Samantha Neville Purvor; #5 – Rogelie Catacutan; #7 – Charlotte Melissa Tyler; #11 – Mercy Malaluan; #12 – Elaine Kay Moll; #16 – Loucelle De Jesus (People's Choice); #25 – Erina Ann Lightholder	

=== Special awards ===
Award	Contestant	Ref.
Best in Fashion Design	#13 – Gwendoline Ruais (Delby Bragais – Designer)	
Best in Evening Gown	#22 – Maria Paula Bianca Paz (Francis Libiran – Designer)	
Best in Swimsuit	#13 – Gwendoline Ruais	
Miss Talent	#5 – Rogelie Catacutan	
Miss Photogenic	#1 – Samantha Purvor	
Miss Friendship	#5 – Rogelie Catacutan	
Miss SMDC	#9 – Martha Chloe McCulley	
Miss Kapuso World	#9 – Martha Chloe McCulley	
Miss Healthy Body	#13 – Gwendoline Ruais	
Miss Philippine Prudential Life Insurance	#20 – Jayanne Marie Aldanese	
Miss Metro Dental Smile	#24 – Helen Nicolette Henson	
Miss Manny O	#1 – Samantha Purvor	
Miss Sheridan	#6 – Richelle Therese Borja	
Miss Shimmian	#25 – Erina Ann Lightholder	

== Judges ==
- Wilma Galvante - GMA Network Senior Vice President for Entertainment
- Victoria G. Belo, M.D. - Medical Director of the Belo Medical Group
- Maria Cristina Roco Corona - Spouse of Renato C. Corona, 23rd Chief Justice, Supreme Court of the Philippines
- Iza Calzado - International actress, TV host, model and GMA Network contract artist
- Fanny Serrano - Fashion and beauty industry expert and President of the Philippine International Cosmetologists Association (PICA)
- Manny Pacquiao, PLH - Congressman of the lone district of Sarangani and WBO Welterweight World Champion (Super Champion)
- Carl McClean - Chairman, Superbrand Marketing International Inc.
- Cramer Ball - Regional General Manager (Asia Pacific South & Australasia), Etihad Airways
- Joseph Calata - Chairman and CEO, Calata Corporation

== Contestants ==
25 contestants competed for the title.

No.	Contestant	Age	Hometown
1	Samantha Neville Purvor	24	Quezon
2	Julian Savard	19	Mabalacat
3	Karen Joyce Peñanueva	23	Davao City
4	Irene Gabriel	19	Puerto Princesa
5	Rogelie Catacutan	20	Cebu City
6	Richelle Therese Borja	22	Toledo
7	Charlotte Melissa Tyler	23	Quezon City
8	Gaydra Rama	23	General Santos
9	Martha Chloe McCulley	24	Parañaque
10	Princess Tiffany Carbungco	21	Floridablanca
11	Mercy Malaluan	21	Camarines Norte
12	Elaine Kay Moll	19	Naga
13	Gwendoline Gaelle Sandrine Ruais	21	Muntinlupa
14	Joey Albert Short	23	Zamboanga City
15	Jaysel Arrozal	21	Valenzuela
16	Loucelle De Jesus	22	Angeles
17	Erin Dolores Lane	18	Taguig
18	Donna Maricel Cardino	22	Mandaue
19	Mica Angela Angeles	17	Santa Rosa
20	Jayanne Marie Aldanese	19	Pasay
21	Mae Liezel Ramos	20	Camarines Sur
22	Maria Paula Bianca Paz	22	Nueva Ecija
23	Christine Kate Adi	23	Baguio
24	Helen Nicolette Henson	22	Pampanga
25	Erina Ann Lightholder	22	California

== Notes ==
=== Prizes ===
- Miss World Philippines 2011 wins ₱1,000,000 cash tax-free, a brand new SMDC condominium unit, GMA management contract, and the right to represent the country in the Miss World 2011.

=== Post-pageant notes ===
- Gwendoline Ruais competed at Miss World 2011 in London and was named 1st Runner-Up. Ruais also won the Continental Queen of Asia title. After her stint in Miss World, Ruais joined the fourth season of Asia's Next Top Model where she placed eleventh.
- Elaine Kay Moll and Rogelie Catacutan competed at Binibining Pilipinas 2012 and Binibining Pilipinas 2015, respectively. Moll was named 1st Runner-Up and was appointed as Binibining Pilipinas Supranational 2012, while Catacutan was crowned Binibining Pilipinas Supranational 2015. Moll was named 3rd Runner-Up when she competed in Miss Supranational 2012, while Catacutan was one of the twenty semifinalists when she competed in 2015.
