= Shamcey Supsup-Lee =

Filipino model (born 1986)

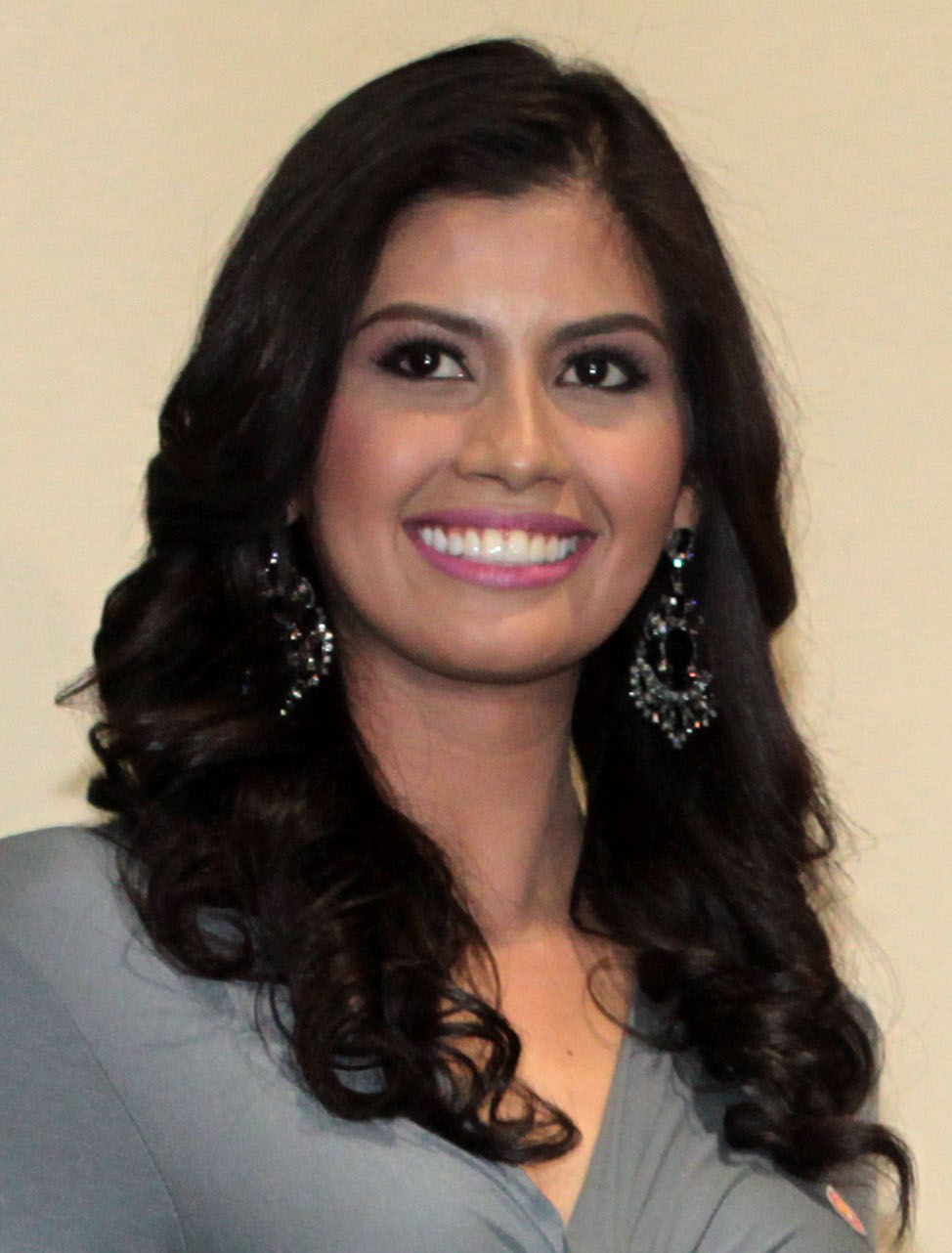
- Born: Shamcey Gurrea Supsup; May 16, 1986 (age 40); Iligan, Philippines
- Education: University of the Philippines Diliman (BS)
- Political party: Independent
- Spouse: Lloyd Lee (m. 2013)
- Children: 2
- Height: 1.70 m (5 ft 7 in)
- Beauty pageant titleholder
- Title: Binibining Pilipinas Universe 2011
- Hair color: Black
- Eye color: Brown
- Major competitions: Binibining Pilipinas 2011; (Winner – Binibining Pilipinas Universe 2011); (Miss Talent); (Miss Philippine Airlines); (Miss Creamsilk); Miss Universe 2011; (3rd Runner-Up)

Shamcey Gurrea Supsup-Lee (Tagalog: [ˈʃamsi ˈsupsʊp li]; born May 16, 1986) is a Filipino architect and a beauty pageant titleholder. She was crowned as Binibining Pilipinas Universe 2011. She represented the Philippines at the Miss Universe 2011 pageant in São Paulo, Brazil where she finished as 3rd Runner-Up. From 2020 to 2023, Supsup was the national director for the Miss Universe Philippines Organization.

== Early life and education ==
Shamcey Gurrea Supsup was born on 16 May 1986 at Mercy Community Clinic in Iligan, Lanao del Norte, to Timoteo Ferolino Supsup and Marcelina Luega Gurrea. Supsup moved with her family to General Santos when she was three years old, where she was raised primarily by her father while her mother worked overseas. Before studying in Manila, she helped her father on a farm.

Supsup graduated salutatorian in grade school and salutatorian in high school. She graduated magna cum laude from the University of the Philippines Diliman with architecture as her field of discipline.

She topped the Philippines' licensure examination for architects in June 2010 with a board rating of 86.60%.

== Pageantry ==
=== Binibining Pilipinas 2011 ===
In 2011, Supsup joined the 48th edition of the Binibining Pilipinas pageant. During the question and answer portion, she was asked: "With what worthy cause do you identify yourself and why?" She responded:

"I think one worthy cause I can identify myself is valuing education because I believe that education is something that cannot be taken away from you. You can have money, you can have fame. But in the end, it can be taken from you. But education will always be there to help you in your life."

At the end of the event, Supsup won the title of Binibining Pilipinas Universe 2011 during the coronation night held at the Araneta Coliseum on April 10, 2011 alongside the Miss Philippine Airlines, Miss Talent and Miss Creamsilk awards.

On April 15, 2012, Supsup crowned Janine Tugonon as her successor at the Binibining Pilipinas 2012 pageant held at the Smart Araneta Coliseum in Quezon City, Philippines.

=== Miss Universe 2011 ===
Supsup represented the Philippines at the Miss Universe 2011 pageant held in São Paulo, Brazil, on 12 September 2011. She became popular on the said competition because of her "Tsunami Walk". During the question and answer portion, she was asked: "Would you change your religious beliefs to marry the person you love? Why and why not?" She responded:

"If I had to change my religious beliefs, I will not marry the person that I love because the first person that I love is God, who created me. And I have my faith, my principles, and this is what makes me who I am. And if that person loves me, he should love my God too."

At the end of the event, she finished as 3rd Runner-Up to Leila Lopes of Angola. In 2019, she became the national director of the Miss Universe franchise in the Philippines, succeeding her former mentor and pageant director, Stella Araneta.

=== Pageant management ===
In 2019, Supsup was appointed by Miss Universe Organization as national director for the Miss Universe Philippines Organization, succeeding former national director Stella Araneta of Binibining Pilipinas.

Following this in 2021, Miss Universe Philippines faced controversy, when unexpectedly, one of their applicants, Mara La Torre came into the pageant scene following Supsup's announcement of accepting transgender women into the national pageant. Mara La Torre was able to undergo the screening of the pageant after being able to provide needed documents including her medical records of undergoing sex reassignment surgery and other legal documents reflecting her female identity despite the challenges transgender women face in the Philippines to produce those documents to reflect their identity. Despite this, La Torre was still disqualified and endured sexual abuse in her entry into the pageant. This gained international attention that prompted enquiry into real inclusivity of the pageant.

== Television ==
After participating in national pageants, Supsup became a judge in the talent show It's Showtime in 2011. After appearing on 18 episodes, Supsup left her seat to pursue preparations for her then-upcoming participation in Miss Universe 2011. She returned on TV It's Showtime as an occasional guest co-host, often filling in for Anne Curtis. She also returned to Binibining Pilipinas as a co-host and made appearance in the pre-pageant shows and finals events from 2012 to 2015. In November 2012, Supsup hosted the Miss Universe 2012 team as the host of the web coverage.

Supsup has also served as a host for the ANC lifestyle program CityScape. Supsup hosted the design digest program Interior Motives on the cable channel Lifestyle Network (now Metro Channel). She replaced model and actress Angel Aquino. Since 2015, Supsup co-hosts the talk show Real Talk on CNN Philippines (now RPTV).

== Politics ==
On October 7, 2024, Supsup filed her certificate of candidacy to run for 1st district councilor of Pasig in 2025. Though running as an independent, she was named part of the Team Kaya This, the local opposition slate led by mayoral candidate Sarah Discaya of the Unyon ng mga Gabay ng Bayan (UGB) party.

However, Supsup withdrew from the slate on April 7, 2025, citing differences in her values, following the misogynistic remarks by the slate's congressional candidate Christian Sia. She subsequently lost the election, placing seventh.

== Personal life ==
Supsup married Lloyd Lee, an American businessman, on December 29, 2013. Former Binibining Pilipinas national director Stella Araneta was designated as one of the principal sponsors to their Christian wedding.

On January 24, 2016, Supsup gave birth to her first child. On September 30, 2018, Supsup gave birth to her second child.

Awards and achievements
Preceded by (Ukraine) Anna Poslavska	Miss Universe (3rd Runner-Up); 2011	Succeeded by (Australia) Renae Ayris
Preceded by Venus Raj (Bato, Camarines Sur)	Binibining Pilipinas Universe; 2011	Succeeded by Janine Tugonon (Bataan)
