= Venus Raj =

Filipino model, actress, TV host, and beauty queen (born 1988)

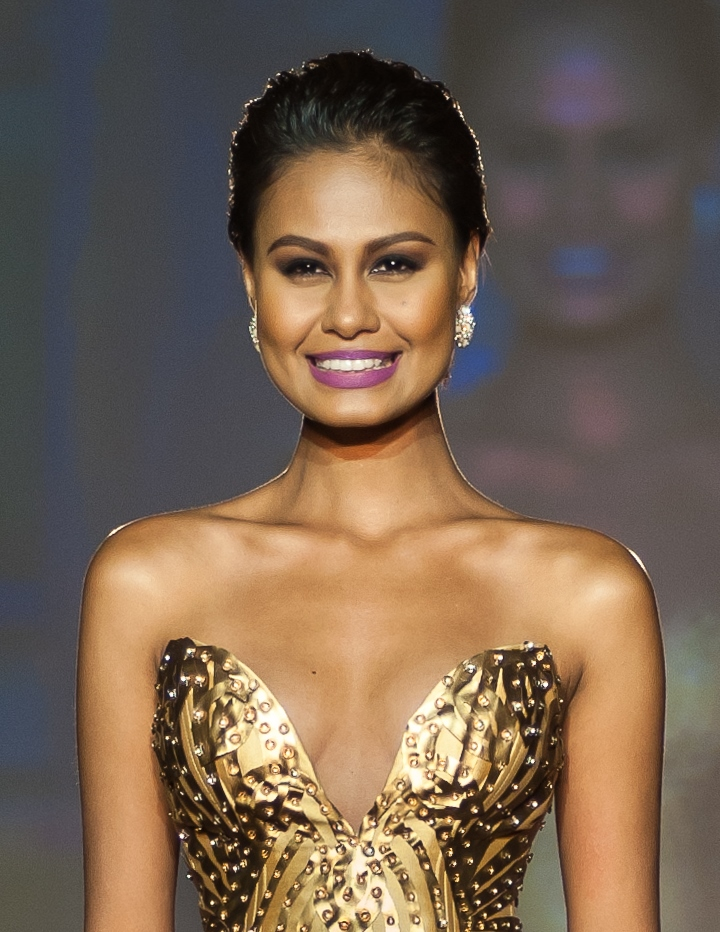
- Raj at a fashion show in Toronto, 2014
- Born: Maria Venus Bayonito Raj; July 7, 1988 (age 38); Doha, Qatar
- Education: Bicol University (BA); University of the Philippines Diliman (MS)
- Height: 1.75 m (5 ft 9 in)
- Spouse: North Orillan (m. 2023)
- Beauty pageant titleholder
- Title: Miss Philippines Eco Tourism 2008; Binibining Pilipinas Universe 2010
- Agency: Binibining Pilipinas Charities, Inc.; Star Magic (2010-2011)
- Hair color: Black
- Eye color: Brown
- Major competitions: Miss Philippines Earth 2008; (Miss Philippines Eco Tourism 2008); Binibining Pilipinas 2010; (Winner – Binibining Pilipinas Universe 2010); (Best in Long Gown); (Best in Philippine Terno); (Miss Friendship); Miss Universe 2010; (4th Runner-Up)

Maria Venus Bayonito Raj-Orillan (/rɑːdʒ/; Tagalog pronunciation: [ɾah, ɾadʒ]; born July 7, 1988) is a Filipino actress, model, and beauty pageant titleholder who was crowned Binibining Pilipinas Universe 2010. She represented the Philippines at the Miss Universe 2010 pageant and placed 4th Runner-up.

Raj placed as fourth runner-up in 59th Miss Universe pageant, where she is known for her answer "Major Major". Amongst the Filipino pageantry world, she is regarded as the “drought-breaker,” after breaking the Philippines’ 10 year unplacement streak in Miss Universe since 2000.

== Early life and education ==
Maria Venus Bayonito Raj was born in Doha, Qatar, to an Indian-American father and a Filipino mother, the youngest of five children. She came to the Philippines while still an infant and was raised in Bato, Camarines Sur.

For the first two decades of her life, Raj lived in a nipa hut made of wood, bamboo and anahaw leaves, with no electricity, in the middle of a sprawling rice field. She allegedly used rice paddy dikes for her early training, where she eventually developed her distinctive walk.

Raj started out by joining local beauty pageants, as well as oratorical contests at San Vicente High School, where her English teacher served as her coach. Using the prize money won in major contests, she then bought land on an installment basis for her mother to help improve their livelihood.

Raj obtained her bachelor's degree in communication arts, major in journalism, at Bicol University in Legazpi, Albay, with Latin honors (cum laude). She graduated through the scholarship that she received from the Francis Papica Foundation. She initially worked as an Information Assistant for the Department of Environment and Natural Resources for Bicol Region. It was at this time that she also worked as a part-time fashion model in both her native Bicol and Manila.

In 2017, Raj completed her master's degree in community development from the University of the Philippines Diliman.

In June 2021, Raj graduated from Oxford Centre for Christian Apologetics (OCCA), Oxford, England.

On December 12, 2023, Raj married her boyfriend named North Orillan. Raj had a one-year relationship with Andrei Felix.

== Pageantry ==
=== Miss Philippines Earth 2008 ===
Raj first competed in Miss Philippines Earth 2008 where she was crowned as Miss Philippines Eco Tourism 2008.

=== Binibining Pilipinas 2010 ===
After joining Miss Philippines Earth 2008, Raj took a break from beauty contests and worked as an Information Assistant at the regional office of the Department of Environment and Natural Resources. On March 6, 2010, she was crowned Binibining Pilipinas Universe 2010 during the pageant's Grand Coronation Night at the Araneta Coliseum. She also won the special awards for Best in Long Gown, Best in Philippine Terno, and Miss Friendship. She gained the right to represent the Philippines at the 2010 Miss Universe pageant in Las Vegas, Nevada.

=== Miss Universe 2010 ===
The Philippines' pending participation at Miss Universe 2010 attracted international attention due to Binibining Pilipinas' controversial initial dethronement of Raj for citizenship reasons. However, due to increasing public pressure and the ensuing intervention of the Miss Universe Organization under Donald Trump, national director Stella Araneta and the country's Department of Foreign Affairs made an agreement with Raj to reinstate her to the national title upon making an exception to grant her a Philippine passport. Raj eventually travelled in August 2010 to Las Vegas, United States and became the official Philippine delegate to the competition.

During the Miss Universe competition, Raj was emotionally distressed to hear about the death of Filipino-German beauty queen Melody Gersbach and make-up artist Alden Orense in a car accident. Gersbach, a fellow Bicolana who previously competed and placed in the Top 15 at Miss International 2009 in China, was one of Raj's coaches in her preparation for the Miss Universe pageant. Raj was one of six delegates who were handpicked for a media tour, Raj, along with Jesinta Campbell of Australia, Natalia Navarro of Colombia, Sarodj Bertin of Haiti, Ximena Navarrete of Mexico, Mariana Vicente of Puerto Rico and Miss Universe 2009 Stefania Fernandez were scheduled for several television appearances prior to the actual pageant in Las Vegas. Raj received the highest rating in the Miss Universe website, with 3.54 points, the highest-ever for a Philippine delegate.

Raj was the last delegate to be announced to the Top 15, signalling both an end to a 10-year semifinal drought for the Philippines and the beginning of its streak of appearances at Miss Universe during the live finale up to 2021 - the country's longest in its history on the pageant. During the Miss Universe question and answer portion, Raj was asked by American actor William Baldwin about the biggest mistake that she made in her life and what she did to make it right, to which she simply replied that she had never made any big mistakes in her life, citing the famed answer "Major Major" in her response. Raj eventually finished in the Top 5 as 4th runner-up to winner Navarrete from Mexico, marking the Philippines' highest placement at Miss Universe since Miriam Quiambao placed second in the competition in 1999.

== Television career ==
Prior and after Miss Universe, Raj guested on multiple networks as guests. Eventually she was offered hosting stints including a spot in the morning show Umagang Kay Ganda. In 2011, Raj signed up an exclusive contract with ABS-CBN, coinciding with the network gaining the airing rights of the Binibining Pilipinas pageant for at least five years. In 2013, she left Umagang Kay Ganda due to the reformat of the show. Less busy with entertainment commitments, Raj pursued her master's degree in Community Development at the University of the Philippines Diliman and lent a hand to the group called “Care For Children.”

== Filmography ==
=== Television ===
Year	Title	Role
2011	Mutya	Mikki
2011–2013	ASAP 2012	Host/Performer
2011–2016	Umagang Kay Ganda	Host
2012	Wansapanataym: Bye, Bye Bangungot	Diwata
2012	Maalaala Mo Kaya: Korona	Herself
2014	Wagas	January Isaac
2015	Maalaala Mo Kaya	Christine Balaguer
2015	Tunay Na Buhay	Host
2016	Celebrity Playtime	Herself/Player
2016	A1 Ko Sa 'Yo	Herself
2017	Umagang Kay Ganda	Herself
2017	Family Feud	Herself/Player

=== Film ===
Year	Title	Role	Ref.
2012	Pridyider	Celine	
2013	Slumber Party	Herself	

== Awards and nominations ==
Awards and Nomination
Year	Award giving body	Category	Nominated work	Results
2011	25th PMPC Star Awards for TV	Best Morning Show Host (shared with Umagang Kay Ganda hosts)	Umagang Kay Ganda	Won
2011	5th UPLB Gandingan Awards	Best Morning Show Host (shared with Umagang Kay Ganda hosts)	Umagang Kay Ganda	Won
2012	26th PMPC Star Awards for TV	Best Morning Show Host (shared with Umagang Kay Ganda hosts)	Umagang Kay Ganda	Won
2012	6th UPLB Gandingan Awards	Best Morning Show Host (shared with Umagang Kay Ganda hosts)	Umagang Kay Ganda	Won
2013	27th PMPC Star Awards for TV	Best Morning Show Host (shared with Umagang Kay Ganda hosts)	Umagang Kay Ganda	Nominated
2013	7th UPLB Gandingan Awards	Best Morning Show Host (shared with Umagang Kay Ganda hosts)	Umagang Kay Ganda	Won
2014	28th PMPC Star Awards for TV	Best Travel Show Host (shared with Christina Decena)	Business Flight	Nominated

== See also ==
- Addy Raj

== Notes ==
Awards and achievements
Preceded by (Puerto Rico) Mayra Matos	Miss Universe (4th Runner-Up); 2010	Succeeded by (China) Luo Zilin
Preceded by Bianca Manalo (Parañaque)	Binibining Pilipinas Universe; 2010	Succeeded by Shamcey Supsup (General Santos)
Preceded by Anna Katrina Bautista (Ilocos Region)	Miss Philippines Eco-Tourism; 2008	Succeeded by Grezilda Adelantar (Victorias)
