= Binibining Pilipinas 2009 =

46th Binibining Pilipinas pageant

- Date: March 7, 2009
- Presenters: Paolo Bediones; Iza Calzado
- Entertainment: JC Tiuseco; Chris Cayzer; Aljur Abrenica
- Venue: Araneta Coliseum, Quezon City, Philippines
- Broadcaster: GMA Network (local); GMA Pinoy TV (international)
- Entrants: 24
- Placements: 10
- Winner: Bianca Manalo; Parañaque
- Congeniality: Gizelle Rivamonte; Quezon City
- Photogenic: Marie-Ann Umali; Batangas City

Binibining Pilipinas 2009 was the 46th edition of Binibining Pilipinas. It took place at the Smart Araneta Coliseum in Quezon City, Metro Manila, Philippines on March 7, 2009.

At the end of the event, Jennifer Barrientos crowned Bianca Manalo as Binibining Pilipinas Universe 2009, Danielle Castaño crowned Marie-Ann Umali as Binibining Pilipinas World 2009, and Patricia Fernandez crowned Melody Gersbach as Binibining Pilipinas International 2009. Richell Angalot was named 1st Runner-Up and Regina Hahn was named 2nd Runner-Up.

== Results ==
=== Placements ===
Color keys

- The contestant was a Semi-Finalist in an International pageant.
- The contestant did not place.

Placement	Contestant	International Placement
Binibining Pilipinas Universe 2009	Bb. #15 – Pamela Bianca Manalo	Unplaced – Miss Universe 2009
Binibining Pilipinas World 2009	Bb. #17 – Marie-Ann Umali	Unplaced – Miss World 2009
Binibining Pilipinas International 2009	Bb. #20 – Melody Adelheid Gersbach	Top 15 – Miss International 2009
1st runner-up	Bb. #3 – Richell Angalot	
2nd runner-up	Bb. #11 – Regina Hahn	
Top 10	Bb. #1 – Vanessa Johnson; Bb. #5 – Diana Arevalo; Bb. #9 – April Love Jordan; Bb. #22 – Priscilla Mae Honorio; Bb. #23 – Barbara Salvador	

=== Special awards ===
Award	Contestant	Ref.
Miss Photogenic	Bb. #17 – Marie-Ann Umali	
Miss Talent	Bb. #3 – Richell Angalot	
Miss Friendship	Bb. #4 – Gizelle Rivamonte	
Best In Swimsuit	Bb. #15 – Bianca Manalo	
Best In Long Gown	Bb. #17 – Marie Ann Umali	
Miss Natasha	Bb. #15 – Bianca Manalo	
Miss Natasha Beauty	Bb. #3 – Richell Angalot	
Miss Philippine Airlines	Bb. #15 – Bianca Manalo	
Miss Salsa Jeans	Bb. #22 – Priscilla Mae Honorio	
Shopper's Choice Award	Bb. #3 – Richell Angalot	
Manila Bulletin Reader's Choice Award	Bb. #15 – Bianca Manalo	

== Contestants ==
24 contestants competed for the three titles.

No.	Contestant	Age	Hometown
1	Vanessa Johnson	21	Apalit, Pampanga
2	Carisheila May Kuijpers	21	Olongapo City
3	Richell Angalot	20	Tagbilaran, Bohol
4	Gizelle Jasmin Rivamonte	23	Quezon City
5	Diana Arevalo	20	Calapan, Oriental Mindoro
6	Maria Paula Bianca Paz	20	Quezon City/Baguio
7	Mary Jane dela Cruz	22	Bulacan
8	Cheryl Oliveros	24	Manila
9	April Love Jordan	20	Ilocos Sur
10	Priscilla Michelle Buendia	18	Quezon City/Makati
11	Regina Hahn	26	Pasig
12	Jaysel Arrozal	18	Valenzuela
13	Sandra Inez Seifert	24	Bacolod
14	Keann Alonzo Mallari	22	Angeles
15	Pamela Bianca Manalo	22	Parañaque
16	Mary Tiffany Jones	17	Quezon City
17	Marie-Ann Umali	22	Batangas City
18	Marie Loraine de Guzman	21	Makati
19	Stephanie Rose Señires	23	Cebu City
20	Melody Adelheid Gersbach	23	Daraga
21	Hazel Sutch	19	Mandaluyong
22	Priscilla Mae Honorio	21	Maasi, Southern Leyte
23	Barbara Salvador	22	Marikina
24	Abigail Lesley Cruz	24	Tarlac City

== Notes ==
=== Post-pageant notes ===
- Bianca Manalo competed at Miss Universe 2009 in Nassau, Bahamas but was unplaced. Marie-Ann Umali was also unplaced when she competed at Miss World 2009 in Johannesburg.
- Melody Gersbach competed at Miss International 2009 and was one of the fifteen semifinalists. On August 21, 2010, Gersbach died due to a car-bus collision.
- Both Sandra Seifert and Vanessa Johnson competed at Miss Philippines Earth 2009. Johnson was part of the ten semifinalists, while Seifert won the Miss Philippines Earth 2009 title. Seifert then competed at Miss Earth 2009 in Boracay and was crowned Miss Air 2009. She was also awarded the Best in Swimsuit and Best in Long Gown Award.
