= Misua (drag queen) =

Filipino drag performer (1998–2026)

- Born: Jayson Elvie Go Ty; July 5, 1998
- Died: April 2, 2026 (aged 27); Philippines
- Occupations: Drag performer; graphic designer

Jayson Elvie Go Ty (July 5, 1998 – April 2, 2026), known by the stage name Misua, was a Filipino drag performer most known for his involvement in the fourth season of Drag Race Philippines. Ty died during filming on April 2, 2026.

== Early life ==
Jayson Elvie Go Ty was born on July 5, 1998.

== Career ==
Ty's drag persona was Misua, named after the Asian noodle dish of the same name. Misua was a member of the Haus of LaFeya and performed at the Rampa Drag Club. Misua was a drag performer for approximately eight years.

Outside of drag, Ty worked as a graphic designer.

== Personal life ==
Ty was based in Cagayan de Oro. He died in his sleep on the morning of April 2, 2026, at the age of 27. The cause of death is unconfirmed. Before his death, he was competing on the fourth season of Drag Race Philippines.

Ty's family and World of Wonder, the show's production company, both released statements confirming his death. Blu Hydrangea and Hannah Conda were among Drag Race contestants who offered condolences on social media.

== See also ==
- List of graphic designers
- List of one-word stage names
