= Miss Bhutan =

National beauty pageant competition in Bhutan

- Formation: 2008; 18 years ago
- Type: Beauty pageant
- Headquarters: Thimphu
- Location: Bhutan
- Members: Miss World (2027-Present); Miss Universe (2022); Miss Earth (2008)
- Official language: Dzongkha, English
- Chairman: Sangay Tsheltrim
- Parent organization: MPC Entertainment (2008-2022) Samuh+Shangreela (2025-present)
- Website: www.missbhutan.bt

Miss Bhutan is a national beauty pageant based in Bhutan. The current title holder is Tashi Choden, who represented Bhutan at Miss Universe 2022.

== History ==
On October 10, 2008, MPC Bhutan Entertainment, a Thimphu based film production company, organized Miss Bhutan pageant and launched it first Miss Bhutan beauty pageant. The Founding President of Miss Bhutan Pageant is Karma Tshering.

The selection of the Miss Bhutan finalists and eventually the winner of the pageant is based on the decision of a panel of judges on the performance and physical attributes of the candidates and not by public voting system. The winner of Miss Bhutan receives a cash prize of Nu 100,000. The Miss Bhutan crown, designed in Bhutan, is worth another Nu 100,000.

In 2008, the winner represented the country at Miss Earth beauty pageant. Although there was no swimsuit round in the actual Miss Bhutan contest, the winner is trained in an enclosed area for the swimsuit competition in preparation for the international Miss Earth competition. 77 contestants from all across Bhutan registered for the Miss Bhutan 2008, but only 20 contestants were short listed in the main event after the preliminary round.

On November 9, 2008, Miss Bhutan 2008 Tsoki Tsomo Karchung participated in the 8th edition of Miss Earth beauty pageant, which was held at the Clark Expo Amphitheater in Angeles, Pampanga, Philippines. Eighty-five women arrived from October 19, 2008 in the Philippines. She also took part in Miss Young International in Taiwan, and Miss Safari 2008 in Kenya.

The second Miss Bhutan was held in 2010 where Sonam Choden Retty was the winner and held the title for the longest period (2010-2021). The third edition of Miss Bhutan was held only after a decade, Tashi Choden took the title and is now the reigning queen. She is the first one in the country to represent in the Miss Universe.

Miss Bhutan was restructured in 2026, with Sangay Tsheltrim as the chairman and 'Samuh+Shangreela' as the official organizer. He announced the debut of Bhutan at Miss World 2026.

== Titleholders ==
Year	Miss Bhutan	1st Runner-Up	2nd Runner-Up	3rd Runner Up	4th Runner Up	References
2008	Tsokye Tsomo Karchung; Thimphu, Bhutan	Shelkar Choden; Trongsa, Bhutan	Tshering Pem; Trashigang, Bhutan	Tashi Pelden; Wangdue, Bhutan	Kinga Wangmo; Paro, Bhutan	
2010	Sonam Choden Retty; Punakha, Bhutan	Kinley Yangden Dorji; Thimphu, Bhutan	Tenzin Norden; Haa, Bhutan	Dechen Tshomo; Wangdue, Bhutan	Sangay Dema; Samtse, Bhutan	
2022	Tashi Choden; Wangdue, Bhutan	Sonam Pelden; Wangdue, Bhutan	Eden Zangmo; Trashigang, Bhutan	Not awarded		

== Miss Bhutan 2022 ==
After a hiatus of 12 years, the Miss Bhutan pageant made a triumphant return, generating widespread excitement and attention. The event witnessed a notable surge in participation by exceptionally talented women, surpassing previous editions. Tashi Choden emerged as the victor, attaining the coveted title of Miss Bhutan 2022 and subsequently securing the historic distinction of becoming the first Bhutanese representative at the esteemed Miss Universe pageant. Additionally, Sonam Pelden and Eden Zangmo earned the distinctions of 1st and 2nd runners-up, respectively, in the pageant.

=== Miss Bhutan 2022 Title and Placement ===
Title	Contestant
Miss Bhutan 2022	Tashi Choden
1st Runner Up	Sonam Peldon
2nd Runner Up	Eden Zangmo
Other awards
Best Ramp Walk	Tashi Choden
Best In Kira	Tashi Choden
Best in Evening Gown	Tashi Choden
Miss Talented	Sabina Subba
Miss Congeniality	Anita Limboo

=== Miss Bhutan International Pageants 2022 ===
Pageant	Contestant	Placement	Remarks
Miss Universe	Tashi Choden	Unplaced	
Miss Supermodel Worldwide	Devika Ghalley	Miss Intellectual	National Director of Miss Supermodel Bhutan
Miss Glam World	Jeechen Lhadree	2nd runner up	

=== Miss Bhutan Contestants 2022 ===
Contestant	HomeTown	Title/Award	Placement
1. Anita Limboo	Samtse	Miss Congeniality	Top 10
2. Chimi Yewong Dolma	Trongsa		
3. Dechen Pem	Haa		
4. Dema Wangmo	Chukha		
5. Devika Ghalley	Samtse		
6. Eden Zangmo	Trashigang	2nd Runner Up	Top 5
7. Jachen Ladree	Sarpang		Top 10
8. Karma Yangzom	Trashigang		
9. Kinley Choden	Lhuentse		
10. Lhakpa Dema	Wangdue		Top10
11. Namgay Wangmo	Chukha		Top 10
12. Nangsel C. Rigzang	Paro		
13. Phuntsho Seldon Wang	Thimphu		Top 5
14. Rinzin Wangmo	Trashiyangtse		
15. Sabina Subba	Tsirang	Miss Talented	
16. Miss Talented	Trashigang		Top 5
17. Sheela Giri	Samtse		
18. Sonam Choki	Bumthang		
19. Sonam Lhamo	Chukha		
20. Sonam Peldon	Wangdue	1st Runner Up	Top 5
21. Sonam Tshoso Tshering	Lhuentse		Top 10
22. Tandin Pem	Punakha		
23. Tandin Wangmo	Zhemgang		
24. Tashi Choden	Wangdue	Winner, Best in Kira, Best in Evening Gown, Best Ramp Walk	Top 5
25. Thinley Pem	Chukha		

== Miss Bhutan 2010 ==
=== Miss Bhutan 2010 Results ===
Final results	Contestants
Winner	Sonam Retty Choden
1st Runner Up	Kinley Yangden Dorji
2nd Runner Up	Tenzin Norden

=== Miss Bhutan 2010 Contestants ===
Contestant	Hometown	Award Title	Placement
1. Dawa Yangchen	Trashiyangtse	Miss Athlete	Top 10
2. Dechen Wangmo	Tsirang		Top 10
3. Dechen Tshomo	Wangdue Phodrang	3rd Runner Up	Top 5
4. Karma Loday Lhamo	Thimphu	Best Model	
5. Kinley Chezom	Samtse	Miss Personality	Top 10
6. Kinley Wangmo	Zhemgang	Miss Beautiful Hair	
7. Kinley Yangden Dorji	Thimphu	1st Runner Up Miss Talent	Top 5
8. Kinzang Choden	Bumthang	Miss Photogenic	Top 10
9. Namgay Dem	Sarpang		
10. Sangay Dema	Samtse	4th Runner up Miss Beautiful Skin	Top 5
11. Singye Dema	Wangdue	Best Model	
12. Sonam Retty Choden	Punakha	Winner	Top 5
13. Tashi Wangmo	Sarpang		
14. Tenzin Norden	Haa	2nd Runner Up	Top 5
15. Thinley Dema	Bumthang	Miss Congeniality	
16. Tshering Yangki	Trashiyangtse	Miss Beautiful Smile	
17. Tshering Zangmo	Bumthang	Miss Natural Beauty	Top 10
18. Ugyen Pema	Trashigang		

== Miss Bhutan 2008 ==
Miss Bhutan 2008 marked a significant milestone as Bhutan's inaugural national pageant. This event drew in women across the country to show off their talents which were viewed by thousands of women across the country, ushering in a new era in Bhutanese cultural and societal norms. Tsokye Tsomo Karchung emerged as the first-ever Miss Bhutan. She also took the title of Miss Photogenic and Miss Talent. Shelkar Choden was the 1st runner-up, while Tshering Pem was the 2nd runner-up.

The grand finale of Miss Bhutan 2008 was held on 10 October 2008 in the YDF Auditorium, the nations's biggest auditorium hall. The pageant was judged by five famous personalities and two international judges, Kelly Dorji, actor/model popular in Bollywood Film Industry and Charm Osathanond, Miss Thailand 2006.

Miss Bhutan represented Bhutan in Miss Earth 2008, Miss Young International in Taiwan, and Miss Safari 2008 in Kenya.

The Bhutan Information Communication and Media Authority (BICMA), Bhutan's media regulatory body did not allow the contest to use the Gross National Happiness tag, as they believed its use didn't correspond with beauty contests.

=== Miss Bhutan 2008 Results ===
Final result	Contestants
Winner	Tsokye Tsomo Karchung
1st Runner Up	Shelkar Choden
2nd Runner Up	Tshering Pem

=== Miss Bhutan International Pageants 2008 ===
Pageants	Contestant
Miss Earth (8th Edition)	Tsokye Tsomo Karchung
Miss Young International	Tsokye Tsomo Karchung
Miss Safari in Kenya	Tsokye Tsomo Karchung

=== Miss Bhutan 2008 Contestants ===
Age	Contestants	Age	Height	Hometown	Title/Award	Placement
1	Wangchuk Dema	18	173 cm (5 ft 8 in)	Samdrup Jongkhar, Bhutan	Miss Congeniality	
2	Ugyen Dema	19	180 cm (5 ft 11 in)	Thimphu, Bhutan		Top 10
3	Tsokye Tsomo Karchung	24	173 cm (5 ft 8 in)	Thimphu, Bhutan	Winner Miss Photogenic Miss Talent	WINNER
4	Tshering Zangmo	22	170 cm (5 ft 7 in)	Mongar, Bhutan		
5	Tshering Yangzom	20	170 cm (5 ft 7 in)	Trashigang, Bhutan	Miss Beautiful	Top 10
6	Tshering Pem	17	175 cm (5 ft 9 in)	Trashigang, Bhutan	2nd Runner Up	Top 5
7	Tashi Pelden	20	175 cm (5 ft 9 in)	Wangdue, Bhutan	3rd Runner Up	Top 5
8	Shelkar Choden	24	178 cm (5 ft 10 in)	Trongsa, Bhutan	1st Runner Up	Top 5
9	Nima Sangay	23	168 cm (5 ft 6 in)	Thimphu, Bhutan		
10	Pema Yeshi	21	170 cm (5 ft 7 in)	Bumthang, Bhutan		Top 10
11	Ngawang Choden	23	175 cm (5 ft 9 in)	Wangdue, Bhutan		Top 10
12	Neljor Wangmo	18	165 cm (5 ft 5 in)	Lhuntse, Bhutan		
13	Kinga Wangmo	19	180 cm (5 ft 11 in)	Paro, Bhutan	4th Runner Up	Top 5
14	Kinga Om	18	163 cm (5 ft 4 in)	Thimphu, Bhutan		
15	Kezang Chhoden	18	168 cm (5 ft 6 in)	Thimphu, Bhutan		
16	Karma Zam	22	175 cm (5 ft 9 in)	Paro, Bhutan	Best Model	Top 10
17	Karma Choki	19	165 cm (5 ft 5 in)	Samdrup Jongkhar, Bhutan		
18	Jamyang Zangmo	26	168 cm (5 ft 6 in)	Trashigang, Bhutan		
19	Deki Choden Namgyel	23	165 cm (5 ft 5 in)	Trashigang, Bhutan		
