= Binibining Pilipinas 2008 =

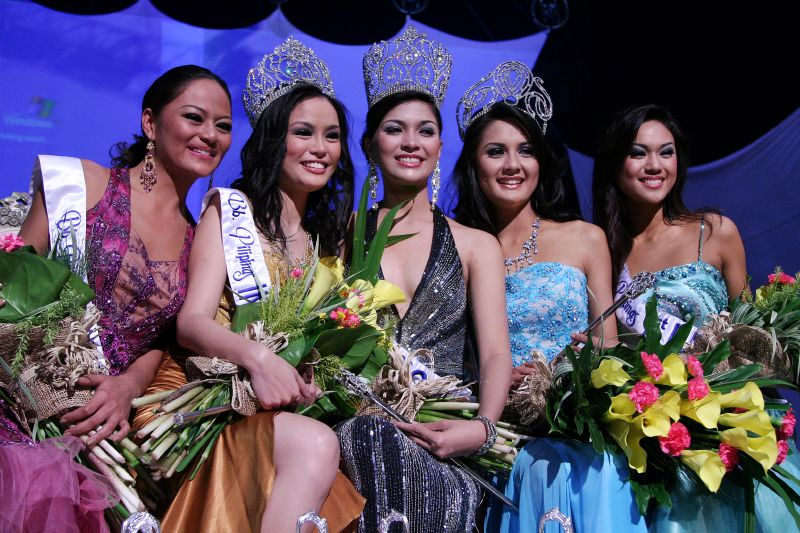
- Binibining Pilipinas 2008 winners from left to right: Elizabeth Jacqueline Nacuspag (2nd Runner-Up), Patricia Fernandez (International), Janina San Miguel (World), Jennifer Barrientos (Universe), and Danielle Castaño (1st Runner-Up).
- Date: March 8, 2008
- Presenters: Paolo Bediones; Charlene Gonzales; Precious Lara Quigaman
- Entertainment: Alfred Vargas; Paolo Paraiso; Marco Alcaraz
- Venue: Araneta Coliseum, Quezon City, Philippines
- Broadcaster: GMA Network (local); GMA Pinoy TV (international)
- Entrants: 24
- Placements: 10
- Winner: Jennifer Barrientos; San Mateo, Rizal
- Congeniality: Evangeline Mae Castillo; Tarlac City
- Photogenic: Danielle Castaño; Quezon City

Binibining Pilipinas 2008 was the 45th edition of Binibining Pilipinas. It took place at the Smart Araneta Coliseum in Quezon City, Metro Manila, Philippines on March 8, 2008.

At the end of the event, Anna Teresa Licaros crowned Jennifer Barrientos as Binibining Pilipinas Universe 2008, Margaret Wilson crowned Janina San Miguel as Binibining Pilipinas World 2008, and Nadia Lee Cien Shami crowned Patricia Fernandez as Binibining Pilipinas International 2008. Danielle Castaño was named First Runner-Up and Elizabeth Jacqueline Nacuspag was named 2nd Runner-Up.

For personal reasons including the death of her grandfather, Janina San Miguel resigned her title as Binibining Pilipinas World 2008 in September 2008. The title was automatically transferred to the first runner-up, Danielle Castaño who went on to represent the Philippines at the Miss World 2008 pageant.

== Results ==
=== Placements ===
Color keys

- The contestant was a Semi-Finalist in an International pageant.
- The contestant was not able to compete in an International pageant.
- The contestant did not place.

Placement	Contestant	International Placement
Binibining Pilipinas Universe 2008	Bb. #7 – Jennifer Barrientos	Unplaced – Miss Universe 2008
Binibining Pilipinas World 2008	Bb. #15 – Janina San Miguel	Resigned due to personal issues
Binibining Pilipinas International 2008	Bb. #2 – Patricia Isabel Fernandez	Top 15 – Miss International 2008
1st runner-up	Bb. #8 – Danielle Kirsten Muriel Castaño (Appointed as Binibining Pilipinas World 2008)	Unplaced – Miss World 2008
2nd runner-up	Bb. #18 – Elizabeth Jacqueline Nacuspag	
Top 10	Bb. #3 – Toni Alyessa Hipolito; Bb. #9 – Kathleen Phyllis Guerrero; Bb. #12 – Jaysel Arrozal; Bb. #13 – Tabetha Jo Frick; Bb. #14 – Karen Golar	

=== Special awards ===
Award	Contestant	Ref.
Miss Photogenic	Bb. #8 – Danielle Castaño	
Miss Talent	Bb. #24 – Rizza Liz Mondia Catigan	
Miss Friendship	Bb. #6 – Evangeline Mae Agustin Castillo	
Best In Swimsuit	Bb. #15 – Janina San Miguel	
Best In Long Gown	Bb. #15 – Janina San Miguel	
Miss Bacchus Energy Drink	Bb. #8 – Danielle Castaño	
Manila Bulletin Reader's Choice	Bb. #20 – Roxanne Tadique	
Miss Philippine Airlines	Bb. #8 – Danielle Castaño	
Miss Ever Bilena	Bb. #8 – Danielle Castaño	
Miss Natasha	Bb. #2 – Patricia Fernandez	
Miss Natasha Poise and Grace	Bb. #8 – Danielle Castaño	

== Judges ==
- Joseph Bernardo – Philippine Ambassador to Spain
- Kristie Kenney – Ambassador Extraordinary and Plenipotentiary Embassy of the United States
- Makoto Katsura – Ambassador Extraordinary and Plenipotentiary Embassy of Japan
- Feliciano Belmonte, Jr. – Quezon City mayor
- Vijay Mallya – Chairman United Breweries Group / Kingfisher Airlines
- Jean Moueix – Chateau Petrus
- Vivienne Tan – Founder, Entrepreneurs School of Asia
- Oscar S. Salvacion – President Sofitel Philippine Plaza
- Marian Rivera – Actress, Ramp and Commercial Model
- Dennis Trillo – Multi-awarded Matinee Idol and Commercial Model
- Chris Tiu – TV Host

== Contestants ==
24 contestants competed for the three titles.

No.	Contestant	Age	Hometown	Notes
1	Eizza Rancesca Lim	23	Cainta, Rizal	Mutya ng Pilipinas 2004 1st runner-up
2	Patricia Isabel Fernandez	22	Pasig	
3	Toni Alyessa Hipolito	18	Quezon City	
4	Karla Paula Henry	21	Cebu City	
5	Maria Kristelle Lazaro	22	Daraga	
6	Evangeline Mae Castillo	24	Tarlac City	
7	Jennifer Barrientos	22	San Mateo, Rizal	
8	Danielle Kirsten Muriel Castaño	18	Quezon City	
9	Kathleen Phyllis Guerrero	25	Quezon City	
10	Arvin Gail Arriola	17	Bulacan	
11	Gianni Michelle Laudato	24	Bacoor, Cavite	
12	Jaysel Arrozal	17	Valenzuela	
13	Tabetha Jo Frick	17	Camarines Sur	
14	Karen Golar	24	Bayawan	
15	Janina San Miguel	17	Quezon City	
16	Margarita Gutierrez	24	Manila	
17	Lady Lou Garidan	21	Cotabato	
18	Elizabeth Jacqueline Nacuspag	24	Quezon City	
19	Patricia Fry Francisco	17	Ilocos Sur	
20	Roxanne Tadique	21	Quezon City	
21	Karla Cristina Garcia	21	Marilao, Bulacan	
22	Maria Anne Kathleen Labung	22	Pampanga	
23	Agatha Fontanilla	21	Catarman, Northern Samar	
24	Rizza Liz Catigan	21	Bacolod	

== Notes ==
=== Post-pageant notes ===
- Jennifer Barrientos competed at Miss Universe 2008 in Nha Trang, Vietnam but was unplaced. Danielle Castaño was also unplaced when she competed at Miss World 2008 in Johannesburg. On the other hand, Patricia Fernandez was one of the twelve semifinalists when she competed at Miss International 2008 in Macau.
- Both Karla Henry and Maria Kristelle Lazaro competed at Miss Philippines Earth 2008. Lazaro was crowned Miss Philippines Fire 2008, and while Henry won the Miss Philippines Earth 2008 title. Henry then competed Miss Earth 2008 in Angeles City and won. She was also won the Miss Photogenic Award and the Miss Earth Designers Award.
