= Miss Philippines Earth 2009 =

9th Miss Philippines Earth pageant

- Date: May 10, 2009
- Presenters: Billy Crawford; Nikki Gil
- Venue: Filoil EcoOil Centre, San Juan, Metro Manila, Philippines
- Broadcaster: ABS-CBN; The Filipino Channel
- Entrants: 50
- Placements: 10
- Winner: Sandra Seifert; Negros Occidental
- Congeniality: Kirstie Joan Babor; Alegria
- Photogenic: Jane Annalyn Sy; Cainta

Miss Philippines Earth 2009 was the ninth Miss Philippines Earth pageant, held at the Filoil EcoOil Centre in San Juan, Philippines, on May 10, 2009.

At the end of the event, Karla Henry of Cebu crowned Sandra Seifert of Negros Occidental as her successor. Seifert represented the Philippines in the Miss Earth 2009.

== Results ==
=== Placements ===
| Placement | Contestant |
|---|---|
| Miss Philippines Earth 2009 | Negros Occidental – Sandra Seifert |
| Miss Philippines Air 2009 | Aklan – Michelle Braun |
| Miss Philippines Water 2009 | Sydney – Catherine Loyola |
| Miss Philippines Fire 2009 | Quezon City – Patricia Tumulak |
| Miss Philippines Eco Tourism 2009 | Victorias – Grezilda Adelantar |
| Runners-Up | Alegria, Cebu – Kirstie Joan Babor ∞; Apalit – Vanessa Marie Johnson; Bataan – Monique Teruelle Manuel; Canada – Tessa Kruger; Manila – Alexis Go |

∞ – Loyola resigned as Miss Philippines Water 2009. Due to protocol, one of the runners-up, Kirstie Joan Babor, assumed the Miss Philippines Water title.

=== Special Titles ===
| Title | Contestant |
|---|---|
| Miss PAGCOR | Victorias – Grezilda Adelantar |
| Miss Science and Technology | Quezon City – Patricia Tumulak |

=== Special awards ===
Press Releases

| Special Award | Represents | Delegate |
|---|---|---|
| Best in Swimsuit | Negros Occidental | Sandra Seifert |
| Best in Long Gown | Canada (Fil.) | Tessa Kruger |
| Miss Photogenic | Cainta | Jane Annalyn Sy |
| Miss Talent | Olongapo | Angelee delos Reyes |
| Miss Congeniality | Alegria | Kirstie Joan Babor |
| Best in Cultural Attire | Negros Occidental | Sandra Seifert |
| Gandang Ricky Reyes Awardee | Negros Occidental | Sandra Seifert |
| Miss Ever Bilena | Cainta | Jane Annalyn Sy |
| Miss RCBC-e-Woman | Negros Occidental | Sandra Seifert |
| Miss Golden Sunset | Pasay | Karryl Ann Lopez |
| Miss Magnolia Ice Cream | Sydney (Fil.) | Catherine Loyola |
| Face Of The New Placenta | Victorias | Grezilda Adelantar |

Major Awards
Minor/Sponsor Awards

== Contestants ==
Here are the 50 contestants that competed for the title Miss Philippines Earth 2009:

| Represented | Contestant | Age (Note: Ages at the time of the Pageant.) |
|---|---|---|
| Aklan | Michelle Braun | 18 |
| Alegria | Kirstie Joan Babor | 22 |
| Antipolo | Czarina Mae Justo | 23 |
| Apalit | Vanessa Johnson | 22 |
| Bacolod | Jan Maricris Vega | 18 |
| Badoc | Jinky Janelle Miranda | 21 |
| Baguio | Maria Raenalyn Guansing | 21 |
| Bataan | Monique Teruelle Manuel | 20 |
| Batangas City | Jennelyn Bagsit | 20 |
| Biñan | Joanne Principio | 18 |
| Bulacan | Cherry Mae de Guzman | 18 |
| Bustos | Joanna Krizel Tuazon | 20 |
| Cabusao | Arianne Natalie Lim | 23 |
| Cagayan de Oro | Stephanie Kate Cawaling | 23 |
| Cainta | Jane Annalyn Sy | 20 |
| Calamba | Kathrina Camille Suarez | 19 |
| Catarman | Rochelle Cadiente | 19 |
| Canada | Tessa Kruger | 21 |
| Melbourne | Tanya Louise Hendy | 23 |
| Sydney | Catherine Loyola | 23 |
| West Coast | Charmaine Chiong | 24 |
| Ilocos Sur | Paula Camille Figueras | 22 |
| Las Piñas | Elizabeth Naluz | 18 |
| Liliw | Barbie Sauquillo | 23 |
| Lipa | Reina Mae Maerina | 23 |
| Los Baños | Shiella Mae Botones | 19 |
| Lumban | Shienneth Navarro | 25 |
| Malolos | Kenneth Shane Dimaapi | 19 |
| Manila | Alexis Go | 20 |
| Marikina | Elaine Paola Esteban | 21 |
| Mexico | Agnes Dizon | 25 |
| Meycauayan | Nickah dela Cruz | 18 |
| Midsayap | Leah Sarah Baranaskas | 18 |
| Negros Occidental | Sandra Inez Seifert | 25 |
| Olongapo | Angelee Claudett delos Reyes | 21 |
| Ozamiz | Wendie Olape | 24 |
| Pagsanjan | Alexandra Santos | 18 |
| Palawan | Christine Barby Loreno | 20 |
| Pasay | Karryl Ann Lopez | 21 |
| Passi | Jo-nah Belle Capuy | 18 |
| Puerto Princesa | Maria Theresa Arzaga | 21 |
| Quezon City | Patricia Marie Tumulak | 21 |
| Romblon | Reina Cuneta | 22 |
| San Antonio | Carriza Senoc | 18 |
| San Juan | Patricia Mae Sta. Rosa | 18 |
| San Pedro | Maria Melissa Lim | 25 |
| Santa Rosa | Carl Crystle delos Reyes | 19 |
| Sorsogon | Kathleen Jebulan | 23 |
| Tarlac City | Evangeline Mae Castillo | 25 |
| Victorias | Grezilda Adelantar | 21 |

== Judges ==
| # | Judge | Background |
|---|---|---|
| 1 | Cindy Ejercito | Beauty queen: winner of 1987 Miss Model of the World (Turkey edition) and 1988 Mutya ng Pilipinas, chairman of the board of judges of Miss Philippines Earth 2009 |
| 2 | Marlo Mendoza | Environmental advocate, chairman of Forest Management Bureau (FMB) of the Philippine Department of Environment and Natural Resources |
| 3 | Jake Macapagal | International stage actor and television actor |
| 4 | Ginger Conejero | Miss Philippines Air 2006, TV Patrol World Star Patrol patroller |
| 5 | Hong Jin | general manager of Korean Air |
| 6 | Precious Lara Quigaman | Fashion model, television host, actress, and beauty queen; she won the Binibining Pilipinas 2005 as representative to the Miss International and eventually, she won the Miss International 2005. She is also the founder of Turismo Filipina Charities. |
| 7 | John Cenica | Cosmetic surgeon and president of Jancen Cosmetic Surgery Company |
| 8 | Rowena Jamaji | International businesswoman based in Dubai |
| 9 | Graciano Yumul | Undersecretary for Research and Development of the Philippine Department of Science and Technology |
| 10 | Amina Aranaz | Model, journalist/columnist, apparel designer, and president of Philippine School of Fashion and Arts. |
| 11 | Erwin Genuino | Environmentalist, lawyer, and president of Trace College in the Philippines. |
| 12 | Leandro Enriquez | Founder of Mutya ng Pilipinas and Miss Asia Pacific International beauty pageants and president and chief executive officer of Sulo Hotel |

== Environmental activities ==
| Date | Activity | Details |
|---|---|---|
| March 21, 2009 | Grand March versus Illegal Drugs | Twelve of the official 50 candidates of Miss Philippines Earth 2009 participated in the Grand March versus Illegal Drugs, which was held along Roxas Boulevard, Philippines. The President of the Philippines, Gloria Macapagal Arroyo led the march which started from the Cultural Center of the Philippines and proceeded to Rajah Sulayman Park and eventually to the Quirino Grandstand to complete the 2.5 km. trek. The event was recorded in the Guinness World Records as the "Largest March Against Illegal Drugs." |
| March 28, 2009 | Earth Hour 2009 | Eleven of the official candidates of Miss Philippines 2009 along with 2 reigning Miss Philippines winners, Miss Philippines Air Marie Razel Eguia and Miss Philippines Water Marian Michelle Oblea attended the press conference of Earth Hour that took place at the Bonifacio High Street at The Fort, Taguig, Metro Manila. Nearly 4,000 cities and towns in 88 countries took part in the Earth Hour, an effort to call attention to climate change. The Philippines topped the Earth Hour 2009 participation as 647 cities and towns or over 15 million Filipinos were estimated to have participated according to the World Wildlife Fund, which sponsored the event and called on cities to dim nonessential lights from 8:30 to 9:30 pm. |
| March 31, 2009 | Climate Change 101 | The delegates of Miss Philippines-Earth attended a workshop-seminar called "A Climate Change 101" by the Miss Earth Foundation's executive director, Catherine Untalan at the Carousel Gardens. |
| April 3, 2009 | Rags 2 Riches | The delegates went on an "I love My Planet Community Tour" and learned more about the story behind the success of "Rags2Riches" who does not only help minimize the garbage problem but also uplifts the quality of lives of the women in Payatas. "Rags 2 Riches" gave the talk in the School of Fashion, which include fashionable bags made of garment discards. |
| April 14, 2009 | Green Lifestyle | An environmental seminar held at the Eco-Academy Multi-Purpose Hall of the La Mesa Eco-Park, where the delegates learned on how to live the "Green Lifestyle" which conducted by Gawad Kalinga and Human Heart Nature, a line of 100% chemical free, 100% Philippine ingredients and 100% organic personal care products. Another seminar-workshop with Bangon Kalikasan Movement conducted about Solid Waste Management based on the almost decade old law, Republic Act of the Philippines 9003. The delegates brought their own reusable utensils and refillable water bottles to realize how they can minimize their waste with simple acts. Sustainable Energy Development Program and the United States Agency for International Development facilitated fun-filled activities for the 50 candidates. |
| April 15, 2009 | Stop Car Fumes | The delegates led the delegation of Makati for the annual "Tigil Buga Movement" or "Stop Car Fumes." On its 3rd year, participants asked the motorists along Ayala Avenue and Paseo de Roxas to shut off their engines for 5 minutes, 4 minutes longer than the traditional 1-minute shut-off. Miss Earth 2008 Karla Henry and her Philippine court entertained the kids afterwards with a storytelling session of the story, Bakawan. This is in partnership with the City Government of Makati. |
| April 17, 2009 | Clean and Green | KILUS Foundation in Ugong, Pasig was the destination of the delegates for its "2nd I Love My Planet Earth Community Tour." The delegates toured around the cleanest, greenest, and most progressive barangay in the said city. The delegates also had the chance to witness how doy packs were transformed into beautiful bags by the women of the community. |
| April 18, 2009 | Earth Day Activities | A group of delegates also participated in the different Earth Day Activities of the People Management Association of the Philippines at the Quezon Memorial Circle for the "3rd I Love My Planet Earth Community Tour." The tour was continued in Mandaluyong on its 4th stop on April 20, 2009. |
| April 19, 2009 | Tour of the Fireflies | The Miss Earth Foundation conducted a 40-kilometer bike ride, entitled, "Tour of the Fireflies 2009." The delegates bring out their bikes to campaign for clean air and healthy lifestyle. |
| April 22, 2009 | Pollution-free Motorcade | A clean air campaign by Miss Earth Foundation together with Green Independent Power Producers, leaders of the Electric Jeepneys have a pollution-free motorcade to jumpstart the Earth Day celebration from the Mall of Asia to Quezon City Circle. It aimed to call the attention of the public to switch to cleaner transportation alternatives and technologies. The Miss Earth Foundation and Miss Philippines Earth 2009 delegates also participated in the activities spearheaded by the Department of Environment and Natural Resources in the afternoon. Candidates and reigning queens visited the Echo Store at 4 pm in Serendra, Taguig to learn more about environmental and social enterprises and organic products available in the market for the "5th I Love My Planet Earth Community Tour." |
| April 23, 2009 | Fluvial Parade | The delegates left the Metropolitan Manila to visit the Municipality of Hagonoy for several activities that included a "Fluvial Parade" and Memorandum of Agreement for the planting of 2,000 mangrove seedlings in the place. |
| April 24–28, 2009 | Smokey Mountain | The delegates will tour at Bahay Toro, Quezon City and on April 28, at Smokey Mountain with the supervision of environmental priest, Fr. Ben Beltran who is the instrumental in the construction of the Eco-Church in the said area. |
| April 29, 2009 | Going Back to Traditional Bag Campaign | "Magbalik Bayong Campaign" or "Going Back to Traditional Bag" was launched in Cainta, Rizal on April 29 for a Market Tour to promote the campaign of the use of "bayong." Bayong is simple woven flat basket or bag made of buri, bamboo, or rattan strips. |
| April 30, 2009 | Bakawan | The delegates visited the Gawad Kalinga Village in Taguig for storytelling session of Bakawan with the children. Bakawan is a pro-environment book, written by Catherine Untalan, executive director of Miss Earth Foundation and Reena Sarmiento, Miss Philippines Eco Tourism 2006. The book aimed to teach children about taking care of the environment, particularly the importance of bakawan or mangroves. |

== 2009 Lil' Earth Angels ==
Miss Lil' Earth Angels 2009 is the third edition of Miss Lil' Earth Angels pageant, the younger version of the Miss Philippines Earth beauty pageant. The finale of Miss Lil' Earth Angels for 2009 was held at the Robinsons Galleria in Quezon City, Philippines on April 24, 2009.

=== Results ===
| Final results | Contestant |
|---|---|
| Lil' Earth Angel | Ivy Yvon Vibandor |
| Lil' Earth Angel-Air | Jackieleen Crisostomo |
| Lil' Earth Angel-Water | Maria Carmen Solis |
| Lil' Earth Angel-Fire | Carla Tobias |
| Lil' Earth Angel-Eco Tourism | Atascha Chloe Mercado |
| Lil' Earth Angel-Beauty for a Cause | Zara Chanel Arguelles |
