= Rampa Drag Club =

LGBT nightclub in Quezon City, Metro Manila, Philippines

- Interactive map of Rampa Drag Club
- Address: 40 Scout Albano Ave; Quezon City, Metro Manila; Philippines
- Coordinates: 14.638457039629493°N 121.03878843659723°E
- Type: Nightclub

Construction
- Opened: 10 February 2024

Rampa Drag Club, or simply known as Rampa (stylized in all uppercase), is an LGBT-friendly nightclub venue located in Quezon City, Metro Manila.

== History ==
RS Francisco, Ice Seguerra, and Liza Diño collaborated to create a new business venture, a nightclub venue dedicated to the entertainment of drag. Later on, they partnered up with Cecille Bravo and Loui Cabel to gain knowledge in the nightclub industry. They have also invited drag performers Precious Paula Nicole, Viñas DeLuxe, and Brigiding, to be on the board of directors.

A press conference was held at the Karma Lounge on 6 January 2024, where the owners showcased their business venture, Rampa Drag Club. Seguerra explained the nightclub is for drag performers "to grow and strive and they're also being respected as [...] artists." Precious Paula Nicole showed her excitement "from being a performer in drag clubs, then as a contestant on a reality show, I can't believe that now I will be a co-owner of my own drag club and nurture our baby drag queens."

The nightclub venue was later established in Quezon City, with a soft-opening on 17 January 2024; the building spans about 800 square meters. The next day, drag performer Manila Luzon had various viewing parties set up at the nightclub hosted by previous contestants of a pageantry series. The grand opening was on 10 February 2024, with Vice Ganda visiting to see the ribbon-cutting ceremony and performances.

== Shows and offerings ==
Paulo Castro and Darryl Reciña led a weekly event for the nightclub being named "Watermelon" or "Pakuwan" where it feels "fresh" and "politically charged". The first event opened on 3 May 2024, co-hosted by Salmo Nella and Sexy Wanda Mina, with J Quinn announced as a special guest.

== Notable performers ==
Janina San Miguel, a former beauty queen, was invited to the drag nightclub and recreated her viral question and answer portion from the 2008 Binibining Pilipinas in January 2024. A viewing party and performance occurred in March 2024 with the line-up being Nymphia Wind, Crystal Methyd, and Marina Summers; it was later announced that Anetra is included the performance. Two months later, the nightclub launched "Watermelon" where girl group Bini made an appearance and performed their song, "Salamin, Salamin".

== See also ==
- LGBT culture in the Philippines
