= Patricia Tumulak =

Filipina actress and model

- Born: Edda Patricia Marie Giselle Gomez-Tumulak; Quezon City, Metro Manila, Philippines
- Occupations: Beauty Queen, Actress, Host
- Beauty pageant titleholder
- Title: Miss Philippines-Fire 2009
- Years active: 2009–present
- Major competitions: Miss Philippines Earth 2009 (Miss Philippines-Fire); Binibining Pilipinas 2011 (Top 15)

Edda Patricia Marie Giselle Gomez-Tumulak (Tagalog pronunciation: [ˈgɔmɛs tuˈmulak]) is a Filipino beauty pageant titleholder and actress. She came from a large family with a Filipino, Japanese and Spanish lineage from the Visayas region. She currently resides in Quezon City, Metro Manila.

== Personal life and education ==
Patricia Marie Gomez Tumulak graduated with a Degree of Bachelor of Science in Child Development and Education Minor in Special Education. Prior to joining Miss Philippines Earth 2009, she went to a public school and did some voluntary teaching. She is planning to take up her Masters in Special Education and dreams of building her own pre-school.

== Miss Philippines Earth 2009 ==
Tumulak joined the national Miss Philippines Earth 2009 beauty pageant, which was contested by 50 delegates representing various towns, cities, provinces, and overseas Filipino communities in the beauty contest that promotes environmental awareness.

In the final competition of the Miss Philippines Earth 2009, she was announced as one of the 10 semi-finalists who moved forward to compete for the title. She achieved one of the five highest scores in the swimsuit and evening gown competitions for her stage chops, which advanced her as one of the top five finalists to participate in the final round of the event.

At the conclusion of the pageant, she received the Miss Science and Technology award and was crowned Miss Philippines Fire 2009. She was crowned by the outgoing titleholder Kristelle Lazaro at The Arena Entertainment and Recreational Center of the People, San Juan, Philippines.

== Binibining Pilipinas 2011 ==
Tumulak competed at the Binibining Pilipinas 2011 pageant where she was chosen as one of the Top 15 semifinalists.

Miss Multiverse International 2014 She was appointed and given the title of Miss Multiverse Philippines 2014 and represented the Philippines at the Miss Multiverse International 2014 pageant on November 24 in Punta Cana, Dominican Republic.

== Filmography ==
=== Television / Digital Series ===
Year	Program	Role	Notes
2009	Miss Philippines Earth 2009	Herself	as contestant Miss Philippines Fire (third runner-up), Miss Science and Technology
2011	Binibining Pilipinas 2011	Herself	as contestant Top 15 finalist
2015–2017	Eat Bulaga!	Herself	as co-host on various segments As model and Ursula's friend on Kalyeserye
2015; 2025	24 Oras	Herself	as Chika Minute relief anchor
2016	Walang Kapalit	Melly	Eat Bulaga! Lenten Special
2016	Calle Siete	Patring	1st Daytime acting on TV
2017	Pagpapatawad	Marife Peña	Eat Bulaga! Lenten Special
2017	I Heart Davao	Maxine "Max" San Agustin	Guest Antagonist
2018	Super Ma'am	Black Super Ma'am	Guest Antagonist
2018	Contessa	Atty. Marga Antonio	Guest Protagonist
2018	Wowowin	Herself	Co-host
2019	Inagaw na Bituin	Queenie Belardo	Supporting Cast / Antagonist
2019	Hanggang sa Dulo ng Buhay Ko	Michelle	Special Guest
2019–2021	Magkaagaw	Gilda Razon	Supporting Cast / Antagonist / Protagonist
2021–2023	Dapat Alam Mo!	Herself	Co-host
2023	Unica Hija	TV host	Special Guest
2023	Magandang Dilag	Tess	Special Guest
2024	Si Manoy ang Ninong Ko	Host	
2024	Black Rider	Frances	
2024–2025	Forever Young	Olga	Special Guest / Antagonist / Anti-Hero
2025	Mommy Dearest	Leticia	Special Guest / Antagonist / Anti-Hero
2025–2026	Encantadia Chronicles: Sang'gre	Erenea	Special Guest
2025	Akusada	Atty. Allison Dela Cruz	Special Guest
2026	House of Lies	Lalaine	Supporting Cast

Awards and achievements
Preceded by Kristelle Lazaro	Miss Philippines-Fire; 2009	Succeeded by Gwennaelle Ruais
