= Miriam Odemba =

Tanzanian model (born 1982)

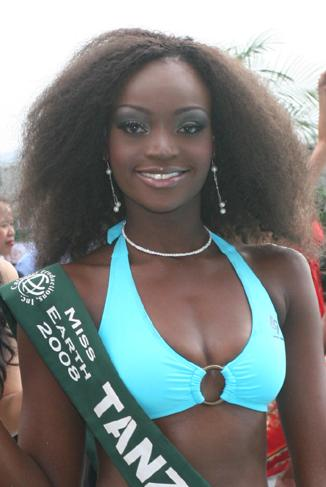
- Born: Miriam Odemba; 19 February 1982 (age 44); Arusha, Tanzania
- Height: 1.75 m (5 ft 9 in)
- Beauty pageant titleholder
- Hair color: Brown
- Eye color: Brown
- Major competitions: Miss Temeke 1997; Miss Tanzania 1998 (Top 10); M-Net Face of Africa 1998 (Top 5); Elite Model Look 1999 (Top 17); Miss Earth Tanzania 2008 (Winner); Miss Earth 2008 (Miss Earth – Air)

Miriam Odemba (born 19 February 1982) (Note: her exact birthdate according to some sources) (from Arusha, Tanzania) is a Tanzanian model and beauty pageant titleholder. She started her modeling career at an early age and gained fame when she won the Miss Temeke title in 1997. The following year, aged 19, she took part in the Miss East Africa 1998 pageant and in the modeling competition M-Net Face of Africa 1998, becoming a runner up. She later participated in the 1999 Elite Model Look contest and Miss Earth 2008 where she was crowned as Miss Earth – Air 2008.

At 13, her life was tough and her parents had to move to their uncle's. She always wondered what life was all about then. As she grew older, she perceived God's message of love and started appreciating everything around her, especially the nature, God's greatest gift.

The path to success for Miriam started back in 1997 when she first competed in a local beauty pageant Miss Temeke, aged 17. She went on to compete nationally for the Miss Tanzania crown but ended up in the Top 10 and was not able to win the crown. The Story behind, was she was looking tall, beautiful and matured enough, but not yet 18, thus, after some carefully consideration, was not eligible to contend for Miss Tanzania. In the Top-10 list, her name was eliminated before the finals. (Regardles as only few knew this incident then, until discussed later by herself in a media Interview at Wasafi FM Radio on 2021). However this was not the end but the beginning for her who tried her luck at several beauty pageants including Miss East Africa in 1998. However Miriam Odemba got her break at the end of 1998 when she took part in an African regional model search – Mnet Face of Africa 1998 and becoming one of the runners-up. In 1999, aged about 20, she was selected as Elite Model Look Tanzania, and competed at Elite Model Look 1999 in Nice, France placing among the Top 17 and also got an exclusive contract with Elite Model Management in New York city. However, due to personal problems and the sudden loss of her manager Amina Mongi, her contract with Elite ended up without implementation.

Miriam struck out on a new path in entertainment and worked briefly in modeling and dancing in China and she also took part in the Miss Kite beauty pageant in 2001. Despite Not winning, she later she launched her modeling career in Europe and Asia.

== Miss Earth 2008 ==
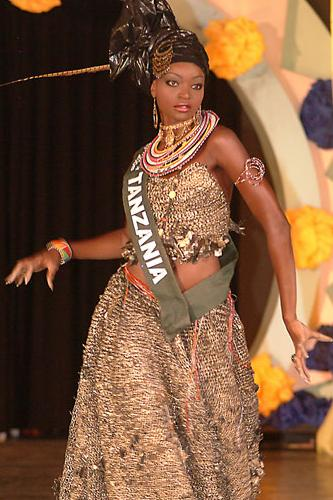
Miriam Odemba during the National Costume Parade of Miss Earth 2008

In the final competition of the eighth edition of the international beauty pageant Miss Earth, Odemba was announced as one of sixteen semi-finalists who would move forward to compete for the title. She achieved one of the eight highest scores in the swimsuit competition for her stage chops, which advanced her as one of the top eight finalists to participate in the evening gown competition. She then pulled away for the lead as she articulated in her video interview about environmental concerns as a key issue in her country, in which she advanced to the top four.

In the last round, the court of four were asked one question, “What would you tell US president-elect Barack Obama about the state of the global environment if ever you were to meet him?” She placed the second highest score in the interview round and at the conclusion of the competition, she was crowned Miss Earth Air.

A parade and press conference were given for winning Miss Earth Air 2008. The Miss Earth pageant was held on November 9, 2008, at the Clark Expo Amphitheater in Angeles, Pampanga, Philippines. Eighty-five delegates arrived from October 19, 2008, in the Philippines. The pageant was broadcast live via ABS-CBN in the Philippines and to many countries worldwide via Star World, The Filipino Channel and other partner networks.

Odemba's closest friend among the Miss Earth 2008 top four runner-up winners—named after the four elements—is her pageant roommate Karla Henry, Miss Earth 2008 from the Philippines. They plan to climb Mount Kilimanjaro together.

Miriam Odemba Foundation (MOF)

Since its inception in August 2019, the Miriam Odemba Foundation (MOF) has been deeply involved in numerous volunteer initiatives, dedicated to making a tangible difference in communities.

On her several interviews with the media, Miriam Odemba proclaimed continue her journey of impact, serving as a journal documenting the initiatives undertaken by the foundation to a Girl Child and Women in the area.

Having its offices in France and East Africa, the foundation works tirelessly on organizing events promoting self-awareness among young girls to advocating against Gender Based Violence, and its steadfast commitment to positive change.

Miriam Odemba has been engaging with students on educational matters, providing support to individuals facing challenges such as spinal bifida, and extending charity to vulnerable women in the rural communities.

In a significant turn of events, the Foundation has managed to surpas her wishes, Anjali Borkhataria, a young designer rapidly gaining fame, has been named an ambassador for the Miriam Odemba Foundation on 2024. This appointment follows her expressed wish to design for Her Excellency Hon. Samia Suluhu Hassan, a desire that garnered significant attention on a youth media show and social media. The wish received a tentative nod from the President herself, adding to Anjali's growing acclaim.

Sauti ya Mitindo (SAYAMI)

Miriam has just unveiled the event, dubbed “Sauti ya Mitindo” (Voice of Fashion), which drew a dynamic mix of Tanzania's fashion veterans and rising stars, sparking conversations on how the industry can grow sustainably and inclusively.

The event, premiered on 9 August 2025, made a platform that celebrates beauty, develops fashion, and promotes African heritage globally. among all, beneficiaries are local Tanzanian Models, designers, emerging talents, students, experts and professionals, entrepreneurs, journalists, and other stakeholders in fashion, beauty, and creativity in the country.

Miriam Odemba's Sauti ya Mitindo has been prescribed as a movement, redefining Tanzanian fashion’s future with style, heart, and unwavering vision.

== Notes ==
Preceded by (Tanzania) Angel Delight Kileo	Miss Tanzania Earth; 2008	Succeeded by Evelyne Almasi
Preceded by (India) Pooja Chitgopekar	Miss Earth-Air; 2008	Succeeded by (Philippines) Sandra Seifert
