= Shassia Ubillús =

Panamanian model and beauty pageant titleholder

- Born: Shassia Ubillus Falcón; 1983 (age 42–43); Panama City, Panama
- Height: 1.72 m (5 ft 7 1/2 in)
- Beauty pageant titleholder
- Title: Miss Panamá Earth 2008
- Hair color: Brown
- Eye color: Brown
- Major competitions: Miss International Panamá 2008 (1st Runner-Up), Miss Earth 2008 (Best National Costume), Miss Caraïbes Hibiscus.

Shassia Ubillus Falcón (born 1983) is a Panamanian model and beauty pageant titleholder who represented the Panamá Province in the Miss International Panamá 2008 pageant in June 2008, was the 1st runner-up and acquired the title of Miss Panamá Earth 2008.

Ubillus who is 5 ft 7.9 in (1.72 m) tall, represented her country Panama in the 2008 Miss Earth beauty pageant, in Pampanga, Philippines on November 9, 2008. She won the Best National Costume.

She also won the titles Miss Fitness and Miss Slim of Miss International Panamá 2008 pageant by Alejandra Arias who represented Panama in Miss International 2008. She later represented Panama in the contest Miss Caraïbes Hibiscus in Saint Martin.

Awards and achievements
Preceded by Nadege Herrera	Miss Panamá Earth; 2008	Succeeded by Geraldine Higuera
