= Bianca Manalo =

Filipina actress

- Born: Pamela Bianca Ramos Manalo; November 28, 1986 (age 39); Parañaque, Philippines
- Education: Assumption College San Lorenzo (Advertising)
- Occupations: Actress; TV host
- Height: 180 cm (71 in)
- Beauty pageant titleholder
- Title: Binibining Pilipinas Universe 2009
- Agency: Star Magic (2010–2022); Sparkle (2022–present)
- Years active: 2009–present
- Major competitions: Binibining Pilipinas 2009 (Winner – Binibining Pilipinas Universe 2009); Miss Universe 2009 (Unplaced)

Pamela Bianca Ramos Manalo (born November 28, 1986) is a Filipino actress and beauty pageant titleholder. She was the Binibining Pilipinas Universe 2009 winner, and represented the Philippines at Miss Universe 2009, but she was unplaced.

In October 2010, she was cast in the ABS-CBN television series Juanita Banana on a title role until the show ended in February 2011. In February 2012, she became the first Asian woman to become an endorser of L'Oreal Matrix.

== Family and personal life ==
Manalo has two American and Filipino bloodlines. She is the sister of Miss World 2002 Top 10 Finalist Katherine Anne Manalo and Binibining Pilipinas 2016/Miss Globe 2016 3rd Runner-Up Nichole Marie Manalo, and the niece of Miss International 1968 Top 15 Semi-finalist Nini Ramos.

Prior to joining the Binibining Pilipinas pageant, Manalo worked as a flight attendant for the domestic operations of Philippine Airlines. She graduated from Assumption College San Lorenzo with a degree in (Advertising). In 2018, she began dating Senator Win Gatchalian. In January 2026, Gatchalian stated in an interview that his love life was "non-existent", confirming the end of their eight-year relationship. Amidst rumors linking Manalo to British entrepreneur Jonathan Sterling and his recent split with Celeste Cortesi, the titleholder of Miss Universe Philippines 2022, Manalo released a statement from her agency denying the rumors, asserting that Manalo was still single and not in any relationship.

== Filmography ==
=== Film ===
Year	Title	Role	Source
2011	The Adventures of Pureza: Queen of the Riles	Daniella Fabella dela Bamba	
2013	Kung Fu Divas	Charlotte's adoptive sister	
2014	Beauty in a Bottle	Queenie	
2014	Past Tense	Martina	
2019	3pol Trobol: Huli Ka Balbon!	Luningning Calvo	

=== Television ===
Year	Title	Role	Notes	Source
2010	Your Song	Sophia	Presents: "Beautiful Girl"	
2010	Maalaala Mo Kaya	Mildred	Episode: "Cross-Stitch"	
2010	Magkaribal	Gigi Fernando		
2010	ASAP	Herself (Performer / Host)		
2010–2011	Pablo S. Gomez's Juanita Banana	Juanita Villa		
2011–2012	Happy Yipee Yehey!	Herself (Co-host)		
2011	Gandang Gabi, Vice!	Herself (Guest)		
2011	Wansapanataym	Adolescent Cacai	Episode: "Cacai Kikay"	
2012	Wansapanataym	Mimi Sandoval	Episode: "Mini Mimi"	
2012	Maalaala Mo Kaya	Yvonne	Episode: "Gayuma"	
2012–2013	Aryana	Carlina Suarez		
2013	Kahit Konting Pagtingin	Mabel Romero		
2013–2014	Positive	Anne		
2015	Kapamilya, Deal or No Deal	Briefcase #9		
2015–2016	On the Wings of Love	Tiffany Olivar-Carpio		
2016	My Super D	Nicole Ramirez		
2016	Celebrity Playtime	Player		
2016	Ipaglaban Mo!	Anita	Episode: "Sanggol"	
2017	Wansapanataym	Reptilia / Katrina Maderazo	Episode: "Amazing Ving"	
2017	Ipaglaban Mo!	Rochelle	Episode: "Lihim"	
2017–2021	FPJ's Ang Probinsyano	Lourdes "Bubbles" Torres-Girona		
2019	Parasite Island	Melba Dimaano		
2022	Suntok sa Buwan	Joy		
2022	The Broken Marriage Vow	Carol Manansala		
2023	Wish Ko Lang	Betty	Episode: "Binalot na Handa"	
2023	Magandang Dilag	Riley Tevez-Illusorio		
2023	Black Rider	Hanna		
2024	Tadhana	Minerva	Episode: "Teen Mama"	
2024	Widows' War	Beverly Maison		
2024	Magpakailanman	Rochelle	Episode: "Babalikan o Papalitan"	
2024	Pepito Manaloto: Tuloy Ang Kwento	Elizabeth	Episode: "Boss Janice"	
2025–2026	Encantadia Chronicles: Sang'gre	Olgana		

== Awards and nominations ==
Year	Award-giving body	Category	Nominated work	Results
2011	25th PMPC Star Awards for TV	Best New Female TV Personality	Juanita Banana	Nominated

Awards and achievements
Preceded by Jennifer Barrientos (San Mateo, Rizal)	Binibining Pilipinas; Universe; 2009	Succeeded by Venus Raj (Bato, Camarines Sur)
Preceded by Rica Peralejo	Showtime Hurado; March 13–27, 2010	Succeeded by Phoemela Barranda
