= Sandra Seifert =

Filipino-German fashion model

Sandra Seifert-Dulc
- Born: Sandra Inez Suravilla Seifert (Note: Sandra Seifert was born in Taiwan. Thus, she does not possess her mother's maiden name which is Suravilla.); 1 February 1984 (age 42); Taipei, Taiwan
- Education: City University of New York, (Nursing Degree)
- Height: 1.75 m (5 ft 9 in)
- Beauty pageant titleholder
- Years active: 2009–present
- Hair color: Brown
- Eye color: Brown
- Major competitions: Elite Model Look Philippines (Winner); Miss Philippines Earth 2009 (Winner); Miss Earth 2009 (Miss Earth – Air)

Sandra Inez Seifert-Dulc (born 1 February 1984) is a Filipino-German fashion model, nurse and beauty pageant titleholder. She is a New York-educated nurse from Bacolod, Negros Occidental and was crowned Miss Philippines Earth 2009 in San Juan City, Philippines. She represented her country in the Miss Earth 2009, the 9th edition of Miss Earth international pageant, where she was crowned Miss Earth Air (1st Runner-up) on 22 November 2009.

== Biography ==
Seifert (also known by the nickname "Schazee") was born on 1 February 1984 in Taipei, Taiwan, to Zenaida Suravilla and Harald Seifert.

Seifert attended elementary school at Montessori and St. Scholastica's Academy in Bacolod City, and returned to Manila to complete middle school at the German Branch of the European International School, Manila (on the Eurocampus Manila), where she graduated Valedictorian, the highest rank among the graduating class. After attending Eurocampus, she continued her high school education at Brent International School in Biñan, Laguna. Seifert moved to New York where she excelled as a "straight A" student at the City University of New York and obtained her Nursing Degree. She participated in several extra-curricular activities; Seifert was elected President of the International Honor Society Phi Theta Kappa for the New York Chapter. She also extended her assistance as a tutor for other Nursing students, and as a Note-Taker for Students with Disabilities. She represented her college during the Salzburg Seminar in Austria, and was nominated as an exemplary student by the President of her college, which eventually led to her appearance on the City University of New York print ad in 2008. That same year, Seifert passed the New York Nursing Board Examination (NCLEX).

Seifert plays basketball and volleyball. She is also into competitive swimming; she won the silver medal during the swimming competition of the South-East Asian Games held in Jakarta, Indonesia, representing her school.

Seifert is fluent in German, English, Filipino, and French. She also speaks a Filipino native language Hiligaynon (informally known as Ilonggo), an Austronesian language spoken in Western Visayas in the Philippines. In addition, she has basic knowledge of Spanish and Italian languages.

== Early career ==
Seifert was first discovered by a talent scout/make-up artist at the age of 14. After only a few castings, Seifert received a call to join her first fashion show for a French eyewear company.

In 1998 she joined the Philippines' Elite Model Search where she won the Viva Look of the Year title and represented the Philippines in the international Elite Model Look Search, which was held in Nice, France.

Seifert was part of the Colgate Mintirinse ad campaign "Minti Cool" along with Anne Curtis and Aubrey Vizcarra. When Colgate decided to have a remake of that ad campaign a few years later, Michael Seifert (Sandra Seifert's brother) appeared as the male lead role alongside the new cast.

She was a muse for two Philippine Basketball Association teams, a professional basketball league in the Philippines: Red Bull in 2002 and FedEx in 2003. An avid basketball player herself, she also played for her school's women's team.

Seifert has done several national and international advertising commercials and graced many of Manila's hottest fashion shows including Philippine Fashion Week, Speedo, Benetton, Lancôme, and Bulgari Jewelry. While seen in ample fashion shoots, Seifert has written articles for magazines, well- tackling social awareness issues. In addition, she has been visible in numerous print ads and appeared on magazine covers including MEGA, Speed, and A&F. However, it was through her hosting job in the late night show "Master Showman," that she gained much recognition and popularity all over the Philippines. Aside from Master Showman, she also hosted the now defunct television show Campus Video with co-host Derek Ramsey. Her hosting opportunities were soon followed by traveling in and out of the Philippines as she signed up with a Thailand-based modeling agency.

== Miss Philippines Earth 2009 ==
Seifert, a vegetarian, crowned Miss Philippines Earth 2009, the 9th edition of the "beauty for a cause" pageant. She bested 49 other contestants representing various Filipino communities in the beauty contest that promotes environmental awareness. The event was broadcast by ABS-CBN in the Philippines and by The Filipino Channel internationally. She was crowned by the outgoing titleholder, Miss Earth 2008 Karla Henry, on 10 May 2009 at The Arena Entertainment and Recreational Center of the People, San Juan City.

Seifert was also an early favorite in the Miss Philippines Earth 2009 pageant, collecting four special citations: Best in Cultural Costume, Miss RCBC E-Woman, Gandang Ricky Reyes and Best in Swimsuit. Seifert's white "Pearl of the Orient" gown, a modern interpretation of the terno (a long dress in the Philippines characterized by broad "butterfly" sleeves that rise slightly at the shoulders and extend about to the elbow) featuring a feathered mask and layered Spanish lace embellished in crystals, beads, and pearls was designed by Frederick Peralta. She won P250,000, plus other prizes, and represented the Philippines in the Miss Earth pageant later that year.

She also impressed the judges during the final question and answer portion of the pageant with her answer to the final question “With global environment changing, what would you like to change in yourself that will make you a better pro-environment person?" Seifert said: "When I joined Miss Earth I became aware of the things I can do as a Filipino and as a citizen of the world. I would like to share this awareness with more people, whether on a personal level or through the media. I want to make a difference in every little way I can."

Negros Occidental Governor Isidro Zayco said Negrenses welcomed her success in the pageant. On May 25, 2009, she paid a courtesy call on Governor Zayco at the Provincial Capitol and met with mayors and board members of Negros Occidental province.

== Religion ==
Sandra Seifert has joined the Seventh-day Adventist Church by being baptized.

== Notes ==
Preceded by (Tanzania) Miriam Odemba	Miss Earth Air; 2009	Succeeded by (Ecuador) Jennifer Pazmiño
Preceded by (Mexico) Abigail Elizalde	Best in Swimsuit; 2009	Succeeded by (Vietnam) Lưu Thị Diễm Hương
Preceded by Karla Henry	Miss Philippines Earth; 2009	Succeeded by Psyche Resus
