= Melody Gersbach =

Filipino-German model, beauty queen and Binibining Pilipinas International 2009

- Born: Melody Adelheid Manuel Gersbach; November 18, 1985; Daraga, Albay, Philippines
- Died: August 21, 2010 (aged 24); Bula, Camarines Sur, Philippines
- Height: 1.70 m (5 ft 7 in)
- Beauty pageant titleholder
- Title: Binibining Pilipinas International 2009
- Hair color: Black
- Eye color: Brown
- Major competitions: Binibining Pilipinas 2009; (Winner – Binibining Pilipinas International 2009); Miss International 2009; (Top 15)

Melody Adelheid Manuel Gersbach (November 18, 1985 – August 21, 2010) was a Filipino-German model and beauty pageant titleholder.

== Personal life ==
Born in Daraga, Albay, to a German father (Wolfgang Gersbach) and a Filipina mother (Marina Manuel) and raised in Angeles City, Gersbach was the second of three siblings. She was a management graduate of the University of Asia and the Pacific and had been managing a family German restaurant business in Bicol.

== Pageantry ==
Gersbach, then aged 23, was crowned Binibining Pilipinas International 2009 on March 7, 2009. She was the second Bicolana beauty to hold a Binibining Pilipinas International title, the other one being the fellow Albayanon Georgina Anne de la Paz Sandico in 1999. Gersbach represented the Philippines in the 49th Miss International 2009 pageant in November 2009 in Macau, China, where she placed among the Top 15 Semi-Finalists.

== Death and memorial ==
Gersbach died in a car accident around 11 a.m. on August 21, 2010, when the Toyota Innova she was traveling in collided head-on with a Raymond passenger bus in Barangay Pawili in Bula, Camarines Sur. Police said, "the bus was trying to avoid a tricycle when it collided with a Toyota Innova". Gersbach, her makeup artist Alden Orense, and her driver, Santos Ramos Jr., were all killed in the accident, and several bus passengers were injured. The only car passenger to survive was Ronald Lita, a friend of Gersbach's. Gersbach was supposed to attend Ms. Bicolandia Executive Committee meeting for Ms. Bicolandia 2010 at the Avenue Hotel in Naga City.

Her remains were brought to the Heritage Park in Taguig, Metro Manila, for a week. She was buried at the Holy Mary Memorial Park in Angeles, Pampanga, where she grew up, following a funeral mass.

Preceded by Patricia Fernandez (Pasig)	Binibining Pilipinas International; 2009	Succeeded by Krista Kleiner (Quezon City)
