= Ruxandra Popa =

Romanian model and beauty queen (born 1987)

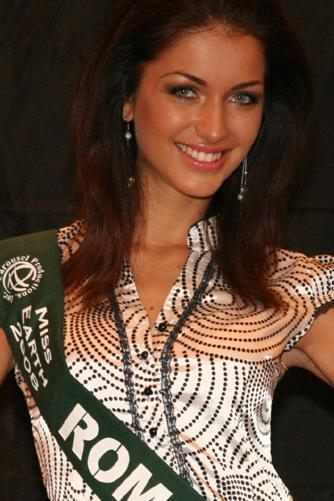
- Born: Ruxandra Popa; 1987 (age 38–39); Ploiești, Romania
- Height: 1.80 m (5 ft 11 in)
- Beauty pageant titleholder
- Title: Miss Earth Romania 2007
- Hair color: Black
- Eye color: Green
- Major competitions: Miss Earth 2008 (Top 16)

Ruxandra Popa (born 1987) is a Romanian model and beauty pageant titleholder. She was crowned Miss Romania-Earth 2008, and represented her country at Miss Earth 2008.

== Miss Earth 2008 ==
By winning Miss Romania-Earth, Popa earned the right to represent Romania at Miss Earth 2008.

In the final competition of the eighth edition of the international beauty pageant Miss Earth. She ended as one of the top 16 semi-finalists.

The Miss Earth pageant was held on November 9, 2008 at the Clark Expo Amphitheater in Angeles, Pampanga, Philippines.

Preceded by Alina Gheorge	Miss Romania-Earth; 2008	Succeeded by incumbent
