= Hana Svobodová =

Czech model (born 1988)

- Born: Hana Svobodová; July 30, 1988 (age 38); Prague, Czechoslovakia
- Height: 1.74 m (5 ft 8 1/2 in)
- Beauty pageant titleholder
- Title: Miss Earth Czech Republic 2008
- Hair color: Brown
- Eye color: Brown
- Major competitions: Czech Miss 2008 (Miss Earth Czech Republic 2008); Miss Earth 2008 (Top 16)

Hana Svobodová is a Czech model and beauty pageant titleholder who one of the three winners from the twelve (12) finalists of the nationwide search, Czech Miss, the Czech national beauty pageant which selects candidates for the international beauty competitions Miss Universe, Miss Earth, and Miss Intercontinental. The Ceska Miss 2008 edition was held on February 2, 2008. As the pageant runner-up, Svobodova represented Czech Republic in the global search for Miss Earth 2008 beauty pageant in November 2008.

She is a student at the Masaryk University in Brno. She is studying Government Administration.

== Miss Earth 2008 ==
In the final competition of the eighth edition of the international beauty pageant Miss Earth, Svobodová was announced as one of sixteen semi-finalists who moved forward to compete for the title. She ended as one of the top 16 semifinalists of Miss Earth. The Miss Earth pageant was held on November 9, 2008 at the Clark Expo Amphitheater in Angeles, Pampanga, Philippines. Eighty-five delegates arrived from October 19, 2008 in the Philippines. The pageant was broadcast live via ABS-CBN in the Philippines and to many countries worldwide via Star World, The Filipino Channel and other partner networks.
