= Tashi Choden =

Bhutanese-Tibetan beauty pageant titleholder

- Born: Tashi Chombal Choden; 29 March 1998 (age 28)
- Other name: Tashi Chombal Dorji
- Education: Utpal Academy
- Height: 1.73 m (5 ft 8 in)
- Beauty pageant titleholder
- Title: Miss Bhutan 2022
- Hair color: Black
- Eye color: Brown
- Major competitions: Miss Indo Bhutan Fest 2016 (Winner); Miss Citadel Pune 2017 (Runner-up); Miss Asia 2018 (Unplaced); Miss Supermodel Worldwide 2019 (Top 15); Miss Bhutan 2022 (Winner); Miss Universe 2022 (Unplaced)

Tashi Choden Chombal (Dzongkha: བཀྲ་ཤིས་ཆོས་སྡེ།; also: Tashi Chombal Dorji; born 29 March 1998) is a Bhutanese model and beauty pageant titleholder. In 2022, she won the title of Miss Bhutan, representing her country at the Miss Universe pageant. She is one of the first openly homosexual people in her home country, Bhutan.

== Early life ==
Tashi Choden's mother, Kinley Wangmo, ran a business in Wangdue Phodrang, and her father, Chombal, was a businessman from the Kham region of Tibet . Her parents met in Thimphu, and immediately after their daughter was born, the family moved to the Indian state of Nagaland. Since her father was often absent due to constant business trips, she and her mother moved back to Wangdue Phodrang three years later. Her father died a year later when Tashi Choden was four years old. Her mother remarried. When Tashi Choden was 14 years old, her mother also died. She grew up in the care of her aunt and grandmother, stepfather Dorji and two younger stepsiblings. The variants of her official name, Tashi Choden, are reminiscent of her father and stepfather.

Tashi Choden attended elementary and middle schools in Wangdue Phodrang and neighboring Paro District (most recently Utpal Academy there). Contrary to social convention, she decided to postpone further education at a university in favor of other projects and her modeling career. She began this at the age of 15 through personal contacts. As a result, she took part in various national and eventually international competitions and also worked as an actress. To advance her career, she moved to the capital, Thimphu. On June 4, 2022, she was crowned Miss Bhutan there. This was only the third edition of the competition in Bhutan, previously held in 2008 and 2010.

According to her own statements, Tashi Choden first described herself as bisexual on social networks at the age of 15. At that time, homosexuality was still formally criminalized in Bhutan. The process of decriminalization only began in 2019 as part of a criminal law reform. An addition to the relevant paragraph exempted adult homosexuality from the criminal offense of unnatural sexual intercourse, and the change became effective on February 17, 2021. In June 2021 (Pride Month) Tashi Choden came out to her family and finally to the public. Choden and her partner were among the first Bhutanese to publicly express their homosexuality. She describes herself as a genderfluid lesbian. Her selection as Miss Bhutan the following year was considered a remarkable step in view of the generally religious and conservative society of the isolated state and was also recognized as such internationally. Choden describes herself as a genderfluid lesbian. Various media referred to Tashi Choden as the "first openly lesbian woman" or at least the "first openly gay celebrity" their country. However, in the years before the law was changed, a social process had already taken place in the country in the course of which individual individuals were able to come out as homosexual without being prosecuted. On June 9, 2022, Tashi Choden spoke at a special edition of the United Nations - sponsored Bhutan Dialogues forum at Paro College of Education on Reckoning with Gender and Sexual Diversity.
