= Tsokye Tsomo Karchung =

Bhutanese actress and Miss Bhutan 2008

- Born: Tsokye Tsomo Karchung; August 20, 1984 (age 42); Thimphu, Bhutan
- Occupations: Model, Actress
- Height: 1.73 m (5 ft 8 in)
- Beauty pageant titleholder
- Title: Miss Bhutan 2008
- Years active: 2008–present
- Hair color: Black
- Eye color: Brown
- Major competitions: Miss Bhutan 2008 (winner); Miss Earth 2008 (Unplaced)

Tsokye Tsomo Karchung (born August 20, 1984) is a Bhutanese actress and beauty pageant title holder who won Miss Bhutan 2008 and competed in Miss Earth 2008. She is also the first Bhutanese woman to be crowned as Miss Bhutan.

As an actress, she acted in many Bhutanese films including 'My Teacher, My World, Wai Lama Kencho and Meto Pema .

Tsokye made her debut with the movie, 'Sem Gawai Tasha' which was a big success. Movie critics praised her performance and was well received by the masses. For the movie, she won the Best debutant female award in 2012. This was followed by many successful movies such as Sharchogpa Zamin, Shhh... Galuya Malap, Miss Kota and Drukpa Kuenley.

Tsokye holds the record of winning National Fimfare Awards in the category of best actress for four consistent years. In 2016, she won the award for the movie Wai Lama Kencho, one of her own production. She is an active public figure and has become a role model for Bhutanese girls.

Tsokye's latest movie, Thrung Thrung Karmo was released in December 2016. The movie was a recipient (awarded to three top movies) of the prestigious Prime Minister's Award at the Bhutan Film Awards 2017. Tsokye was also nominated for the Best Actress Award category.

== Pageantry ==
=== Miss Bhutan 2008 ===
Karchung won Miss Bhutan 2008, beating nineteen other contestants. The win sent her to compete in Miss Earth 2008.

=== Miss Earth 2008 ===
Karchung became the first Bhutanese representative to the Miss Earth pageant in 2008. She joined the rest of the delegates from 84 countries in Manila. She first underwent the official photo shoot and attended a cocktail dinner. The delegates then flew out to Coron, Palawan, one of the tourism wonders of the Philippines for a three-day trip and returned to Laguna, a province down south of Manila, for more environmental activities.

The director of Miss Bhutan pageant, Karma Tshering, along with Bhutan’s popular singer/actor, Rinchen Namgay, and Tsokye Tsomo’s sister, Euthra Karchung, were present in traditional Bhutanese attires at the grand finale.

She finished unplaced.

== Filmography ==
- 2013 - Jarim Sarim Yeshey Tshogay
- 2014 - BAEYUL-The Hidden Paradise
- 2015 Wai Lama Kencho
- 2016 Thrung Thrung Karmo
- 2016 Singye dha Gawa
