= Patricia Fernandez (actress) =

Filipino model, actress and television presenter

Patricia Fernandez-Garcia
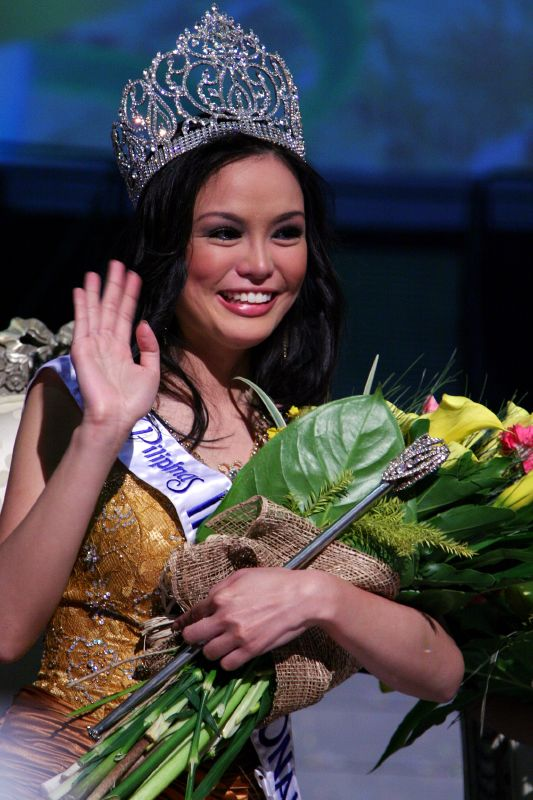
- Born: Patricia Isabel Medina Fernandez; November 5, 1985 (age 40); Pasig, Philippines
- Height: 5 ft 6 in (1.68 m)
- Spouse: Jan Aaron Garcia (m. 2014)
- Beauty pageant titleholder
- Title: Binibining Pilipinas International 2008
- Hair color: Black
- Eye color: Dark brown
- Major competitions: Mutya ng Pilipinas 2006 (1st Runner-Up); Binibining Pilipinas 2008 (Winner – Binibining Pilipinas International 2008); Miss International 2008 (Top 12)

Patricia Isabel "Pat" Medina Fernandez-Garcia (born November 5, 1985, in Pasig) is a Filipino actress, TV host, model, and beauty pageant titleholder. She was crowned Binibining Pilipinas International at the Araneta Coliseum on March 8, 2008 in Quezon City.

== Pageantry ==
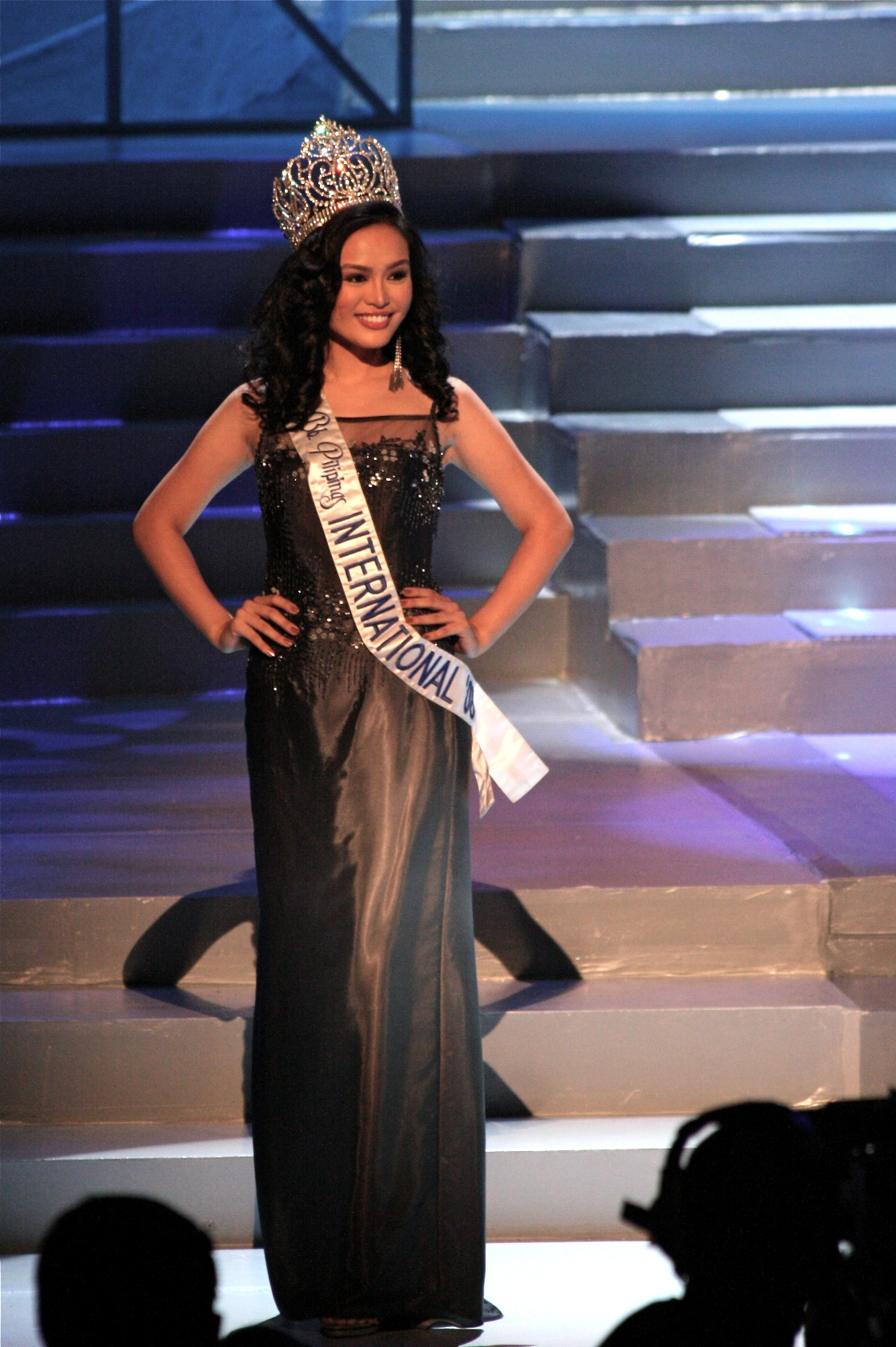
Fernandez' final walk at the 2009 Binibining Pilipinas.

=== Mutya ng Pilipinas ===
Having won Mutya ng Lungsod Quezon Turismo 2006, Fernandez represented Quezon City in Mutya ng Pilipinas, where she won First Runner-Up.

=== Binibining Pilipinas ===
The 2008 edition of the Binibining Pilipinas beauty pageant was held on March 8 in the Araneta Coliseum, Quezon City, Philippines. Fernandez captured the title, Binibining Pilipinas International, and earned the right to represent the Philippines in the Miss International Pageant later that year. She also received the Miss Natasha special award and appeared on the Natasha Catalog. The 2008 edition of the Philippines national beauty pageant encountered much controversy due to the question and answer portion of the Binibining Pilipinas World winner, Janina San Miguel. Fernandez was succeeded by Melody Gersbach, who won the Binibining Pilipinas International title on March 7, 2009.

=== Miss International ===
The 2008 Miss International Beauty Pageant was held in the Venetian Macao Hotel, Macau, China on November 8.

Fernandez's performance in the pageant landed her a spot in the Top 12 Semi-Finalists. The Filipino crowd gave her a round of applause at the gate of the Venetian Macao Hotel Theater, the only pageant candidate to receive such appreciation.

== Career ==
=== Host ===
Fernandez currently works as a video journalist for OMNI News: Filipino under OMNI Television in Canada.

Fernandez was part of Solar News Channel (later 9TV)'s headliner morning news program, Solar Daybreak, for which she did weather updates and feature stories in her own segment, "People, Attractions, and Travel, PAT Features." PAT Features also aired on Solar News Channel's Solar Newsday and Solar News Cebuano. Fernandez was CNN Philippines' entertainment correspondent during the transition between 9TV and CNN Philippines.

Fernandez was in Sapul sa Singko and its updated version Good Morning Club's Showbiz News segment host, and frequently appeared on the show's popular Love Hurts segment. Sapul and GMC are TV5's morning news and talk show. She was also a weather anchor for TV5's news channel, AksyonTV (now 5 Plus). Fernandez was also a host for the international network The Filipino Channel on the educational series Filipino Ka Sabihin Mo for its second and third seasons. The show aimed to teach Filipino expatriates the Filipino language through daily tasks and activities.

=== Filmography ===
Fernandez was part of TV5's youth-oriented romantic mini-series Luv Crazy, and played the role of Monica.

Preceded by Nadia Shami	Binibining Pilipinas International; 2008	Succeeded by Melody Gersbach
