= Janina San Miguel =

Binibining Pilipinas World 2008 titleholder

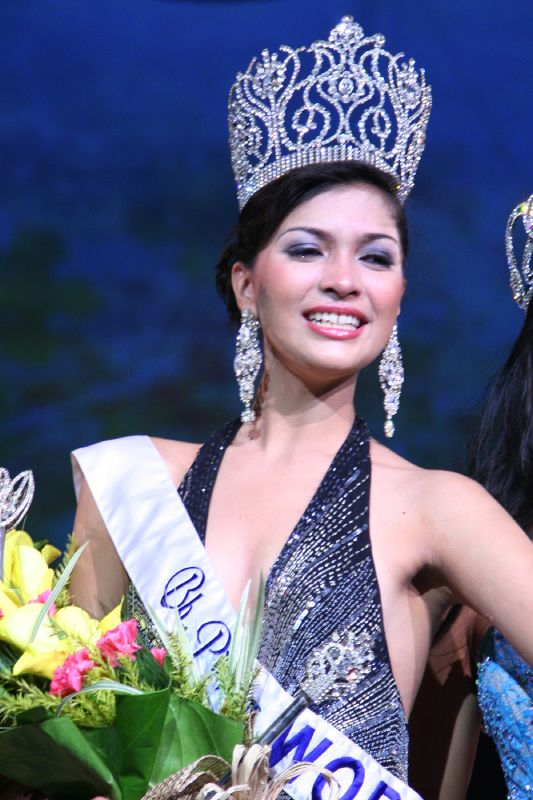
- Janina San Miguel at Binibining Pilipinas 2008
- Born: Janina Miller San Miguel; November 14, 1990 (age 35); Metro Manila, Philippines
- Height: 5 ft 11 in (1.80 m)
- Beauty pageant titleholder
- Title: Binibining Pilipinas World 2008
- Major competitions: Binibining Pilipinas 2008; (Resigned – Binibining Pilipinas World 2008); Miss World 2008; (Did not compete)

Janina Miller San Miguel (born November 14, 1990) is a Filipino beauty queen who was crowned Binibining Pilipinas World at the Binibining Pilipinas 2008 beauty pageant.

San Miguel resigned from her title in September 2008, three months before the scheduled Miss World pageant, citing personal reasons including the death of her grandfather. The title was transferred to the first runner-up, Danielle Castaño, who went on to represent the country at the Miss World 2008 pageant. Since then, San Miguel has lived a life out of the spotlight.

== Background ==
Janina San Miguel came from a poor family living in a residential compound in Quezon City. She is the eldest of three children, with her father working as a jeepney driver and her mother as a laundry washer or "labandera" (hired to wash other people's clothes).

At the time of the Binibining Pilipinas 2008 pageant, San Miguel was a freshman student taking up broadcast communication at the University of the East in Manila, with the ambition of becoming a professional broadcaster.

== Pageantry ==
=== Binibining Pilipinas ===
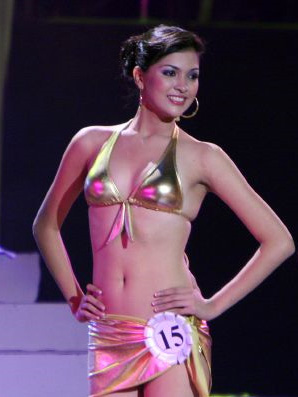
San Miguel in Binibining Pilipinas 2008 swimsuit competition

The 2008 Binibining Pilipinas pageant was held on March 8, 2008, at the Araneta Coliseum in Quezon City, Metro Manila. At seventeen years old, Janina San Miguel was the youngest contestant of the twenty-four women in the competition, as well as one of the tallest at 5 ft 11 in (180 cm). Early in the competition, San Miguel had won special awards for Best in Swimsuit and Best in Long Gown.

==== Question and answer ====
As part of the question and answer portion of the pageant, candidates were made to randomly select the name of their questioner-judge out of a fishbowl. The name that San Miguel picked was that of Vivienne Tan, the daughter of billionaire Lucio Tan. She asked San Miguel: "What role did your family play for you as candidate to Binibining Pilipinas?" San Miguel's response was disorganised and stumbling. As she lost her composure in giving her answer, the audience reacted with jeers and applause, as well as laughter from the panel of judges and other contestants. Despite the problems with her answer, she went on to win the competition and was crowned Binibining Pilipinas World. The criteria for judging the winner of the pageant allotted 80 percent to physical beauty, leaving just 20 percent to be divided evenly between personality and intelligence. Bediones later defended San Miguel, saying "I admire her for not buckling under the pressure and for being as blatantly honest as possible". However, he also added, "No matter how badly she may have performed in the Q&A, she couldn't have lost much considering she had a huge headstart in the scores". Winning the title made her the official designated Philippine delegate to the Miss World 2008 pageant, which was scheduled to be held later that year in Kyiv, Ukraine, (the venue was later moved to Johannesburg, South Africa, due to the conflict between Georgia and Russia).

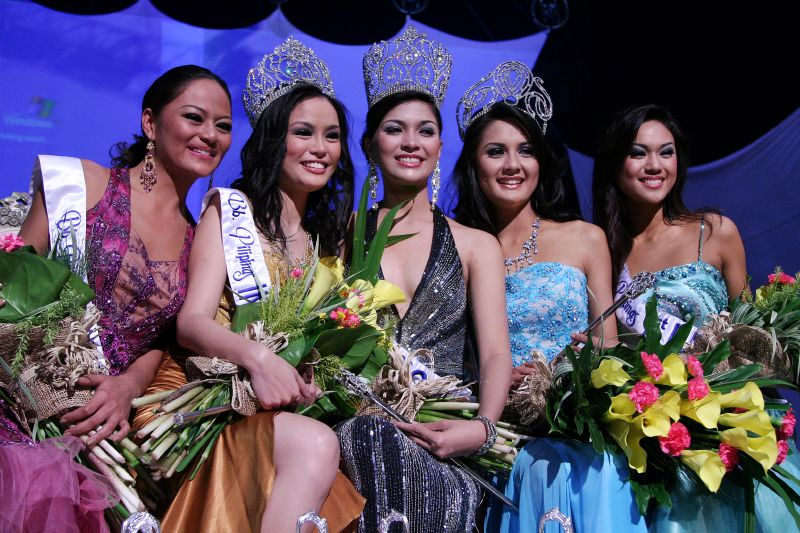
Janina San Miguel (center) was crowned Binibining Pilipinas World.

San Miguel has admitted to being offended by criticism of her Q&A segment response. In an interview with entertainment commentator Ricky Lo a week after the event, she explained that she did not comprehend the question clearly when she was on stage at the pageant, due to the softness of the questioner's voice. When given another opportunity to answer the same question, she smiled and said, "My family is my inspiration".

==== Reaction ====
Video clips of her response have been uploaded to YouTube, which instantly boosted her popularity. Representative Eduardo Gullas, a senior lawmaker in the Philippine House of Representatives who authored a bill to reinstate English as the medium of instruction in schools, said the video of the incident was "tormenting to watch", and added, "She is a Filipino, and English is our highly favored second language. So people expected more from her." Following the incident, the director of the Technical Education and Skills Development Authority offered to coordinate with pageant organizers to conduct English courses for all Miss Philippines candidates to better express themselves.

San Miguel's response has drawn comparisons between her and Melanie Marquez, Filipina winner of the 1979 Miss International pageant who is well-known for her shortcomings in speaking English.

==== Resignation ====
It was announced on September 30, 2008, that Janina San Miguel had resigned her position of Binibining Pilipinas World. A short official statement released by Binibining Pilipinas Charities said "The untimely demise of her grandfather, among other personal reasons, has caused her undue stress, thus hindering her from fulfilling her duties for the said title". Her resignation came six months after winning the title, and just three months before the scheduled Miss World pageant.

The announcement of her resignation was met with speculation that San Miguel had been forced by Binibining Pilipinas pageant organizers to relinquish her title due to a lack of professionalism during preparatory training sessions, which strained the patience of her mentors and superiors. In a later interview, she admitted that due to multiple conflicts in schedule she was unable to attend all the training sessions arranged for her by pageant organizers, which included sessions to improve her speaking ability. She also admitted to throwing a fit in the middle of a rehearsal when she received news that her grandfather was dying, and demanded that she be allowed to leave. However, according to an interview in a Singapore-based documentary series, San Miguel bared that the indecent sexual propositions, social isolation, and the contest organizers’ rigid standards were the reasons she gave up her Binibining Pilipinas crown and her chance to represent the Philippines in the Miss World contest in 2008.

In accordance with pageant rules, San Miguel's title was automatically transferred to the first runner up, Danielle Castaño. Castaño represented the Philippines at the Miss World 2008 pageant held in Johannesburg, South Africa, in December 2008, where she placed as a finalist in the Miss World Beach Beauty event and a semi-finalist in the Miss World Top Model event. She finished in the Top 32 overall.

=== Face of Tourism ===
In 2023, San Miguel made a comeback to pageantry when he joined the Mrs. Face of Tourism Philippines 2023 pageant, a pageant for married women who would promote the country's tourism industry. During the screening process, she was asked about civil status and its relevance, to which she replied by quoting Miss Universe 2022 R'Bonney Gabriel, saying that it is not about one's age or status but about treating everyone equally. She was then asked what characteristic best described her as a pageant candidate, to which she cited her "courage, perseverance, and patience". Netizens noticed that she had improved her communication skills and reacted positively. However, she backed out of the competition due to an argument with the pageant director.

== Entertainment career ==
San Miguel was strongly considered for a role as a contestant in the second season of the reality television series Survivor Philippines, which began filming in May 2009. Though one of the show's criteria is that the contestants must not be celebrities, San Miguel was not regarded to be a celebrity by the show's producers. Show host Paolo Bediones (who also hosted the Binibining Pilipinas pageant) explained in an interview that she was a shoo-in for the part, but decided to back out at the last minute.

In March 2009, San Miguel was a guest star on the TV series Lipgloss. Later that year, she became a contestant in the third season of Celebrity Duets: Philippine Edition. In the season's first three episodes, she performed duets with Maureen Larrazabal, Bituin Escalante, and Paolo Ballesteros. However, she garnered the lowest number of text votes in the first round of eliminations, and became the first contestant voted off of the show on September 12, 2009.

San Miguel has stated that she is refraining from focusing full time on her entertainment career due to her ongoing studies, though she continues to work on her figure in preparation for modeling opportunities. On October 23, 2009, she was one of the ten finalists in the Philippine qualifying round of the Ford Models Supermodel of the World modeling contest, which was held at the SMX Convention Center in Pasay. She advanced to the top three, but the contest was won by Charlene Almarvez, who went on to win first-runner up to Karlina Caune of the Baltics in the Supermodel of the World finals held in São Paulo, Brazil.

In 2023, San Miguel, along with Binibining Pilipinas International 2008 Patricia Fernandez and some of her friends, appeared as contestants on Family Feud, playing for Autism Society Philippines.

== Personal life ==
San Miguel is currently married to Vishal Sahota, an Indian national. For a time, she worked as a call center agent. She is set to become a pastor.

Preceded by Margaret Wilson	Binibining Pilipinas World; 2008	Succeeded by Danielle Castaño
