= Zadní Zhořec =

- Municipality
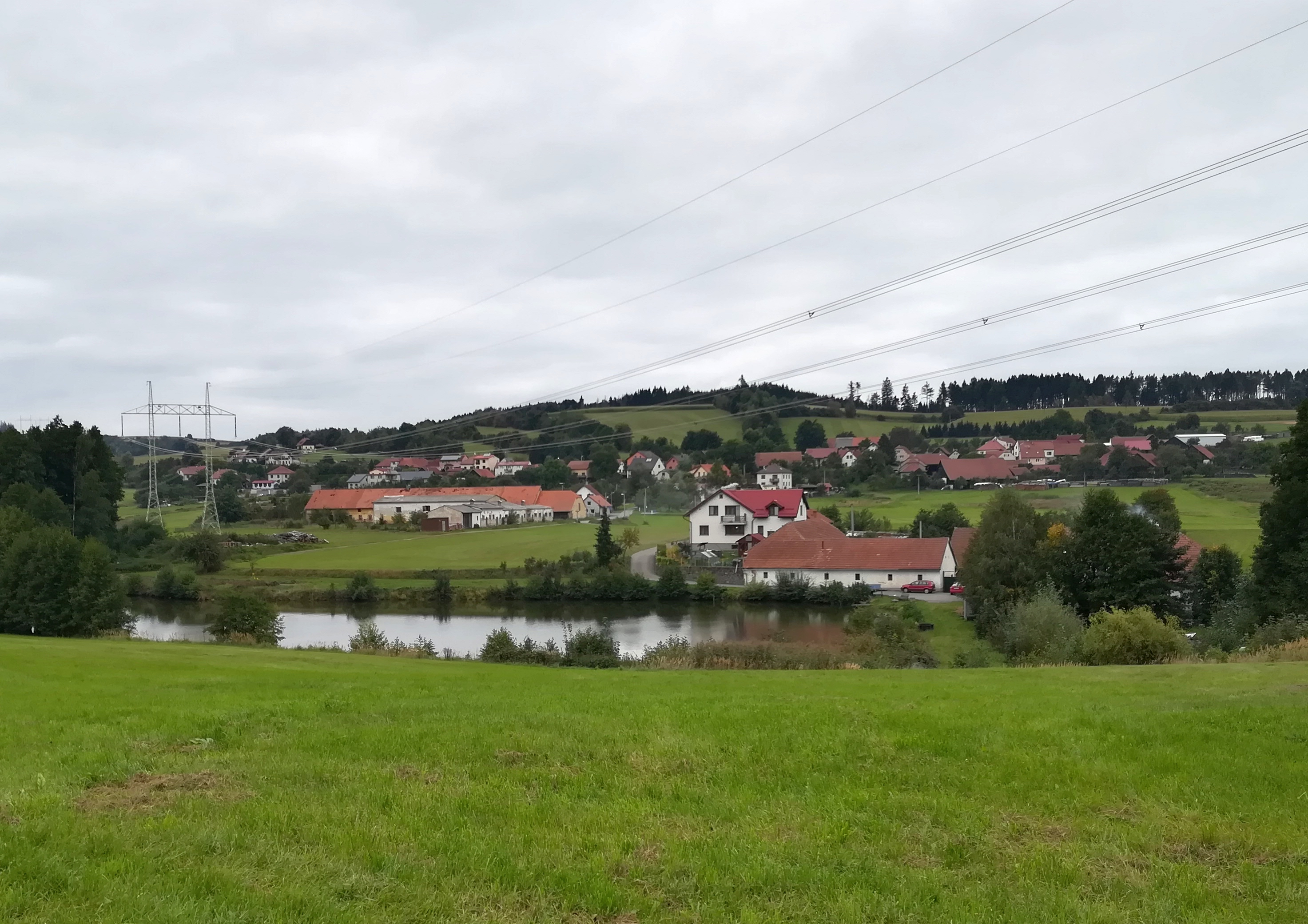
- View from the south

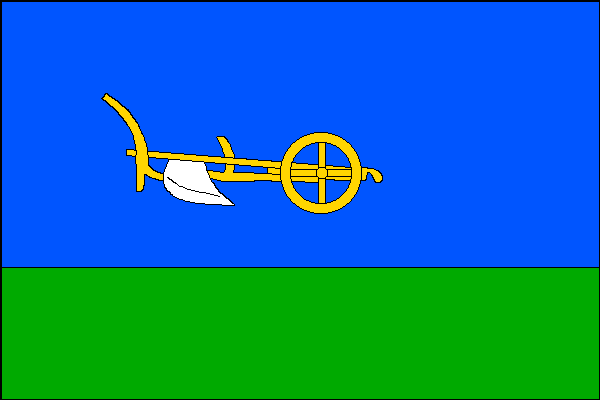
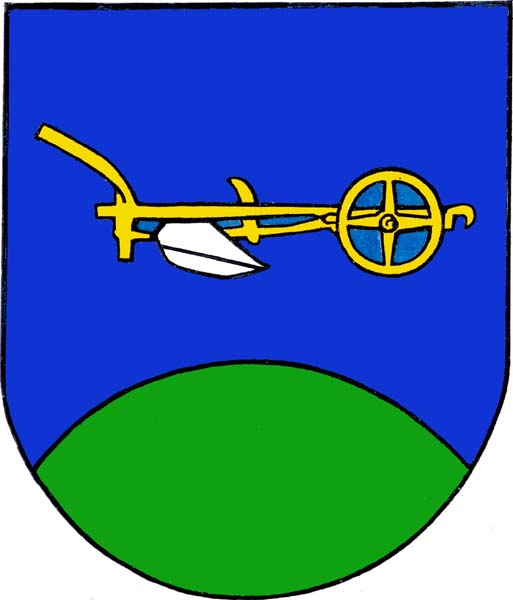
- Flag Coat of arms

- Location in the Czech Republic
- Coordinates: 49°25′52″N 15°56′21″E
- Country: Czech Republic
- Region: Vysočina
- District: Žďár nad Sázavou
- First mentioned: 1446

Area
  - Total: 4.14 km^{2} (1.60 sq mi)
- Elevation: 556 m (1,824 ft)

Population (2026-01-01)
  - Total: 137
  - Density: 33.1/km^{2} (85.7/sq mi)
- Time zone: UTC+1 (CET)
  - Summer (DST): UTC+2 (CEST)
- Postal code: 594 44
- Website: www.zadnizhorec.cz

Zadní Zhořec is a municipality and village in Žďár nad Sázavou District in the Vysočina Region of the Czech Republic. It has about 100 inhabitants.

Zadní Zhořec lies approximately 16 kilometres (10 mi) south of Žďár nad Sázavou, 25 km (16 mi) east of Jihlava, and 131 km (81 mi) south-east of Prague.

== Demographics ==
Historical population
| Year | Pop. | ±% |
|---|---|---|
| 1869 | 207 | — |
| 1880 | 246 | +18.8% |
| 1890 | 232 | −5.7% |
| 1900 | 215 | −7.3% |
| 1910 | 209 | −2.8% |
| 1921 | 209 | +0.0% |
| 1930 | 190 | −9.1% |
| 1950 | 171 | −10.0% |
| 1961 | 156 | −8.8% |
| 1970 | 145 | −7.1% |
| 1980 | 146 | +0.7% |
| 1991 | 147 | +0.7% |
| 2001 | 132 | −10.2% |
| 2011 | 135 | +2.3% |
| 2021 | 134 | −0.7% |
Source: Censuses
