= Karla Henry =

Filipino-Canadian model and beauty queen (born 1986)

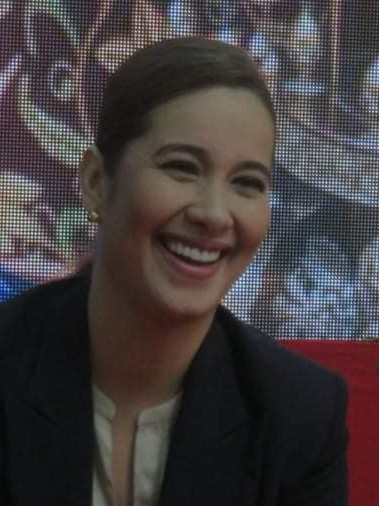
- Henry in 2022
- Born: Karla Paula Ginteroy Henry; May 23, 1986 (age 40); Limay, Bataan, Philippines
- Education: University of Cebu (Tourism)
- Height: 1.74 m (5 ft 8 1/2 in)
- Spouse: Rico Ammann (m. 2018)
- Beauty pageant titleholder
- Title: Miss Philippines Earth 2008; Miss Earth 2008
- Major competitions: Miss Cebu 2006 (2nd Runner-Up); Binibining Pilipinas 2008 (Unplaced); Miss Philippines Earth 2008 (Winner); Miss Earth 2008 (Winner)

Karla Paula Ginteroy Henry-Ammann (Tagalog pronunciation: [ˈhɛnɾɪ]; born May 23, 1986) is a Filipino-Canadian model and beauty queen. She was crowned Miss Earth 2008, becoming the first Philippine delegate and the first in the Asian region to win that title.

== Early life ==
Henry was raised by her grandparents until the age of four when her family moved to Tsawwassen, Canada, where they lived for ten years but frequently visited the Philippines for Christmas and summer vacations. Upon her family's return to the Philippines, they first lived in Albay, Bicol for a year then moved to Cebu.

Henry's father traveled often, and she transferred schools frequently. She graduated high school from Camp Lapulapu National High School and attended college at the University of Cebu. She holds a bachelor's degree in tourism and was working with Marco Polo Plaza Hotel when she was invited to join the Miss Earth pageant. She speaks fluent Spanish.

Henry's beauty pageant career began as a student representative of her school for Miss Intramurals and Miss Milo Olympics. She joined her first professional beauty contest at age 17 in October 2003. In 2006, she was the second runner-up in the Miss Cebu pageant.

Growing up with her father, she considered him as the biggest influence in her life. She moved from Canada to the Philippines, but before joining pageants, she had a 9-to-5 job as a hotelier in Cebu. She then moved to Manila to participate in beauty contests.

== Pageantry ==
=== Miss Philippines Earth ===
Henry was chosen Miss Philippines Earth 2008 on May 11, 2008, and was held at the Crowne Plaza Galleria in Ortigas, Mandaluyong, besting 40 contestants from all over the Philippines and Filipino communities abroad. On the pageant night, contestants were asked how they would explain the degradation of nature to simple folk. Henry gave the winning answer: "I will educate them by giving them an example; through my example I will give nature the best of me".

In a press conference, she narrated how the pageant influenced her: "When I joined Miss Philippines, there was a very funny story about the first day I saw the other girls, the contract-signing day with Carousel Productions, the pageant organizer. Miss Untalan (Miss Earth Foundation executive director) warned me, ‘If you’re here for the fame and glamour of being a beauty queen, then you’re in the wrong pageant. Here, we’re really serious about our advocacy. We really do get down and dirty with the activities that we do.’ I said, these guys are really serious. I should really join this. I pursued it and I have no regrets."

As Miss Philippines, she utilized her reign in promoting environmental awareness, working with Miss Earth Foundation through its project I Love My Planet Earth School Tour. Henry, along with her court has visited more than 20 schools and communities, teaching kids about the environment, through games, singing songs, storytelling, and even demonstrating how easy it is to plant trees.

Apart from the outreach projects, she travelled in June 2008 to Europe and participated in the opening of Expo Zaragoza 2008, an international exposition held from June 14 – September 14, 2008, coordinated by the Bureau of International Expositions held in Zaragoza, Spain, with the topic of Water and Sustainable Development that took place in the meander of the river Ebro and promoted the ecotourism of the Philippines.

On July 18, 2008, she served as one of the quizmasters of a history quizbee for high school students with disabilities as part of the activities of the 30th Philippine National Disability Prevention and Rehabilitation Week, a project under the office of the President of the Philippines, which aimed on promoting greater access of disabled individuals to mainstream social activities.

In early September 2008, Henry, Miss Singapore 2008 Ivy Leow Kian Peng, and Miss Earth 2007 Jessica Trisko travelled to Singapore and to Ho Chi Minh City in Vietnam. They visited the Miss Áo Dài Center and met with media correspondents at a press conference at the New World Hotel then visited the Cần Giờ Mangrove Forest, listed as a biosphere reserve by UNESCO and an important wildlife sanctuary in Vietnam; she took part in the environmental activities as green ambassador and keynote speaker. Along with the other Miss Earth beauties, they also presented mid-autumn gifts to orphans, and participated in the activities of the International Tourism Exhibition 2008, where they met and interacted with the Ministers of Cambodia, Laos, and Vietnam.

On September 20, 2008, Henry and Miss Earth 2007 Jessica Trisko headed thousands of volunteers in a full day of filth-picking, sorting, and depositing in the coastal cleanup in San Dionisio bay, Parañaque as an annual event in tandem with the International Coastal Cleanup Day, the world's largest volunteer event started by Ocean Conservancy, which aims to bring together people from all nations to gather and clean their shores once a year.

In August 2011, she survived an attack when she was stabbed in the back by a suspected drunk man, Jherome Quibuyen, with a broken beer bottle.

=== Miss Earth 2008 ===
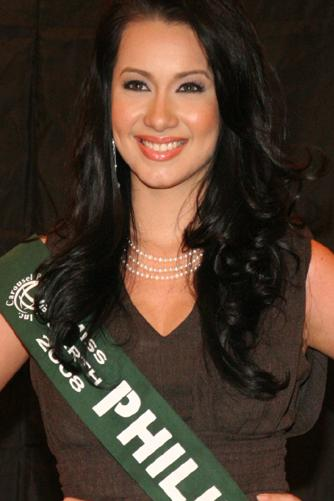
Karla Henry during Miss Earth press conference

Henry was announced as one of sixteen semi-finalists who would move forward to compete for the Miss Earth 2008 pageant that was held at Clark Expo in Angeles City, Pampanga, Philippines on November 9, 2008. She articulated in her video interview about going around public schools teaching about the environment as she cited that lack of knowledge about environmental concerns is a key issue in her country.

In the last round, the top four were asked one question, "What would you tell US president-elect Barack Obama about the state of the global environment if ever you were to meet him?" She answered, "Environmental knowledge is something that all of us must share, but most importantly we must teach the youth that this is something that we should instill in them so that in the near future they will be the ones to take care of our mother Earth." She placed the highest score in the interview round and at the conclusion of the competition, she was crowned Miss Earth 2008.

She became the first Filipino and Asian to win the Miss Earth title. Together with the runners-up, Henry went around public schools in the Philippines to teach elementary pupils in public schools about environmental awareness. She promoted the "Green Thumbs Up" project, which enumerates 10 simple acts that these kids can practice at home and participated in a coastal cleanup in Manila Bay.

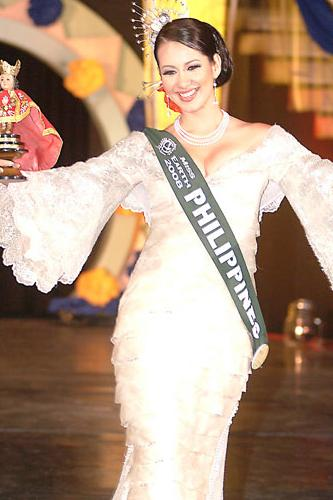
Karla Henry during the National Costume Event

On November 12, 2008, Henry led her court, Miss Earth Air Miriam Odemba of Tanzania, Miss Earth Water Abigail Elizalde of Mexico, and Miss Earth Fire Tatiane Alves of Brazil in the tree planting along with Philippine postal officials and employees for the "Nationwide Simultaneous Tree Planting" ceremony held at the Luneta Park, in connection with the 110th anniversary of the Philippine Postal Service to support the Department of Environment and Natural Resources and Non-governmental organizations for the Clean and Green Movements. The project was institutionalized, in the presence of Henry and her court, as an annual event in conjunction to the Zero Waste Management program.

On November 20, 2008, Henry, along with Miss Earth 2007 Jessica Trisko, graced one of the projects of the Philippine Department of Tourism called "Rediscovering the Best of Metropolitan Manila, People, Places, Products and Practices", a product and photo exhibit first presented in the Music Hall of the SM Mall of Asia in Pasay City on a three-day exhibit, which aimed to promote awareness among the youth on the Philippine National Capital Region's heritage. Aside from Henry and Trisko, the event was also participated by the 17 cities and municipalities that make up Metropolitan Manila. They also visited elementary schools to educate the children on recycling, waste segregation and other environmentally sustainable practices.

On December 4, 2008, Henry attended an environmental press conference and activities for a "Toxics-Free Christmas: Our Gift to the World" as part of the ongoing effort of Miss Earth Foundation, in partnership with the Eco Waste Coalition, to inform consumers about the risks and dangers of exposure to hazardous chemicals to public health and the environment, and empower the public to make sound decisions on what practices, products, and services to choose. Accompanying Henry at the press conference were Andrea León, Miss Ecuador 2008; Marie Razel Eguia, Miss Philippines-Air 2008; Marian Michelle Oblea, Miss Philippines-Water 2008; Kristelle Lazaro, Miss Philippines-Fire 2008; and Catherine Untalan, Executive Director, Miss Earth Foundation. Henry and Untalan sat in the panel and took turns in discussing ecological alternatives to some toxic practices. Henry also shared tips on "decorating green" with eco-friendly Christmas ornaments such as the traditional belen and parol from used or locally sourced biodegradable materials.

On January 18, 2009, Henry was the lead dancer in the grand finale of the Sinulog Festival, an annual festival held on the third Sunday of January in Cebu City. She was tapped to take the place of Cebu City First Lady Margot Osmeña in the grand finale of the festival.

On February 22, 2009, Henry and her court joined employees of Bacman Geothermal Production Field in tree planting activities in Sorsogon and participated in the launching of wildlife conservation program and inspected some environmental projects such as the butterfly garden, nursery of endemic trees, and mangrove plantation.

On March 17, 2009, Henry traveled to Miami, Florida to attend the first annual Green Fashion Show hosted by former Vice President of the United States Al Gore. Designers from Latin America, Europe, the United States, and Caribbean presented garments made exclusively from eco-friendly and recycled materials. The event was also attended by Gloria Estefan, Miss Earth United States 2008 Jana Murrell, and Miss Earth 2007 Jessica Trisko and was covered by CBS, NBC, Telemundo and Mega TV.

== Media and community involvement ==
Henry along with Cebu City Mayor Michael Rama, and representatives from the World Wide Fund (WWF) led the Earth Hour 2012 on March 31 in Cebu City as one of the official switch-off sites in the Philippines together with the cities of Makati and Davao. She led the Pledge for Mother Earth where 13 megawatts were saved by residents and establishments in Metro Cebu who switched off their lights and non-essential appliances.

In May 2018, Henry was one of the recipients of The Outstanding Men and Women of the Year Philippines for her environmental advocacies and received the award at the Teatrino Promenade in Greenhills, San Juan, Metro Manila.

=== Sinulog festival ===
In January 2012, Henry danced with the Cebu City government contingent in celebration of the Sinulog Festival to commemorate the Cebuano people's pagan origin, and their acceptance of Roman Catholicism.

=== Television ===
Year	Title	Role	Network
2010	It's Showtime	Judge (4 weeks)	ABS-CBN
2012	It's Showtime	Judge (1 week)	ABS-CBN
2013	Miss Philippines Earth 2013	Host	ABS-CBN
2014	Miss Philippines Earth 2014	Host	ABS-CBN
2015	SM City Cabanatuan: Tenant Preview	Host	SM Supermalls
2019	Miss Earth Philippines 2019	Host	ABS-CBN

=== Government ===
Henry was named spokesperson for Cebu City mayor Mike Rama in March 2022.

== Personal life ==
Henry married Rico Ammann, a businessman, in 2018.

Awards and achievements
Preceded by (Canada) Jessica Trisko	Miss Earth; 2008	Succeeded by (Brazil) Larissa Ramos
Preceded by Jeanne Harn (Rizal)	Miss Philippines Earth; 2008	Succeeded by Sandra Seifert (Negros Occidental)
