= Miss Earth 2008 =

8th Miss Earth pageant

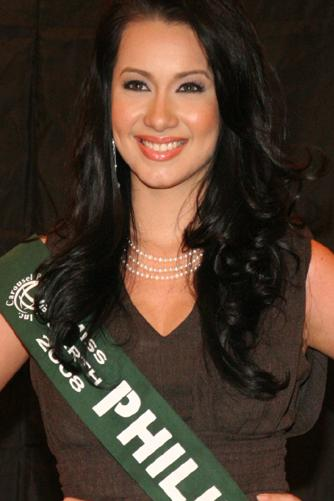
- Karla Henry
- Date: November 9, 2008
- Presenters: Billy Crawford; Priscilla Meirelles; Riza Santos
- Venue: Clark Expo Amphitheater, Angeles City, Philippines
- Broadcaster: ABS-CBN; Studio 23; The Filipino Channel
- Entrants: 85
- Placements: 16
- Debuts: Bhutan; Democratic Republic of the Congo; Guam; Luxembourg; Malta; Rwanda; Scotland; Serbia; South Sudan
- Withdrawals: Belize; Cameroon; Denmark; Fiji; Guatemala; Hong Kong; Iceland; Kazakhstan; Kenya; Nepal; Niue; Norway; Paraguay; Saint Lucia; Sierra Leone; Tibet; Trinidad and Tobago; Ukraine; United States Virgin Islands; Vietnam; Zambia; Zimbabwe
- Returns: Greece; Honduras; Hungary; Jamaica; Kosovo; Pakistan; Panama; Russia; Tahiti; Turkey
- Winner: Karla Henry; Philippines
- Congeniality: Andrea Leon Janzso, Ecuador
- Best National Costume: Shassia Ubillús, Panama
- Photogenic: Karla Henry, Philippines

Miss Earth 2008 was the eighth edition of the Miss Earth pageant, held at the Clark Expo Amphitheater in Angeles City, Philippines, on November 9, 2008.

Jessica Trisko of Canada crowned Karla Henry of the Philippines as her successor the end of the event.

== Results ==
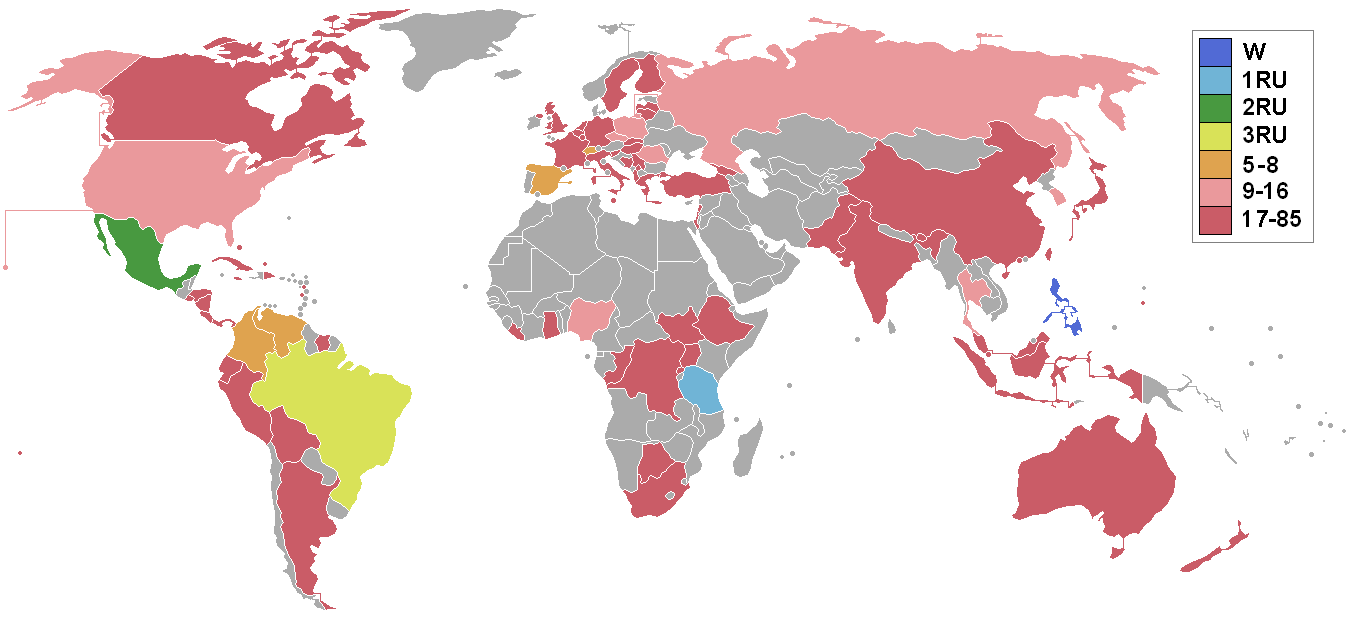
Countries and territories that sent delegates and results

=== Placements ===
Placement	Contestant
Miss Earth 2008	Philippines – Karla Henry
Miss Earth – Air 2008	Tanzania – Miriam Odemba
Miss Earth – Water 2008	Mexico – Abigail Elizalde
Miss Earth – Fire 2008	Brazil – Tatiane Alves
Top 8	Colombia – Mariana Rodriguez; Spain – Adriana Reverón; Switzerland – Nasanin Nuri; Venezuela – Daniela Torrealba
Top 16	Czech Republic – Hana Svobodová; Nigeria – Ezinne Uko; Poland – Karolina Filipkowska; Romania – Ruxandra Popa; Russia – Anna Mezentseva; South Korea – Seol-hee Seo; Thailand – Piyaporn Deejing; United States – Jana Murrell

=== Special awards ===
==== Major awards ====
Awards	Contestant
Miss Friendship	Ecuador – Andrea Leon Janzso
Miss Photogenic	Philippines – Karla Henry
Miss Talent	Australia – Rachael Margot Smith
Best in National Costume	Panama – Shassia Ubillús
Best in Evening Gown	Venezuela – Daniela Torrealba
Best in Swimsuit	Mexico – Abigail Elizalde

== Winning answer ==
Final Question in Miss Earth 2008: "If you have the chance to speak to the newly-elected US President Barack Obama about the state of the global environment, what would you tell him?"

Answer of Miss Earth 2008: "What I would tell to the newly elected president of the USA, being one of the most powerful countries in the world, I would encourage him to implement environmental knowledge in the curriculum of all schools whether in the United States or in the Philippines. Environmental knowledge is something that all of us must share, but most importantly we must teach the youth that this is something that we should instill in them so that in the near future they will be the ones to take care of our mother Earth." – Karla Henry, represented Philippines.

== Pageant ==
=== Format ===
Starting this year, the format of the finale has changed. In previous years, after the swimsuit competition, there will have only eight delegates. They will compete in the first question and answer section with different questions, then participate in the evening gown competition. After that, the top four was announced and participated in the final question. But from this year, the top eights will only participate in the evening gown competition. After that, the judges will select the final four. They only participated in one part of the only question and answer session before announcing three runners-up and Miss Earth.

=== Judges ===
No.	Judge	Background
1	Lourdes Atienza	Philanthropist and Beauty queen
2	Stephan Elsner	Fashion designer (Chairperson of the board of directors, Bonprix Italia)
3	Tom Hansen	Environmentalist
4	Hong Jin	Regional Director, Korean Air
5	Philip Lo	Director
6	Lisa Macuja-Elizalde	Prima Ballerina (Founder of Ballet Manila)
7	Andrea Mastellone	General manager, Traders Hotel Manila
8	Rizalino Navarro	Chairperson of Clark Development Corporation
9	Samuel West Stewart	Environmentalist (President of Philippines Bio Sciences Company Inc.)
10	Leo Valdez	Singer/International musical theatre actor
11	Ping Valencia	Image consultant/former top fashion model

== Background music ==
- Opening: Yves Larock – Rise Up, Pussycat Dolls – When I Grow Up
- Swimsuit Competition: Enur feat. Natasha – Calabria
- Evening Gown Competition: Coldplay – Viva la Vida

== Preliminary events ==
=== Beauties for a Cause ===
The delegates of Miss Earth 2008 explored the different islands of the Philippines with the theme "Green Lifestyle" and promoted the use of recyclable materials as part of our collective lifestyle. In addition, they engaged on different environmental activities including the planting of trees in the provinces of Albay, Batangas, Pampanga, Pangasinan, Palawan, and Rizal. They also had school tours in Taytay, Rizal, and Metro Manila and taught the children the importance of protecting the environment.

=== Long gown ===
Miss Venezuela, Daniela Torrealba was named Best in Long Gown at the competition held at the PAGCOR, Grand Theatre in the city of Parañaque on 3 November 2008.

=== Swimsuit ===
On 25 October 2008, the delegates were divided into three groups which simultaneously competed in the swimsuit preliminary competition in three different locations:

1. Sabang Beach Resort in Puerto Princesa, Palawan
2. Golden Sunset Resort in Calatagan, Batangas
3. Manila

The 15 finalists in each group then competed in the Final Swimsuit Competition held on 2 November at the Fontana Leisure Park in the Clark Freeport Zone, Angeles, Pampanga. Abigail Elizalde of Mexico emerged as the winner of the Best in Swimsuit.

=== National costume ===
The National Costume competition of Miss Earth 2008 was held on 28 October 2008 at the PAGCOR Grand Theatre in the city of Parañaque. And again minor/sponsor awards were also given at that night.

All of 85 candidates participated in the competition, with Miss Panama winning the coveted Best in National Costume award. Miss Philippines, Karla Henry was unanimously chosen by the members of the press as Miss Photogenic. Minor/sponsor awards were also given at that night.

=== TV shows ===
The ladies had their TV guesting on the different shows of ABS-CBN and Studio 23, the official media partner of Carousel Production for Miss Earth 2008. They had gone to Wowowee, ASAP, Kapamilya, Deal or No Deal, and The Singing Bee.

=== Mall tours ===
The delegates also had their mall tours and fashion shows in all Robinsons Malls nationwide in order to promote its cause which is to promote the protection of our environment.

== Contestants ==
85 contestants competed for the title.

Country/Territory	Contestant	Age	Hometown
Albania	Rudina Suti	23	Gjirokastër
Argentina	Camila Solórzano	19	Tucumán
Australia	Rachael Margot Smith	23	Perth
Bahamas	Garnell Storr	25	Musha Cay
Belgium	Debby Gommeren	20	Antwerp
Bhutan	Tsokye Karchung	24	Thimphu
Bolivia	Carolina Urquiola	23	La Paz
Bosnia and Herzegovina	Alisa Zlatarević	20	Sarajevo
Botswana	Nametso Ngwako	19	Serowe
Brazil	Tatiane Alves	24	Conselheiro Lafaiete
Canada	Denise Garrido	21	Bradford
China	Zhou Yingkun	22	Shandong
Colombia	Mariana Rodríguez	20	Cali
Costa Rica	Wendy Cordero	20	Cartago
Cuba	Jessica Silva	18	Camagüey
Czech Republic	Hana Svobodová	19	Zadní Zhořec
Democratic Republic of the Congo	Olga Yumba	21	Kasai-Oriental
Dominican Republic	Diana González Flores	18	San Francisco de Macorís
Ecuador	Andrea Carolina León	20	Machala
El Salvador	Teresita Gómez	23	San Salvador
England	Caroline Duffy	21	York
Ethiopia	Kidan Tesfahun	24	Addis Ababa
Finland	Minna Nikkilä	21	Tampere
France	Charlotte Lagauzere	24	Bayonne
Georgia	Sopiko Svimonishvili	20	Rustavi
Germany	Dayana Schult	18	Schwerin
Ghana	Sara Adoley Addo	24	Accra
Greece	Ria Antoniou	19	Athens
Guadeloupe	Jennifer Desbouiges	22	Basse-Terre
Guam	Jennifer Neves	26	Hagatña
Honduras	Kenia Andrade	22	Atlántida
Hungary	Krisztina Polgár	21	Törökszentmiklós
India	Tanvi Vyas	22	Vadodara
Indonesia	Hedhy Kurniati	22	Jakarta
Israel	Lin Mor	18	Tel Aviv
Italy	Caterina Pasquale	24	Crotone
Jamaica	Simone Burke	21	St. Andrew
Japan	Akemi Fukumura	26	Tokyo
Kosovo	Yllka Berisha	20	Pristina
Latvia	Anita Baltruna	25	Jelgava
Lebanon	Pamela Saadé	25	Jounieh
Liberia	Marit Woods	21	Monrovia
Lithuania	Ingrida Kazlauskaite	24	Kaunas
Luxembourg	Nadia Neves Pereira	22	Luxembourg
Macau	Qian Wei-Na	22	Macau
Malaysia	Audrey Ng	23	Perak
Malta	Maria Galea	18	Valletta
Martinique	Frédérique Violene Grainville	18	Fort-de-France
Mexico	Abigail Elizalde	23	Torreón
Netherlands	Melanie de Laat	22	Utrecht
New Zealand	Rachel Crofts	20	Manawatu
Nicaragua	Thelma Rodríguez	19	Chinandega
Nigeria	Ezinne Uko	22	Lagos
Northern Ireland	Gemma Walker	23	Slievemore
Pakistan	Nosheen Idrees	22	Jhelum
Panama	Shassia Ubillús	25	Panama City
Peru	Giuliana Zevallos	20	Loreto
Philippines	Karla Henry	22	Cebu City
Poland	Karolina Filipkowska	20	Łódź
Republic of the Congo	Katissia Kouta	23	Brazzaville
Romania	Ruxandra Popa	21	Abrud
Russia	Anna Mezentseva	23	Moscow
Rwanda	Cynthia Akazuba	18	Kigali
Scotland	Courtney St. John	22	Glasgow
Serbia	Bojana Traljic	18	Subotica
Singapore	Ivy Leow Kian Peng	25	Singapore
Slovakia	Martina Tóthová	20	Piešťany
Slovenia	Sara Frančeškin	18	Ljubljana
South Africa	Matapa Maila	23	Limpopo
South Korea	Seol-hee Seo	19	Daegu
South Sudan	Nok Nora Duany	18	Juba
Spain	Adriana Reverón	23	Tenerife
Suriname	Priscilla Yhap	22	Paramaribo
Sweden	Fanny Blomé	18	Norrköping
Switzerland	Nasanin Nuri	21	Teheran
Tahiti	Vahinetua Flaccadori	19	Papeete
(Chinese Taipei) Taiwan	Tsai Yin-Yin	22	Taipei
Tanzania	Miriam Odemba	25	Arusha
Thailand	Piyaporn Deejing	19	Nakhon Ratchasima
Turkey	Demet Karadeniz	25	Ankara
Turks and Caicos Islands	Sessily Pratt	18	Providenciales
Uganda	Daisy Nabagereka	22	Kampala
United States	Jana Murrell	26	Omaha
Venezuela	Daniela Torrealba	19	San Cristóbal
Wales	Jamie Lee Williams	22	Powys

== Notes ==
=== Debuts ===
- Bhutan
- Democratic Republic of Congo
- Guam
- Luxembourg
- Malta
- Rwanda
- Scotland
- Serbia
- South Sudan

=== Returns ===
- Last competed in 2001:
  - Turkey
- Last competed in 2003:
  - Hungary
  - Kosovo
- Last competed in 2005:
  - Jamaica
- Last competed in 2006:
  - Greece
  - Honduras
  - Pakistan
  - Panama
  - Russia
  - Tahiti

=== Withdrawals ===
- Belize
- Cameroon
- Denmark
- Fiji
- Guatemala
- Hong Kong
- Iceland
- Kazakhstan
- Kenya
- Nepal
- Niue
- Norway
- Paraguay
- Sierra Leone
- Saint Lucia
- Tibet
- Trinidad and Tobago
- United States Virgin Islands
- Zambia
- Zimbabwe

=== Did not compete ===
- Ukraine – Olha Bilousova
- Vietnam – Miss Tourism Vietnam 2008 Phan Thị Ngọc Diễm was invited by the Elite to participate in the contest and on the official fanpage also posted pictures with her personal information. However, she later said she did not officially participate in the competition. Explaining this, Ms. Nguyễn Thị Thúy Nga - CEO of Elite Company said her profile could not be completed in time to submit to the Ministry of Culture, Sports and Tourism has not found a truly suitable representative. Later, Carousel Productions removed her image and Vietnam officially withdrew from the competition this year.

=== Other notes ===
- Harshita Saxena surrendered her Miss India Earth title, paving way for Tanvi Vyas, who became Pantaloons Femina Miss India Earth 2008.
- Debby Gommeren was a replacement of Barbara van den Bussche, the original winner for an unknown reason.
- Akemi Fukumura (Japan) replaced Mayu Kato, the original contestant for unknown reason.
