= Miss Philippines Earth 2008 =

Beauty pageant

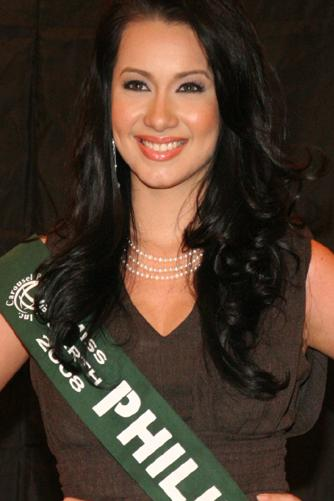
- Karla Henry
- Date: May 11, 2008
- Presenters: Rafael Rosell; Nikki Gil; Ginger Conejero
- Venue: Crowne Plaza Manila Galleria, Quezon City
- Broadcaster: ABS-CBN; The Filipino Channel
- Entrants: 41
- Placements: 10
- Winner: Karla Paula Henry; Cebu City

Miss Philippines Earth 2008 was the eighth edition of Miss Philippines Earth pageant. It was held last May 11, 2008 at the Crowne Plaza Manila Galleria in Ortigas Center, Quezon City, Philippines. The event was broadcast by ABS-CBN Network in the Philippines in the evening and The Filipino Channel internationally. The pageant was hosted by Rafael Rosell together with Nikki Gil and Ginger Conejero.

Forty-one delegates competed for the title, held by Jeanne Harn of the National Capital Region. At the conclusion of the final night of competition, Karla Paula Henry of Cebu was crowned Miss Philippines Earth in the eighth edition of the environmentally-conscious beauty pageant.

Marie Razel Eguia of Dipolog, won the Miss Air (2nd Runner-up) and competed in Miss Tourism Queen International 2009 in China. Marian Michelle Oblea of Obando became the Miss Water (3rd Runner-up). Maria Kristelle Lazaro of Candaba got the title of Miss Fire (4th Runner-up) and Venus Raj won the Miss Eco Tourism (5th Runner-up).

Aside from Miss Philippines Earth 2008 title, The first runner-up or Miss PAGCOR International Tourism Ambassadress which was won by Melanie Felix that night was awarded to her.

== Results ==
=== Placements ===
Placement	Contestant
Miss Philippines Earth 2008	Cebu City – Karla Paula Henry
Miss PAGCOR International Tourism Ambassador 2008	East Coast – Melanie Felix
Miss Philippines Air 2008	Dipolog – Marie Razel Eguia
Miss Philippines Water 2008	Obando – Marian Michelle Oblea
Miss Philippines Fire 2008	Candaba – Maria Kristelle Lazaro
Miss Philippines Eco Tourism 2008	Legazpi – Maria Venus Raj
Top 10	Bulakan – Joanna Rumohr; France – Alexandra Astrid Albert; West Coast – Nikki Martin; Zamboanga City – Sharina Deriza

== Contestants ==
There are forty-one official contestants for Miss Philippines Earth 2008.

Locality	Contestant	Age
Antipolo	Beatriz Celindro	18
Bacolod	Angelique Robles	20
Baguio	Joanna Cindy Miranda	18
Balayan, Batangas	Rina De Mesa	20
Batangas	Reena Calingasan	21
Bulacan	Joanna Rumohr	21
Caloocan	Vanessa Udarbe	-
Candaba, Pampanga	Maria Kristelle Lazaro	22
Cebu City	Karla Paula Henry	21
Dipolog	Marie Razel Eguia	20
East Coast of the United States	Melanie Felix	23
France	Alexandra Albert	19
Germany	Monika Elisa Konig	21
Ifugao	Iris Michelle Dulawan	24
Ilocos Sur	Diana Viray	20
Imus, Cavite	Katrina Cailipan	20
Indang, Cavite	Jaydielou Dilidili	20
Ipil, Zamboanga Sibugay	Alma Ruby Santos	20
Irosin, Sorsogon	Sherizza Galan	22
Kidapawan, Cotabato	Cheryll Mae Maata	22
La Union	Maria Kristina Tabas	21
Legazpi	Maria Venus Raj	20
Lipa	Joanne Mariel Sanchez	18
Malabon	Edfer Lyn Quintero	24
Mandaluyong	Mhyrtle Frances Bugarin	22
Marikina	Maria Angelica Liboon	20
Muntinlupa	Alexis Josef Abelardo	23
Naga, Camarines Sur	Henry Dee Lorica	20
Obando, Bulacan	Marian Michelle Oblea	21
Pagbilao, Quezon	Pamela Sue Nieva	23
Parañaque	Gina Albou Ghobesh	24
Passi, Iloilo	Winlove Dupit	19
Quezon City	Gizelle Jasmine Rivamonte	22
Rodriguez, Rizal	Yanica Lemoncito	20
Romblon	Mary Rose Sandig	18
South Cotabato	Rhea Niones	22
Surigao del Norte	Grachel Arlene Navarro	22
Tacloban	Maria Victoria Salazar	23
West Coast of the United States	Nikki Martin	21
Zamboanga	Sharina Deriza	19

== Judges ==
- H.E. Gerard Chesnel, Ambassador Extraordinary and Plenipotentiary to the Republic of the Philippines/ Embassy of France - Chairman of the Judges
  - Mr. Kim Atienza, Multi Awarded Broadcaster, ABS-CBN
  - Ricky Reyes, Entrepreneur and Salon Chain Owner
  - Anne Curtis, Actress and Commercial Model
  - Gen. Manuel Roxas, PAGCOR Director
  - Ms. Bridgitte Trattner, General Manager, Crowne Plaza Galleria
  - Mr. Eric Pineda, Costume and Fashion Designer at De La Salle College
  - Dr. Corazon PB. Claudio, President of Earth Institute Asia
  - Mr. Hong Jin, Regional Manager of Korean Air
  - Ms. Celine Clemente, President of Asian Gem

== Preliminary activities ==
Follow the candidates preliminary activities

Date	Event	Place
April 1, 2008	Long Gown Competition	PAGCOR, Parañaque
April 4 - May 2, 2008	Tigil Buga (Stop Emission) Rally	Robinsons Shopping Malls
April 21, 2008	Nestle Wellness	Nestle Cabuyao
April 25, 2008	Personality Development and Fashion For a Cause	Golden Sunset Resort
April 27, 2008	Briefing with Carousel Executives	Carousel Garden
April 29, 2008	Press Conference	Intercontinental Manila
April 29, 2008	Cultural Attire Competition	Crowne Plaza Galleria
May 1, 2008	Talent Competition	Lakeshore Resort, Pampanga
May 4, 2008	Lil' Earth Angel 2008 Finals	Enchanted Kingdom
May 5, 2008	Swimsuit Competition	Thunderbird Resort - Rizal
May 6, 2008	Pre - Judging Event	Intercontinental Manila
May 2008	Barangay Tours	Antipolo; Mandaluyong; Pandacan; San Andres; San Juan City

== 2008 Lil' Earth Angels ==
Miss Lil' Earth Angels 2008 is the second edition of Miss Lil' Earth Angels pageant. The 2008 Lil' Earth Angels concluded on May 11, 2008 at Crowne Plaza Galleria, Ortigas Center, Manila, Philippines together with the Miss Philippines Earth 2008 pageant.

Ten finalists were selected based on their preliminary activities that was held at Robinsons Malls in the Philippines. At the end of the night, Miss Lil' Earth Angel 2007 Denisse Mikaela Abuan crowned her successor.

=== Results ===
Final results	Contestant
Lil' Earth Angel	Joanna Mari Marcelo
Lil' Earth Angel-Air	Jazzmine Macdonal
Lil' Earth Angel-Water	Margaret Lipnitz
Lil' Earth Angel-Fire	Erica Rose Franco
Lil' Earth Angel-Eco Tourism	Princess Juvialle Zufianne Sabando
Finalists	Hanna Pauline Somosot; Quennie Vivien Garces; Tricia Cristobal; Jan Kayla Orozco; Joanne Elinor Berioso

=== Finalists ===
Finalists #	Contestants	Dates of being a finalist	Place
1	Joanna Marie Marcelo	April 4, 2008	Robinsons Place Manila
2	Margaret Lipnitz	April 5, 2008	Robinsons Place Imus
3	Hanna Pauline Somosot	April 9, 2008	Robinsons Galleria
4	Quennie Vivien Garces	April 11, 2008	Robinsons Place Dasmariñas
5	Tricia Cristobal	April 12, 2008	Robinsons Place Lipa
6	Jan Kayla Orozco	April 13, 2008	Robinsons Starmills Pampanga
7	Joanne Elinor Berioso	April 18, 2008	Robinsons Place Novaliches
8	Princess Juvialle Zufianne Sabando	April 19, 2008	Robinsons Place Sta. Rosa
9	Erica Rose Franco	April 20, 2008	Robinsons Place Angeles
10	Jazzmine Macdonal	May 2, 2008	Robinsons Metro East
