= List of The Amazing Race Asia contestants =

This is a list of contestants who have appeared on the television series, The Amazing Race Asia. Contestants with a pre-existing relationship form a team and race around the world against other teams to claim a grand prize of USD100,000. In total, 102 contestants comprising 51 teams of 2 have competed in the series.

== Contestants ==
The teams are arranged based on their placings and the team members are arranged based on the opening intro. Age appearing are during time of filming.

Name	Occupation	Age	Hometown	Season	Finish
Ernesto "Ernie" Lopez	Businessman	42	Manila, Philippines	Season 1	10th
Jill "Jeena" Lopez	Homemaker	35	Manila, Philippines	Season 1	10th
Jacqueline Yu	Model	23	Manila, Philippines	Season 1	9th
Aubrey Sandel	Actress	26	Manila, Philippines	Season 1	9th
Sahil Shroff	Model	26	Mumbai, India	Season 1	8th
Prashant Sachdev	Model	26	Mumbai, India	Season 1	8th
Melody Chen	Actress	28	Singapore	Season 1	7th
Sharon Wong	Headhunter	31	Singapore	Season 1	7th
Howard Bicknell	British tour operator area manager	39	Colombo, Sri Lanka^{1}	Season 1	6th
Sahran Abeysundara	Interior designer / events manager	31	Colombo, Sri Lanka	Season 1	6th
Andy Lawson	Entrepreneur	29	Koh Samui, Thailand^{1}	Season 1	5th
Laura Kluk	Entrepreneur	37	Koh Samui, Thailand^{1}	Season 1	5th
Marsio Juwono	Photographer	34	Jakarta, Indonesia	Season 1	4th
Mardy Juwono	Contractor	36	Jakarta, Indonesia	Season 1	4th
Andrew Tan	Managing director	26	Kuala Lumpur, Malaysia	Season 1	3rd
Park Syeon	Business development manager	28	Kuala Lumpur, Malaysia^{2}	Season 1	3rd
Sandy Sydney	Personal trainer	29	Hong Kong^{3}	Season 1	2nd
Francesca Etzdorf	Model	27	Hong Kong^{1}	Season 1	2nd
Zabrina Fernandez	TV producer	26	Kuala Lumpur, Malaysia	Season 1	1st
Joe Jer Tee	TV producer	29	Kuala Lumpur, Malaysia	Season 1	1st
Edwin Lo	Event organizer	26	Hong Kong	Season 2	10th
Monica Lo	Actress / model	28	Hong Kong	Season 2	10th
Kinaryosih	Model / actress	28	Jakarta, Indonesia	Season 2	9th
Brett Money	Physiotherapist	26	Jakarta, Indonesia^{8}	Season 2	9th
Sophie Teng	Writer	27	Hong Kong^{4}	Season 2	8th
Aurelia Chenat	Model	27	Hong Kong^{5}	Season 2	8th
Daichi Kawashima	Interpreter	26	Tokyo, Japan	Season 2	7th
Sawaka Kawashima	Singer / interpreter	28	Tokyo, Japan	Season 2	7th
Trinidad "Terri" Reed	Homemaker	44	Philippines	Season 2	6th
Henry Reed†	Retired US Navy Senior Chief Petty Officer	48	Philippines^{6}	Season 2	6th
Natasha Monks	Public relations / brand consultant	24	Thailand	Season 2	5th
Paula Taylor	Actress / VJ / model	24	Thailand	Season 2	5th
Diane Douglas	Marketing manager / teacher	33	Malaysia	Season 2	4th
Ann Tan	Business owner	40	Malaysia	Season 2	4th
Marc Nelson	TV host / model	31	Philippines	Season 2	3rd
Rovilson Fernandez	TV host / magazine editor	30	Philippines	Season 2	3rd
Pamela Chong	Dancer	24	Malaysia	Season 2	2nd
Vanessa Chong	Artiste manager	29	Malaysia	Season 2	2nd
Adrian Yap	Business development manager	27	Singapore	Season 2	1st
Collin Low	Regional sales director	35	Singapore	Season 2	1st
Neena Rai	Model / artist	24	Delhi, India	Season 3	10th
Amit Rai	Real estate consultant	27	Delhi, India	Season 3	10th
Isaac Hong	Sports agent	29	Seoul, South Korea	Season 3	9th
William Hong	Sports TV host & agent	26	Seoul, South Korea	Season 3	9th
Pailin Rungratanasunthorn	Model	25	Thailand	Season 3	8th
Natalie Glebova	Model	26	Thailand^{7}	Season 3	8th
Niroo Asrani	Actor	53	Mumbai, India	Season 3	7th
Kapil Asrani	HR executive	25	Mumbai, India	Season 3	7th
Visa "Mai" Sarasas	Actress / model	24	Thailand	Season 3	6th
Oliver Faivre	Model	25	Thailand	Season 3	6th
Henry Chan	Chef	43	Kuala Lumpur, Malaysia^{8}	Season 3	5th
Bernadette "Bernie" Chan	TV host / actress	39	Kuala Lumpur, Malaysia^{8}	Season 3	5th
Adeline "A.D." Chan	Freelance writer / director	34	Singapore	Season 3	4th
Faeza "Fuzzie" Sirajudin	Teacher	34	Singapore	Season 3	4th
Ida Nerina	Actress / director / producer	44	Kuala Lumpur, Malaysia^{1}	Season 3	3rd
Tania Khan†	Property developer	36	Kuala Lumpur, Malaysia	Season 3	3rd
Geoffrey "Geoff" Rodriguez	Model	26	Philippines^{3}	Season 3	2nd
Tisha Silang	Business development manager	32	Philippines^{7}	Season 3	2nd
Vincent "Vince" Chung	Comedian / host	32	Hong Kong^{7}	Season 3	1st
Samuel "Sam" Wu	University lecturer	32	Hong Kong^{4}	Season 3	1st
Nadine Zamira	Model	26	Indonesia	Season 4	10th
Hilyani "Yani" Hidranto	TV host	28	Indonesia	Season 4	10th
Alan Luk	Actor	32	Hong Kong^{7}	Season 4	9th
Wendy Lee	Actress	24	Hong Kong^{6}	Season 4	9th
Sahil Banga	Actor	25	India	Season 4	8th
Manas Katyal	Actor	23	India	Season 4	8th
Ivan Evetovics	University lecturer	33	Malaysia^{9}	Season 4	7th
Tengku Hilda	Researcher	38	Malaysia	Season 4	7th
Sunaina Gulia	Actress	31	India	Season 4	6th
Dimple Inamdar	Actress	32	India	Season 4	6th
Ethan Lim	Social worker	26	Malaysia	Season 4	5th
Mohamad Khairie	Student	25	Malaysia	Season 4	5th
Jacinta "Jess" James	Tattooist	27	Philippines^{8}	Season 4	4th
Lani Pillinger	Model	27	Philippines^{8}	Season 4	4th
Hussein B. Sutadisastra	Educator	53	Indonesia	Season 4	3rd
Natasha Sutadisastra	Legal administrator	24	Indonesia	Season 4	3rd
Claire Goh	Musician	21	Singapore	Season 4	2nd
Michelle Ng	Actress	22	Singapore	Season 4	2nd
Richard Hardin	Pro basketballer	34	Philippines^{6}	Season 4	1st
Richard Herrera	Actor	31	Philippines^{6}	Season 4	1st
Lisa Truong-Marchetto	Business manager	38	Vietnam	Season 5	11th
Nicole "Nic" Truong-Marchetto	Behavior analyst/psychologist	34	Vietnam	Season 5	11th
Rei Umehara	Entrepreneur	30	Singapore	Season 5	10th
Keiji Umehara	YouTuber	26	Singapore	Season 5	10th
Brandon Ho	TV host / radio DJ	23	Malaysia	Season 5	9th
Alphaeus Tan	Corporate finance executive	23	Malaysia	Season 5	9th
Rachel "Rach" Tampubolon	TV host	30	Indonesia	Season 5	8th
Vicky Harahap	Radio announcer	29	Indonesia	Season 5	8th
Will Chee	Sales agent	23	Malaysia	Season 5	7th
Alex Chee	Fitness model	21	Malaysia	Season 5	7th
Anita Silsith Bye	Student	24	Thailand	Season 5	6th
Tom William Barrett	Photographer / restaurateur	31	Thailand	Season 5	6th
Jerald Justin "JK" Ko	Radio DJ	29	Singapore	Season 5	5th
Michael "Mike" Tan	Radio DJ	29	Singapore	Season 5	5th
Treasuri Tamara	Lawyer	30	Indonesia	Season 5	4th
Louisa Kusnandar	TV presenter	29	Indonesia	Season 5	4th
Eric Tai	Host / athlete	34	Philippines^{3}	Season 5	3rd
Rona Tai	Business owner	34	Philippines	Season 5	3rd
Yvonne Lee	Emcee, model and entrepreneur	28	Malaysia	Season 5	2nd
Chloe Chen	Model	27	Malaysia	Season 5	2nd
Parul Shah	Beauty queen	28	Philippines	Season 5	1st
Maggie Wilson	Digital influencer	27	Philippines	Season 5	1st

== Contestant deaths ==
Henry Reed (53), May 21, 2013

== Gallery ==
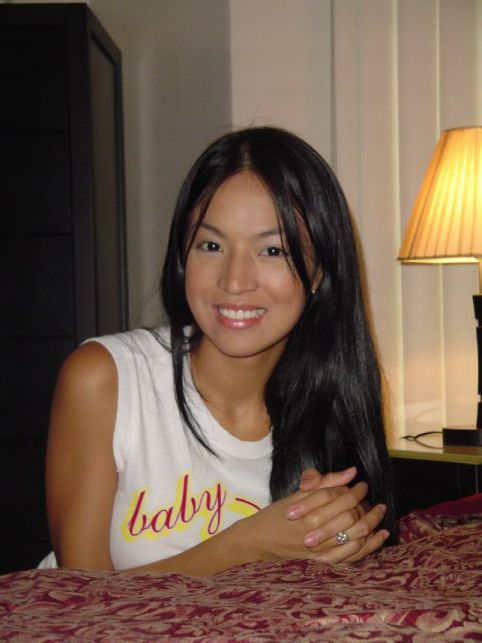
Aubrey Sandel from The Amazing Race Asia 1

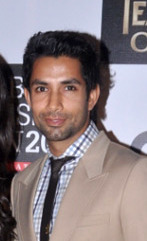
Sahil Shroff from The Amazing Race Asia 1

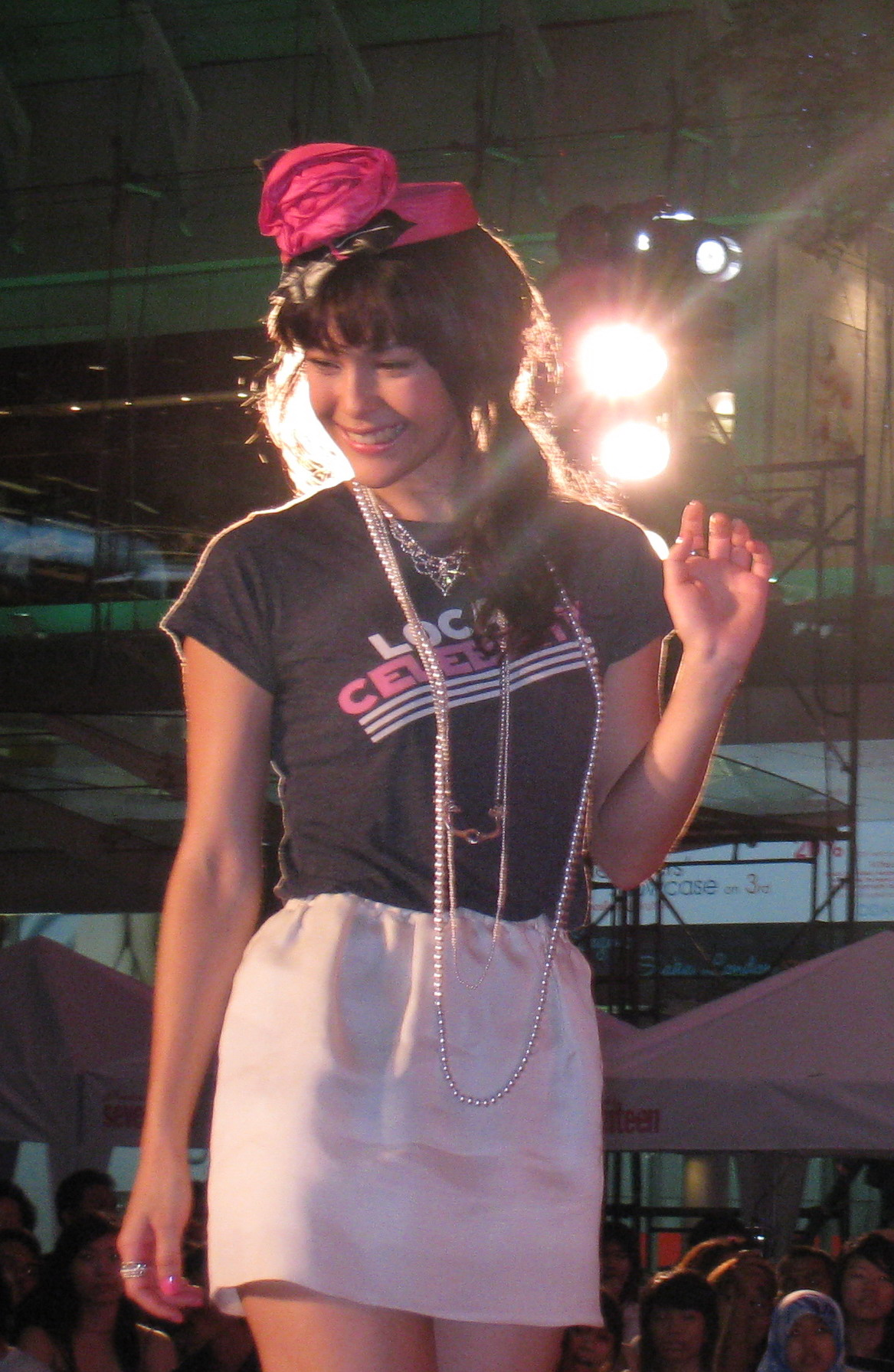
Paula Taylor from The Amazing Race Asia 2

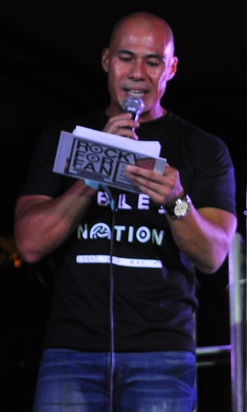
Rovilson Fernandez from The Amazing Race Asia 2

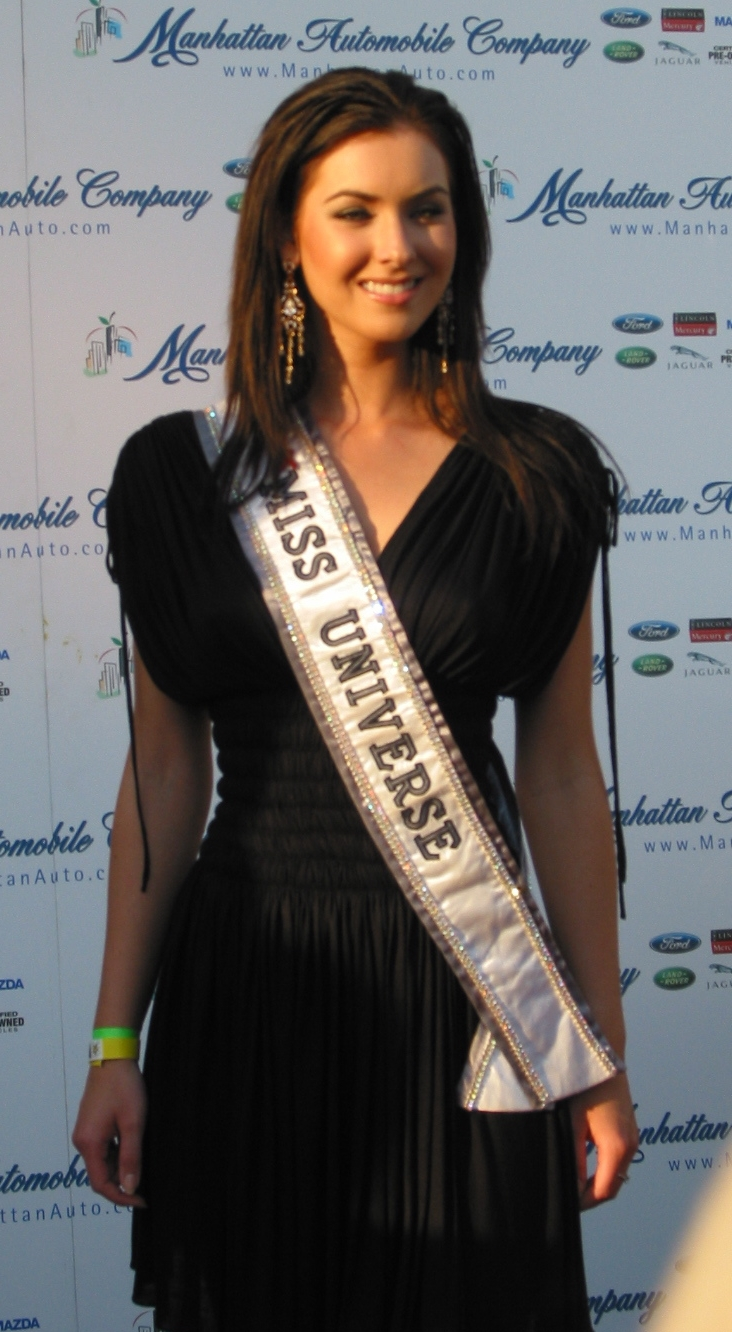
Natalie Glebova from The Amazing Race Asia 3

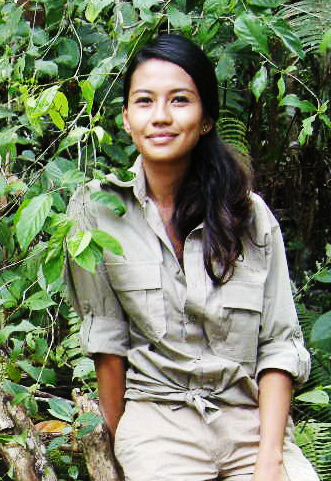
Nadine Zamira from The Amazing Race Asia 4

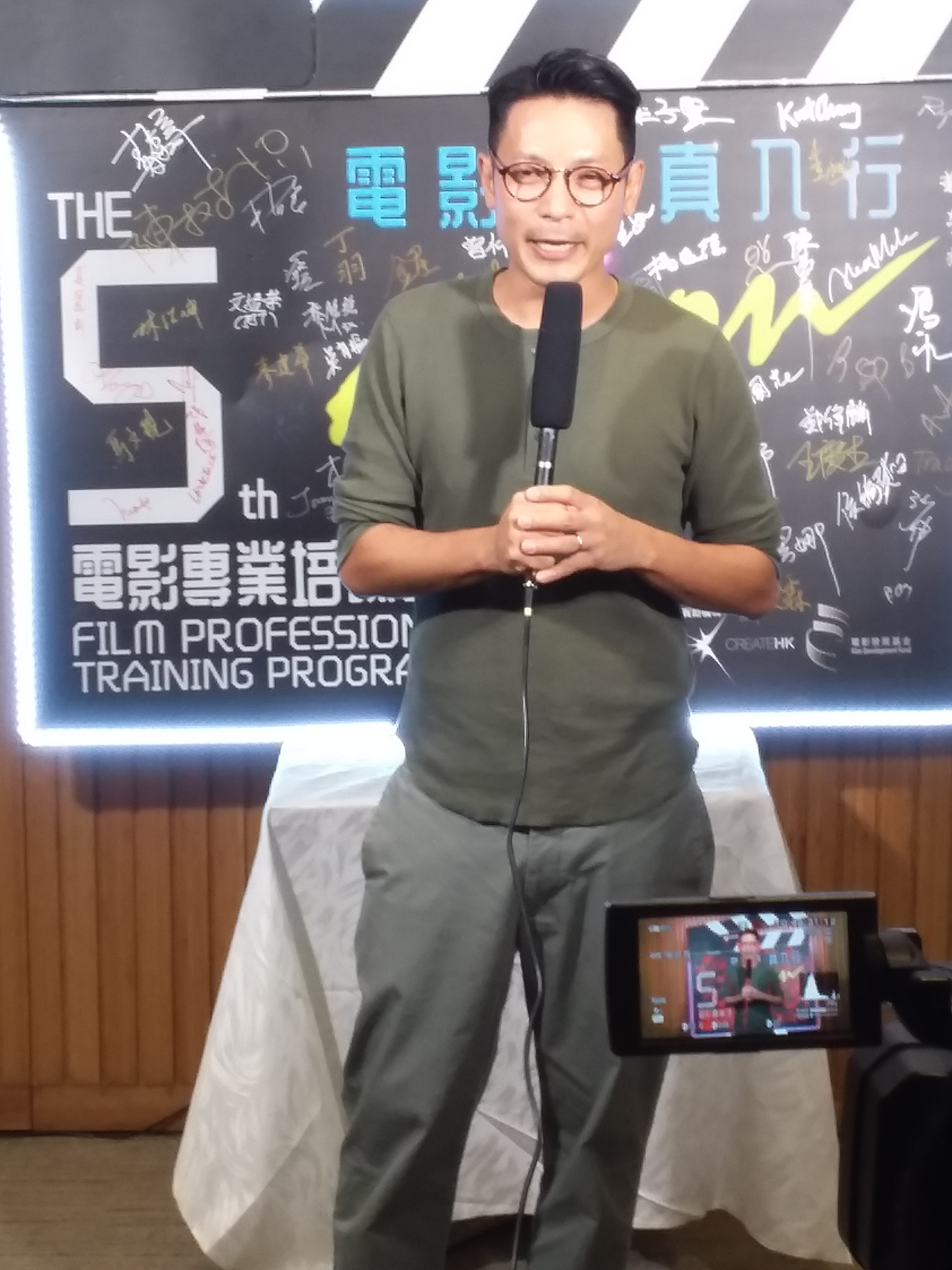
Alan Luk from The Amazing Race Asia 4

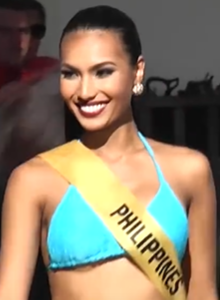
Parul Shah, winner of The Amazing Race Asia 5

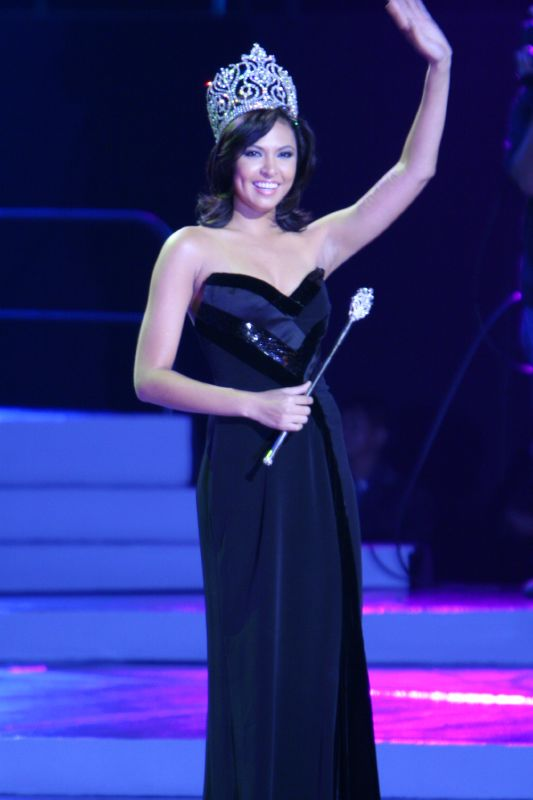
Maggie Wilson, winner of The Amazing Race Asia 5

== See also ==
List of The Amazing Race Asia winners

== Notes ==
1. Originally from the United Kingdom.
2. Originally from South Korea.
3. Originally from New Zealand.
4. Originally from Singapore.
5. Originally from France.
6. Originally from the United States.
7. Originally from Canada.
8. Originally from Australia.
9. Originally from Hungary.
