= Eric Tai =

Filipino actor

- Born: August 23, 1984 (age 42); New Zealand
- Other name: Eruption
- Occupations: Actor, television personality
- Years active: 2011–present
- Television: It's Showtime; The Amazing Race Asia 5
- Spouse: Rona Samson (m. 2015)
- Children: 1
- Height: 6 ft 0 in (1.83 m)

Rugby union career
Senior career
Years	Team	Apps	(Points)
–	Alabang Eagles	–	(–)
International career
Years	Team	Apps	(Points)
2010s	Philippines	–	(–)

Eric Tai (born August 23, 1984) is a New Zealand actor based in the Philippines. He is also a professional Arena of Valor esports player and former rugby union player who played for the Alabang Eagles and represented the Philippines national rugby union team in 15s and 7s. He was also one of the hosts of It's Showtime, where he went by the screen name Eruption.

== Early life ==
Tai was born in New Zealand and raised in Australia. He is of Tongan and Filipino ancestry. He was obsessed with video games and had an Atari for his first console. In high school, he became involved in various sports such as rugby, cricket, volleyball, and track and field.

Tai first came to the Philippines as a missionary for the Church of Jesus Christ of Latter-day Saints where he was able to serve a two-year mission in Naga, Camarines Sur.

== Rugby career ==
Tai was part of the Philippines national rugby union team in 2011. For two years he did not play for the national team. In 2013, he made his return to the national team. In club rugby, Tai played for the Alabang Eagles.

== Career ==
Before his stint in the Philippines, he was already pursuing a career in acting, commercial modelling, and hosting in Australia.

=== Television ===
He initially made a guest appearance on It's Showtime as a hurado, or judge, and showcased his dance skills in a performance. In 2012, he transitioned to a full-time hosting role on the show, adopting the screen name Eruption. Despite receiving offers to join other ABS-CBN television shows, he declined, expressing a desire to concentrate on his role in It's Showtime.

As part of McCann Erickson's "Everybody Break Now" advertising campaign for KitKat, Tai portrayed Dan, the Breakinator in a television commercial for the chocolate brand.

He took a break after his stint in a Canadian tour of It's Showtime in September 2014 and returned in December the same year.

Tai announced his departure from It's Showtime in early 2016. Co-host Coleen Garcia also left. His last appearance on the television show was in December 2015.

Tai along with his wife, Rona Samson joined the fifth season of The Amazing Race Asia as contestants.

Tai is formerly part of the action adventure series Bagani in 2018, in which he played a giant guy. This was Tai's first teleserye, followed by his second teleserye Ngayon at Kailanman in 2019 in which he played a bodyguard.

In 2023, Tai and his team won P200,000 when they competed on Family Feud. In that episode, he challenged host Dingdong Dantes to the "Ting Ting Tang Ting Dance Challenge".

=== Film ===
Tai appeared in Madaling Araw, Mahabang Gabi, an independent film which also featured Angelica Panganiban. In May 2012, Tai expressed his desire to act in an action film but said he did not find any opportunity to do so in the Philippines.

=== Hosting ===
Tai hosted Mobile Legends: Bang Bang Southeast Asia Cup 2019 (MSC 2019) held at the Smart Araneta Coliseum on June 21–23, 2018.

=== Modeling ===
Tai appeared on the cover of the first issue of the Philippine edition of Muscle & Fitness in 2016.

=== Online media ===
Tai went viral on TikTok while dancing on a train in Singapore in October 2022. He and his dance crew then started dancing to that tune in various locations and even got other celebrities to join them. He also received a Silver Play Button from YouTube in 2023.

=== Esports ===
In 2023, Tai joined the PBA Esports Bakbakan league. He was drafted 4th by Magnolia.

=== Music ===
In 2023, Tai released his first single "Do Your Ting", a collaboration with Mr. Mainit, DJ Loonyo, and Solomon Starks. He had also signed as a recording artist with Ingrooves Music Group (which is owned by Universal Music) that year.

== Personal life ==
Tai is married to Rona Samson. The two became engaged in August 2014 when Tai proposed to Samson in Albay. They got married in March 2015 at the Church of Jesus Christ of Latter-day Saints in Cubao, Quezon City. They got involved in a second marriage ceremony in May 2016. In 2015, Samson experienced a miscarriage and was informed by her doctor that she could only conceive a child with Tai through in vitro fertilisation. This led to the couple joining The Amazing Race Asia who planned to use the prize money to go through with the procedure. The couple has one child, Legend, born in 2019. Tai also said that his esports events paid him well and helped him through the process.

Video games is also a hobby of Tai which according to his wife proved beneficial for their stint in The Amazing Race. She said this hobby helped them in the puzzle solving aspect of the reality show.

== Filmography ==
=== Television ===
Year	Title	Role
2010 - 2011	Willing Willie	Host
2011 - 2015	It's Showtime	Host
2016	Family Feud	Celebrity contestant
2016	The Amazing Race Asia 5	Contestant (with wife, Rona)
2018	La Luna Sangre	Waya council member
2018	Bagani	Higante/Higa
2019	Ngayon at Kailanman	Neil
2020	Almost Paradise	
2023	Family Feud	Celebrity contestant
2024	Running Man Philippines Season 2	Contestant
2025	Incognito	Bruno
2025	Encantadia Chronicles: Sang'gre	Bukag
2026	The Master Cutter	Vladimir
2026	Kamao	Boy Saltik
2026	Sigabo	Bullet Sequioa

=== Film ===
- Shake Rattle & Roll 14 (2012)
- Madaling Araw, Mahabang Gabi (independent film; 2012)
- The Last Soldier (2019)
