= Lee Yvonne =

Malaysian host (born 1988)

- Born: 22 October 1988 (age 37); Klang, Selangor, Malaysia]
- Height: 1.70 m (5 ft 7 in)
- Beauty pageant titleholder
- Title: Miss World Malaysia 2012
- Hair colour: Black
- Eye colour: Black
- Major competitions: Miss World 2012 (Unplaced)

Lee Yvonne (born 22 October 1988 Selangor, Malaysia) is a Malaysian-Chinese TV host, model and beauty pageant titleholder. She also master of ceremonies and best known for her title as Miss World Malaysia 2012 and represented her country at Miss World 2012 in Ordos, Inner Mongolia, China.

== Personal life ==
Yvonne holds B.A. in Mass Communication from KDU University College

== Career ==
=== Pageantry and modeling ===
She started modeling at the age of 20 and since then has appeared in magazines such as Seventeen Magazine, FEMALE, Cleo, Cosmopolitan, MYC!, Sisters, Her World, Celebrities Media, FACES, Clive and Esquire. She has also appeared on the cover of Asia Bar Culture, KL Lifestyle magazine, Ezy Trader magazine and also Hypertune magazine. Yvonne starred in a local music video and won the title of Miss Veet 2008. The event has been described by organizers as encouraging contestants to have "confidence in displaying their smooth legs."

At the age of 21, Yvonne was crowned as Miss Malaysia Tourism Metropolitan 2009. Yvonne ventured full-time into emceeing at the end of year 2011 and she has hosted events for BMW, Petronas, Motorola, Kodak, Pandora, Proton, Genting, KPMG, Hyundai and Banana Republic.

In 2012, she won the Miss World Malaysia title beating sixteen other women around the country. Yvonne represented Malaysia at Miss World 2012 in Ordos, Inner Mongolia, China PR on August 18, 2012, but failed to place among the top sixteen semifinalists.

=== Television career ===
Yvonne participated on a reality-hosting program called Projek 3R and won with two other contestants to host 3R on TV3. In 2016, Lee competed in the fifth season of The Amazing Race Asia with Chloe Chen.

== Filmography ==
=== Television ===
Title	Year	Station	Role
The Amazing Race Asia 5	2016	AXN Asia	Herself (contestant)
3R	2013	TV3	Herself (host)
Projek 3R	2013	TV3	Herself (contestant)
