= Zabrina Fernandez =

Malaysian television producer (born 1979)

- Born: November 17, 1979 (age 46); Kuala Lumpur, Malaysia
- Occupation: Producer/Director
- Known for: The Amazing Race Asia; Season 1 winners
- Spouse: Darren Waide
- Children: Story Juliet Waide; Zayla Naluri Waide; Ever Alara Waide

Zabrina Fernandez (born November 17, 1979) is a Malaysian television producer. She was the first winner of The Amazing Race Asia, a franchise of the popular reality show The Amazing Race. Zabrina and Joe Jer was the first all-female team to win in The Amazing Race franchise and, at the time, were the first team to win without relying on a Fast Forward or a Yield and also the first winners to win only the final leg of the race.

Zabrina is the youngest of four siblings. Her mother is of Malay ethnicity and her father is Indian Malaysian. She is also the sister of Malaysian film director Joshua Fernandez and red fm DJ JJ Fernandez.

She is a producer/director and was attached to Ntv7 and Channel V. Following her stint at Channel V she freelanced regionally, working on a number of acclaimed television programs including The Amazing Race Asia (from season 2 onwards), The Apprentice Asia and The Amazing Race Australia Season 1 which won an International Emmy and The Amazing Race 24.

Zabrina co-founded Wildsnapper TV Sdn Bhd, a television and film production company based in Kuala Lumpur, Malaysia which is no longer in operations.

Zabrina made her film directorial debut alongside director Bernard Chauly in the film Lahzeye Bi Payan (In An Endless Instant/ Janji Zehan).

Zabrina continues to be a freelance producer and director. Since 2025, she is also an INELDA-trained end-of-life doula.

Zabrina and Joe Jer made an appearance during a pit stop of the race on episode 3 of The Amazing Race Asia 5, at Hean Boo Thean Temple Georgetown, Penang.
