= Bajra Sandhi Monument =

Monument and museum in Bali

Bajra Sandi Monument
- Monumen Bajra Sandhi ᬫᭀᬦᬸᬫᬾᬦ᭄ᬩᬚ᭄ᬭᬲᬦ᭄ᬟᬶ
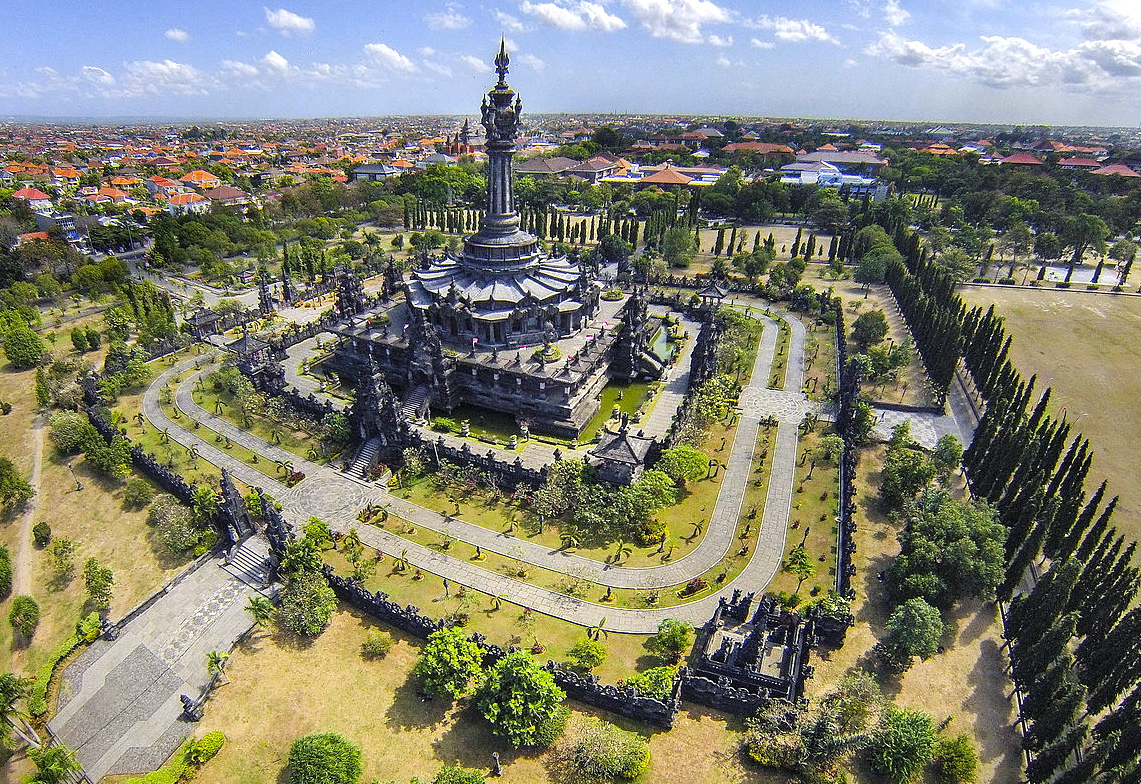
- Aerial view of the Bajra Sandhi monument

General information
- Type: Monument, museum
- Location: Denpasar, Bali
- Coordinates: 8°40′18″S 115°14′2″E
- Construction started: 1987
- Completed: 2001
- Opened: 2004
- Owner: Bali Provincial Government
- Operator: Bali Museum

Design and construction
- Structural engineer: Ir. Ida Bagus Yadnya

Bajra Sandhi Monument (Indonesian: Monumen Bajra Sandhi, Balinese script: ᬫᭀᬦᬸᬫᬾᬦ᭄ᬩᬚ᭄ᬭᬲᬦ᭄ᬟᬶ) is a monument to the struggles of the Balinese people throughout history. The monument is located in front of the Bali Governor's Office in Denpasar, Indonesia, on the island of Bali. The monument was built in 1987, and inaugurated by President Megawati Sukarnoputri on 14 June 2003.

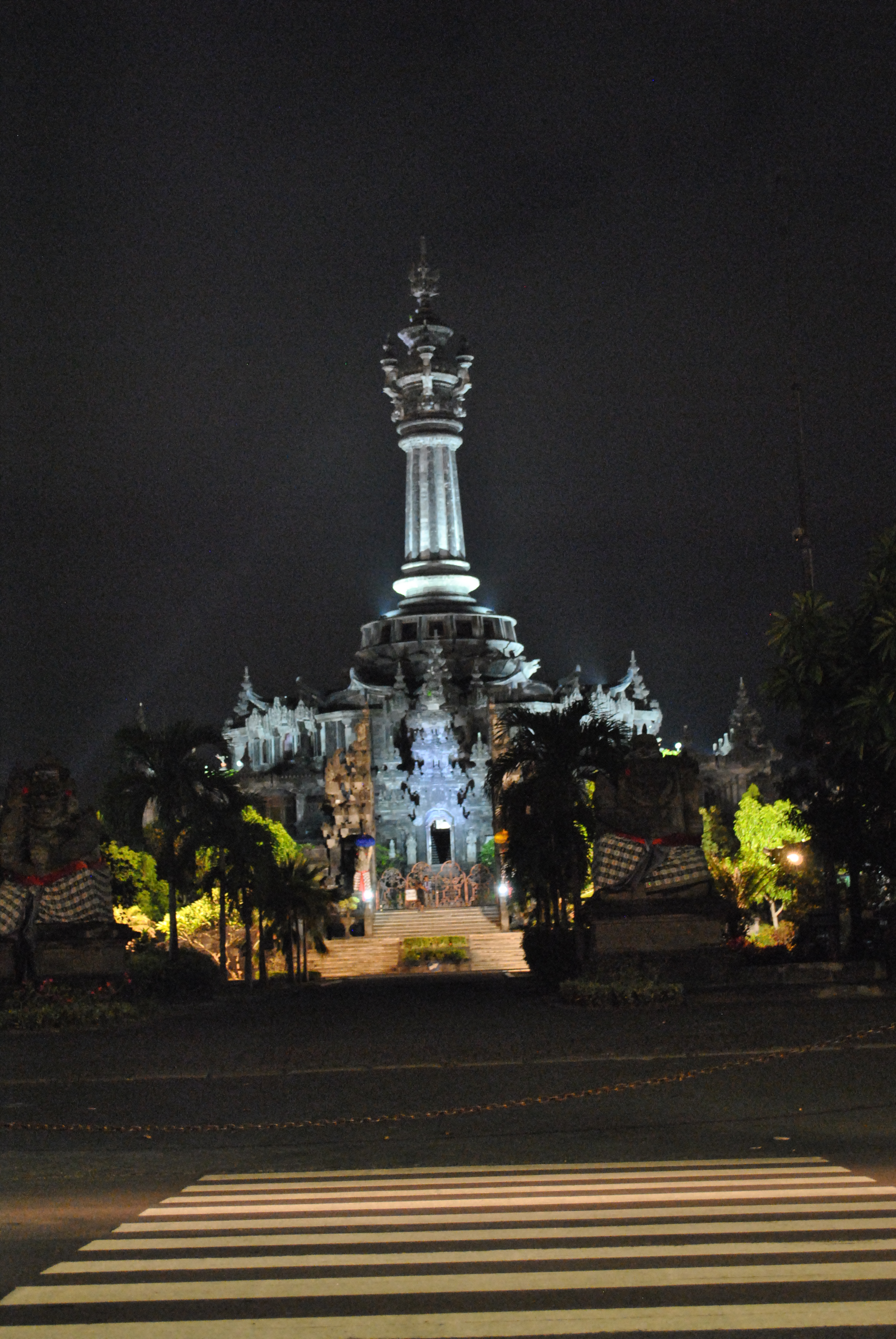
Entry point

== History ==
The Bajra Sandhi Monument was built on 13.8 ha of land with a building area of 4,900 m2. The Bajra Sandhi Monument was designed by Ida Gede in 1981.

The initiator of the idea to build this monument was Prof Ida Bagus Matra who was then serving as Governor of Bali, in 1980. The architect of this monument is Ir. Ida Bagus Gede Yadnya, the winner of the architectural competition for this monument in 1981. The architectural design of Ir. Ida Bagus Gede Yadnya has the meaning of the independence day of the Republic of Indonesia on August 17, 1945, with a design of 17 entrance gates, 8 main pillars and a monument height of 45 meters.

Bajra Sandhi Renon Monument, the initial construction began in 1981 then stopped and continued in 1987. The inauguration of the Bajra Sandhi Monument was carried out by the President at that time, Megawati Soekarno Putri, on June 14, 2003. Every year, in front of the Bajra Sandhi Monument, a Balinese arts festival parade is held which is usually opened by the President of Indonesia.

Important Balinese figures who are respected in the construction of this monument, including:

- I Gusti Ngurah Rai
- I Gusti Ketut Jelantik
- I Gusti Ketut Pudja

They are Balinese heroes who defended his rights against Dutch colonialism in 1848. So the Bajra Sandhi Monument was made to commemorate the Balinese heroes.

== Philosophy ==
This monument is known as "Bajra Sandhi" because its shape resembles a bajra or bell used by Balinese Hindu high priest in reciting Veda (mantra) during religious ceremonies.

Hindu Pedanda often use bells when reciting mantras in religious ceremonies. The Hindu elements in the Bajra Sandhi Monument are as follows.

- Jar of Amertha, symbolized by kumbha (a kind of pot) at the top of the monument
- Basuki Dragon Tail, near Swamba and its head on Kori Agung
- Bedawang Akupa Body, on the base of the monument, its head on Kori Agung
- Mount Mendara Giri, a towering monument
- The pool surrounding the monument, likened to Ksirarnawa (sea of milk)

== Interior ==
Inside there are 33 paintings and dioramas of the Balinese people's struggle against the invaders, as well as the history of the Bali Aga tribe. All the dioramas are stored on the 2nd floor of this museum. These dioramas depict important events in the history of the Balinese people from the prehistoric era to the era of Indonesian independence. All the dioramas are arranged sequentially, clockwise according to the order in which the events occurred.

Some of the important dioramas here depict the heroic events of the Battle of Puputan Klungkung, the events of Puputan Badung, the tearing of the Dutch letter by Patih I Gusti Ketut Jelantik, and the dissemination of the proclamation of independence 1945. For the entrance fee to the Bajra Sandhi monument, you can see below:

- Adults, IDR 25,000/person.
- Children, Kindergarten & Elementary School, IDR 2,000/child.
- Junior High School, High School & College Students, IDR 5,000/person.
- Car parking IDR 5,000/car.
- Motorcycle parking IDR 2,000/motorcycle.

Monument Opening Hours
| Day | Time WITA |
|---|---|
| Monday | 08.00–18.00 |
| Tuesday | 08.00–18.00 |
| Wednesday | 08.00–18.00 |
| Thursday | 08.00–18.00 |
| Friday | 08.00–18.00 |
| Saturday | 09.00–18.00 |
| Sunday | 10.00–18.00 |

== In popular culture ==
The monument was the 10th pit stop of The Amazing Race 28 and the Finish Line of The Amazing Race Asia 5.

== Gallery ==
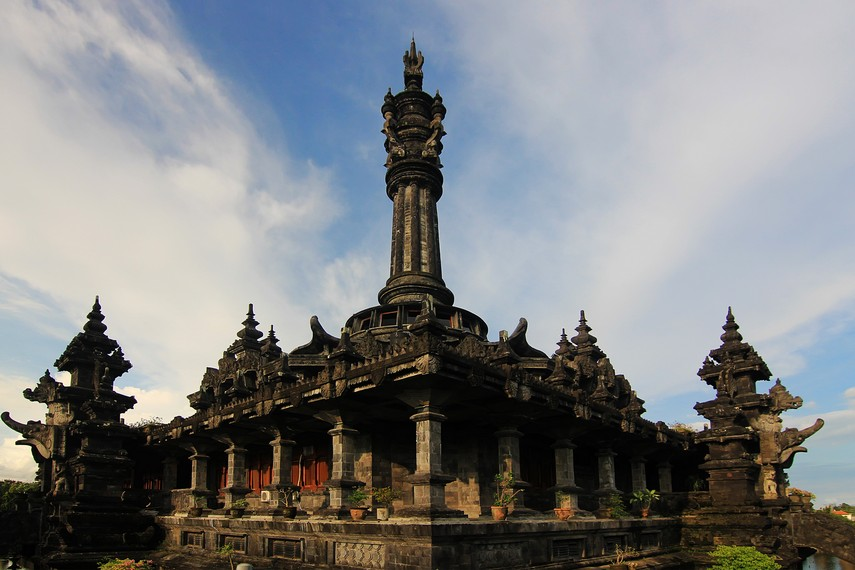
Bajra Sandhi from the side

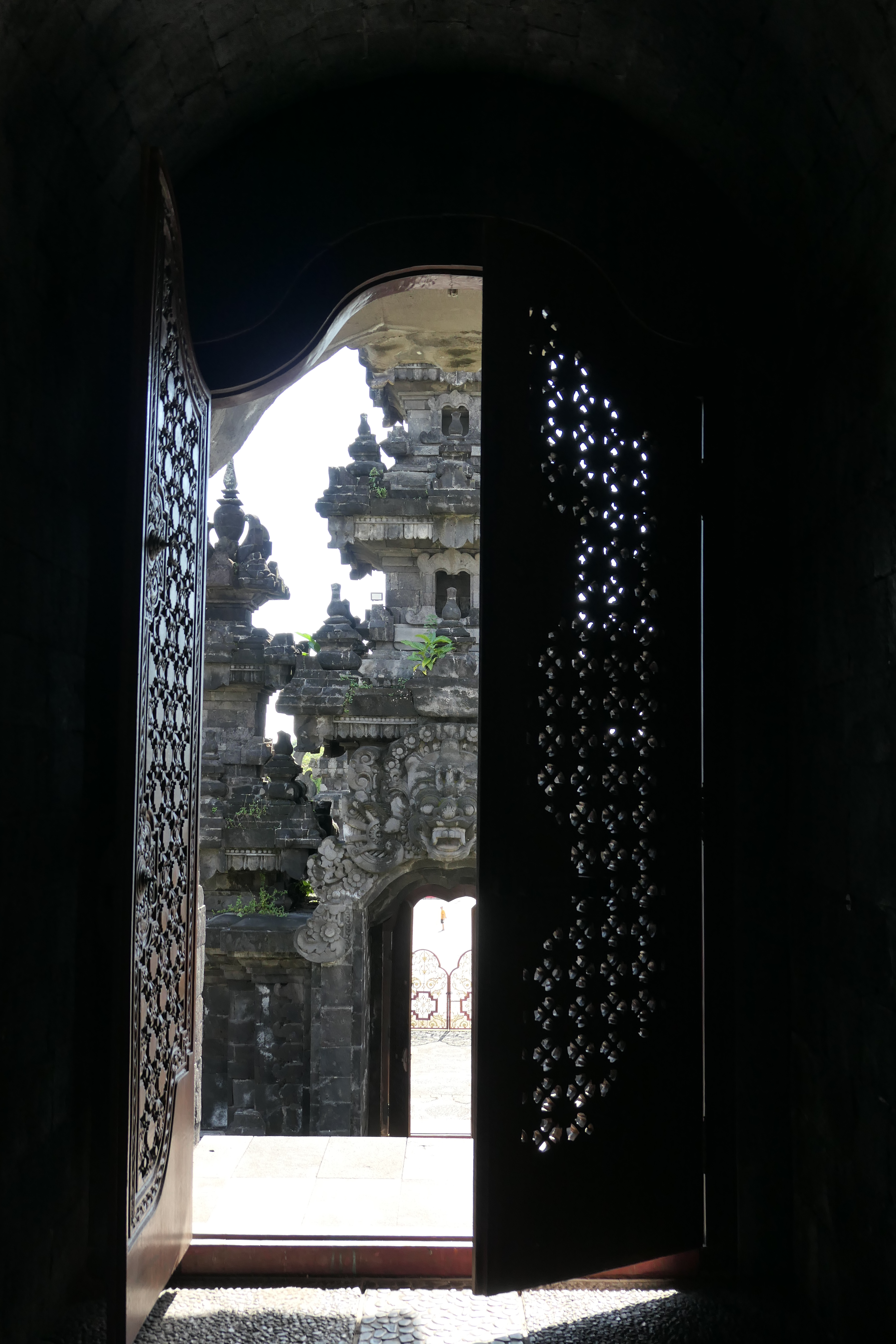
View of Kori Agung from the Bajra Sandhi Monument

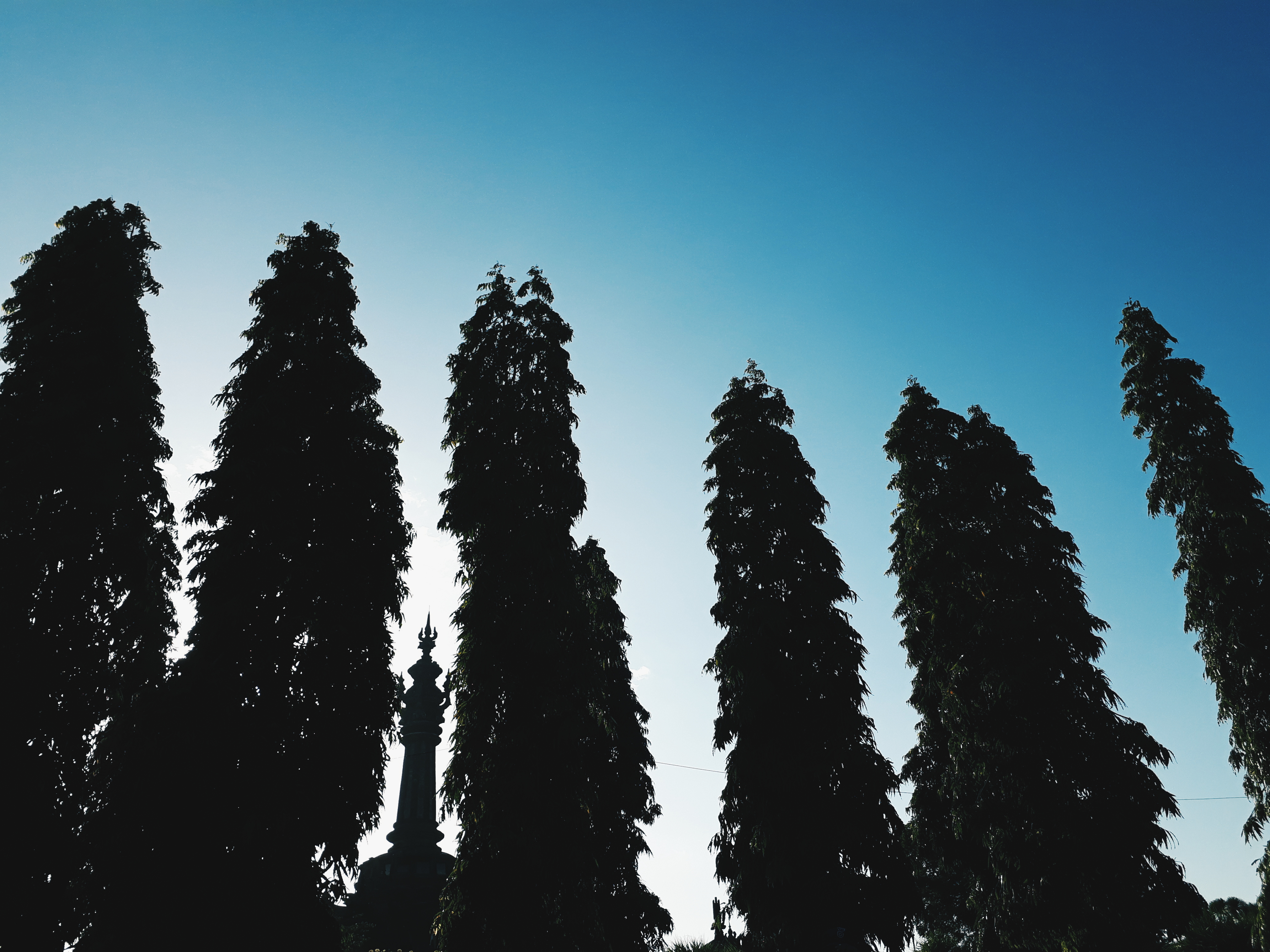
Bajra Sandhi Monument Silhouette
