= Turismo Pilipina 2008 =

2008 tourism encouraging event

- Date: 14 November 2008
- Presenters: NA
- Venue: NA
- Broadcaster: NA
- Entrants: 60

Turismo Pilipina 2008 is the 1st edition of Turismo Filipina. Its main objective is to encourage Filipinos from different provinces and those Filipinos abroad to rediscover Philippine Tourism. Former Miss International 2005, Lara Quigaman and other Beauty titleholders started this pageant.

Sherylee Sustiguer of Northern Samar was crowned by Miss Earth 2008, Karla Henry as the 1st ever Turismo Pilipina 2008. She will be the country's tourism ambassadress and will represent Philippines in international tourism pageants.

== Result ==
| Represents | Delegate | Placement |
|---|---|---|
| Northern Samar | Sherylee Sustiguer | Miss Turismo Filipina 2008 |
| Muntinlupa | Ferina De Paz | 1st Runner-up |
| Antique | Emmerie Cunanan | 2nd Runner-up |
| La Union | Anna Bautista | 3rd Runner-up |

== Candidates ==
| Representing | Delegates |
|---|---|
| Abra | Valerie Villanueva |
| Agusan del Norte | Karen Penanueva |
| Agusan del Sur | Patrice Su |
| Aklan | Goldie Laconsay |
| Antique | Emmerie Cunanan |
| Apayao | Kate Lao |
| Aurora | Joyce Molina |
| Basilan | Joanna Marie Salboro |
| Bataan | Christina Wells |
| Batangas | Aiza Magno |
| Benguet | Samantha Mercado |
| Bohol | Celeste Cajegas |
| Bulacan | Leilanie Dimacali |
| Cagayan | Paula Joy Cusipag |
| Caloocan | Keisha Gallardo |
| Camarines Norte | Menchie Parnaso |
| Camarines Sur | Elizabeth Naluz |
| Cavite | Jellaine Maquinay |
| Cotabato | Leah Baranascas |
| Davao del Norte | Karina Cabiling |
| Ilocos Norte | Jinky Janelle Miranda |
| Ilocos Sur | Mary An Areola |
| Iloilo | Grezilda Adelantar |
| La Union | Anna Bautista |
| Laguna | Sherly Hernandez |
| Lanao del Norte | Jazel Abella |
| Las Piñas | Michelle Dela Pena |
| Maguindanao | Sarah Mae Lim |
| Malabon | Jennifer Torres |
| Makati | Ana Maria Baladad |
| Mandaluyong | Maila Lomotan |
| Marikina | Paula Figueras |
| Marinduque | Beatriz Arenal |
| Masbate | Ana Katrina Jardin |
| Misamis Oriental | Kisha Elizalde |
| Mountain Province | Parul Shah |
| Muntinlupa | Ferina De Paz |
| Navotas | Shiela Marie Llorente |
| Northern Samar | Sherylee Sustiguer |
| Nueva Ecija | Ellaine Romasanta |
| Occidental Mindoro | Matchiko Matsuno |
| Palawan | Christine Barby Loreno |
| Pampanga | Lorraine Vargas |
| Pangasinan | Caitlin Tuazon |
| Parañaque | Marian Ong |
| Pasay | Cheryl Mae Maata |
| Quezon City | Roanne Aguilar |
| Quezon Province | Olive Adriano |
| Rizal | Risel Fortunado |
| Romblon | Michelle Romano |
| San Juan City | Mariel Ocampo |
| Shariff Kabunsuan | Sitti Montarino |
| Sorsogon | Delia Ojeda |
| South Cotabato | Lorradel Reyes |
| Surigao del Sur | Venus Anne Baluya |
| Tarlac | Cristina Ramos |
| Valenzuela | Anna Toneza |
| Zambales | Kimberly Brandon |
| Zamboanga del Norte | Anna Kristina Zason |
| Zamboanga del Sur | Thannia Mohamad |

=== Crossovers ===
- Grezilda "Adie" Adelantar
  - Miss Philippines Earth 2009 (Miss Philippines Eco-Tourism 2009 / 1st Runner-Up)
  - Binibining Pilipinas candidate.
- Kimberly Brandon
  - Miss Bikini Philippines 2009
- Anna Bautista
  - Miss Philippines Earth 2007 (Miss Philippines Eco-Tourism 2007 /4th Runner-up)
- Ana Maria Baladad
  - Mutya ng Pilipinas 2009 (Mutya ng Pilipinas – Overseas Communities)
- Christine Barby Loren, Leah Baranasca, Paula Figueras, Jinky Miranda, and Adie Adelantar all competed in Miss Philippines Earth 2009.
- Emmerie Cunanan
  - Miss Philippines Earth 2010 (Miss Philippines Water 2010 / 2nd Runner-up)
- Roanne Aguilar
  - Binibining Pilipinas 2010 (Top 10)
