= Parul Shah =

Filipino model

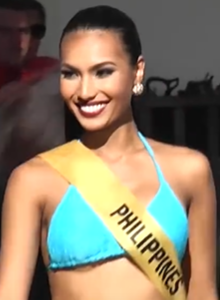
- Beauty pageant titleholder
- Title: Binibining Pilipinas Tourism 2014; Binibining Pilipinas Grand International 2015
- Major competitions: Binibining Pilipinas 2013; (Top 15); Binibining Pilipinas 2014; (Winner – Binibining Pilipinas Tourism 2014); (Appointed – Binibining Pilipinas Grand International 2015); Miss Grand International 2015; (3rd runner-up); (Best in National Costume)

Parul Quitola Shah is a Filipino-Indian model and beauty pageant titleholder who was crowned Binibining Pilipinas Tourism 2014 at the Binibining Pilipinas 2014. In 2015, she was appointed as Binibining Pilipinas Grand International 2015.

== Pageantry ==
She competed at the Binibining Pilipinas 2013 pageant and was chosen as one of the 15 semi-finalists. She decided to once again compete in Binibining Pilipinas and entered the 2014 edition on 30 March 2014, where she was crowned Binibining Pilipinas Tourism 2014 by the outgoing titleholder Binibining Pilipinas Tourism 2013, Joanna Cindy Miranda. However she could not compete in the said pageant as the pageant never happened. Parul Shah was handpicked to represent the Philippines at Miss Grand International 2015, where she placed 3rd Runner-up.

Shah represented the Mountain Province during the Turismo Pilipina 2008 pageant.

=== Post pageantry ===
In 2016, Shah won the fifth season of The Amazing Race Asia with Maggie Wilson.

Awards and achievements
| Preceded by Cindy Miranda | Binibining Pilipinas Tourism; 2014 | Succeeded by Ann Colis |
| Preceded by (Australia) Renera Thompson | 3rd Runner-up Miss Grand International; 2015 | Succeeded by (Puerto Rico) Madison Anderson |
| Preceded by None | Binibining Pilipinas Grand International; 2015 | Succeeded by Nicole Cordoves |
