= The Amazing Race Asia =

Asian adventure reality game show

- Genre: Reality competition
- Created by: Elise Doganieri; Bertram van Munster
- Based on: The Amazing Race by: Bertram van Munster; Elise Doganieri
- Presented by: Allan Wu; Tara Basro (season 5)
- Starring: The Amazing Race Asia contestants
- Theme music composer: John M. Keane
- Original language: English
- No. of seasons: 5
- No. of episodes: 57

Production
- Executive producer: Michael McKay
- Producers: Serena Lau; Ariel White
- Production location: See below
- Cinematography: Ryan Godard
- Editor: Tim Goldby
- Running time: 60–90 minutes
- Production companies: activeTV (2006–2010); Profiles Television (2016); Sony Pictures Television Networks (2016); Disney Media Distribution Asia Pacific (Note: Formerly known as Buena Vista International Television Asia Pacific and Disney-ABC International Television Asia Pacific)

Original release
- Network: AXN Asia
- Release: 9 November 2006 – 9 December 2010
- Release: 13 October – 15 December 2016

Related
- International versions

The Amazing Race Asia is an Asian reality competition show based on the American series The Amazing Race. Following the premise of other versions in the Amazing Race franchise, the show follows teams of two as they race across Asia and around the world. Each season is split into legs, with teams tasked to deduce clues, navigate themselves in foreign areas, interact with locals, perform physical and mental challenges, and travel by air, boat, car, taxi, and other modes of transport. Teams are progressively eliminated at the end of most legs for being the last to arrive at designated Pit Stops. The first team to arrive at the Finish Line wins the grand prize of US$100,000.

The Asian cable TV network AXN Asia was among the first to acquire the rights to produce a version of The Amazing Race for its territories. The first few seasons of the series were produced by Australian television production company ActiveTV and Sony Pictures Television Networks, in association with Disney Media Distribution (formerly as Buena Vista International Television-Asia Pacific (2006–2007), then Disney-ABC International Television (2007–2010)) and ABC Studios. Production was later taken over by creator Bertram Van Munster's production company Profiles TV in association with AXN. The host for the show is Singapore based Chinese-American actor Allan Wu.

In mid 2016, it was announced that the series would return in late 2016 after a six-year hiatus.

== The Race ==
The Amazing Race Asia is a reality television competition between teams of two in a race around the world. The race is divided into a number of legs wherein teams travel and complete various tasks to obtain clues to help them progress to a Pit Stop where they are given a chance to rest and recover before starting the next leg twelve hours later. The first team to arrive at a Pit Stop is often awarded a prize while the last team is normally eliminated (except in non-elimination legs, where the last team to arrive may be penalised in the following leg). The final leg is run by the last three remaining teams, and the first to arrive at the final destination wins the US$100,000 cash prize.

=== Teams ===
Each team is composed of two individuals who have some type of relationship to each other. A total of 80 participants have joined The Amazing Race Asia, many of which have been celebrities in their native country.

Because of the various languages spoken around Asia and the fact that the show is broadcast on an English-language network, participants are all required to be able to communicate in English. The contestants chosen to appear are from various Asian countries and not limited to one country of origin. Participating countries include all citizens of the continent of Asia except the Middle East, Laos, North Korea, Russia and East Timor, but including Palau and non-Asian workers who are living in Asia for a long period of time. From season 2 onwards, Japanese residents were eligible to participate, having been ineligible for season 1. Fiji was formerly able to apply, but as of Season five is no longer eligible.

=== Route Markers ===
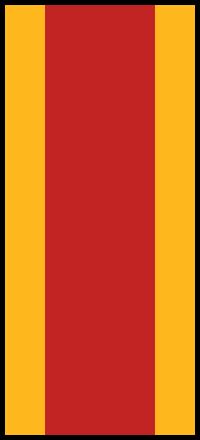

Route Markers are yellow and red flags that mark the places where teams must go. Most Route Markers are attached to the boxes that contain clue envelopes, but some may mark the place where the teams must go in order to complete tasks, or may be used to line a course that the teams must follow. Route Markers were, however, coloured yellow and white in the second leg of season 3 to avoid confusion with the flag of South Vietnam.

=== Clues ===
Clues are found throughout the legs in sealed envelopes, normally inside clue boxes. They give teams the information they need and tasks they need to do in order for them to progress through the legs.

- Route Info: A general clue that may include a task to be completed by the team before they can receive their next clue.
- Detour: A choice of two tasks. Teams are free to choose either task or swap tasks if they find one option too difficult.
- Roadblock: A task only one team member can complete. Teams must choose which member will complete the task based on a brief clue about the task before fully revealing the details of the task.
- Fast Forward: A task that only one team may complete, allowing that team to skip all remaining tasks and head directly for the next Pit Stop. Teams may only claim one Fast Forward during the entire season.

=== Obstacles ===
Teams may encounter the following that may affect their position:

- Yield: It is where a team can force another trailing team to wait a pre-determined amount of time before continuing the race. Teams may only use their ability to Yield another team once.
- Intersection: Introduced in season 2, it indicates that two teams must complete further tasks together until a clue indicates that they are no longer joined.
- U-Turn: Introduced in season 3, It is located after a Detour where a team can force another trailing team to complete the other option of the Detour they did not select. Teams may only use their ability to U-turn another team once. In Season 5, the U-Turn board was located at the Detour decision, before the Detour tasks (the first time the twist was introduced was during season 27 of the American Version).

In seasons 3 and 4, both the Yield and the U-Turn were seen in separate legs (the U-Turn replaced the Yield in the 12th season of the American version) and since a team can use each once during the season, it is therefore possible for a single team to use their U-Turn power even if they have already used their Yield power in a prior leg (Geoff and Tisha, season 3). In season 5, both of the Yield and U-Turn were featured and used in a same leg, marking the first ever season in all Amazing Race franchises to feature Yield and U-Turn in the same leg.

=== Legs ===
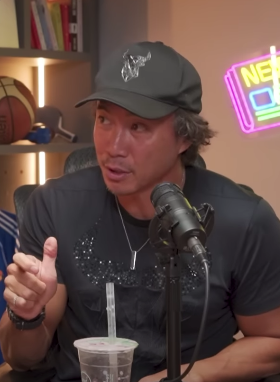
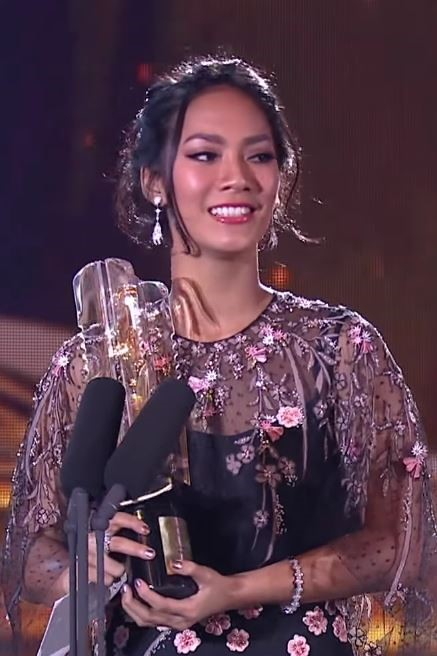
Hosts Allan Wu and Tara Basro

At the beginning of each leg, teams receive an allowance of cash, usually in U.S. dollars, to cover expenses during the legs (except for the purchase of airline tickets, which are paid-for by credit cards provided to the teams). Teams penalised for being last in certain non-elimination legs have to surrender all of their money and will not receive any allowance on the next leg.

Teams then have to follow clues and Route Markers that will lead them to the various destinations and tasks they will face. Modes of travel between these destinations include commercial and chartered airplanes, boats, trains, taxis, buses, and rented vehicles provided by the show, or the teams may simply travel by foot. Each leg ends with a twelve-hour Pit Stop where teams are able to rest and where teams that arrive last are progressively eliminated from the race until only three remain. In some legs, the first teams to arrive at the Pit Stop win prizes, usually from the show's sponsors.

In season 1, all teams were required to take show-sponsored AirAsia flights as opposed to choosing whatever airline they wished while in season 5, all teams were required to take race-sponsored Garuda Indonesia when travelling in and out of Indonesia.

The clue which directs a team to the Finish Line mentions it not as such but as a "Final Pit Stop". Instead of having an elevated red carpet with The Amazing Race logo enlarged on it as in the American edition, the Finish Line consists only of a regular check-in mat for the final three teams.

==== Non-elimination Legs ====
Each race has a number of predetermined non-elimination legs, in which the last team to arrive at the Pit Stop is not eliminated and is allowed to continue.

In all seasons except the third and fifth, the first leg was a non-elimination leg. By comparison, the fifteenth American season was the first season to have the first leg being a non-elimination one, although there was an elimination at the start of that season. Before this, the first leg had always been an elimination one. The first season that has a non-elimination leg in the style of the American one that has no one being eliminated at first is season 18.

===== Stripped of money and belongings =====
In season one through three, the last team to check in was stripped of all their money and was not given any money at the start of the next leg, forcing that team to literally beg for money from the local population of the city they were in for such expenses as cab, bus, or train fare.

===== Marked for elimination =====
Used from season 2 to 4, a team that comes in last on a non-elimination leg were "marked for elimination"; if they did not come in first on the next leg, they would receive an immediate 30-minute penalty upon checking in at the mat, possibly allowing other teams to catch up and check in ahead of them at the pit stop during their penalty time; if all the trailing teams were to check in during the penalty, the penalized team could fall to last place and could be eliminated unless they receive another penalty at the end of the next leg.

===== Speed Bump =====
The Speed Bump sign appears above the clue box where the team who checked in last in the previous Pit Stop during a non-elimination leg must do the Speed Bump task on the leg after the non-elimination Leg before continuing.

Introduced in season 5, the penalty for finishing last in a non-elimination leg is that the affected team will have to perform a "Speed Bump" task at some point during the next leg. Teams would be alerted to the upcoming Speed Bump by a Route Marker clue prior to it, while the Speed Bump itself is displayed in a manner similar to the Yield showing the affected team's picture at a stand near to the regular Route Marker. Once the team completes the Speed Bump task, they may receive the next clue that they would have gotten at the Route Marker, or they may have to backtrack to the location of the clue box to get their next clue, depending on the task. If the team fails to complete the Speed Bump, they will receive a four-hour penalty at the Pit Stop. The tasks that teams have been called on to perform are generally not very difficult or time-consuming, and the majority of teams that have been hit by the Speed Bump have recovered from it quickly enough to avoid immediate elimination.

==== Unusual eliminations ====
- The first unusual elimination occurred in season 5 where only 10 clues were available, and the Race began with eleven teams. After ten teams completed the task at the starting line and received their next clue, the last team remaining was eliminated and at the Pit Stop later, the last team was also being eliminated.

==== Double-length Legs and No-Rest Leg ====
Like in the show's American counterpart, The Amazing Race Asia has featured double-length legs or "superlegs". These occur when teams reach a Virtual Pit Stop. They are told that "the leg is not over" and are given their next clue to continue racing. Teams have not received prizes for coming in first at a Virtual Pit Stop, nor penalties for coming in last.

In season 1, teams were instructed to "Find Allan Wu", avoiding the term Pit Stop. In season 2, the checkpoint was alluded to being normal Pit Stops. On-screen graphics displaying "Proceed to Pit Stop" were used on the show so that viewers wouldn't guess that a superleg was coming up. Season 4 introduced a No-Rest Leg, also known as the "continue racing" leg, in which teams are checked in at a Pit Stop as normal, after which they are told that the next leg is to begin immediately and are handed their next clue. Typically all teams can continue racing onto the next leg at a no-rest Pit Stop.

=== Rules and penalties ===
Most of the rules and penalties are adopted directly from the American edition; but in some of cases, the Asian version has been seen to have a unique set of additional rules.

==== Rules ====
- Each team will have to sign a confidentiality agreement preventing themselves from revealing the details of the season before airing. Teams will be fined with five million U.S. dollars if the contract is breached.
- If a team member is injured during the race, he/she has to pass medical evaluation to ensure they are fit to continue racing. In the American edition, if the injury is not serious or life-threatening, the team may choose to continue or quit. This occurred to Marshall & Lance during season 5. Margie suffered heatstroke at the end Leg 7 in season 14 and their team was allowed to continue.
- Teams must follow local road laws and regulations and be responsible to pay any fines and demerits they incur.

==== Penalties ====
- If teams violate speeding laws, the number of minutes for the time penalty is the amount of speed in kilometers per hour that the team traveled minus the legal speed limit then multiplied by two minutes. However, this penalty is only served at the beginning of the next leg of the race, and causes criticisms from among the teams (see criticisms). While speeding is also against the rules in the American version (as shown in season 2 and season 13), the penalty is not given in a measurement of time additional miles per hour over the speed limit but rather of time gained plus an additional 30 minutes.
- In the American edition, the teams who quit a Roadblock must serve a four-hour penalty assessed starting from when the next team arrives at the task site, whereas in the Asian edition, this four-hour penalty applies at the Pit Stop prior to checking in and not at the Roadblock itself.
- Hitchhiking (travelling in privately owned vehicles) is prohibited; if a team violates this rule, they incur a one-hour penalty. In the American version, a hitchhiking team generally does not incur a time penalty. But if the clue says that the team must take an appropriate form of transportation, they are asked to go back and take it as directed (Nathan & Jennifer, season 12). Note that Nathan & Jennifer committed this mistake on their way to the Pit Stop and had been possible to correct the mistake whereas Sahil & Prashant (season 1) committed their mistake for one of the earlier tasks in the leg and may not be corrected before receiving their next clue. However, Richard & Richard in season 4 were asked to go back to their original location before returning to their destination when they hitchhiked.

== Seasons ==
The show first aired in 2006 with the first season premiere airing in November 2006 and ending in February 2007. The first three seasons were aired yearly, but season 4 was delayed by a year and returned to television in 2010.

Season	Broadcast		Winners	Teams	Host	Viewers (in millions)
Season	Premiere date	Finale date	Winners	Teams	Host	Viewers (in millions)
1	9 November 2006	1 February 2007	Malaysia: Zabrina Fernandez & Joe Jer Tee	10	Allan Wu	15 million
2	22 November 2007	14 February 2008	Singapore: Adrian Yap & Collin Low	10	Allan Wu	17.5 million
3	11 September 2008	20 November 2008	Hong Kong: Vince Chung & Sam Wu	10	Allan Wu	18.8 million
4	23 September 2010	9 December 2010	Philippines: Richard Hardin & Richard Herrera	10	Allan Wu	19.3 million
5	13 October 2016	15 December 2016	Philippines: Parul Shah & Maggie Wilson	11	Allan Wu; Tara Basro (Note: Tara Basro hosted only the legs in Indonesia.)	N/A

== Countries and locales visited ==
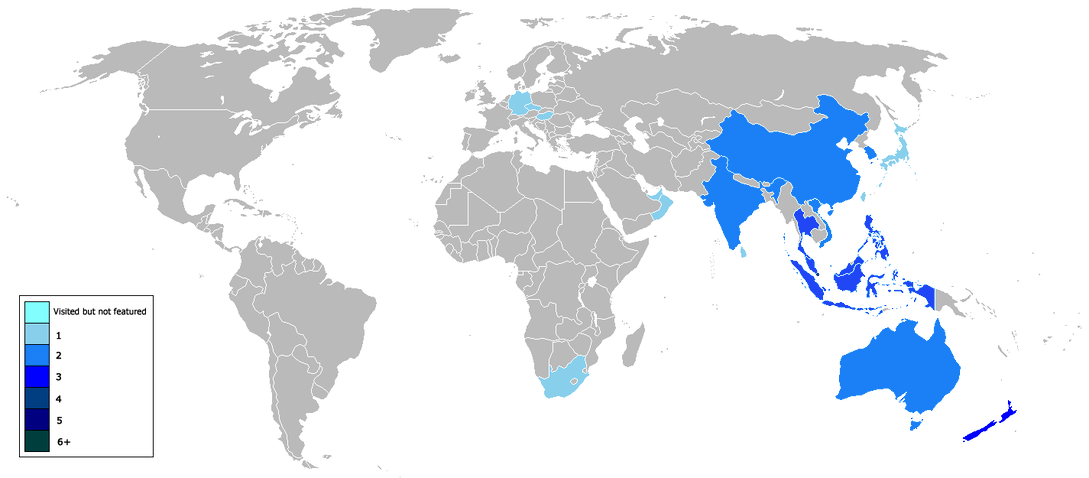
Countries that The Amazing Race Asia has visited are shown in colour.

As of 15 December 2016, The Amazing Race Asia has visited 20 countries and has visited four continents.

=== Asia ===
Rank	Country	Season visited	Pit Stops
1	Singapore	4 (1, 2, 4, 5)	3^{3}
2	Indonesia	3 (1, 4, 5)	7
2	Malaysia	3 (1, 4, 5)	5^{3}
2	Thailand	3 (1, 3, 5)	5^{3}
2	Philippines	3 (2, 4, 5)	4
6	India	2 (1, 3)	3
6	South Korea	2 (2, 4)	3
6	Vietnam	2 (3, 5)	3
6	China^{2}	2 (2, 3)	2
10	Sri Lanka	1 (4)	2
10	Taiwan	1 (3)	2
10	United Arab Emirates	1 (1)	2
10	Japan	1 (2)	1
10	Oman	1 (3)	1

=== Europe ===
Rank	Country	Season visited	Pit Stops
1	Czech Republic	1 (2)	2
1	Hungary	1 (2)	2
1	Germany	1 (2)	0

=== Africa ===
Rank	Country	Season visited	Pit Stops
1	South Africa	1 (2)	1

=== Oceania ===
Rank	Country	Season visited	Pit Stops
1	New Zealand	3 (1, 2, 4)	5
2	Australia	2 (1, 4)	3

=== Notes ===
1. This count only includes countries that fielded actual route markers, challenges or finish mats. Airport stopovers are not counted or listed.
2. Only visited the Special Administrative Regions of Hong Kong (2, 3) and Macau (3).
3. ^{a} ^{b} ^{c} Includes 5 Finish Lines

== Reception ==
=== Ratings ===
The premiere episode of Season 1 was highly successful and was the No. 1 show in its timeslot in Singapore and Malaysia and No. 2 in the Philippines, as well as No.1 in its timeslot for Adults 18-39 in New Zealand. The ratings for the finale of its second season increased over that of Season 1 in Malaysia and Singapore. In Season 3 the show reached 18.8 million viewers in selected countries, and in its first three seasons it reached over 34 million viewers across Asia. It was the highest rated program of its timeslot among all international channels in Singapore, Malaysia, the Philippines and Hong Kong. The fourth season of The Amazing Race Asia, saw a 71% increase in average ratings over the previous season country of the winning team. Overall it had a viewing audience of 19.3 million viewers across Asia. The fifth season returned after a six-year hiatus, and its premiere and finale were the highest rated show in its timeslot among all regional English language entertainment pay-TV channels in Singapore, Malaysia and the Philippines.

=== Awards and nominations ===
The show has won consecutive Asian Television Awards for "Best Adaptation of an Existing Format" in 2008 and 2009. Its third season was nominated for an International Emmy in 2009. After returning from a six-year hiatus, the show swept all three nominations at the Asian Television Awards.

Summary of Awards and Nominations
Year	Award	Category	Nominated	Result
2008	Asian Television Awards	Best Adaptation of an Existing Format	Season 2, Episode 11	Won
2009	Asian Television Awards	Best Adaptation of an Existing Format	Season 3, Episode 3	Won
2009	International Emmy	Best Non-Scripted Entertainment	—N/a	Nominated
2017	Asian Television Awards	Best General Entertainment Programme	—N/a	Won
2017	Asian Television Awards	Best Reality Show	—N/a	Won
2017	Asian Television Awards	Best Adaptation of an Existing Format	—N/a	Won

== Criticisms ==
=== Time penalties ===
Season 1 has seen a greater use of time penalties. While time penalties were generally served prior to the team being allowed to check into the Pit Stop (therefore possibly pushing them down the ranking lists and opening them to a possible last place finish and certain elimination, as was the case with Sahil & Prashant in Leg 5, Season 1), controversy has arisen over the fact that some time penalties are served at the beginning of the next leg.

This was the case with Andy & Laura, who departed the Chard Farm Winery Pit Stop in Queenstown at the start of Leg 7 with a 92-minute time penalty as a result of Andy's speeding in Leg 6. Had this 92-minute penalty been applied prior to Andy & Laura being allowed to check into the Pit Stop at the end of Leg 6, it would have pushed them into last place and certain elimination. Melody & Sharon, who were eliminated in that leg of the Race revealed in a press interview that they were really shocked that this 'speeding rule' did not apply at the Pit Stop, despite having learnt how the rules could be applied.

=== Miscellaneous criticism ===
Despite the success of the first season, many fans criticised that teams did not always "self-drive" to their next destination. Fans also criticised the fact that teams were always clumped in the same flight. This was according to an interview with Wu. The second season promised to tackle these issues. Others have criticized the show for blatant commercialism of their sponsors on the show. This is most prevalent in tasks that involve the use of high definition cameras as well as the prizes of leg races that are usually technological gadgets supplied by sponsors, rather than vacations and trips like the show's American counterpart (which is sponsored by Travelocity). The executive producer and co-creator of The Amazing Race, Bertram van Munster, conceded that there were more product placements, but said that they had much less money to work with for The Amazing Race Asia, that he was "not too crazy about blatant product placement, but the bill has to be paid." There was also criticism in the ambiguity of clues and the supposed impossibility of completing some of the tasks in season 1, in particular the roadblock in Leg 3 which saw 5 out of the 9 teams fail to complete the roadblock. In addition, ambiguous clues like 'you know it when you see it' led to some teams going around in circles searching for clues.

== International broadcast ==
In 2010, The first three seasons of the show premiered with Hungarian voiceovers in Hungary on AXN Hungary and Animax Eastern Europe as "The Amazing Race Ázsia" on Saturday and Sunday afternoons from 7 February.
