= The Amazing Race Asia 5 =

- Season 5
- The Amazing Race Asia logo since season 5
- Presented by: Allan Wu; Tara Basro
- No. of teams: 11
- Winners: Parul Shah & Maggie Wilson
- No. of legs: 10
- Distance traveled: 12,000 km (7,500 mi)
- No. of episodes: 10

Release
- Original network: AXN Asia
- Original release: 13 October – 15 December 2016

Additional information
- Filming dates: 7 August – 26 August 2016

Series chronology
- ← Previous; Season 4

The Amazing Race Asia 5 is the fifth season of The Amazing Race Asia, an Asian reality competition show based on the American series The Amazing Race. It returned after a 6-year hiatus and featured eleven teams of two for the first time in the Asia's version of franchise, each with a pre-existing relationship, in a race across Southeast Asia to win US$100,000.

This season visited in the entirety of Southeast Asia travelled over 12,000 kilometres (7,500 mi) during ten legs. Starting in Jakarta, teams travelled across Indonesia, alongside Malaysia, Thailand, Vietnam, the Philippines, Singapore, before returning to Indonesia in the last three legs. The season premiered on AXN Asia on 13 October 2016, and the finale aired on 15 December 2016.

Allan Wu returned to host his fifth season of The Amazing Race Asia and eleventh season of The Amazing Race franchise overall. Wu was paired up with Tara Basro, an Indonesian film actress, in hosting this season while in Indonesia.

Beauty queens Parul Shah and Maggie Wilson from the Philippines were the winners of this season, marking the Philippines's second consecutive win in The Amazing Race Asia, while fellow beauty queens Yvonne Lee and Chloe Chen from Malaysia finished second and Philippine married couple Eric and Rona Tai finished third.

== Production ==
=== Development and filming ===
The fifth season of The Amazing Race Asia started at Merdeka Square overlooking Monas in the Indonesian capital city of Jakarta.

On 20 May 2016, Sony Pictures Television (SPT) Networks Asia announced that The Amazing Race Asia would return for its fifth season after a six-year long hiatus and would be broadcast by AXN Asia. The tagline for this season was "most adrenaline-fueled season ever". This season adopted the American-style title sequence (based on Season 23). The Minister of Tourism of Indonesia, Arief Yahya, revealed the season's destinations beginning in Jakarta and traveling to local Indonesian destinations along with Singapore, Kuala Lumpur, Ho Chi Minh City, and Manila before finishing in Bali. There was a planned visit to Taipei, Taiwan, but it was scrapped last minute and was replaced by the Phuket, Thailand leg. This season covered 12,000 km (7,500 mi), the shortest route of The Amazing Race Asia, and mostly focused the competition in Indonesia, where the Starting Line and the Finish Line were held (the first time since Season 3 to do so in the same country, although the Starting Line and Finish Line were located in different cities), with the remaining countries in Southeast Asia.

Though both Wu and Basro were present at the Starting Line, Indonesian Deputy Minister for International Tourism Marketing I Gede Pitana officially flagged the teams off. This was the first time in any edition worldwide that the host did not officially signal the start of the competition. Pitana also appeared at the Finish Line as a greeter. In other legs conducted in Indonesia, Basro would take the place of the greeter.

This season introduced a new twist: the Speed Bump. Similar to the American version, the team that placed last in the non-elimination leg had to perform a Speed Bump somewhere in the next leg before they could continue racing. This season also for the first time in The Amazing Race Asia featured 11 teams, which the number 11th teams were eliminated at the starting line task (same as Season 15 of the American version and Season 3 of China Rush). Unlike the first leg in Season 15 of the American version and the first leg of Season 3 of China Rush, both in which the last team that arrived at the Pit Stop was told that it was a non-elimination leg, this version's first leg also ended with a standard end-of-leg elimination.

This season was also the first time in The Amazing Race Asia that a U-Turn board was placed at the Detour decision point, during Leg 9, rather than after the Detour itself (the first time this twist was introduced in all franchises was in the tenth leg of the 27th American version). Leg 9 is also the first leg in all franchises of The Amazing Race where both Yield and U-Turn were present in the same leg.

SBS Transit bus in Singapore with an Amazing Race Asia advertisement

=== Casting ===
Casting began on 23 May 2016, and applications were closed on 30 June 2016 (18 days extended from the original deadline of 12 June 2016).

=== Marketing ===
Wonderful Indonesia, Grab, Garuda Indonesia, and Great Eastern Life were sponsors for the season. It was also the first season that was not sponsored by Sony or Caltex.

== Casting ==
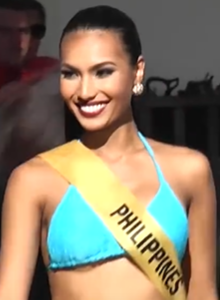
Parul Shah

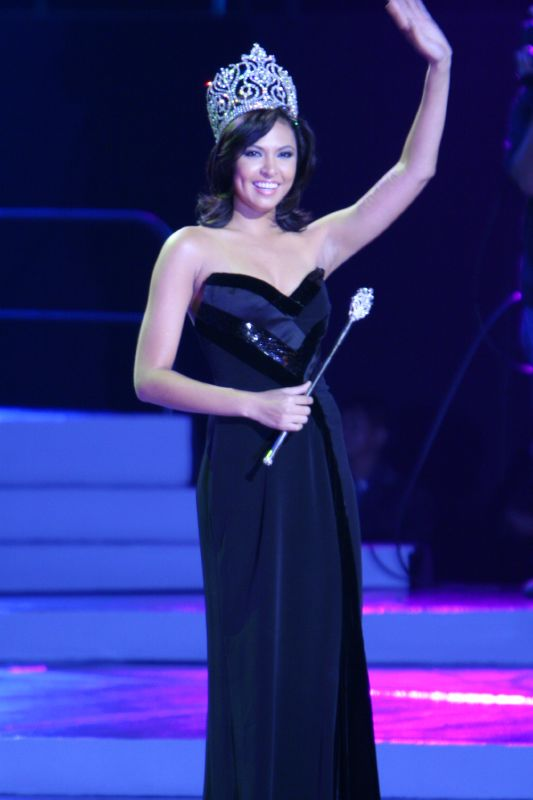
Maggie Wilson

The list of teams with their relationships at the time of filming were announced on 28 July 2016 on the AXN website. Continuing the casting trend of the Asian franchise, the cast once again consisted of numerous local celebrities or their relatives including 87.6 Hard Rock FM radio announcer Vicky Harahap, Philippines national rugby union team member and host of It's Showtime Eric Tai, Miss Grand International 2015 Parul Shah and Miss Philippines World 2007 Maggie Wilson, Miss Malaysia World 2011 Chloe Chen and Miss Malaysia World 2012 Yvonne Lee, The 8TV Quickie host Brandon Ho, News One Prime Time news anchor Louisa Kusnandar, Power 98 Radio DJs Jerald Justin "JK" Ko & Michael "Mike" Tan, and "UMeAndHara" YouTuber Rei Umehara. Tai is the only non-Asian contestant in the entire season.

This is the first season not to feature a team from Hong Kong, but also the first with a Vietnamese team.

Yvonne Lee was seen dating host Allan Wu after the show.

Contestants	Age	Relationship	Hometown	Status
Lisa Truong-Marchetto	38	Life Partners	Ho Chi Minh City, Vietnam	Eliminated 1st (in Jakarta)
Nicole Truong-Marchetto	34	Life Partners	Ho Chi Minh City, Vietnam	Eliminated 1st (in Jakarta)
Rei Umehara	30	Siblings	Singapore	Eliminated 2nd (in Bogor, West Java)
Keiji Umehara	26	Siblings	Singapore	Eliminated 2nd (in Bogor, West Java)
Alphaeus Tan	23	School Friends	Kuala Lumpur, Malaysia	Eliminated 3rd (in Subang, West Java)
Brandon Ho	23	School Friends	Kuala Lumpur, Malaysia	Eliminated 3rd (in Subang, West Java)
Rach Tampubolon	30	Travel Hosts	Jakarta, Indonesia	Eliminated 4th (in Thalang, Thailand)
Vicky Harahap	29	Travel Hosts	Jakarta, Indonesia	Eliminated 4th (in Thalang, Thailand)
Will Chee	23	Muscle Brothers	Kuala Lumpur, Malaysia	Eliminated 5th (in Ho Chi Minh City, Vietnam)
Alex Chee	21	Muscle Brothers	Kuala Lumpur, Malaysia	Eliminated 5th (in Ho Chi Minh City, Vietnam)
Anita Bye	24	Dating	Bangkok, Thailand	Eliminated 6th (in Bantay, Philippines)
Tom Barrett	31	Dating	Bangkok, Thailand	Eliminated 6th (in Bantay, Philippines)
JK Ko	29	Radio DJs	Singapore	Eliminated 7th (in Yogyakarta, Yogyakarta)
Mike Tan	29	Radio DJs	Singapore	Eliminated 7th (in Yogyakarta, Yogyakarta)
Treasuri Tamara	30	Best Friends	Jakarta, Indonesia	Eliminated 8th (in Glagah, East Java)
Louisa Kusnandar	29	Best Friends	Jakarta, Indonesia	Eliminated 8th (in Glagah, East Java)
Eric Tai	34	Married Couple	Quezon City, Metro Manila, Philippines	Third Place
Rona Tai	34	Married Couple	Quezon City, Metro Manila, Philippines	Third Place
Yvonne Lee	28	Beauty Queens	Klang, Selangor, Malaysia	Second Place
Chloe Chen	27	Beauty Queens	Kuala Lumpur, Malaysia	Second Place
Parul Shah	28	Beauty Queens	San Nicolas, Pangasinan, Philippines	Winners
Maggie Wilson	27	Beauty Queens	Bacolod, Negros Occidental, Philippines	Winners

== Results ==
The following teams are listed with their placements in each leg. Placements are listed in finishing order.

- A red placement with a dagger (†) indicates that the team was eliminated.
- A blue placement with a double-dagger (‡) indicates that the team was the last to arrive at a Pit Stop in a non-elimination leg, and had to perform a Speed Bump task in the following leg.
- A green ƒ indicates that the team won a Fast Forward.
- A brown > indicates that the team chose to use the Yield, and a brown < indicates the team who received it.
- A brown ⊃ indicates that the team chose to use the U-Turn, and a brown ⊂ indicates the team who received it.

Team placement (by leg)
Team	1	2	3	4	5	6	7	8	9	10
Parul & Maggie	7th	6th	5th	3rd	4th	3rd	4th	3rd	2nd> (Note: Parul & Maggie used the Yield against Treasuri & Louisa.)	1st
Yvonne & Chloe	9th	1st	3rd	5th	2nd	2nd	2nd	4th	3rd	2nd
Eric & Rona	4th	4th	6th	4th	3rd	4th	5th‡	2nd	1st⊃ (Note: Eric & Rona used the U-Turn against Treasuri & Louisa.)	3rd
Treasuri & Louisa	2nd	3rd	1st	1st	1st	5th	3rd	1st	4th†^{<}_{⊂}	
JK & Mike	3rd	8th	7th	7th	5th	1st	1st	5th†		
Anita & Tom	8th	2nd	4th	2nd	6th	6th†				
Will & Alex	5th	7th	2nd	6th	7th†					
Rach & Vicky	6th	5th	8th‡	8th†						
Alphaeus & Brandon	1st	9th†								
Rei & Keiji	10th†									
Lisa & Nicole	11th† (Note: Lisa & Nicole were eliminated at the Starting Line as per the provisions of the first task (see below).)									

== Race summary ==
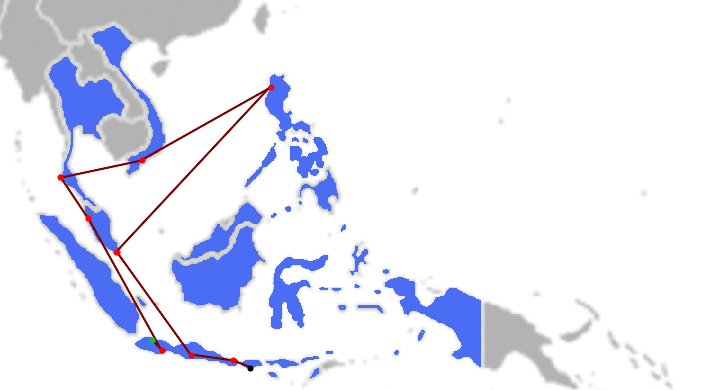
Route for The Amazing Race Asia 5.

Destinations	Air travel Rail travel Water travel Bus travel Helicopter travel Bicycle travel Gondola travel
Route Markers	Detour Roadblock Fast Forward Yield U-Turn Speed Bump Pit Stop

=== Leg 1 (Jakarta → West Java) ===
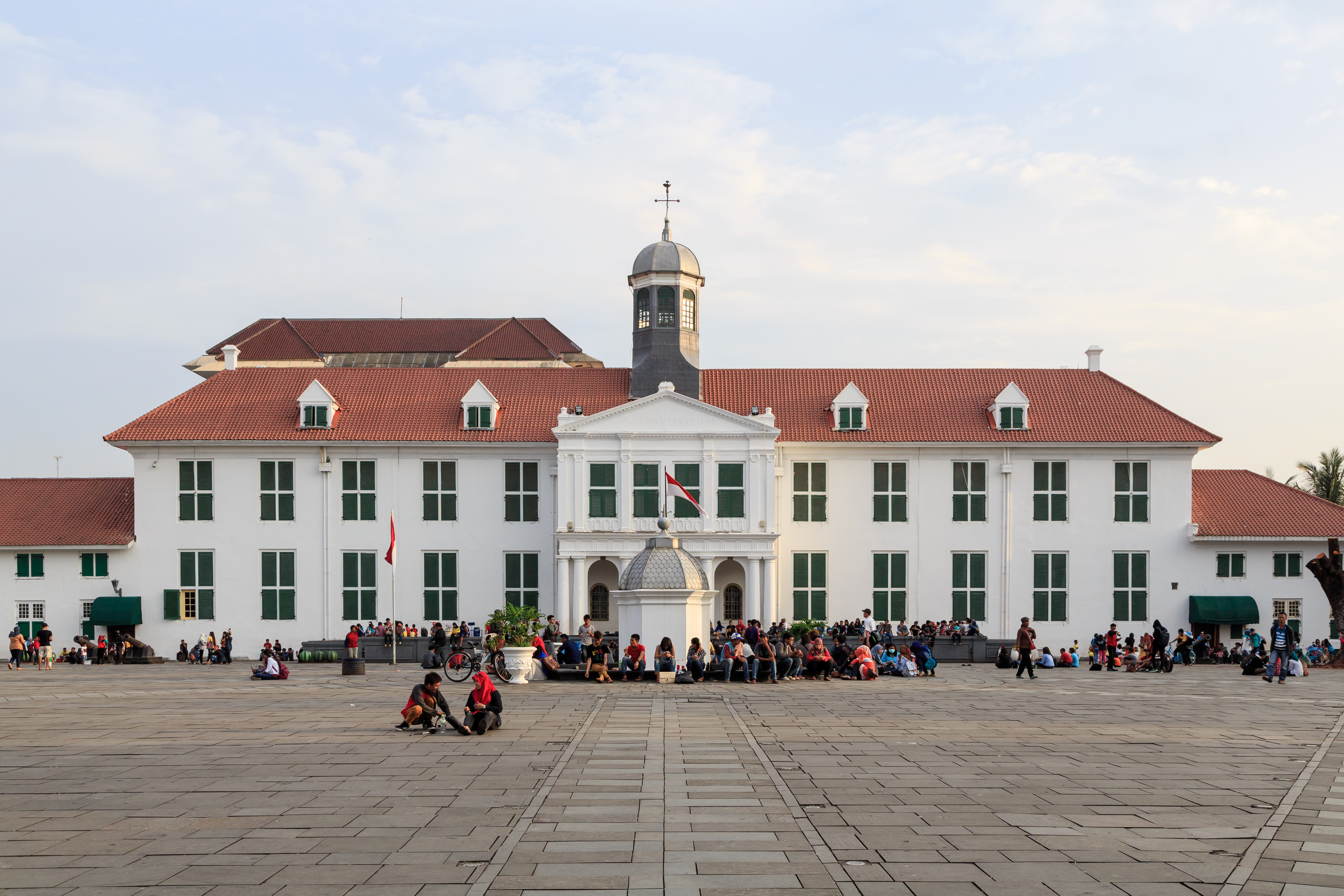
One of the first Detour choices in Jakarta required teams to fix an Onthel bicycle in Fatahillah Square overlooking Jakarta History Museum.

- Episode 1: "The Race is On!" (13 October 2016)
- Prize: Tickets to Bali, courtesy of Garuda Indonesia (awarded to Alphaeus & Brandon)
- Eliminated: Lisa & Nicole and Rei & Keiji

Locations

- Jakarta, Indonesia (Merdeka Square – National Monument) (Starting Line)
- Jakarta (Sapta Pesona Building) (Elimination Point)
- Jakarta (Museum Bahari – Syahbandar Tower (in Indonesian))
- Jakarta (Fatahillah Square or Port of Sunda Kelapa)
- Bogor, West Java (Kebun Raya Bogor)
- Bogor (Kebun Raya Bogor – Taman Teijsmann)
- Bogor (Kebun Raya Bogor – Lotus Pond)

Episode summary

- Teams set off at Merdeka Square overlooking the National Monument, and were instructed to travel by foot to Sapta Pesona Building. There, teams had to search through over 1,000 compasses for one of 10 compasses that pointed 210 degrees southwest and present it to Allan and Tara to receive their next clue. The last team without the correct compass was eliminated. This would direct them to Syahbandar Tower to grab their next clue.
- This season's first Detour was a choice between Fix or Freight. In Fix, teams traveled to Fatahillah Square, where they had to fix and assemble an Onthel bicycle's tire according to the example so that a child could ride it to receive their next clue. In Freight, teams traveled to the Port of Sunda Kelapa, where they had to fill a sack with sand in a traditional Indonesian pinisi and carry it to fill four barrels on the dock to receive their next clue.
- After the Detour, teams had to travel by taxi to Kebun Raya Bogor, where they had to search for a male Ondel-ondel dancer holding their next clue. Teams then had to bring the male Ondel-ondel dancer, from which they got their previous clue, to Taman Teijsmann to search for its female counterpart according to the pattern of the scarfs that the dancers wore. Once the dancers were correctly paired, the puppet master would give them their next clue. Teams would then bring the dancers to the nearby Pit Stop at the Lotus Pond.

=== Leg 2 (Jakarta → West Java) ===
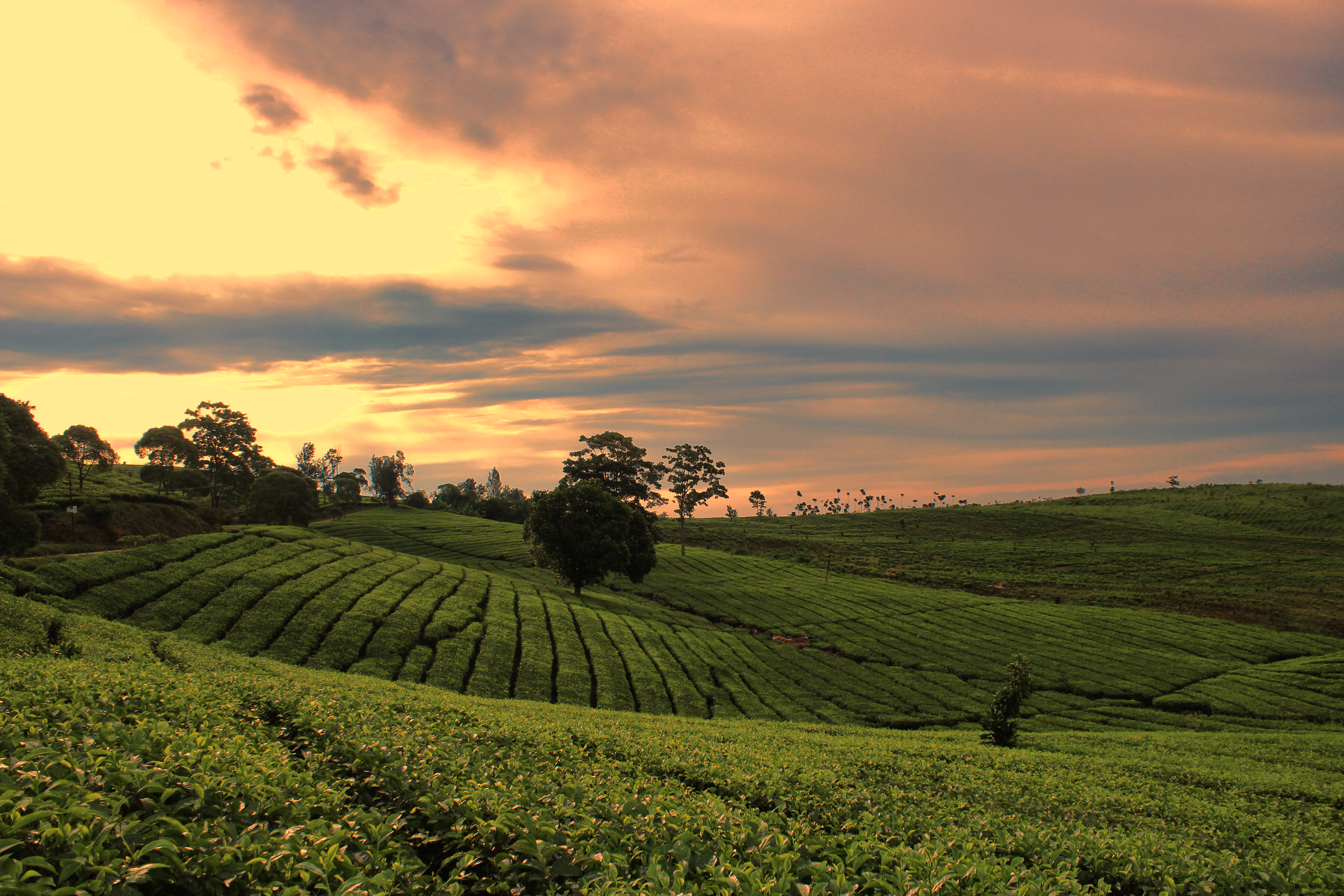
The Roadblock and Pit Stop for the second leg took place at the tea fields outside Bandung.

- Episode 2: "From Zero to Hero" (20 October 2016)
- Eliminated: Alphaeus & Brandon

Locations

- Jakarta (Pecenongan Street)
- Jakarta (Taman Mini Indonesia Indah)
- Bandung, West Java (Cikole National Park (in Indonesian))
- Subang (Ciater – Walini Tea Plantation (in Indonesian))

Episode summary

- At the start of the leg, teams were instructed to travel to Taman Mini Indonesia Indah where they had to ride on Grab bikes around the park to spot for seven marked letters (B, A, N, D, U, N, G). Once done, they had to make their way to the Tugu Api Pancasila monument and write down on a provided chalkboard the word BANDUNG which had to spell out their next destination, and their next clue, that would lead them to travel by taxi to Cikole National Park.
- This leg's Detour was a choice between Basket Bikes or Bandung Biathlon. In Basket Bikes, teams had to ride downhill along a five-kilometre (3.1 mi) bicycle trail and deliver two dozen sellable eggs in their baskets to the egg merchant to receive their next clue. However if any of the eggs broke along the way, teams would have to restart the entire task. In Bandung Biathlon, teams had to hit a set of targets with traditional bamboo guns while trekking uphill in a pair of traditional tandem land skis, known as bakiak, to receive their next clue.
- After the Detour, teams had to travel to Walini Tea Plantation to receive their next clue.
- In this season's first Roadblock, one team member had to comb a large section of a tea plantation to find a Wayang Golek, a traditional Indonesian puppet figurine, that they could exchange for their next clue, directing them to the Pit Stop nearby.

=== Leg 3 (West Java → Jakarta → Malaysia) ===
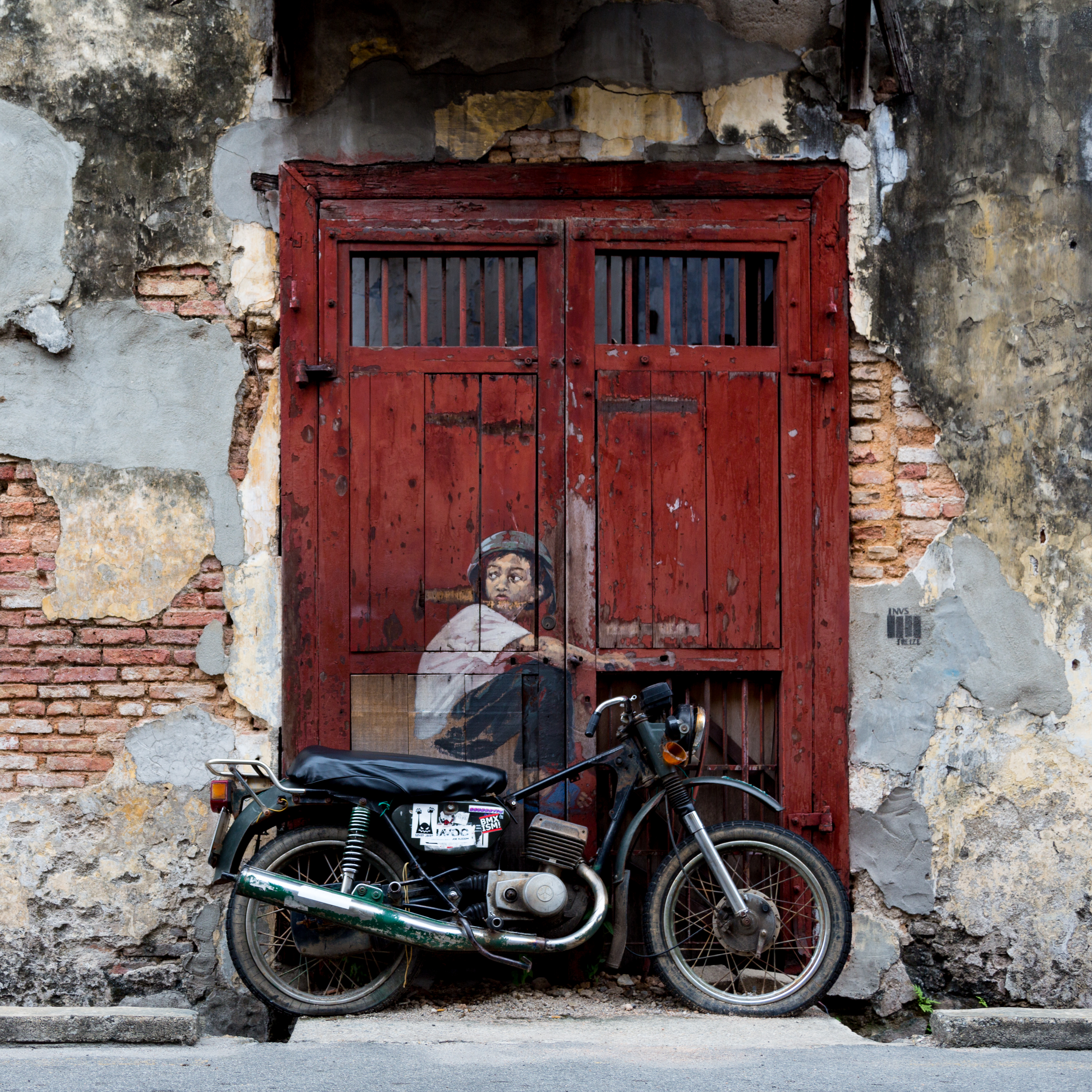
One of the Detour choices in George Town, Penang had teams photograph street murals around Armenian Street.

- Episode 3: "The Value of Insurance" (27 October 2016)

Locations

- Bandung (Merdeka Street)
- Jakarta (Senayan City)
- Jakarta (Soekarno–Hatta International Airport) → Kuala Lumpur, Malaysia (Kuala Lumpur International Airport)
- Kuala Lumpur (Great Eastern Tower)
- Kuala Lumpur (Kuala Lumpur Sentral Railway Station) → Butterworth (Butterworth Railway Station)
- George Town (Waterfall Hill Temple)
- George Town (Chew Clan Jetty)
- George Town (Armenian Street or Han Jiang Ancestral Temple)
- George Town (Hean Boo Thean Kuan Yin Temple)

Episode summary

- At the start of this leg, teams had to travel to the Garuda Indonesia head office at Senayan City in Jakarta and purchase airline tickets to Kuala Lumpur, Malaysia. Once there, teams had to travel to Great Eastern Tower, where they would get their next clue.
- In this leg's Roadblock, one team member had to rappel down the 300-foot (91 m) tower, grab a flag attached to the building, and exchange it with Great Eastern Life CEO Dato Koh Yaw Hui for their next clue. If racers missed the flag or dropped it, they had to attempt the challenge again.
- After the Roadblock, teams had to take a train to Penang and then a taxi to Waterfall Hill Temple. Once it opened the next day, teams had to climb 500 steps to the summit of the temple to receive their next clue from the holy man, directing them to search the Clan Jetties for their next clue. They would discover that the clue box was located at the Chew Clan Jetty.
- This leg's Detour was a choice between Street Art or Street Play. In Street Art, teams had to pedal a beca and find five street murals around Armenian Street matching provided pictures. Then, teams had to convince locals to take a specified-posed picture with them at each of the murals to receive their next clue. In Street Play, teams traveled to Han Jiang Ancestral Temple. Once there, they had to learn to perform a two-minute Chinese opera fight routine and perform it with a musical accompaniment to the satisfaction of the judge to receive their next clue.
- After the Detour, teams had to check in at the Pit Stop: Hean Boo Thean Kuan Yin Temple.

Additional notes

- Zabrina & Joe Jer, the winners of the inaugural season, appeared as Pit Stop greeters in their home country of Malaysia.
- This was a non-elimination leg.

=== Leg 4 (Malaysia → Thailand) ===
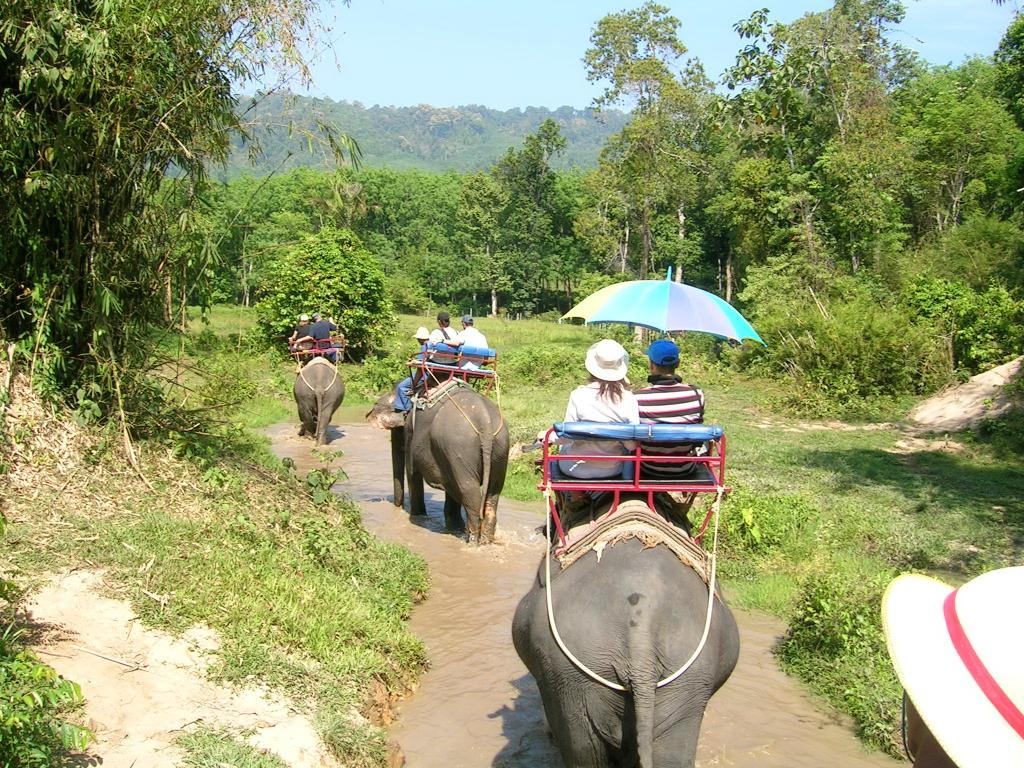
While in Thailand, teams experienced riding an elephant in Phang Nga Province.

- Episode 4: "The Pain Does Not Exist" (3 November 2016)
- Eliminated: Rach & Vicky

Locations

- George Town (Hean Boo Thean Kuan Yin Temple)
- George Town (Penang International Airport) → Phuket, Thailand (Phuket International Airport)
- Mueang Phang Nga (Phang Nga Elephant Park)
- Mueang Phang Nga (Phung Chang Cave)
- Thalang (Sarasin Bridge)
- Thalang (Wat Tha Chat Chai)
- Thalang (Wat Mai Khao)
- Thalang (Lay Pang Beach)

Episode summary

- At the start of the leg, teams were instructed to fly to Phuket, Thailand. Once there, they had to travel to Phang Nga Elephant Park where they had to collect pineapple leaves to feed the elephants. Once they had gathered enough pineapple leaves, they had to go through a marked path and bring an elephant from the river by riding on the elephant to the feeding area. Once they had fed the elephants, they would receive their next clue, directing them to proceed to Sarasin Bridge for their next clue.
- For their Speed Bump, Rach & Vicky had to enter the Phung Chang Cave, where they had to find an elephant statuette hidden inside the cave and return it before they could continue racing.
- The leg's Detour was a choice between Muay Thai or Un-Tie. For both Detour choices, teams traveled to Wat Tha Chat Chai, overlooking the Sarasin Bridge. In Muay Thai, teams had to learn a traditional Wai Kru ritual and perform it to the satisfaction of a Muay Thai master to receive their next clue. In Un-Tie, teams had to first untie the knots on a rope. Then, by using a pontoon raft, teams had to cross the water from the shoreline to the floating village nearby by pulling themselves along an aerial rope course to retrieve their clue before they could return to the shoreline.
- After the Detour, teams had to travel to Wat Mai Khao in order to receive their next clue.
- In this leg's Roadblock, one team member had to remain still for 15 minutes while balancing a stack of coins on their backhands and head to receive their next clue; otherwise, they had to start the task again.
- After the Roadblock, teams had to travel to Lay Pang Beach, where they had to find their next clue at the coconut stand. After getting their clue at the coconut stand, teams were instructed to bring two coconuts down the beach to the nearby Pit Stop.

Additional note

- There was an unused Yield this leg that was not aired.

=== Leg 5 (Thailand → Vietnam) ===
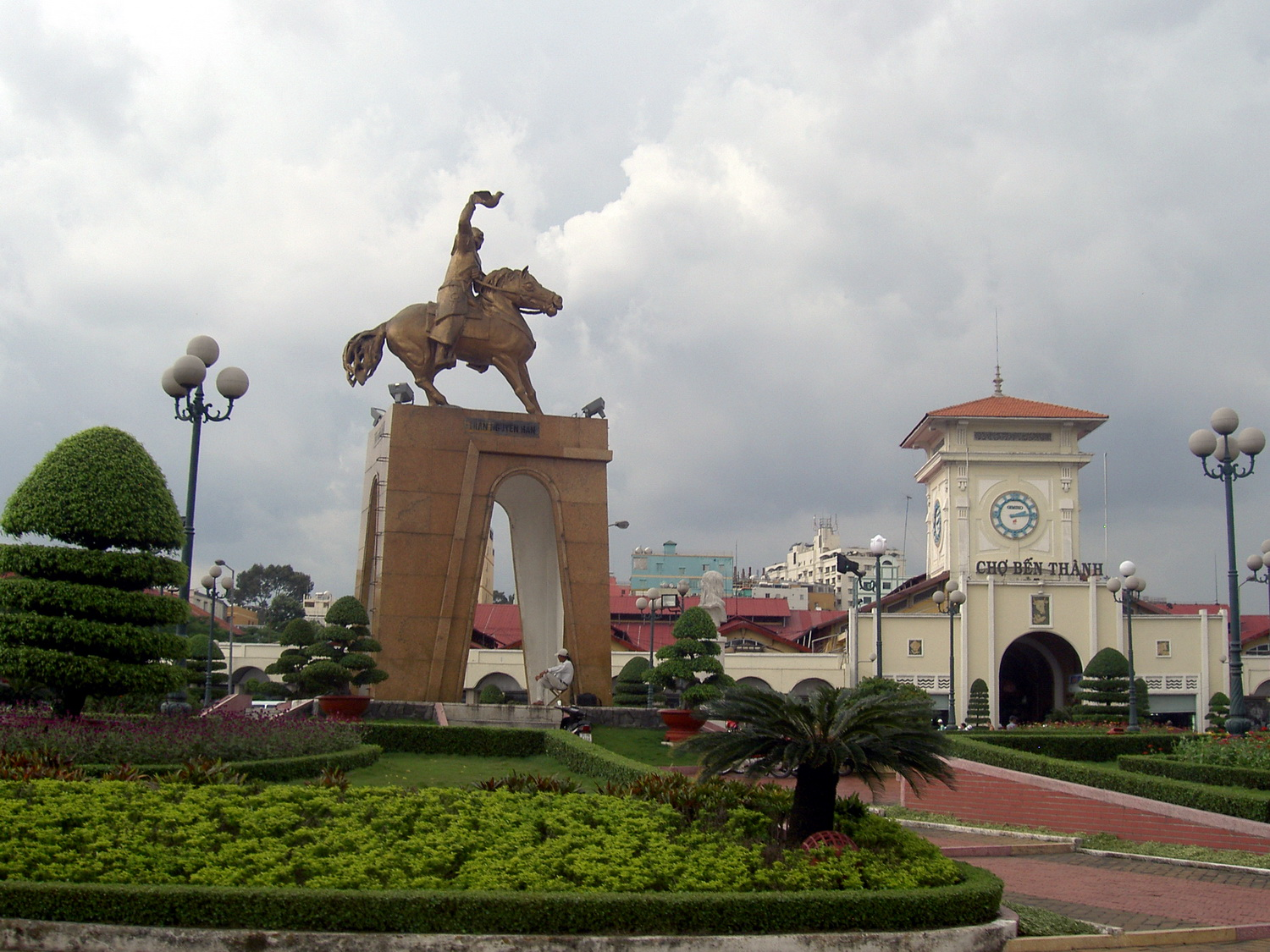
Teams ended this leg at the Quách Thị Trang roundabout overlooking the famous landmark of Ho Chi Minh City, Chợ Bến Thành.

- Episode 5: "Taste Like Chicken" (10 November 2016)
- Prize: Tickets to anywhere, courtesy of Garuda Indonesia (awarded to Treasuri & Louisa)
- Eliminated: Will & Alex

Locations

- Sirinat National Park (Nai Yang Beach Resort)
- Phuket (Phuket International Airport) → Ho Chi Minh City, Vietnam (Tan Son Nhat International Airport)
- Ho Chi Minh City (Hồ Câu Tôm Giải Trí Thanh Đa)
  - Ho Chi Minh City (Bình Quới Tourist Village)
- Ho Chi Minh City (Đường Nguyễn Văn Cừ – Photocopy Ngọc Yến)
- Ho Chi Minh City (Tao Đàn Park or Hồ Thị Kỷ Flower Market)
- Ho Chi Minh City (Quán Bụi Restaurant)
- Ho Chi Minh City (Quách Thị Trang Square overlooking Bến Thành Market)

Episode summary

- At the start of this leg, teams were instructed to fly to Ho Chi Minh City, Vietnam. Once there, they had to travel by taxi to Hồ Câu Tôm Giải Trí Thanh Đa in order to get their next clue.
- This season's only Fast Forward told teams to go to Bình Quới Tourist Village in Bình Thạnh District and eat rice inside clay pots in an attempt to find a Vietnamese gold coin in one of the rice patties. For every clay pot they selected, they had to break the clay pot and eat the contents before making another choice. However, none of the teams claimed the Fast Forward after failing to find the coin.
- Teams who did not choose the Fast Forward had to catch four prawns from the prawns’ pool inside the restaurant to receive their next clue, directing them to travel by taxi to Đường Nguyễn Văn Cừ, where they had to search for Mr. Ngọc at the Photocopy Ngọc Yến, where he would photocopy and stamp their next clue.
- This leg's Detour was a choice between Badminton Bash or Flower Power. In Badminton Bash, teams travelled to Tao Đàn Park, where they had to play badminton. If teams could score 10 points before their opponent scored 21 points, they would receive their next clue. In Flower Power, teams travelled to Hồ Thị Kỷ Flower Market. Then, they had to carry two empty baskets and find some flower stalls inside the flower market to gather some flowers. After they gathered all the flowers, they had to deliver the flowers to the flower retailer, H2 Flower Shop, to receive their next clue.
- After the Detour, teams had to travel by taxi to Quán Bụi Restaurant in order to find their next clue.
- In this leg's Roadblock, one team member had to eat five courses of Vietnamese exotic delicacies (rats, bats, centipedes, scorpions, and lizards) to receive their next clue.
- After the Roadblock, teams had to travel to the Pit Stop: Quách Thị Trang Square overlooking Bến Thành Market.

=== Leg 6 (Vietnam → Philippines) ===
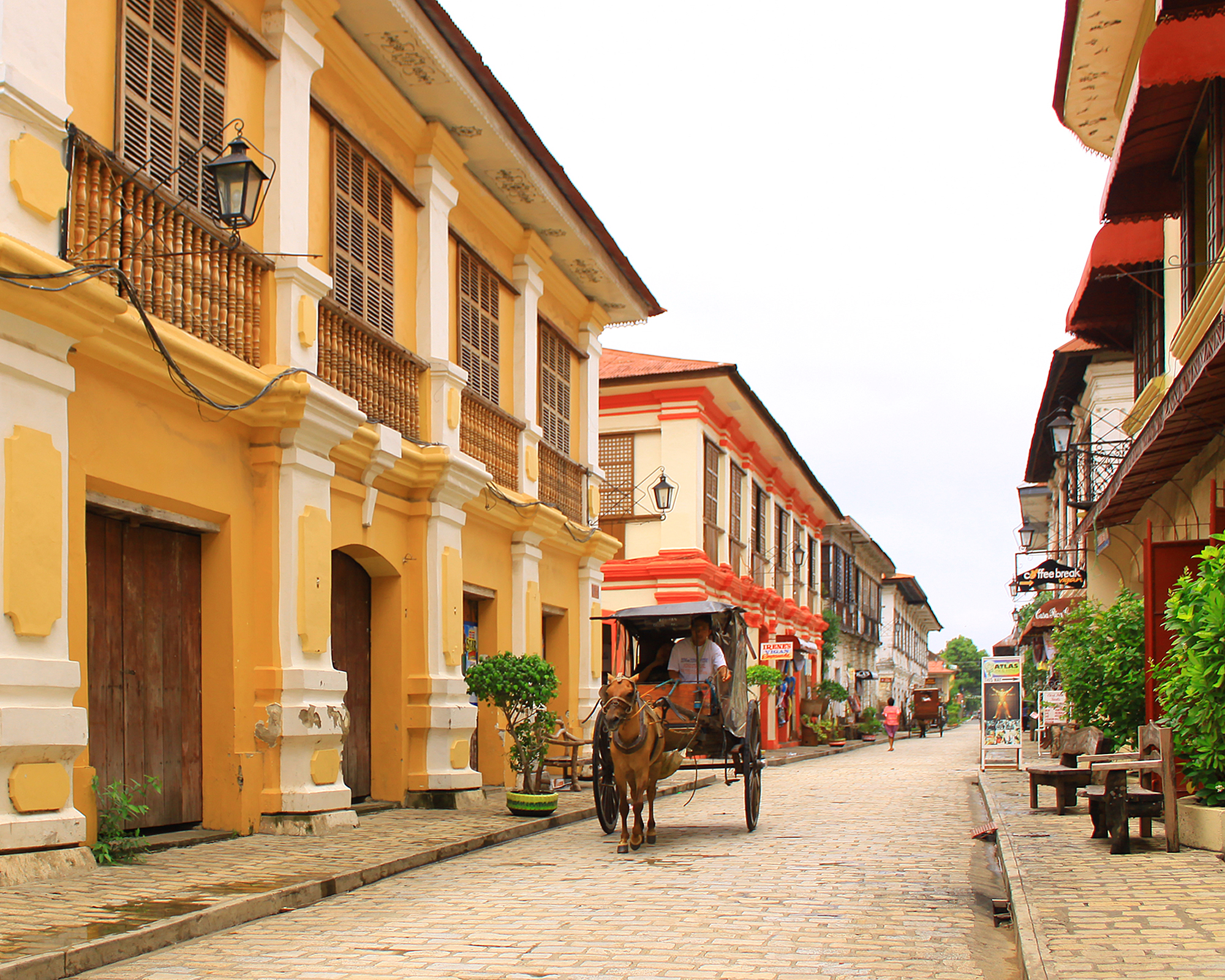
While in the Philippines, teams visited the old city of Vigan, one of the world’s New 7 Wonders Cities.

- Episode 6: "Made With Love" (17 November 2016)
- Eliminated: Anita & Tom

Locations

- Ho Chi Minh City (Quách Thị Trang Square)
- Ho Chi Minh City (Tan Son Nhat International Airport) → Manila, Philippines (Ninoy Aquino International Airport)
- Pasay (Ninoy Aquino International Airport Terminal 2 – Grab Taxi Station)
- Manila (Quiapo Market)
- Pasay (Philippine Red Cross Pasay Chapter)
- Quezon City (Partas Bus Terminal) → Vigan (Partas Bus Terminal)
- Santa (Ilocos Sur Adventure Zone) (Overnight Rest)
- Vigan (Calle Crisologo – M.A. Parel Antique Shop)
- Vigan (Old Town Vigan and Plaza Burgos)
- Vigan (Plaza Salcedo)
- Bantay (Bantay Bell Tower)

Episode summary

- At the start of the leg, teams were instructed to fly to Manila, Philippines. Once there, they had to take a Grab booth and hire a taxi to travel to Quiapo Market. Once at the market, teams had to navigate through the busy streets to buy items needed for a disaster preparedness kit which includes rice, sugar, a first aid kit, and an umbrella. After getting the essential items, they had to travel to the Philippine Red Cross Pasay Chapter to exchange their items for their next clue.
- Teams must travel by bus to Vigan and make their way on a tricycle to Ilocos Sur Adventure Zone in Santa where they would find their next clue.
- In this leg's Roadblock, one team member had to ride a face-first zip line across the Abra River to throw a flour bomb and hit a floating target underneath to receive their next clue.
- After the Roadblock, teams had to take a tricycle to M.A. Parel Antique Shop in Calle Crisologo where they would get their next clue.
- This leg's Detour was a choice between Longganisa Kalesa or Carabao Karaoke. In Longganisa Kalesa, teams had to stuff 15 traditional sausages, known as longganisa, while riding a kalesa, a traditional Filipino horse-drawn calash, and buggy through the ancient cobblestone streets towards Plaza Burgos. Once all the sausages were properly made and met the satisfaction of the judges, teams would receive their next clue. In Carabao Karaoke, teams had to learn the Ilocano version of the children's song "Six Little Ducks" while traveling on a carabao cart until they reached Plaza Burgos. At the plaza, teams had to perform in front of the crowd to the judge's satisfaction to receive their next clue.
- After the Detour, teams had to take a tricycle to Plaza Salcedo in order to receive their next clue, directing them to the Pit Stop: Bantay Bell Tower.

Additional note

- There was a U-Turn in this leg was not used by any team.

=== Leg 7 (Philippines → Singapore) ===
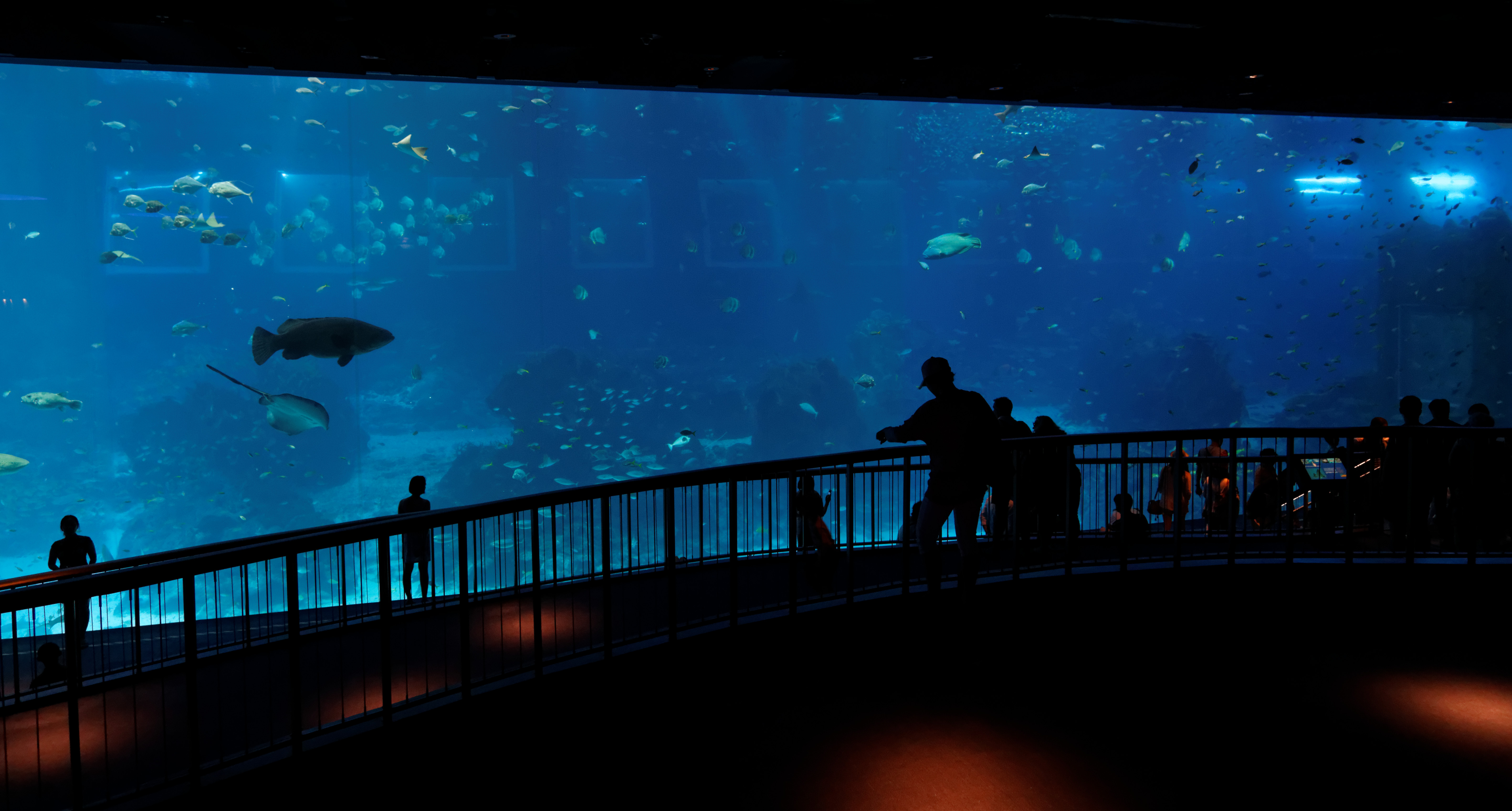
The Roadblock in Singapore had racers dive inside the S.E.A. Aquarium's Open Ocean tank in Resorts World Sentosa, the largest oceanarium in the world.

- Episode 7: "By Air, Land and Sea" (24 November 2016)
- Prize: Access to Premium Lounge, courtesy of Garuda Indonesia (awarded to JK & Mike)

Locations

- Bantay (Bantay Bell Tower)
- Bantay (Bantay Church) → Laoag (Laoag International Airport)
- Laoag (Laoag International Airport) → Singapore (Changi Airport)
- Singapore (Sentosa – Resorts World Sentosa (S.E.A. Aquarium))
- Singapore (Gardens by the Bay East – Skyline Promenade)
- Singapore (OUE Bayfront Rooftop)
- Singapore (Singapore Turf Club)
- Singapore (Marina Bay – Moving Boat)

Episode summary

- At the start of the leg, teams had to take a minibus to Laoag and were instructed to fly to Singapore. Once there, they had to travel to Resorts World Sentosa, where they had to enter from the casino drop-off point to get to the S.E.A. Aquarium in order to get their next clue.
- In this leg's Roadblock, one team member had to change into a diving suit and dive into the Open Ocean habitat tank, where they had to find a treasure chest. They would show a flash card of fish name inside the chest to their teammate outside the tank who had to search through several photos of fish and match one of the photos with the name of the fish taken from the chest to receive their next clue.
- After the Roadblock, teams had to take a Grab car to Gardens by the Bay and search from Skyline Promenade using a pair of binoculars for an Amazing Race flag on the skyline. Once they had spotted the flag, they had to identify and head to the location, the rooftop of OUE Bayfront, to get their next clue.
- This leg's Detour was a choice between Skate Rat or Drone Hat. In Skate Rat, one team member had to skate on an electric skateboard and complete a slalom course while carrying two trays of stacked cans without falling down or disturbing the balance of the stacked cans to receive their next clue. In Drone Hat, one team member had to pilot a remote controlled drone helicopter and land it on a helipad placed on a helmet worn by their teammate to receive their next clue.
- After the Detour, teams had to travel to the Pit Stop location either at Esplanade Jetty, Merlion Park Jetty or Marina Bayfront South Jetty, and board a moving boat that would land at these three locations.

Additional note

- This was a non-elimination leg.

=== Leg 8 (Singapore → Yogyakarta) ===
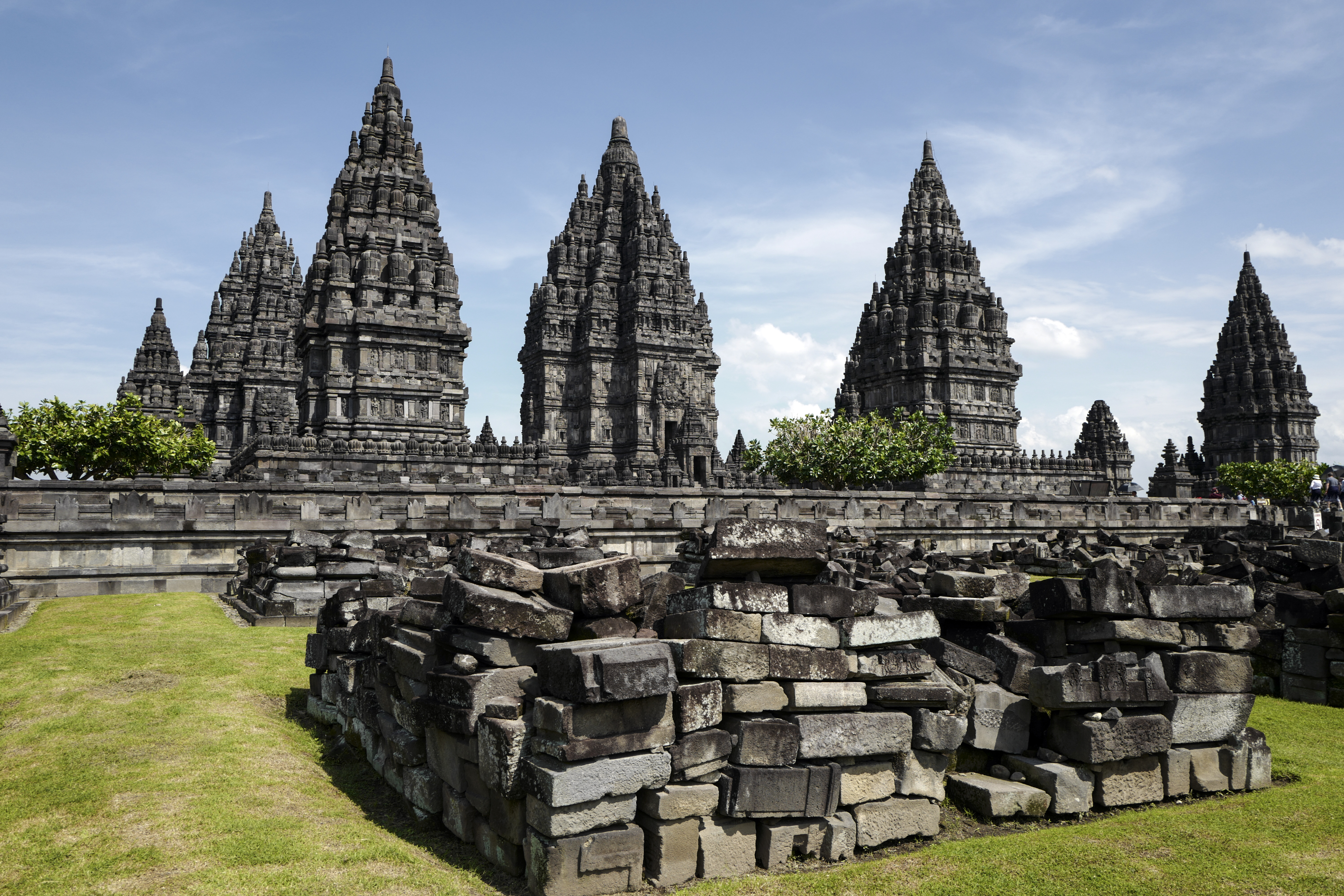
Prambanan, the largest Hindu temple in Indonesia, was the site of one of this leg's Roadblocks while teams visited Yogyakarta.

- Episode 8: "Should Have Turned Left" (1 December 2016)
- Eliminated: JK & Mike

Locations

- Singapore (Robertson Quay – Grand Copthorne Waterfront)
- Singapore (Changi Airport) → Yogyakarta, Indonesia (Adisutjipto International Airport)
- Semanu (Goa Jomblang (in Indonesian))
- Sleman (Pasar Kalasan (in Indonesian))
- Sleman (Prambanan Temple – South Side)
- Yogyakarta (Alun-Alun Selatan)
- Yogyakarta (nDalem Ngabean)

Episode summary

- At the start of the leg, teams were instructed to fly to Yogyakarta. Once there, they had to travel by taxi to Goa Jomblang in order to get their next clue.
- In this leg's first Roadblock, one team member had to tightrope walk 160 feet (49 m) above the opening of Goa Jomblang. Then, in the middle of the tightrope, they had to climb down a rope ladder to retrieve their clue beneath them. Once they had retrieved their clue, they had to ascend back and return to their partner before they could continue racing. Should the team member drop the clue or fall off from the tightrope, they had to wait for their turn before they could attempt the task again.
- For their Speed Bump, Eric & Rona would be blindfolded and had to drink a cup of traditional Indonesian herbal concoction, known as jamu. After removing their blindfolds, they had to search among several bottles for one that held the same herbal concoction that they drank before they could continue racing.
- After the first Roadblock, teams had to travel by taxi to Prambanan Temple and search the South Side in order to find their next clue.
- In this leg's second Roadblock, one team member, regardless of who performed the previous Roadblock, had to walk around the holiest inner zone of the temple compound while memorizing the names and locations of the Hindu deities inside the temple. Then, they would be given the map of the temple compound and had to correctly label all the locations of the Hindu deities by their names to receive their next clue.
- After the second Roadblock, teams participated in the traditional Yogyakarta archery of Jemparingan Mataraman, whereby each team member had to hit a bull’s eye target with an arrow while sitting down to receive their next clue, which directed them by taxi to Alun-alun Selatan, where they had to find their next clue attached in one of the cycling cars, known as an odong-odong. Then, teams had to convince two locals to join them to take a ride on the odong-odong around the town square to receive their next clue. Then, they would have to ride again on the odong-odong to nDalem Ngabean in order to reach the Pit Stop.

Additional note

- There was an unused Yield this leg that was not aired.

=== Leg 9 (Yogyakarta → East Java) ===
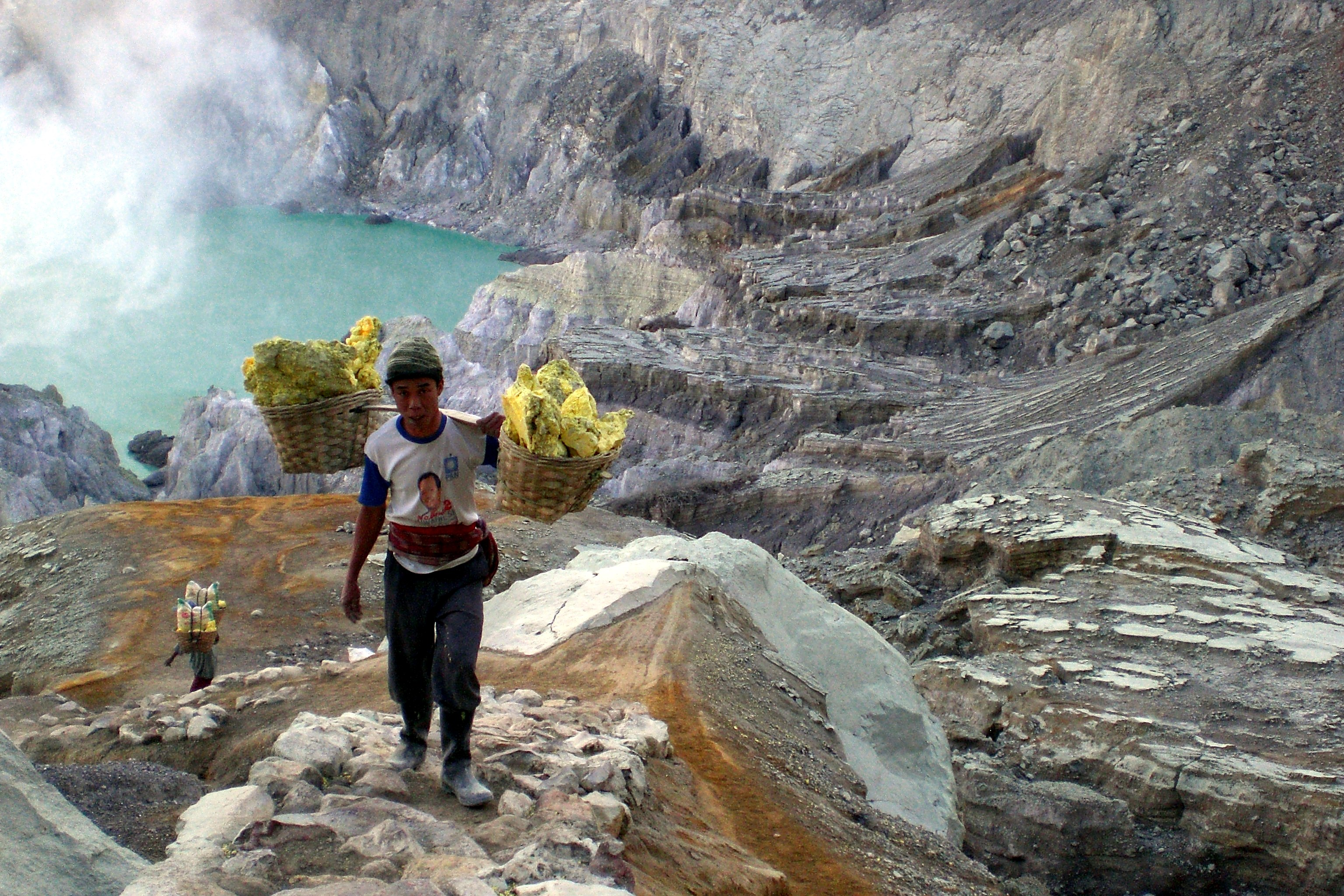
While in Banyuwangi, teams visited Ijen Volcano for a Roadblock involving its traditional sulfur mining industry.

- Episode 9: "No More Mr. Nice Guy!" (8 December 2016)
- Eliminated: Treasuri & Louisa

Locations

- Yogyakarta (nDalem Ngabean)
- Yogyakarta (Lempuyangan Railway Station) → Banyuwangi, East Java (Karangasem Railway Station (in Indonesian))
- Banyuwangi (Kemiren – Sanggar Genjah Arum (in Indonesian)) (Overnight Rest)
- Banyuwangi (Licin – Ijen Volcano)
- Banyuwangi (SDN 2 Kemiren)
- Banyuwangi (Kalibendo Coffee Factory)
- Banyuwangi (Kalibendo Coffee Plantation – Pendopo Ramean)

Episode summary

- At the start of the leg, teams were instructed to travel by train to Banyuwangi. Once there, they had to travel to Sanggar Genjah Arum in Kemiren, where they had to sign up for one of four departure times to enter the coffee shop the following morning. At the designated time, the teams would enter the coffee shop where the shop's owner, Mr. Setiawan Subekti, would serve them Banyuwangi's popular coffee of Kopai Osing and would also give them their next clue, directing them to travel by taxi to Ijen Volcano.
- In this leg's Roadblock, one team member had to take part in the labour-intensive sulfur mining operation, where they had to collect and carry sulfur slabs using two baskets on a pole to the crushing area. Then, they had to crush the slabs into smaller blocks, pack them inside sacks, and carry them to the weighing area. Once they had collected 80 kilograms (180 lb) of sulfur, they would receive their next clue.
- After the Roadblock, teams had to travel by taxi to SDN 2 Kerimen in order to get their next clue.
- This season's final Detour was a choice between Dragon Horse or Human Bull. In Dragon Horse, teams had to participate in a traditional art of Jaran Kencak, where they had to fully decorate and dress up a horse typically used in a wedding ceremony procession. Once approved by the judge, they would go to the procession and ride on a horse-drawn carriage before receiving their next clue from a newlywed couple. In Human Bull, teams had to transfer a handful of rice husk across the paddy field to an empty basket on the other side. However, they had to avoid the kebo-keboan, a human dressed up as a bull, that would block their way to the basket. Once the basket was full, teams would receive their next clue.
- After the Detour, teams had to travel to Kalibendo Coffee Factory, where they had to empty an 80-kilogram (180 lb) bag of coffee beans before searching for seven red-colored coffee beans with letters of P-I-T-S-T-O-P among the coffee beans to receive their next clue, which had to direct to the Pit Stop nearby.

Additional notes

- Parul & Maggie chose to use the Yield on Treasuri & Louisa.
- Eric & Rona chose to use the U-Turn on Treasuri & Louisa.

=== Leg 10 (East Java → Bali) ===
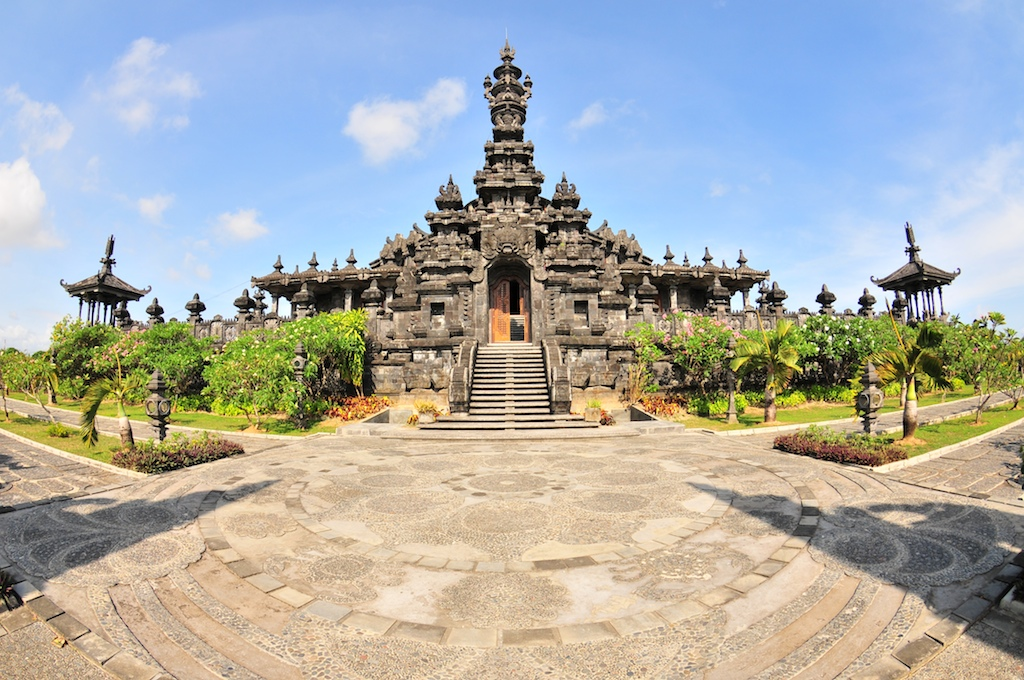
Bajra Sandhi Monument in the heart on the island of Bali served as the Finish Line of the 5th season of The Amazing Race Asia.

- Episode 10: "One Hell of a Race Day" (15 December 2016)
- Prize: US$100,000
- Winners: Parul & Maggie
- Runners-up: Yvonne & Chloe
- Third place: Eric & Rona

Locations

- Banyuwangi (Kalibendo Coffee Factory)
- Banyuwangi (Port of Ketapang) → Jembrana, Bali (Gilimanuk Harbor (in Indonesian))
- Denpasar (Pura Dalem Pengembak)
- Denpasar (Pantai Mertasari)
- Denpasar (Taman Inspirasi)
- Gianyar (Pura Samuan Tiga)
- Denpasar (Bajra Sandhi Monument)

Episode summary

- At the start of the leg, teams were instructed to travel by boat to the island of Bali. Once there, they had to travel by taxi to Pura Dalem Pengembak where they had to assemble two Balinese long ornamental poles, known as penjor. Once the penjor artist was satisfied, they had to deliver them to a penjor display area at Pantai Mertasari to receive their next clue, directing them to Taman Inspirasi where they would find their next clue.
- At Taman Inspirasi, teams participated in a traditional Indonesian pole climb, known as panjat pinang, whereby each team member had to climb a Pinang palm tree pole to retrieve a marked item at the top of the pole to receive their next clue, where they had to change into their swimsuits and assemble a traditional fishing boat called jukung according to the finished sample. Once done, they had to paddle the boat to search through several traditional lobster traps for a marked one and return it to a fisherman at the shore to receive their next clue.
- The clue instructed teams to travel by taxi to Pura Samuan Tiga in order to get their next clue.
- In this season's final Roadblock, one team member had to arrange coconuts with symbols of objects and places they encountered throughout the season (as well as misleading names and symbols), the name of the Pit Stop, and the team eliminated in each leg during the season on a board of a life-sized traditional mancala game of congkak in the corresponding spaces on the congkak according to the legs visited. Once the coconuts were placed in the correct spots, teams were given their final clue, which instructed them to travel by taxi to the Finish Line: Bajra Sandhi Monument.

Leg	Objects or Places Encountered	Pit Stop	Team(s) Eliminated
1	Compass	Bogor	Lisa & Nicole; Rei & Keiji
2	Wayang Golek puppet	Ciater (in Indonesian)	Alphaeus & Brandon
3	Waterfall Hill Temple	Hean Boo Thean	Non Elimination
4	Coconut	Lay Pang	Rach & Vicky
5	Scorpion	Chợ Bến Thành	Will & Alex
6	Bull's eye target	Bantay	Anita & Tom
7	Stingray	Marina Bay	Non Elimination
8	Rope ladder	nDalem Ngabean	JK & Mike
9	Volcano	Pendopo Ramean	Treasuri & Louisa

== Reception ==
The premiere episode was the best performing English Original Production (OP) in Singapore, Malaysia, and the Philippines in 2016. It also posted 26% and 33% increases in Singapore and Malaysia, respectively, over 2015's record-breaking Asia's Got Talent, putting the series on track to become the most watched English OP ever in Asia.
