= The Amazing Race Asia 1 =

Season of television series

- Season 1
- The Amazing Race Asia logo for season 1
- Presented by: Allan Wu
- No. of teams: 10
- Winners: Zabrina Fernandez & Joe Jer Tee
- No. of legs: 12
- Distance traveled: 39,000 km (24,000 mi)
- No. of episodes: 13 (14 including recap)

Release
- Original network: AXN Asia
- Original release: 9 November 2006 – 1 February 2007

Additional information
- Filming dates: 24 May – 17 June 2006

Series chronology
- Next → Season 2

The Amazing Race Asia 1 is the first season of The Amazing Race Asia, an Asian reality competition show based on the American series The Amazing Race. Hosted by Allan Wu, it featured ten teams of two, each with a pre-existing relationship, in a race around Asia and the Pacific Rim to win US$100,000. This season visited two continents and eight countries and travelled over 39,000 kilometres (24,000 mi) during twelve legs. Starting in Kuala Lumpur, teams travelled through Malaysia, Indonesia, Australia, New Zealand, Singapore, Thailand, India, the United Arab Emirates, before returning to Malaysia and finished in Kuching. Applications were accepted through 31 March 2006. The season began on 9 November 2006 on AXN Asia and the season finale aired on 1 February 2007.

Malaysian workers Zabrina Fernandez and Joe Jer Tee were the winners of this season becoming the first all-female team to win in the history of the Amazing Race franchise and were also the first winners to win only the final leg, while Hong Kong dating expats Sandy Sydney and Francesca Von Etzdorf finished in second place and Malaysian dating couple Andrew Tan and Syeon Park finished in third place.

== Production ==
=== Development and filming ===
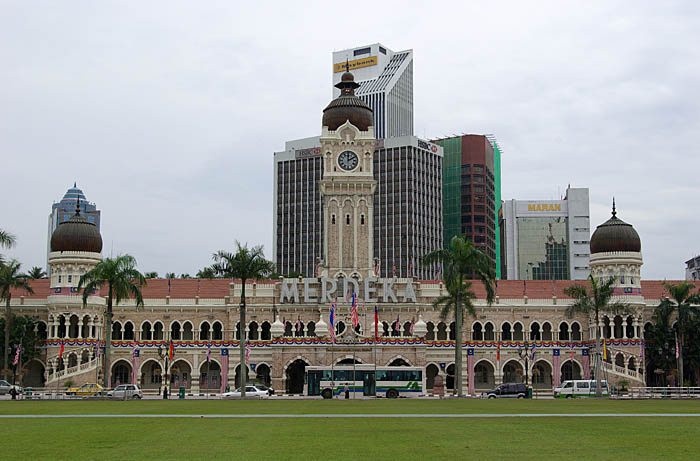
Merdeka Square overlooking Sultan Abdul Samad Building in Kuala Lumpur was the Starting Line of the first season of The Amazing Race Asia.

In October 2005, Buena Vista International Television-Asia Pacific and Sony Pictures Television International's AXN Asia announced that it had earned the right to produce the first localized production of The Amazing Race. AXN Asia, which airs the original American series, had received many written requests for an Asian production from local viewers.

The season visited two continents and eight countries over a distance of more than 39,000 kilometres (24,000 miles), including the first time visit for an Amazing Race franchise to Indonesia, which had not been visited in the original version at the time of air (the nation would later be visited in the 19th season, in 2011).

=== Marketing ===
The first season of the show was supported by the following regional sponsors: Sony Electronics Asia Pacific Pte. Ltd, AirAsia, Caltex, MSN, Nokia, and Bintan Lagoon Resort. Ford was a local sponsor, while the series was also supported by Tourism Malaysia. The sponsors played a major role in the series by providing prizes and integrating their products into various tasks. In addition, AirAsia was the sole airline used by racers, while Bintan Lagoon Resort was the sequester location for eliminated teams.

To introduce the new series to an Asian audience, a promotional tour visited Seoul, Bangkok, Singapore, Kuala Lumpur, Manila, and Delhi prior to the series premiere.

=== Casting ===
In July 2006, Singaporean television personality Allan Wu was introduced as the host of The Amazing Race Asia. Ricky Ow, General Manager of SPE Networks Asia described Wu as "a big fan of The Amazing Race" and felt that "his good looks and natural charisma will offer a different appeal from the US version."

Over 1000 teams across Asia applied for the series, with registration accepted through 31 March 2006. Ultimately, ten teams were selected to participate in the race; the cast included expatriates in Thailand and Hong Kong and Indian models. Host Allan Wu commented that "the producers definitely took the time and did their homework to select the most diverse, entertaining, and controversial batch of contestants for our first season".

=== Broadcasting ===
An additional episode, subtitled "Memories" was a post-show interview special that aired one week after the season finale.

== Cast ==
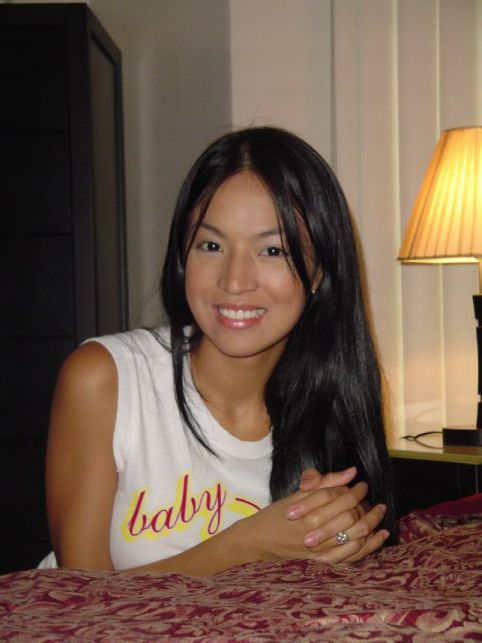
Aubrey Sandel

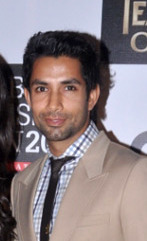
Sahil Shroff

The cast consisted of a few local media representatives or their relatives. Zabrina Fernandez is a Ntv7 and Channel V television producer, as well as the sister of Malaysian film director Joshua Fernandez and Hitz.FM DJ JJ Fernandez. Aubrey Miles is a filipina actress who acted in local movies such as Prosti, Xerex, Sanib, A Beautiful Life and Gagamboy; she is also the co-host of noontime show Masayang Tanghali Bayan. Sahil Shroff is an Indian model. Prashant Raj Sachdev is an Indian actor who starred in the Bollywood movie Aag; he was also the runner-up of Mr. India 2004. Melody is a Singaporean TV and movie actress, having starred in local movies such as Street Angels and The Teenage Textbook Movie; she also played a supporting character in long-running drama Love Blossoms and its sequel, Love Blossoms II.

This season consists of five non-Asians; Andy, Francesca, Howard and Laura are from the United Kingdom, having separate representatives in Asian countries (as Andy & Laura representing Thailand), and Sandy is from New Zealand, is representing Hong Kong.

Contestants	Age	Relationship	Hometown	Status
Ernie Lopez	42	Married	Manila, Philippines	Eliminated 1st (in Jakarta, Indonesia)
Jeena Lopez	35	Married	Manila, Philippines	Eliminated 1st (in Jakarta, Indonesia)
Jacqueline Yu	23	Actress & Model	Manila, Philippines	Eliminated 2nd (in Tabanan, Indonesia)
Aubrey Miles	26	Actress & Model	Manila, Philippines	Eliminated 2nd (in Tabanan, Indonesia)
Sahil Shroff	26	Models	Mumbai, India	Eliminated 3rd (in Auckland, New Zealand)
Prashant Sachdev	26	Models	Mumbai, India	Eliminated 3rd (in Auckland, New Zealand)
Melody Chen	28	Best Friends	Singapore	Eliminated 4th (in Gibbston Valley, New Zealand)
Sharon Wong	31	Best Friends	Singapore	Eliminated 4th (in Gibbston Valley, New Zealand)
Howard Bicknell	40	Best Friends	Colombo, Sri Lanka	Eliminated 5th (in Than Bok Khorani National Park, Thailand)
Sahran Abeysundara	32	Best Friends	Colombo, Sri Lanka	Eliminated 5th (in Than Bok Khorani National Park, Thailand)
Andy Lawson	29	Engaged	Koh Samui, Thailand	Eliminated 6th (in Delhi, India)
Laura Kluk	37	Engaged	Koh Samui, Thailand	Eliminated 6th (in Delhi, India)
Marsio Juwono	34	Brothers	Jakarta, Indonesia	Eliminated 7th (in Dubai, United Arab Emirates)
Mardy Juwono	36	Brothers	Jakarta, Indonesia	Eliminated 7th (in Dubai, United Arab Emirates)
Andrew Tan	26	Dating	Kuala Lumpur, Malaysia	Third Place
Park Syeon	28	Dating	Kuala Lumpur, Malaysia	Third Place
Sandy Sydney	29	Dating	Hong Kong, China	Second Place
Francesca Etzdorf	27	Dating	Hong Kong, China	Second Place
Zabrina Fernandez	26	Co-Workers	Kuala Lumpur, Malaysia	Winners
Joe Jer Tee	29	Co-Workers	Kuala Lumpur, Malaysia	Winners

=== Future appearances ===
In 2010, Aubrey Miles appeared in Survivor Philippines: Celebrity Showdown, the Philippine version of Survivor. In 2014, Melody Chen appeared on Leg 9 of The Amazing Race 25 as a Pit Stop greeter in Singapore. In 2016, Zabrina & Joe Jer appeared as the Pit Stop greeters for the third leg of The Amazing Race Asia 5 in their home country of Malaysia. In 2017, Sahran, seven months after being elected mayor of Haslemere, appeared on the British cooking programme Come Dine with Me. In 2021, Sahil Shroff competed on Bigg Boss 15, the Indian version of Big Brother.

== Results ==
The following teams participated in the season, with their relationships at the time of filming. Placements are listed in finishing order:

- A red placement with a dagger (†) indicates that the team was eliminated.
- An underlined blue placement with a double-dagger (‡) indicates that the team was the last to arrive at a Pit Stop in a non-elimination leg, and were forced to relinquish all of their money, were not allotted money for the next leg, and were not allowed to acquire money until they started the next leg.
- An italicized placement means it is a team's placement at the midpoint of a double leg.
- A green ƒ indicates that the team won a Fast Forward.
- A brown > indicates that the team chose to use the Yield; brown < indicates the team who received it.

Team placement (by leg)
Team	1	2	3 (Note: Five of the nine teams received 4-hour penalties at the Pit Stop for failing to complete the Roadblock (Joe Jer, Marsio, Andy, Syeon, and Aubrey). The initial order of arrival for all teams are as follows (the four italicized teams did not receive a penalty): 1st: Zabrina & Joe Jer; 2nd: Howard & Sahran; 3rd: Sandy & Francesca; 4th: Mardy & Marsio; 5th: Andy & Laura; 6th: Andrew & Syeon; 7th: Melody & Sharon; 8th: Sahil & Prashant; 9th: Aubrey & Jacqueline. Aubrey & Jacqueline were eliminated without the 4-hour penalty being issued, since they were already in last place.)	4	5	6	7	8	9a (Note: Leg 9 was a double leg, which had two Detours and two Roadblocks shown over two episodes. The placements listed for the first half is in order of teams' arrival at the Pit Stop in Kolkata.)	9b	10	11	12
Zabrina & Joe Jer	3rd	4th	5th	6th	3rd	3rd	6th‡	5th	4th	4th	3rd	2nd	1st
Sandy & Francesca	10th‡	9th	2nd	3rd	5th	1st	4th	3rd	5th	1st> (Note: Sandy & Francesca used the Yield against Andy & Laura)	1st	3rd	2nd
Andrew & Syeon	5th (Note: Andrew & Syeon initially arrived 1st, but they did not follow the trail as instructed in their clue to the Pit Stop, and were asked to complete it before checking in. Four teams checked in while they went back, dropping Andrew & Syeon to 5th.)	8th	8th	1st	2nd	4th	2nd	4th	2nd	3rd	2nd	1st	3rd
Mardy & Marsio	1st	2nd	6th	4th	6th	5th	5th	1stƒ (Note: This team won the Fast Forward in this particular leg.)	3rd	2nd	4th‡	4th†	
Andy & Laura	7th	7th	7th	7th (Note: Laura suffered an injury to her left leg on the way to Oceanworld. After the tests were done, she was allowed to continue the next leg.)	1st	2nd (Note: Andy & Laura were caught speeding at 146 km/h while the speed limit was 100 km/h. The penalty was 2 minutes times the number of km/h by which they had exceeded the speed limit. They were issued a 92-minute penalty that was assessed at the start of the following leg, therefore departing from the Pit Start last.)	1st	2nd	1st	5th†<			
Howard & Sahran	9th (Note: For unknown reasons on the subsequent leg, the starting placements of Howard & Sahran and Sahil & Prashant were switched, resulting in Howard & Sahran and Sahil & Prashant starting in 8th and 9th place, respectively.)	3rd	1st	8th‡ (Note: Howard & Sahran were issued a 4-hour penalty because Howard failed to complete the Roadblock. They checked into the Pit Stop last, but were notified that the leg was a non-elimination Leg. The 4-hour penalty they took from the Roadblock would be instead applied at the starting time at Leg 5.)	4th	6th	3rd	6th†					
Melody & Sharon	6th	5th	3rd	2nd	7th	7th†							
Sahil & Prashant	8th	1stƒ	4th	5th	8th† (Note: Sahil & Prashant initially arrived 5th, but were issued a 1-hour penalty because they were driven around in a private vehicle in Devonport, breaking an Amazing Race rule prohibiting hitch-hiking. The last three teams trailing them (Sandy & Francesca, Mardy & Marsio and Melody & Sharon) checked-in during their penalty time, dropping Sahil & Prashant to last place and resulting in their elimination.)								
Aubrey & Jacqueline	4th	6th	9th†										
Ernie & Jeena	2nd	10th†											

== Race summary ==
Complete route map Note: the green dot represents both the starting city and the transfer point of the final leg.

Destinations	Air travel Rail travel Water travel Bus travel Helicopter travel Bicycle travel Gondola travel
Route Markers	Detour Roadblock Fast Forward Yield Pit Stop

=== Leg 1 (Malaysia) ===
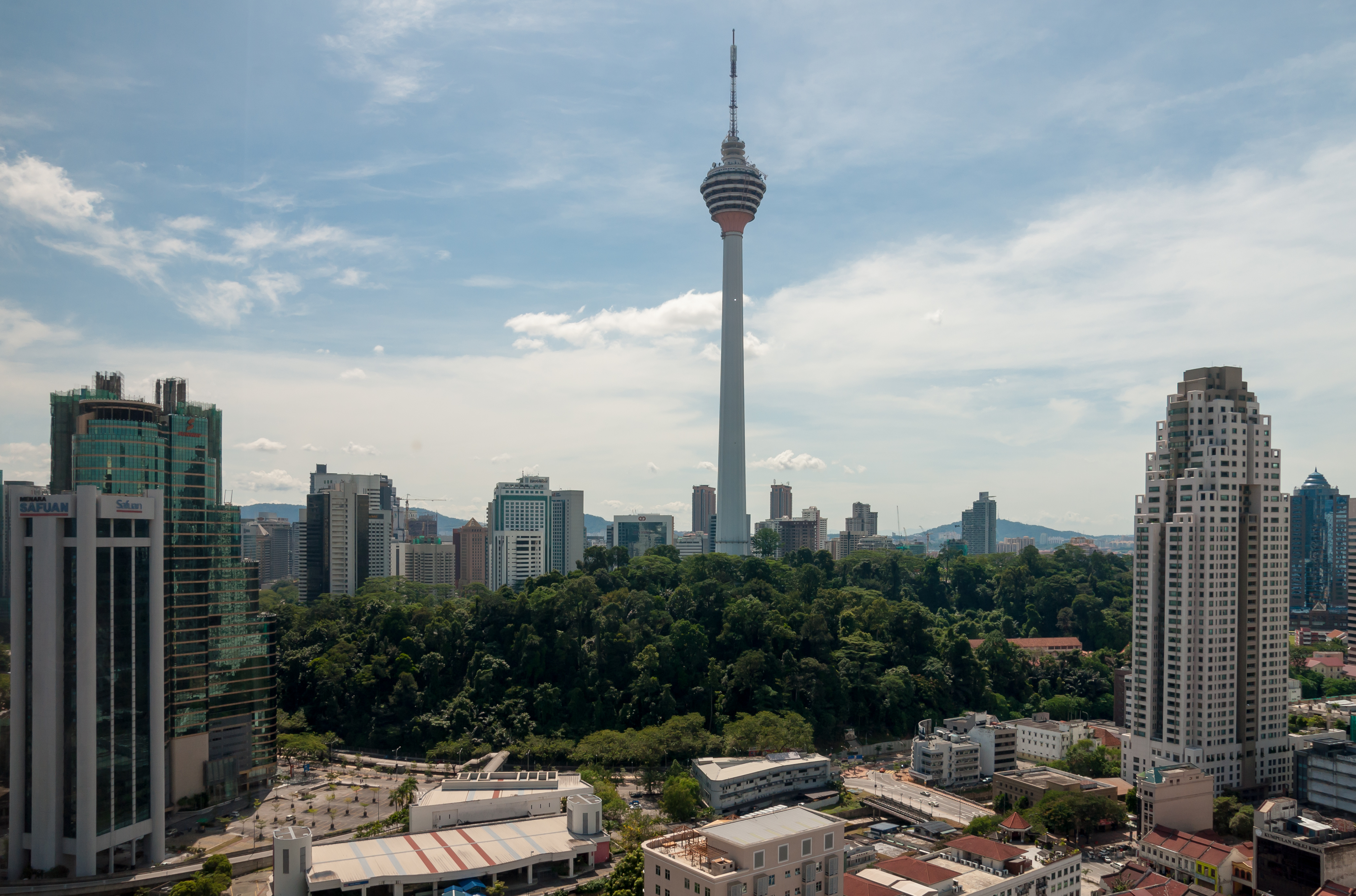
Teams finished the inaugural leg of The Amazing Race Asia in Bukit Nanas, atop of KL Tower.

- Episode 1: "I Don't Think I Can Do This" (9 November 2006)

Locations

- Kuala Lumpur, Malaysia (Independence Square) (Starting Line)
- Kuala Lumpur (Berjaya Times Square)
- Kuala Lumpur (Kompleks Kraf)
- Shah Alam (Shah Alam Stadium – City Karting Enterprise)
- Kuala Lumpur (Bukit Nanas Forest Reserve)
- Kuala Lumpur (Kuala Lumpur Tower)

Episode summary

- Teams set off from Independence Square in Kuala Lumpur to retrieve their next clue, directed them to Berjaya Times Square where teams had to rappel down from the eight level of the shopping mall to grab their next clue down from the ground, instructed to drive themselves to Kompleks Kraf.
- This series' first Detour was a choice between Paint or Pot. In Paint, team members had to work together to make a batik painting based on the design shown to them to receive their next clue. In Pot, one team member had to make a pot from clay using a pottery wheel while the other member controlled the wheel's spin to receive their next clue.
- After the Detour, teams had to drive to Shah Alam Stadium and each team member had to complete four consecutive laps around the circuit in go-karts before receiving their next clue.
- Before heading to the Pit Stop, teams were instructed to follow a certain trail in the Bukit Nanas Forest Reserve to the top of the Kuala Lumpur Tower.

Additional note

- This was a non-elimination leg.

=== Leg 2 (Malaysia → Indonesia) ===
The National Monument in Indonesia's capital city of Jakarta served as the Pit Stop of this leg.

- Episode 2: "They're Speedy, They're Fast and They're First" (16 November 2006)
- Eliminated: Ernie & Jeena

Locations

- Kuala Lumpur (Kuala Lumpur Tower)
- Kuala Lumpur (Kuala Lumpur International Airport – Low Cost Carrier Terminal) → Jakarta, Indonesia (Soekarno–Hatta International Airport)
- Jakarta (Ragunan Zoo)
  - Jakarta (SMA Negeri 60 High School (in Indonesian))
- Jakarta (Taman Mini Indonesia Indah – West Sumatra Pavilion)
- Jakarta (Pasar Kaget Melawai (in Indonesian))
- Jakarta (Merdeka Square – MONAS (National Monument))

Episode summary

- At the start of the leg, teams were instructed to drive to the airport's low cost carrier terminal and to catch on a pre-arranged AirAsia flight to Jakarta, Indonesia. Once there, they had to travel to Ragunan Zoo for their next clue.
- In this series' first Roadblock, one team member had to retrieve a clue in a box located inside a snake pit containing dangerous species second to anaconda in size, within two minutes.
- In this series' first Fast Forward, teams had to search among 50 students at the courtyard inside SMA Negeri 60 High School with Sony Walkman MP3 players. The first team to find the one Walkman playing a message that they have chosen correctly could exchange the Walkman for the Fast Forward award. Sahil & Prashant won the Fast Forward.
- Teams who did not attempt the Fast Forward had to travel to Taman Mini Indonesia Indah and had to find West Sumatra Pavilion. Once there, they had to perform a native Minangkabau plate dance called Tari Piring to follow the moves correctly until they would receive their next clue.
- This leg's Detour was a choice between Push or Sell. Both Detours required teams to travel to Pasar Kaget Melawai and searched for the marked bakso vendors. In Push, teams had to push a bakso cart 500 metres (0.31 mi) along a marked route, without spilling any soy sauce, while singing a traditional child song, "Abang Tukang Bakso" to receive their next clue. In Sell, teams had to sell (or eat) 15 bowls of bakso, each with a minimum selling price of Rp 2,000, to receive their next clue.
- After the Detour, teams must travel to MONAS (National Monument) and had to find IRTI car park entrance for the Pit Stop.

=== Leg 3 (Indonesia) ===
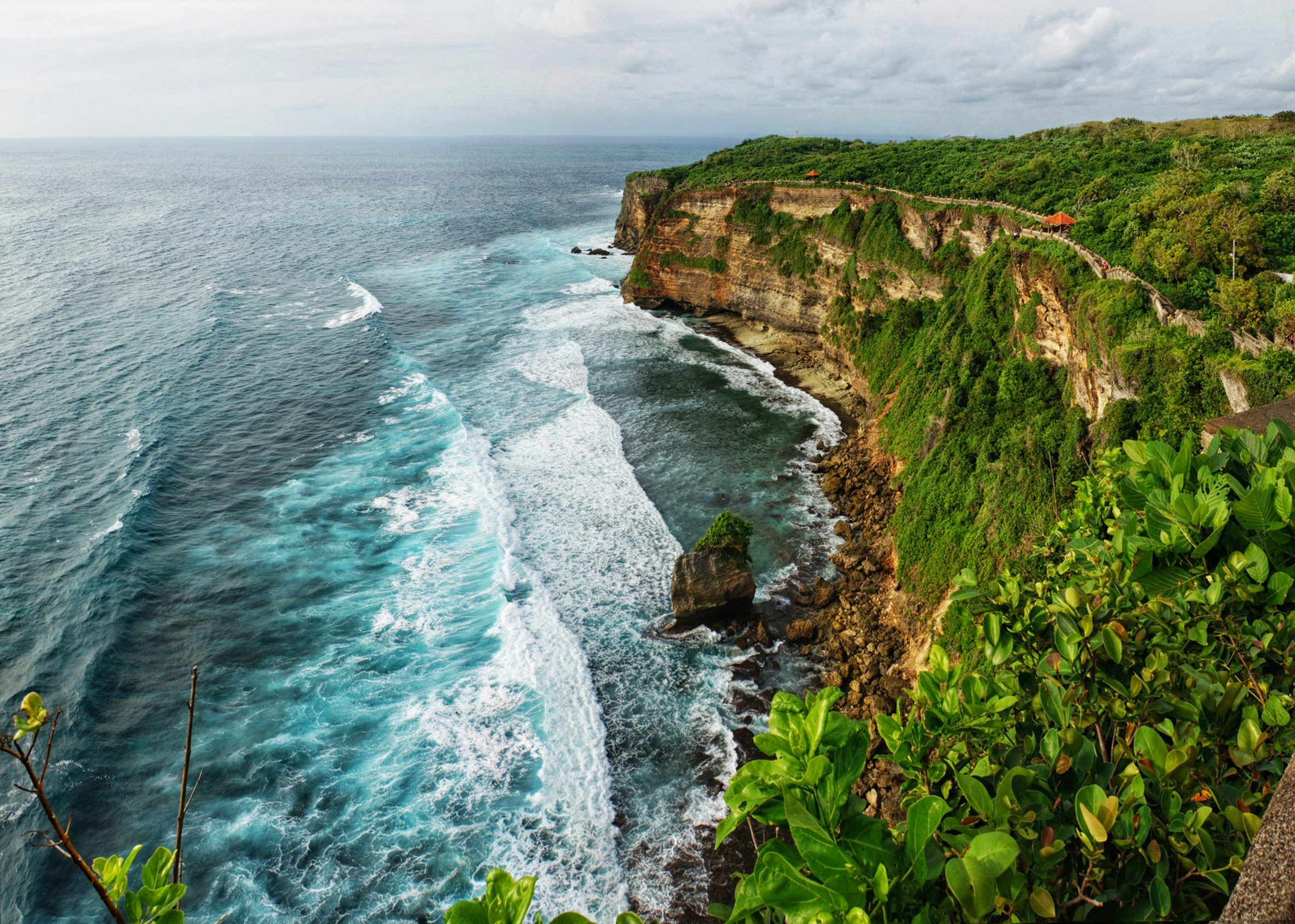
While in Bali, Indonesia, teams visited Uluwatu where they searched for their clue inside the caves within its rock formations.

- Episode: "Give Me the Strength, Give Me the Strength" (23 November 2006)
- Prize: A Sony High-Definition Handycam for each team member (awarded to Howard & Sahran)
- Eliminated: Aubrey & Jacqueline

Locations

- Jakarta (Merdeka Square – MONAS (National Monument))
- Jakarta (Soekarno–Hatta International Airport) → Denpasar, Bali (Ngurah Rai International Airport)
- Kuta (Kuta Beach)
- Kuta (Poppies Lane 2 – Internet Outpost Travellers Lounge)
- Ubud (Ubud Monkey Forest)
- Ubud (Bali Adventure Rafting or Elephant Safari Park)
- Uluwatu (Uluwatu Surfing Beach)
- Tabanan (Tanah Lot Temple)

Episode summary

- At the start of the leg, teams were instructed to fly to the island of Bali. Once there, they had to travel to Kuta Beach for their next clue.
- In this leg's Roadblock, one team member had to dig in a marked area of sand around Kuta Beach for a souvenir, a small wooden surfboard, hidden up to 40 centimetres (0.44 yd) beneath the sand to receive their next clue.
- After the Roadblock, teams had to travel to Internet Outpost Travellers Lounge where they had to log in to their MSN account at the internet cafe's computers and search the website for the words "Amazing Race Asia" to reveal their next clue on screen, which they may print out or receive from an attendant, directing them to Ubud Monkey Forest where they would grab their next clue.
- This leg's Detour was a choice between Wet or Dry. In Wet, teams had to traverse down 500 steps to the Ayung River, ride through the white water rapids and complete a two-mile (3.2 km) course on the water until they reach their clue at the end of the course. In Dry, teams had to ride on an elephant through a course to receive their next clue.
- After the Detour, teams must travel to Uluwatu Surfing Beach where they had to follow the marked stairs down to the beach and find their next clue hidden within the caves, directing them to the Pit Stop: Tanah Lot Temple.

Additional note

- Joe Jer, Marsio, Andy, Syeon, and Aubrey chose to quit the Roadblock. Four of the five penalized teams were issued four-hour penalties that were applied at the start of the next leg, while Aubrey & Jacqueline were the last team to arrive at the Pit Stop and were therefore eliminated.

=== Leg 4 (Indonesia → Australia) ===
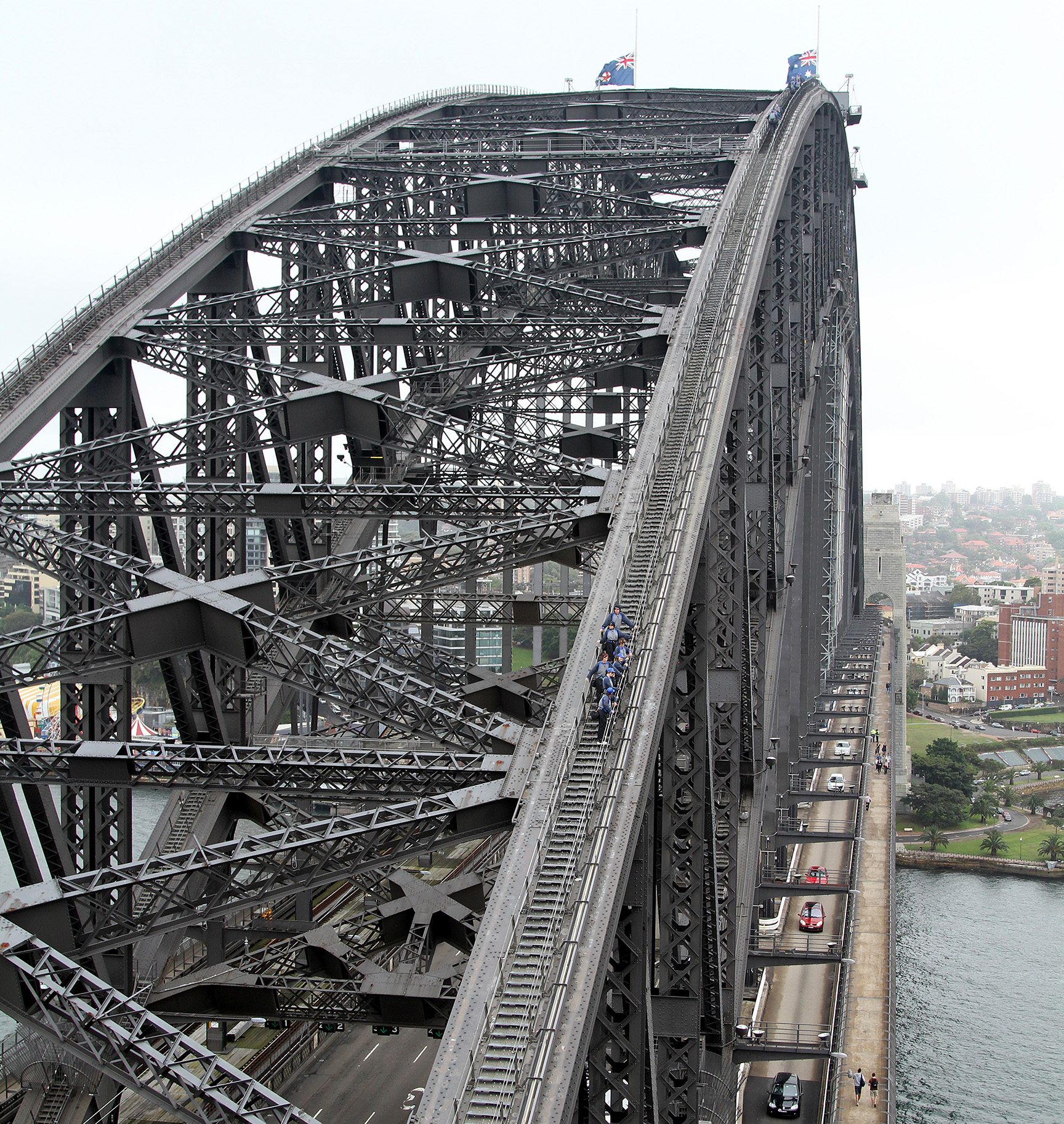
One of the Detour options in Sydney required teams to climb up the famous Sydney Harbour Bridge to retrieve their clue.

- Episode: "Just Shut Up and Do It" (30 November 2006)

Locations

- Denpasar (Pura Dalem Salewa)
- Denpasar (Ngurah Rai International Airport) → Sydney, Australia (Sydney Airport)
- Sydney (Dawes Point – Pier 1)
- Sydney (Sydney Harbour Bridge or Circular Quay and Doyle's at the Quay)
- Sydney (Mrs Macquarie's Chair)
- Sydney (World Square – SonyCentral)
- Sydney (Circular Quay Ferry Wharf → Manly Wharf)
- Sydney (Manly – Oceanworld)
- Sydney (Manly Wharf → Circular Quay Ferry Wharf)
- Sydney (Darling Harbour – The Tall Bounty)

Episode summary

- At the start of the leg, teams were instructed to fly to Sydney, Australia. Once there, they had to travel to Dawes Point to look for Pier 1 for their next clue.
- This leg's Detour was a choice between Elevation or Crustacean. In Elevation, teams had to climb up a large number of steps to the top of the Sydney Harbour Bridge to receive their next clue. In Crustacean, teams made their way on foot to the seafood restaurant Doyle's at the Quay. Once there, they had to shell 14 kilograms (31 lb) of cold prawns, ensuring that the tail, the head and the back were properly removed, to receive their next clue from the restaurant chef.
- After the Detour, teams instructed to head to Mrs Macquarie's Chair and search for their next clue, leading them to SonyCentral store, where they had to take a Sony HD Camera and use it to record a video of someone singing a local bush ballad, titled "Click Go the Shears". Once they were done, they had to go back to SonyCentral and have the video be played on a television. If the person they filmed had sung the lyrics to the correct tune, the staff at SonyCentral would hand them their next clue. If not, they would have to re-do the task.
- After finishing the task, teams had to take a ferry to Manly where they were told that "dangerous Australian animals will lead them to their next clue", left teams figured out they must travel by foot to the Oceanworld.
- In this leg's Roadblock, one team member had to dive into the aquarium in Oceanworld Manly, where they had to swim with sharks, stingrays, turtles and fishes to retrieve their next clue.
- After the Roadblock, teams had to take a water taxi to the Pit Stop: The Tall Bounty on Darling Harbour.

Additional notes

- This was a non-elimination leg.
- Howard & Sahran were issued a 4-hour penalty because Howard failed to complete the Roadblock.

=== Leg 5 (Australia → New Zealand) ===
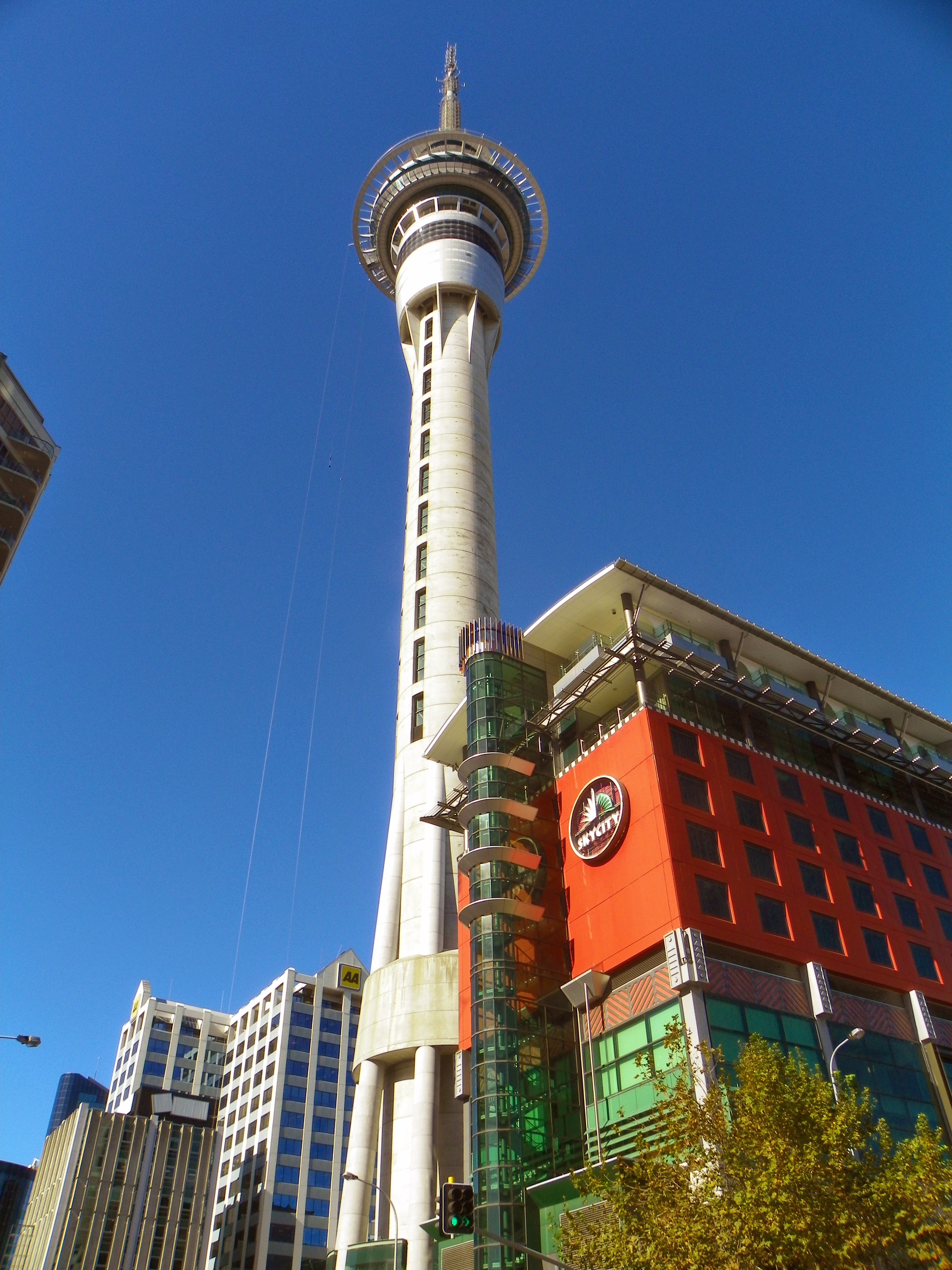
While in Auckland, teams visited the Sky Tower and climbed to the top.

- Episode: "It's Blowing Like Your Mum's Pants on a Windy Day" (7 December 2006)
- Eliminated: Sahil & Prashant

Locations

- Sydney (Port Jackson)
- Sydney (Sydney Airport) → Auckland, New Zealand (Auckland Airport)
- Auckland (Auckland Ferry Terminal and Devonport Ferry Terminal)
- Auckland (Victoria Park or Westhaven Marina)
- Auckland (Sky Tower)
- Auckland (Auckland Museum)

Episode summary

- At the start of the leg, teams were instructed to fly to Auckland, New Zealand. Once there, they had to travel by taxi to Auckland Ferry Terminal and board a ferry to Devonport Ferry Terminal, where they had to search near the terminal for a child on a swing with their next clue.
- In this leg's Detour was a choice between Rigby or Rigging. In Rugby, teams had to take a taxi to Victoria Park. Once there, they had to put on rugby jerseys and kick rugby balls to score three goals to receive their next clue from the coach. The goals would only be counted if the rugby ball was kicked into the enclosed posts a height at least 22 metres. In Rigging, teams had to travel to Westhaven Marina and find the yachts. Once there, the instructor would give the teams instructions on how to use ropes and knots to get the sail up and receive their next clue.
- After the Detour, teams must travel to the Sky Tower, where they had to put on orange jumpsuits and perform the SkyCity Vertigo Climb. This task involved teams having to climb up a ladder to the top of the Sky Tower where they would have a 360-view of Downtown Auckland. Their next clue would be handed to them only after they have completed the climb. Teams then made their way to a platform on level 53.
- In this leg's Roadblock, one team member had to perform the SkyJump by falling 192 metres (630 ft) from the 53rd floor in a controlled descent. While the non-participating team member was watching down below, they had to use a Sony Ericsson Cyber-shot camera to take a picture of their partner doing this task. Once team members reunited, they would receive their next clue, directing them to the Pit Stop: Auckland Museum.

Additional note

- Sahil & Prashant were issued a 1-hour penalty because they were driven around in a private vehicle in Devonport, breaking an Amazing Race rule prohibiting hitch-hiking.

=== Leg 6 (New Zealand) ===
Melody took part in the bungee jump Roadblock at Nevis Highwire Platform at Nevis River along with other racers.

- Episode: "What Have You Been Eating!" (14 December 2006)
- Eliminated: Melody & Sharon

Locations

- Auckland (Auckland Museum)
- Auckland (Auckland Airport) → Dunedin (Dunedin Airport)
- Queenstown (Caltex Petrol Kiosk)
- Queenstown (Skyline Gondola – Bob's Peak)
- Arrowtown (Chinese Settlement)
- Queenstown (Offroad Adventures) (Overnight Rest)
- Gibbston (Nevis Highwire Platform)
- Gibbston (Chard Farm Winery)

Episode summary

- At the start of the leg, teams were instructed to fly to Dunedin, in South Island. Once there, teams had to search the airport's parking lot for a marked vehicle to grab their next clue, directing them to drive to Queenstown to locate a Caltex Petrol Kiosk, where they had to fill up their vehicles with fuel and pay for it using a Caltex Cash Card before receiving their next clue.
- In this leg's Detour was a choice between Ledge or Luge. In Ledge, each team member had to take a turn performing the ledge swing, which hurls them 400 metres (0.25 mi) above Queenstown, before receiving their next clue. In Luge, teams had to complete a tack team relay with each team member by navigating a luge through a 830 metres (0.52 mi) circuit track a total of four times to get their next clue.
- After the Detour, teams had to drive to the Chinese Settlement in Arrowtown for their next clue, instructing them to travel to Offroad Adventures to stay in for a night. On the following morning, teams had to drive an all-terrain vehicle around a tricky and muddy course 1 mile (1.6 km) in order to receive their next clue, directing them to Nevis Highwire Platform in Gibbston.
- In this leg's Roadblock, one team member had to bungee jump 134 metres (440 ft) over Nevis Valley, reputedly the world's wildest bungee jump. They only had two minutes after they step on the platform to do so, or forfeit their turn. After they were successfully done with the jump, the bungee instructor would give them their next clue, directing them to drive to the Pit Stop: Chard Farm Winery.

Additional notes

- Andy & Laura were caught speeding at 146 km/h while the speed limit was 100 km/h. The penalty was 2 minutes times the number of km/h by which they had exceeded the speed limit. They were issued a 92-minute penalty that was assessed at the start of the following leg.
- The bungee jump Roadblock was later revisited on Season 4 as a Switchback.

=== Leg 7 (New Zealand → Singapore → Thailand) ===
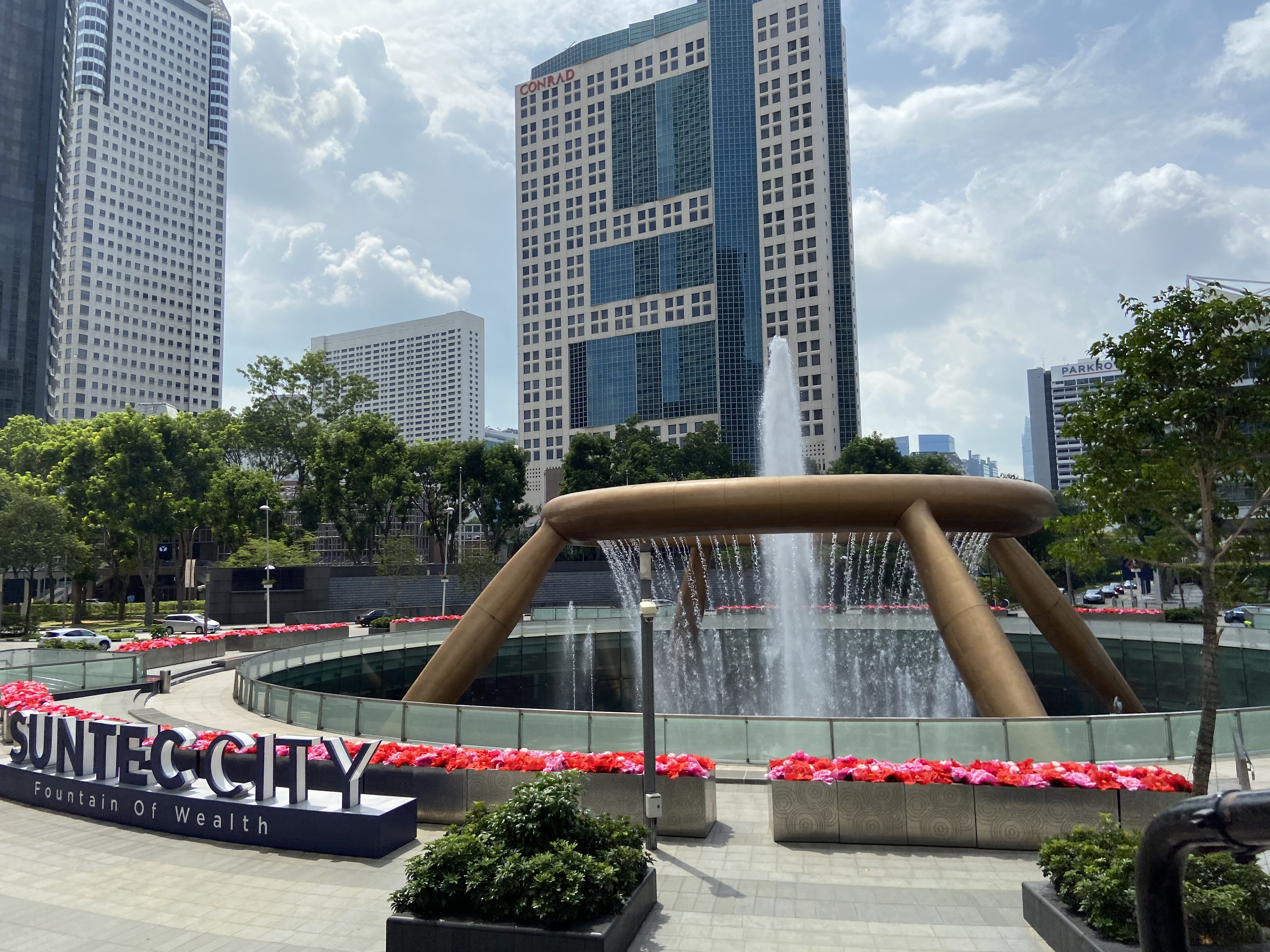
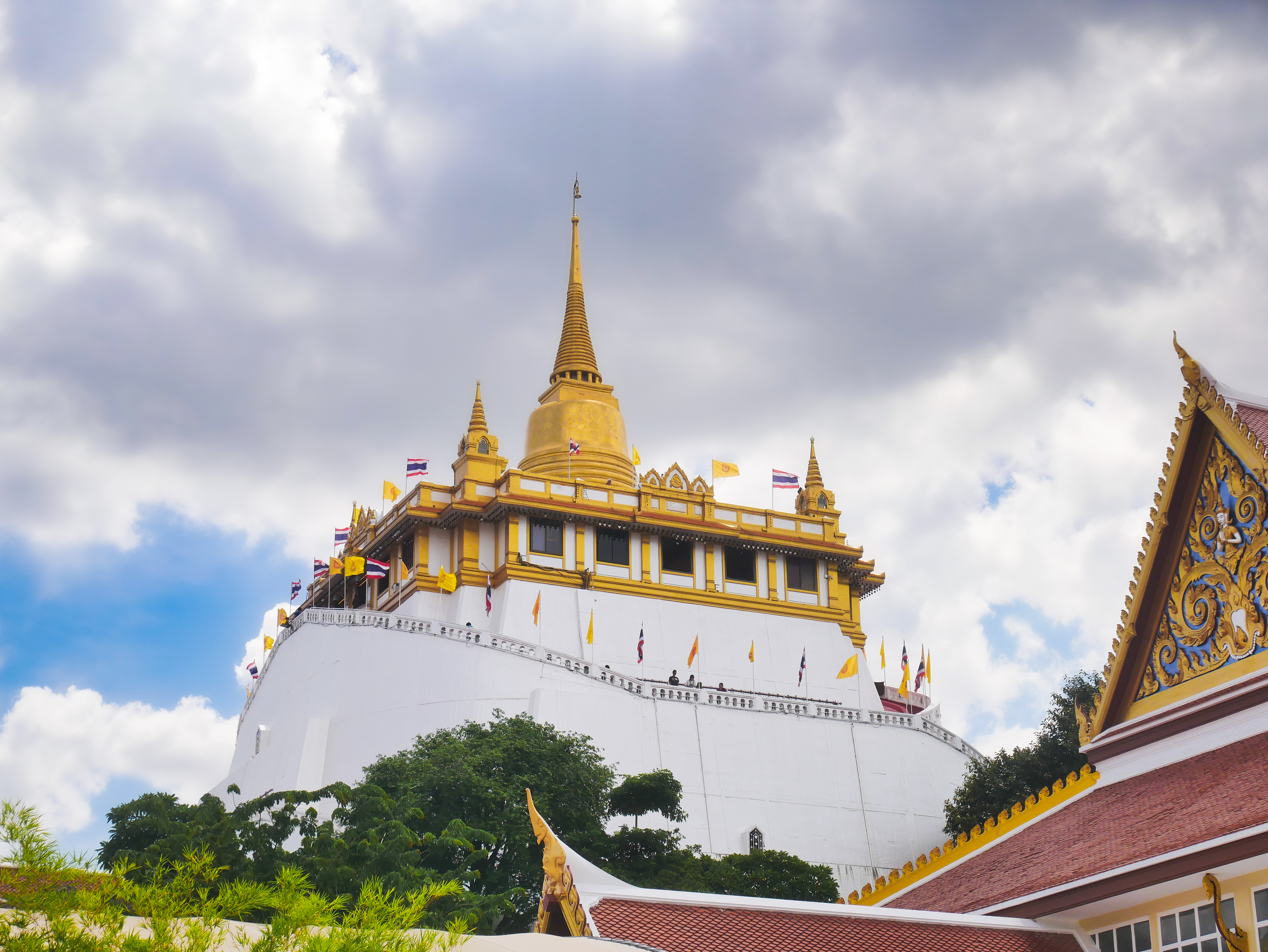
During this leg, teams visited the largest water fountain in the world (The Fountain of Wealth) in Singapore before heading to Bangkok and visit Golden Mount, which is depicted on the Thai 2 Baht coin.
- Episode: "Don't Stand There Doing Nothing!" (21 December 2006)
- Prize: A year's supply of an engine-cleaning fuel from Caltex (awarded to Andy & Laura)

Locations

- Gibbston (Chard Farm Winery)
- Queenstown (Queenstown Airport) → Singapore (Singapore Changi Airport)
- Singapore (MacPherson – Caltex Petrol Station)
- Singapore (Suntec City – Fountain of Wealth)
- Singapore (Changi Airport) → Bangkok, Thailand (Don Mueang International Airport)
- Ayutthaya (Wat Niwet Thammaprawat)
- Bangkok (Wat Saket – Golden Mount)
- Bangkok (Larn Luang Road and Pig Memorial or Pak Khlong Talat)
- Bangkok (Wat Pho)

Episode summary

- At the start of the leg, teams were instructed to fly to Singapore. Once there, they had to travel to the Caltex Petrol Station in the neighborhood of MacPherson, each team had to clean up an extremely dirty Ford Focus car until the Caltex employee in charge was satisfied to receive their next clue.
- After finishing the task, the clue directed teams to the Fountain of Wealth for their next clue, instructed to fly to Bangkok, Thailand. Once there, they must travel to Wat Niwet Thammaprawat in Ayutthaya, where they had to take a cable car over the river and then search the temple grounds for several clue boxes. Only one of these clue boxes would contain the right clue. Teams then had to figure out that their next destination was the Golden Mount, by finding out the monument depicted on the Thai 2 Baht coin enclosed in their clue envelope.
- In this leg's Roadblock, one team member had to climb to the top of the temple and then search through 560 golden bells for 100 clue capsules containing silver slips of paper. Out of the 100 silver slips of paper, only six contained the correct slip of paper instructing team members to receive their next clue from a temple worker.
- In this leg's Detour was a choice between Bacon or Eggs. In Bacon, teams had to find marked tuk-tuks on Larn Luang Road and then direct their tuk-tuk drivers to drive them to the Memorial for People Born in the Year of Pig (called Pig Memorial by the racers) to get their next clue. Teams were allowed to seek directions from locals but could not get assistance from the driver. In Eggs, teams had to travel to Pak Khlong Talat, find an egg store on Asadang Road, and deliver 20 trays of eggs to a nearby egg stall using a wheeler to receive their next clue. However, if any eggs were delivered broken, the store owner would instruct the teams to re-deliver that number of unbroken eggs.
- After the Detour, teams had to head to the Pit Stop: Wat Pho.

Additional note

- This was a non-elimination leg.

=== Leg 8 (Thailand) ===
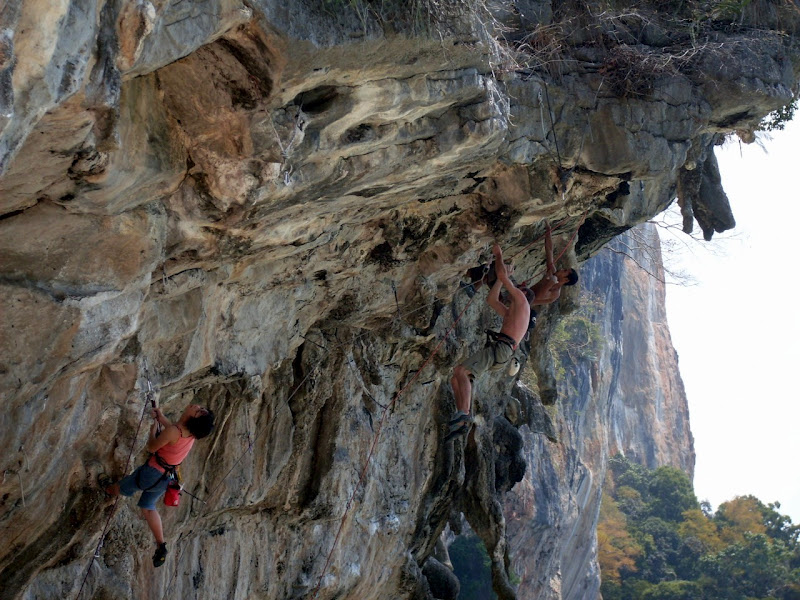
The Roadblock in Krabi required one team member to climb the Railay East rock wall.

- Episode: "My Legs Are Shaking Like Jelly" (28 December 2006)
- Eliminated: Howard & Sahran

Locations

- Bangkok (Wat Pho)
- Bangkok (Southern Bus Terminal) → Krabi (Krabi Bus Terminal)
- Ao Nang (Noppharat Thara Bay)
  - Hat Noppharat Thara–Mu Ko Phi Phi National Park (Pranang Bay)
- Hat Noppharat Thara–Mu Ko Phi Phi National Park (Koh Poda)
- Ao Phang Nga National Park (Railay East 123 Wall)
- Than Bok Khorani National Park (Koh Hong Lagoon)
- Than Bok Khorani National Park (Koh Pak Bia)

Episode summary

- At the start of the leg, teams were instructed to travel by bus to Krabi. Once there, they had to take a songthaew to Ao Nang Beach where they would find their next clue.
- In this season's second Fast Forward, teams had to find a kayak on Pranang Bay and then using it to look for a clue hidden in one of the many hidden caves near the area. The first team to find the clue would win the Fast Forward award. Mardy & Marsio won the Fast Forward.
- In this leg's Detour was a choice between Smash or Grab. In Smash, teams had to smash through a pile of 75 coconuts with a hammer until they found one with red ink inside it to receive their next clue. In Grab, teams had to snorkel through an area of the waters off Koh Poda with 100 buoys, each of which has an attached clue, until they found one of only marked "correct".
- In this leg's Roadblock, one team member had to climb up the face of Railay East 123 Wall in order to retrieve the next clue from the top, directing them to Koh Hong Lagoon and search the Pit Stop: Koh Pak Bia.

Additional note

- From Noppharat Thara Bay, teams had to travel by a long-tail boat for the rest of the leg.

=== Leg 9 (Thailand → India) ===
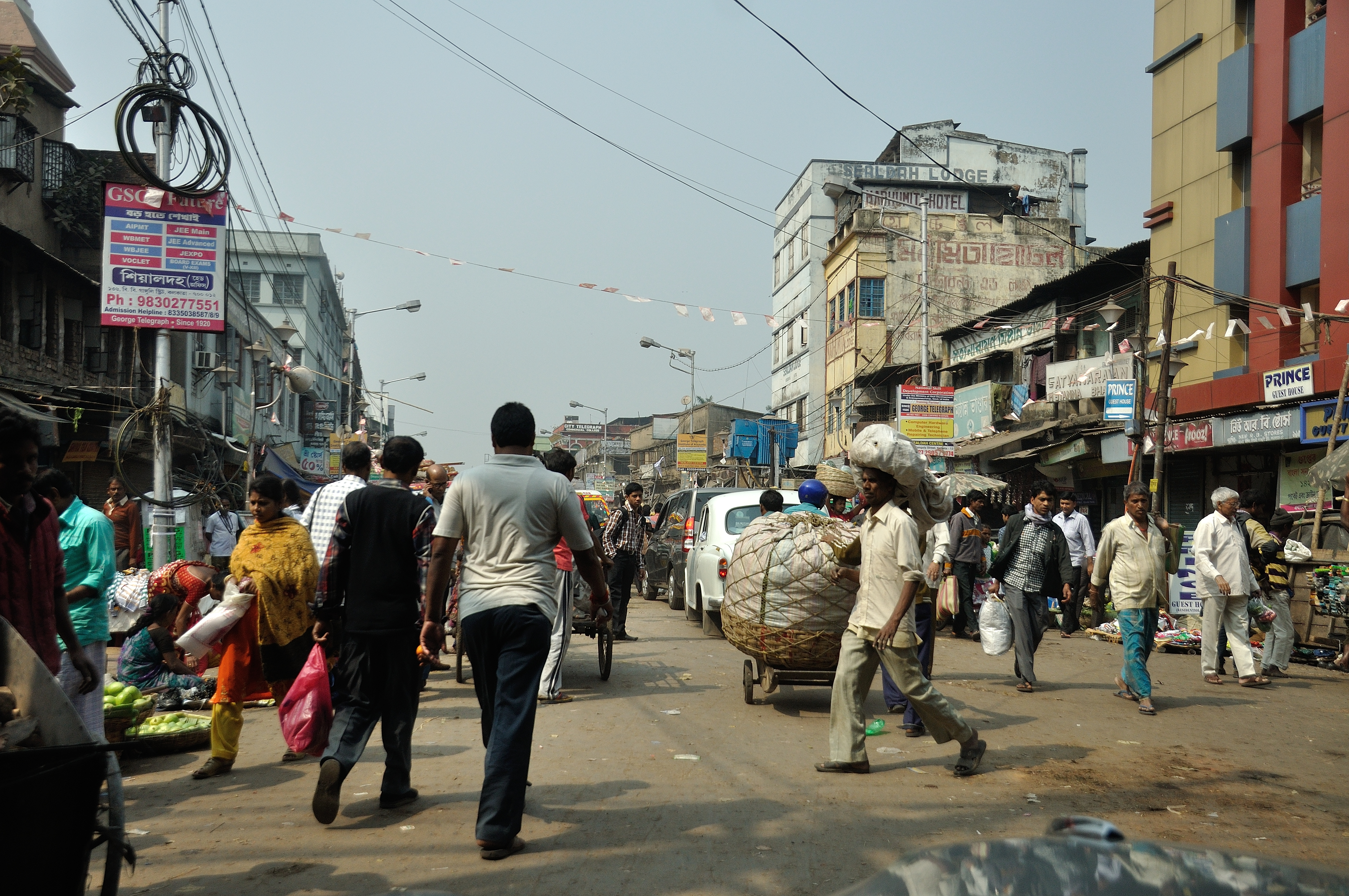
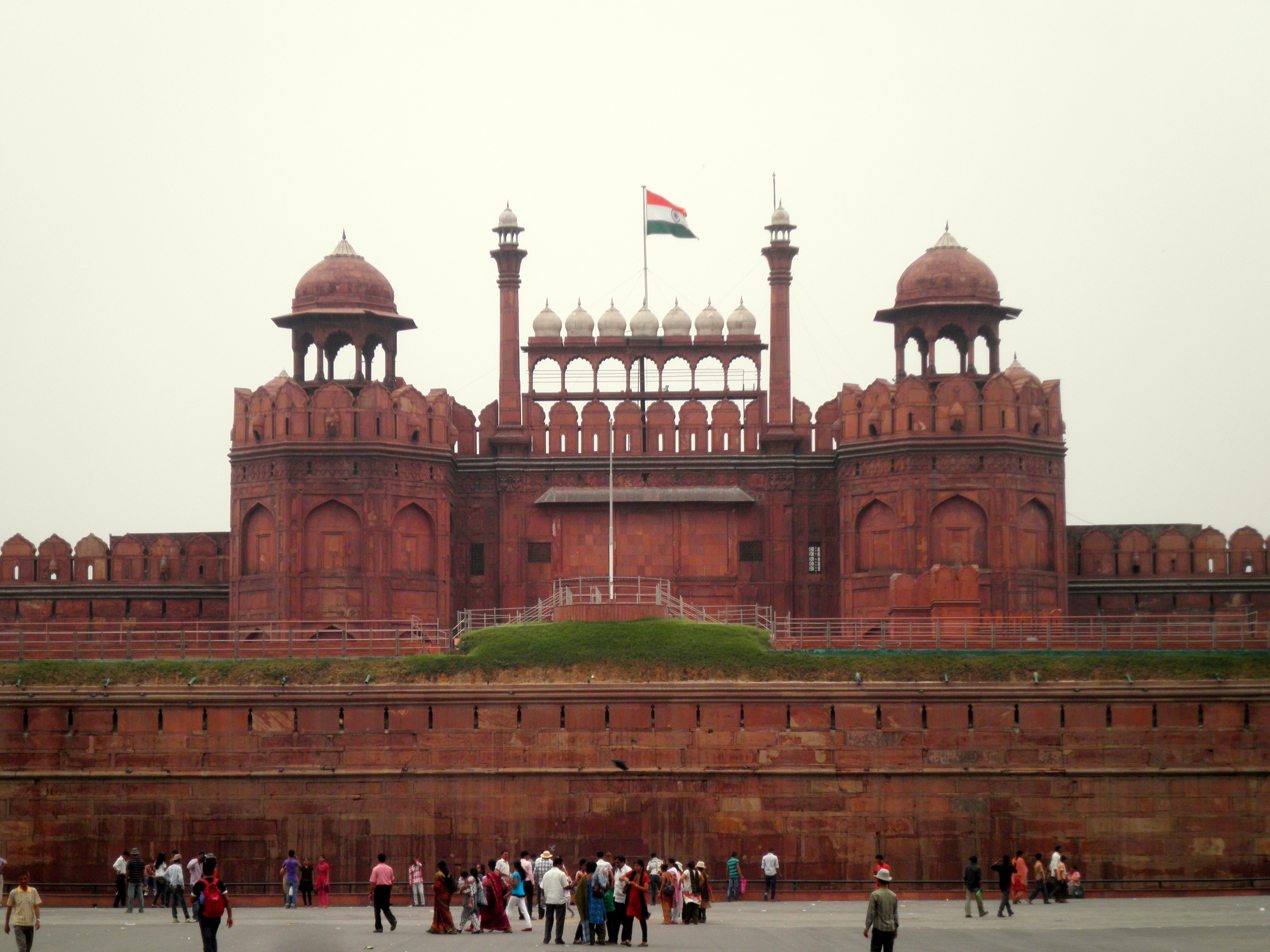
The double-length leg in India had teams checked in at the Mid-Point at B.B. Ganguly Street in Kolkata and later traveled to Delhi to visit the famous Red Fort where they encountered a Yield.
- Episode 9: "This Is Totally, Totally Out of This World!" (4 January 2007) & Episode 10: "War Has Begun!" (11 January 2007)
- Prize: A holiday to Langkawi, Malaysia, courtesy of AirAsia (awarded to Sandy & Francesca)
- Eliminated: Andy & Laura

Locations

- Ao Nang (Noppharat Thara Bay)
- Krabi (Krabi Airport) → Kolkata, India (Netaji Subhas Chandra Bose International Airport)
- Kolkata (St. Teresa of Avila Church)
- Kolkata (Tollygunge Metro Train Station)
- Kolkata (Peerless Inn Hotel – Aaheli Restaurant)
- Kolkata (Kanishka's Sari Boutique)
- Kolkata (West Bengal Kabaddi Association or Maniktala Bazar)
- Kolkata (Kolay Market (Indian Overseas Bank Rooftop overlooking Sealdah Train Station))
- Kolkata (Sealdah Main North Train Station) → New Delhi (New Delhi Railway Station)
- Delhi (Red Fort – Lahori Gate)
- Delhi (Gadodia Market (Sunny International Spice Shop) and Khari Baoli or Chandni Chowk and Lahori Gate Crossing)
- Delhi (Tibetan Monastery Market – Garib Gaushala)
- Delhi (Mehrauli – Jain Mandir Dada Bari)

Episode summary (episode 9)

- At the start of the leg, teams were instructed to fly to Kolkata, India. Once there, they had to travel to St. Teresa of Avila Church, where they were given the option to light a candle before retrieving their next clue, directing them to Tollygunge Metro Train Station where they would get their next clue.
- In this leg's first Roadblock, one team member had to polish seven shoes from bystanders and charge at least ₹5 for their service to receive their next clue.
- After the first Roadblock, teams had to travel to Aaheli Restaurant, where each team member must eat a traditional Bengali Indian meal to receive their next clue, directing them to Kanishka's Sari Boutique and they would grab their next clue.
- This leg's first Detour was a choice between Carry or Count. In Carry, teams had to deliver 80 litres (21 US gal) of milk by carrying jugs on their heads and pouring them into a metal bucket a distance away to receive their next clue. In Count, teams had to go to Maniktala Bazar and then correctly count the number of betel nuts in a basket to receive their next clue. Teams could only guess once before counting the nuts again.
- After the first Detour, teams had to head to B.B. Ganguly Street (known as Kolay Market) in Sealdah and searched for the marked entrance (that turned to be the Indian Overseas Bank) where they must climb the stairs to the rooftop terrace. There, teams met Allan, who told them that the leg was not over before handing them their next clue.

Episode summary (episode 10)

- Teams were instructed to travel by train to New Delhi. Upon arrival, they had to travel to the Red Fort in Delhi where must find Lahori Gate for their next clue.
- This leg's second Detour was a choice between Deliver or Donkey. In Deliver, teams had to find Sunny International Spice Shop at Gadodia Market with only a picture of the shop inside their Sony CyberShot for reference. Then, they must carry sacks of spices to a specific spice shop in Khari Baoli to get their next clue. In Donkey, teams had to transport onions using a donkey to an onion store to receive their next clue from the vendor.
- After the second Detour, teams must travel to Tibetan Monastery Market and search for their next clue.
- In this leg's second Roadblock, one team member had to fill a bucket with cow manure and then use it to make dung cakes by adding water and sticking them onto the wall to receive their next clue, directing them to the Pit Stop: Jain Mandir Dada Bari.

Additional note

- Leg 9 was a double leg that aired over two episodes.
- Sandy & Francesca chose to Yield Andy & Laura.

=== Leg 10 (India → United Arab Emirates) ===
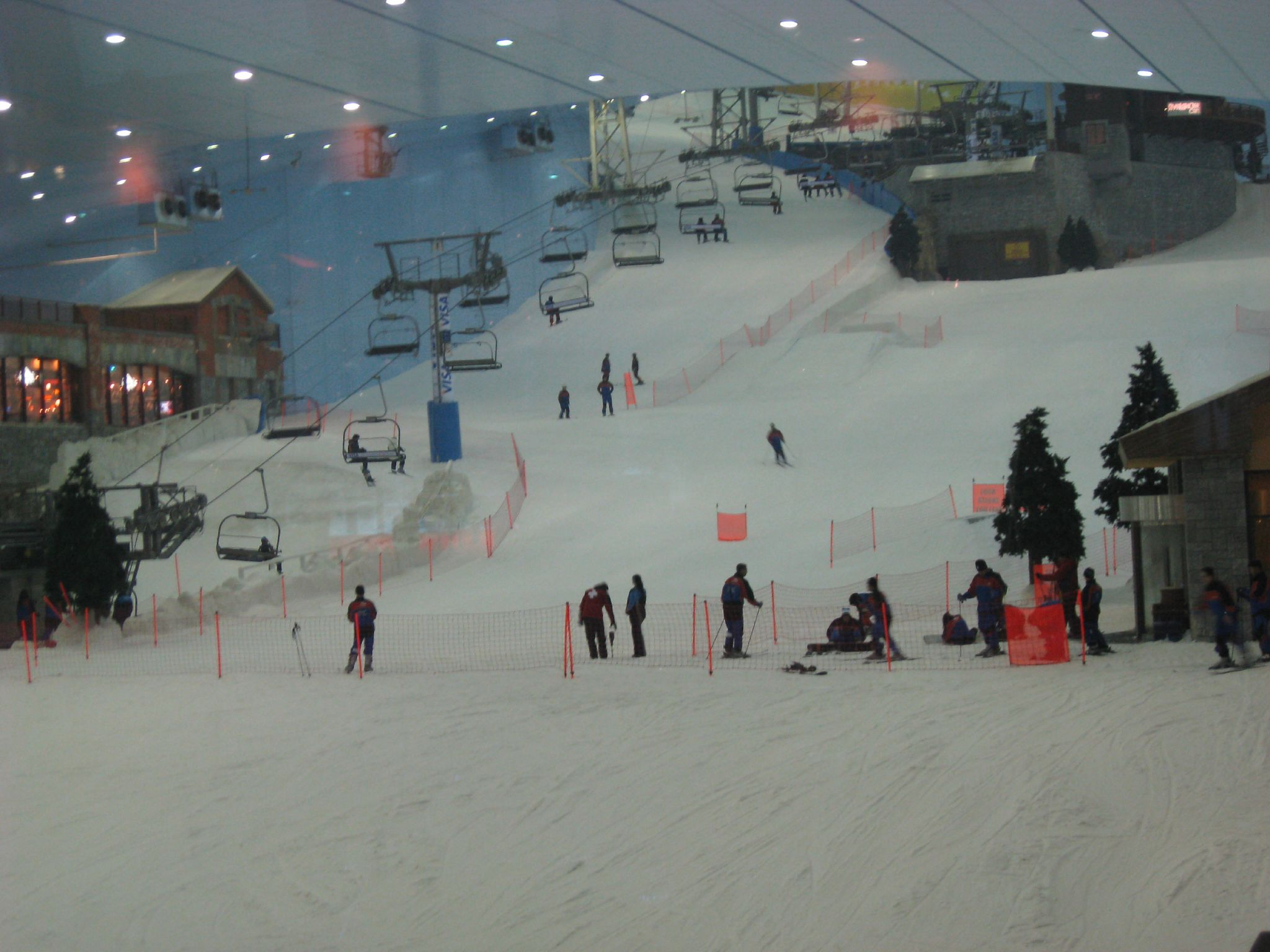
The Detour in Dubai took place entirely inside Ski Dubai, the largest indoor ski resort in the world, where one side of it required teams to hike the ski place's steepest slope.

- Episode 11: "This Is Going to Be Embarrassing!" (18 January 2007)

Locations

- Delhi (Mehrauli – Jain Mandir Dada Bari)
- Delhi (Indira Gandhi International Airport) → Dubai, United Arab Emirates (Dubai International Airport)
- Dubai (Bur Dubai Abra Station)
- Dubai (Dubai Creek Golf & Yacht Club)
- Dubai (Dubai International Marine Club – Leopard of Dubai)
- Dubai (Mall of the Emirates – Ski Dubai)
- Dubai (Gold Souk – Modern Jewellery Shop)
- Margham (Margham Desert Camp)

Episode Summary

- At the start of the leg, teams were instructed to fly to Dubai, United Arab Emirates. Once there, they had to head to Bur Dubai for an Abra station to look for their next clue, directing them to Dubai Creek Golf & Yacht Club, where they had to get their next clue.
- In this leg's Roadblock, one team member had to don into a golfing attire and compete a 9-hole golf course, using only a putter and one other club to receive their next clue. If team members lost a ball or broke a club, they had to return to the first tee for a replacement.
- After the Roadblock, teams had to head to Leopard of Dubai sailboat at Dubai International Marine Club where they would find their next clue, directing them to Ski Dubai.
- This leg's Detour was a choice between Hack or Hike. In Hack, teams had to chisel their way through a 150-kilogram (330 lb) block of ice to release their next clue, using only a chisel and a hammer. In Hike, teams had to climb the steepest slope in Ski Dubai while carrying 25 kilograms (55 lb) of skiing equipment to retrieve their next clue at the top of the slope.
- After the Detour, teams had to travel to Gold Souk and search for Modern Jewellery Shop to find a correct location where they would receive their next clue, directing them to Margham Desert Camp in Margham where they had to take a four-wheel drive to the Pit Stop: Margham Desert Camp.

Additional note

- This was a non-elimination leg.

=== Leg 11 (United Arab Emirates) ===
The penultimate leg of the race finished in Mina A'Salam Beach, overlooking Dubai's famous 7-star hotel Burj Al Arab.

- Episode: "Oh My Goodness, I Have to Eat a Brain!" (25 January 2007)
- Prize: A holiday to Gold Coast, Queensland, courtesy of Caltex (awarded to Andrew & Syeon)
- Eliminated: Mardy & Marsio

Locations

- Margham (Margham Desert Camp)
- Margham (Big Red Al Hamar – Desert Area 53)
- Sharjah (Gnat Al Qasba – Eye of the Emirates)
- Dubai (Raghdan Restaurant)
- Dubai (Sheikh Saeed Al Maktoum's House)
- Dubai (Wild Wadi Water Park – Jumeirah Sceirah)
- Dubai (Mina A'Salam Beach)

Episode summary

- At the start of the leg, teams encounter this leg's Detour in the Arabian Desert was a choice between Ride or Seek. In Ride, both team members had to sit on a camel and guide it through a marked course while using only a camel stick to collect five flags that they could exchange for their next clue. In Seek, teams would have had to use a metal detector to search a marked plot for a souvenir camel that they could exchange for their next clue. All teams chose Ride.
- After the Detour, teams had to travel to the Eye of the Emirates in Sharjah, where they had to choose one of the 42 cabins to look for a clue, with only five of the cabins containing their actual correct clue. The other cabins held clues that read "Sorry, Try Again" and teams had to complete one revolution of the ferris wheel before they could pick again. The clue led the teams to head to Raghdan Restaurant for their next clue.
- In this leg's Roadblock, one team member had to eat an Arabian specialty dish, which consisted of brains and bread, to receive their next clue from the restaurant owner.
- After the Roadblock, teams had to head to Sheikh Saeed Al Maktoum's House where they would find their next clue inside the house, directing them to Wild Wadi Water Park where both team members had to ride the Jumeirah Sceirah, the tallest and fastest free-fall water slide outside of North America, to receive their next clue, directing them to the Pit Stop: Mina A'Salam Beach overlooking Burj Al Arab.

=== Leg 12 (United Arab Emirates → Malaysia) ===
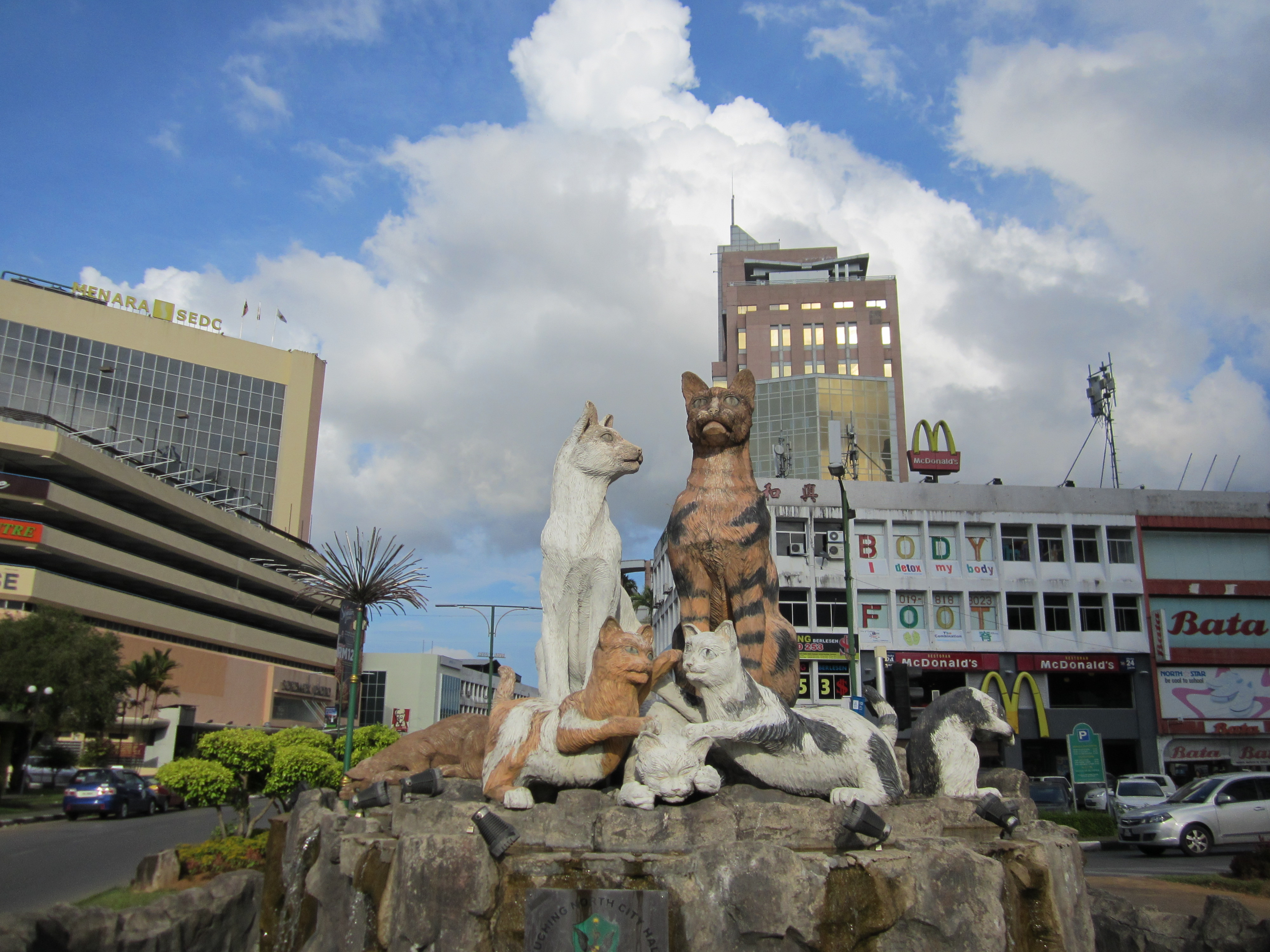
Upon arriving in Kuching, Sarawak, teams had to find the correct cat statue among many, which turned to be the one in its Golden Triangle.

- Episode: "24 Days, 15 Cities, 39,000 Kilometres and It Comes Down To This" (1 February 2007)
- Prize: US$100,000
- Winners: Zabrina & Joe Jer
- Runners-up: Sandy & Francesca
- Third place: Andrew & Syeon

Locations

- Dubai (Mina A' Salam Beach)
- Dubai (Dubai International Airport) → Kuala Lumpur, Malaysia (Kuala Lumpur International Airport)
- Kuala Lumpur (Kuala Lumpur Tower)
- Kuala Lumpur (Kuala Lumpur International Airport) → Kuching (Kuching International Airport)
- Kuching (Golden Triangle – "The Cat Family" Statue)
- Kuching (Old Courthouse)
- Kuching (India Street Mall or Pengkalan Sapi)
- Santubong (Sarawak Cultural Village)
- Santubong (Permai Rainforest Resort)
- Kuching District (Bako National Park)

Episode summary

- At the start of the leg, teams had to complete a jigsaw puzzle to reveal the country of their next location (Malaysia) before they could retrieve their next clue, were instructed to fly to Kuala Lumpur and instructed to travel to "Go to the first Pit Stop of the Race": Kuala Lumpur Tower, where they would get their next clue.
- The clue directed teams to fly to Kuching. Once there, they had to drive to the correct cat statue (known as "The Cat Family" located in Kuching's Golden Triangle) from the city's many cat statues that one of them has their next clue, directing them to the Old Courthouse and their next clue.
- This season's final Detour was a choice between Brain or Brawn. In Brain, teams had to travel to India Street Mall and assemble a wooden bench using only a Sony CyberShot picture as reference and tools provided to receive their next clue. In Brawn, teams would have had to find a marked fruit store at Pengkalan Sapi, where they must use traditional methods to carry 30 kilograms (66 lb) of fruits on their shoulders to a riverboat on the waterfront to receive their next clue. All teams chose Brain.
- After the Detour, teams had to drive to Sarawak Cultural Village at Santubong National Park where they had to search for their next clue hidden inside one of the longhouses. Their next clue instructed each team member to hit three coloured pineapples each using darts and a blowpipe to receive their next clue.
- In this season's final Roadblock, one team member had to compete a rope-based obstacle course overlooking the jungle to receive their final clue, directed them to Damai Beach and took a speedboat to Bako National Park. Once there, they must search the mangrove wild world to find the Finish Line.
