= Fountain of Wealth =

Largest fountain in Singapore and the world

- Air Pancut Kekayaan (Malay), 财富之泉 (Chinese)
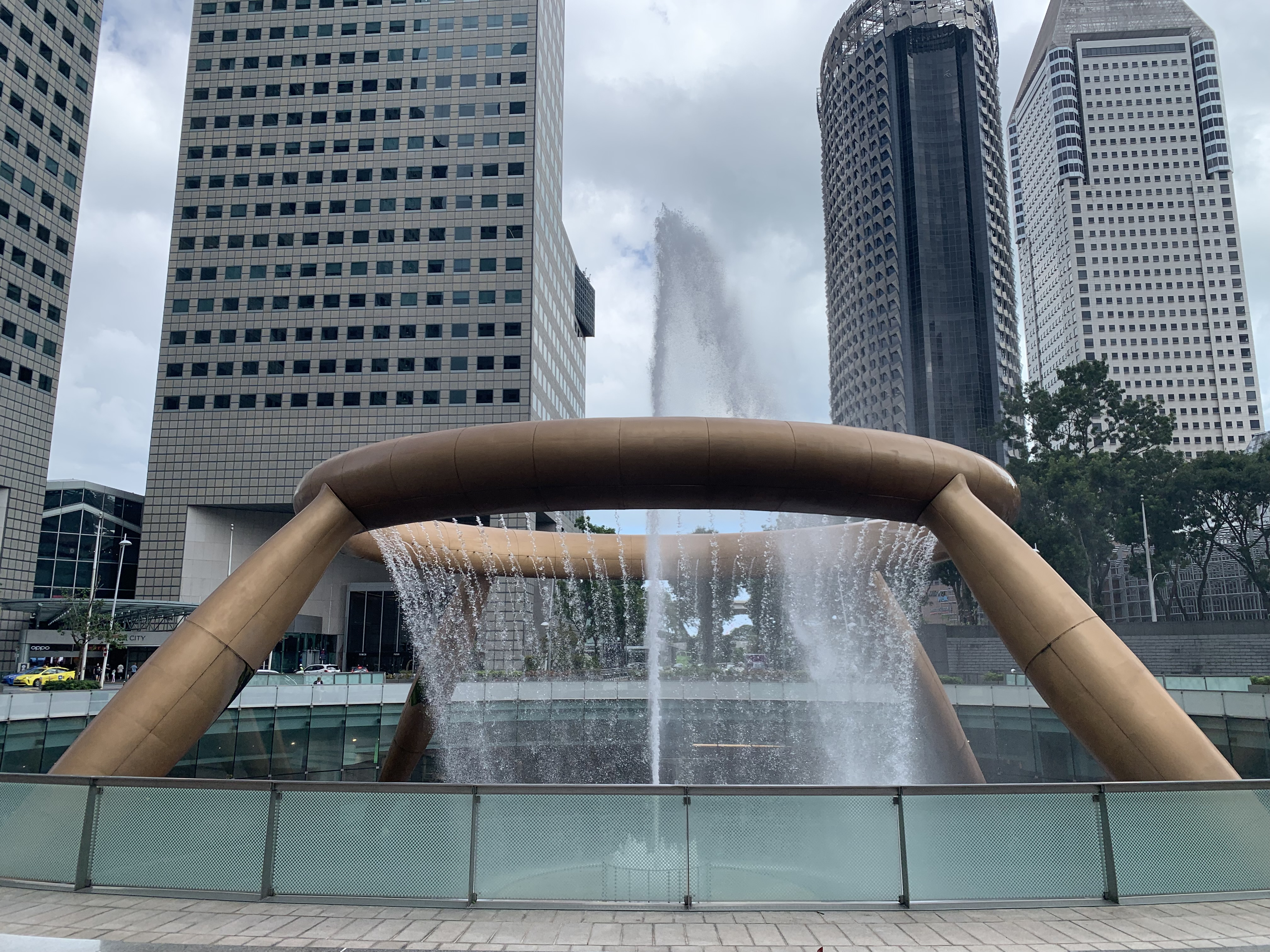
- The Fountain of Wealth at Suntec City, Singapore
- Year: 1995
- Medium: Silicon bronze
- Dimensions: 13.8 m (45 ft); 21 m diameter (69 ft)
- Location: Suntec City, Central Area, Singapore; 1°17′41.2″N 103°51′31.7″E

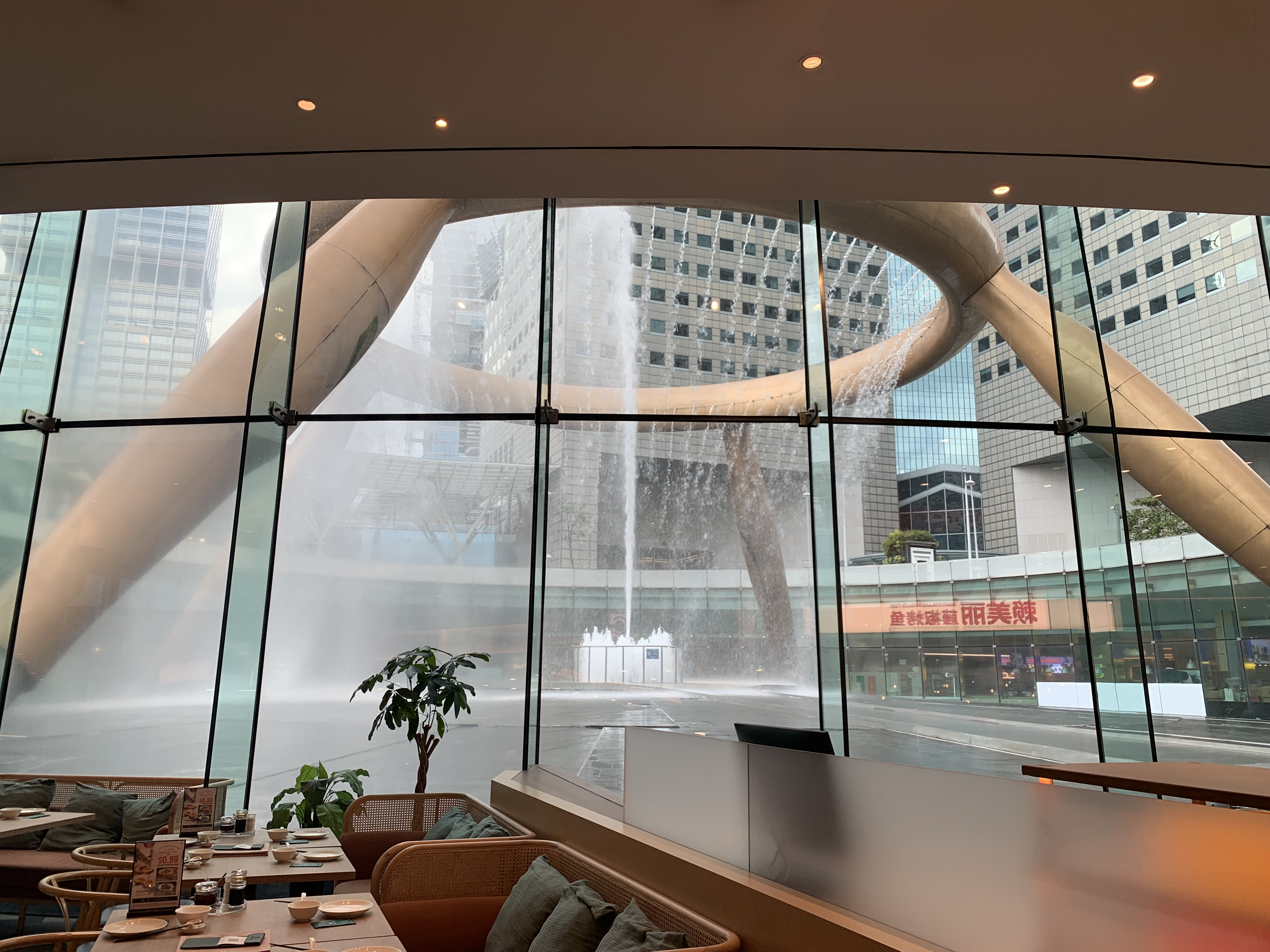
Fountain of Wealth as seen from restaurants surrounding its base

The Fountain of Wealth (Malay: Air Pancut Kekayaan, Chinese: 财富之泉) is listed by the Guinness Book of Records in 1998 as the largest fountain in the world. It is located in one of Singapore's largest shopping malls, Suntec City.

During certain periods of the day, the fountain is turned off and visitors are invited to walk around a mini fountain at the centre of the fountain's base, three times for good luck. At night, the fountain is the setting for laser performances, as well as live song and laser message dedications between 8 pm to 9 pm daily. It is situated in such a way the fountain is the hub of the shopping mall.

== Location ==
The base of the fountain is located underground, and on its base perimeter lies the main basement restaurant area of Suntec City. The circular ring top of the fountain is visible at ground level.

== Design ==
The Fountain of Wealth was constructed in 1995, together with the main Suntec City development. The name was derived according to Chinese geomancers, where the inward flow of water symbolize the symbol of wealth and life are pouring in, and the design of the bronze ring was based on Hindu Mandala, which represents unification and equality. The fountain earned the Guinness Book of World Records as the world's Largest Fountain in 1998. The fountain is made of silicon bronze, and consists of a circular ring with a circumference of 66 meters supported on four large slanted columns. It occupies an area of 1683.07 square metres, with a height of 13.8m. According to I. M. Pei, Suntec's designer, the buildings "form a whole", with the fountain "welding" them together.

== History ==
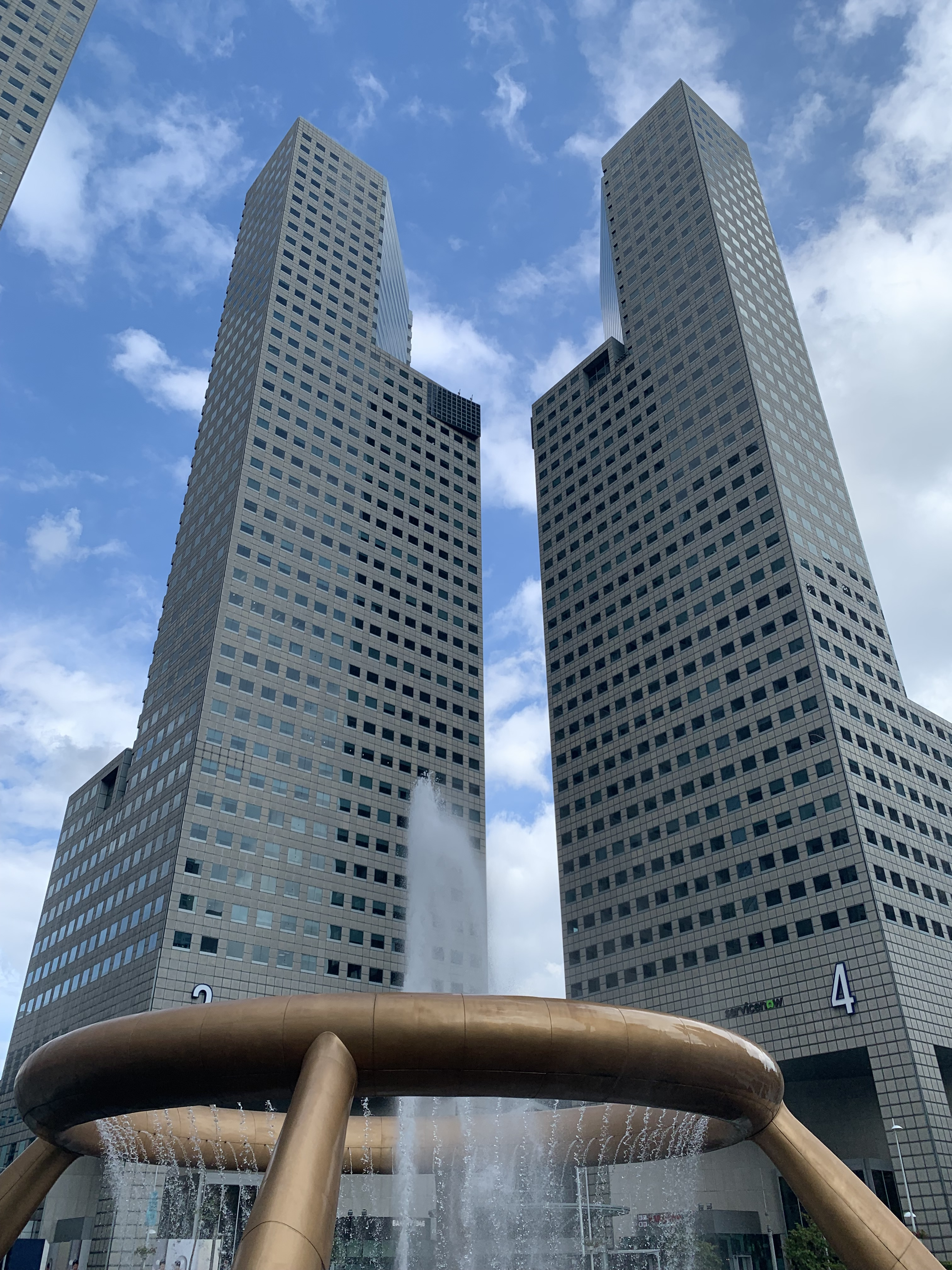
Fountain of Wealth and towers of Suntec City that were designed to resemble fingers of a hand

Plans for Marina Centre to have an exhibition and convention centre in the 1990s were announced in December 1987. By August 1988, three companies have submitted bids for the project. One of the bidders, Hong Kong company Suntec Group, proposed to centre the development on a roundabout with a fountain capable of shooting water up to four stories high, with various office buildings and the exhibition and convention centre beside it. Suntec Group ended up winning the contract for the project with a bid of S$201 million (US$150 million) in December 1988.

External media
- Artist's impression of the Fountain of Wealth, along with a map of Suntec City

In the design plan of Suntec City, where the structure is meant to resemble the human hand, the five tower blocks represent the fingers and thumb of a left hand emerging from the ground. Then, the Fountain of Wealth is intended to form a gold ring in the center of the palm of the hand. In February 2003, a crane that was lowering a car, for a publicity event, tipped over and damaged the Fountain of Wealth.

== In popular culture ==
- When The Amazing Race 3, a reality television show, came to Singapore in 2002, contestants collected a clue at the fountain.
  - Similarly, contestants of The Amazing Race Asia 1 also went to the fountain for a clue.
- In the Indian superhero film, Krrish, when Krrish used it as an observation point to locate the position of his Nemesis's helicopter that he is chasing.
- Magician, Cyril Takayama, performed some tricks on the fountain on the first episode of "Cyril : Simply Magic", which was broadcast on AXN Asia, and MediaCorp Channel 5.

== See also ==
- Suntec Singapore International Convention and Exhibition Centre
