= Wild Wadi Water Park =

Outdoor water park in Dubai

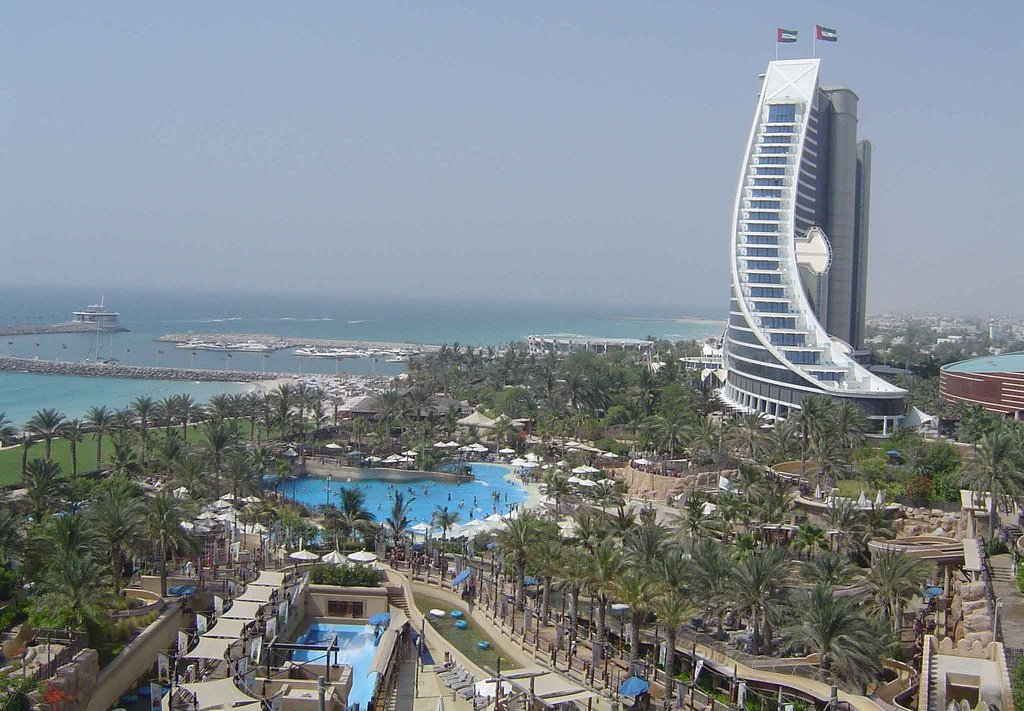
- Aerial view of the park
- Interactive map of Wild Wadi Water Park
- Location: Umm Suqeim Third, Dubai, United Arab Emirates
- Coordinates: 25°08′22″N 55°11′21″E
- Owner: Jumeirah
- Opened: February 12, 1998; 28 years ago
- Pools: 3 pools
- Water slides: 17 water slides
- Website: wildwadi.com/en

The Wild Wadi Water Park is an outdoor water park in Dubai, United Arab Emirates. Situated in the area of Jumeirah, next to the Burj Al Arab and the Jumeirah Beach Hotel, the water park is operated by Jumeirah International, a Dubai-based hotelier.

== Overlook ==
Wild Wadi has a heated/cooled wave pool, multiple water slides and two artificial surfing machines. The park once had the largest water slide outside of North America, but it has since been removed to make space for two other rides. Another feature of the park is an 18 m (59 ft) waterfall that goes off every ten minutes. The water park also has two gift shops, three restaurants and two snack stands.

It was featured in The Amazing Race 5 and The Amazing Race Asia 1, in which teams had to slide down a 21 m (69 ft) drop. It was later featured in The Amazing Race Australia 2, but instead, the teams had to ride the Surf Machine and use boogie boards to surf their way to the end where they got their next clue.

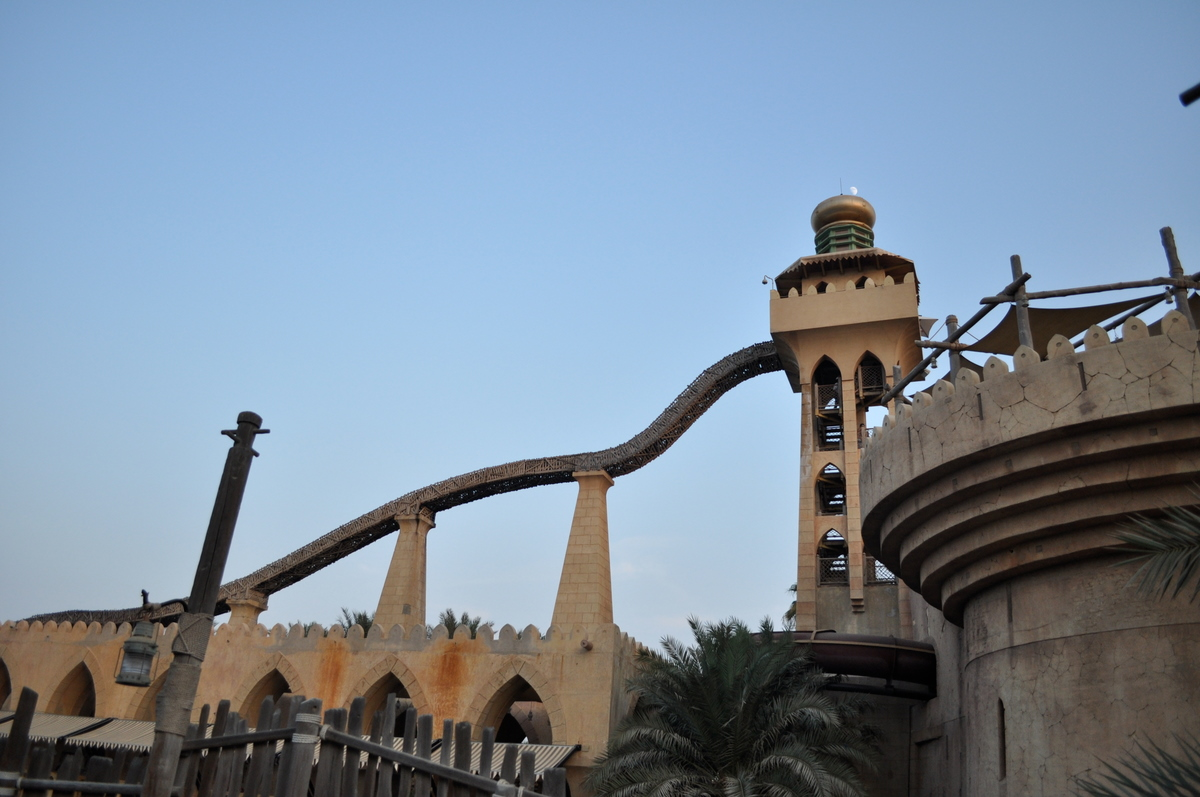
Jumeirah Sceirah

== Rides ==
Slides and lazy river seen from above (2007)

Ring Rides are the traditional downhill slides. Riders can choose to sit in either a single or double ring.

Tantrum Alley & Burj Surj are two new slides that replaced the family rides. Both are the first of their kind in the region. Tantrum Alley is a slide with a combination of 3 tornados & Burj Surj has 2 bowls.

Jumeirah Sceirah is the tallest and fastest free-fall water slide outside of North and South America. Rising to 33 m (108 ft) with riders reaching speeds up to 80 km/h (50 mph).

FlowRider rides, Wipeout and Riptide, are surfing simulators that shoot out more than seven tons of water per second in a thin sheet across moulded foam structures. These rides produce a realistic wave effect which allows riders to body-board, knee-board or surf.

Breakers Bay is the largest wave pool in the Middle East. It produces parallel and crossing 1.5 m (4.9 ft) waves in five different configurations.

Juha's Journey is a 360 m (1,180 ft) long river which allows guest to relax and slowly float around the park.

Juha’s Dhow and Lagoon is Wild Wadi's play area for children and has over 100 water games/rides.

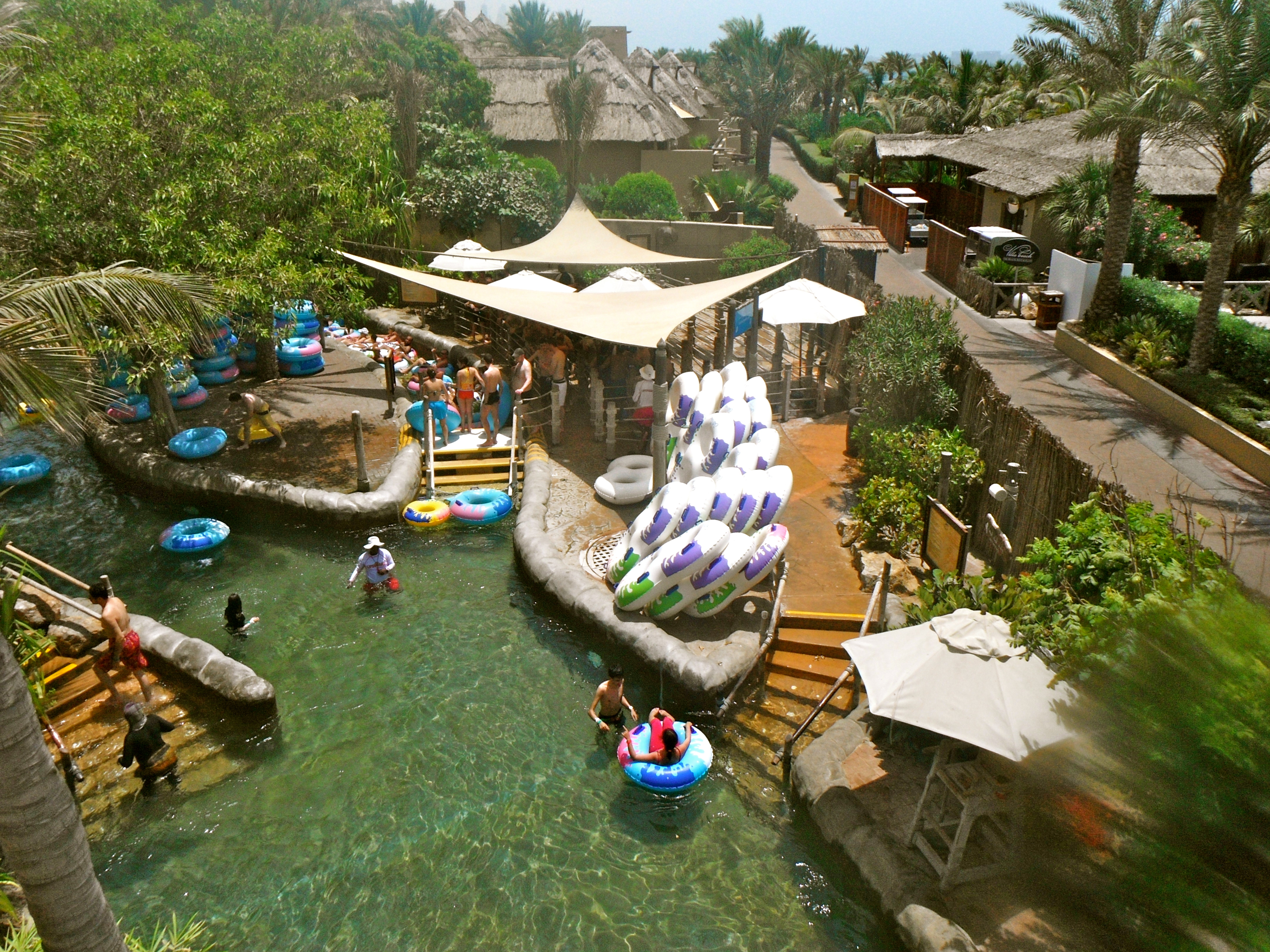
Wild Wadi Water Park

Wipeout AND Riptide have only four of their kind in the world. The Wipeout works by releasing seven tons of water per second in a thin sheet, which is molded by a foam structure. In this way it produces a wave effect which is ideal for body-boarding and knee-boarding.

== Ticketing and Rates ==
The price of tickets in the Wild Wadi water park is based on the height of the person. It is separated into two categories: those above and below 1.1 metres tall. There are discounts on booking tickets in advance from the website. Moreover, children under the age of two are free to enter with proof of age. There are charges for towel and lockers if required.

== See also ==
- List of parks in Dubai
