= Suntec City =

Office skyscraper in Singapore

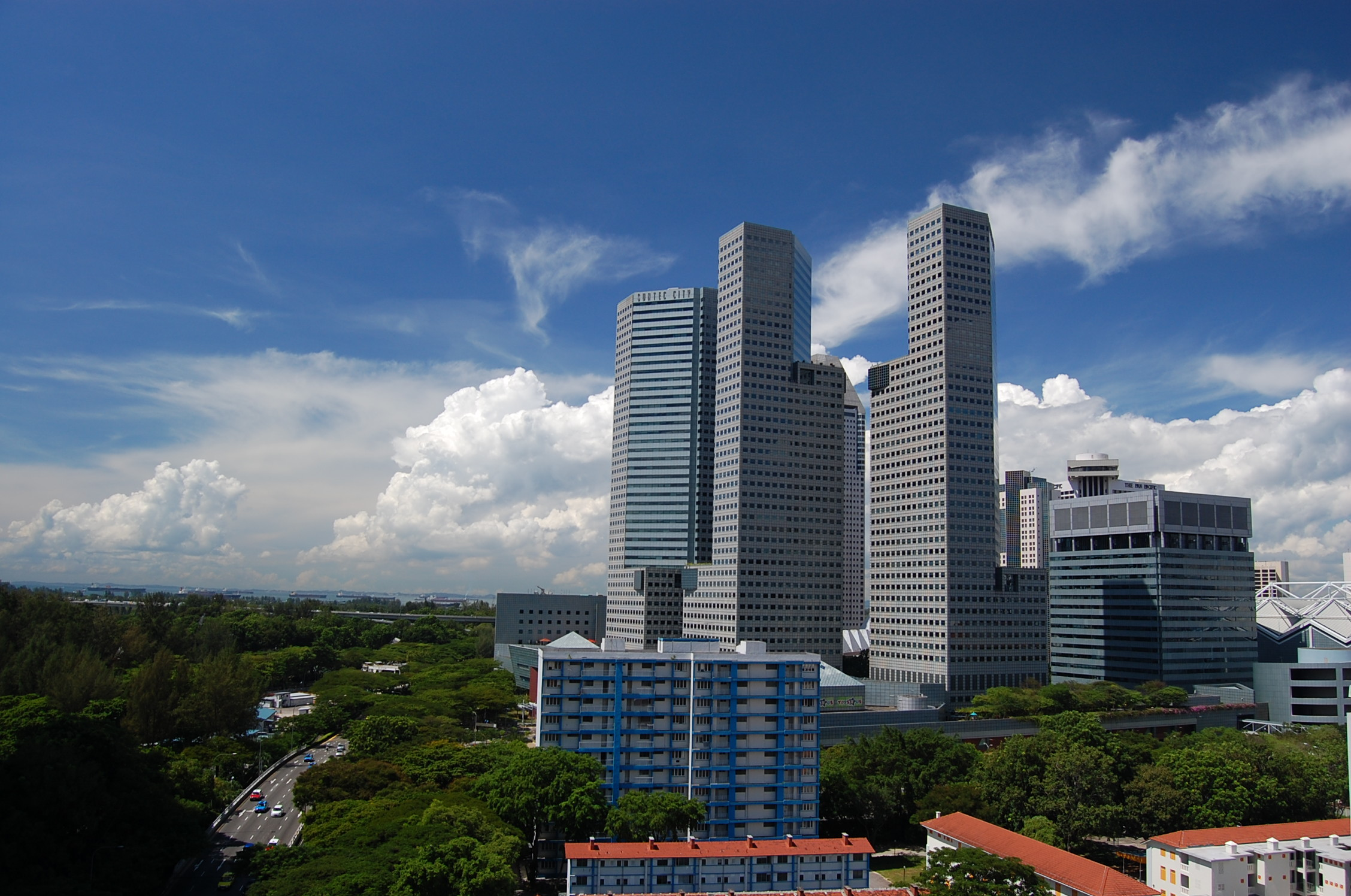
- View of Suntec City

General information
- Status: Completed
- Type: Integrated Development
- Architectural style: Integrated office and retail
- Location: Temasek Boulevard, Marina Centre, Singapore
- Coordinates: 01°17′41″N 103°51′32″E
- Operator: Suntec Real Estate Investment Trust

Technical details
- Floor count: 45

Design and construction
- Architects: Tsao & McKuan Architects

Other information
- Public transit: CC3 Esplanade; CC4 DT15 Promenade

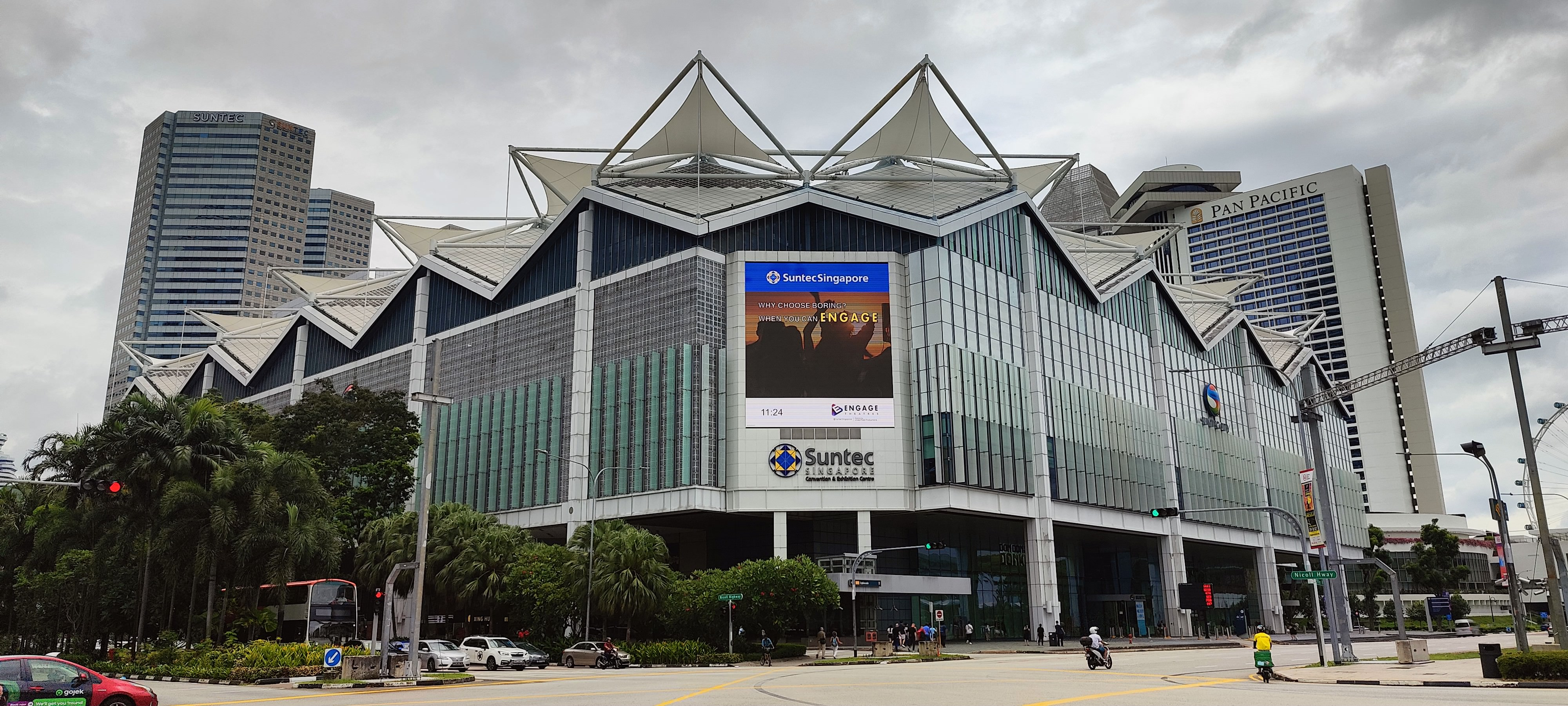
Suntec Singapore International Convention and Exhibition Centre, with the towers in the background

Suntec City is a major mixed-use development located in Marina Centre, a subzone of the Downtown Core in Singapore, which combines a shopping mall, office buildings, and a convention centre. Construction began on 18 January 1992 and was completed on 22 July 1997.

== Design ==
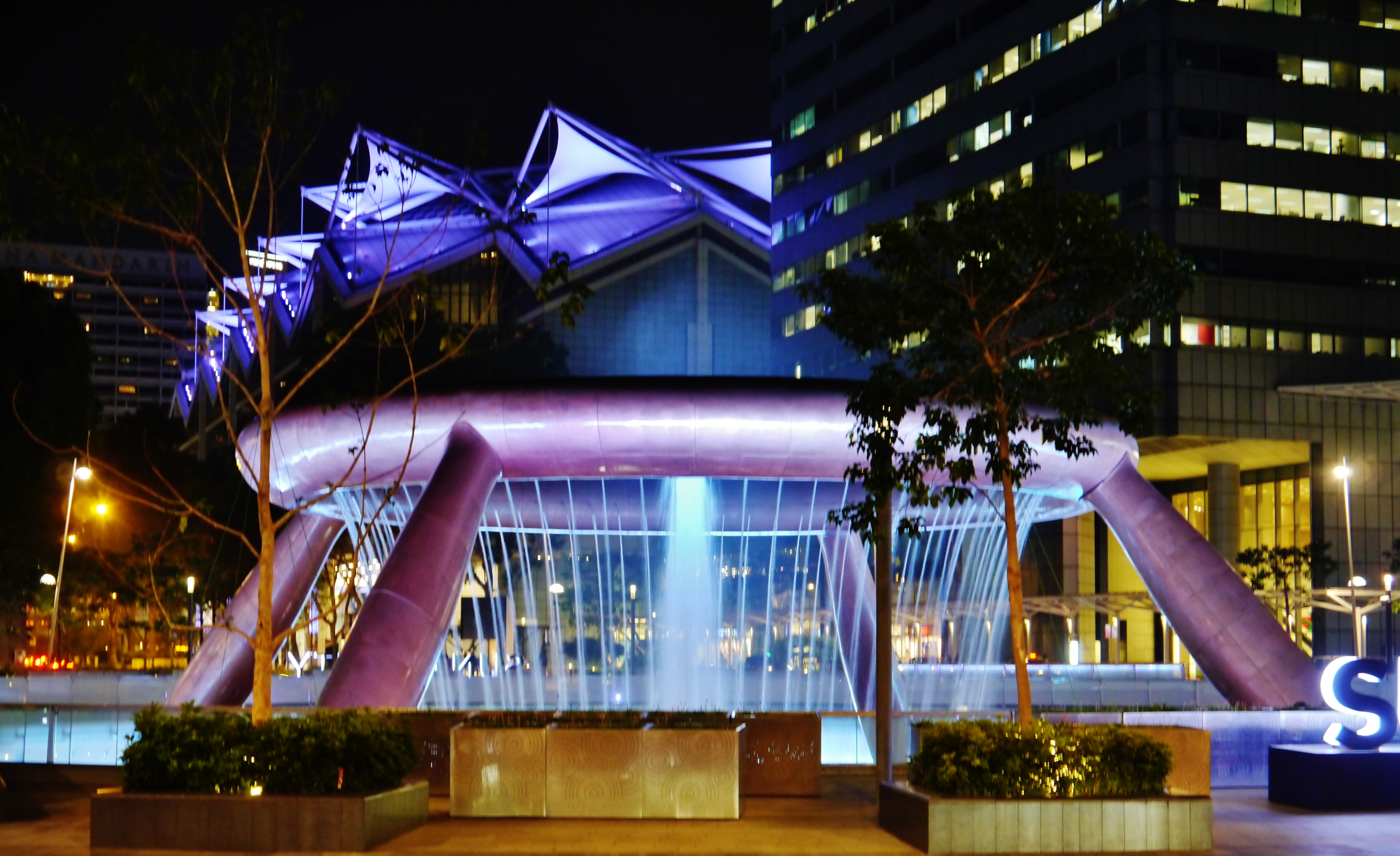
Suntec City Fountain of Wealth.

Suntec City was designed by Tsao & McKown Architects with emphasis on Chinese feng shui. The five buildings and the convention center are arranged such that they resemble a left hand when viewed aerially, with the Fountain of Wealth as its palm. The fountain is made of bronze as the combination of bronze and water symbolizes prosperity. Furthermore, the specially selected Chinese name, 新达, means "new achievement".

== History ==
On 17 December 1987, the Singapore government announced the building of an exhibition and convention centre in Marina Centre. The tender was put up by Urban Redevelopment Authority (URA) and closed on 16 August 1988. Three companies submitted bids for the tender: Suntec City Development Pte Ltd, a joint bid by Kuok Ltd, Shangri-La Hotel, and UOL Investment Holdings, and Sino International Real Estate Agency Ltd. Suntec City Development was headed by Suntec Investment, a Singapore-based investment company formed in 1986, consisting of Hong Kong tycoons such as Run Run Shaw, Li Ka-shing and Frank Tsao. Kuok Ltd was headed by Robert Kuok, a Malaysian billionaire and businessman. Sino International Real Estate Agency was headed by Ng Teng Fong, a Singaporean real estate tycoon.

In December 1988, it was announced that Suntec City Development won the bid and it had to finish constructing the Convention and Exhibition Centre within four and a half years while the remaining office blocks in ten years.

In July 2024, a car fell into the fountain as a result of dangerous driving while the fountain was closed for maintenance. No serious injuries occurred and the man was evacuated to a hospital.

== Areas ==
=== Suntec Convention and Exhibition Centre ===
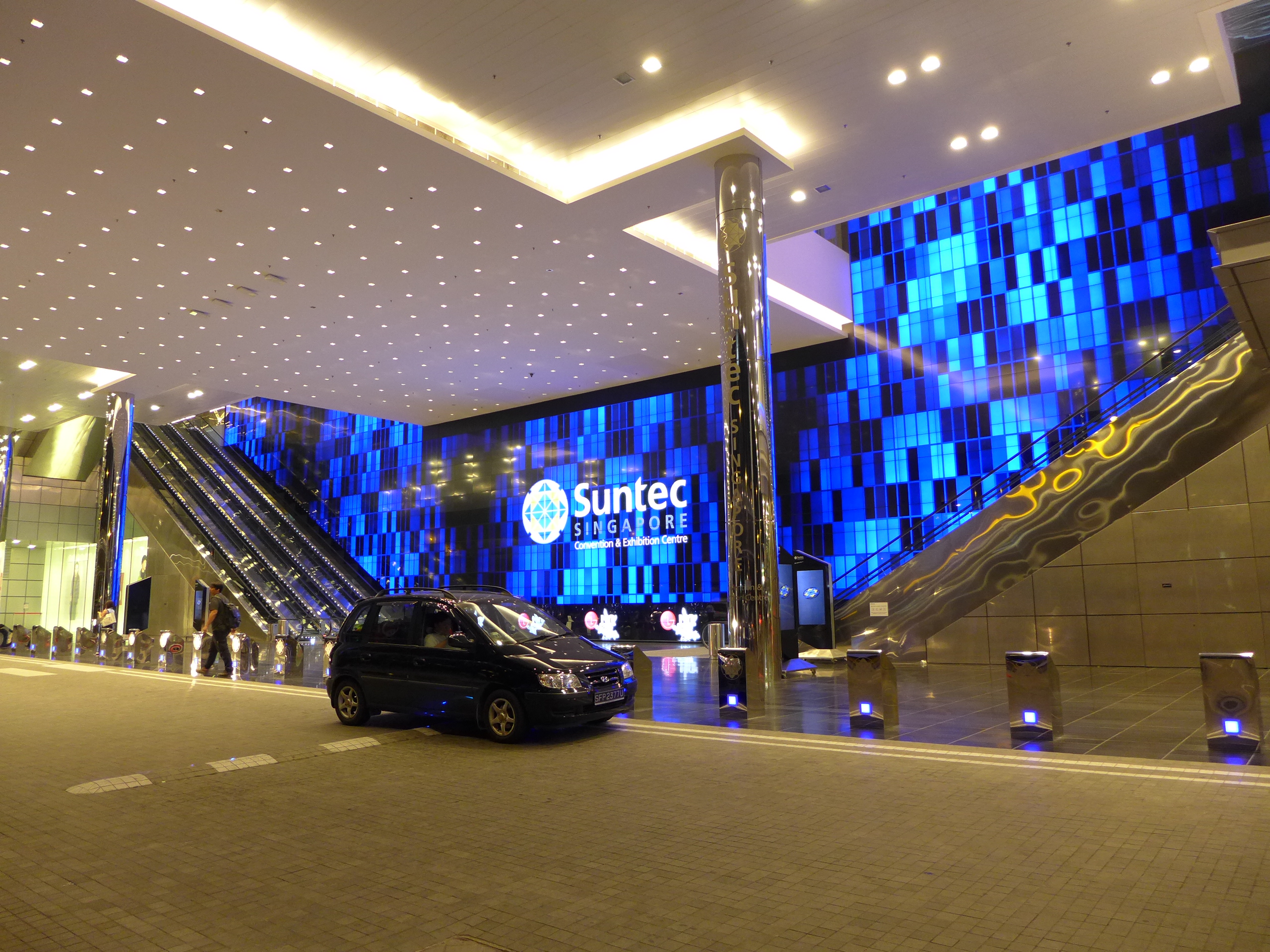
Suntec Singapore International Convention and Exhibition Centre Drop off area

The Singapore International Convention and Exhibition Centre was officially opened on 30 August 1995. In 2004, the convention centre was renamed as Suntec Singapore International Convention and Exhibition Centre as part of a rebranding exercise. The convention centre has a total of 100,000 square metres (1,100,000 sq ft) of space, over multiple levels.

During the 2010 Summer Youth Olympics, the convention centre hosted the boxing, fencing, handball, judo, taekwondo, and wrestling competitions.

The building was renovated from October 2012 to June 2013. The 18th edition of Wikimania was held here from 15 to 19 August 2023.

== Accolades ==
Suntec City was awarded two FIABCI Prix d' Excellence awards for excellence in all aspects of real estate development (Overall winner and Commercial / Retail winner) in 1999. Suntec has claimed other prizes, including the 1998 Tourism Award from the Singapore Tourism Board.

== See also ==
- Fountain of Wealth
- List of convention and exhibition centres
