= Margham =

Village in Dubai, United Arab Emirates

Coordinates: 24°54′N 55°37′E

Margham is an oil and gas field in Dubai, United Arab Emirates (UAE) and the largest onshore gas field in the emirate. The field is managed by Dusup - the Dubai Supply Authority. Condensate production ran at some 25,000 barrels per day in 2010. Margham also has an oil production capability.

== Background ==
Production at Margham commenced in 1984, with three major gas-bearing formations located up to 10,000 feet below sea level. The field is connected by pipeline to Jebel Ali, where the gas condensate is loaded onto tankers for export. Dry gas is now also sent by pipeline to supply the Dubai grid, with consumption increasing since 2015.

Margham was initially developed as a liquids stripping/gas recycling project (dry gas was pumped back into the reservoir), but now operates as a gas storage facility for Dubai since 2008, allowing Dubai to depend on gas produced from Margham for its electricity generation and desalination needs. This usage, together with sustainables such as DEWA's Mohammed bin Rashid Al Maktoum Solar Park, means that Dubai has eliminated the use of oil as a domestic energy fuel.

Although it is a major producer with ambitions to develop its trading activities to become a major global LNG hub, the UAE is actually a net importer of LNG.
