= Nevis Highwire Platform =

Bungee jumping platform

Coordinates: 45°03′48.18″S 169°01′45.60″E

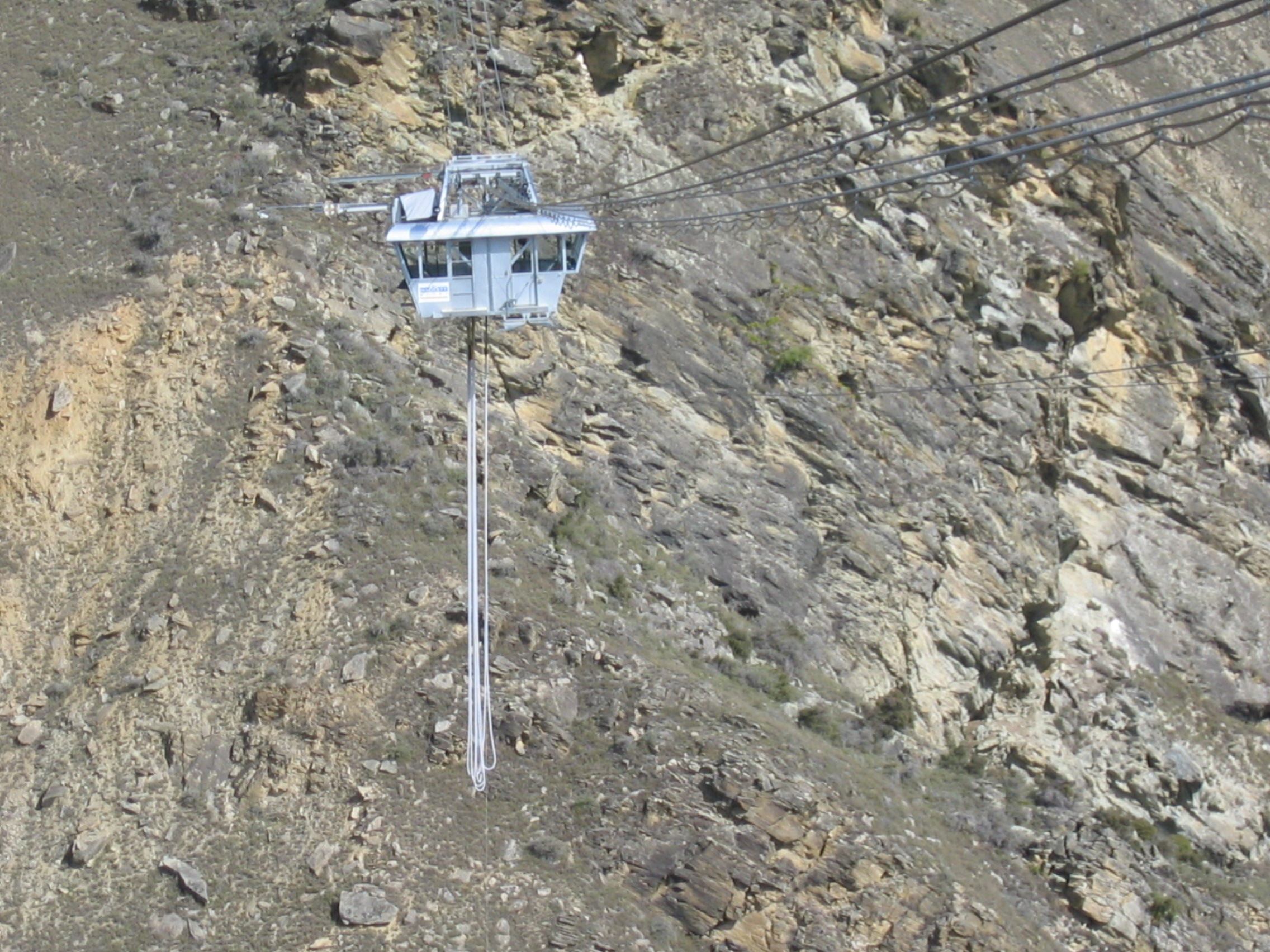
Nevis Bungy

The Nevis Bungy is a bungee jumping platform in the Southern Alps near Queenstown in New Zealand's South Island. It has a height of 134 metres. It is suspended by high-tension cords, which are fixed at both ends on either side of the Nevis River valley. Its glass floor allows spectators to watch others jump. This makes it a main tourist attraction for those visiting Queenstown.

== The jump ==
T-shirt awarded to the jumpers

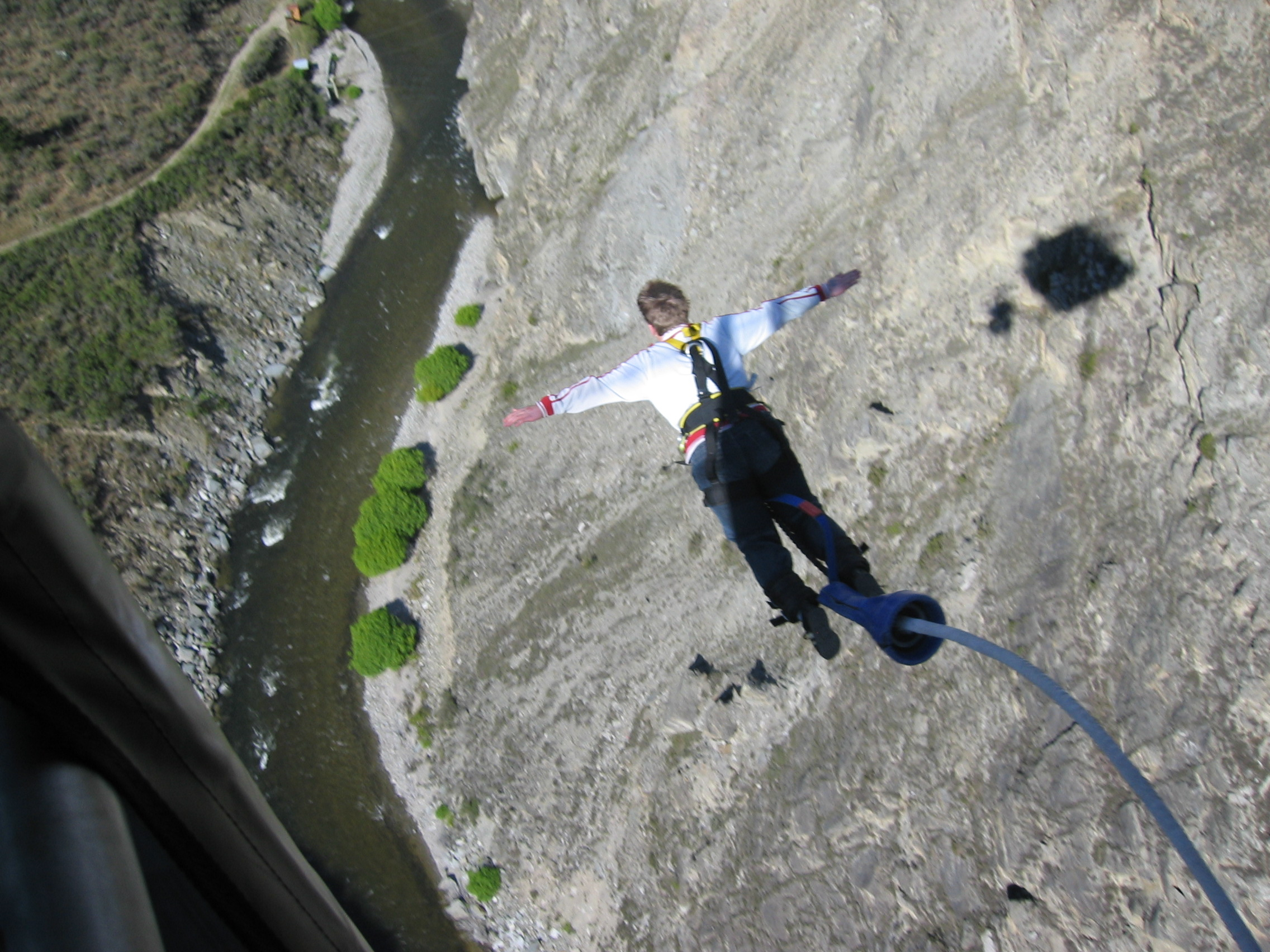
Jump from Nevis Highwire Platform

Bungee jumpers usually fall at speeds of over 128 km/h (36 m/s), and the duration of the initial jump (until the tension in the cord pulls you back up for the first time) is about 8 seconds. The second fall is larger than the world's first commercial bungee jump off Kawarau Gorge Suspension Bridge.

== Location and access ==
The site cannot be accessed by any personal vehicles and may only be reached by taking the shuttle from downtown Queenstown at the company's store located at The Station. It is approximately a 40-minute ride along winding mountain roads to reach the site. Location on map 45°03'46.6"S 169°01'43.4"E
