= Railay Beach =

Beach in Krabi province, Thailand

Coordinates: 8°0′38″N 98°50′22″E

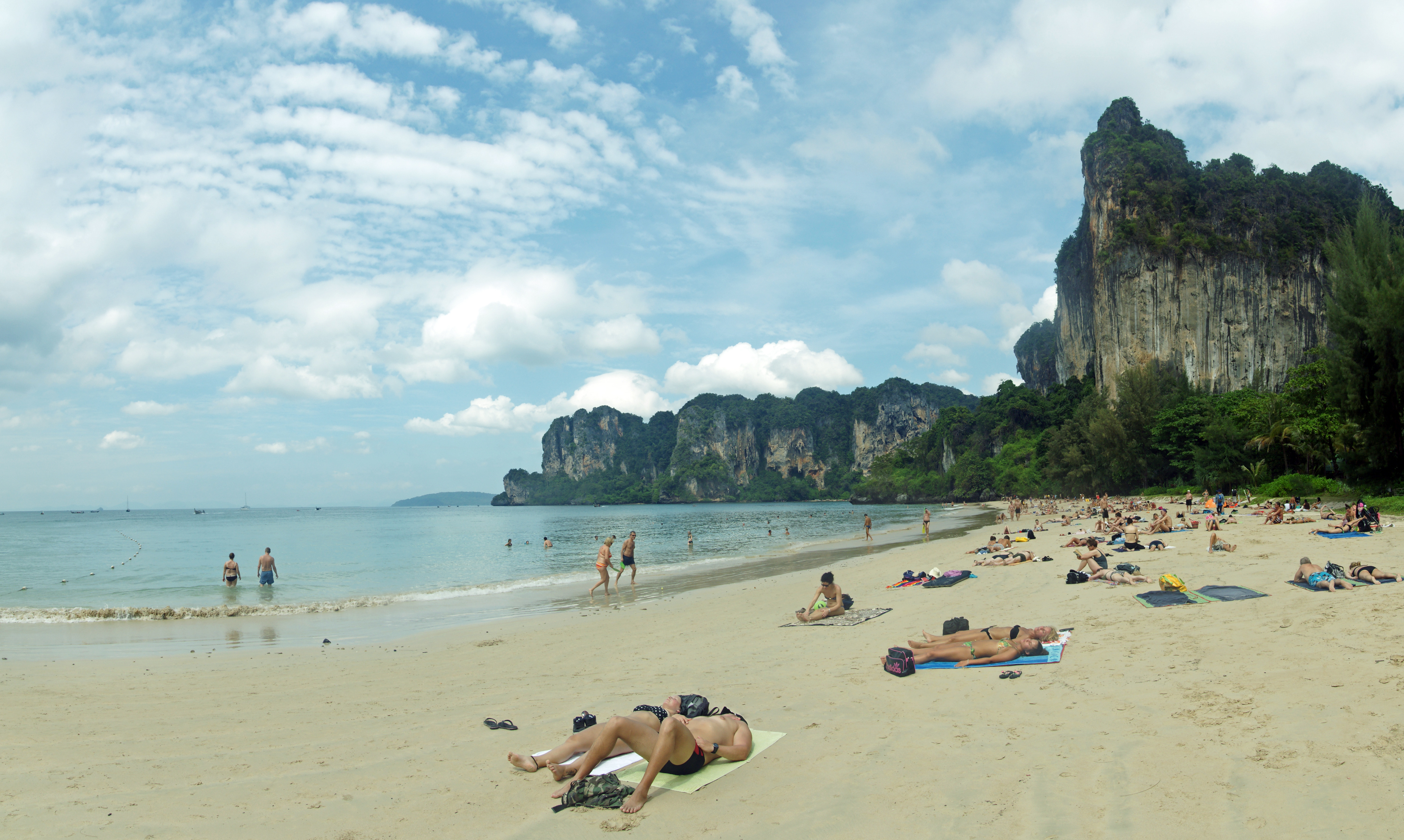
Railay, a peninsula between the town of Krabi and Ao Nang.

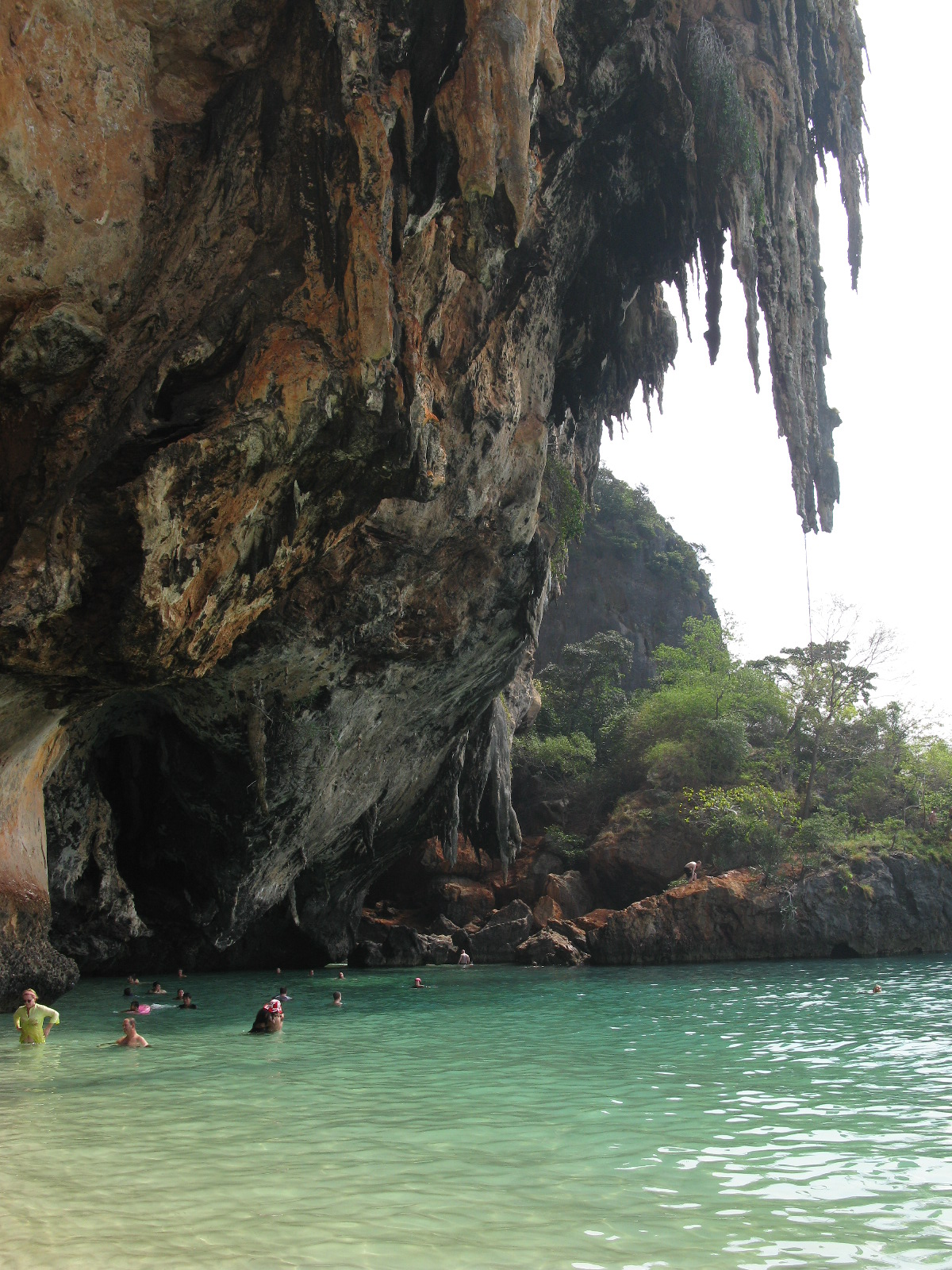
Railay West Beach - 2010

Railay (Thai: ไร่เลย์, pronounced [râj lēː]), also known as Rai Leh, is a small peninsula between the city of Krabi and Ao Nang in Thailand. It is accessible only by boat due to high limestone cliffs cutting off mainland access. These cliffs attract rock climbers from all over the world, but the area is also popular due to its beautiful beaches and quiet relaxing atmosphere. Accommodation ranges from bungalows and medium-priced resorts in East Railay to a collection of luxury resorts focused on West Railay, though one, Rayavadee, spans both waterfronts and also has a beachfront restaurant at Ao Phra Nang. The four main areas of Railay consist of Phra Nang, West Railay, East Railay, and Ton Sai. Ton Sai caters to climbers and the backpacker set and is more rustic than the glitz of West Railay and the shops and restaurants of the East Railay boardwalk.

Railay beach was not severely affected by the tsunami of 26 December 2004.

== History ==
Tourism started its development in Railay during the 1970s when backpackers and hippies visited the area. Since then, it has been the most popular destination in Krabi due to its beaches.

== East Railay ==
East Railay Beach is the docking point for boats arriving from Krabi. East Beach is primarily covered in dense mangroves and is unsuitable for swimming. At the northern end of the waterfront, there is a commercial area along a boardwalk/promenade with many restaurants and bars and various services including a Muay Thai school, and lower-priced resorts than in West Railay. Above, on the trail that leads to Ton Sai, is the Diamond Cave, which features a walkway into its depths. At the southern end of the boardwalk, there is access to a public trail that meanders under overhanging limestone cliffs and provides access to Phra Nang Beach.

== West Railay ==
West Railay Beach, connected to the east side by paths through the large resorts or by trails through thin jungle cover, is the primary destination for beach-goers in Railay. The beach is flanked by high limestone cliffs on either side. Long-tail boats are available to hire for transport to Ao Nang, 15 minutes north of Railay. In addition, ferries departing Railay for Ko Phi Phi and points west including Phuket depart from the West beach. The focal point of West Railay Beach is a short promenade (walking street) lined with restaurants and shops.

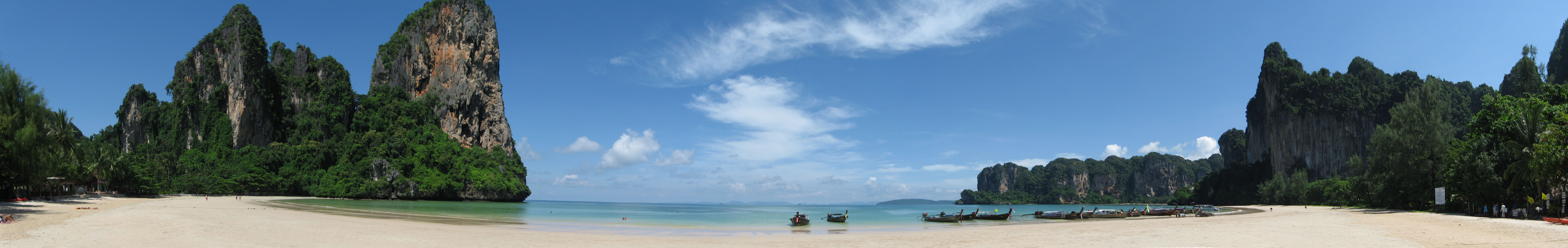
West Railay Beach.

== Gallery ==
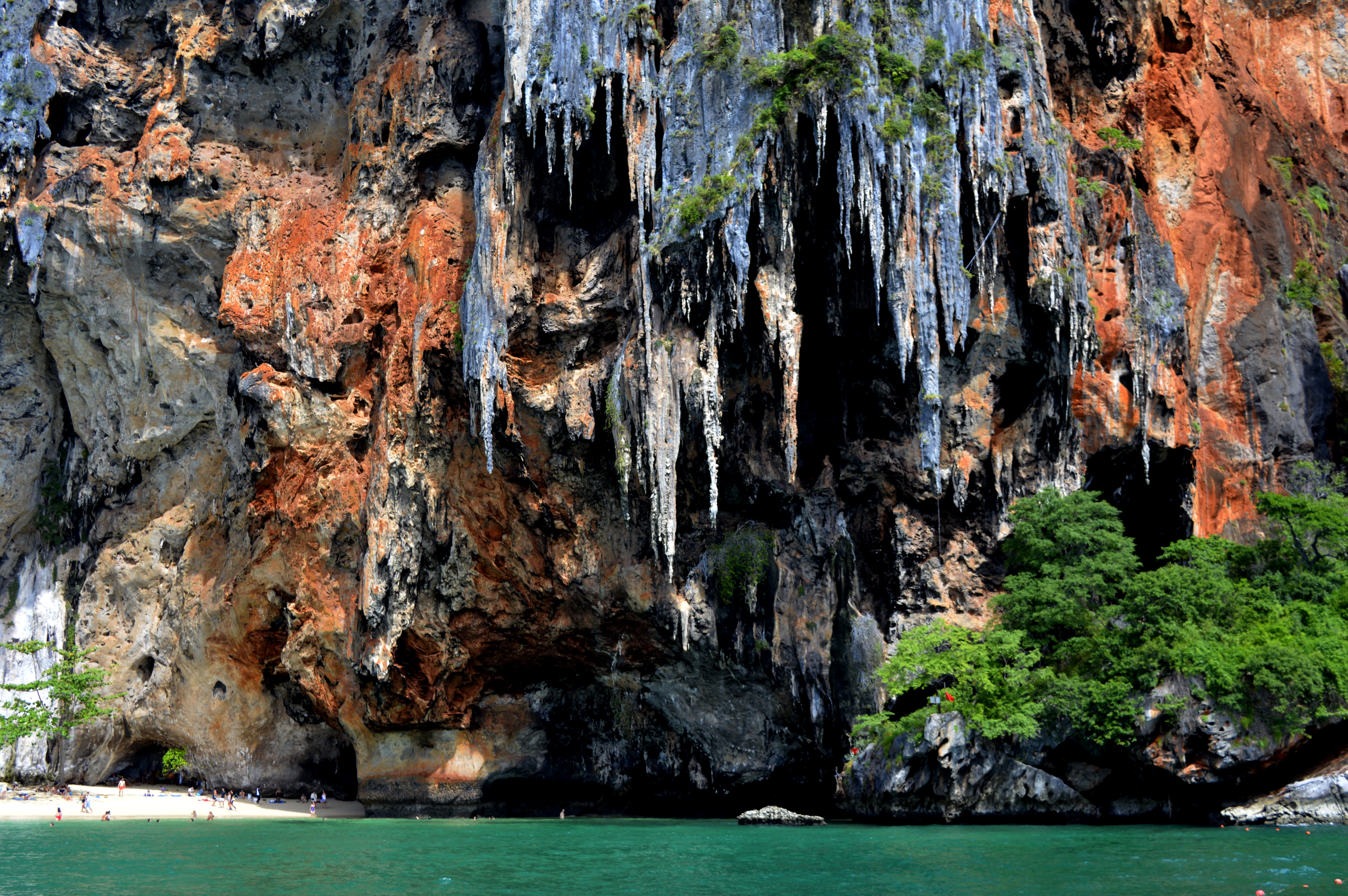
Railay Beach Limestone Cliffs
