= The Amazing Race Asia 2 =

Season of television series

- Season 2
- The Amazing Race Asia logo for season 2
- Presented by: Allan Wu
- No. of teams: 10
- Winners: Adrian Yap & Collin Low
- No. of legs: 12
- Distance traveled: 51,534 km (32,022 mi)
- No. of episodes: 13 (15 including racers revealed & recap)

Release
- Original network: AXN Asia
- Original release: 22 November 2007 – 14 February 2008

Additional information
- Filming dates: 5 July – 28 July 2007

Series chronology
- ← Previous; Season 1 Next → Season 3

The Amazing Race Asia 2 is the second season of The Amazing Race Asia, an Asian reality competition show based on the American series The Amazing Race. It featured ten teams of two with a pre-existing relationship, in a race around the world to win US$100,000. Hosted by Allan Wu, it featured ten teams of two, each with a pre-existing relationship, in a race around the Eastern Hemisphere to win US$100,000. This season visited four continents and ten countries and travelled over 51,534 kilometres (32,022 mi) during twelve legs. Starting in Singapore, teams travelled through the Philippines, Hong Kong, New Zealand, Japan, South Korea, Germany, the Czech Republic, Hungary, and South Africa before finishing in Singapore.

This season premiered on AXN Asia on 22 November 2007 at 9:00 p.m. (UTC+8) and ended on 14 February 2008 at 9:00 p.m. (UTC+8).

Singaporean gym buddies Adrian Yap and Collin Low were the winners of this season. Adrian Yap was the first contestant with a disability to participate & win any edition of The Amazing Race, while Malaysian sisters Pamela and Vanessa Chong finished in second place and Philippine best friends and expats Marc Nelson and Rovilson Fernandez finished in third place.

== Production ==
=== Development and filming ===
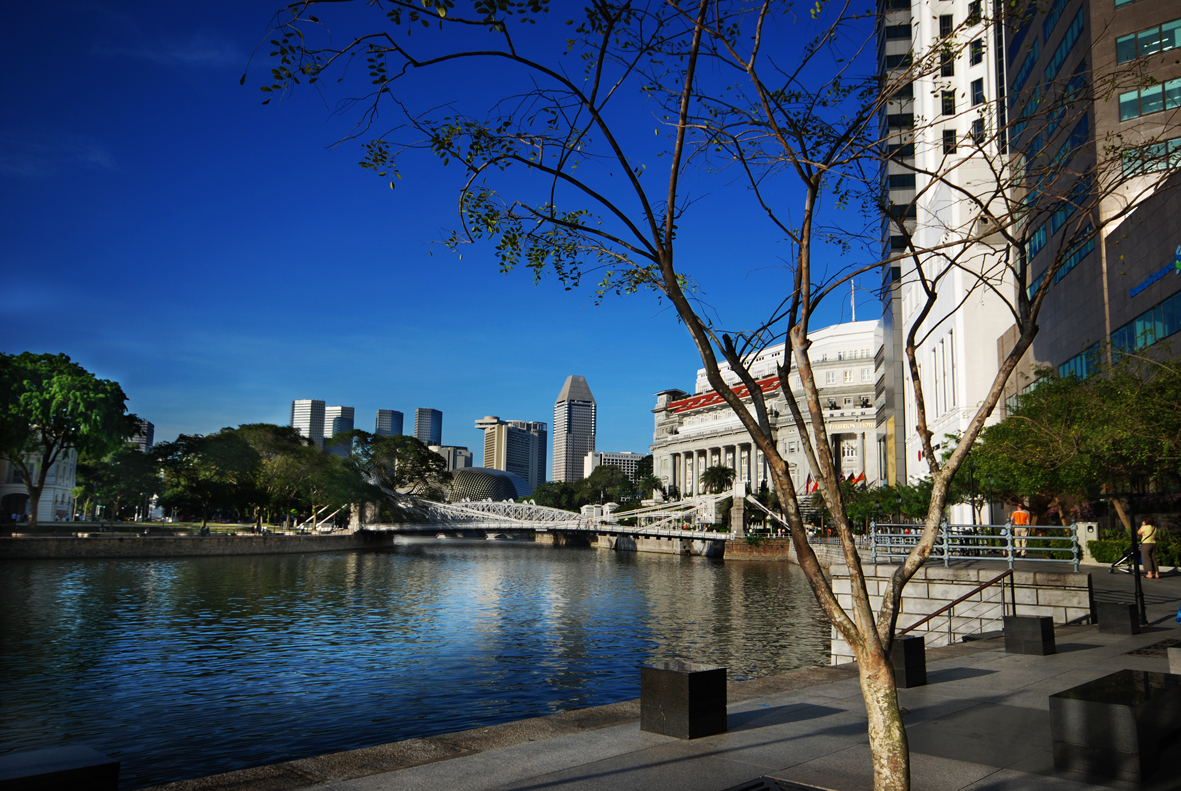
The Starting Line for The Amazing Race Asia 2 was located near mouth of the Singapore River.

The second season of The Amazing Race Asia covered 50,000 kilometres (31,000 mi) (the longest route to date of The Amazing Race Asia) in 24 days racing across 4 continents, including the first time an Amazing Race franchise visited the Czech Republic, a nation that had not been visited by the original version at the time of air (the nation would later be visited in the 15th season, in 2009). The show adopted newer rules from the original American version, such as the non-elimination penalty where the team who checked in last must make it to first place in the next leg or else incur the 30 minute penalty. It was also noted that the production of this season had run into the production of The Amazing Race 12 in an unknown airport. Production made the show more competitive by imposing more self-driving and reducing the chance of teams being bunched up on the same airplane flight.

This season had two different penalties for coming in last on a non-elimination leg. Edwin & Monica were marked for elimination for coming in last on the first leg, and Henry & Terri were stripped of all their money and had to begin the next leg with no money after coming in last on the seventh leg. Racers were not told that the original non-elimination penalty was still applicable. This twist led to an argument between Henry and host Allan Wu at the Seoul Pit Stop, when the former was unwilling to give up his team's money. In the following leg, the penalty reverted to the "marked for elimination" penalty after Terri & Henry finished last consecutively.

=== Marketing ===
The second season of the show had six official sponsors: Aviva, Caltex, Nokia Nseries, Sony Electronics Asia Pacific, Bintan Lagoon Resort, and Standard Chartered Bank. The sponsors played a major role in the series by providing prizes and integrating their products into various tasks.

=== Casting ===
This season featured 10 teams chosen from 2500 applicants, including racers from the original American series. Final applications were accepted 13 April 2007 (two weeks after the original deadline). This season was also open to the Japanese, who were ineligible for Season 1. Final interviews were held sometime in April or May 2007. Filming took place sometime in June or July 2007.

=== Broadcasting ===
Two special episodes acted as bookends for this season; the first subtitled "Racers Revealed" was shown three weeks before the season premiere while the second, "Memories" aired one week after the season finale. The former contained racer introductions and production insight into the casting process. The latter featured the racers sharing their favorite memories and highlights of the season, similar to that of Season 1.

== Cast ==
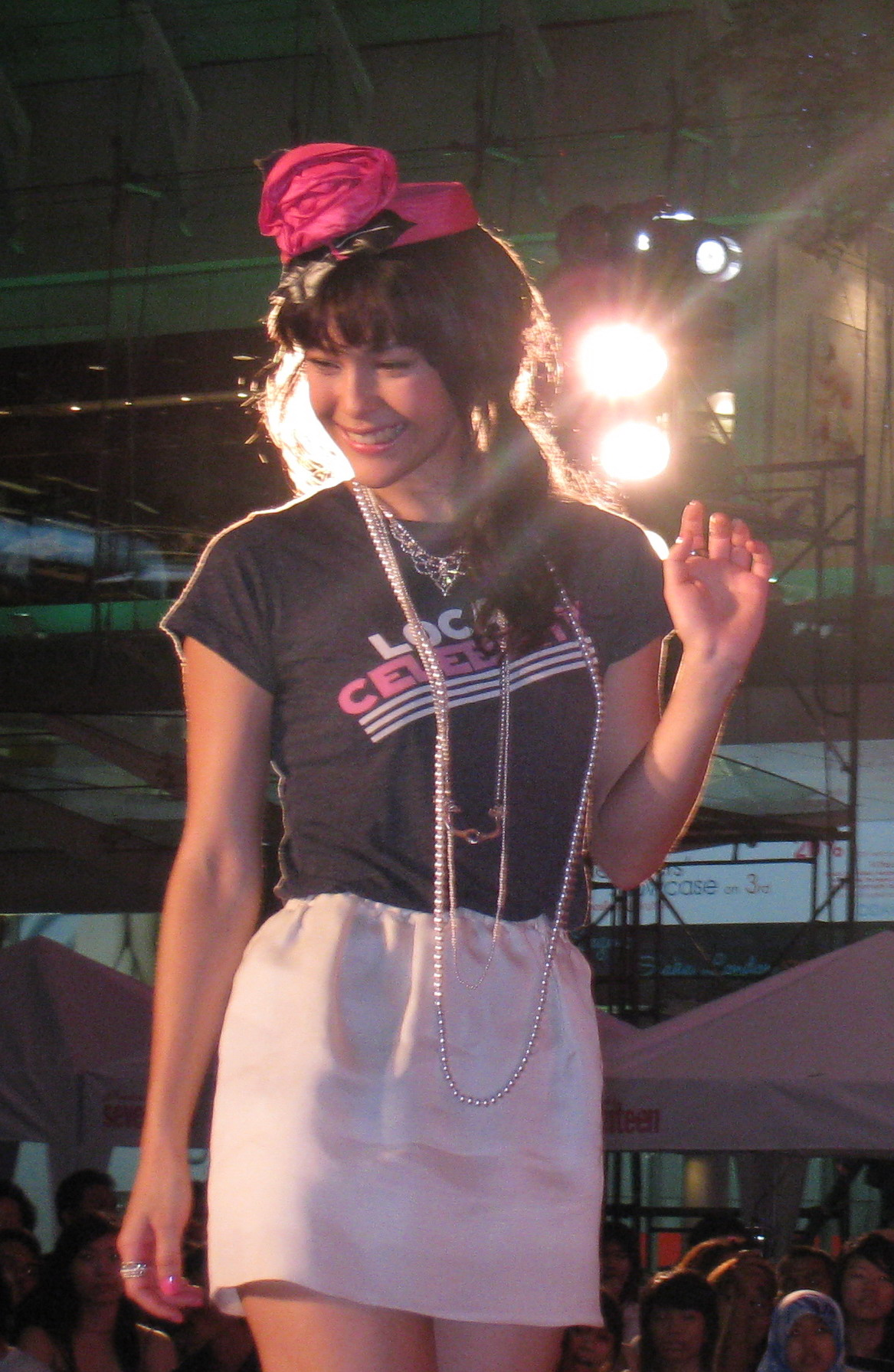
Paula Taylor

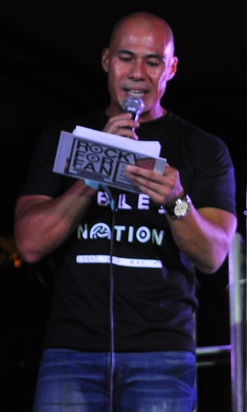
Rovilson Fernandez

This season's cast included reunited siblings, childhood friends, and dating couples. Notably, Adrian is the first hearing-impaired contestant in Amazing Race history. It also featured a large number of local media personalities or their relatives. Monica Lo represented Toronto, Ontario, Canada and won the 1997 Miss Chinese International Pageant, while Paula Taylor is a Channel [V] VJ. Vanessa & Pamela are the sisters of famous Malaysian singer Vince Chong. Kinaryosih is a famous Indonesian movie actress and model, who has also won a Citra Award for Best Supporting Actress in 2006. Sophie is a filmmaker for the Discovery Channel, as well as a correspondent for the Asian Film Festival. Marc Saw Nelson is a model and host of the Philippine sports show Sports Unlimited, while Rovilson Fernandez is a host for another similar show, Gameplan and an editor for Maxim Philippines.

This season features three non-Asians. One is Henry, a former US Navy Petty Officer, who raced with his Filipina wife Trinidad (better known as Terri). The other is Aurelia, a Frenchwoman residing in Hong Kong who raced with her Singaporean ex-housemate Sophie, while Brett is of Australian nationality.

Henry Reed died on May 21, 2013, at the age of 53.

Marc & Rovilson became the first team to win eight legs in a season, which was a record set for winning the most legs in a single season, and would later be matched by the winning team Rachel & Dave of twentieth season of the original American version, and Tom & Tyler and Ashleigh & Amanda respectively from the fourth and fifth seasons of the Australian version.

Contestants	Age	Relationship	Hometown	Status
Edwin Lo	26	Dating 10 Years	Hong Kong, China	Eliminated 1st (in Manila, Philippines)
Monica Lo	28	Dating 10 Years	Hong Kong, China	Eliminated 1st (in Manila, Philippines)
Kinaryosih	28	Dating 2 Years	Jakarta, Indonesia	Eliminated 2nd (in Karaka, New Zealand)
Brett Money	26	Dating 2 Years	Jakarta, Indonesia	Eliminated 2nd (in Karaka, New Zealand)
Sophie Teng	27	Ex-Housemates	Hong Kong, China	Eliminated 3rd (in Rotorua, New Zealand)
Aurelia Chenat	27	Ex-Housemates	Hong Kong, China	Eliminated 3rd (in Rotorua, New Zealand)
Daichi Kawashima	27	Brother & Sister	Tokyo, Japan	Eliminated 4th (in Busan, South Korea)
Sawaka Kawashima	28	Brother & Sister	Tokyo, Japan	Eliminated 4th (in Busan, South Korea)
Terri Reed	44	Married 13 Years	Manila, Philippines	Eliminated 5th (in Prague, Czech Republic)
Henry Reed	48	Married 13 Years	Manila, Philippines	Eliminated 5th (in Prague, Czech Republic)
Natasha Monks	24	Childhood Friends	Bangkok, Thailand	Eliminated 6th (in Budapest, Hungary)
Paula Taylor	24	Childhood Friends	Bangkok, Thailand	Eliminated 6th (in Budapest, Hungary)
Diane Douglas	33	Dancing Mums	Kuala Lumpur, Malaysia	Eliminated 7th (in Touws River, South Africa)
Ann Tan	40	Dancing Mums	Kuala Lumpur, Malaysia	Eliminated 7th (in Touws River, South Africa)
Marc Nelson	31	Best Friends	Manila, Philippines	Third Place
Rovilson Fernandez	30	Best Friends	Dagupan, Philippines	Third Place
Vanessa Chong	29	Sisters	Kuala Lumpur, Malaysia	Second Place
Pamela Chong	24	Sisters	Kuala Lumpur, Malaysia	Second Place
Adrian Yap	27	Gym Buddies	Singapore	Winners
Collin Low	35	Gym Buddies	Singapore	Winners

=== Future appearances ===
Paula Taylor appeared on the first leg of The Amazing Race Asia 3 as a Pit Stop greeter in Chiang Mai.

== Results ==
The following teams participated in the season, with their relationships at the time of filming. Placements are listed in finishing order.

- A red placement with a dagger (†) indicates that the team was eliminated.
- A blue placement with a double-dagger (‡) indicates that the team was the last to arrive at a Pit Stop in a non-elimination leg.
  - An underlined blue placement indicates that the team was marked for elimination; if the team did not place 1st in the next leg, they would receive a 30-minute penalty.
  - An italicised blue placement indicates that the team had to relinquish all of their money and were not allotted money for the next leg.
- Italicised results indicate the position of the team at the midpoint of a two-episode leg.
- A green ƒ indicates that the team won a Fast Forward.
- A violet + indicates that the teams encountered an Intersection.
- A brown > indicates that the team chose to use the Yield, and a brown < indicates the team who received it.

Team placement (by leg)
Team	1	2	3	4	5a (Note: Leg 5 is a double leg, which had two Detours and two Roadblocks shown over two episodes. The placements listed for the first half are in order of teams' arrival at the Pit Stop in Fukuoka.)	5b	6	7	8+ (Note: This leg featured an Intersection. The teams were paired up thusly: Adrian & Collin and Marc & Rovilson, Vanessa & Pamela and Ann & Diane, and Paula & Natasha and Terri & Henry.)	9	10	11	12
Adrian & Collin	7th	5th	2nd	2nd	3rd	2nd	2nd	2nd	2nd	1st (Note: Adrian & Collin and Vanessa & Pamela initially arrived 1st and 3rd, respectively, but they did not park their vehicles at the designated parking zones and entered through the wrong gates, and they were told to backtrack and correct those mistakes. This did not affect either teams' placements.)	1stƒ (Note: This team won the Fast Forward in this particular leg)	2nd	1st
Vanessa & Pamela	1st	4th	7th	6th (Note: For unknown reasons on the subsequent leg, the starting placements of Terri & Henry and Vanessa & Pamela were switched, resulting in Terri & Henry and Vanessa & Pamela starting in 6th and 7th place, respectively.)	7th	4th	3rd	5th	4th	3rd	3rd	3rd	2nd
Marc & Rovilson	2nd	1st	1st	1st	2nd	1st	1st	1st	1st	2nd	2nd> (Note: Marc & Rovilson used the Yield against Ann & Diane)	1st	3rd
Ann & Diane	3rd	3rd	3rd	4th	1st	6th	4th (Note: For unknown reasons on the subsequent leg, the starting placements of Paula & Natasha and Ann & Diane were switched, resulting in Paula & Natasha and Ann & Diane starting in 4th and 5th place, respectively.)	3rd	3rd	4th	4th<	4th†	
Paula & Natasha	6th	2nd	4th	3rd	4th	5th	5th	4th	5th	5th‡	5th† (Note: This team had been marked for elimination. However, since this team checked-in at the Pit Stop last, they were eliminated without being issued the 30-minute penalty.)		
Terri & Henry	9th	9th	5th	7th	6th	3rd	6th‡	6th‡	6th†				
Daichi & Sawaka	8th	8th	6th	5th	5th	7th†							
Sophie & Aurelia	5th	7th	8th	8th†									
Brett & Kinaryosih	4th	6th	9th†										
Edwin & Monica	10th‡	10th†											

== Race summary ==
Complete Route Map

Destinations	Air travel Rail travel Water travel Bus travel Helicopter travel Bicycle travel Gondola travel
Route Markers	Detour Roadblock Fast Forward Yield Intersection Pit Stop

=== Leg 1 (Singapore → Philippines) ===
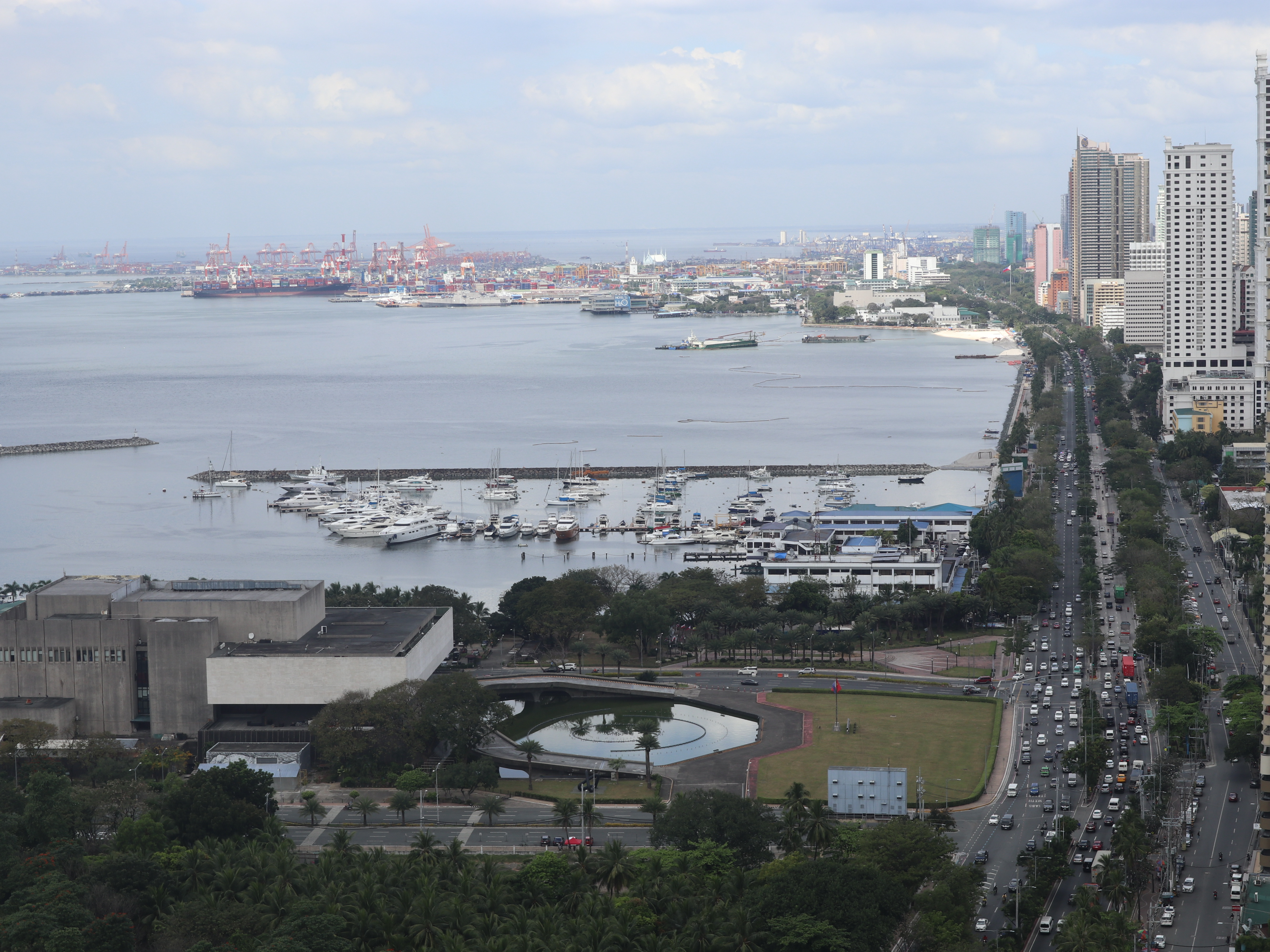
Upon arriving in The Philippines, teams headed to the ASEAN Promenade Park in Manila's CCP Complex to find their next clue.

- Episode 1: "I'm A Box of Chocolate" (22 November 2007)
- Prize: Nokia N95 and N73 mobile phones, one for each team member (awarded to Vanessa & Pamela)

Locations

- Singapore (Singapore River Mouth) (Starting Line)
- Singapore (Asian Civilisations Museum)
- Singapore (Mount Faber – Merlion Statue)
- Singapore (Suntec City – Suntec Towers)
- Singapore (Changi Airport) → Manila, Philippines (Ninoy Aquino International Airport)
- Pasay (CCP Complex – ASEAN Promenade Park)
- Manila (Plaza Miranda)
- Manila (Intramuros – Fort Santiago)

Episode summary

- Teams set off from the Mouth of Singapore River. Once there, they had received a postcard that depicted one of Singapore's many national icons and had to search for a specific taxi cab near the Asian Civilisations Museum with the souvenir from their postcard to receive their next clue from the taxi driver, directing them to Mount Faber. Atop of that, teams picked up a Nokia N95 phone and used its GPS system to guide their taxi driver to their next location: Suntec City for their next clue.
- This season's first Detour was a choice between Dare or Stair. In Dare, teams had to take an elevator to the 45th-storey of Suntec Tower 3 and then Tyrolean traverse across to the adjacent Tower 4 while suspended 181 metres (594 ft) above the ground before receiving their next clue. In Stair, teams would have had to climb up 45 floors to the rooftop of Tower 3, and then would have had to descend and head to Tower 4 and again climb up 45 floors before receiving their next clue. All teams chose Dare.
- After the Detour, teams were instructed to fly to Manila, Philippines. Once there, they must travel to ASEAN Promenade Park on CCP Complex for their next clue, heading them to Plaza Miranda, where they had to eat eight pieces of fresh balut from a bowl before receiving their next clue from the egg seller, directing them to the Pit Stop: Fort Santiago.

Additional note

- This leg was a non-elimination leg.

=== Leg 2 (Philippines) ===
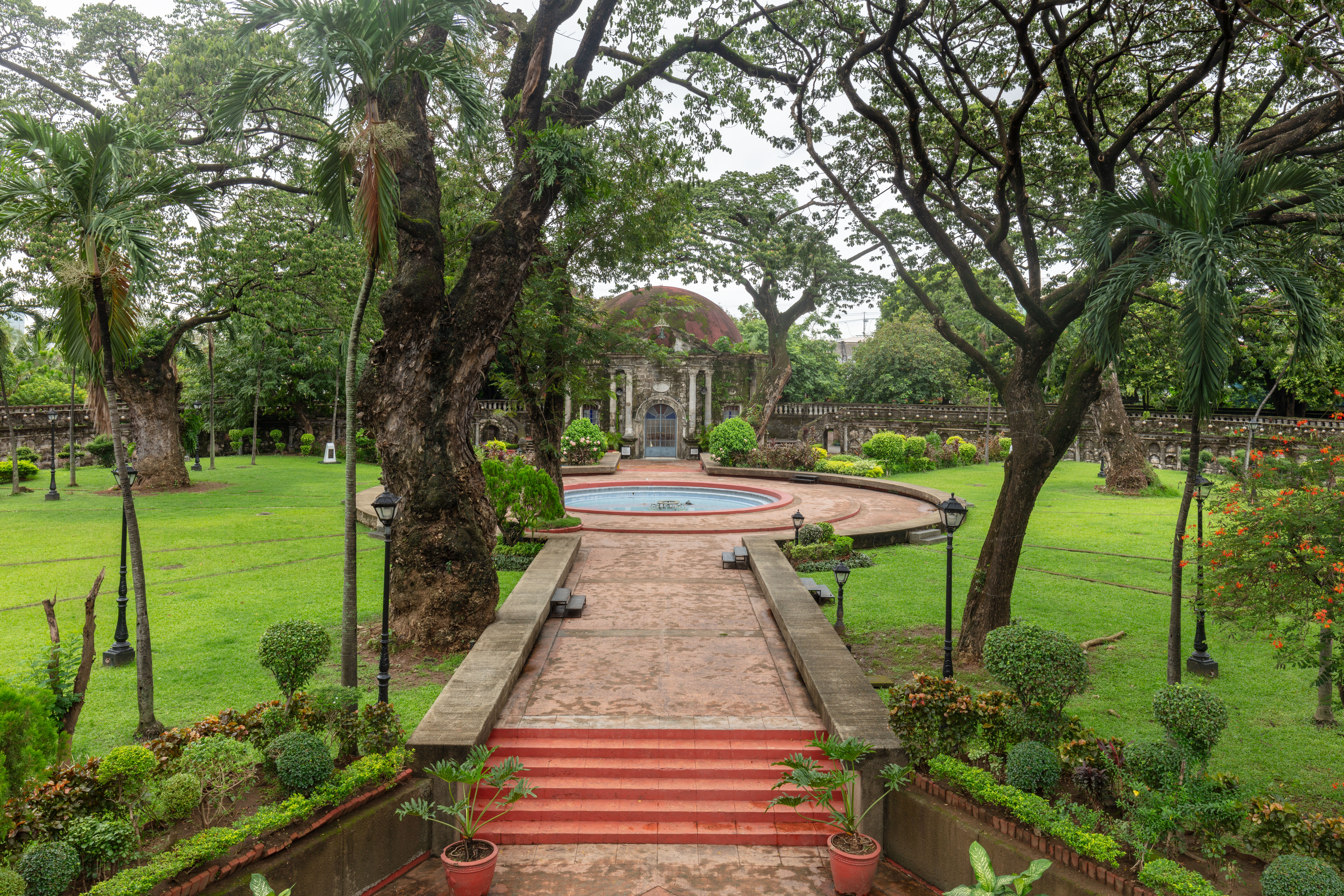
Teams finished this leg of the race at the historic Paco Park & Cemetery in Downtown Manila.

- Episode 2: "This is the Fun Bus" (29 November 2007)
- Prize: US$5,000 credit card issued by Standard Chartered Bank for each team member (awarded to Marc & Rovilson)
- Eliminated: Edwin & Monica

Locations

- Manila (Intramuros – Fort Santiago)
- Pasay (Green Star Bus Terminal) → Pila (Pila Municipal Center)
- Pila (Rivera Street Rice Paddy Field)
- Manila (President Quirino Avenue – Caltex Star Mart)
- Manila (Ermita Church – Nuestra Señora de Guía Children's Center)
- Manila (Carriedo Station)
- Manila (Paco Park & Cemetery)

Episode summary

- At the start of the leg, teams were instructed to travel to Green Star Bus Terminal to catch a bus to Pila and disembarked at Pila Municipal Center for their next clue.
- In this season's first Roadblock, one team member had to choose a carabao and then lead it to plough a muddy rice paddy in a slalom pattern past a series of posts with Amazing Race before returning to the start to receive their next clue. Team members were taught beforehand some common vocal commands to help control their carabao but had to start over if they asked for help.
- After the Roadblock, teams must head back to Manila and find the Caltex Star Mart at President Quirino Avenue, where they had to load four boxes of donations into a marked jeepney. Teams then had to ride in the jeepney to deliver the donated boxes to an orphanage in Ermita Church before receiving their next clue.
- This leg's Detour was a choice between Heel or Wheel. In Heel, teams had to match 250 pairs of shoes from a messy pile to receive their next clue from a shopkeeper. In Wheel, teams had to choose a work station and fully assemble a bicycle with just the equipment and parts provided to get their next clue.
- After the Detour, teams had to check in at the Pit Stop: Paco Park & Cemetery.

Additional note

- Joey Lina served as the Pit Stop greeter for this leg.

=== Leg 3 (Philippines → Hong Kong → New Zealand) ===
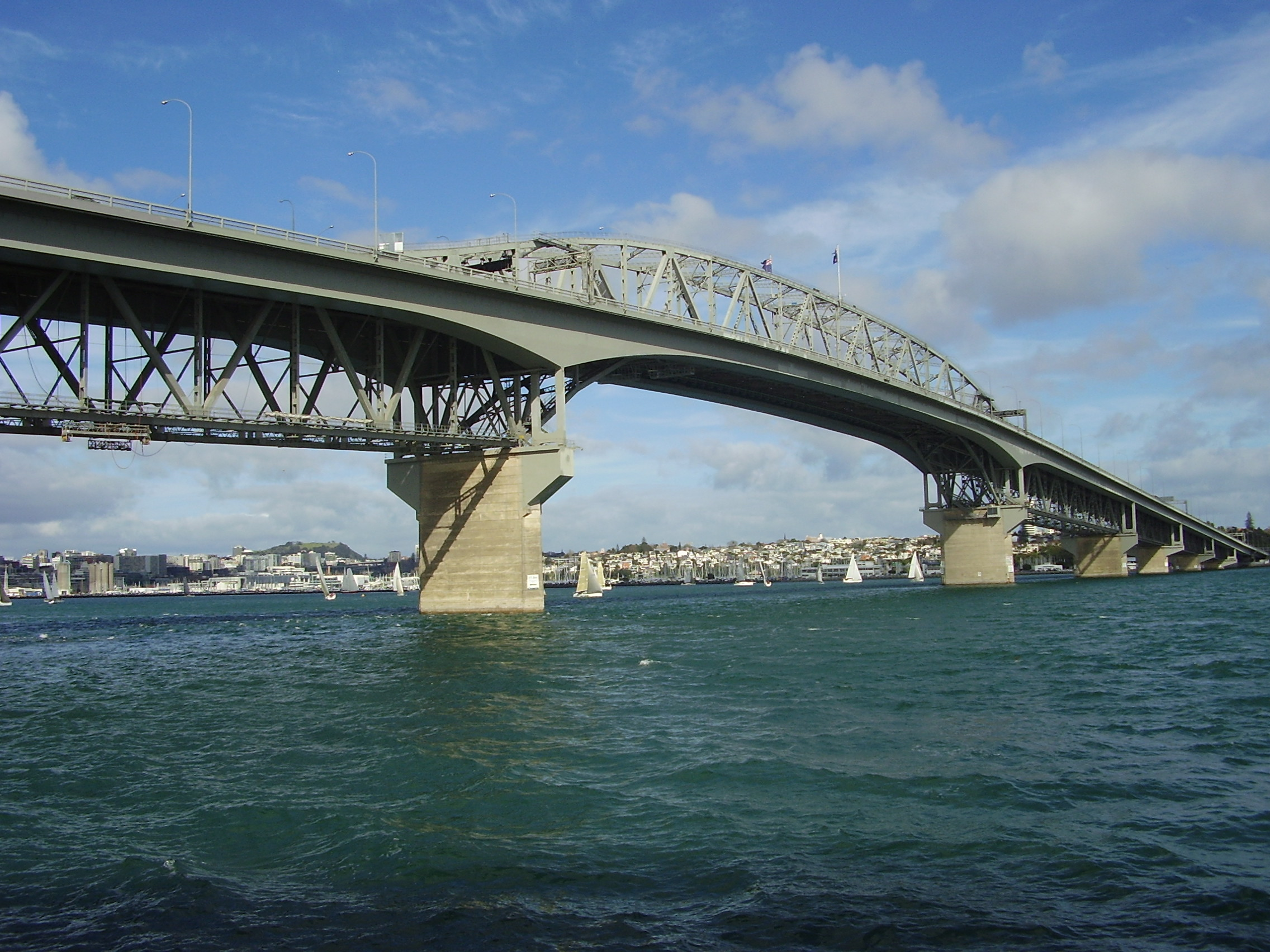
The Roadblock in New Zealand had one team member bungee jump off the Auckland Harbour Bridge to receive their clue.

- Episode 3: "I Don't Think I Wanna Be Rich" (6 December 2007)
- Prize: A one year's supply of fuel sponsored by Caltex (awarded to Marc & Rovilson)
- Eliminated: Brett & Kinaryosih

Locations

- Manila (Paco Park & Cemetery)
- Manila (Ninoy Aquino International Airport) → Hong Kong (Hong Kong International Airport)
- Hong Kong (Central Piers)
- Hong Kong (Causeway Bay – Standard Chartered Bank)
- Hong Kong (Hong Kong International Airport) → Auckland, New Zealand (Auckland Airport)
- Pakuranga (Howick Historical Village)
- Auckland (Auckland Harbour Bridge)
- Auckland (Birkenhead Leisure Centre or Lake Pupuke – North Shore Rowing Club)
- Matakana (Ascension Vineyard)
- Karaka (Spookers Haunted House – Old Nurses' Hostel)
- Karaka (Spookers Haunted House – Forest of Fear)

Episode summary

- At the start of the leg, teams were instructed to fly to Hong Kong. Once there, they had to travel to Central Piers to get their next clue, directing them to Standard Chartered Bank at Causeway Bay, where they had to count the local currency from their tables, which included a large pile of notes and also a large stack of coins, and calculate the correct amount to receive their next clue. Each table had a unique amount of money.
- After completing the task, teams were instructed to fly to Auckland, New Zealand. Upon arrival, they had to search the airport parking lot for a marked car, which contained their next clue, instructed to drive themselves to Howick Historical Village, where they had to get their next clue for three specific persons (Mary Syms, Robert McClane, and A Poke for a Pig) based on the early settlers of New Zealand, and use a Sony Cyber-shot digital camera to photograph them. Then, they had to present their "evidence" pictures to the judge at the Howick Courthouse to receive their next clue.
- In this leg's Roadblock, one team member had to perform a 40-metre (130 ft) bungee jump from the Auckland Harbour Bridge to receive their next clue.
- This leg's Detour was a choice between two adventure sports, Wall or Waka. In Wall, teams had to head to the Birkenhead Leisure Centre in Birkenhead, where each team member had to climb the rock wall once to retrieve one flag each. Then, one team member had to climb the wall again to grab their next clue. In Waka, teams had to go to Lake Pupuke and paddle a traditional outrigger canoe, known locally as "Waka ama", around the lake to collect three flags and then return to receive their next clue.
- After the Detour, teams had to drive to Ascension Vineyard to find their next clue, directing them to Spookers Haunted House at the former Kingseat Hospital, where they had to enter the Old Nurses' Hostel, rumored to be haunted and filled with scary characters, and complete the walk through the haunted house to receive their next clue, which directed them to travel on foot to the woods at the rear of the Old Hostel and searched the Pit Stop nearby.

Additional note

- Brett & Kinaryosih were unable to complete the Detour, since they arrived at the North Shore Rowing Club after business hours, they backed out of the Wall Detour. They were unable to complete either side of the Detour and instead were directly to the Pit Stop for elimination.

=== Leg 4 (New Zealand) ===
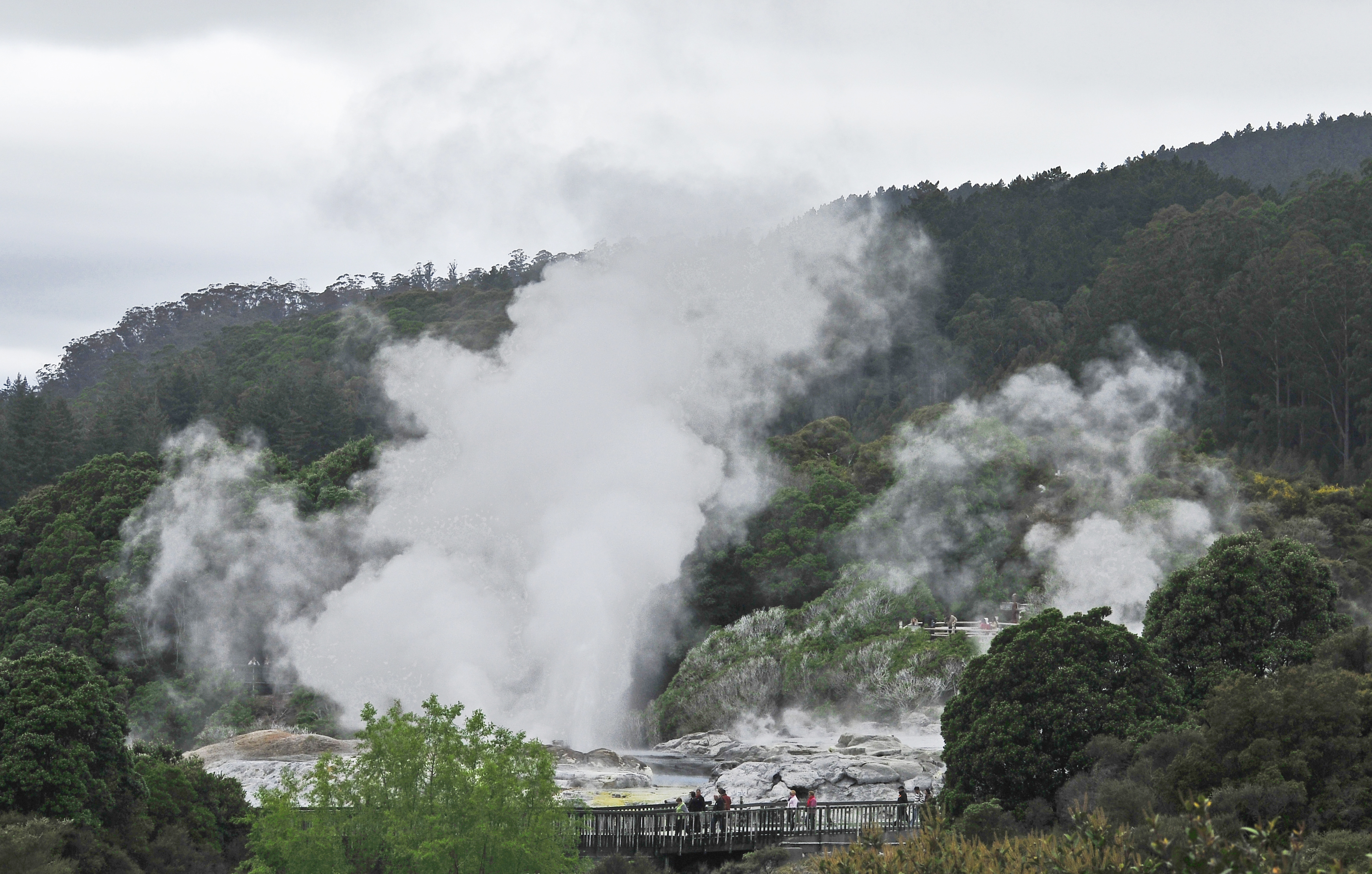
Teams ended this leg around Rotorua at Pōhutu Geyser in Whakarewarewa.

- Episode 4: "It's a Really Tough Way to End" (13 December 2007)
- Prize: A Sony Handycam SR7 for each team member (awarded to Marc & Rovilson)
- Eliminated: Sophie & Aurelia

Locations

- Karaka (Spookers Haunted House)
- Tīrau (Caltex Gas Station)
- Rotorua (Okere Falls Scenic Reserve)
- Rotorua (Blue Lake)
- Rotorua (Hell's Gate)
- Rotorua (Whakarewarewa – Te Puia)
- Rotorua (Whakarewarewa – Pōhutu Geyser)

Episode summary

- At the start of the leg, teams were instructed to drive to Rotorua. Along the way, they had to make a stop at the small farming town of Tīrau and find a Caltex Gas Station. There, they had to refuel their cars and pay for their fuel using a special Caltex card before receiving their next clue from the cashier.
- The clue directed the teams to head to Okere Falls Scenic Reserve where they had to perform white water sledging in the cold rapids before retrieving their next clue, instructed them to head to Blue Lake, where they had to successfully drive a 450-horsepower Agrojet Boat through a course, with one racer serving as the driver and the other as the navigator, to receive their next clue.
- In this leg's Roadblock, one team member had to enter the Hell's Gate mud bath, which contains sulphur pools at temperatures of 40 °C (104 °F), and search for a stick, which they could exchange for their next clue.
- This leg's Detour was a choice between Flax or Stick. In Flax, teams had to weave traditional Māori headbands called a tipare out of flax plants to the satisfaction of the demonstrators to receive their next clue. In Stick, teams had to master a traditional Māori stick game called the tītī tōrea in which team members had to pass specially carved sticks to each other in a particular rhythm without dropping the sticks to receive their next clue.
- After the Detour, teams had to check in at the Pit Stop: Pōhutu Geyser.

Additional note

- Sophie & Aurelia were unable to complete both the Roadblock and Detour since they arrived at Okere Falls after closing down for the day. After all teams had already checked in at the Pit Stop, Allan came to the location to inform them of their elimination.

=== Leg 5 (New Zealand → Japan → South Korea) ===
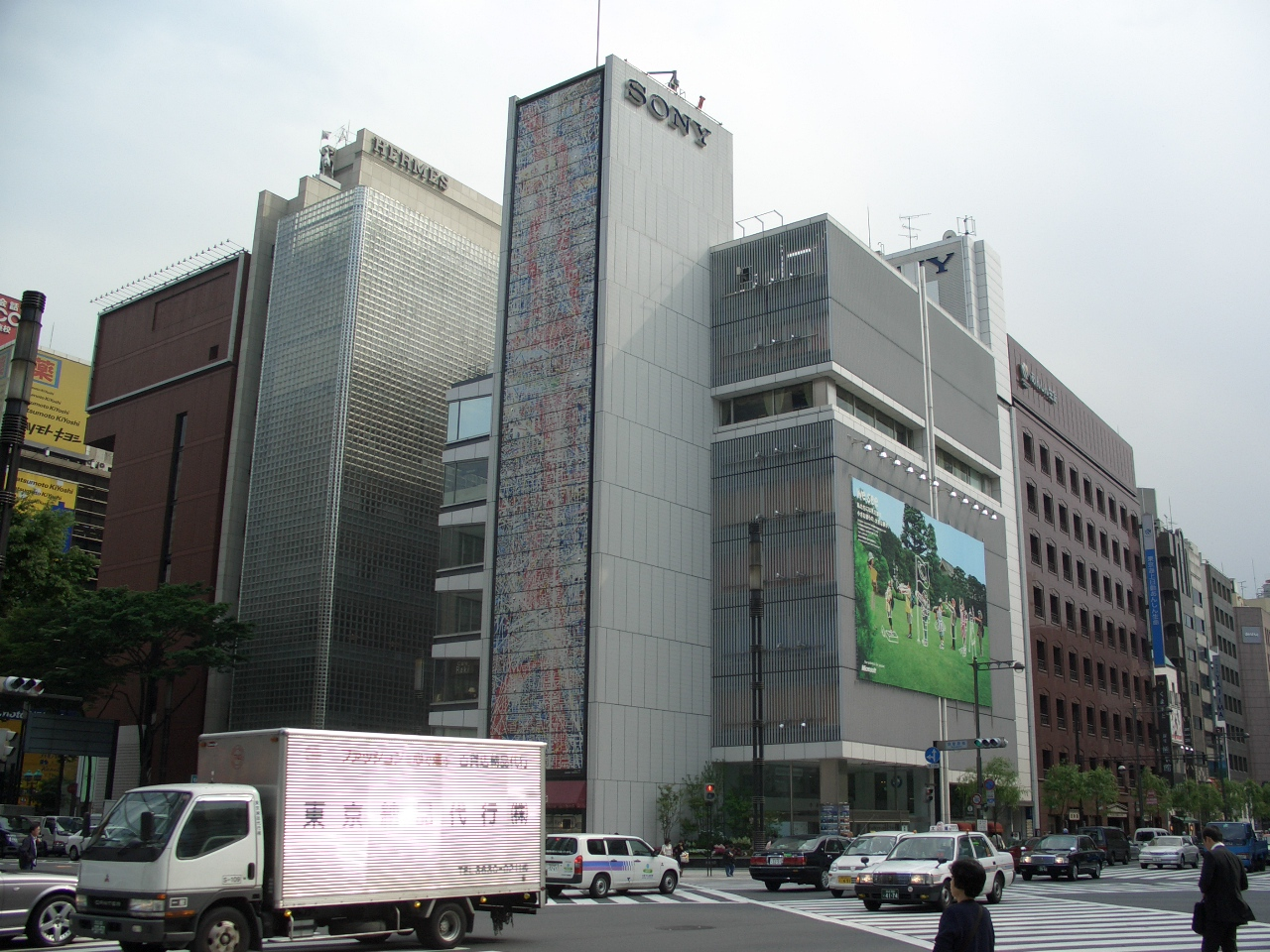
The double-length leg where teams traveled to Sony Building in Tokyo where teams had to convince locals to sing a traditional Japanese folk song called "Sakura"...

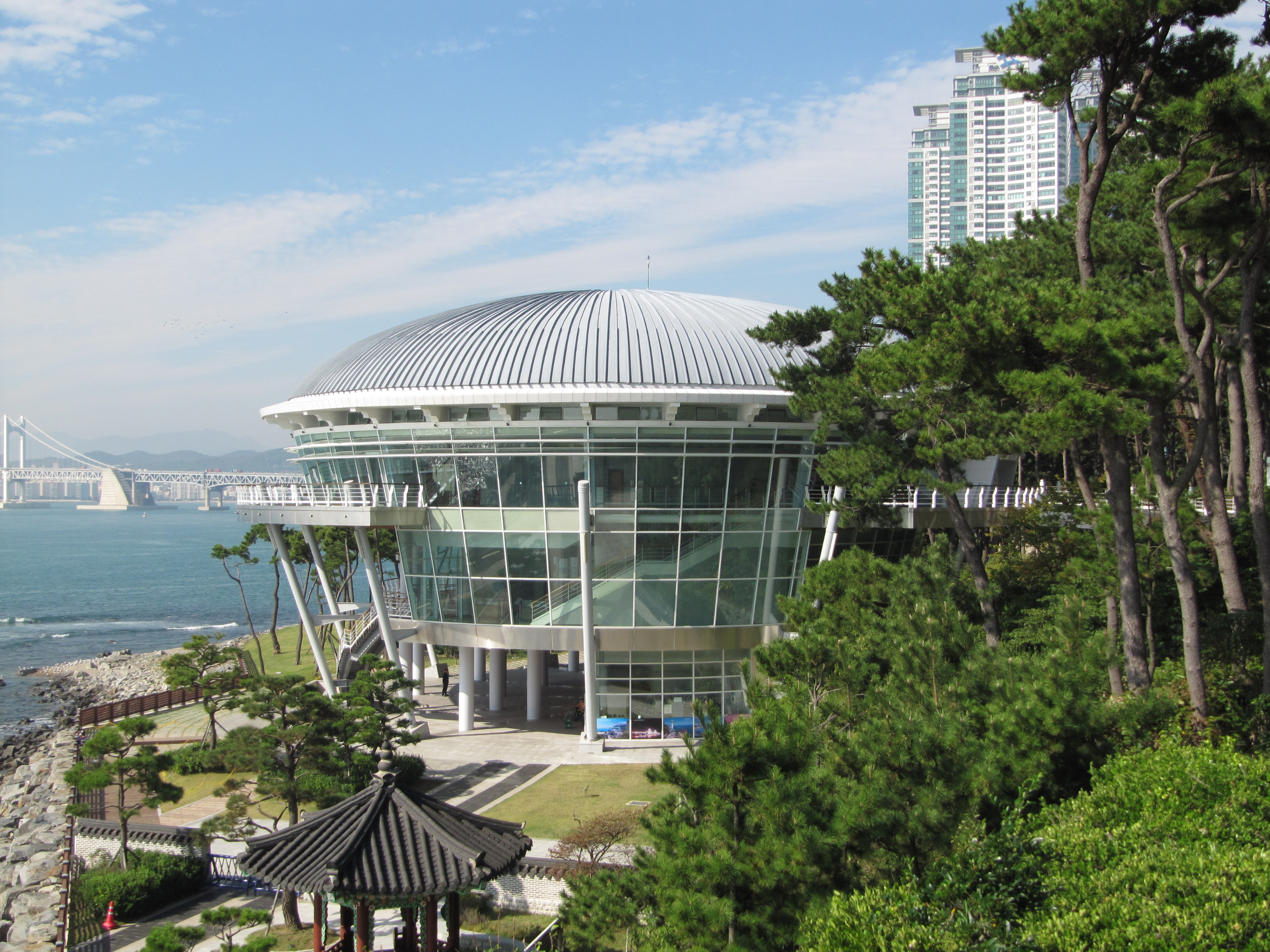
...before continuing to Busan, South Korea, where teams visited Nurimaru House, the location of the 2005 APEC Summit.

- Episode 5: "Sometimes It's Right in Your Face" (20 December 2007) & Episode 6: "We Choose to Yield Magnum, P.I." (27 December 2007)
- Eliminated: Daichi & Sawaka

Locations

- Rotorua (Whakarewarewa – Pohutu Geyser)
- Auckland (Auckland Airport) → Tokyo, Japan (Narita International Airport)
- Narita (Narita Airport Terminal 2·3 Station) → Tokyo (Chiyoda or Minato)
- Tokyo (Shiba Park)
- Tokyo (Sony Building)
- Tokyo (Shibuya Mark City)
- Tokyo (Shōtō Restaurant or Dry Cleaner 24 and Kimono Rental AKI)
- Tokyo (Icebar Tokyo)
- Tokyo (Shinagawa Station) → Fukuoka (Hakata Station)
- Fukuoka (International Congress Center)
- Fukuoka (Hakata Port Ferry Terminal) → Busan, South Korea (Busan Harbour Pier 1)
- Busan (Jongro Academy)
- Busan (Jagalchi Market)
- Busan (Haeundae Beach – Nurimaru APEC House (in Dutch))
- Busan (Yongdusan Park)
- Busan (Beomeosa Temple)

Episode summary (episode 5)

- At the start of the leg, teams were instructed to fly to Tokyo, Japan. Once there, they must take a train to Shiba Park where they had to take a marked rickshaw and direct their guide to the Sony Building in Ginza to receive their next clue.
- At the Sony Building, teams had to convince a local to sing the traditional Japanese folk song "Sakura" with one team member while their partner recorded them on a Sony HD Handycam. If they sung the lyrics correctly, the staff at Sony would hand teams their next clue, that would lead them to receive a Sony Cyber-shot digital camera which had a picture of a cosplaying girl. Teams had to find the person in their picture at Shibuya Mark City to receive their next clue.
- This leg's first Detour was a choice between You Catch It or You Cart It. In You Catch It, teams had to participate in the traditional game of goldfish scooping by using paddles made of pith paper, which disintegrate very easily when immersed in water, to scoop up 40 goldfish and receive their next clue. In You Cart It, teams had to locate Dry Cleaner 24 and collect a yukata, which they had to deliver to Kimono Rental AKI to receive their next clue.
- In this leg's first Roadblock, one team member had to enter the −5 °C (23 °F) Icebar Tokyo and decipher an ice block puzzle by arranging lettered ice blocks to form the name of one of the biggest cities in Japan with the correct next destination: FUKUOKA. Once they solved correctly, they would receive a block of ice with a next clue frozen inside.
- After the first Roadblock, teams had to travel to Shinagawa Station and board a bullet train to Fukuoka. Once there, teams had to find the Pit Stop: International Congress Center. There, teams met Allan, who told them that the leg was not over before handing them their next clue.

Episode summary (episode 6)

- Teams were instructed to take a ferry to Busan, South Korea. Once there, they must head to Jongro Academy where each team member had to use taekwondo techniques to break three boards by kicking them before receiving their next clue from the taekwondo master, directing them to Jagalchi Market where they had to find the Golden Pig statue, to find the Yield and their next clue.
- This leg's second Detour was a choice between Slither or Deliver. In Slither, teams had to find a marked fish tank filled with octopus at the Jagalchi Fish Market. Each team member then had to retrieve one 100-year-old Korean coin from the bottom of the tank before receiving their next clue. In Deliver, teams would have had to deliver two meals each on their heads to three different addresses to receive their next clue. All teams chose Slither.
- After the second Detour, teams had to travel to Nurimaru APEC House in Haeundae Beach to get their next clue.
- In this leg's second Roadblock, one team member had to use a key at Yongdusan Park to open one of the locks to receive their next clue from the gatekeeper. Racers would have to start over if they broke their key.
- After the second Roadblock, teams had to head to the Pit Stop: Beomeosa Temple.

Additional notes

- Allan Wu actually identified the Pit Stop location, however, it was misled as in fact a virtual Pit Stop.
- Terri & Henry attempted to use the Yield against Marc & Rovilson; however, Marc & Rovilson had already passed the Yield by this point and were therefore unaffected.

=== Leg 6 (South Korea) ===
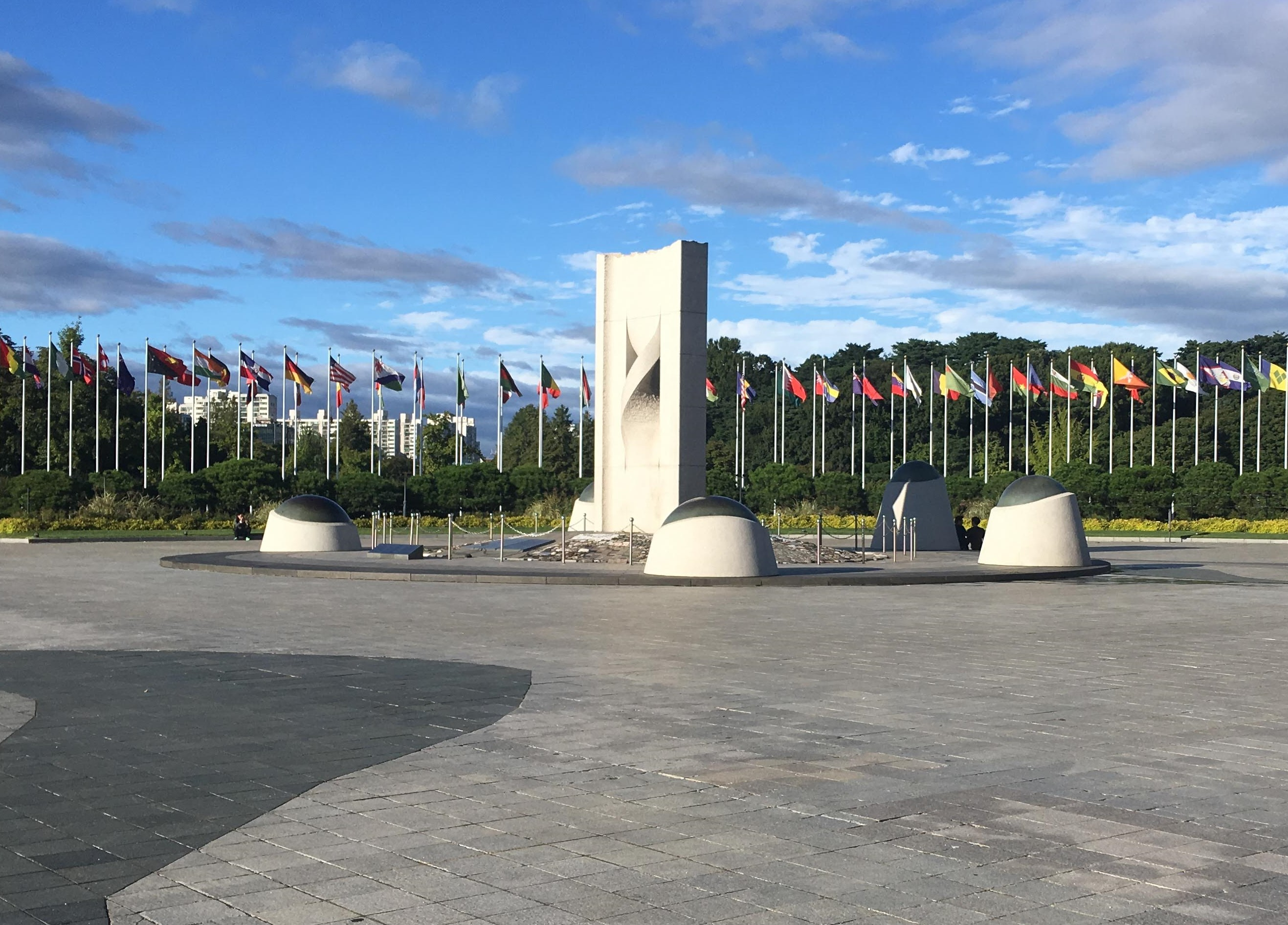
Teams finished the leg around South Korea at Seoul's Olympic Park Peace Plaza, overlooking the World Peace Gate.

- Episode 7: "Did That Hit Your Head?" (3 January 2008)

Locations

- Busan (Beomeosa Temple)
- Anseong-si (Seoil Farm)
- Suwon (Woncheon Lakeland Resort)
- Yongin (Korean Folk Village)
- Seoul (Olympic Park – Peace Plaza)

Episode summary

- At the start of the leg, teams had to choose a marked vehicle and instructed to drive themselves to Seoil Farm in Anseong where they would get their next clue.
- In this leg's Roadblock, one team member had to search under the lids of 1,500 soybean jars until they found one containing their next clue. In addition, one of the jars contained the clue plus a US$50 bonus from Standard Chartered, where Adrian & Collin won the reward.
- After the Roadblock, teams had to head to Woncheon Lakeland Resort, where they must search among many swan paddle boats for a marked one, which they had to paddle to an offshore buoy to retrieve their next clue, instructed them to travel to Korean Folk Village in Yongin.
- This leg's Detour was a choice between Too Ho or Too Heavy. In Too Ho, teams had to play a traditional Korean game where they had to throw three bamboo stickets into a cylinder 4.5 metres (15 ft) away to receive their next clue. In Too Heavy, teams had to deliver 30 logs using a jige to a woman in the village before receiving their next clue.
- After the Detour, teams had to drive to Seoul and find the Peace Plaza at the Olympic Park for the Pit Stop.

Additional note

- This leg was a non-elimination leg.

=== Leg 7 (South Korea → Germany → Czech Republic) ===
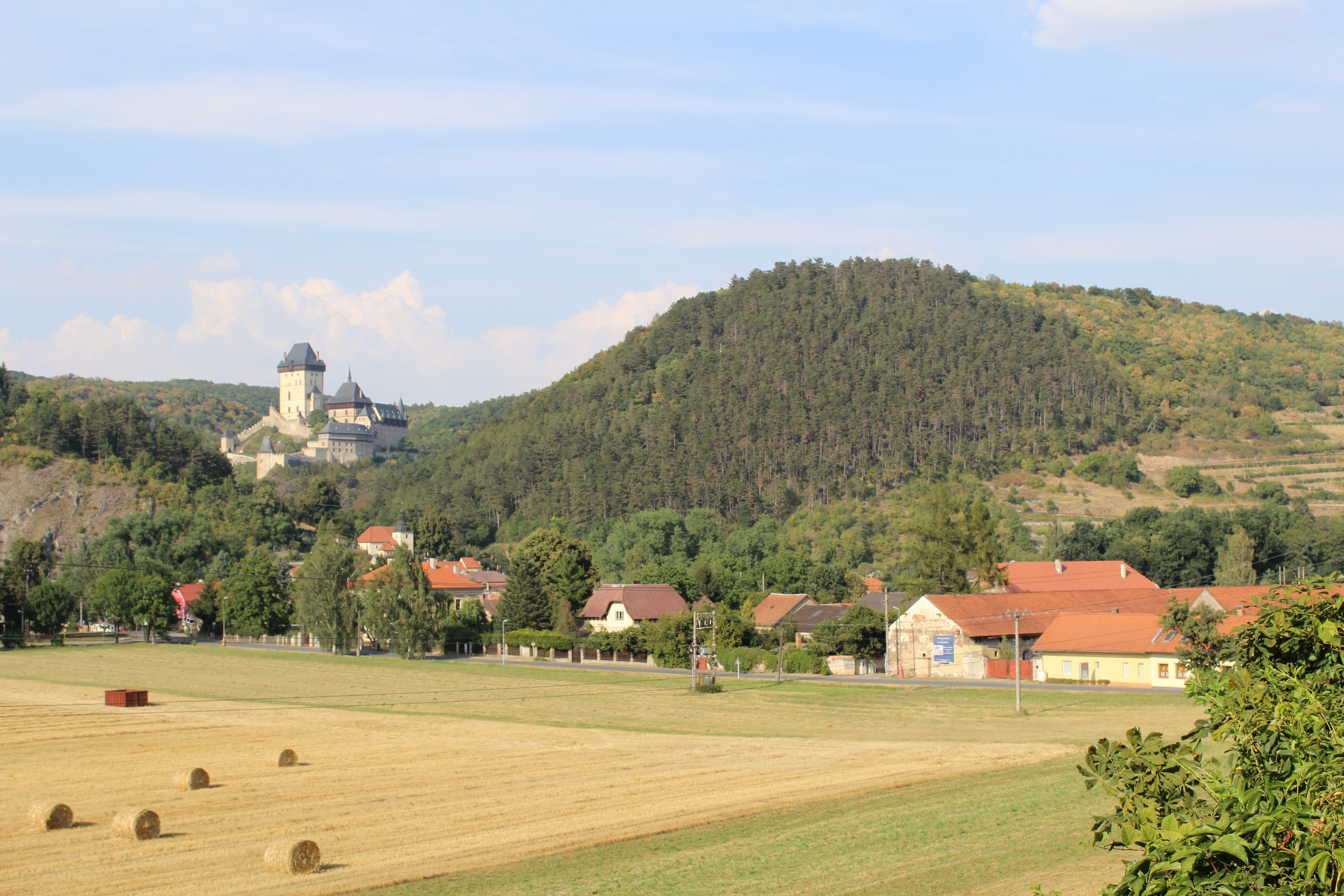
This leg in Czech Republic took place mainly in the countryside district of Beroun where teams finished on the grounds overlooking Karlštejn Castle.

- Episode 8: "Can You Send Them to Spain" (10 January 2008)
- Prize: US$5,000 credit card issued by Standard Chartered Bank for each team member (awarded to Marc & Rovlison)

Locations

- Seoul (Olympic Park – Peace Plaza)
- Seoul (Incheon International Airport) → Frankfurt, Germany (Frankfurt Airport)
- Frankfurt (Old Opera House)
- Frankfurt (Frankfurt (Main) Hauptbahnhof) → Prague, Czech Republic (Praha Hlavní Nádraží)
- Prague (Charles Bridge – Statue of St. Vitus)
- Prague (Karlova Street (in Czech) – Little Shop, Building #3)
- Prague (Old Town Square – Kinský Palace)
- Prague (Hotel U Prince)
- Prague (Praha Hlavní Nádraží) → Beroun (Beroun Railway Station (in Czech))
- Beroun (Town Square)
- Nižbor (Rückl Crystal or Archery Range)
- Karlštejn (Karlštejn Castle)

Episode summary

- At the start of the leg, teams were instructed to fly to Frankfurt, Germany. Once there, they had to travel to Old Opera House for their next clue, instructing them to take a train to Prague, Czech Republic. Upon arrival, they had to travel to Charles Bridge to search their next clue.
- The clue instructed teams to have given a hint that said the "holey" statue would lead them to it, only to figure out they were searching for the Statue of Saint Vitus with a hole in it to grab their next clue, directing them to Little Shop, Building # 3 at Karlova Street to grab their another clue hanging down from the shop's door, which would direct them to Kinský Palace for their next clue.
- In this leg's Roadblock, one team member had to don a full suit of knight's armour and walk to the busy streets to look for a "damsel in distress", who was standing on a balcony at the Hotel U Prince. Once team members found her, they had to tie a key to a rope which the "damsel" would exchange a scroll as their next clue.
- After the Roadblock, teams had to travel by train to Beroun. Once there, they had to drive to the Town Square to search among several people with Nokia N95 mobile phones for the one with their team's picture, then play the video message from home to receive their next clue.
- This leg's Detour was a choice between Blow or Bow. In Blow, teams had to travel to Rückl Crystal, where each team member had to carve a star design on the bottom of a glass cup to receive their next clue. In Bow, each team member had to hit a red-and-yellow coloured target using a traditional crossbow to receive their next clue.
- After the Detour, teams had to drive to the Pit Stop: Karlštejn Castle.

Additional notes

- Once in Beroun, teams had to find a marked Škoda Favorit car that would serve as their transportation for the rest of the leg.
- This leg was a non-elimination leg.

=== Leg 8 (Czech Republic) ===
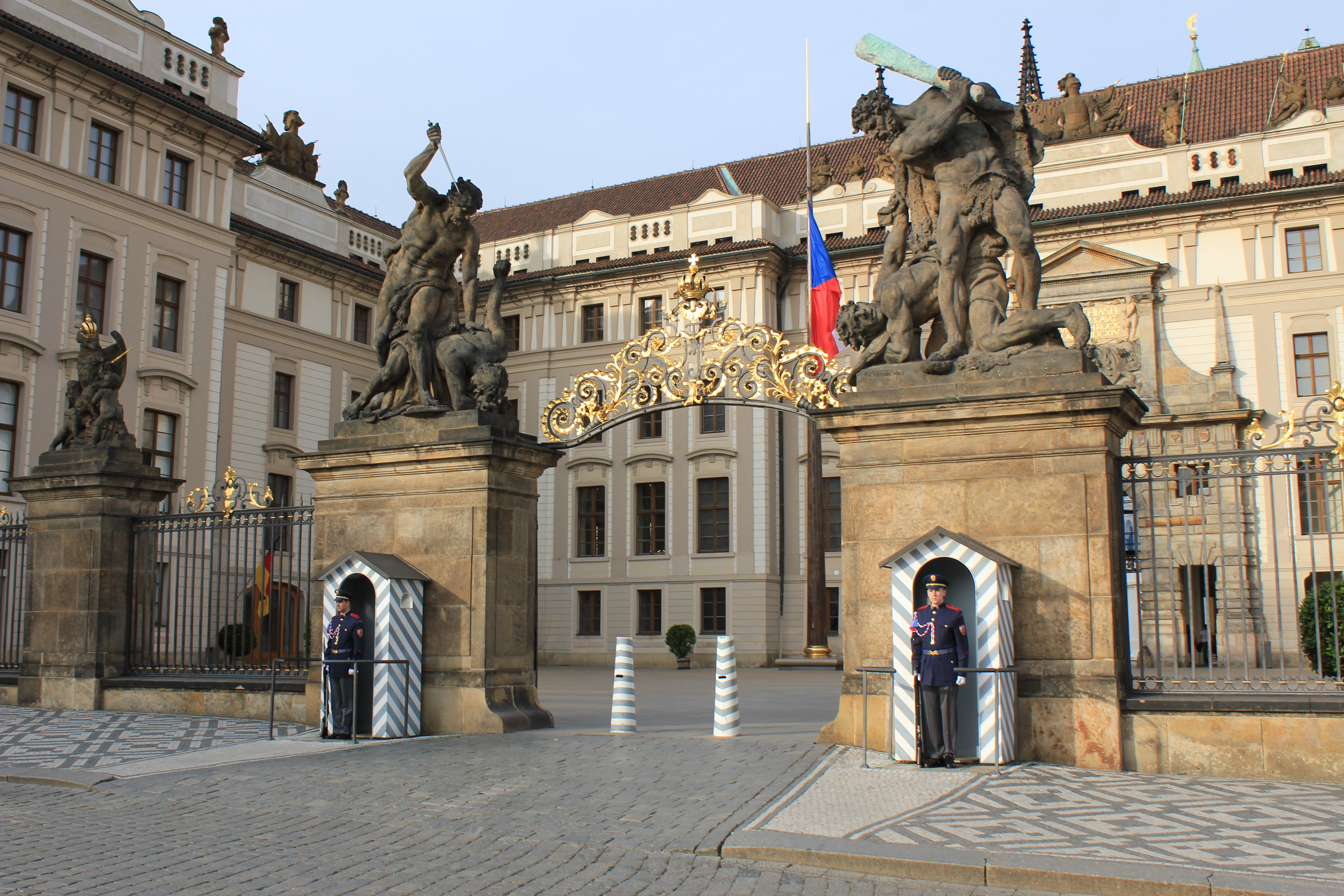
While in Prague, teams visited the Prague Castle, the biggest ancient castle in the world, where they encountered an Intersection.

- Episode 9: "So We're Going to The Pit Stop?" (17 January 2008)
- Prize: A Sony Handycam SR7 for each team member (awarded to Marc & Rovilson)
- Eliminated: Terri & Henry

Locations

- Karlštejn (Karlštejn Castle)
- Karlštejn (Karlštejn Train Station (in Czech)) → Prague (Praha Hlavní Nádraží)
- Prague (Újezd Station → Petřín Hill Observation Tower)
- Prague (Střelecký Island → Vltava Riverbank)
- Prague (Prague Castle)
- Prague (Ice Arena Letňany)
- Prague (Statue of St. Wenceslas, Museum of Communism, Estates Theatre, and Statue of Josef Mánes or Hostinec U Váhy and Admiral Botel)
- Prague (Plavecký Stadion Podolí)
- Prague (Vrtbovská Garden)

Episode summary

- At the start of the leg, teams were instructed to take a train to Prague. Once there, they had to travel to Petřín Hill Observation Tower, where they had to ride the Petřín funicular to the top of the tower, then, they must have to count the number of steps leading to the top of the tower and write the correct answer (299) on a board to receive their next clue, directing them to Střelecký Island and had to row a boat on the Vltava River in the direction of 140 degrees southwest, using a provided compass, to retrieve their clue.
- At Prague Castle, teams encountered an Intersection, where teams were required to work together in pairs to complete tasks until further notice. The teams were paired up thusly: Marc & Rovilson and Adrian & Collin, Vanessa & Pamela and Ann & Diane, and Paula & Natasha and Terri & Henry.
- The Intersected teams had to travel to Ice Arena Letňany where each team member had to shoot one goal from three different points on the rink against the professional hockey team to receive their next clue.
- This leg's Detour for the Intersected teams was a choice between Snap or Roll. In Snap, the Intersected teams had to take photos of three historic monuments using a Sony Cyber-shot camera: Statue of St. Wenceslas at Wenceslas Square, Stalin Statue in the Museum of Communism, and Estates Theatre, and show these photographs to the personnel positioned in front of the Statue of Josef Mánes to receive their next clue. In Roll, the Intersected teams had to locate Hostinec U Váhy, collect two 50-litre (13 US gal) beer kegs, and roll them over to the Admiral Botel to receive their next clue.
- After the Detour, the Intersection ended. Teams had to travel to Plavecký Stadion Podolí in order to find their next clue.
- In this leg's Roadblock, one team member had to climb up to the 10-metre (33 ft) high diving platform and jump into the pool to retrieve their next clue, directing them to the Pit Stop: Vrtbovská Garden.

=== Leg 9 (Czech Republic → Hungary) ===
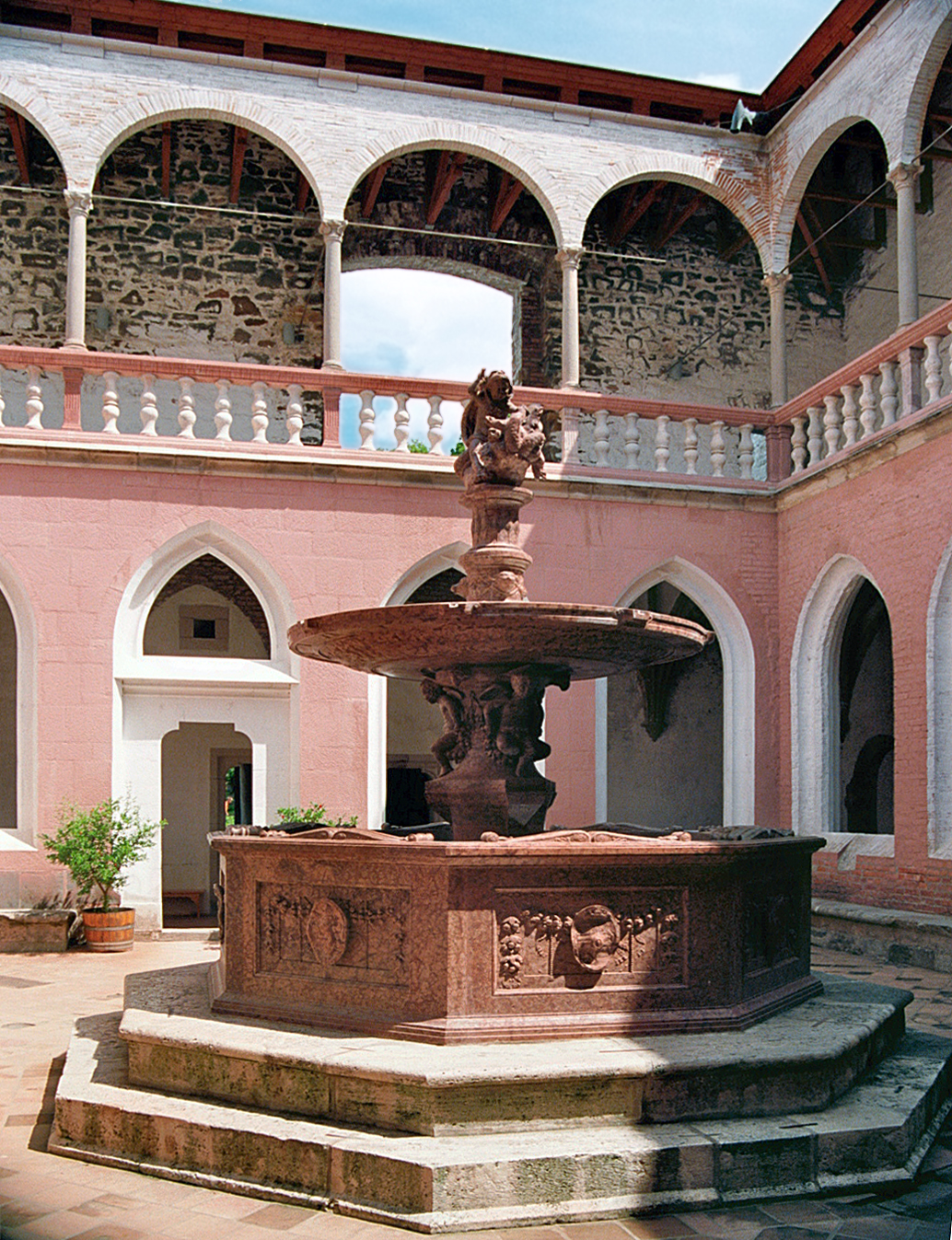
The Hercules Fountain in the Royal Palace of Visegrád was visited by teams in this leg.

- Episode 10: "Apparently Driving Like a Looney Over Here Is Fine For Them" (24 January 2008)
- Prize: Nokia N95 and N73 mobile phones, one for each team member (awarded to Adrian & Collin)

Locations

- Prague (Vrtbovská Garden)
- Prague (Praha Hlavní Nádraží) → Budapest, Hungary (Budapest Keleti Railway Station)
- Budapest (Batthyány Square)
- Szentendre (Szentendre Island – Magyar Farm)
- Visegrád (Fun Extreme Canopy)
- Visegrád (Royal Palace – Hercules Fountain)
- Visegrád (Salamon Tower (in Hungarian))

Episode summary

- At the start of this leg, teams were instructed to travel by train to Budapest, Hungary. Once there, teams found their next clue outside of the Keleti station. Teams then had to find their next clue at Batthyány Square before driving to Magyar Farm.
- This leg's Detour was a choice between Pitch or Pull. In Pitch, teams had to load a large pile of hay into a horse-drawn cart and then deliver it to a farmer in exchange for their clue. In Pull, teams had to milk a goat and obtain 200 millilitres (6.8 US fl oz) of milk. After milking the goat, teams had to place her in a holding pen before delivering the milk to a farmer in exchange for their next clue.
- In this leg's Roadblock, one team member had to ride ten sections of a flying fox course and add up several numbers found around the course to the correct total of 1,000 to receive their next clue. Only one racer could ride the flying fox at a time, and they would have to go to the back of any line formed by other racers if they gave an incorrect answer.
- After the Roadblock, teams had to drive to the Hercules Fountain printed on a provided 1,000 forint bank note and find their next clue, which directed them to the Pit Stop: Salamon Tower.

Additional notes

- Teams had to choose a marked Suzuki Swift car as their transportation for the rest of the leg.
- This was a non-elimination leg.

=== Leg 10 (Hungary) ===
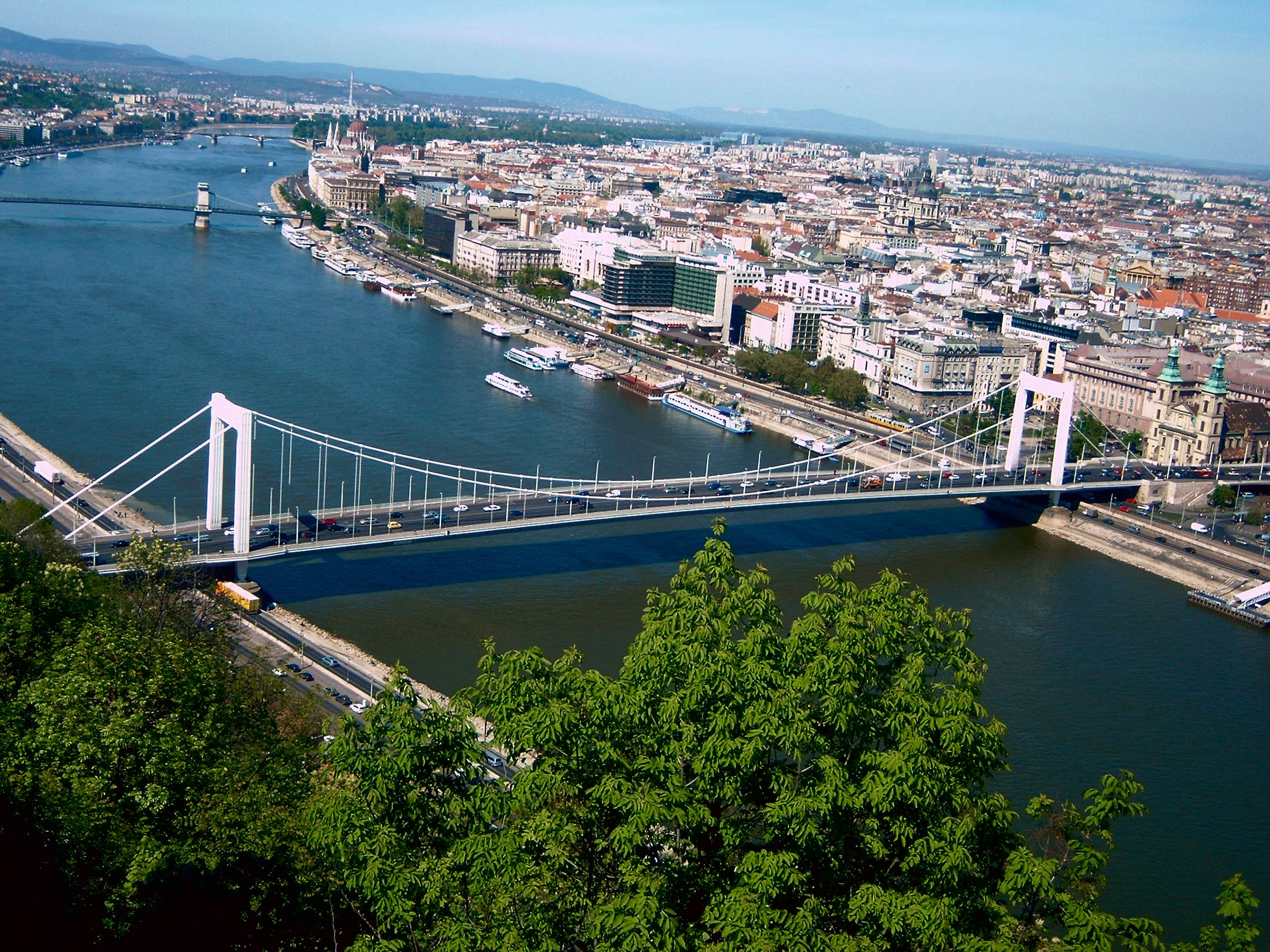
The Fast Forward in Budapest required teams to count the number of fence posts on Elisabeth Bridge.

- Episode 11: "This Is Embarrassing, There's a Guy Running Faster Than Us" (31 January 2008)
- Eliminated: Paula & Natasha

Locations

- Visegrád (Salamon Tower (in Hungarian))
- Budapest (Little Princess Statue)
  - Budapest (Elisabeth Bridge)
- Budapest (Buda Castle – Budavári Labirintus)
- Budapest (Margaret Island – Resting Place of Saint Margaret)
- Budapest (Heroes' Square)
- Budapest (Gellért Hill – Freedom Monument)

Episode summary

- At the start of the leg, teams had to drive to Budapest, where they had to find Little Princess Statue in order to find their next clue.
- In this season's only Fast Forward, teams had to count the number of vertical bars on Elisabeth Bridge and then use the number obtained to open a safe with a four-digit combination: 2377. The first team to open the safe would win the Fast Forward award. Adrian & Collin won the Fast Forward.
- Teams who did not choose the Fast Forward where they had to drive to Buda Castle to find their next clue.
- In this leg's Roadblock, one team member had to take a lantern and search through the dark and confusing labyrinth of tunnels beneath Buda Castle to search for the one out of several chests that contained their next clue.
- After the Roadblock, teams make their way to Margaret Island where they must travel by pedicab across the island and search for Saint Margaret's resting place. Once there, they had to retrieve a rabbit stuffed toy, a symbol of the island, and deliver it to the pedicab manager to receive their next clue, instructed them to travel to Heroes' Square.
- This leg's Detour was a choice between Say It or Play It. In Say It, teams had to pronounce the names of fourteen prominent Hungarian rulers listed on the square's colonnade correctly with a Hungarian accent in order to receive their next clue. In Play It, teams had to solve a Rubik's Cube, but were given the option to solve one colour at a time for each of six sides and alternating between team members, to receive their next clue.

No.	Ruler	Native name
1	King Saint Stephen	Szent István király
2	Saint Ladislaus	Szent László
3	Coloman the Book Lover	Könyves Kálmán
4	Andrew II	II. András
5	Béla IV	IV. Béla
6	Charles Robert	Károly Róbert
7	Louis the Great	Nagy Lajos
8	John Hunyadi	Hunyadi János
9	Matthias Hunyadi	Hunyadi Mátyás
10	Stephen Bocskai	Bocskai István
11	Gabriel Bethlen	Bethlen Gábor
12	Emeric Thököly	Thököly Imre
13	Francis II Rákóczi	II. Rákóczi Ferenc
14	Lajos Kossuth	Kossuth Lajos

- After the Detour, teams had to travel to the Pit Stop: Freedom Monument.

Additional note

- Marc & Rovilson chose to Yield Ann & Diane.

=== Leg 11 (Hungary → South Africa) ===
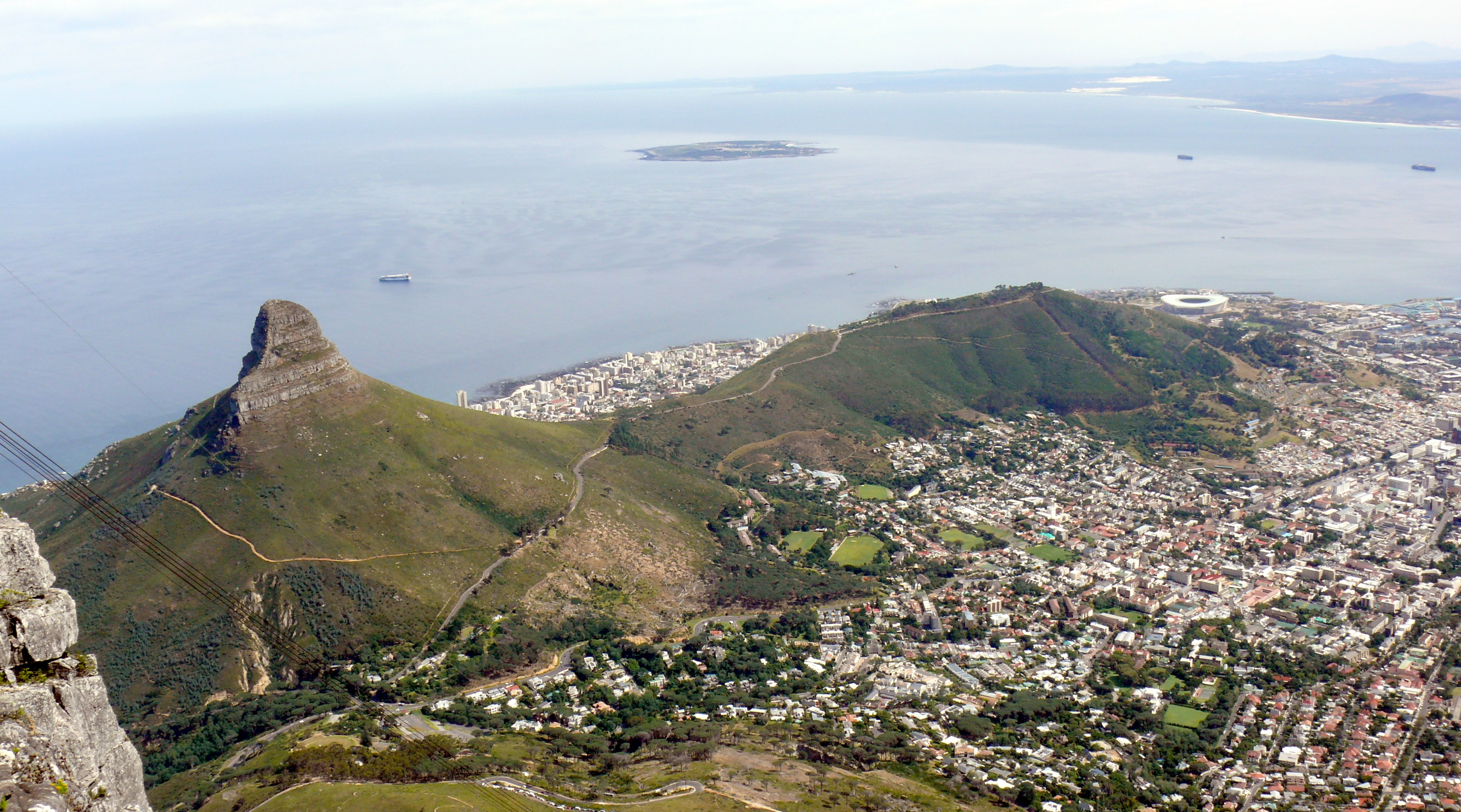
After arriving in Cape Town, teams had search for one clue box among many at Signal Hill that contained their next clue.

- Episode 12: "I Haven't Seen So Much Dung in My Life" (7 February 2008)
- Prize: A safari trip to South Africa with whale watching, courtesy of Caltex (awarded to Marc & Rovilson)
- Eliminated: Ann & Diane

Locations

- Budapest (Heroes' Square)
- Budapest (Budapest Ferihegy International Airport) → Cape Town, South Africa (Cape Town International Airport)
- Cape Town (Signal Hill)
- Cape Town (Killarney Motor Racing Complex)
- Cape Town (Khayelitsha – Intyatyambo Community Project)
- Touws River (Aquila Private Game Reserve – Cheetah Enclosure)
- Touws River (Aquila Private Game Reserve – Elephant Boma)
- Touws River (Aquila Private Game Reserve – Stone Cottage)

Episode summary

- At the start of the leg, teams were instructed to fly to Cape Town, South Africa. Once there, teams had to drive to Signal Hill and must enter the summit of it, teams had to search among several clue boxes that contains the one for their next clue, directing them to drive to Killarney Motor Racing Complex.
- In this leg's Roadblock, one team member had to race eight laps around the Killarney racing circuit on a 450 horsepower (340 kW) open-wheel race car to receive their next clue from a race official. After four laps, they had to enter the pit area for a mandatory tune-up and if the team members entered it after seven minutes, they would incur a five-minute penalty.
- After the Roadblock, teams had to drive to Intyatyambo Community Project where they had to collect painting supplies from a Standard Chartered pickup truck and paint a marked section of the community centre to receive their next clue, which contained a R34,500 (about US$5,000) cheque, courtesy of Standard Chartered, teams had to donate to the centre's caregivers before leaving, directing them to drive to the Aquila Park Game Reserve where they would get their next clue from in a cheetah enclosure.
- This leg's Detour was a choice between In One End or Out The Other. In In One End, teams would have had to prepare 100 kilograms (220 lb) of food and feed it to the elephants to receive their next clue. In Out The Other, teams had to clear an elephant enclosure of dung and move it to a marked area, using only the tools provided, to receive their next clue from a ranger. All teams chose Out the Other.
- After the Detour, teams had to ride a safari truck to the Pit Stop nearby at Stone Cottage.

=== Leg 12 (South Africa → Singapore) ===
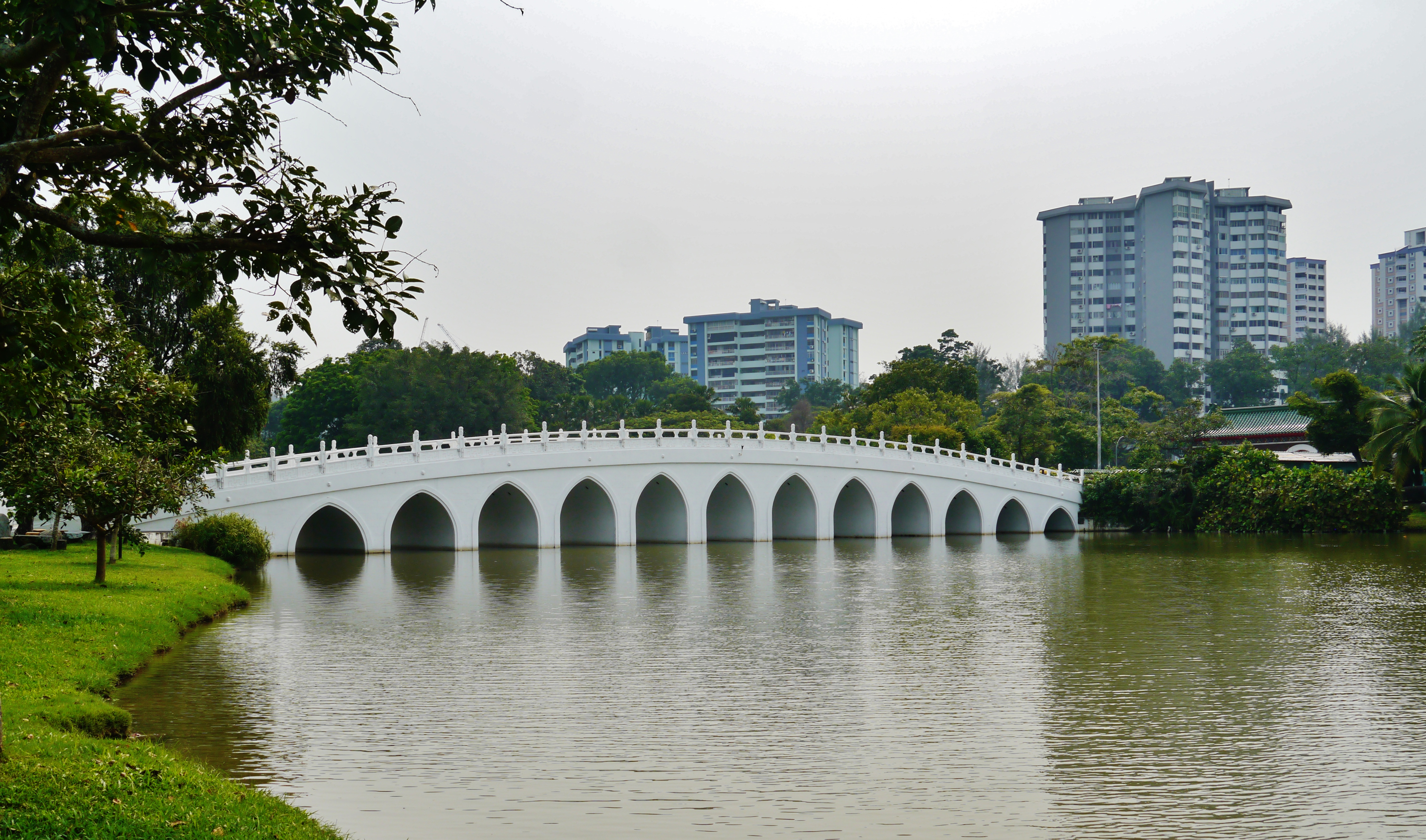
After returning to Singapore for the final leg, teams crossed the Finish Line at the Chinese Garden.

- Episode 13: "This Is Such an Amazing, Amazing Experience That No One Should Miss" (14 February 2008)
- Prize: US$100,000
- Winners: Adrian & Collin
- Runners-up: Vanessa & Pamela
- Third place: Marc & Rovilson

Locations

- Touws River (Aquila Private Game Reserve – Stone Cottage)
- Cape Town (District Six Museum)
- Cape Town (V&A Waterfront – The Scratch Patch or Master Wire and Bead Craft)
- Cape Town (FC Kapstadt Soccer Pitch next to Green Point Stadium)
- Atlantis (Atlantis Dunes)
- Cape Town (Cape Point – Lighthouse)
- Cape Town (Cape Town International Airport) → Singapore (Changi Airport)
- Singapore (Raffles' Landing Site)
- Singapore (Sentosa – Tanjong Beach)
- Singapore (Jurong East – Chinese Garden (Rainbow Bridge))

Episode summary

- At the start of the leg, teams had to drive to Cape Town and make their way to District Six Museum where they had to search for a Sony VAIO laptop and enter the name of a street of District Six as a password. When the correct street was entered, the next clue would direct them to read one paragraph from a designated marker before receiving their next clue.
- This season's final Detour was a choice between Search or Assemble (the latter was listed as "Sound" in teams' clues). In Search, teams had to go The Scratch Patch and search amongst thousands of semi-precious gemstones for three Amazing Race stones, which were yellow in colour with a red dot, that they could exchange for their next clue. In Assemble, teams had to go to Master Wire and Bead Craft and assemble a wire art radio using the tools provided to receive their next clue.
- After the Detour, teams had to drive to Green Point Stadium onto the stadium's field next to the then-still under construction of the 2010 World Cup Stadium, teams had to score three goals against a goal keeper to receive their next clue.
- Teams had to drive to Atlantis Dunes where they had to ride quad bikes along a marked course and search for their next clue hidden along the track beneath one of 18 marked areas with a bucket. The remaining 17 bucket contained hourglasses teams had to overturn and wait for the sand to run out before they could continue, directing them to Cape Point where teams must take the funicular up to the Upper Station and then walked to the historic lighthouse where teams had to guess the final country: SINGAPORE. Once they got the right guess, they would get their next clue.
- Teams were instructed to fly to Singapore. Once there, they had to make their way to Raffles' Landing Site for their next clue, directing them to Tanjong Beach in Sentosa where they would get their next clue.
- In this season's final Roadblock, one team member had to choose ten flags out of a basket of fifteen flags (which included five decoys) and arrange the flags of the countries they visited during the race in chronological order. Once all of the flags were in the correct order, teams could receive their final clue, directing them to the Finish Line: the Chinese Garden.

Order	Flags
1	Singapore
2	Philippines
3	Hong Kong
4	New Zealand
5	Japan
6	South Korea
7	Germany
8	Czech Republic
9	Hungary
10	South Africa
