= Rovilson Fernandez =

Filipino television personality (born 1973)

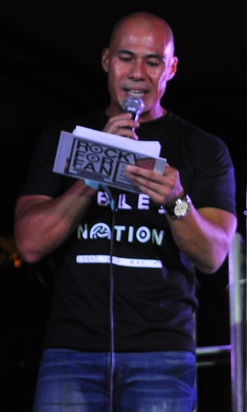
- Rovilson Fernandez at the Rock For a Fully Abled Nation benefit concert in Eastwood City, Quezon City, 2013.
- Born: September 26, 1973 (age 53); Sasebo, Nagasaki, Japan
- Occupations: Host, model, editor
- Years active: 2000–present

Rovilson Fernandez (born September 26, 1973) is an American model, host and magazine editor.

== Biography ==
He was born on September 26, 1973, in the US Naval base in Sasebo, Japan. His parents are of full Filipino descent, originally hailing from Dagupan, Philippines. He is the eldest of four children. He was raised in San Jose, California after his father, an electrical engineer in the US Navy, was restationed there when he was a toddler. Rovilson attended film school, fell in love with Asian Cinema and moved to Manila in 1999. Not finding any openings for directors, he suddenly found himself a travel show host for Lakbay TV.

He hosted Gameplan on Studio 23 and works an editor for Maxim Philippines. Together with Marc Nelson, he also hosted several television shows, including The Duke on AXN Asia, Dare Duo on QTV 11, and currently Asia's Got Talent, also on AXN Asia.

== The Amazing Race Asia 2 ==
Fernandez and his "best buddy" Marc Nelson are most noted for competing in the AXN reality show, The Amazing Race Asia 2. They hold the record for the most consecutive leg placing, finishing 1st from leg 2 to leg 8 and leg 11.

They finished in 3rd Place in Singapore, after Rovilson faltered at the final task, which was a roadblock, despite being the first to commence the task. It involved arranging of flags of the countries they had visited.

== TV shows ==
- Ang Pinaka on GMA News TV, formerly QTV then later Q (every Sunday night at 6:30 PM). Ang Pinaka is a Top 10 Countdown infotainment show hosted by Rovilson Fernandez with Maey and Betong.

Since October 2010, Rovilson became one of the Philippine National Ambassador for WWF (World Wide Fund for Nature). His other advocacies include National Peace Ambassador for OPAPP (Office of the Presidential Advisor on the Peace Process) and Singaporean Tourism Ambassador.
