= The Duke (talk show) =

The Duke is TV magazine talk show cum lifestyle magazine for men, produced by AXN Asia.

It is hosted by Marc Nelson and Rovilson Fernandez, last seen on the 2nd season of The Amazing Race Asia, and Eunice Olsen, Miss Singapore-Universe 2000 and a nominated member of parliament.

Its première season was launched on February 9, 2009, with 13 episodes. Each week centers on a topic of discussion with invited guests and an interview with a Duke-of-the-week, intersperse with lifestyle & travel features.

Episode	Topic	Duke Interview
1	Women, can we live without them?	Allan Zeman; Founder of Hong Kong's party district Lan Kwai Fong
2	Metrosexuality	Dingdong Dantes; Philippines actor-model
3	Secret Fantasies	Dennis Foo; CEO of St. James Power House
4	The Age of Women in Power	Simon Ma; Shanghai-based Hong Kong designer, artist, musician
5	30 Is the New 20	Cyril Takayama; Japanese internationally renowned illusionist
6	Can Money Buy Love?	Alistair Patton; Australian founder of shareholders & members' M1NT clubs
7	Boys Will Be Boys	Khoo Swee Chiow; Singaporean adventurer, author and motivational speaker
8	Married But Available	Dylan Wilk; Philippines-lived British entrepreneur-philanthropist
9	Staying Bad or Being Dad	Russell Wong; Singapore's far-famed celebrity photographer
10	Can Men and Women Be Friends?	Dr. Sheikh Muszaphar Shukor; Malaysia's first astronaut
11	Is It Hip to Be Square?	Dr. Ly Qui Trung; Founder of Vietnam's Pho24 restaurants
12	31 Flavors of Men	Daniel Henney actor-model
13	What Makes a Real Man?	
