= Dyan Castillejo =

Filipino tennis player and sports reporter

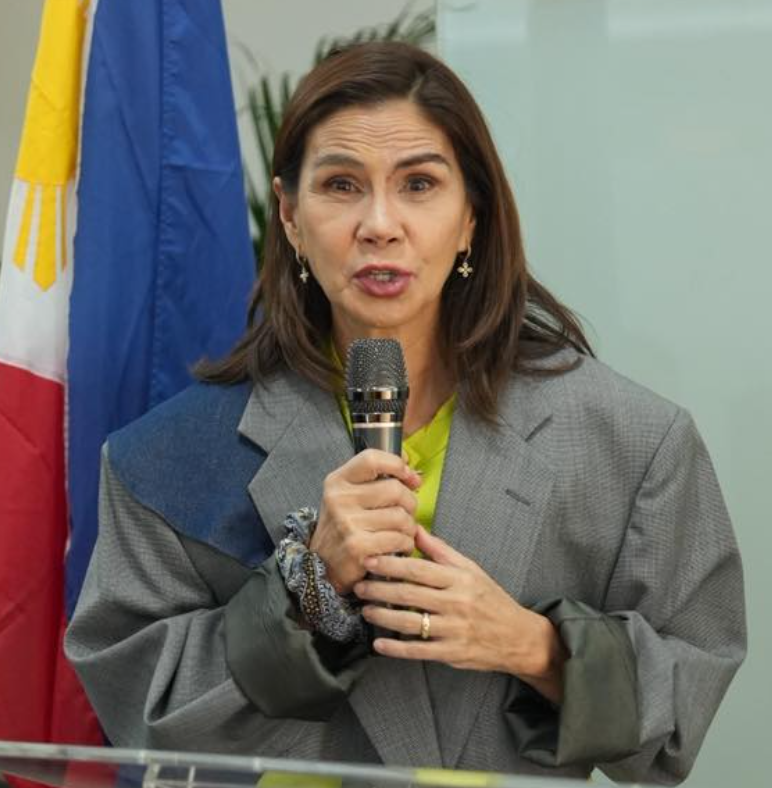
- Castillejo in 2025
- Born: September 15, 1965 (age 61); Quezon City, Philippines
- Other name: Dyan Castillejo-Garcia
- Occupation: Broadcaster
- Years active: 1992–present
- Spouse: Anton Garcia (m. 1999)
- Children: 1
- Tennis career
- Country (sports): Philippines

Singles
- Career record: 7–13

Doubles
- Career record: 5–16
Medal record
Tennis
Representing Philippines
Southeast Asian Games
Silver medal – second place	1981 Manila	Team
Silver medal – second place	1987 Jakarta	Doubles
Bronze medal – third place	1983 Singapore	Team
Bronze medal – third place	1985 Bangkok	Doubles
Bronze medal – third place	1985 Bangkok	Team
Bronze medal – third place	1987 Jakarta	Mixed Doubles
Bronze medal – third place	1987 Jakarta	Team

Dyan Castillejo-Garcia (Tagalog: [dɐˈjan kastilˈjɛho gaɾˈsɪa]; born September 15, 1965) is a Filipino sports journalist and former tennis player.

== Tennis career ==
Castillejo represented the Philippines in the Fed Cup ties from 1981 to 1990. She also competed in the Asian Games, SEA Games, junior Wimbledon, and junior US Open, having won several SEA Games medals from 1981 to 1987. She was also the first Filipino to earn a WTA ranking.

In 2017, Castillejo was conferred the Fed Cup Commitment Award, an award given to players that have played at least 20 World Group ties or 40 ties at any level, by the International Tennis Federation. She was the first Filipino to be given the distinction.

== Post-playing career ==
Castillejo has worked as a sports interviewer for ABS-CBN Sports, interviewing boxer Manny Pacquiao and his opponents. She is also host for a number of TV programs such as The World Tonight, Gym Team, The MBA-Beat, TV Patrol, and Sports Unlimited. She regularly covers the annual Miss Universe pageant for ABS-CBN.

Castillejo has covered tennis player Alexandra Eala since Eala was six years old. Castillejo produced a feature on Eala at age 12 after the latter won the Les Petits As tournament and continued reporting on Eala as she progressed from junior competition to the WTA Tour.

=== Television ===
- The World Tonight (1992–1999)
- Sports Unlimited / Sports U (1997–2020)
- Metropolitan Basketball Association (1998)
- The MBA Beat (1998)

== Personal life ==
Dyan Castillejo's sisters Nina and Sarah were also tennis players. Dyan Castillejo has been married to Anton Garcia, a businessman, since November 20, 1999. She has a son, Matthew, who also plays competitive tennis. Her son won an under-14 national group tournament title in 2016.
