= Asia's Got Talent =

Asian competition television series

- Genre: Interactive talent competition
- Created by: Simon Cowell (Syco)
- Based on: Got Talent franchise
- Directed by: Jonathan Bullen; Jonathan Glazier
- Presented by: Marc Nelson; Rovilson Fernandez; Alan M. Wong; Justin Bratton
- Judges: David Foster; Anggun; Vanness Wu; Melanie C; Jay Park
- Original languages: English (main language); Various (based on local country broadcast)
- No. of seasons: 3
- No. of episodes: 30

Production
- Executive producers: Don Keyte; Jonathan Glazier; Marilyn Tan; John Snoddy
- Producers: Jahan Rahamathulla; Vika Arliany; Glyn Seah; Tiffany Ang; Yin Phua; A. D. Chan; Ashley Hong; Khoo Teng Leang (TL); Mel Wong; Vincent Fong; Sally Lee; Joanne Chua
- Production locations: Auditions: Pinewood Studios, Malaysia; Semifinals: Marina Bay Sands, Singapore (2015); Pinewood Studios, Malaysia (2017–); Finals: Marina Bay Sands, Singapore
- Editors: Amaran Thevarajah; Danial Haris; Jave Loh; Lawerence Nel; Lim Ting Ting; Martyn See; Michael Seetoh; Michelle Sandra; Xinying Lam; Rayner Lim; Jester Alcaraz
- Camera setup: Multi-camera
- Production companies: Sony Pictures Television Networks; Syco; Fremantle Asia

Original release
- Network: AXN Asia
- Release: March 12, 2015 – April 11, 2019

Asia's Got Talent is a televised Asian talent show competition, and part of the global Got Talent franchise created by Simon Cowell. Produced and aired by AXN Asia, it was created in the wake of the successes of both America's Got Talent and Britain's Got Talent, and premiered on March 12, 2015, across 15 countries in Asia. For each season, a contestants of any age can audition for the televised contest with whatever talent they wish to demonstrate, with the winner receiving a prize of $100,000.

Participants face a series of rounds, in which they perform before a panel of judges who have a part in how much they progress, alongside viewers - the current judging panel consists of Anggun, David Foster, and Jay Park. The program is currently presented by actors Alan Wong and Justin Bratton. It is currently the only program in the Got Talent franchise to broadcast multiple languages; translators are provided for some participants if they cannot speak English and the judges are not fluent in their native tongue.

== History ==
After being acquired by AXN Asia, work began on producing an Asian version of the Got Talent franchise during late 2014 and early 2015. Officially announced on 15 January 2015, the judges for the first season consisted of Anggun, David Foster, Melanie C, and Vanness Wu. Over a week later, on 24 January, Marc Nelson and Rovilson Fernandez were announced as the hosts of the show. The program proved popular with viewers, but received no second season until two years later. By then, the format was changed slightly. Foster and Anggun decided to stay on while Melanie C and Vanness opted to drop out, leading to Jay Park being recruited as a new judge and the panel lacking a fourth judge. In addition, Nelson and Fernandez did not return, leading to Alan Wong and Justin Bratton being contracted to appear as the new hosts. By the beginning of the second season, interest for entry as a participant led to acts coming from around 28 countries to appear on the program, up from 15 countries in the first season.

=== Judges and Hosts ===
Season	Host	Judges (in order of first appearance)			
1	Marc Nelson & Rovilson Fernandez	Anggun	David Foster	Melanie C	Vanness Wu
2	Alan Wong & Justin Bratton	Anggun	David Foster	Jay Park	
3	Alan Wong & Justin Bratton	Anggun	David Foster	Jay Park	

== Season summary ==
Season	Premiere	Finale	Winner	Runner-up	Third place	Host(s)	Judges
1	March 12, 2015	May 14, 2015	El Gamma Penumbra	Khusugtun	Gerphil Geraldine Flores	Marc Nelson; Rovilson Fernandez	David Foster; Anggun; Vanness Wu; Melanie C
2	October 12, 2017	December 14, 2017	The Sacred Riana	DM-X Comvaleñoz	Neil Rey Garcia Llanes	Alan Wong; Justin Bratton	David Foster; Anggun; Jay Park
3	February 7, 2019	April 11, 2019	Eric Chien	Yaashwin Sarawanan	Power Duo	Alan Wong; Justin Bratton	David Foster; Anggun; Jay Park

=== Season 1 (2015) ===
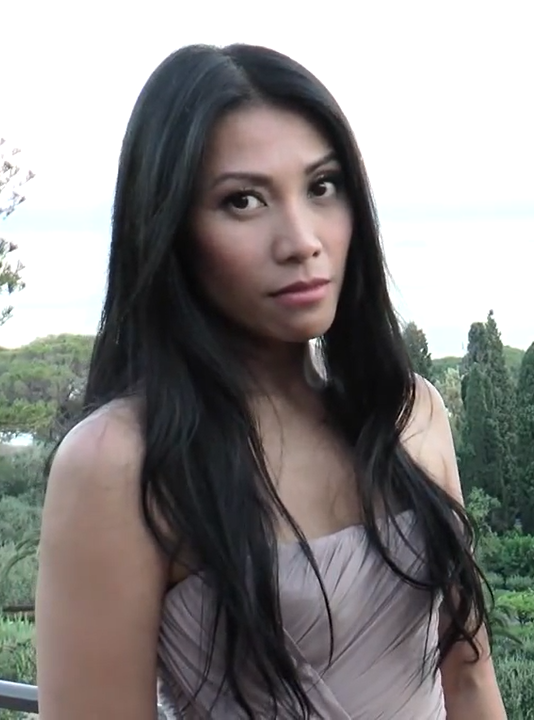
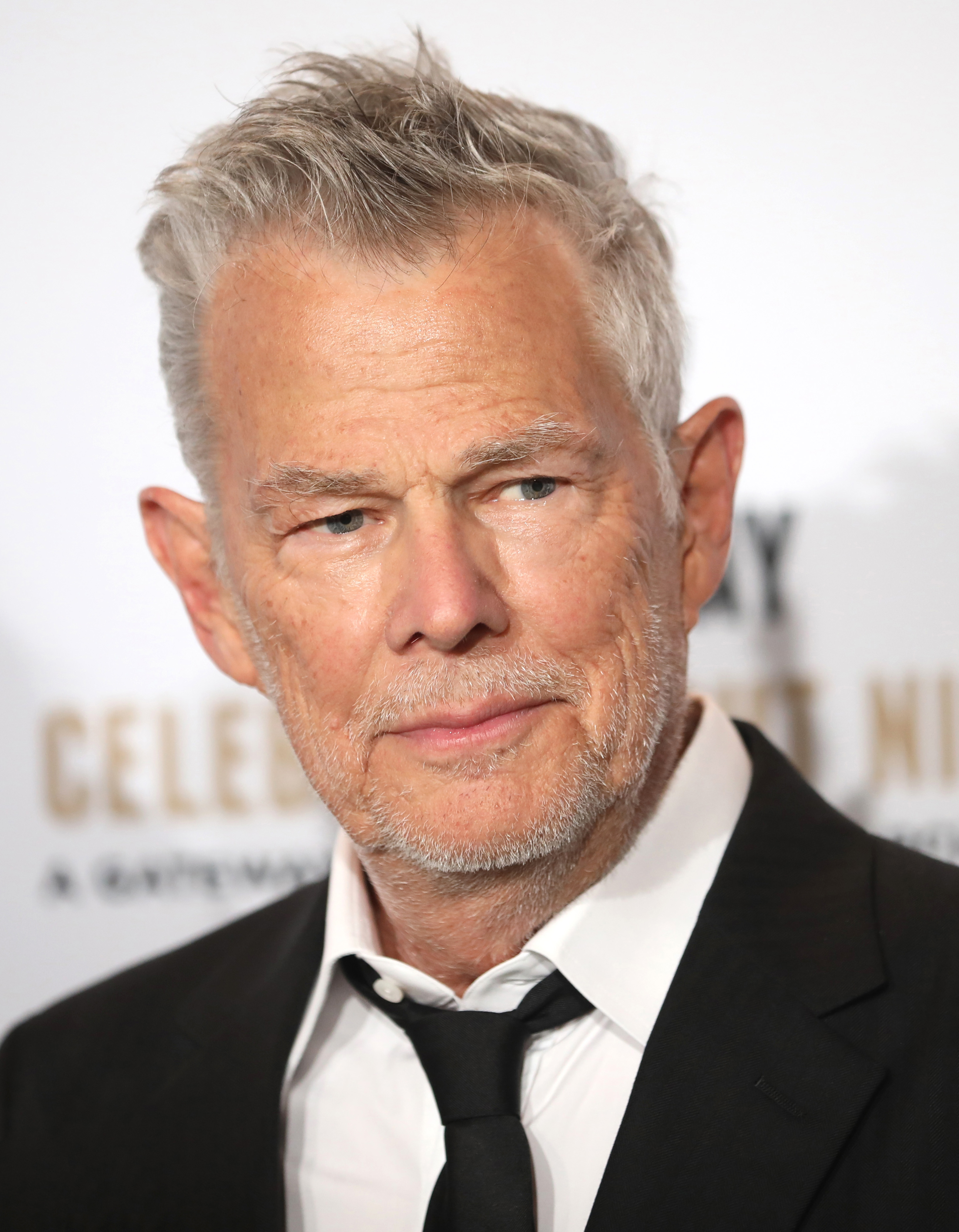
Anggun and David Foster have served as judges on all seasons of Asia's Got Talent.

In 2014, AXN Asia acquired the franchise to create Asia's Got Talent. Open auditions were held in various cities in later that year.

On January 13, 2015, the judging panel was revealed, consisting of David Foster, Anggun, Vanness Wu of F4, and Melanie C of the Spice Girls. Marc Nelson and Rovilson Fernandez were announced as the hosts.

The judges' audition were recorded at the Pinewood Iskandar Malaysia Studios. The semifinals and finals were held at the Marina Bay Sands at Singapore. The live shows were taped a few hours before the schedule airing of the show to put subtitles as not all contestants speak fluently in English. The inaugural season started airing on March 12, 2015. El Gamma Penumbra, a shadow play group, was hailed as the first winner of the show. Khusugtun, Gerphil Flores, and The Talento ended up at second, third, and fourth places, respectively.

Due to the delayed airing of the final results show, a photo was posted on Instagram where El Gamma Penumbra is on the stage with the golden buzzer background and confetti; captioned the group as the winners. This caused a dismay among the netizens due to its spoiler nature.

=== Season 2 (2017) ===
In third week of May 2015, Asia's Got Talent announced the pre-registration for Season 2 on its official Facebook page. The launch of the second season was finally announced in the second week of January 2017 after the success of the fifth season of The Amazing Race Asia.

On July 28, 2017, Jay Park was announced as the new judge, joining David Foster and Anggun who both returned from the first season. Alan Wong and Justin Bratton were also introduced as the new hosts of the show.

The judges' audition were taped starting July 28, 2017 at the Pinewood Iskandar Malaysia Studios. Unlike the previous season, the semifinals were taped from the last week of September until the first week of October at the same studio. The second season started airing on October 12, 2017. The season was won by the spooky magician The Sacred Riana, with dance group DM-X Comvaleñoz, beatboxer Neil Rey Garcia Llanes, and digital dancer Canion Shijirbat finishing at second, third, and fourth places, respectively.

=== Season 3 (2019) ===
On May 14, 2018, AXN Asia announced the third season of the show, followed by the opening of the online auditions two days later. Open auditions were held in major cities, including Bangkok, Singapore, Manila, Ho Chi Minh, Jakarta, and Kuala Lumpur. On July 9, 2018, it was announced that the online auditions were extended for another week until July 16, 2018.

On September 16, 2018, it was announced that all judges and hosts from the previous season will return this year.

The judges' audition were taped from September 19 to 27, 2018 at the Pinewood Iskandar Malaysia Studios, like the previous seasons. The semifinals were taped on December 6, 10, and 13, 2018 at the same studio. It started airing on February 7, 2019. The season was won by magician Eric Chien, with human calculator Yaashwin Sarawanan, contemporary acrobatic dancers Power Duo, and hip-hop dance group Maniac Family finishing at second, third, and fourth places, respectively.

== Broadcast ==
Aside from being broadcast via AXN Asia, FremantleAsia also secured deals for the program to be aired across various free-to-air channels in Thailand, Vietnam, Indonesia and India, after its original airing. The following lists where broadcast of Asia's Got Talent is allowed:

Country	Local Title	Network	Premiere date	Timeslot	Backstage host(s)
Indonesia	Asia's Got Talent	antv	Season 1 March 15, 2015; Season 2 October 15, 2017	Season 1 Sunday, 06.00 PM; Season 2 Sunday, 11.15 AM	Season 1 Indra Bekti; Shaheer Sheikh; Mikha Tambayong (Note: Shaheer only hosting until semifinal, on final Shaheer replaced by Mikha Tambayong.); Season 2 Indra Herlambang; Agatha Valerie
Thailand	เอเชียก็อตทาเลนต์	BEC Multimedia	Season 1 March 15, 2015	Season 1 Sunday, 08.15 PM (Premiere episode on 3 SD); Monday, 09.30 AM (Encore on Ch3 and 3 HD); Saturday, 04.00 PM (Encore on 3 Family)	Season 1 Victor Zheng
Vietnam	Tìm kiếm tài năng Châu Á	VTV	Season 1 March 15, 2015	Season 1 Sunday & Monday, 07.55 PM (Premiere episode on VTV6); Monday & Tuesday 11.00 AM (Encore on VTV3)	Season 1 Phạm Hồng Thúy Vân
Vietnam	Tìm kiếm tài năng Châu Á	HTV3	Season 2 October 14, 2017	Season 2 & 3 Saturday, 08.00 PM; Monday, 11.00 AM (2 days after AXN broadcast the episode)	N/A
Vietnam	Tìm kiếm tài năng Châu Á	HTV3	Season 3 February 16, 2019	Season 2 & 3 Saturday, 08.00 PM; Monday, 11.00 AM (2 days after AXN broadcast the episode)	N/A
India	Asia's Got Talent	VH1 India (Note: VH1 India will broadcast selected auditions, semifinals, and finals only.)	Season 1 April 18, 2015	Season 1 Saturday & Sunday, 09.00 PM IST	N/A

== Awards and nominations ==
2015 Asian Television Awards

- Won: Best Adaptation of an Existing Format
- Highly Commended: Best General Entertainment Programme
- Nominated: Best Reality Show
