= Sports Unlimited =

- Genre: Sports; Documentary
- Created by: ABS-CBN Corporation
- Developed by: ABS-CBN News & Current Affairs
- Written by: Jake Aspiras
- Directed by: JV Noriega
- Presented by: Dyan Castillejo; Vince Hizon; Marc Nelson
- Country of origin: Philippines
- Original languages: Filipino; English
- No. of episodes: 1,173

Production
- Executive producer: Jonas Liwag
- Editors: Ramoncito Baltazar; Walter Soriaga
- Running time: 30 minutes

Original release
- Network: ABS-CBN
- Release: June 14, 1997 – February 7, 2015
- Release: February 12, 2015 – April 30, 2020

Sports Unlimited (now Sports U) is a Philippine sports docu-News magazine program broadcast by ABS-CBN, Originally hosted by Dyan Castillejo and Vince Hizon. The program features different kinds of sports, as well as ordinary and prominent sports figures. It is the longest-running sports program in the Philippines and in Asia. Castillejo served as the final host

Sports Unlimited originally aired on ABS-CBN every Saturday nights from June 14, 1997 to February 7, 2015. Replay telecasts also aired on S+A every Sunday at 6:30 PM, and on ANC every Sunday at 11:30 PM. It also airs worldwide via TFC.

On February 12, 2015, the program is reformatted as Sports U, and originally aired on ABS-CBN's Kapamilya Gold afternoon block replacing the Thursday timeslot of TNT: Tapatan ni Tunying. On December 10, 2015, the program moved to late-nights and currently airs every Thursday right after Bandila. ANC and S+A (along with early broadcast from DZMM TeleRadyo) retain their simulcast.

== Hosts ==
Main host

- Dyan Castillejo (1997–2020)

Former hosts

- Vince Hizon (1997–2003)
- Marc Nelson (2003–2015)

== Background ==
Sports Unlimited is a sports program that was every aired Saturdays on ABS-CBN since 1997.

It is the first sports show of its kind in the country, which combines adventure, sports, and travel, while featuring current sports events, sports features, latest in health and fitness trends, and an up-close on sports personalities and other celebrities.

Sports Unlimited aims to inform Filipinos about what sports are available in the country other than what is normally seen on television like basketball, baseball, golf or boxing. The show seeks to promote adventure tourism, sports and healthy living to Filipino viewers. It also strives to honor athletes when they have achieved success in local and international competition.

Ultimately, its message is to encourage a sporty and active lifestyle especially to the youth.

== Awards and recognitions ==
- Winner, Best Sports-Oriented Show - PMPC Star Awards for Television (1999, 2003, 2005 and 2006)
- Hall of Fame, 2009 Catholic Mass Media Awards
- Best Sports Show, 2005, 2006, 2008 Catholic Mass Media Awards
- Winner, Best Sports Program (2008) 6th Gawad Tanglaw
- Winner, Best Sports Program (2009) 7th Gawad Tanglaw
- Winner, Best Sports Anchors (2010) 8th Gawad Tanglaw (Dyan Castillejo, Marc Nelson, Tommy Manotoc, Jr.)
- Winner, Best Sports Program (2010) 19th Golden Dove Award
- Winner, Best Sports Program (2011) 9th Gawad Tanglaw
- Winner, Best Sports Program (2012) 10th Gawad Tanglaw
- Winner, Best Sports Program (2012) 20th Golden Dove Award
- Winner, Best Sports Show (2012) 8th USTv Students’ Choice Awards
- Winner, Best Sports Program (2013) 11th Gawad Tanglaw
- Winner, Best Sports Program (2013) 21st Golden Dove Award
- Winner, Best Sports Program (2014) 10th USTv Students’ Choice Awards
- Winner, Students' Choice of Sports Personality - Dyan Castillejo (2014) 8th USTv Students' Choice Awards
- Winner, Best Sports Program (2014) 22nd Golden Dove Award

== See also ==
- List of programs broadcast by ABS-CBN
