= Marc Nelson (entertainer) =

Television presenter in the Philippines

- Born: Marc Saw Nelson; Sydney, Australia
- Occupations: Host; model
- Years active: 1997–present

Marc Saw Nelson, better known as Marc Nelson, is a Burmese and Australian television host and model mostly credited for being one of Philippine television's most visible and prominent personalities.

== Personal life ==
Nelson was born in Sydney, Australia. His mother has Anglo-Burmese blood, born in Scotland and raised in Burma and Thailand, while his father is of Burmese Chinese origin but migrated to Australia. He graduated from Macquarie University, Sydney Australia with a Science Degree in human geography, a course similar to social anthropology.

Since the age of 7, Nelson and his family have been traveling and living in all of the flung corners of the globe. He has managed to visit over 40 countries and lived in seven of them. After living in such diverse countries as Tanzania, Kenya, Hong Kong, Canada as well as his native Australia, Nelson found his true calling in the Philippines.

Nelson was formerly linked to actress Patricia Javier. He was also linked to Miss Earth 2004 Priscilla Meirelles, where he was the host/presenter of Miss Earth 2004, Priscilla's winning pageant; to model Paula Taylor, whom he met during the Amazing Race Asia stint; and to model Samantha Lewis.

== Career ==
Nelson started modelling in the late 1990s. He was part of commercial on SunSilk Nutrient Shampoo for Slow Growing Hair as a photographer, He took on the ramp, graced billboards and print ads, and appeared on TV commercials. He eventually made a name for himself as a TV host, taking on shows such as the then-ABC5 (now TV5) dance program Eezy Dancing and ABS-CBN's Sports Unlimited. Due to his recognition and skill as a host he is much in demand when it comes to hosting events and pageants. He has hosted the Elite Model Search, Manhunt International, Miss Teen Philippines, Mutya ng Pilipinas as well as the Miss Earth beauty pageant on more than one occasion. Other pageants, awards nights and events are constantly being added to his roster.

=== The Amazing Race Asia 2 ===
Nelson and his "best buddy", Rovilson Fernandez are most noted for competing in the second season of the AXN reality show, The Amazing Race Asia. They hold the record for the most consecutive leg placing, finishing 1st from leg 2 to leg 8 and again in leg 11.

They finished in 3rd place in Singapore, after Fernandez faltered at the final task, a Roadblock, despite being the first to commence the task. It involves arranging of flags of the countries they had visited.

=== Post-Amazing Race Asia 2 ===
After competing in The Amazing Race Asia 2, Nelson and Fernandez hosted the magazine talk show, The Duke, on AXN in 2009. In March 2015, the duo partnered again as hosts for Asia's Got Talent, also on AXN.

== Filmography ==
=== Television ===
Year	Title	Role	Network
2003–2015	Sports Unlimited	Host	ABS-CBN
2007–2008	The Amazing Race Asia 2	Contestant	AXN
2009	Dare Duo	Host	QTV 11
2009	The Duke	Host	AXN
2015	Asia's Got Talent	Host	AXN
2018	Beached	Host	Metro Channel
