= Podolí Swimming Stadium =

Coordinates: 50.0513°N 14.4174°E

- Plavecký stadion Podolí
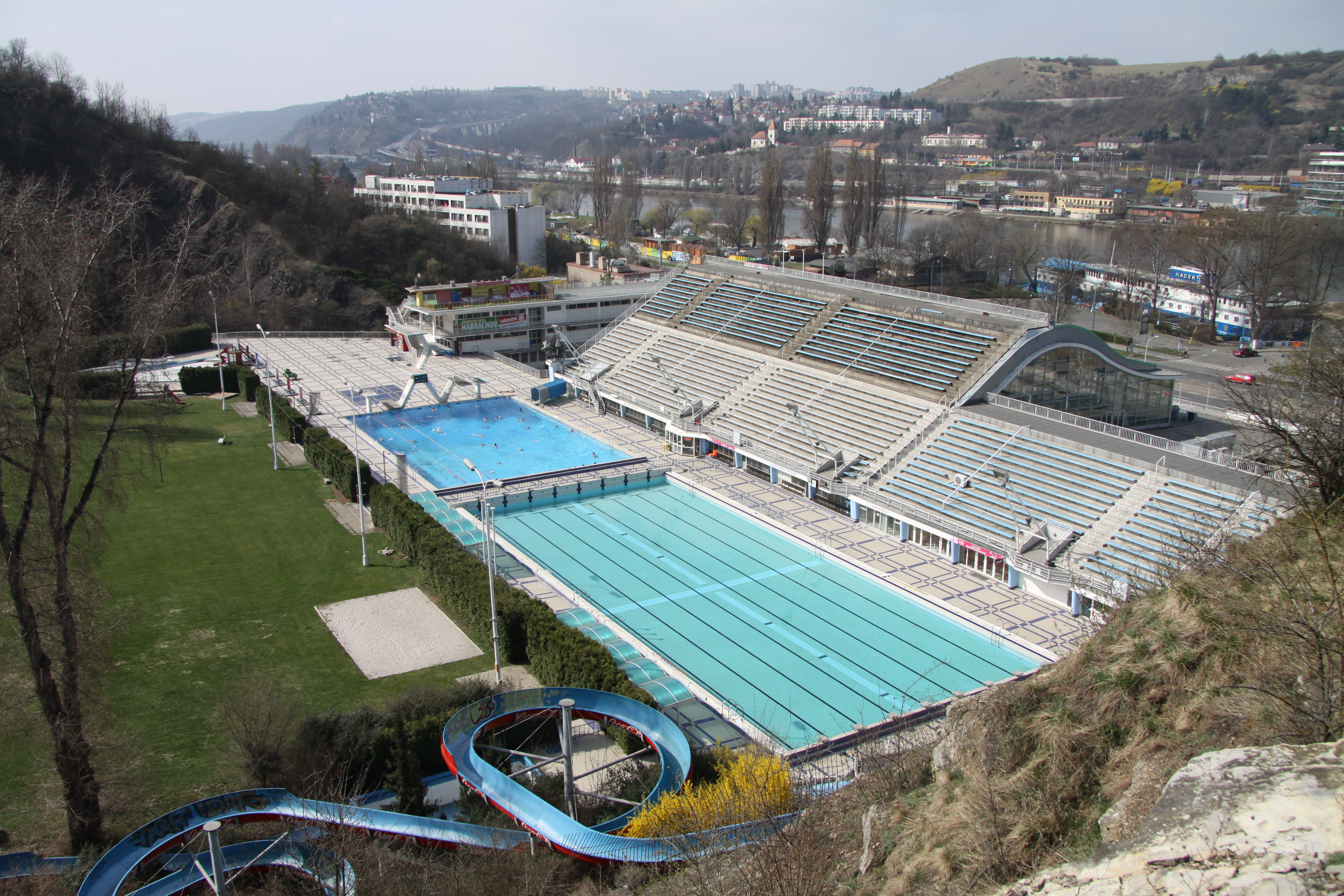
- Podolí Swimming Stadium viewed from Kavčí hory
- Interactive map of the Podolí Swimming Stadium area

General information
- Location: Podolí, Prague 4
- Construction started: 1959
- Completed: 1965
- Renovated: 2000–2001

Design and construction
- Architect: Richard Podzemný

Other information
- Seating capacity: 5000

Podolí Swimming Stadium (in Czech: Plavecký stadion Podolí) is a swimming centre in Prague, Czech Republic, which is located on the right side of Vltava river in Podolí neighborhood. It contains two 50 meter-long pools (outside and inside), 33 meter pool for water polo, spa or other facilities including seating for 5000 spectators. It was built between 1959 and 1965 on the site of a former mine. Design of the complex, symbolizing a big water wave, was created by a Czech architect Richard Podzemný.

The complex had an average of around 2500 visitors daily in 2015.
