= Vrtba Garden =

Garden in Prague, Czechia

Coordinates: 50°5′11.12″N 14°24′8.4″E

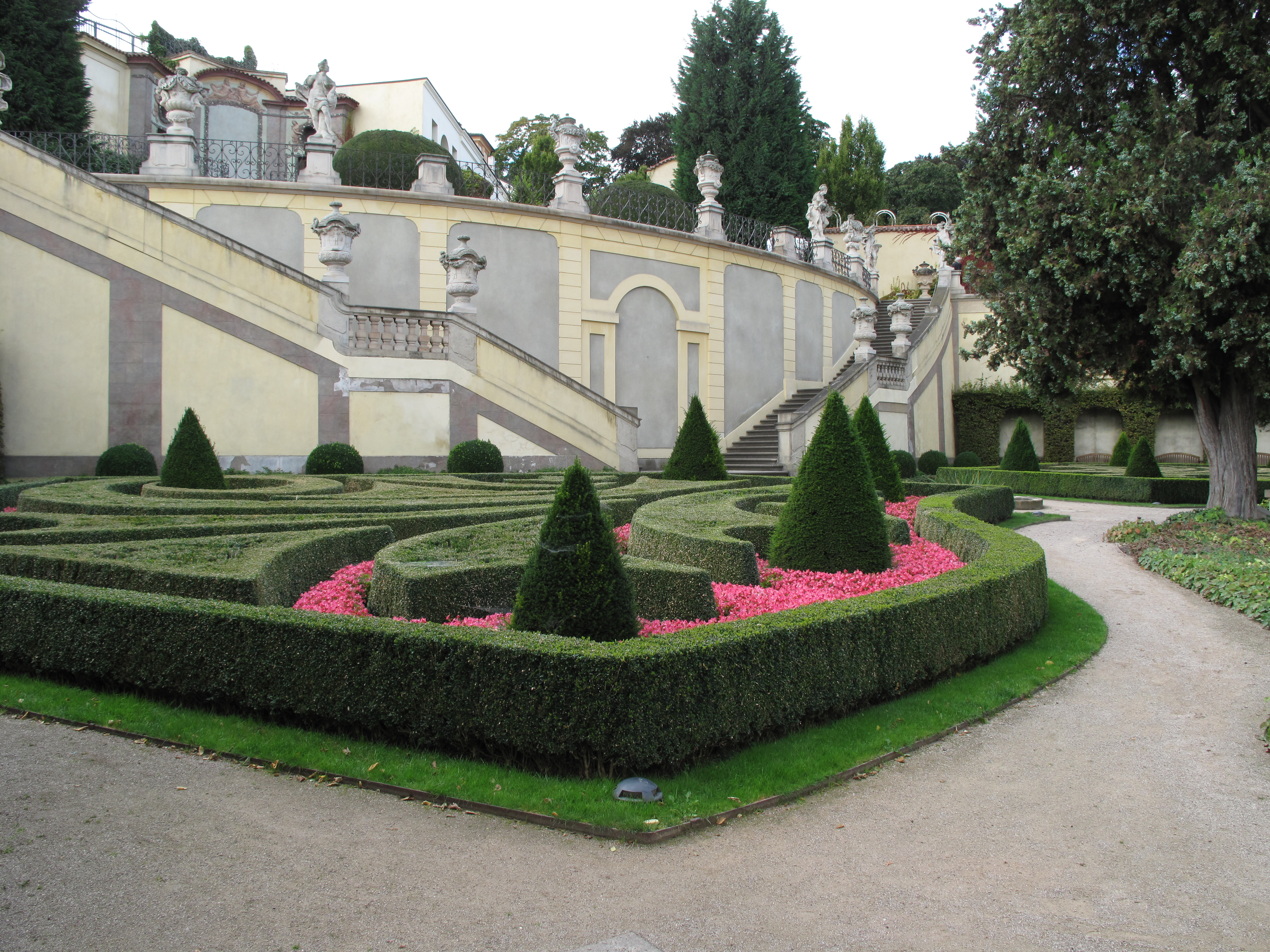

The Vrtba Garden (Czech: Vrtbovská zahrada) in Prague is one of several fine High Baroque gardens in the Czech capital. Like three other Baroque gardens (the Vratislav, Schönborn, and Lobkowicz palace gardens) the Vrtba Garden is situated on the slope of Petřín Hill, in the Malá Strana section of the city. In the midst of an expansive moment in Prague's history during the 1710s and 1720s, the garden was laid out by František Maxmilián Kaňka, who was renovating the Vrtba palace for Jan Josef, Count of Vrtba. Though the palace has undergone extensive reconstructions in the succeeding centuries, the garden retained its Baroque features and the original statuary and sculptural decor by Matyáš Bernard Braun.

In addition, the fresco interiors of the Sala Terrena that links palace and garden, executed by Václav Vavřinec Reiner, have also survived. Facing the Sala Terrena across a central pool is a matching former aviary.

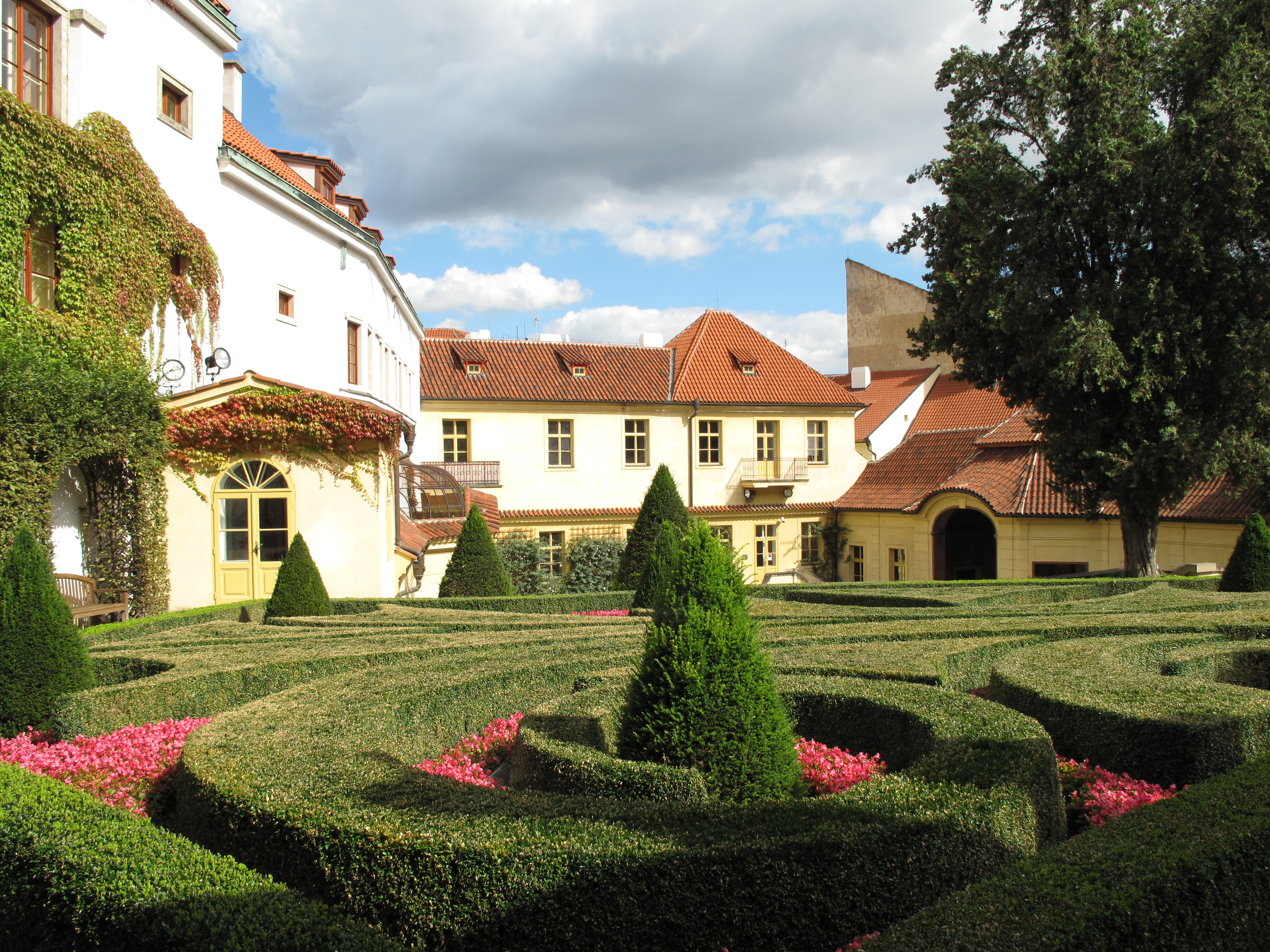

Between 1990 and 1998 the Vrtba Garden underwent structural conservation and extensive replanting and was reopened for public in June 1998.

The formal garden in the French style laid out in clipped scrolling asymmetrical broderies of boxwood in gravel on three terraced levels makes use of an irregular steep slope more characteristic of Italian garden sites, in a cramped space that was already densely built over when the garden was established. It is listed for its historic cultural values by UNESCO.

Today the garden is entered from the base, through a discreet gate in Karmelitská Street. It is often used as a venue for weddings, receptions and other celebrations.

== See also ==
- List of gardens
