= The Amazing Race Asia 4 =

- Season 4
- The Amazing Race Asia logo for season 4
- Presented by: Allan Wu
- No. of teams: 10
- Winners: Richard Hardin & Richard Herrera
- No. of legs: 11
- Distance traveled: 38,000 km (24,000 mi)
- No. of episodes: 11 (13 including racers revealed & recap)

Release
- Original network: AXN Asia
- Original release: 23 September – 9 December 2010

Additional information
- Filming dates: 10 June – 30 June 2010

Series chronology
- ← Previous; Season 3 Next → Season 5

The Amazing Race Asia 4 is the fourth season of The Amazing Race Asia, an Asian reality competition show based on the American series The Amazing Race. Hosted by Allan Wu, it featured ten teams of two, each with a pre-existing relationship, in a race around Asia and the Pacific Rim to win US$100,000. This season visited two continents and eight countries and travelled over 38,000 kilometres (24,000 mi) during eleven legs. Starting in Kuala Lumpur, teams travelled through Malaysia, Sri Lanka, the Philippines, New Zealand, Australia, Indonesia and South Korea before finishing in Singapore. This season was the first time a season within the Amazing Race franchise was filmed and broadcast for high-definition television. The season premiered on AXN Asia on 23 September 2010 and the finale aired on 9 December 2010.

Filipino friends Richard Hardin and Richard Herrera were the winners of this season, while Singaporean rebel pals Claire Goh and Michelle Ng finished in second place and Indonesian father and daughter Hussein and Natasha Sutadisastra finished in third place.

== Production ==
=== Development and filming ===
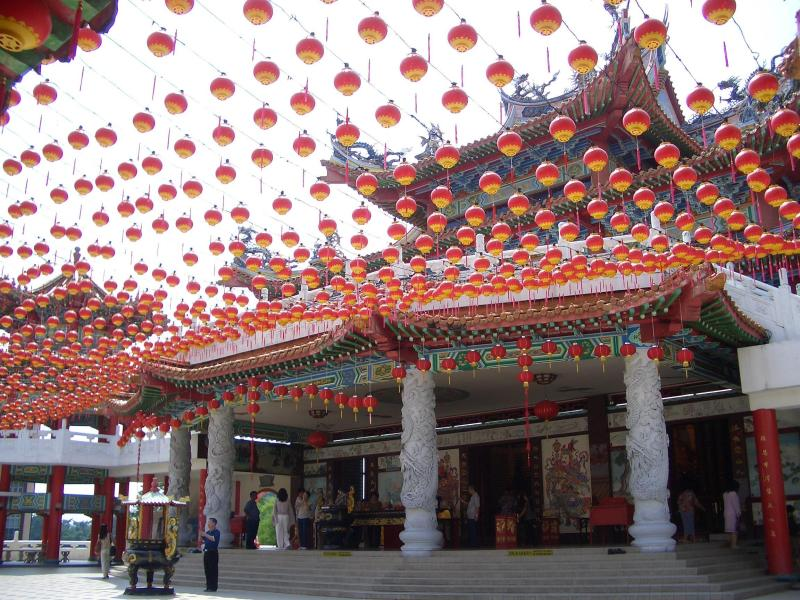
The Starting Line was at Thean Hou Temple in Kuala Lumpur, Malaysia.

The fourth season of The Amazing Race Asia was the first Amazing Race season to be broadcast in high-definition. Besides the switch to high-definition, updated on-screen graphics (similar in appearance to those introduced in season 14 of the American version) and music, were introduced. The opening intro was also updated with a new title card and tuneup in the music. Of note is the addition of the use of split-screens.

Filming took place in June 2010, with teams spotted at Invercargill Airport on 20 June 2010.

According to AXN, this season was dubbed as "Ride of a Lifetime". Allan noted that this season will travel to exotic locations and feature new challenges. This season features a first-time visit to Sri Lanka, as well as visits to far-flung areas including Invercargill, New Zealand and Legazpi, Philippines. Indonesia, a previously visited country that had not been visited by original American edition at the time until the nineteenth season one year later, was also visited this season.

Leg 5 was said to be the most expensive production to date. This is the first season in the Asian franchise to start and end in two different countries, starting in Kuala Lumpur, Malaysia and ending in Singapore, albeit having close proximity of the two locations. In some foreign editions, starting and ending locations are in different countries (such as Brazil, Israel and Latin America), but not in the original American edition, which starts and ends in the same country until season 34.

Lani Pillinger was absent in the Finish Line due to a broken collar bone.

=== Casting ===
Applications ended 31 March 2010, after a short extension due to popular demand. Semi-finalist and finalist interviews were held between March and April.

== Release ==
=== Broadcast ===
A week before the premiere of "Racers Revealed", the episode was released on the show's official website. The first episode also premiered on the show's official website on 16 September 2010, one week before the season debut. A special recap episode was aired on 2 December 2010, a week before the season finale.

=== Marketing ===
The fourth season of The Amazing Race Asia had three official sponsors: Axiata, Caltex, and Sony. The official hotel partner was Hilton, and the series was supported by Tourism Malaysia and Mix FM.

== Cast ==
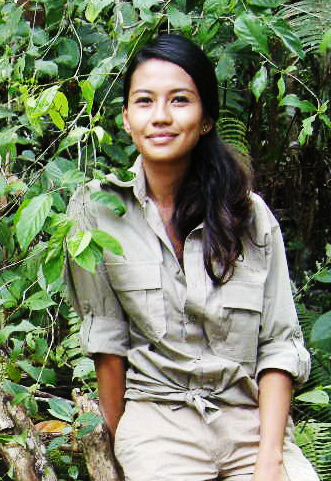
Nadine Zamira

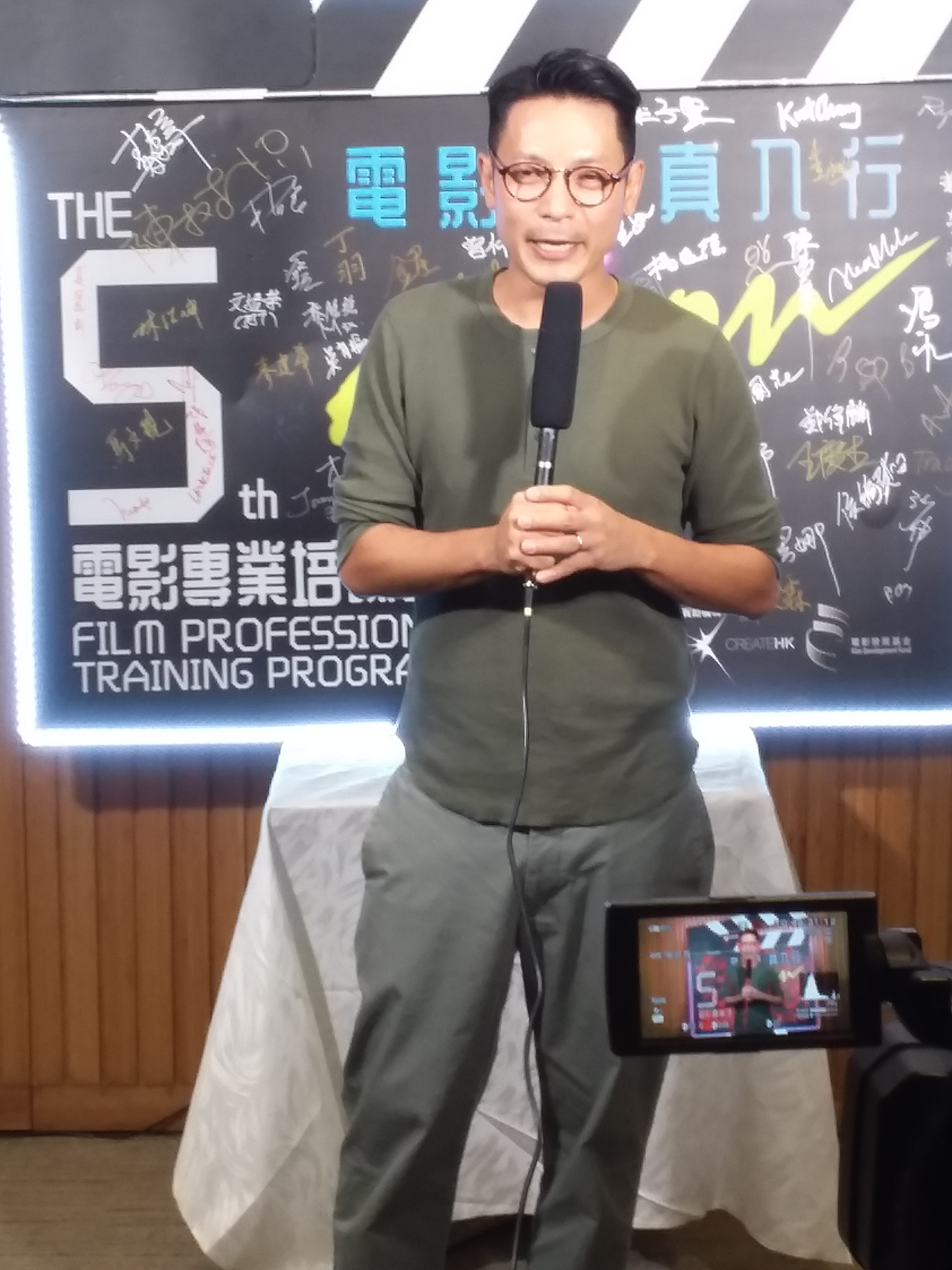
Alan Luk

The ten teams were revealed on 2 September 2010. Season 4's cast included the show's first father-daughter team, as well as martial arts experts, tattooists, social workers, and musicians. Like in previous Asian editions, this season features a large number of media personalities or their relatives. Wendy was a finalist in Miss Hong Kong 2006, Nadine was Miss Indonesia Earth 2009, while Natasha was Miss South Jakarta 2007. Dimple is a Hindi soap actress who starred in the serial Aathvaan Vachan, while her friend Sunaina is an Indian TV actress, who starred in Dill Mill Gayye, as well as a movie actress who starred in the Hindi movie Kyun! Ho Gaya Na.... Manas finished runner-up as a contestant on the Indian reality-dating show Rakhi Ka Swayamwar, similar in format to The Bachelorette of the American series. Jess & Lani, as well as Richard Herrera, have appeared in numerous media and print advertisements and commercials in the Philippines. Richard Hardin is a former pro-basketball player in the Philippine Basketball Association. Claire is a prominent bar musician who plays at numerous gigs around Singapore, while Michelle was a reality TV contestant on the Singaporean series S Factor. At the ages of 21 and 22 respectively, Claire & Michelle also form the youngest team in Amazing Race Asia history.

This season featured five non-Asians, Ivan, who is from Hungary and raced with his Malaysian wife Hilda, Jacinta "Jess" James & Lani Pillinger are from Australia (though Lani is of Filipino ethnicity) and Richard (Hardin) & Richard (Herrera) are from the United States who are first generation Filipino Americans but raised in Columbus, Ohio. This was the first time that Thailand was not represented this season.

Contestants	Age	Relationship	Hometown	Status
Nadine Zamira	26	Best Friends	Jakarta, Indonesia	Eliminated 1st (in Kota Kinabalu, Malaysia)
Yani Hidranto	28	Best Friends	Jakarta, Indonesia	Eliminated 1st (in Kota Kinabalu, Malaysia)
Alan Luk	32	Dating	Hong Kong, China	Eliminated 2nd (in Kalutara, Sri Lanka)
Wendy Lee	24	Dating	Hong Kong, China	Eliminated 2nd (in Kalutara, Sri Lanka)
Sahil Banga	25	Cousins	New Delhi, India	Eliminated 3rd (in Bacacay, Philippines)
Manas Katyal	23	Cousins	New Delhi, India	Eliminated 3rd (in Bacacay, Philippines)
Ivan Evetovics	33	Married	Kuching, Malaysia	Eliminated 4th (in Queenstown, New Zealand)
Tengku Hilda	38	Married	Kuching, Malaysia	Eliminated 4th (in Queenstown, New Zealand)
Sunaina Gulia	31	Best Friends	Haryana, India	Eliminated 5th (in Brisbane, Australia)
Dimple Inamdar	32	Best Friends	Mumbai, India	Eliminated 5th (in Brisbane, Australia)
Ethan Koh Hon	26	Friends	Kuala Lumpur, Malaysia	Eliminated 6th (in Gili Trawangan, Indonesia)
Mohamad Khairie	25	Friends	Kuala Lumpur, Malaysia	Eliminated 6th (in Gili Trawangan, Indonesia)
Jess James	27	Party Girls	Manila, Philippines	Eliminated 7th (in Gyeongju, South Korea)
Lani Pillinger	27	Party Girls	Manila, Philippines	Eliminated 7th (in Gyeongju, South Korea)
Hussein Sutadisastra	53	Father & Daughter	Jakarta, Indonesia	Third Place
Natasha Sutadisastra	24	Father & Daughter	Jakarta, Indonesia	Third Place
Claire Goh	21	Rebel Pals	Singapore	Second Place
Michelle Ng	22	Rebel Pals	Singapore	Second Place
Richard Hardin	34	Friends	Manila, Philippines	Winners
Richard Herrera	31	Friends	Manila, Philippines	Winners

== Results ==
The following teams participated in the season, with their relationships at the time of filming. Placements are listed in finishing order.

- A red placement with a dagger (†) indicates that the team was eliminated.
- A blue placement with a double-dagger (‡) indicates that the team was the last to arrive at a Pit Stop in a non-elimination leg, and was marked for elimination; if the team did not place 1st in the next leg, they would receive a 30-minute penalty.
- An italicized and underlined placement indicates that the team was the last to arrive at a Pit Stop, but there was no rest period at the Pit Stop and all teams were instructed to continue racing.
- A green ƒ indicates that the team won a Fast Forward.
- A violet + indicates that the teams encountered an Intersection.
- A brown > indicates that the team chose to use the Yield, and a brown < indicates the team who received it.
- A brown ⊃ indicates that the team chose to use a U-Turn, and a ⊂ indicates the team who received it.

Team placement (by leg)
Team	1	2 (Note: Five of the 10 teams arrived at the Pit Stop after incurring 4-hour penalties for failing to complete the Roadblock on time (Alan, Claire, Yani, Jess, and Natasha). The initial placements for all teams are as follows (the five italicized teams were not given the penalty): 1st: Alan & Wendy; 2nd: Ivan & Hilda; 3rd: Richard & Richard; 4th: Claire & Michelle; 5th: Dimple & Sunaina; 6th: Sahil & Manas; 7th: Yani & Nadine; (Note: Yani & Nadine were further issued their 30-minute penalty for being marked for elimination and not arriving 1st. Jess & Lani and Hussein & Natasha were moved up to 8th and 9th, respectively, while Yani & Nadine were dropped to last place, which resulted in their elimination.) 8th: Jess & Lani; 9th: Hussein & Natasha; 10th: Ethan & Khairie)	3	4	5+ (Note: This leg featured an Intersection. The teams were paired up thusly: Ethan & Khairie and Claire & Michelle, Richard & Richard and Dimple & Sunaina, Jess & Lani and Ivan & Hilda, and Hussein & Natasha and Sahil & Manas.)	6	7	8	9	10	11
Richard & Richard	2nd	2nd	6th	1stƒ (Note: This team won the Fast Forward in this particular leg.)	2nd	1st	2nd	2nd	4th	2nd	1st
Claire & Michelle	3rd	7th	4th< (Note: Dimple & Sunaina used the Yield against Claire & Michelle.)	7th	3rd	3rd⊃ (Note: Claire & Michelle used the U-Turn against Dimple & Sunaina.)	3rd	4th	3rd	3rd	2nd
Hussein & Natasha	9th	9th	2nd	5th	7th	2nd	6th (Note: In the Roadblocks of Leg 7 and Leg 11, Hussein chose to forfeit the respective Roadblocks and he & Natasha took a 4-hour penalty at the locations of those tasks.)	5th	2nd	1st	3rd
Jess & Lani	8th	8th	7th	4th	5th	4th	1st	1st	1st	4th†	
Ethan & Khairie	1st	5th	5th	3rd	1st	5th (Note: Ethan & Khairie departed the Pit Stop last at the start of Leg 6, as they were flown by helicopter directly to Legazpi Airport as part of the prize won on the previous leg.)	4th	3rd	5th†		
Dimple & Sunaina	4th	3rd	1st>	2nd	4th	6th⊂	5th	6th† (Note: During Leg 8, Dimple & Sunaina had fallen so far behind that all the other teams had already checked into the Pit Stop right after they began the Detour task; they were later shown coming to the Pit Stop for their elimination. In a post-show interview, they confirmed they had completed the Detour prior to being eliminated.)			
Ivan & Hilda	6th	1st	3rd	6th	6th	7th†					
Sahil & Manas	7th	4th	8th (Note: Sahil & Manas initially arrived 7th, but did not pay their tuk-tuk fare correctly. They had to settle the fare before they were allowed to check-in. Jess & Lani, who checked-in ahead of Sahil & Manas as 8th, were moved up to 7th place, while Sahil & Manas were dropped to 8th.)	8th	8th†						
Alan & Wendy	5th	6th	9th‡	9th† (Note: Alan & Wendy had been marked for elimination. However, since they checked-in last, they were eliminated without being issued the 30-minute penalty.)							
Yani & Nadine	10th‡	10th†									

== Race summary ==
Complete route map. Note: the green dot represents both the starting point and transfer point in the third leg.

Destinations	Air travel Rail travel Water travel Bus travel Helicopter travel Bicycle travel Gondola travel
Route Markers	Detour Roadblock Fast Forward Yield Intersection U-Turn Pit Stop

=== Leg 1 (Malaysia) ===
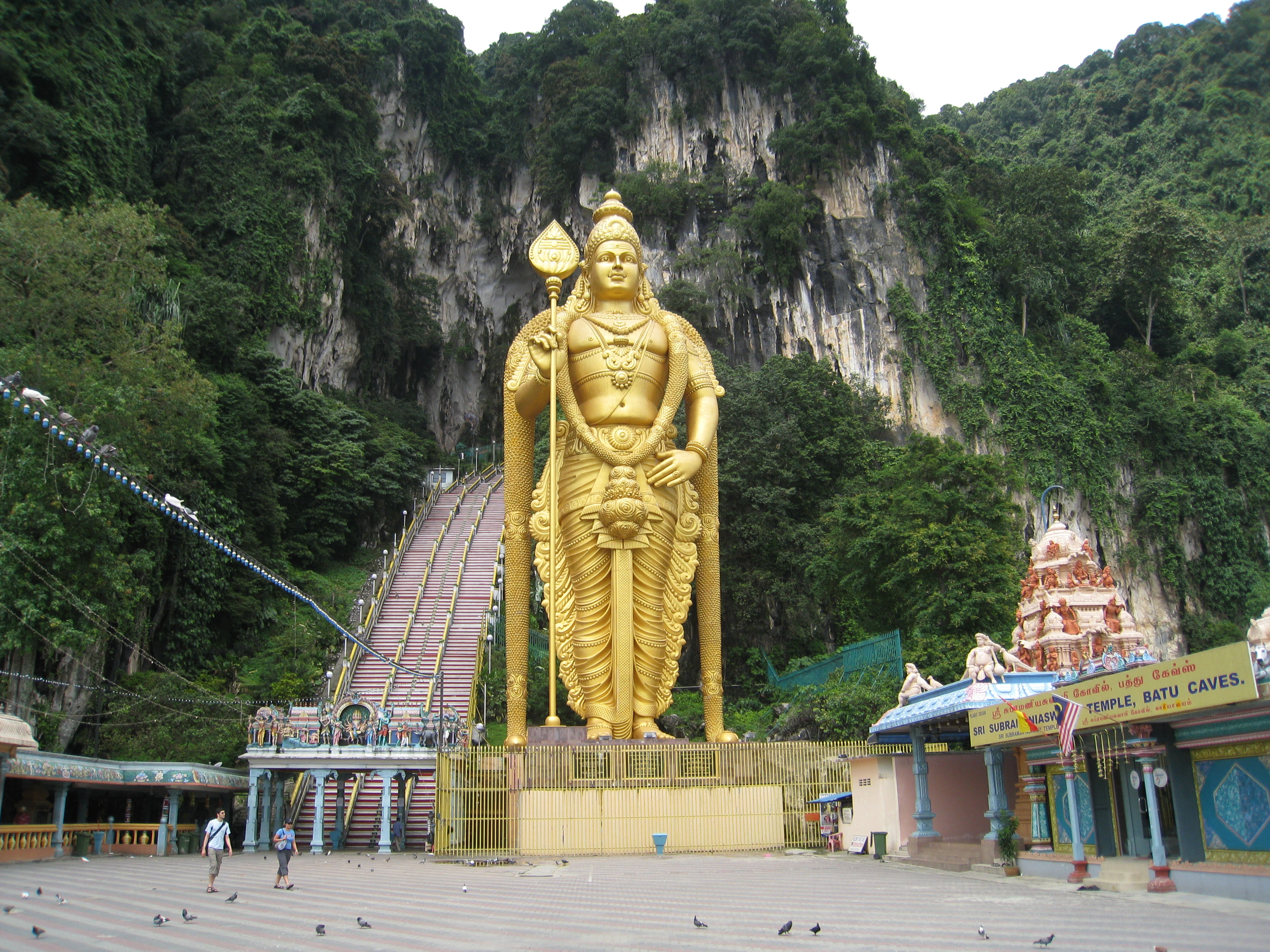
The first Roadblock of the 4th season of The Amazing Race Asia took place at Batu Caves.

- Episode 1: "Amazing Grace" (23 September 2010)
- Prize: A PlayStation 3 and BRAVIA television for each team member (awarded to Ethan & Khairie)

Locations

- Kuala Lumpur, Malaysia (Thean Hou Temple) (Starting Line)
- Gombak (Batu Caves)
- George Town (Pinang Peranakan Mansion)
- George Town (Gelugor – Futsal Court)
- George Town (Swettenham Pier – MS Star Pisces)

Episode summary

- Teams began from Thean Hou Temple and had to drive to Batu Caves, which had their next clue.
- In this season's first Roadblock, one team member had to ascend the Batu Caves' stairs, inhabited by monkeys, while carrying an offering of fruit and counting of steps. Once at the top, they had to give their offering to a Hindu priest and provide the correct number of steps (272) before receiving their next clue.
- After the Roadblock, teams were instructed to drive to "the Pit Stop from Episode 8 of The Amazing Race Season 16 USA version": the Pinang Peranakan Mansion in George Town. Once there, teams had to find "Baldwin", a piano, where their next clue was in the form of piano sheet music of the song "Amazing Grace" that sent them to a futsal court. There, both team member had serve as a goalkeeper against a young player, with teams receiving a two-minute penalty for each goal scored, before receiving their next clue, which directed them to the MS Star Pisces docked at the Swettenham Pier.
- This season's first Detour was a choice between Flags or Rags. In Flags, teams would have searched for five flags hidden around the ship using ship lingo before receiving their next clue. In Rags, one team member had to lower themselves down to clean a window on the ship, while the other had to search for and take a photo of their partner before receiving their next clue. All teams chose Rags.
- After the Detour, teams had to check in at the Pit Stop: the 12th deck of the MS Star Pisces.

Additional note

- This was a non-elimination leg.

=== Leg 2 (Malaysia) ===
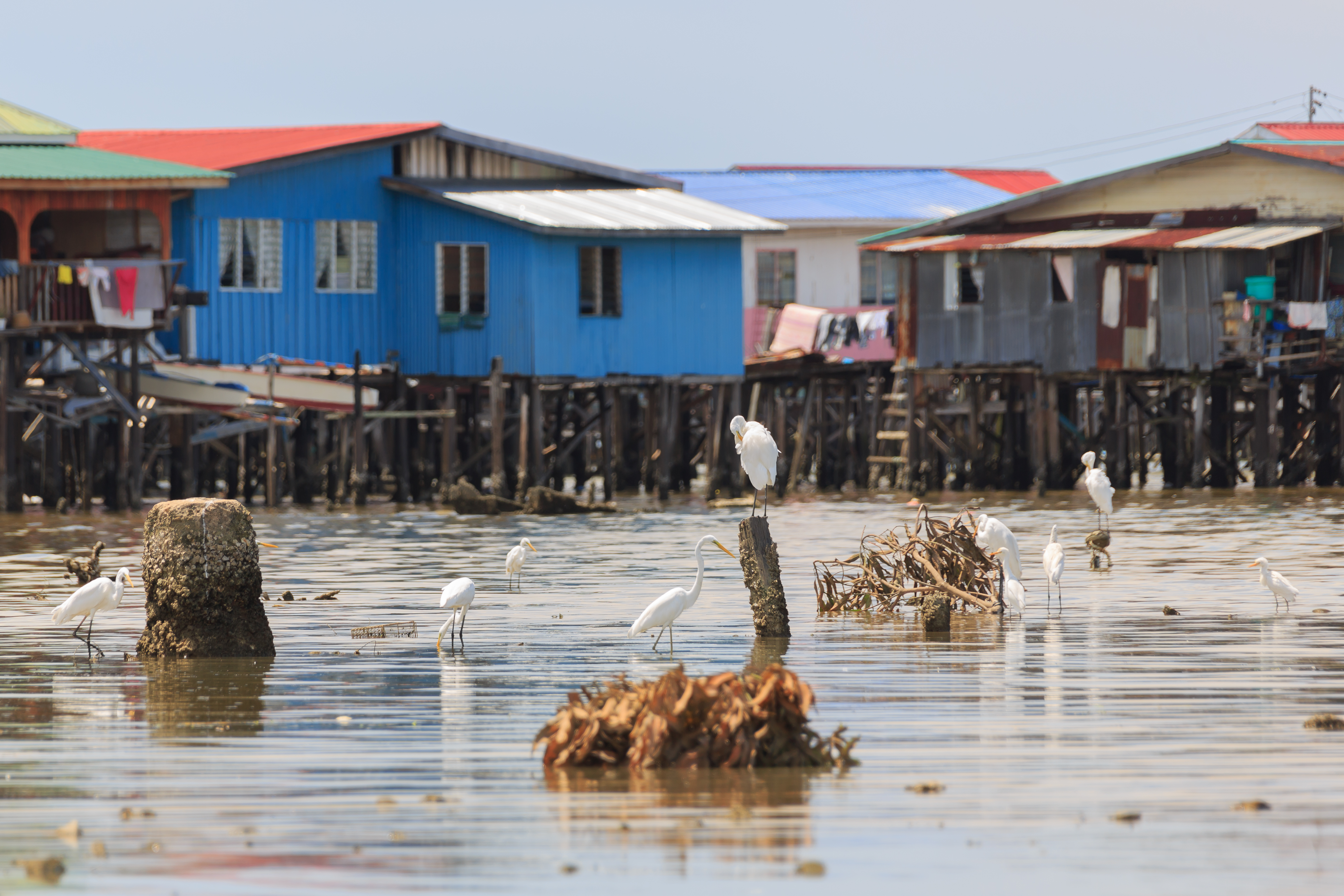
Teams ended this Sabah leg at the floating village of Tanjung Aru.

- Episode 2: "Allan Is Really Good With His Poker Face" (30 September 2010)
- Prize: A VAIO laptop for each team member (awarded to Ivan & Hilda)
- Eliminated: Yani & Nadine

Locations

- George Town (Swettenham Pier – MS Star Pisces)
- George Town (Batu Ferringhi Beach)
- George Town (Penang International Airport) → Kota Kinabalu (Kota Kinabalu International Airport)
- Tuaran (Murut Warrior's Village)
- Kota Kinabalu (Filipino Night Market)
- Kota Kinabalu (Sutera Harbour Marina)
- Tunku Abdul Rahman National Park (Sapi Island)
- Tamparuli (Kiulu River White Water Rafting)
- Kota Kinabalu (Kampung Tanjung Aru)

Episode summary

- At the start of this leg, teams were instructed to travel by taxi to Batu Ferringhi Beach in order to find their next clue, which instructed them to fly to Kota Kinabalu. Once there, teams had to find a marked car with their next clue, which instructed them to drive to the Murut Warrior's Village in Tuaran and join a ceremony involved tribal dancing and touching a snake before receiving their next clue. Teams then had to drive to the Filipino Night Market eat at least a hundred chicken balls in order to receive their next clue. The team that ate the most number of chicken balls won a 20-minute advantage in the next task. Claire & Michelle won this advantage.
- In this leg's Roadblock, one team member had to don diving equipment and guide a ring through an underwater rope maze within a time limit in order to receive their next clue. If racers were unsuccessful, they would incur a four-hour penalty.
- After the Roadblock, teams had to travel by boat to Sapi Island, which had their next clue.
- This leg's Detour was a choice between Rapid Water or Rapid Fire. In Rapid Water, teams had to navigate a bamboo raft down river rapids in order to retrieve their next clue. In Rapid Fire, teams had to hit two targets with tribal slingshots in order to receive their next clue.
- After the Detour, teams had to check in at the Pit Stop: Kampung Tanjung Aru.

=== Leg 3 (Malaysia → Sri Lanka) ===
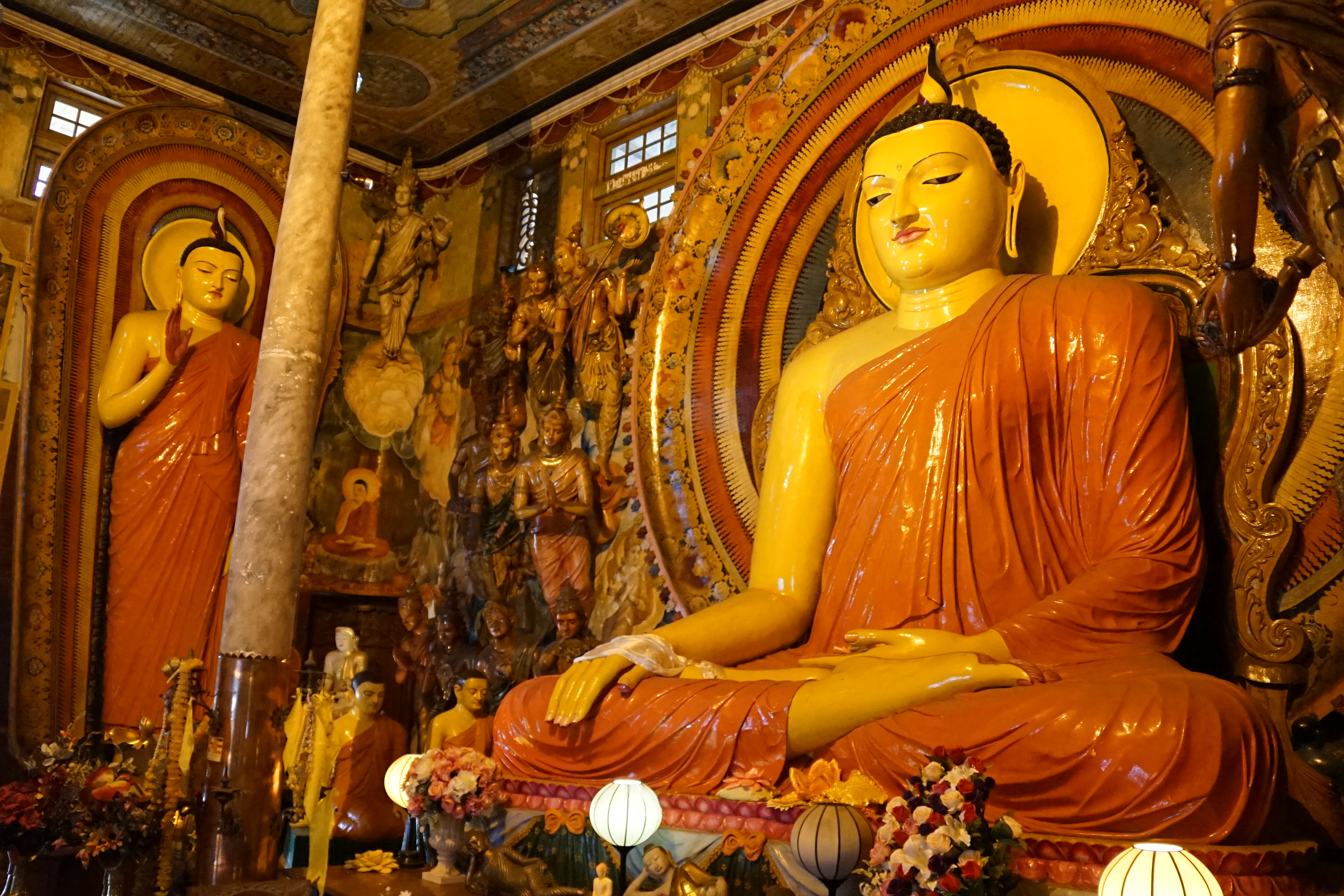
Once in Colombo, teams visited the sitting Buddha inside the Gangaramaya Temple to receive blessings.

- Episode 3: "I Can't Carry My Backpack" (7 October 2010)
- Prize: A vacation package to Colombo, Sri Lanka (awarded to Dimple & Sunaina)

Locations

- Kota Kinabalu (Kampung Tanjung Aru)
- Kota Kinabalu (Kota Kinabalu International Airport) → Kuala Lumpur (Kuala Lumpur International Airport)
- Kuala Lumpur (Axiata Tower – Axiata Telecoms Controls Centre)
- Kuala Lumpur (Kuala Lumpur International Airport) → Colombo, Sri Lanka (Bandaranaike International Airport)
- Colombo (Gangaramaya Temple)
- Colombo (Pettah – St. John's Fish Market)
- Nugegoda (Nugegoda Station Road)
- Nugegoda (Trendy Connections Garment Factory)
- Colombo (Independence Square)

Episode summary

- At the start of this leg, teams were instructed to fly to Kuala Lumpur. Once there, teams had to travel on foot from KL Sentral to the Axiata Tower and find Axiata Telecoms Controls Centre. There, teams must search a picture of a golden Buddha on a television screen and then press the company name of a telecommunications company – Dialog Telekom – located in the same country as the statue on a touchscreen computer in order to receive their next clue. If teams were incorrect, they had to wait two minutes before another attempt. Teams then had to fly to Colombo, Sri Lanka. Once there, teams had to receive a blessing from a Buddhist monk at the Gangaramaya Temple in order to receive their next clue.
- This leg's Detour was a choice between Count or Carry. In Count, teams had to count fish and give the correct number of 1,100 in order to receive their next clue. In Carry, teams had to carry 12 blocks of ice to a market vendor across the fish market in order to receive their next clue.
- After the Detour, both team members had to sell 20 bags of peanuts for Rs.15 a piece on Nugegoda Station Road and exchange their earnings with the vendor for their next clue.
- In this leg's Roadblock, one team member had to use a professional sewing machine to properly sew fabric cuttings into a shirt in order to receive their next clue, which directed them to the Pit Stop: Independence Square.

Additional notes

- Sunaina & Dimple chose to use the Yield on Michelle & Claire.
- This was a non-elimination leg.

=== Leg 4 (Sri Lanka) ===
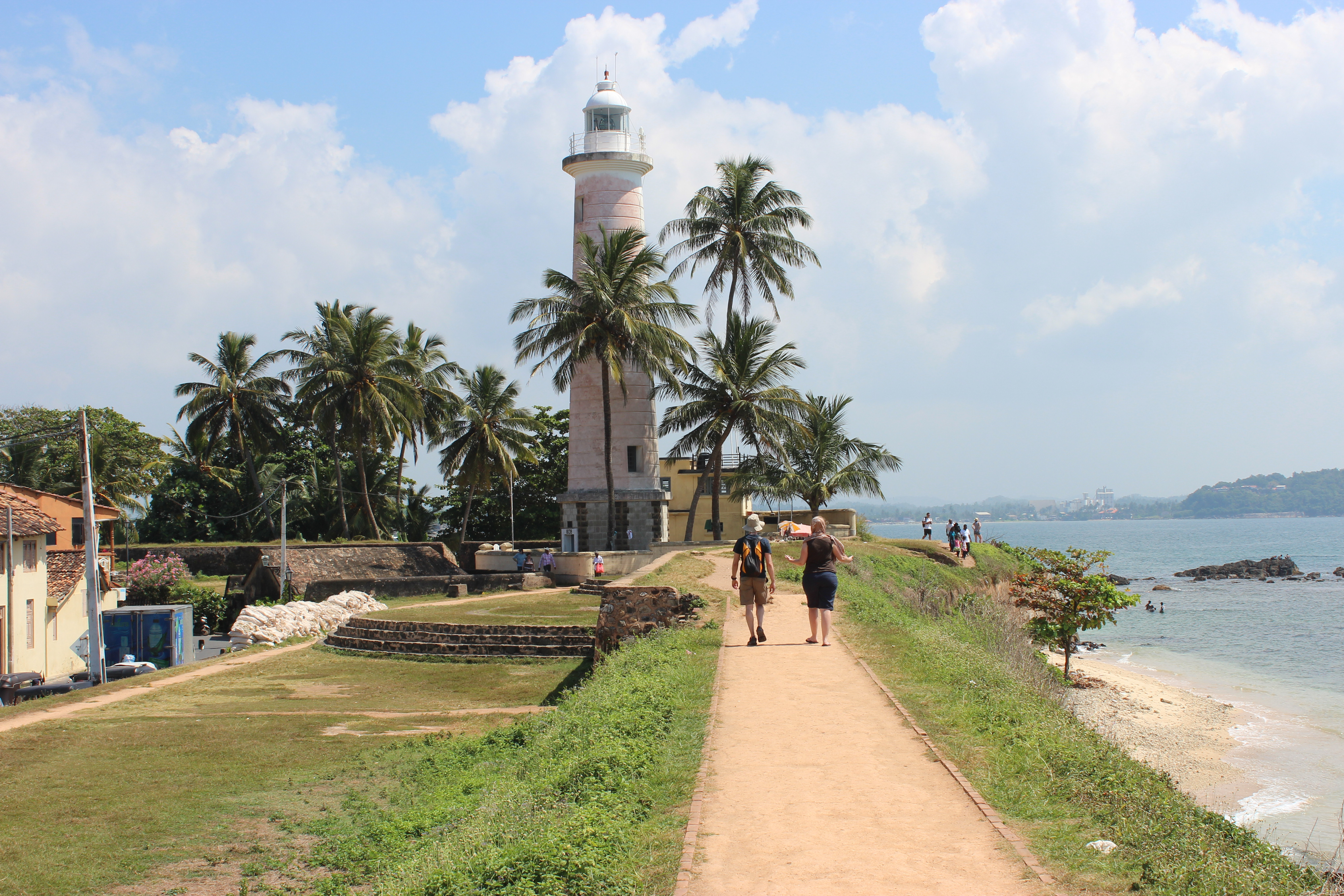
The second leg in Sri Lanka had teams visiting the seaside city of Galle, including its own historic lighthouse; the country's oldest light station.

- Episode 4: "You Have So Many Good Students Here" (14 October 2010)
- Prize: US$2,000 each (awarded to Richard & Richard)
- Eliminated: Alan & Wendy

Locations

- Colombo (Independence Square)
- Colombo (Fort Railway Station) → Galle (Galle Railway Station)
- Galle (Galle Fort)
  - Galle (Galle Bus Station)
- Galle (Galle Lighthouse)
- Galle (Dialog Service Centre)
- Galle (Galle Bus Station) → Ambalangoda (Ambalangoda Train Station – Mask Stall Vendor)
- Kalutara (Coconut Plantation or Holy Cross College)
- Kalutara (Kalutara Kalido Beach)

Episode summary

- At the start of this leg, teams were instructed to travel by train to Galle and then find their next clue at Galle Fort.
- In this season's only Fast Forward, one team had to travel to the Galle Bus Station, where they would discover they had to have their heads shaved by a street barber in order to win the Fast Forward award and a Hilton Duck that they had to bring to the Pit Stop. Richard & Richard won the Fast Forward.
- Teams who did not attempt the Fast Forward had to find their next clue at Galle Lighthouse.
- In this leg's Roadblock, one team member had to determine the year when Sri Lanka changed its name from Ceylon (1972) and use this year as a combination to unlock a wooden chest containing their next clue.
- After the Roadblock, teams had to find a cellular phone with a message "Congratulations. Correct." from a pile of hundreds of ringing phones in order to receive their next clue. Teams then had to travel by bus to a mask stall vendor at the Ambalangoda train station, choose a photograph of a mask and find the performer wearing the same mask at a street festival in order to receive a Hilton duck, which they had to bring to the Pit Stop, and their next clue.
- This leg's Detour was a choice between Coconut Course or Language Course. In Coconut Course, both team members had climb up a laddered coconut tree, traverse a hanging rope between two coconut trees and retrieve a coconut, which they had to give to the chieftain in order to receive their next clue. In Language Course, teams had to learn ten Sinhalese words from a student and then correctly recite them to a teacher in order to receive their next clue.
- After the Detour, teams had to check in at the Pit Stop: Kalutara Kalido Beach.

=== Leg 5 (Sri Lanka → Philippines) ===
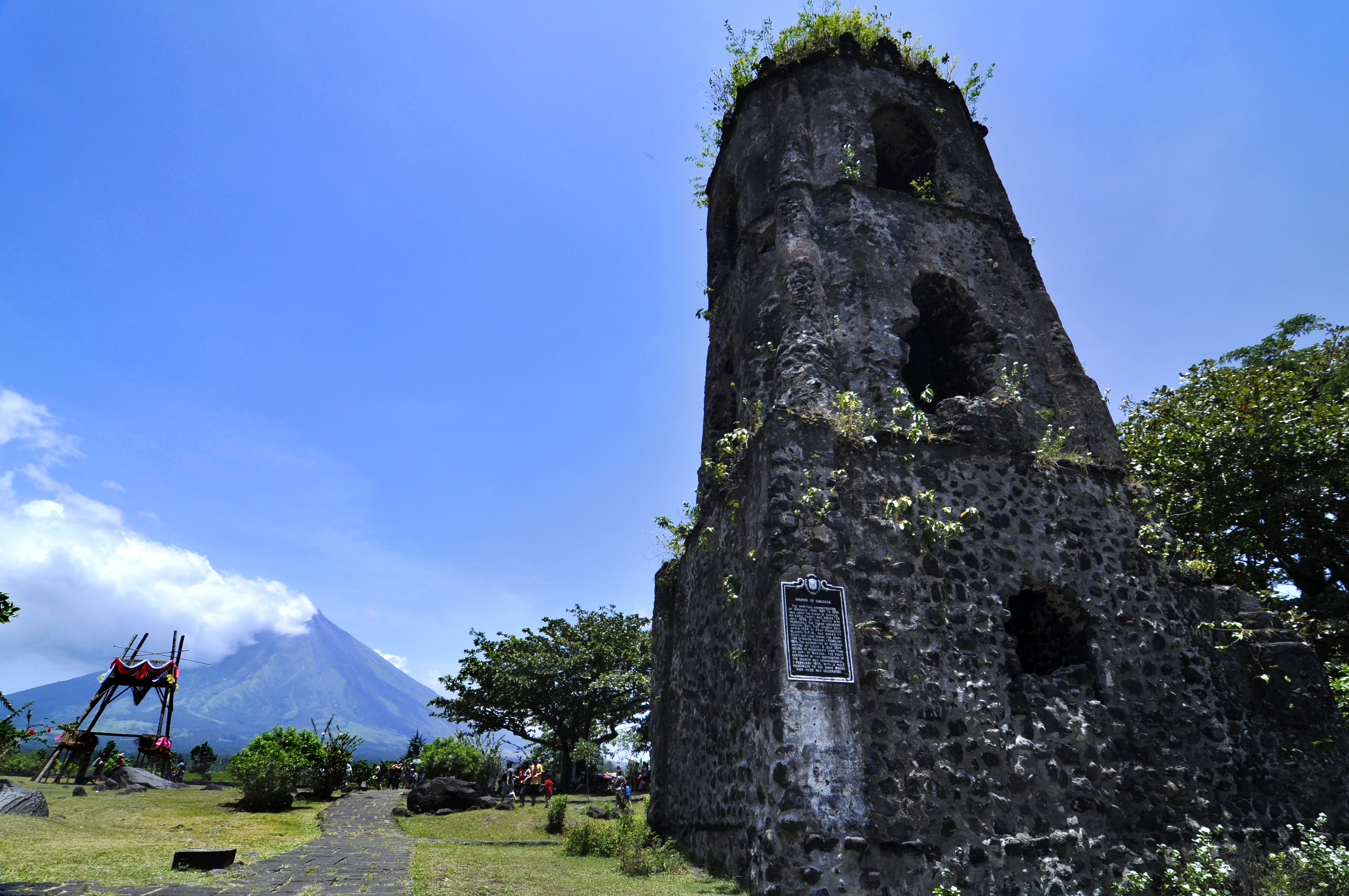
While in the Philippine province of Albay, teams visited the Cagsawa Ruins, in the shadow of Mayon Volcano near Legazpi.

- Episode 5: "I Think They're Spoiled And Not Hardworking" (21 October 2010)
- Prize: A trip for two to the Philippines, US$3,500, and a helicopter ride to the airport during the next leg (awarded to Ethan & Khairie)
- Eliminated: Sahil & Manas

Locations

- Kalutara (Kalutara Kalido Beach)
- Colombo (Bandaranaike International Airport) → Manila, Philippines (Ninoy Aquino International Airport)
- Manila (Ninoy Aquino International Airport) or Pasay (Philtranco Pasay Terminal) → Legazpi (Legazpi Airport)
- Legazpi (Ligñon Hill)
- Daraga (Barangay Budiao)
- Daraga (Cagsawa Ruins)
- Bacacay (Misibis Bay Resort and Casino – Misibis Bay Eco Park)
- Bacacay (Misibis Bay Resort and Casino – Bahi Beach)
- Bacacay (Misibis Bay Resort and Casino – Amphitheater)

Episode summary

- At the start of this leg, teams were instructed to fly to Manila, Philippines and then travel by plane or bus to Legazpi. Once there, teams had to find a jeepney outside the airport with their next clue. After travelling by jeepney to Ligñon Hill, teams were instructed to travel to Barangay Budiao in Daraga and then drive an ATV to their next clue at the Cagsawa Ruins. There, teams had to play a traditional pukpok palayok game. One team member was blindfolded and had to smash a clay pot containing their next clue, while their partner used a tambourine to guide them to the pot.
- This leg's Detour was a choice between Jig or Pig. In Jig, teams had to don costumes and perform a traditional Ibalong dance to the satisfaction of two judges in order to receive their next clue. In Pig, teams had to compete in a game of catch the oily pig with each team member having to catch two pigs in order to receive their next clue.
- After the Detour, teams encountered an Intersection, where teams were required to work together in pairs to complete tasks until further notice. The teams were paired up thusly: Ethan & Khairie and Claire & Michelle, Richard & Richard and Dimple & Sunaina, Jess & Lani and Ivan & Hilda, and Hussein & Natasha and Sahil & Manas. After pairing up, teams had to remove the trash from a marked beach at Misibis Bay Eco Park in order to receive the next clue. After this task, teams were no longer joined.
- In this leg's Roadblock, one team member had to kayak along a flagged fish farm and search among hundreds of Amazing Race envelopes for one of ten marked "Correct!", which contained their next clue.
- After the Roadblock, teams had to travel by jet ski to Bahi Beach and then by jeep to the Pit Stop.

Additional notes

- Six teams took a bus from Manila to Legazpi, while the other two teams (Natasha & Hussein and Manas & Sahil) took a flight from Manila to Legazpi instead.
- Filipino media personality Tessa Prieto-Valdes was the Pit Stop greeter on this leg.

=== Leg 6 (Philippines → New Zealand) ===
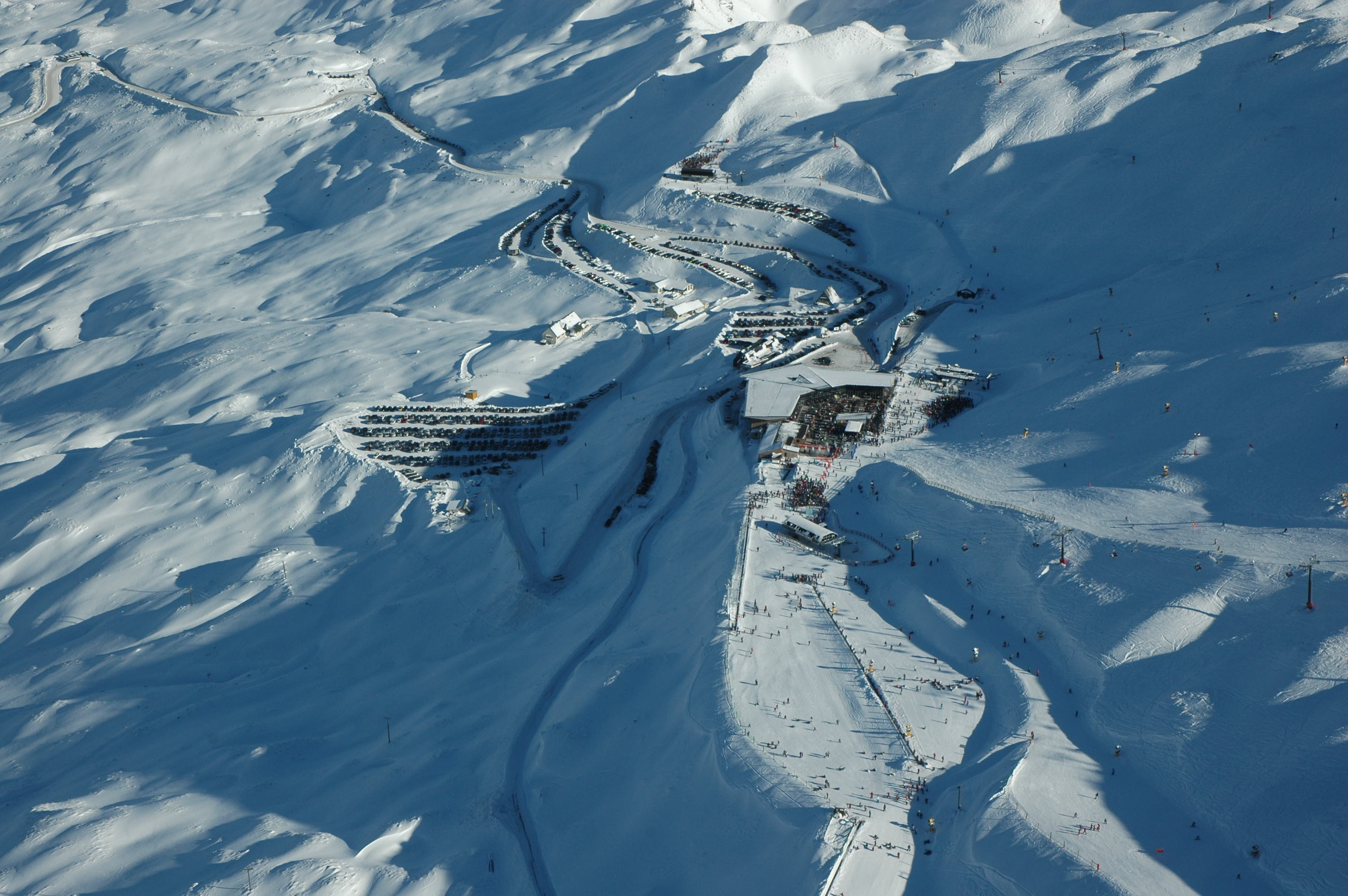
Teams ended this leg around the South Island of New Zealand at the snowy Coronet Peak, the country's first commercial skifield, near Queenstown.

- Episode 6: "There's A Bigger Race And It's Called Life" (28 October 2010)
- Prize: A vacation package and a dinner for two at the Marina Bay Sands in Singapore (awarded to Richard & Richard)
- Eliminated: Ivan & Hilda

Locations

- Bacacay (Misibis Bay Resort and Casino – Bahi Beach)
  - Bacacay (Misibis Bay Resort and Casino – Helipad) → Legazpi (Legazpi Airport)
- Legazpi (Legazpi Airport) → Invercargill, New Zealand (Invercargill Airport)
- Te Anau (Lake Te Anau)
- Kingston (Pillan's Paddock)
- Gibbston (Nevis Highwire Platform)
- Queenstown (Queenstown Events Centre)
- Queenstown (Coronet Peak)

Episode summary

- At the start of this leg, teams were instructed to fly to Invercargill, New Zealand. Once there, teams had to find a camper with a clue instructing them to find a fisherman at Lake Te Anau with their next clue. Teams then had to drive to Pillan's Paddock in Kingston, where they had to saw five slabs from a log together and one slab each individually in order to receive their next clue.
- This leg's Detour was a choice between Plunge or Swing. In Plunge, which was a Switchback of a Roadblock from season 1, both team member had to bungee jump from a height of 134 metres (440 ft) above the Nevis River in order to receive their next clue. In Swing, teams had to swing from a platform 300 metres (980 ft) above the Nevis Canyon in order to receive their next clue.
- After the Detour, teams had to score a try then kick a conversion against a team of three rugby players, some of whom were former national team players, at the Queenstown Events Centre in order to receive their next clue. Teams had to score in 10 attempts or serve a 10-minute penalty.
- In this leg's Roadblock, teams drove to Coronet Peak, where one team member had to search for their next clue buried in the snow using an avalanche rescue transceiver.
- After the Roadblock, they had to ride a 4x4 truck to the Pit Stop: the top of Coronet Peak.

Additional notes

- For winning the previous leg, Ethan & Khairie travelled by helicopter to Legazpi Airport.
- Claire & Michelle chose to use the U-Turn on Dimple & Sunaina.

=== Leg 7 (New Zealand → Australia) ===
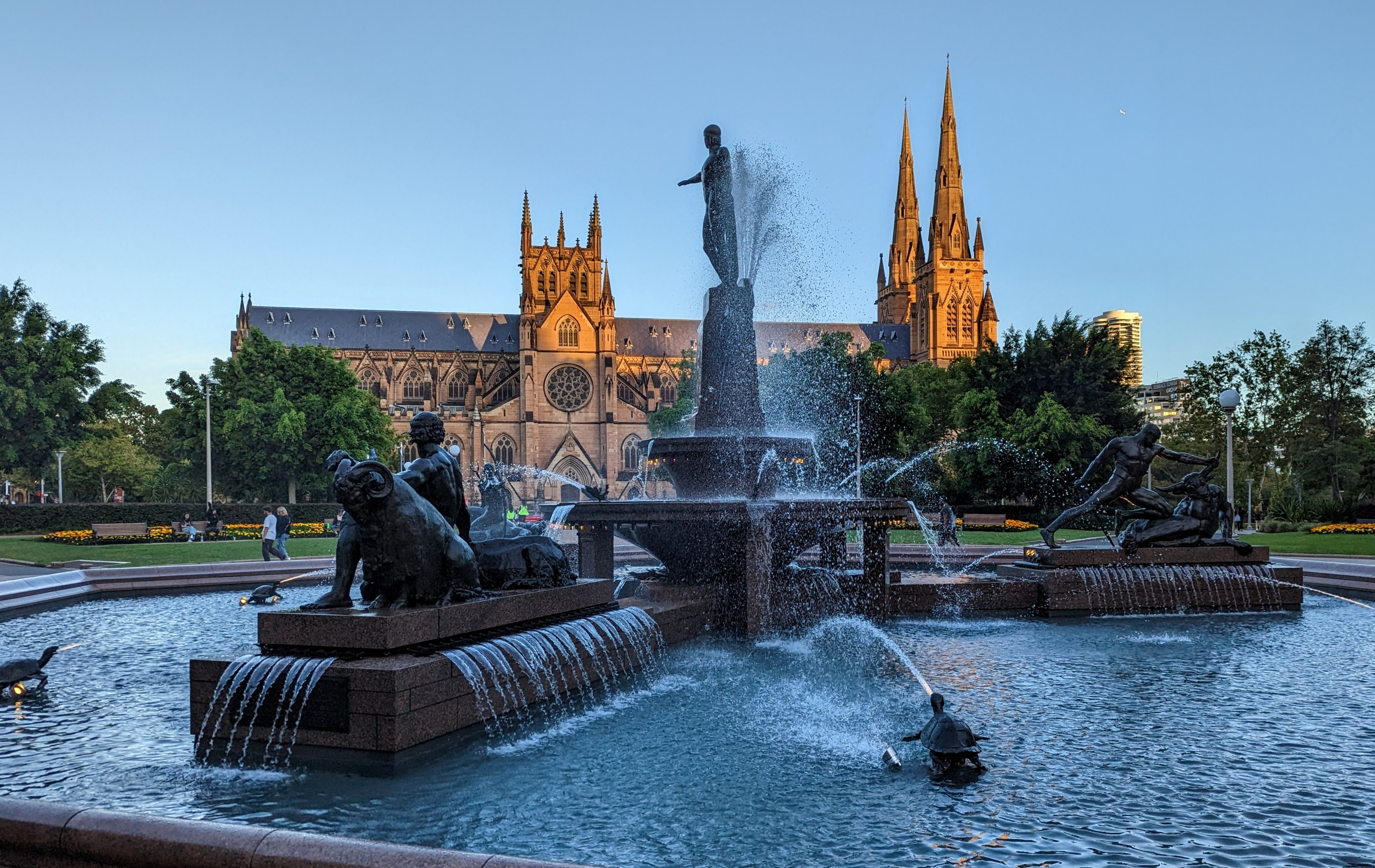
Teams finished the leg in Sydney at Hyde Park's Archibald Fountain, overlooking the St Mary's Cathedral, where they discovered that they would continue racing in Australia.

- Episode 7: "I'm The Sheep Whisperer" (4 November 2010)

Locations

- Queenstown (Coronet Peak)
- Queenstown (Coronet Peak – Kaiserlift)
- Central Otago (Central Otago Wine Region)
- Arrowtown (Arrowtown Post Office)
- Queenstown (Queenstown Airport) → Sydney, Australia (Sydney Airport) (Note: Several teams took a train from International Airport Railway Station to Circular Quay Railway Station, though it was not required by the clue.)
- Sydney (Circular Quay)
- Sydney (Hilton Hotel)
- Sydney (Sydney Olympic Park Aquatic Centre – Circus Art School)
- Sydney (Hyde Park – Archibald Fountain)

Episode summary

- At the start of this leg, teams had to travel on foot to Coronet Peak's Kaiserlift where they were instructed to complete a slalom skiing course in order to receive their next clue.
- This leg's Detour was a choice between Pen or Pinot. In Pen, teams had to separate three marked sheep from a flock and into a pen to receive their next clue. In Pinot, teams had to carry and fill a wine barrel with wine to receive their next clue.
- After the Detour, teams had to drive to the Arrowtown Post Office and mail the videos they made for their loved ones during the Pit Stop in order to receive their next clue, which instructed them to fly to Sydney, Australia. Once there, teams had to search Circular Quay for a man with an umbrella on his right hand and ask him "Any clue about the weather, mate?" in order to receive their next clue. Teams then had to travel to the Hilton Hotel and make a bed to the hotel's standard within three minutes to receive their next clue. After four failed attempts, teams had to serve a 10-minute penalty. The fastest team would win an upgrade at any Hilton hotel. Ethan & Khairie won this prize.
- In this leg's Roadblock, one team member had to perform a flying trapeze maneuver known as a "catch" at Circus Art School to receive their next clue, which directed them to the Pit Stop: Archibald Fountain at Hyde Park.

Additional note

- At the Pit Stop in the Archibald Fountain at Hyde Park along the vicinity of St Mary's Cathedral where "Allan Wu awaits", only to figure out that it was a Virtual Pit Stop. On this note, there was no elimination at the end of this leg, and all teams were instead instructed to continue racing.

=== Leg 8 (Australia) ===
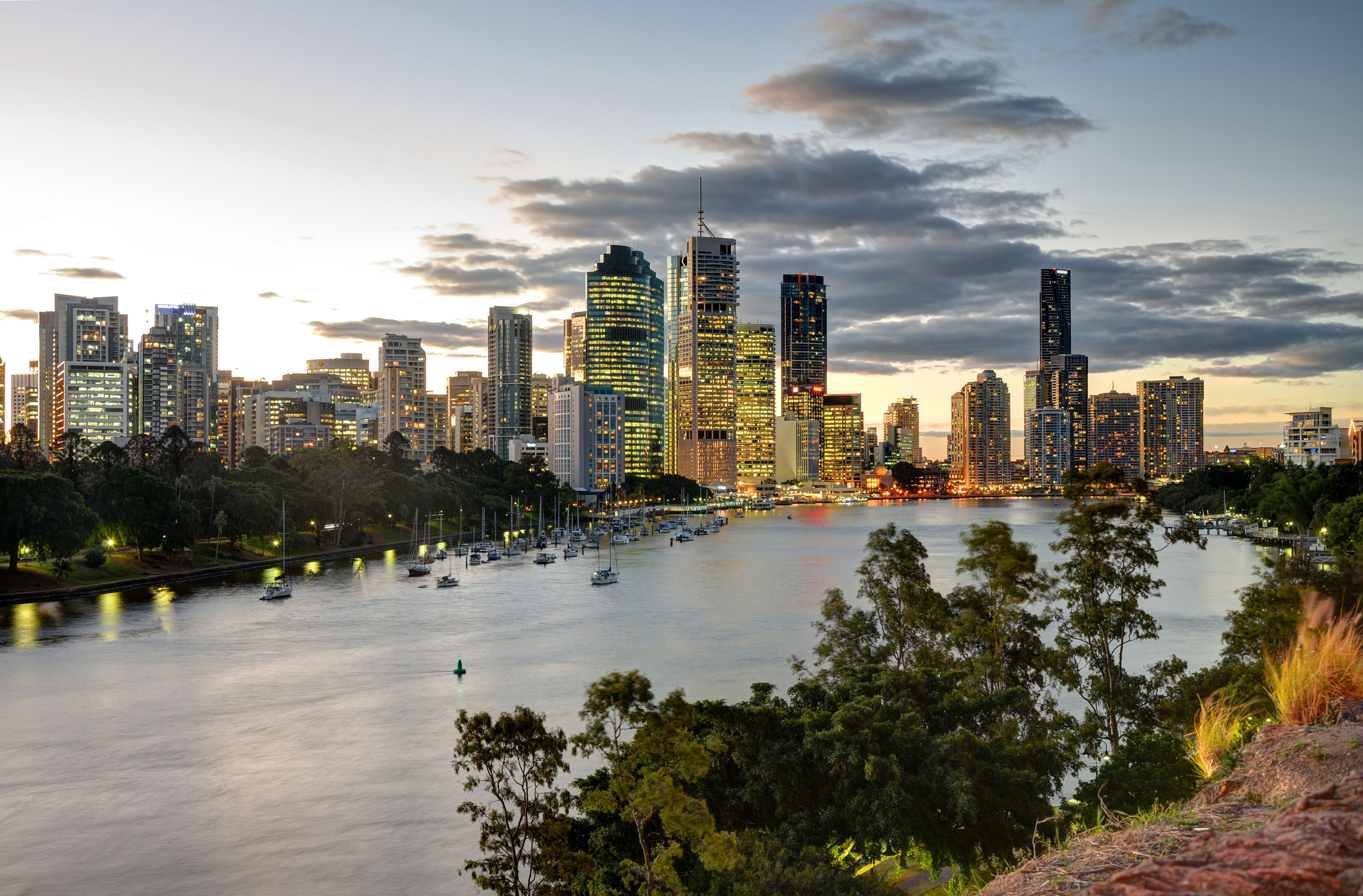
The leg in Queensland ended at Kangaroo Point, overlooking the skyline of Downtown Brisbane.

- Episode 8: "I Was Not Allowed To Shoot The Gun Anymore" (11 November 2010)
- Prize: A four-day ski vacation at Niseko, Japan (awarded to Jess & Lani)
- Eliminated: Dimple & Sunaina

Locations

- Sydney (Sydney Airport) → Brisbane (Brisbane Airport)
- Gold Coast (Southport Indoor Pistol Club)
- Gold Coast (Dreamworld)
- Gold Coast (WRX Experience Rally Circuit)
- Gold Coast (Kurrawa Beach)
- Gold Coast (Coombabah Farm)
- Brisbane (Kangaroo Point Park)

Episode summary

- At the start of this leg, teams were instructed to fly to Brisbane. Once there, teams had to find a Wicked camper van with their next clue, which directed them to drive to the Southport Indoor Pistol Club in Gold Coast. There, both team members had to shoot a target using a .44 Magnum revolver in order to receive their next clue. Teams then had to drive to Dreamworld and ride The Giant Drop until they were able to photograph a koala mascot waving an Amazing Race flag using a digital camera in order to receive their next clue.
- In this leg's Roadblock, one team member had to drive a Subaru Impreza WRX one lap around a rally circuit within 102 seconds in order to receive their next clue.
- After the Roadblock, teams had to drive to Kurrawa Beach and dig a clue buried in a marked area of beach.
- This leg's Detour was a choice between Bush Chucker or Bush Hunter. Before performing either Detour option, team members had to paint each other's faces much like Aboriginal Australians. In Bush Chucker, teams had to throw a boomerang and have it land within a marked circular area. In Bush Hunter, teams had to throw a hunting spear into a hay bale. After completing either Detour task, one team member had to eat a live witchetty grub before receiving their next clue.
- After the Detour, teams had to drive back to Brisbane and check in at the Pit Stop: Kangaroo Point Park.

=== Leg 9 (Australia → Indonesia) ===
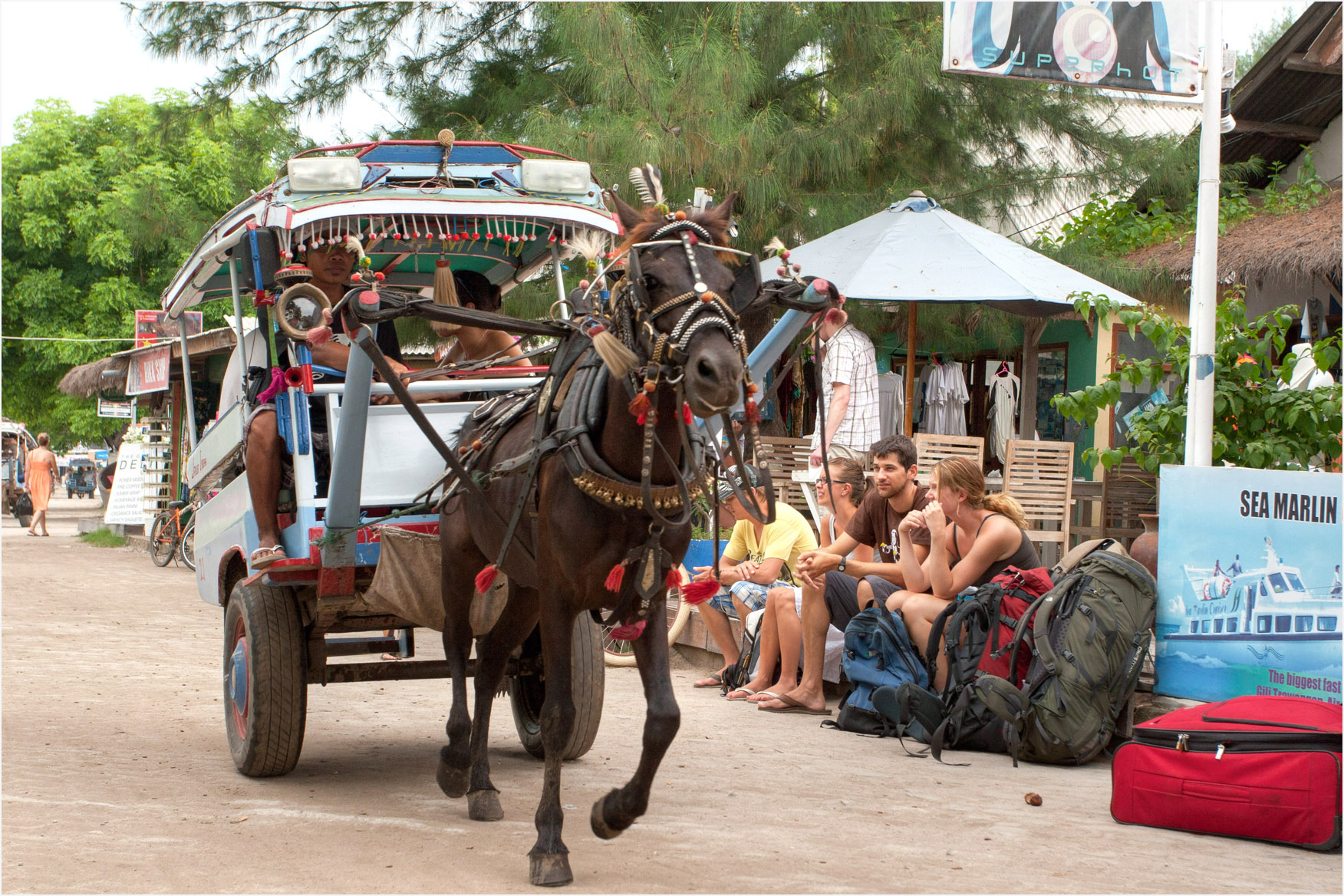
While in Indonesia's Gili Islands, teams had to ride on cidomos as their mode of transportation during the leg.

- Episode 9: "I Can't Believe We Let Them Step In Front Of Us" (18 November 2010)
- Prize: A year's supply of gasoline (awarded to Jess & Lani)
- Eliminated: Ethan & Khairie

Locations

- Brisbane (Kangaroo Point Park)
- Brisbane (Brisbane Airport) → Denpasar, Indonesia (Ngurah Rai International Airport)
- Denpasar (Ocean Star Boat Express) → Mataram (Tanjung Karang Fishing Village (in Indonesian))
- Mataram (Pura Meru (in Dutch))
- Lingsar (Pura Lingsar)
- Mataram (Mandalika Market or Kuburan Cina)
- Malaka (Malimbu Beach)
- Gili Trawangan (Blue Marlin Dive, Halik Reef & Coral Beach)
- Gili Trawangan (Sunset Point)

Episode summary

- At the start of this leg, teams were instructed to fly to Denpasar, Indonesia on the island of Bali. Once there, teams had to sign up for a departure time for one of two boats to Lombok at the Ocean Star Boat Express, with the first boat leaving at 7:00 a.m. containing two teams, and the second boat leaving at 7:30 a.m. containing three teams. After landing at the Tanjung Karang Fishing Village, teams had to search for their next clue, which was hidden in a boat moored along the beach. Teams then had to travel to Pura Lingsar and run through a perang topat, a rice war ritual where teams were showered with rice powder by locals, to their next clue.
- This leg's Detour was a choice between Above or Beyond. In Above, teams travelled to Mandalika Market and had to carry a basket of vegetables above their heads, without their hands touching the basket, a distance of 50 metres (160 ft) in order to receive their next clue. In Beyond, teams would have had to search Kuburan Cina for the grave of Fam Sam Moy, once they would have found it, they would grab their next clue. Ethan & Khairie initially attempted Above, before attempted Beyond until switching back to Above.
- After the Detour, teams had to travel to Malimbu Beach in order to find their next clue.
- In this leg's Roadblock, teams had to travel by outrigger boat to Blue Marlin Dive on Gili Trawangan, where one team member had to learn to scuba dive before diving into Halik Reef to retrieve a briefcase. Then, both team members had to return to Gili Trawangan, ride a local horse carriage called a cidomo to Coral Beach, count the money in the briefcase (Rp 3,804,000) and enter the correct amount into a VAIO laptop in order to receive their next clue. If teams did not enter the correct combination within three attempts, they had to wait for 10 minutes before they could enter another combination.
- After the Roadblock, teams had to travel by cidomo to the Pit Stop: Sunset Point.

=== Leg 10 (Indonesia → South Korea) ===
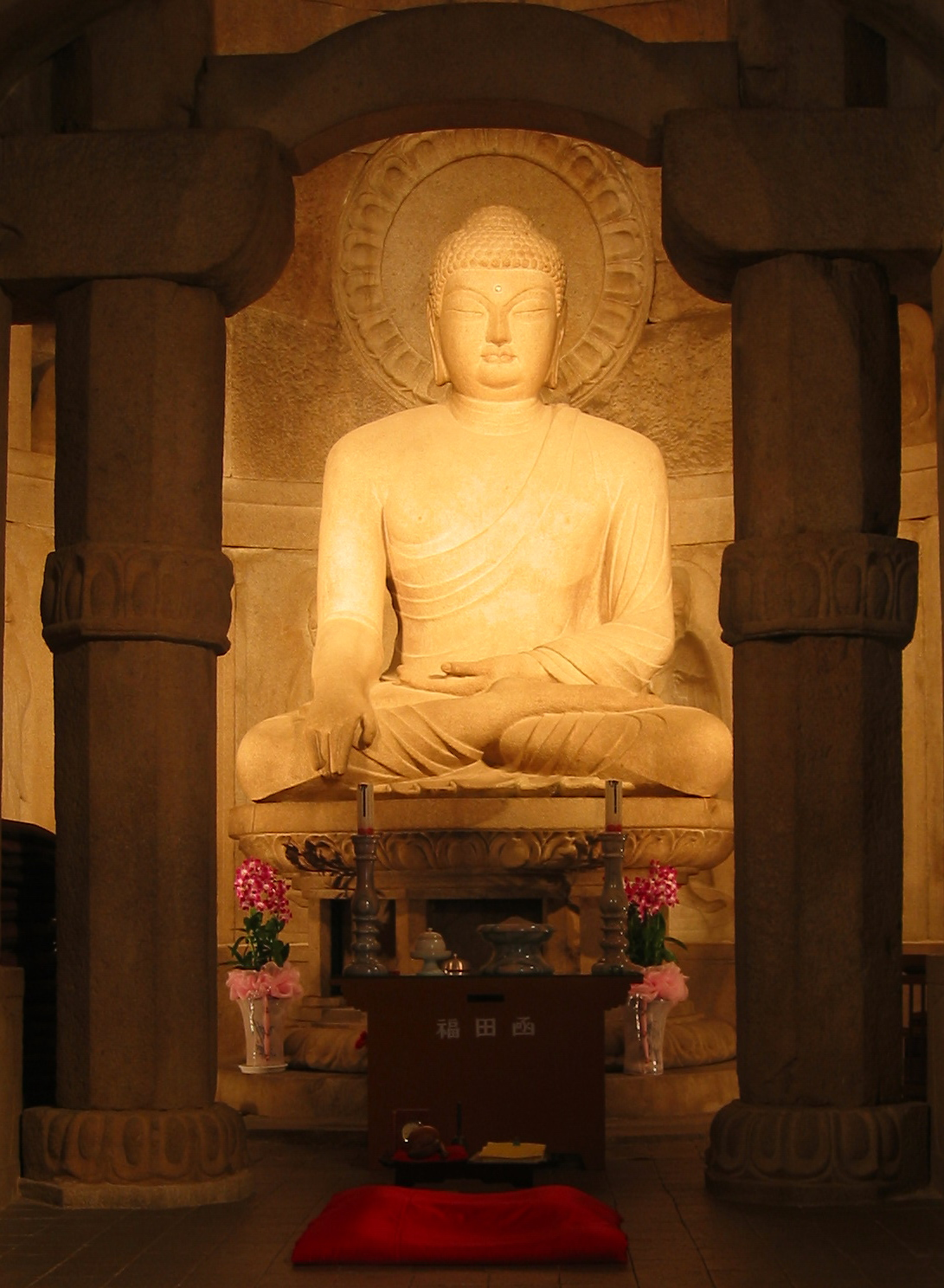
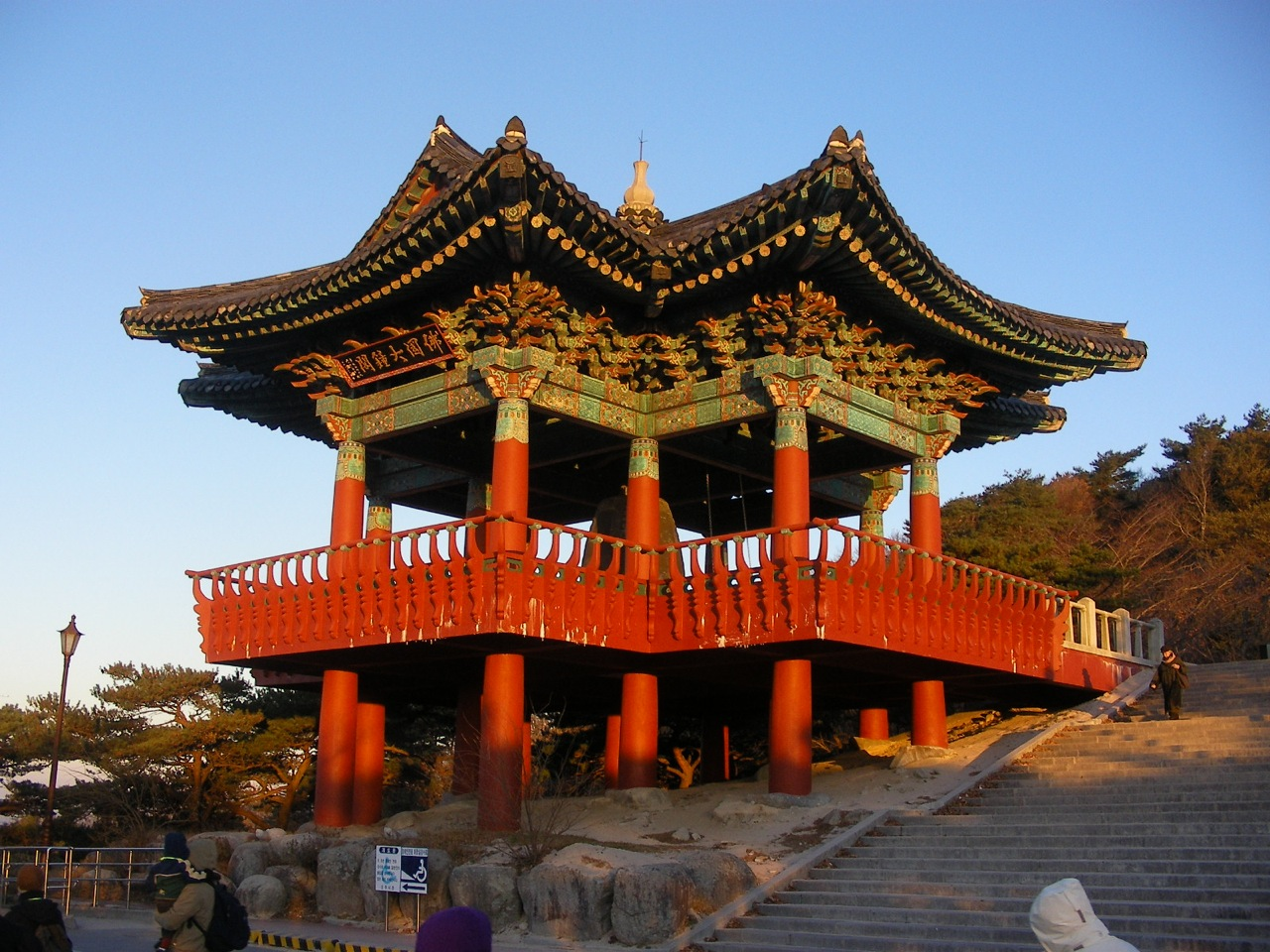
Teams visited the Seokguram Grotto (left), a UNESCO World Heritage Site and one of South Korea's "National Treasures", to ring the temple's Reunification bell. (right)
- Episode 10: "We Don't Hate Anyone" (25 November 2010)
- Prize: A seven-night stay at a water villa in the Maldives (awarded to Hussein & Natasha)
- Eliminated: Jess & Lani

Locations

- Mataram (Selaparang Airport) → Pohang, South Korea (Pohang Airport)
- Pohang (Homigot Sunrise Plaza – Hands of Harmony)
- Gyeongju (Girimsa Temple)
- Gyeongju (Seokguram Grotto)
- Gyeongju (Hwarang Educational Institute)
- Gyeongju (Daereungwon Tomb Complex (in Korean))
- Gyeongju (Gyeongju National Park – Anapji Pond)

Episode summary

- At the start of this leg, teams were instructed to fly to Pohang, South Korea. Once there, teams had to figure out that their next clue was at the Hands of Harmony sculpture at Homigot Sunrise Plaza. From there, teams had to drive to Girimsa Temple in Gyeongju, where one team member had to answer five questions, and their partner had to match the answers in order to receive their next clue.

Questions	Answers			
Questions	Claire & Michelle	Hussein & Natasha	Jess & Lani	Richard & Richard
Which team makes you envy their relationship?	Hussein & Natasha	Ivan & Hilda	Richard & Richard	Richard & Richard
Which team do you dislike the most?	Jess & Lani	Jess & Lani	Ethan & Khairie	Sahil & Manas
If the race was a foursome, which team would you pair up with?	Ethan & Khairie	Richard & Richard	Richard & Richard	Dimple & Sunaina
Which team would be the first to stab you in the back?	Jess & Lani	Claire & Michelle	Ethan & Khairie	Ethan & Khairie
Which team doesn't deserve to be in the final?	Jess & Lani	Jess & Lani	Hussein & Natasha	Jess & Lani

- Teams then had to drive to the Seokguram Grotto and ring the Reunification bell three times in order to receive their next clue.
- This leg's Detour was a choice between Bow N' Arrow or Rock N' Roll. In Bow N' Arrow, they had to choose another team's photograph as a target and hit it three times with a traditional bow and arrow in order receive their next clue. In Rock N' Roll, teams had to build a ceremonial pagoda to a certain height using rocks in order to receive their next clue.
- In this leg's Roadblock, teams had to drive to the Daereungwon Tomb Complex, where one team member had to walk through three rows of gates, only one of which in each row was correct, to receive their next clue. If racers chose an incorrect gate, they were blocked by warriors. Each racer had three attempts to correctly decode the warrior's code or else they had to go back to the starting point and start again.
- After the Roadblock, teams had to check in at the Pit Stop: the Anapji Pond in Gyeongju National Park.

=== Leg 11 (South Korea → Singapore) ===
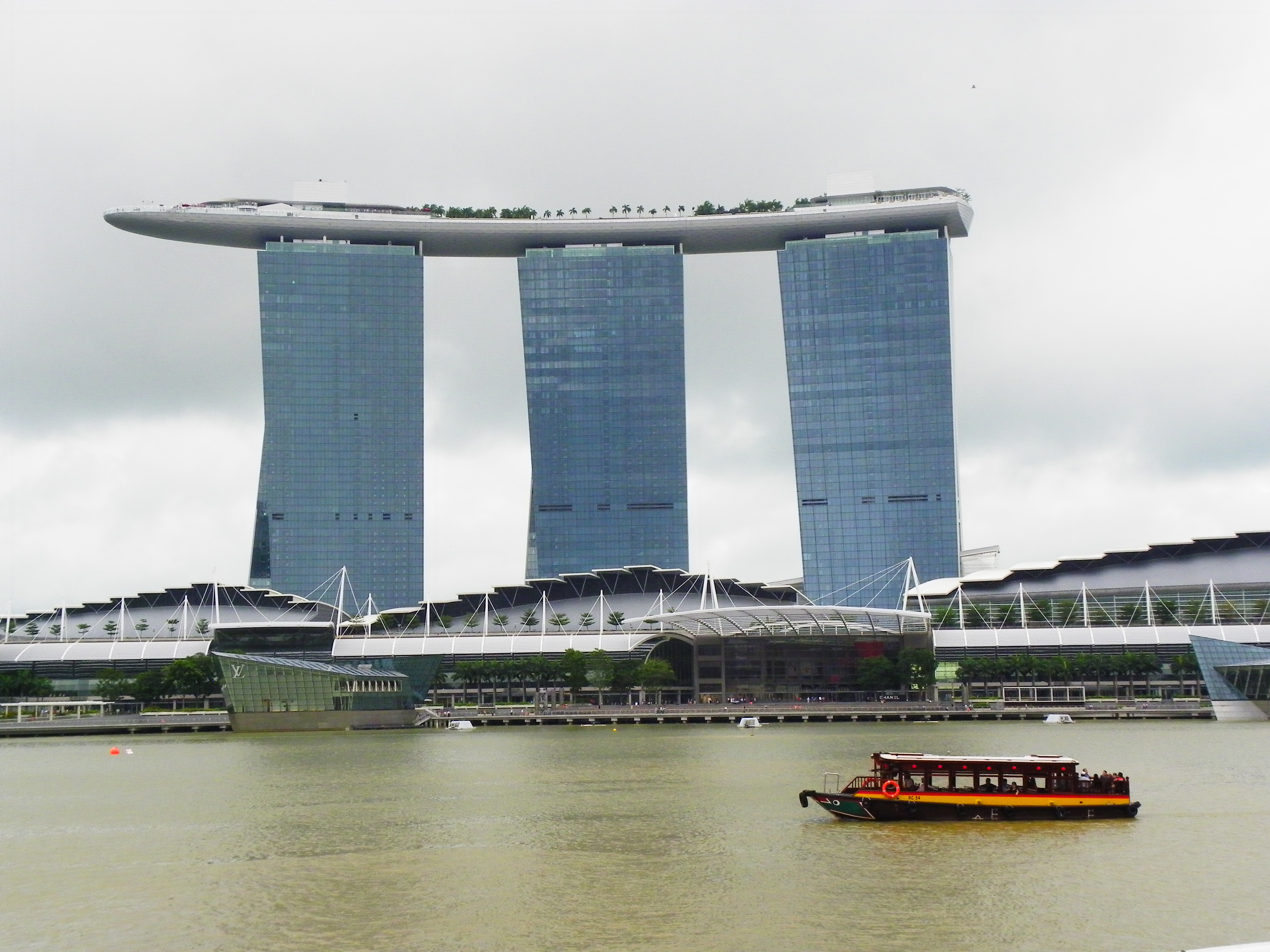
Marina Bay Sands in Downtown Singapore was the site of the final Roadblock and Finish Line.

- Episode 11: "I'm Still In Shock" (9 December 2010)
- Prize: US$100,000
- Winners: Richard & Richard
- Runners-up: Claire & Michelle
- Third place: Hussein & Natasha

Locations

- Gyeongju (Gyeongju National Park – Anapji Pond)
- Pohang (Pohang Airport) → Singapore (Changi Airport)
- Singapore (Cavenagh Bridge)
- Singapore (East Coast Seafood Centre – Red House Seafood Restaurant)
- Singapore (Caltex Service Station)
- Singapore (Sentosa – Wave House or G-Max Reverse Bungy)
- Singapore (St James Power Station)
- Singapore (Marina Bay Sands – Tower 1 & 2)
- Singapore (Marina Bay Sands – Sky Park Swimming Pool)
- Singapore (Marina Bay Sands – Sky Park Observation Deck)

Episode summary

- At the start of this leg, teams were instructed to fly to Singapore. Once there, teams had to find a troupe of lion dancers at Cavenagh Bridge with their next clue, which directed them to the Red House Seafood Restaurant at the East Coast Seafood Centre. There, teams had to extract one kilogram (2.2 lb) of crab meat from a serving of chilli crab in order to receive their next clue. Teams then had to search among four service stations for a vintage car with their next clue.
- This season's final Detour was a choice between Stay Up or Add Up. In Stay Up, teams had to travel to Wave House and ride an artificially-generated wave for an accumulated time of two minutes in order to receive their next clue. In Add Up, teams had to travel to the G-Max Reverse Bungy, where they had to add up three numbers called out by the host and get the correct sum in order to receive their next clue.
- After the Detour, teams had to travel to the St James Power Station and perform an escape illusion where one team member had to unlock themselves from handcuffs within two minutes in order to receive their next clue from illusionists J C Sum and Magic Babe Ning.
- In this season's final Roadblock, one team member had to walk a tightrope from Tower 1 to Tower 2 of the Marina Bay Sands, retrieve their clue and return to Tower 1.
- After the Roadblock, teams had to ride an elevator to the Sky Park swimming pool and then correctly answer seven multiple-choice questions about previous legs using coloured swim rings in order to receive their final clue, which directed them to the Finish Line: the Sky Park observation deck.

Question	Answer	
The name of the church ruins where you hit the clay pots is called:	A	Cagsawa
What was the name of the rice war in Lombok?	A	Perang Topat
Who was the fifth team to be eliminated?	B	Dimple & Sunaina
Which Pit Stop featured a traditional drum band:	B	Galle
The number of peanuts each team had to sell in Colombo, Sri Lanka was:	C	40
The Pit Stop in Queensland was called:	C	Kangaroo Point
The place where you skied in Queenstown was called:	B	Coronet Peak
