= Golgulsa =

Buddhist temple in Gyeongju, South Korea

- 골굴사
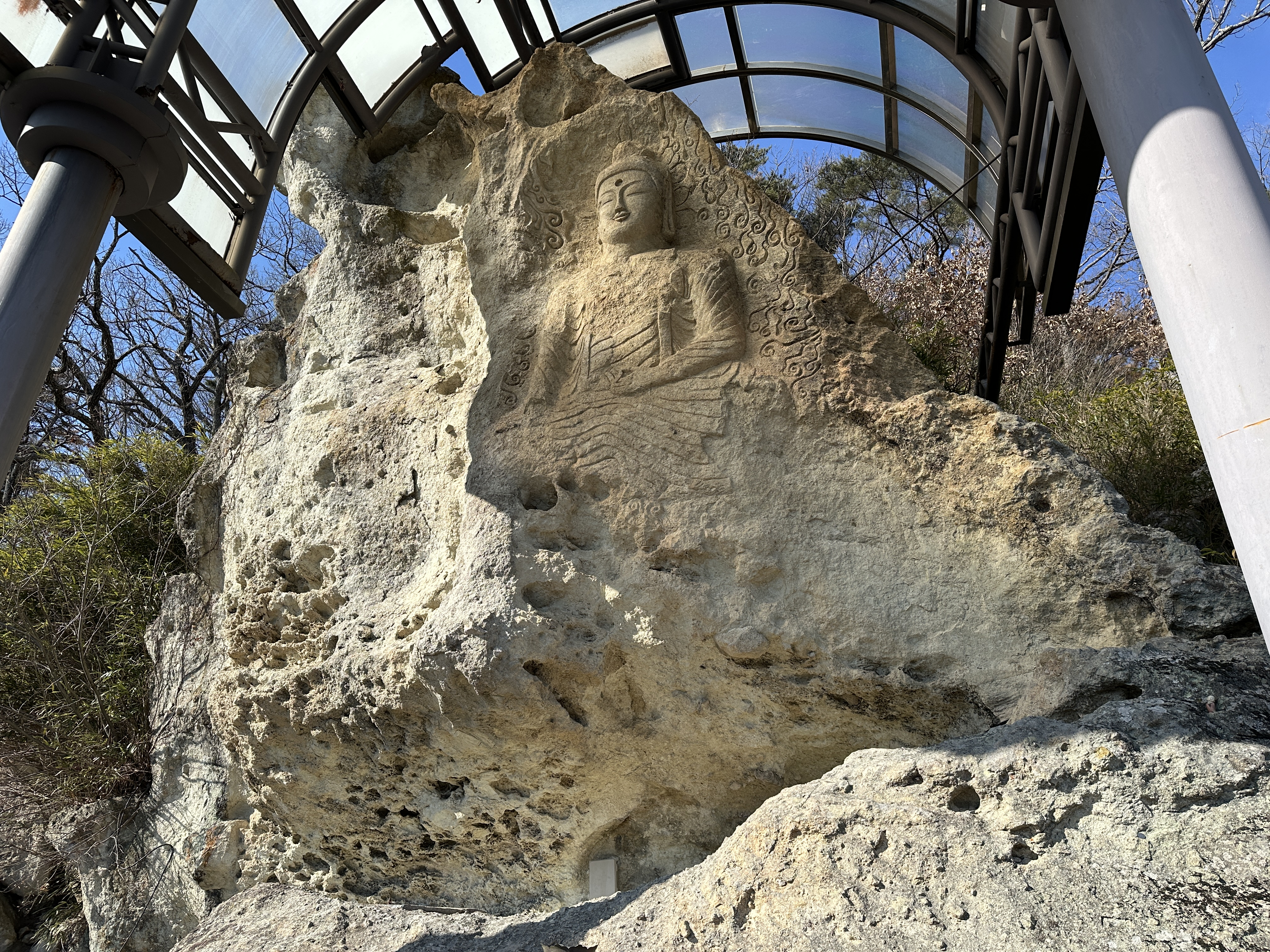
- Silla-era rock carving of Buddha the temple is famous for

- Location within South Korea

Religion
- Affiliation: Jogye Order of Korean Buddhism

Location
- Location: 101-5 Gimrim-ro, Yangbuk-myeon, Gyeongju, North Gyeongsang Province, South Korea
- Coordinates: 35°48′11″N 129°24′20″E

Golgulsa (Korean: 골굴사; Hanja: 骨窟寺; lit. 'Stone Buddha Temple') is a Buddhist temple in Gyeongju, South Korea. It dates to the Silla period.

== History ==
Gogulsa was established on Mt. Hamwolsan, along with Girimsa, by Master Gwangyu and his retinue who came to Korea from India about 1,500 years ago. Gogulsa is the oldest grotto temple in Korea, emulating those in India.

According to a painting of Jeong Seon (pen name; Gyeomjae) during the mid-Joseon era, Gogulsa was established by constructing a wooden antechapel in front of several stone grottoes and covering it with tiles. The temple was left in ruins after it was burnt down in the mid to late Joseon era. Then about 70 years ago, the Bak clan of Gyeongju moved there and began reconstruction. The temple was sold to an individual in 1989, but Ven. Seol Jeogun, then head of Girimsa, eventually purchased it. Currently Golgulsa is registered as a branch temple of Bulguksa, the head temple of the 11th religious district, Jogye Order of Korean Buddhism.

The seated rock-carved Buddha (Treasure No. 581), the main Buddha of Gogulsa, faces the underwater tomb of King Munmu, and around the Buddha are many grotto Dharma halls, such as Avalokitesvara Grotto, Ksitigarbha Grotto, Medicine Buddha Grotto, Arhat Grotto and Guardian Deities Hall. There are also relics of traditional folk religions such as rocks carved into phalluses and vaginas.

Recently ex-Master Monk of Kirimsa (Kirim Temple), Seol Jeog-un constructed a road while simultaneously renovating the Gogulsa.

== Cultural properties ==
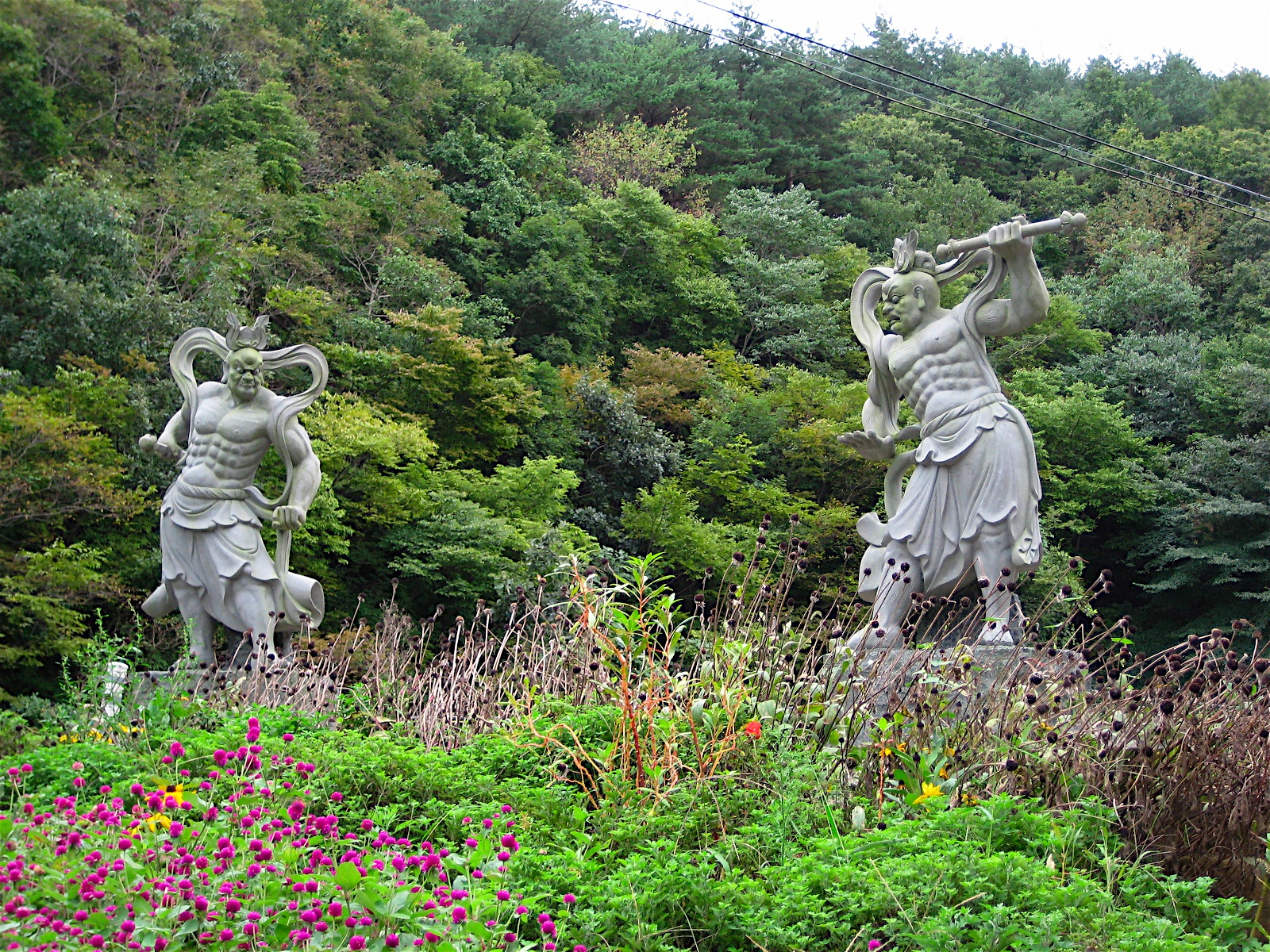
Statues of a Deva king

The seated rock-carved Buddha of Gogulsa was carved into the volcanic tuff cliff in the 9th century during the United Silla Dynasty; it is the main Buddha of the temple. The statue gazes toward the Sea of Japan with a gentle smile and beautiful nimbus in which luxurious lotuses and flames are carved.

Nearer the ocean, about 10 kilometers (6 miles) from Gogulsa, are the Gameunsa Temple ruins and the underwater tomb of King Munmu. Located southeast of the seated rock-carved Buddha, the ruins of Gameunsa Temple consist of two Three-Story Stone Pagodas (National Treasure No. 112). Standing 13.4 meters (44 feet) high, the two pagodas are aesthetically pleasing and well balanced; they are regarded as the standard of Korean stone pagodas.

Southeast of the ruins lies a small rocky island rising from the ocean; this is the underwater tomb of King Munmu and it is a symbol of King Munmu's will to fend off the invading Japanese even in death. The tomb was established on this rock which is about 200 meters (656 feet) in circumference. Two waterways form a cross shape that divides the island, one running east to west and the other north to south. In a sunken area in the center is a small pool: that is his tomb.

== The Breath of Seon ==
Sunmudo training is composed of: “still training,” which includes “chwason,” or sitting meditation, yoga-like exercises as well as “active training,” which includes gymnastics and martial arts. There is usually “still training” in the morning and “active training” in the evening.

Gogulsa occupies half a mountain and actually contains several temples, administrative building, training hall, several dormitories, dining hall, and so on.

== Sunmudo Martial Art ==
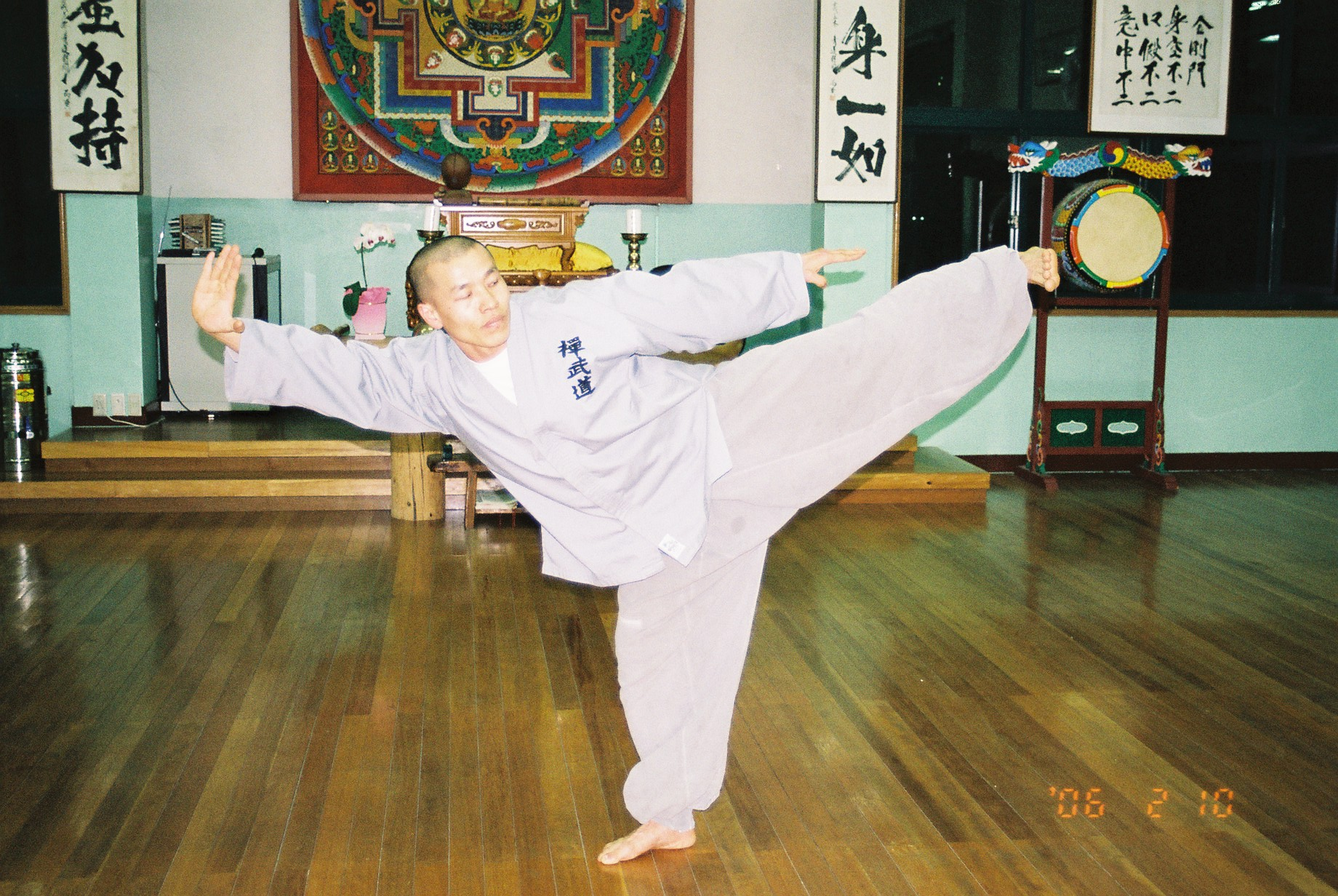
Golgulsa monk practicing Sunmudo

In recent years Gogulsa has established the Seonmudo Practice Center to teach this traditional Buddhist martial art.

The formal name of Sunmudo is Bulgyo Geumgang Yeong Gwon. It is a training method taught at Gogulsa designed to extinguish worldly pains and attain enlightenment. The goal of this training is harmonization of mind and body united with breathing.

Gogulsa has run Sunmudo training programs since 1992 for those who would like to experience the traditions of Korean Seon (Zen) Buddhism including Sonmudo.

== Tourism ==
It also offers temple stay programs where visitors can experience Buddhist culture.
