= Sunmudo =

Korean Buddhist martial art

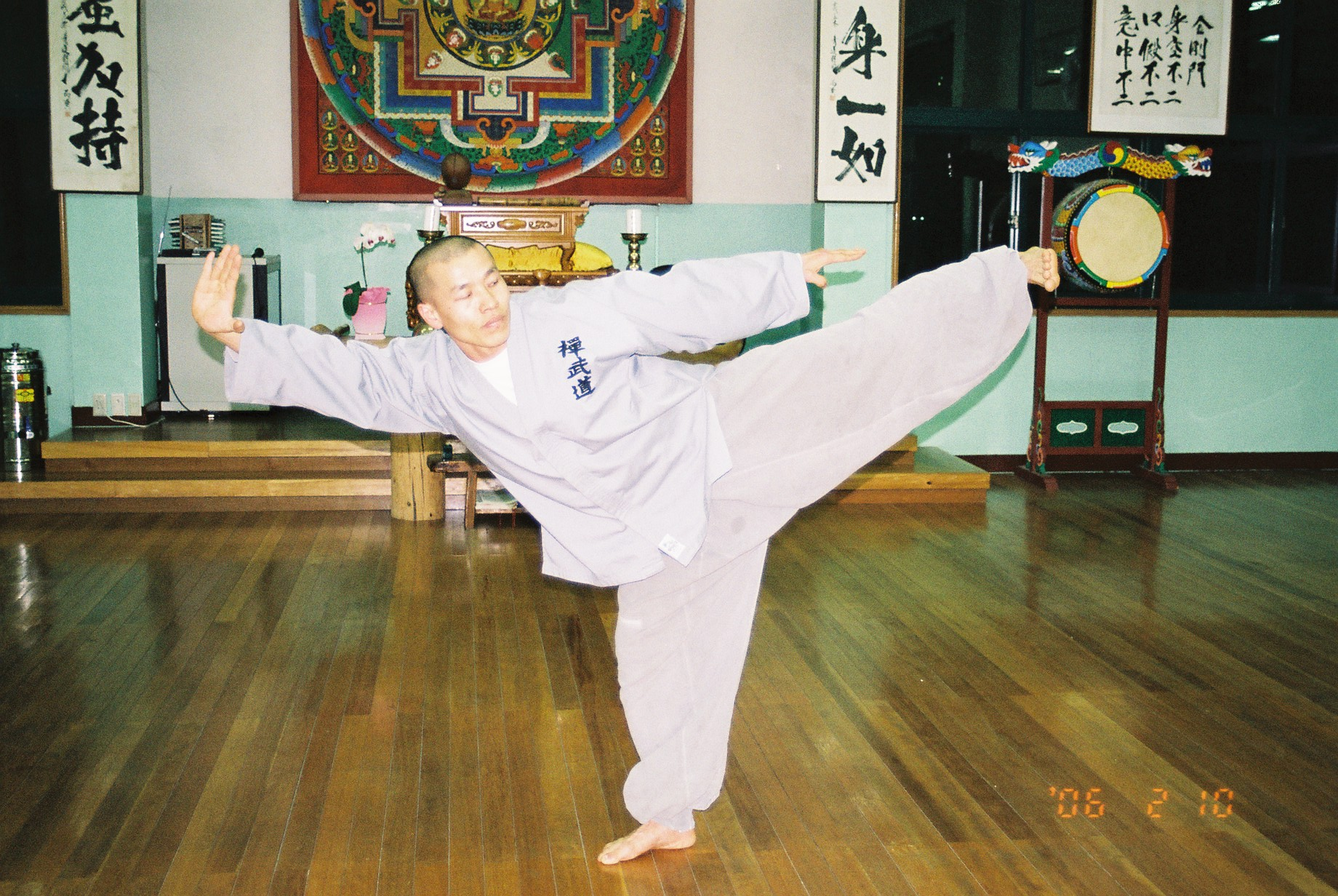
Golgulsa monk practicing Sunmudo

Sunmudo (선무도/禪武道, literally Zen martial way) is a Korean Buddhist martial art based on Seon (also spelled Sun or Zen), which was revived during the 1970s and 1980s. The formal name of Sunmudo is Bulgyo Geumgang Yeong Gwan (Hangul: 불교금강영관 Hanja: 佛敎金剛靈觀). The name Sunmudo was given to this martial art in 1984 by the Buddhist monk Jeog Un (적운 스님).

In earlier times Korean Buddhist monks were encouraged to practice Zen martial arts as a way of dynamic meditation. In the 16th century, Korean monks used swords, knives, spears and throwing stars to help repel a Japanese invasion. However, the temple of the Korean monks was burned by retreating troops in revenge. In the 1930s and 1940s, a rebuilt Beomeosa temple became center for the monks' underground resistance to Japanese occupation. However, the martial art of Sunmudo had been neglected since the 19th century. At Beomeosa temple located in Busan, Monk Yang-ik revived the art by systematizing the techniques. Monk Jeogun worked on its popularization during the 1970s. These days training is offered to non-Buddhists and laypersons at Golgulsa temple in Korea, and other places around the world as well.

== See also ==
- Korean Buddhism
- Korean martial arts
