= Richard Herrera =

Malaysian actor

- Other name: Rich Herrera
- Occupations: Actor, TV host
- Spouse: Sharon B Tan

Richard Herrera, a.k.a. Rich Herrera, is a television actor/host and former MTV VJ. Herrera along with Richard Hardin, representing the Philippines, won The Amazing Race Asia 4 in 2010. He joined MTV Asia in 2011 as a MTV VJ, hosting Pimp My Ride Malaysia. Herrera along with Hardin provided voiceovers for The Price Is Right on ABS-CBN in 2011.

== Filmography ==
=== Movies ===
Year	Title	Role	Notes	Reference(s)
2013	Chasing Fire	Shane	Philippines	
2015	Selfie, The Movie	Detective James	Cambodia, Singapore	
2017	Wonder Boy	Ross	Singapore	
2018	Crazy Rich Asians			

== See also ==
- The Amazing Race Asia
- Pimp My Ride
