= Pura Lingsar =

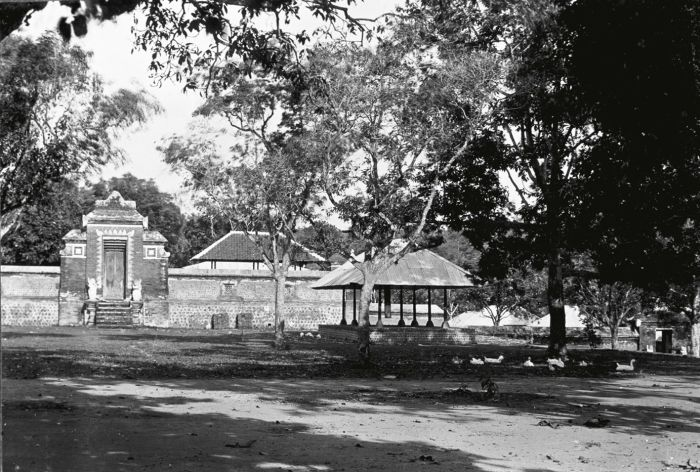
- Inner gate view between 1910 - 1925
- Interactive map of the Pura Lingsar area

General information
- Type: Pura
- Architectural style: Balinese
- Location: Selagalas, Cakranegara Subdistrict, Mataram (city), West Nusa Tenggara, Jalan Gora 2, Selagalah, Cakranegara, West Lombok, West Nusa Tenggara, Indonesia
- Coordinates: 8°34′32.91″S 116°10′48.49″E
- Estimated completion: 17th century

Pura Lingsar is a Balinese temple built by Anak Agung Ngurah of Karangasem in 1714, located 15 km from Mataram. Lingsar originates from the sasak language and means "clear revelation from God". The area has a spring, which is considered sacred by the local Sasak people, especially those who believe in Wetu Telu (syncretic Islam and traditional Sasak beliefs).

== Building ==
Some parts of the Lingsar Park complex have been taken over which used to have an area of 40,000 m², leaving only half of it, in the complex there are 2 religious buildings of Pura and Kemaliq, of which there are 3 large ponds and a public bath.

== Festival ==
The festival at Pura Lingsar is held every 6th full moon or purnamaning sasih kenem on Balinese saka calendar dan 7th full moon or sasih kepitu on Sasak calendar. When festival there will held ritual Perang Topat and attraction of Batek Baris accccompanied by gendang beleq

== Batek Baris ==
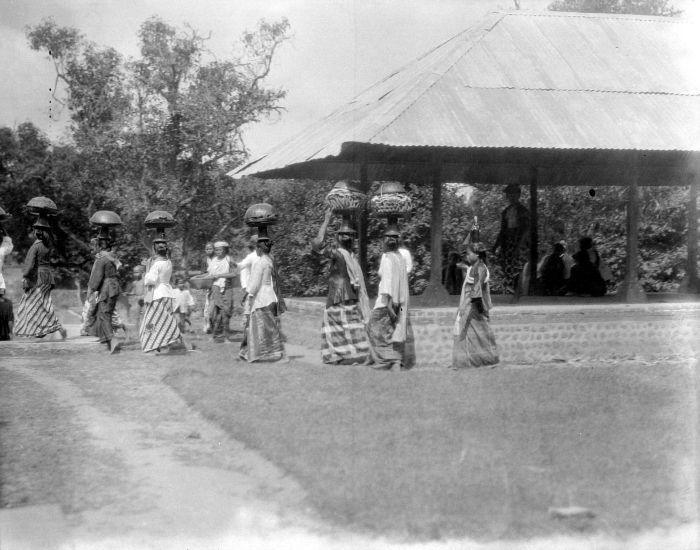
Mendak pesaji at 1929

When the festival was held, the first procession was called mendak pesaji, which was an accompaniment of offerings marching into area of the pura, in front of the offerings there were dancers Batek Baris, who dressed in the Dutch East Indies army, the dancers spoke Dutch but using sasak accent, where the dancer is accompanied by music Gendang beleq

== Topat War ==
Topat war is an attraction carried out by both Hindus and Muslims, where the war uses ketupat as its weapon. This war was carried out after the two residents made a prayer, both lined up facing each other to throw ketupat. At the end of the war the both residents will collect scattered ketupat to be buried in the rice fields, they believe that if do that it will fertilize their land.
