= Girimsa =

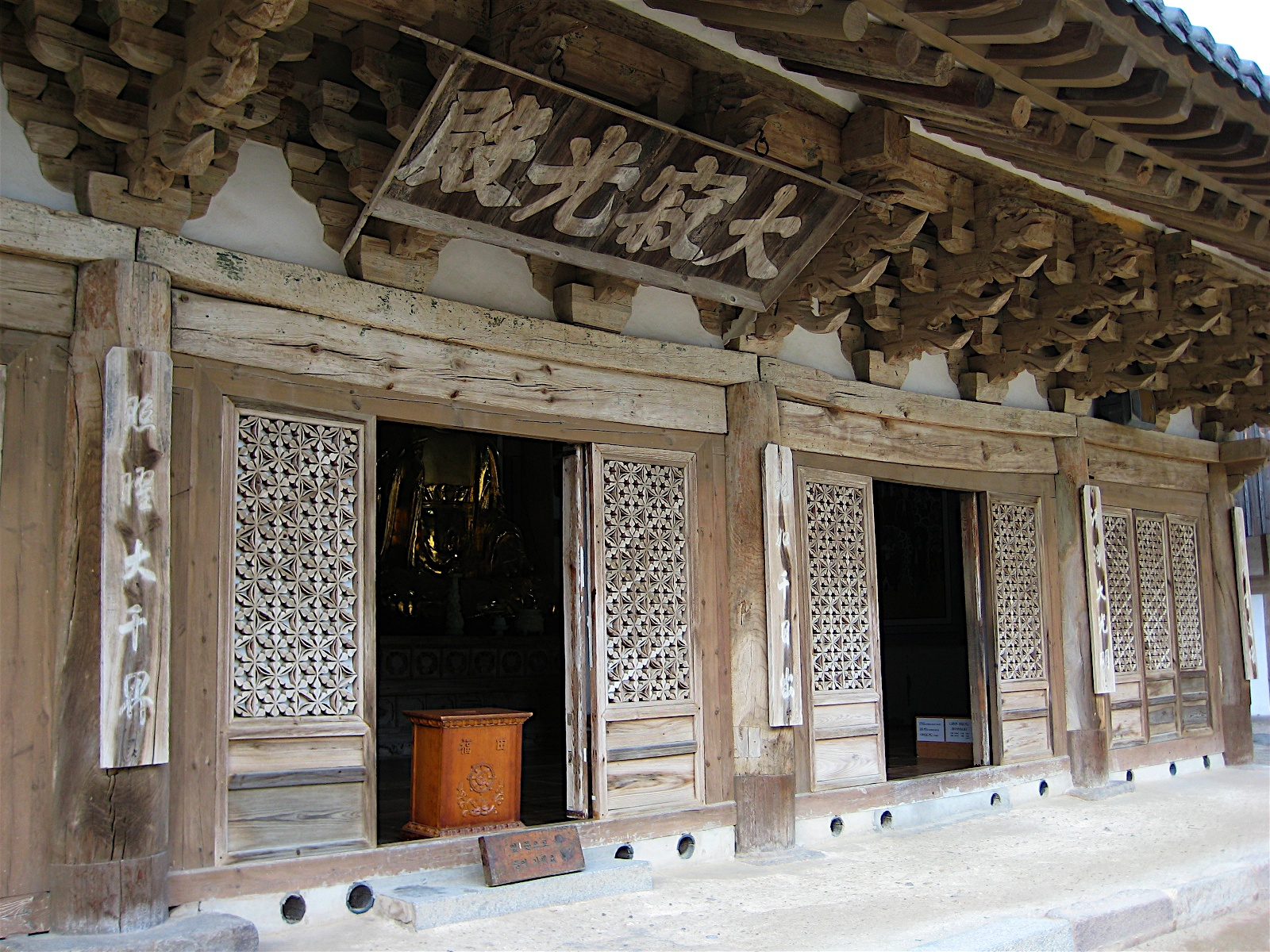
- Daejeokgwangjeon hall at Girimsa

Korean name
- Hangul: 기림사
- Hanja: 祗林寺
- RR: Girimsa
- MR: Kirimsa

Girimsa is a Buddhist temple located on the slopes of Mount Hamwolsan in Gyeongju city, the North Gyeongsang Province, South Korea. It is a subsidiary temple of Bulguksa, the head temple of the 11th branch of Jogye Order. The temple was first established by Monk Gwangyu from India as Imjeongsa (林井寺) in 643, the period of Queen Seondeok's reign (r. 632-647 AD) during the Silla kingdom period (57 BC–935 AD).

After monk Wonhyo rebuilt the temple, the temple's name was changed to Girimsa which name derives from "Girim jeongsa" (祈園精舍), meaning the forest where Buddha resided. Once it was the biggest temple in the Gyeongju area until the mid-1940s, even having Bulguksa as its branch temple. However, the situation has been changed - while Bulguksa has thrived onwards, Girimsa has not due to the accessibility. Yet, the temple consists of 16 buildings containing Daejeokgwangjeon hall (大寂光殿), Yaksajeon hall and Eungjinjeon hall and others. In addition to the buildings, Girimasa has relics such as Moktap Site, Three-Story Stone Pagoda and the lacquered Seated Mercy Bodhisattva of Girimsa Temple (Treasure No. 415).

== Gallery ==
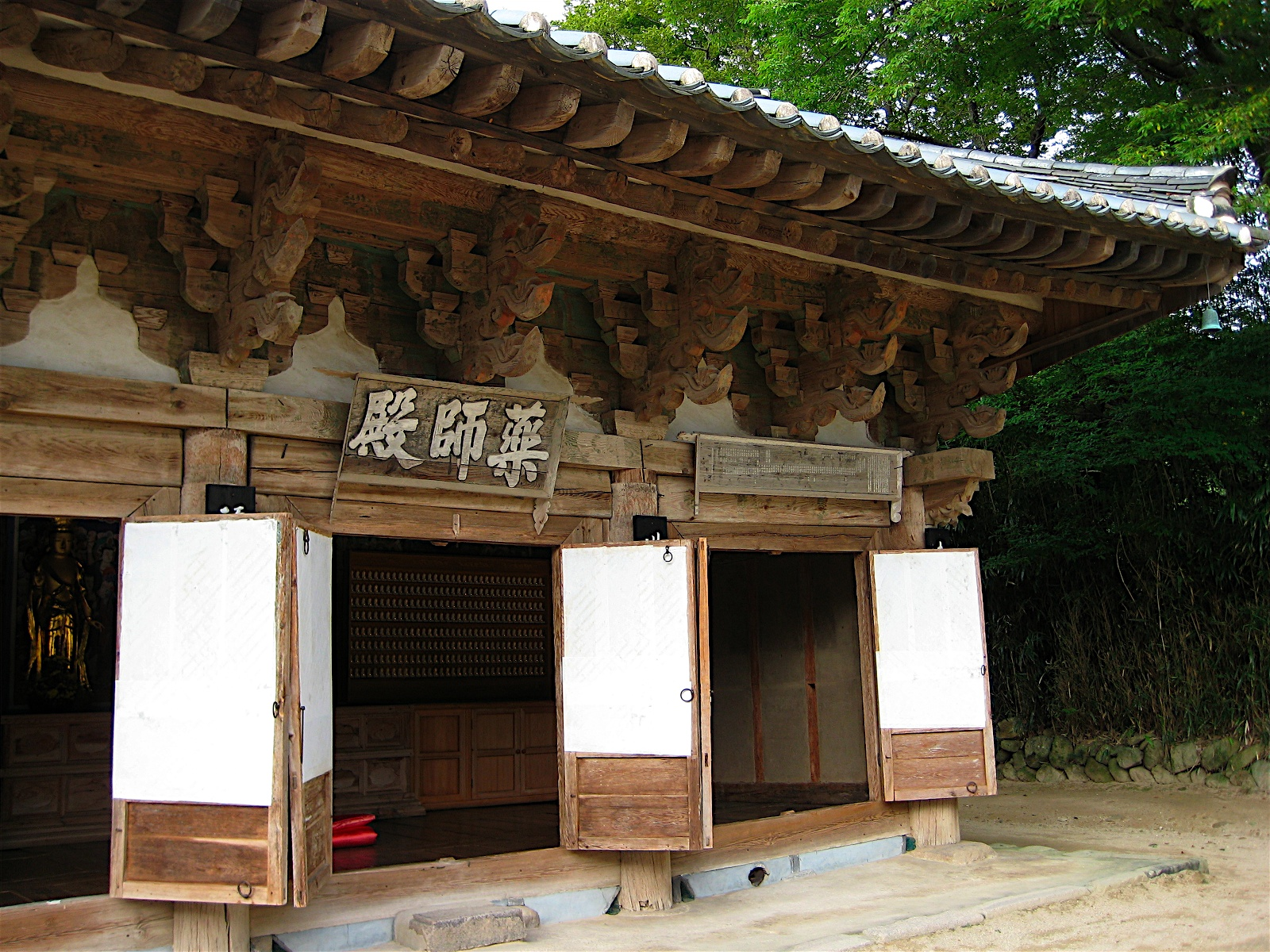
Yaksajeon hall

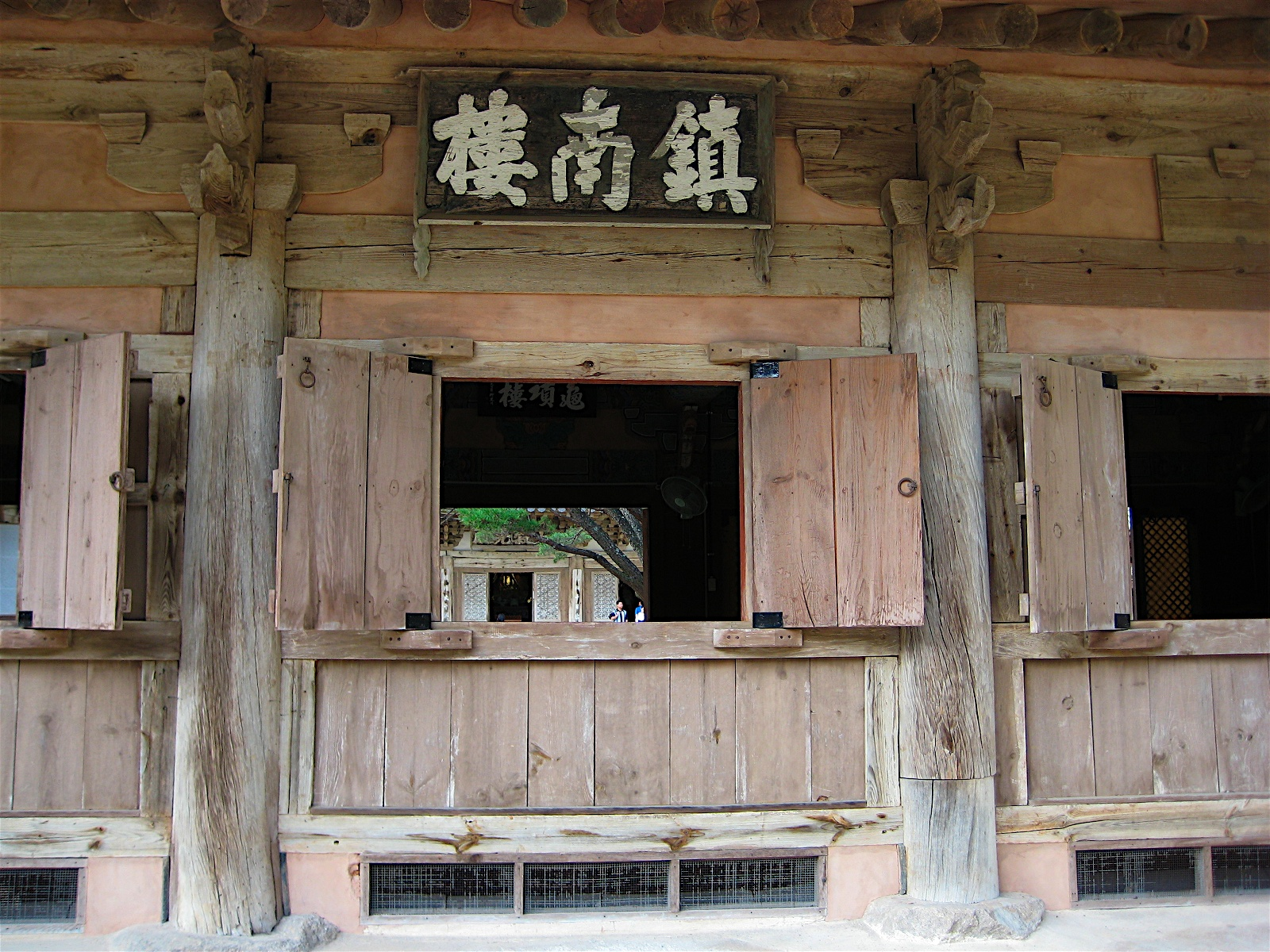
Jinnamnu

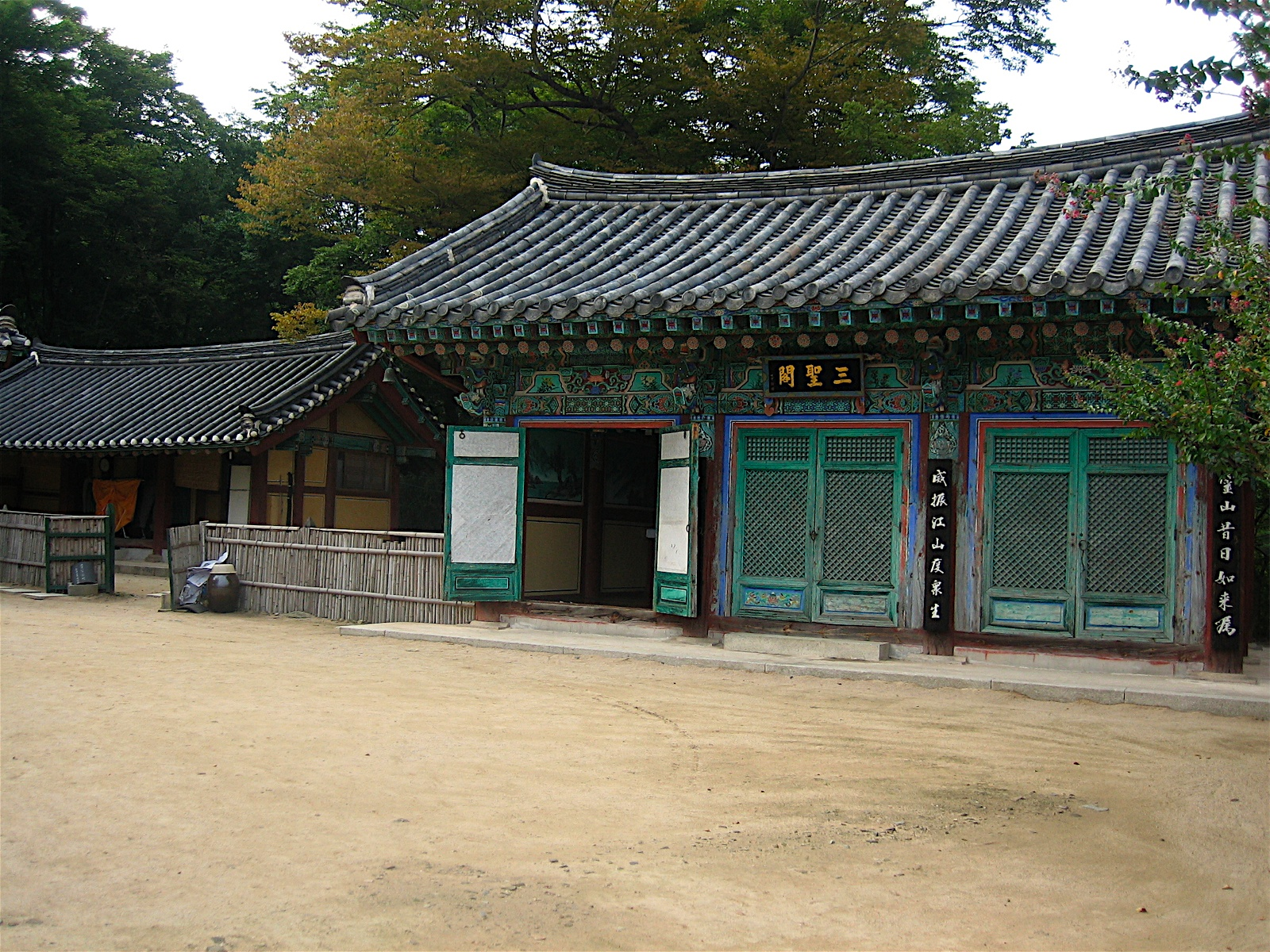
Samseonggak

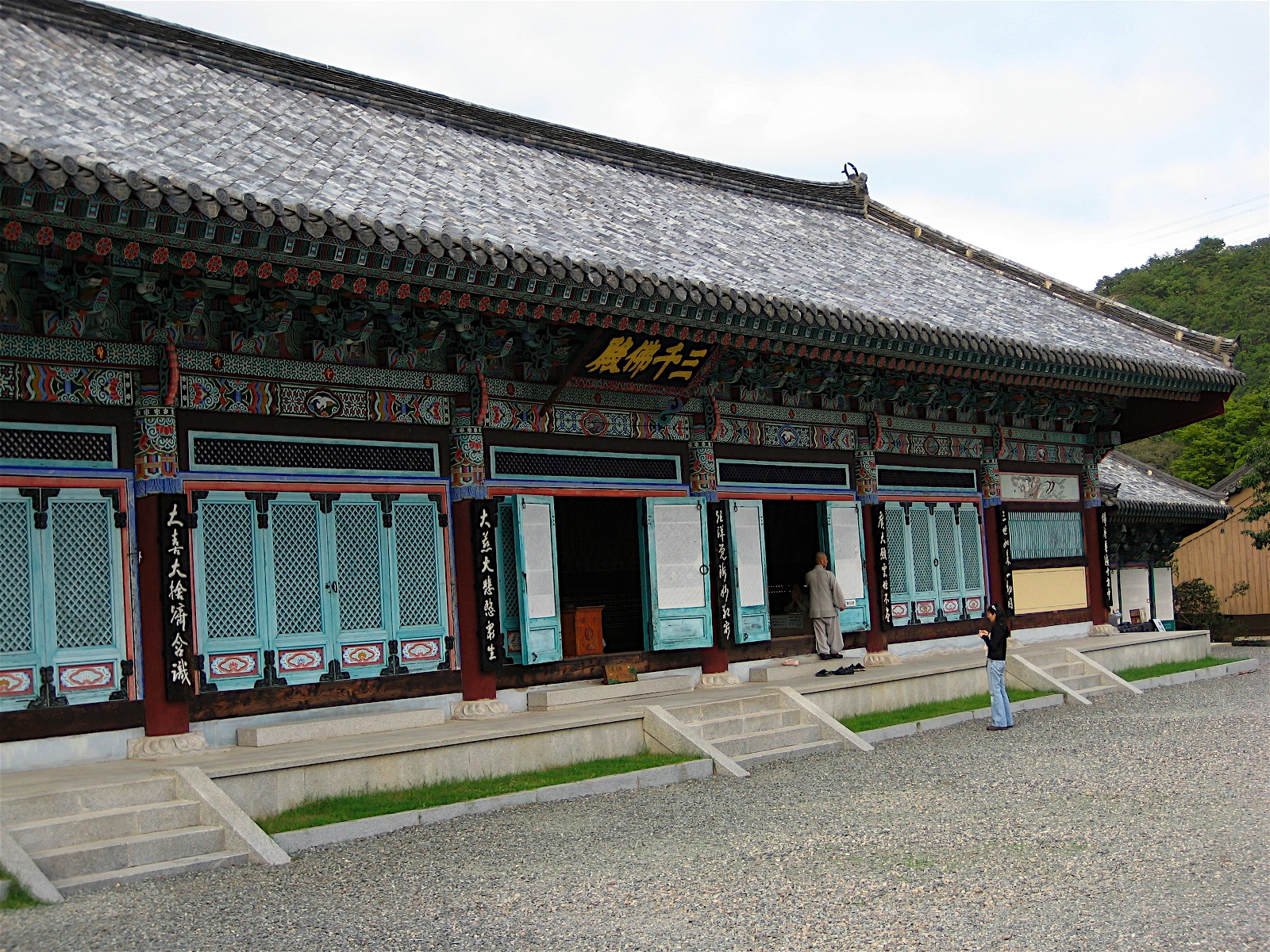
Samcheonbuljeon

== See also ==
- Bulguksa
- Korean Buddhist temples
- Tourism in Gyeongju
