= List of Miss Universe Philippines localities =

Miss Universe Philippines selects the country's representative to Miss Universe. This is a list of the localities that have sent delegates to compete in the national pageant. Since 2024, the accredited partners of the pageant have been the sole basis of candidate selection for the competition.

== Background ==
Ahead of the 2023 edition, Miss Universe Philippines introduced the accredited partners program, responsible for the selection of delegates for the annual competition through local pageants or appointments. The program went into effect from the 2024 pageant onwards.

== Active Entrants ==
=== Province/Region ===
As of 2026, 26 province and regions are sending a delegate in the competition.

Localities	Debut	Participations	Years competed	Placements	Best placement	Recent placement	Notes
Albay	2020	6	2020–2022; 2024–present	4	2021: Janela Joy Cuaton (Top 10)	2026: Alexandra Oriño (Top 30)	
Bohol	2020	6	2020; 2022–present	3	2023: Pauline Amelinckx (Top 5)	2025: Tyra Goldman (Top 12)	
Camiguin	2024	3	2024–present	1	2026: Erica Cadayday (Top 15)	2026: Erica Cadayday (Top 15)	
Cavite	2020	6	2020–2021; 2023–present	4	2021: Victoria Velasquez Vincent (MUPH – Charity)	2026: Jencel Caña (Top 30)	
Cebu	2020	5	2020–2024; 2026–present	6	2026: Nicole Borromeo (Top 7)	2026: Nicole Borromeo (Top 7)	
Cotabato	2026	1	2026–present	1	2026: Clarissa Westram (Top 30)	2026: Clarissa Westram (Top 30)	
Ilocos Norte	2026	1	2026–present	1	2026: Charieze Cacayorin (Top 30)	2026: Charieze Cacayorin (Top 30)	The delegate in 2026 concurrently represented the Filipino Society of Hawaii, U.S.
Iloilo	2020	4	2020; 2022; 2025–present	1	2022: Vanessa Caro (Top 10)	2022: Vanessa Caro (Top 10)	Won Best in National Costume in 2025 and 2026; The delegate in 2025 concurrently represented the Filipino Society of England, Great Britain
La Union	2020	2	2020; 2026–present	1	2026: Bea Millan-Windorski (Winner)	2026: Bea Millan-Windorski (Winner)	
Laguna	2020	6	2020–2022; 2024–present	5	2021: Leren Bautista (Top 10)	2026: Ysabel Prats (Top 30)	
Leyte	2024	3	2024–present	1	2024: Angel Rose Tambal (Top 20)	2024: Angel Rose Tambal (Top 20)	The delegate in 2025 concurrently represented the Filipino Society of Florida, U.S.
Mountain Province	2026	1	2026–present	1	2026: Lyneree Montero-Yodong (Top 30)	2026: Lyneree Montero-Yodong (Top 30)	
Negros Occidental	2025	2	2025–present	1	2026: Alex Colmenares (Top 15)	2026: Alex Colmenares (Top 15)	Won Best in National Costume in 2026
Negros Oriental	2021	4	2021–2023; 2026–present	0			
Nueva Ecija	2024	3	2024–present	2	2024: Maica Martinez (Top 20)	2025: Chanel Thomas (Top 24)	The delegate in 2025 concurrently represented the Filipino Society of Melbourne, Australia and in 2026 concurrently represented the Filipino Society of the United Kingdom
Nueva Vizcaya	2022	2	2022; 2026–present	1	2022: Gillian Katherine de Mesa (Top 16)	2022: Gillian Katherine de Mesa (Top 16)	The delegate in 2026 concurrently represented the Filipino Society of Washington, U.S.
Occidental Mindoro	2023	5	2023–present	1	2025: Ain Niqyla Abad (Top 24)	2025: Ain Niqyla Abad (Top 24)	
Palawan	2020	5	2020; 2022–2024; 2026–present	2	2022: Angelica Lopez (Top 10)	2024: Raven Doctor (Top 20)	
Pampanga	2020	6	2020; 2022–present	3	2023: Angelique Manto (2nd Runner-Up)	2026: Allyson Hetland (Top 7)	
Pangasinan	2020	6	2020–2023; 2024–present	2	2021: Maureen Wroblewitz (3rd Runner-Up)	2026: Donna Nuguid (Top 30)	
Quezon	2020	6	2020; 2022–present	3	2025: Ahtisa Manalo (Winner)	2026: Patricia Evangelista (Top 15)	The delegate in 2026 concurrently represented the Filipino Society of Australia
Rizal	2020	2	2020; 2026–present	1	2026: Alicia Buendia (Top 30)	2026: Alicia Buendia (Top 30)	The delegate in 2026 concurrently represented the Filipino Society of Southern California, U.S.
Samar Island	2025	2	2025–present	1	2026: Catherine Wardle (Top 30)	2026: Catherine Wardle (Top 30)	
Sarangani	2026	1	2026–present	1	2026: Nicole Cruz (Top 30)	2026: Nicole Cruz (Top 30)	The delegate in 2026 concurrently represented the Filipino Society of West Asia
Southern Leyte	2023	2	2023; 2026–present	0			
Sultan Kudarat	2025	2	2025–present	2	2025: Chelsea Fernandez (Top 6)	2026: Jenrose Javier (Top 7)	Won Best in National Costume in 2025
Tarlac	2025	2	2025–present	2	2026: Marian Arellano (Top 7)	2026: Marian Arellano (Top 7)	

=== City/Municipality ===
As of 2026, there are currently 24 cities/municipalities that are currently active sending a delegate in the competition.

Localities	Debut	Participations	Years competed	Placements	Recent placement	Best placement	Notes
Bacolod City	2023	4	2023–present	1	2024: Jan Marie Bordon (Top 18)	2023: Jan Marie Bordon (Top 18)	
Bacoor City	2023	4	2023–present	1	2024: Victoria Velasquez Vincent (Top 10)	2024: Victoria Velasquez Vincent (Top 10)	
Baguio City	2020	6	2020; 2022–present	5	2026: Roxie Baeyens (Top 15)	2024: Tarah Valencia (3rd Runner-Up)	Won Best in National Costume in 2025 & 2026
Cabanatuan City	2024	4	2024; 2026–present	0			The delegate in 2026 concurrently represented the Filipino Society of Alberta, Canada
Cebu City	2020	6	2020–present	5	2026: Apriel Smith (Top 7)	2021: Beatrice Gomez (Winner)	
Dasmariñas City	2025	1	2026–present	0			Won Photogenic in 2020; Won Best in Swimsuit and Evening Gown in 2021
Iligan City	2025	2	2025–present	2	2026: Trexy Roxas (Top 30)	2025: Juliana Fresado (Top 12)	
Iloilo City	2020	7	2020–present	4	2026: Zestah Espinosa (Top 15)	2020: Rabiya Mateo (Winner)	Won Best in National Costume in 2024
Kalibo, Aklan	2025	2	2025–present	0			The delegate in 2026 withdrew from the pageant
Las Piñas City	2022	3	2022; 2025–present	0			The delegate in 2025 and 2026 concurrently represented a Filipino Society.; Won Miss Congeniality in 2026
Los Baños, Laguna	2025	2	2025–present	0			
Luisiana, Laguna	2026	1	2026–present	1	2026: Ashley Subijano (Top 30)	2026: Ashley Subijano (Top 30)	
Manila City	2020	5	2020–2021; 2024–present	3	2025: Justine Felizarta (Top 15)	2025: Justine Felizarta (Top 15)	Won Best in Swimsuit in 2026
Muntinlupa City	2020	3	2020; 2025–present	2	2026: Adela-Mae Marshall (Top 15)	2025: Winwyn Marquez (1st Runner-Up)	
Parañaque City	2020	5	2020–2021; 2023; 2025–present	3	2023: Clare Dacanay (Top 18)	2020: Bella Ysmael (1st Runner-Up)	The delegate in 2025 concurrently represented the Filipino Society of Los Angeles, California, U.S,
Pateros City	2026	1	2026–present	0			Won Miss Photogenic in 2026
San Carlos City	2025	1	2026–present	0			
San Jose, Negros Oriental	2026	1	2026–present	1	2026: Jayka Munsayac (Top 30)	2026: Jayka Munsayac (Top 30)	The delegate in 2026 concurrently represented the Filipino Society of Bellevue, Washington, U.S.
Santo Tomas, La Union	2026	1	2026–present	1	2026: Rachel-Hanna Gozum (Top 30)	2026: Rachel-Hanna Gozum (Top 30)	The delegate in 2026 concurrently represented the Filipino Society of Seattle, Washington, U.S.
Taal, Batangas	2026	1	2026–present	0			The delegate in 2026 concurrently represented the Filipino Society of Northern California, U.S.
Tacloban City	2024	3	2024–present	2	2026: Jacqueline Gulrajani (Top 15)	2026: Jacqueline Gulrajani (Top 15)	Won Best in National Costume in 2024 and 2026
Taguig City	2020	7	2020–present	6	2026: Bella Ysmael (Top 7)	2024: Christi McGarry (4th Runner-Up)	
Tandag City	2025	2	2025–present	1	2026: Chrystel Correos (Top 30)	2026: Chrystel Correos (Top 30)	
Tuguegarao City	2024	3	2024–present	0			

== Filipino Societies ==
Since 2025, all of the delegates coming from the Filipino Societies must represent their local locality in the Philippines.

Filipino Society Localities	Represented Filipino Localities	Year	Delegate	Placements
Alberta, Canada	Cabanatuan City	2026	Ryla Hernandez	Unplaced
Australia	None	2024	Kymberlee Street	Top 20
Australia	Camarines Norte	2025	Karenza de Leon	Unplaced
Australia	Quezon	2026	Patricia Evangelista	Top 15
Bellevue, Washington, U.S.	San Jose, Negros Oriental	2026	Jayka Munsayac	Top 30
Eastern Canada	San Jose, Batangas	2025	Jessica Cianchino	Unplaced
England	Iloilo	2025	Angeline Kailani	Best in National Costume
Florida, U.S.	None	2024	Matea Smith	Unplaced
Florida, U.S.	Leyte	2025	Victoria Johnson	Unplaced
Florida, U.S.	Las Piñas City	2026	Avegail Kultsar	Miss Congeniality
Great Britain	Dumaguete City	2025	Shamara Krupa	Unplaced
Hawaii, U.S.	None	2024	Bianca Tapia	Top 20
Hawaii, U.S.	Davao Region	2025	Angeleyh Pasco	Top 24
Hawaii, U.S.	Ilocos Norte	2026	Charieze Cacayorin	Top 30
Los Angeles, California, U.S.	Parañaque City	2026	Pauline Galvez	Unplaced
Melbourne, Australia	Nueva Ecija	2025	Chanel Thomas	Top 24
Miami, Florida, U.S.	None	2024	Mary Yasol	Unplaced
New Jersey, U.S.	Liliw, Laguna	2025	Pauline del Mundo	Unplaced
New York, U.S.	Ifugao	2025	Valerie West	Top 24 & Best in National Costume
Northern California, U.S.	None	2024	Kayla Carter	Top 20
Northern California, U.S.	Caloocan City	2025	Allyson Ee	Best in National Costume
Northern California, U.S.	Taal, Batangas	2026	Juliana Aquino	Unplaced
Pennsylvania, U.S.	Pasay City	2025	Amanda Russo	Top 12
San Francisco, California, U.S.	Bago City	2025	Kayla Usison	Unplaced
Saudi Arabia	Sarangani	2026	Nicole Cruz	Top 30
Seattle, Washington, U.S.	Santo Tomas, La Union	2026	Rachel-Hanna Gozum	Top 30
Southern California, U.S.	None	2024	Janet Hammond	Best in National Costume
Southern California, U.S.	Malay, Aklan	2025	Taylor DeLuna	Top 24
Southern California, U.S.	Rizal	2026	Alicia Buendia	Top 30
Sydney, Australia	None	2024	Jenina Lui	Unplaced
Sydney, Australia	Lucena City	2025	Bella Dela Cruz	Top 24
United Kingdom	None	2024	Christina Chalk	Top 20
United Kingdom	Nueva Ecija	2026	Michelle Burchell	Unplaced
Virginia, U.S.	None	2024	Denise Nicole	Unplaced
Virginia, U.S.	Naga City	2025	Zoe Gabon	Unplaced
Washington, U.S.	Ilocos Sur	2025	Jeanne Nicole Lipa	Unplaced
Washington, U.S.	Nueva Vizcaya	2026	Jacqueline Aluning	Unplaced
Western Canada	Las Piñas City	2025	Kristel David	Top 24

== Inactive entrants ==
=== Province/Region ===
Localities	Debut	Participations	Years competed	Placements	Recent placement	Best placement	Notes
Agusan del Norte	2023	1	2023	1	2023: Jannarie Zarzoso (Top 18)	2023: Jannarie Zarzoso (Top 18)	
Aklan	2020	4	2020–2023	3	2022: Jona Sweett (Top 16)	2021: Janela Joy Cuaton (Top 10)	
Antique	2020	2	2020–2021	0			
Apayao	2023	1	2023	1			
Batanes	2020	2	2020; 2022	0			
Batangas	2020	5	2020; 2023–2025	0			The delegate in 2025 changed her sash to Bohol in the middle of the competition.
Benguet	2022	2	2022; 2025	1	2025: Maiko Ibarde (Top 25)	2025: Maiko Ibarde (Top 24)	Won Best in National Costume in 2023
Biliran	2020	1	2020	1	2020: Skelly Ivy Florida (Top 16)	2020: Skelly Ivy Florida (Top 16)	
Bukidnon	2021	2	2022; 2024	0			
Bulacan	2020	5	2020; 2023–2025	5	2024: Chelsea Manalo (Winner)	2024: Chelsea Manalo (Winner)	
Cagayan	2020	1	2020	0			
Camarines Norte	2025	1	2025	0			The delegate in 2025 concurrently represented the Filipino Society of Australia
Camarines Sur	2020	2	2020; 2025	0			
Capiz	2023	1	2023	1			
Catanduanes	2020	1	2020	0			
Davao del Norte	2020	2	2020; 2022	0			
Davao del Sur	2021	2	2021–2022	0			
Davao Occidental	2021	1	2021	0			
Davao Oriental	2023	1	2023	1	2023: Klyza de Castro (Top 18)	2023: Klyza de Castro (Top 18)	
Davao Region	2025	1	2025	1	2025: Angeleyh Pasco (Top 24)	2025: Angeleyh Pasco (Top 24)	The delegate in 2025 concurrently represented the Filipino Society of Hawaii, U.S.
Eastern Samar	2023	1	2023	1	2023: Airissh Ramos (Top 18)	2023: Airissh Ramos (Top 18)	
Guimaras	2023	1	2023	0			
Ilocos Sur	2020	3	2020; 2022; 2025	1	2022: Jewel Palacat (Top 16)	2022: Jewel Palacat (Top 16)	The delegate in 2025 concurrently represented the Filipino Society of Washington , U.S.
Isabela	2020	4	2020–2021; 2023; 2025	2	2025: Jarina Sandhu (Top 24)	2023: Kimberlyn Acob (Top 18)	
Ifugao	2025	1	2025	1	2025: Valerie West (Top 24)	2025: Valerie West (Top 24)	The delegate in 2026 concurrently represented the Filipino Society of New York, U.S.
Kalinga	2020	1	2020	0			
Marinduque	2020	3	2020–2021; 2023	1	2023: Christine Salcedo (Top 18)	2023: Christine Salcedo (Top 18)	
Masbate	2021	1	2021	1	2021: Kisses Delavin (Top 10)	2023: Kisses Delavin (Top 10)	
Misamis Oriental	2020	3	2020–2022	3	2022: Annabelle McDonnell (1st Runner-Up)	2022: Annabelle McDonnell (1st Runner-Up)	
Northern Samar	2023	1	2023	1			
Oriental Mindoro	2020	2	2020; 2025	1	2024: Rechel Hoco (Top 24)	2025: Rechel Hoco (Top 24)	
Quirino	2024	2	2024–2025	1	2025: Bianca Ylanan (Top 12)	2025: Bianca Ylanan (Top 12)	
Romblon	2024	3	2020–2021; 2025	2	2021: Jane Nicole Minaño (Top 16)	2021: Jane Nicole Minaño (Top 16)	
Sorsogon	2023	1	2023	1	2023: Rein Hillary Carrascal (Top 18)	2023: Rein Hillary Carrascal (Top 18)	
Surigao del Norte	2020	2	2020; 2023	0			
Zambales	2023	2	2023–2024	2	2024: Anita Rose Gomez (Top 10)	2023: CJ Opiaza (1st Runner-Up)	
Zamboanga del Sur	2020	1	2020	0			

=== City/Municipality ===
Localities	Debut	Participations	Years competed	Placements	Recent placement	Best placement	Notes
Angeles City	2023	3	2020–2021; 2025	1	2021: Mirjan Hipolito (Top 16)	2021: Mirjan Hipolito (Top 16)	
Bago City	2025	1	2025	0			The delegate in 2025 concurrently represented the Filipino Society of San Francisco, California, U.S.
Bantayan Island	2024	1	2024	0			
Basey, Samar	2025	1	2025	0			
Butuan City	2025	1	2025	0			
Cagayan de Oro City	2021	2	2021; 2020	0			
Cainta, Rizal	2024	1	2024	1	2024: Stacey Gabriel (1st Runner-Up)	2024: Stacey Gabriel (1st Runner-Up)	
Caloocan City	2025	1	2025	0			The delegate in 2025 concurrently represented the Filipino Society of Northern California; Won Best in National Costume in 2025
Davao City	2020	2	2020; 2024	1	2020: Alaiza Flor Malinao (Top 16)	2023: Alaiza Flor Malinao (Top 16)	
Dipolog City	2025	1	2025	0			
Dumaguete City	2025	1	2025	0			The delegate in 2025 concurrently represented the Filipino Society of Great Britain
General Santos City	2020	1	2020	1			
Guipos, Zamboanga del Sur	2025	1	2025	0			
Kananga, Leyte	2024	1	2024	0			
Lapu-Lapu City	2022	3	2022–2023; 2025	0			
Liliw, Laguna	2025	1	2025	0			The delegate in 2025 concurrently represented the Filipino Society of New Jersey, U.S.
Lucban, Quezon	2024	1	2024	0			
Lucena City	2022	2	2022; 2025	1	2025: Bella Dela Cruz (Top 24)	2025: Bella Dela Cruz (Top 24)	The delegate in 2025 concurrently represented the Filipino Society of Sydney, Australia
Makati City	2020	4	2020–2023	3	2023: Michelle Dee (Winner)	2023: Michelle Dee (Winner)	
Malay, Aklan	2025	1	2025	1	2025: Taylor DeLuna (Top 24)	2025: Taylor DeLuna (Top 24)	The delegate in 2025 concurrently represented the Filipino Society of Southern California, U.S.
Mandaluyong City	2021	2	2021; 2023	2	2023: Iman Cristal (Top 18)	2023: Iman Cristal (Top 18)	
Mandaue City	2020	3	2020; 2022; 2024	1	2020: Lou Dominique Piczon (Top 16)	2020: Lou Dominique Piczon (Top 16)	
Mariveles, Bataan	2024	1	2024	0			
Naga City	2025	1	2025	0			The delegate in 2025 concurrently represented the Filipino Society of Virginia, U.S.
Naic, Cavite	2024	2	2024–2025	0			
Ozamiz City	2025	1	2025	0			
Pasay City	2020	3	2020; 2022; 2025	2	2025: Amanda Russo (Top 12)	2022: Celeste Cortesi (Winner)	The delegate in 2025 concurrently represented the Filipino Society of Pennsylvania, U.S.
Pasig City	2023	4	2020–2021; 2023–2025	2	2024: Selena Antonio-Reyes (Top 20)	2020: Rianna Pangindian (Top 16)	
Quezon City	2020	4	2020; 2023–2025	1	2020: Michelle Gumabao (2nd Runner-Up)	2023: Michelle Gumabao (2nd Runner-Up)	
Roxas City	2022	1	2022	0			
San Fernando, Cebu	2025	1	2025	0			
San Jose, Batangas	2025	1	2025	0			The delegate in 2025 concurrently represented the Filipino Society of Eastern Canada
San Juan City	2021	2	2021–2022	1	2021: Ayn Bernos (Top 16)	2021: Ayn Bernos (Top 16)	
San Pablo City	2024	1	2024	0			
Siargao Island	2021	3	2021; 2024–2025	0			
Siniloan, Laguna	2025	1	2025	1	2025: Yllana Aduana (2nd Runner-Up)	2025: Yllana Aduana (2nd Runner-Up)	
Tiaong, Quezon	2023	1	2023	1	2023: Afia Yeboah (Top 18)	2023: Afia Yeboah (Top 18)	
Victorias City	2022	1	2022	1			

== Unsuccessful attempts to participate ==
The list does not include withdrawals for personal reasons.

Year	Country/Territory	Contestant	Reason
2020	Aurora	Princess Marquez	Tested positive for COVID-19
2026	Batangas	Kathleen Caseñas	Delegate dethroned by local accredited partner
2022	Benguet	Shawntel Cruz	Dengue fever
2026	Benguet	Cristeta Longey	Resignation over transparency issues
2020	Cagayan de Oro City	Vincy Vacalares	Tested positive for COVID-19
2020	Capiz	Miriam Lara Hamid	Withdrew due to some issues with the province's accredited partner.
2021	Davao City	Ybonne Ortega	Tested positive for COVID-19
2024	Minglanilla, Cebu	Nica Zoza Nabua	Withdrew after the press presentation saying that the candidate will focus first on her studies and will compete at the next edition.
2020	Negros Occidental	Angela Aninang	Withdrew after the press presentation saying that the candidate will focus first on her studies.
2023	Pangasinan	Evangeline Fuentes	Withdrew due to health concerns.
2020	Sorsogon	Isabella Galeria	Tested positive for COVID-19
2021	Zambales	Joanna Rabe	Dengue fever

== Region group by number of wins ==
Island Group	Titles	Years
Metro Manila	2	2022; 2023
Luzon	3	2024; 2025; 2026
Visayas	2	2020; 2021
Mindanao	0	
