= Philippines at the Big Four beauty pageants =

Philippines at Miss Universe, Miss World, Miss International and Miss Earth

This is a list of the Philippines' representatives and their placements at the Big Four beauty pageants. The Philippines, widely considered a beauty pageant powerhouse, has won in all four pageants, with a total of 109 placements and 15 victories:

- Four – Miss Universe crowns (1969 • 1973 • 2015 • 2018)
- One – Miss World crown (2013)
- Six – Miss International crowns (1964 • 1970 • 1979 • 2005 • 2013 • 2016)
- Four – Miss Earth crowns (2008 • 2014 • 2015 • 2017)

Hundreds of beauty pageant competitions are held yearly, but the Big Four are considered the most prestigious, widely covered and broadcast by media. Various news agencies collectively refer to the four major pageants as "Big Four", namely—Miss Universe, Miss World, Miss International and Miss Earth.

== National organizations and franchises ==
The Philippine franchise holders of the four major beauty pageants are:

- Ariella Arida and Jonas Gaffud (Empire Philippines Holdings, Inc.) – Miss Universe Philippines.
- Arnold Vegafria (ALV Pageant Circle) – Miss World Philippines.
- Stella Araneta and Jorge L. Araneta (Binibining Pilipinas Charities Incorporated) – Binibining Pilipinas for Miss International Philippines.
- Ramon Monzon and Lorraine Schuck (Carousel Productions) – Miss Philippines Earth.

The criteria for the Big Four inclusion are based on specific standards such as the pageant's international prominence and prestige accepted by mainstream media; the quality and quantity of crowned delegates recognized by international franchisees; the winner's post pageant activities; the pageant's longevity, consistency, and history; the execution of the pageant's specific cause, platform, and advocacy; the overall pre-pageant activities, production quality and global telecast; the enormity of internet traffic; and the extent of popularity across the globe.

== History ==
Precolonial and indigenous Philippines already had established, well-defined ideals and standards of beauty. Most of the precolonial and native languages of the Philippines saw, experienced, and described beauty as natural—meaning, what is pleasing to the eyes and to the other senses, in nature, is considered beautiful. Precolonial Filipinos were recorded to describe what was the ideally beautiful person. For both men and women, precolonial Filipinos defined beauty with long, healthy, shiny black hair that was well-tended to and well-combed. Healthy skin, of good sunkissed complexion, was also a determinant of beauty. Excellent personal hygiene and observance of community sanitation, including bathing in the morning, before the day's activities, and bathing again in the evening, before retiring for sleep, was seen as a precursor to health and beauty. Bathing, too, was a necessity before and after sexual intercourse, and was heavily imposed socioculturally. Tattoos, especially in the Visayas, were also believed to elevate and accentuate one's beauty. A person's beauty, too, was not only limited to their physical appearance, but was also defined by their character, intellect, sense of community, altruism, and other values—which were greatly emphasized and required by indigenous Filipinos for one to be "truly beautiful". A darker sunkissed skin complexion than women's were seen on men as determinant of beauty. A harmonious and proportional distribution of well-developed muscles on the body, from working in the fields, hunting, or building, was also another determinant of beauty for precolonial Filipino men. For precolonial Filipino women, beauty of physique was determined by the overall harmony and symmetry of the body, healthy, sunkissed skin, long black hair, and how subdued they carried themselves. Elegance was seen as a paramount valuable trait, and was one of the precolonial Filipino woman's determinants of beauty beyond the physical. Men and women alike, in indigenous Philippines, adorned themselves with gold, jade, diamonds, rubies, and other precious stones believed to accentuate, emphasize, and elevate one's beauty.

The Philippines then inherited the practice and promotion of beauty pageants from the Kingdom of Spain and United States during its colonial history, and reflected their keen interest in pageantry through the Santero culture.

The first officially recorded beauty pageant competition in the Philippines was held in 1908 during the Manila Carnival, which organized both American and Philippine diplomatic relations, with the aim to exhibit achievements in commerce and agriculture. The winner of the competition was crowned, and came to be known, as the “Carnival Queen.” The competitions were held annually from 1908 to 1938.

In 1926, the Manila Carnival conceptualized and held the first national beauty pageant using the title Miss Philippines to represent the Philippine islands; contestants came from all over the country with the following regional titles: Miss Luzon, Miss Visayas, and Miss Mindanao. This new competition gained greater popularity, resulting in the phasing out of the “Carnival Queen” title in 1938.

== National pageants ==
The following are national pageants which serve as qualifiers for the Big Four pageants.

=== Miss Universe Philippines ===
The Philippine representatives to the Miss Universe pageant from 1964 to 2019 were chosen by Binibining Pilipinas. Starting 2020, a separate organization has been choosing the Philippine representatives to the Miss Universe competition: the new Miss Universe Philippines Organization, with Ariella Arida as national director.

=== Binibining Pilipinas ===
In 1964, Binibining Pilipinas Charities Incorporated, (BPCI) headed by Stella Araneta became the official national franchise holder of the Miss Universe Organization in the Philippines, and had sent representatives to the Miss Universe pageant from 1964 to 2019. Its predecessor, the “Miss Philippines”, had been the official franchise holder from 1952 to 1963.

In 1968, the same organization acquired the Philippine franchise of Miss International, and conducted a separate pageant called "Miss Philippines" to select a representative for the Miss International competition. In 1969, BPCI started to combine the Binibining Pilipinas and Miss Philippines competitions and awarded the title "Binibining Pilipinas" to the country's representative to the Miss Universe competition, while granting the "Miss Philippines" title to the representative for the Miss International competition. For the first time in 1973, both titles "Binibining Pilipinas Universe" and "Binibining Pilipinas International" were awarded to the winners in a single competition.

=== Miss World Philippines ===
The Philippine representatives to the Miss World pageant from 1966 to 1968 were chosen by various pageant organizers. From 1969 to 1976, the title was awarded through the Miss Republic of the Philippines, then by Mutya ng Pilipinas, Inc. through Mutya ng Pilipinas pageant from 1977 to 1991, and Binibining Pilipinas Charities, Inc., through the Binibining Pilipinas pageant from 1992 to 2010. In 2011, the Miss World Philippines organization was held by Cory Quirino's CQ Global Quest until 2016. From 2017 onwards, the Miss World Philippines has been under the management of Arnold Vegafria's ALV Talent Circuit.

=== Miss Philippines Earth ===
The Miss Philippines Earth was founded in 2001 by Carousel Productions headed by its President Ramon Monzon, who is also the president, CEO, and director of the Philippine Stock Exchange and chairman of the PSE Foundation, Inc. It is spearheaded by Ramon's wife Lorraine Schuck as executive vice president, with Peachy Veneracion as the vice president and project director.

Carousel Productions established Miss Philippines Earth as a beauty pageant competition with the aim of actively promoting the protection and preservation of the environment. Consequently, Miss Philippines (currently called Miss Philippines Earth; not related to the defunct “Miss Philippines” of 1926) was created.

== Participation in international pageant competitions ==
From Venus Raj's participation at Miss Universe 2010 (marking the Philippines' first semifinal placement at the pageant in the 21st century and since Miriam Quiambao placed second to Botswana at Miss Universe 1999) to Beatrice Gomez's stint at Miss Universe 2021, the country placed in the Miss Universe semifinals each year, scoring 2 Top 10 placements in 2014 and 2017, 2 Top 5/6 placements in 2016 and 2021, 4 consecutive runner-up finishes in the Top 5 from 2010 to 2013, and 2 crowns in 2015 and 2018. As a result, the Philippines is the country from the Eastern Hemisphere with the longest overall streak of Miss Universe semifinal appearances (and third overall by any country in the world), totaling 12 consecutive years. It is also the first country in the world to place non-stop at Miss Universe semifinals for at least a full decade beginning any year of the 21st century.

The Philippines won multiple Big Four pageant crowns in the same year twice – in 2013 with Bea Santiago (Miss International) and Megan Young (Miss World), and in 2015 with Angelia Ong (Miss Earth) and Pia Wurtzbach (Miss Universe), making it the most recent country as of 2026 to win multiple Big Four pageant crowns in the same year.

From 2010 to 2019, the Philippines has only unplaced twice in each of the Miss World, Miss International and Miss Earth competitions, and has won an additional 6 crowns from these pageants alone, making it the country with the single most successful decade in terms of Big Four beauty pageant results in the world. Since 2010, the Philippines recived media attention for its pageant training mechanisms.

=== World's longest winning streak—2013 to 2018 ===
The Philippines currently holds the world's longest winning streak in the Big Four pageants by any country in history, from 2013 to 2018. The country's winning streak started in 2013 with Megan Young as the country's first ever, and currently only, Miss World titleholder, and also with Bea Santiago winning the Miss International crown. Jamie Herrell then won the Miss Earth 2014 crown. Angelia Ong garnered for the Philippines the first, and so far only, back-to-back victory in Miss Earth history by clinching the 2015 crown. In the same year, Pia Wurtzbach won the Miss Universe 2015 crown for the Philippines.

The streak continued in 2016 when Kylie Verzosa clinched the Philippines its sixth, and most recent, Miss International crown. The following year in 2017, Karen Ibasco won for the country its fourth, and most recent, Miss Earth crown – the most by any country in the pageant's history. Culminating this six-year winning streak is Catriona Gray's victory at Miss Universe 2018, claiming the Philippines' fourth, and most recent, Miss Universe crown. The Philippines is, to date, the country with the longest winning streak in history, and the only country in the world to win all of the Big Four pageants in any of their titles streak.

== Summary ==
The following table details the placements of the Philippines' representatives in the Big Four pageants.

Color Key

- Winner
- Runner-up; Elemental title for Miss Earth
- Finalist, semifinalist, or quarter finalist; Runner-up for Miss Earth

Year	Miss Universe	Miss World	Miss International	Miss Earth
2027	TBD	TBD	Gwendoline Soriano; TBD	TBD
2026	Bea Millan-Windorski; TBD	Asia Rose Simpson; Top 12	Katrina Johnson; TBD	Rina Andrea delos Santos; TBD
2025	Ahtisa Manalo; 3rd Runner-Up	Krishnah Gravidez; Top 8	Myrna Esguerra; 4th Runner-Up	Joy Barcoma; Runner-Up
2024	Chelsea Manalo; Top 30	No pageant held	Angelica Lopez	Irha Mel Alfeche; Top 12
2023	Michelle Dee; Top 10	Gwendolyne Fourniol	Nicole Borromeo; 3rd Runner-Up	Yllana Aduana; Miss Earth – Air
2022	Celeste Cortesi	No pageant held	Hannah Arnold; Top 15	Jenny Ramp; Top 20
2021	Beatrice Gomez; Top 5	Tracy Perez; Top 13	No pageant held due to the COVID-19 pandemic	Naelah Alshorbaji; Top 8
2020	Rabiya Mateo; Top 21	No pageant held due to COVID-19 pandemic		Roxie Baeyens; Miss Earth – Water
2019	Gazini Ganados; Top 20	Michelle Dee; Top 12	Bea Magtanong; Top 8	Janelle Tee; Top 20
2018	Catriona Gray; Miss Universe	Katarina Rodriguez	Ahtisa Manalo; 1st Runner-Up	Celeste Cortesi; Top 8
2017	Rachel Peters; Top 10	Laura Lehmann; Top 40	Mariel de Leon	Karen Ibasco; Miss Earth
2016	Maxine Medina; Top 6	Catriona Gray; Top 5	Kylie Verzosa; Miss International	Imelda Schweighart
2015	Pia Wurtzbach; Miss Universe	Hillarie Parungao; Top 10	Janicel Lubina; Top 10	Angelia Ong; Miss Earth
2014	Mary Jean Lastimosa; Top 10	Valerie Weigmann; Top 25	Bianca Guidotti	Jamie Herrell; Miss Earth
2013	Ariella Arida; 3rd Runner-Up	Megan Young; Miss World	Bea Santiago; Miss International	Angelee delos Reyes; Top 8
2012	Janine Tugonon; 1st Runner-Up	Queenierich Rehman; Top 15	Nicole Schmitz; Top 15	Stephany Stefanowitz; Miss Earth – Air
2011	Shamcey Supsup; 3rd Runner-Up	Gwendoline Ruais; 1st Runner-Up	Dianne Necio; Top 15	Athena Imperial; Miss Earth – Water
2010	Venus Raj; 4th Runner-Up	Czarina Gatbonton	Krista Kleiner; Top 15	Psyche Resus
2009	Bianca Manalo	Marie-Ann Umali	Melody Gersbach; Top 15	Sandra Seifert; Miss Earth – Air
2008	Jennifer Barrientos	Danielle Castaño	Patricia Fernandez; Top 12	Karla Henry; Miss Earth
2007	Theresa Licaros	Maggie Wilson	Nadia Shami	Jeanne Harn
2006	Lia Ramos	Anna Igpit	Denille Valmonte	Cathy Untalan; Miss Earth – Water
2005	Gionna Cabrera	Carlene Aguilar; Top 15	Lara Quigaman; Miss International	Genebelle Raagas; Top 16
2004	Maricar Balagtas	Karla Bautista; Top 5	Margaret Bayot; Top 15	Tamera Szijarto; Top 8
2003	Carla Balingit	Mafae Yunon; Top 5	Jhezarie Javier	Laura Dunlap; Top 10
2002	Karen Agustin	Katherine Manalo; Top 10	Kristine Alzar	April Ross Perez; Top 10
2001	Zorayda Andam	Gilrhea Quinzon	Maricarl Tolosa	Carlene Aguilar; Top 10
2000	Nina Alagao	Katherine de Guzman	Joanna Peñaloza	↑ No pageant held (Established in 2001 in Manila, Philippines)
1999	Miriam Quiambao; 1st Runner-Up	Lalaine Edson	Georgina Sandico	↑ No pageant held (Established in 2001 in Manila, Philippines)
1998	Jewel Lobaton	Rachel Soriano	Colette Glazer; Top 15	↑ No pageant held (Established in 2001 in Manila, Philippines)
1997	Abbygale Arenas	Kristine Florendo	Susan Ritter; Top 15	↑ No pageant held (Established in 2001 in Manila, Philippines)
1996	Aileen Damiles	Daisy Reyes	Yedda Kittilstvedt; Top 15	↑ No pageant held (Established in 2001 in Manila, Philippines)
1995	Joanne Santos	Reham Tago	Gladys Dueñas; Top 15	↑ No pageant held (Established in 2001 in Manila, Philippines)
1994	Charlene Gonzales; Top 6	Caroline Subijano; Top 10	Alma Concepcion; Top 15	↑ No pageant held (Established in 2001 in Manila, Philippines)
1993	Dindi Gallardo	Ruffa Gutierrez; 2nd Runner-Up	Sheela Santarin	↑ No pageant held (Established in 2001 in Manila, Philippines)
1992	Elizabeth Berroya	Marina Benipayo	Jo-Anne Alivio	↑ No pageant held (Established in 2001 in Manila, Philippines)
1991	Lourdes Gonzalez	Gemith Gemparo	Patricia Betita; Top 15	↑ No pageant held (Established in 2001 in Manila, Philippines)
1990	Germelina Padilla	Antonette Ballesteros	Jennifer Pingree	↑ No pageant held (Established in 2001 in Manila, Philippines)
1989	Sara Paez	Estrella Querubin	Lilia Andanar	↑ No pageant held (Established in 2001 in Manila, Philippines)
1988	Perfida Limpin	Dana Narvadez	Anthea Robles	↑ No pageant held (Established in 2001 in Manila, Philippines)
1987	Geraldine Asis; Top 10	Lourdes Apostol	Lourdes Enriquez	↑ No pageant held (Established in 2001 in Manila, Philippines)
1986	Violeta Naluz	Sherry Byrne; Top 15	Alice Dixson; Top 15	↑ No pageant held (Established in 2001 in Manila, Philippines)
1985	Joyce Burton	Elizabeth Cuenco	Sabrina Artadi	↑ No pageant held (Established in 2001 in Manila, Philippines)
1984	Desiree Verdadero; 3rd Runner-Up	Aurora Sevilla	Bella Nachor	↑ No pageant held (Established in 2001 in Manila, Philippines)
1983	Rosita Capuyon	Marilou Sadiua	Flor Pastrana	↑ No pageant held (Established in 2001 in Manila, Philippines)
1982	Maria Isabel Lopez	Sarah Areza; Top 15	Adela Manibog	↑ No pageant held (Established in 2001 in Manila, Philippines)
1981	Caroline Mendoza	Suzette Nicolas	Alice Sacasas; Top 15	↑ No pageant held (Established in 2001 in Manila, Philippines)
1980	Rosario Silayan; 3rd Runner-Up	Milagros Nabor	Diana Chiong	↑ No pageant held (Established in 2001 in Manila, Philippines)
1979	Criselda Cecilio	Josefina Francisco	Melanie Marquez; Miss International	↑ No pageant held (Established in 2001 in Manila, Philippines)
1978	Jennifer Cortez	Louvette Hammond	Luz Policarpio	↑ No pageant held (Established in 2001 in Manila, Philippines)
1977	Anna Kier	Melissa Veneracion; Did not compete	Cristina Alberto; Did not compete	↑ No pageant held (Established in 2001 in Manila, Philippines)
1976	Elizabeth de Padua	Josephine Conde; Did not compete	Dolores Ascalon; Top 15	↑ No pageant held (Established in 2001 in Manila, Philippines)
1975	Rose Marie Brosas; 4th Runner-Up	Suzanne Gonzales	Jaye Murphy; Top 15	↑ No pageant held (Established in 2001 in Manila, Philippines)
1974	Guadalupe Sanchez; Top 12	Agnes Rustia	Erlynne Bernardez	↑ No pageant held (Established in 2001 in Manila, Philippines)
1973	Margie Moran; Miss Universe	Evangeline Pascual; 1st Runner-Up	Elena Ojeda; 4th Runner-Up	↑ No pageant held (Established in 2001 in Manila, Philippines)
1972	Barbara Crespo; Top 12	Evangeline Reyes; Top 15	Yolanda Dominguez; 2nd Runner-Up	↑ No pageant held (Established in 2001 in Manila, Philippines)
1971	Vida Doria	Onelia Jose	Evelyn Camus; 2nd Runner-Up	↑ No pageant held (Established in 2001 in Manila, Philippines)
1970	Simonette delos Reyes	Minerva Cagatao; Top 15	Aurora Pijuan; Miss International	↑ No pageant held (Established in 2001 in Manila, Philippines)
1969	Gloria Diaz; Miss Universe	Feliza Miro	Margaret Montinola; Top 15	↑ No pageant held (Established in 2001 in Manila, Philippines)
1968	Rosario Zaragoza	Cecilia Amabuyok; 4th Runner-Up	Nenita Ramos; Top 15	↑ No pageant held (Established in 2001 in Manila, Philippines)
1967	Pilar Pilapil	Maita Gomez	Margarita Romualdez	↑ No pageant held (Established in 2001 in Manila, Philippines)
1966	Clarinda Soriano; Top 15	Vivien Austria	No pageant held	↑ No pageant held (Established in 2001 in Manila, Philippines)
1965	Louise Vail; Top 15	↑ No pageant held (Established in 1951 in England, United Kingdom. The Philippines sent their first delegate in 1966)	Isabelle Santos	↑ No pageant held (Established in 2001 in Manila, Philippines)
1964	Myrna Panlilio	↑ No pageant held (Established in 1951 in England, United Kingdom. The Philippines sent their first delegate in 1966)	Gemma Cruz; Miss International	↑ No pageant held (Established in 2001 in Manila, Philippines)
1963	Lalaine Bennett; 3rd Runner-Up	↑ No pageant held (Established in 1951 in England, United Kingdom. The Philippines sent their first delegate in 1966)	Monina Yllana; Top 15	↑ No pageant held (Established in 2001 in Manila, Philippines)
1962	Josephine Brown	↑ No pageant held (Established in 1951 in England, United Kingdom. The Philippines sent their first delegate in 1966)	Cynthia Ugalde	↑ No pageant held (Established in 2001 in Manila, Philippines)
1961	No representative sent	↑ No pageant held (Established in 1951 in England, United Kingdom. The Philippines sent their first delegate in 1966)	Pilar Arciaga	↑ No pageant held (Established in 2001 in Manila, Philippines)
1960	No representative sent	↑ No pageant held (Established in 1951 in England, United Kingdom. The Philippines sent their first delegate in 1966)	Edita Vital; Top 15	↑ No pageant held (Established in 2001 in Manila, Philippines)
1959	Cristina Matias; Did not compete	↑ No pageant held (Established in 1951 in England, United Kingdom. The Philippines sent their first delegate in 1966)	↑ No pageant held (Established in 1960 in California, United States and then it was transferred in 1968 in Tokyo, Japan)	↑ No pageant held (Established in 2001 in Manila, Philippines)
1958	Carmen Tuason; Did not compete	↑ No pageant held (Established in 1951 in England, United Kingdom. The Philippines sent their first delegate in 1966)	↑ No pageant held (Established in 1960 in California, United States and then it was transferred in 1968 in Tokyo, Japan)	↑ No pageant held (Established in 2001 in Manila, Philippines)
1957	Carmen Corrales	↑ No pageant held (Established in 1951 in England, United Kingdom. The Philippines sent their first delegate in 1966)	↑ No pageant held (Established in 1960 in California, United States and then it was transferred in 1968 in Tokyo, Japan)	↑ No pageant held (Established in 2001 in Manila, Philippines)
1956	Isabel Rodriguez	↑ No pageant held (Established in 1951 in England, United Kingdom. The Philippines sent their first delegate in 1966)	↑ No pageant held (Established in 1960 in California, United States and then it was transferred in 1968 in Tokyo, Japan)	↑ No pageant held (Established in 2001 in Manila, Philippines)
1955	Yvonne delos Reyes	↑ No pageant held (Established in 1951 in England, United Kingdom. The Philippines sent their first delegate in 1966)	↑ No pageant held (Established in 1960 in California, United States and then it was transferred in 1968 in Tokyo, Japan)	↑ No pageant held (Established in 2001 in Manila, Philippines)
1954	Blesilda Ocampo; Top 16	↑ No pageant held (Established in 1951 in England, United Kingdom. The Philippines sent their first delegate in 1966)	↑ No pageant held (Established in 1960 in California, United States and then it was transferred in 1968 in Tokyo, Japan)	↑ No pageant held (Established in 2001 in Manila, Philippines)
1953	Cristina Pacheco	↑ No pageant held (Established in 1951 in England, United Kingdom. The Philippines sent their first delegate in 1966)	↑ No pageant held (Established in 1960 in California, United States and then it was transferred in 1968 in Tokyo, Japan)	↑ No pageant held (Established in 2001 in Manila, Philippines)
1952	Teresita Sanchez	↑ No pageant held (Established in 1951 in England, United Kingdom. The Philippines sent their first delegate in 1966)	↑ No pageant held (Established in 1960 in California, United States and then it was transferred in 1968 in Tokyo, Japan)	↑ No pageant held (Established in 2001 in Manila, Philippines)
1951	↑ No pageant held (Established in 1952 in California, United States and then it was transferred in 1960 in Florida, United States)	↑ No pageant held (Established in 1951 in England, United Kingdom. The Philippines sent their first delegate in 1966)	↑ No pageant held (Established in 1960 in California, United States and then it was transferred in 1968 in Tokyo, Japan)	↑ No pageant held (Established in 2001 in Manila, Philippines)

=== Placements ===
Pageant	Placements	Best result
Miss Universe	29	Winner (1969 • 1973 • 2015 • 2018)
Miss World	23	Winner (2013)
Miss International	35	Winner (1964 • 1970 • 1979 • 2005 • 2013 • 2016)
Miss Earth	22	Winner (2008 • 2014 • 2015 • 2017)
Total	109	15 Titles

== Hosting ==
The Philippines first hosted its major international pageant in 1974 for Miss Universe. It has also hosted Miss Earth several times, as the pageant originated in the country.

Year/s of hosting	Pageant
1974, 1994, 2016	Miss Universe
2001–2009, 2011–2014, 2016–2019, 2022, 2024–2025	Miss Earth

== List of crossovers ==
Crossover winners of a national pageant wins in another major national pageant and then participate in the line of international beauty pageants.

- Carlene Aguilar is the first crossover candidate to accomplish this feat. Aguilar initially won Miss Philippines Earth 2001 and later won the title Binibining Pilipinas World in Binibining Pilipinas 2005. She became the first Filipina to win two major national crowns in Philippine pageantry. She placed in the Top 10 in the Miss Earth 2001 and in the Top 15 in the Miss World 2005 pageant.
- Catriona Gray became the second crossover candidate who initially won Miss World Philippines 2016 and later Miss Universe Philippines 2018. Gray competed internationally and finished in the Top 5 at the Miss World 2016 competition held in Washington, D.C., and eventually won as the Miss Universe 2018 in Thailand.
- Celeste Cortesi became the third crossover candidate, winning Miss Earth Philippines 2018 and later Miss Universe Philippines 2022. She competed at Miss Earth 2018, where she finished in the Top 8, and later competed at Miss Universe 2022, but failed to advance to the Top 16 semifinals.
- Michelle Dee became the fourth crossover candidate, winning Miss World Philippines 2019 and later Miss Universe Philippines 2023. She competed at Miss World 2019, where she finished in the Top 12, and later placed in the Top 10 at Miss Universe 2023 in El Salvador.
- Ahtisa Manalo became the fifth crossover candidate, winning Binibining Pilipinas International 2018 and later Miss Universe Philippines 2025. She competed at Miss International 2018, where she finished as first runner-up, and later placed as third runner-up at Miss Universe 2025 in Thailand.
- Bea Millan-Windorski became the first crossover candidate to have represented two countries in the process. She won Miss Earth USA 2024 and later Miss Universe Philippines 2026. She represented the United States in Miss Earth 2024, winning a Miss Earth – Water elemental title and will go on to represent the Philippines in Miss Universe 2026.
