= Miss Universe Philippines 2024 =

Beauty pageant edition

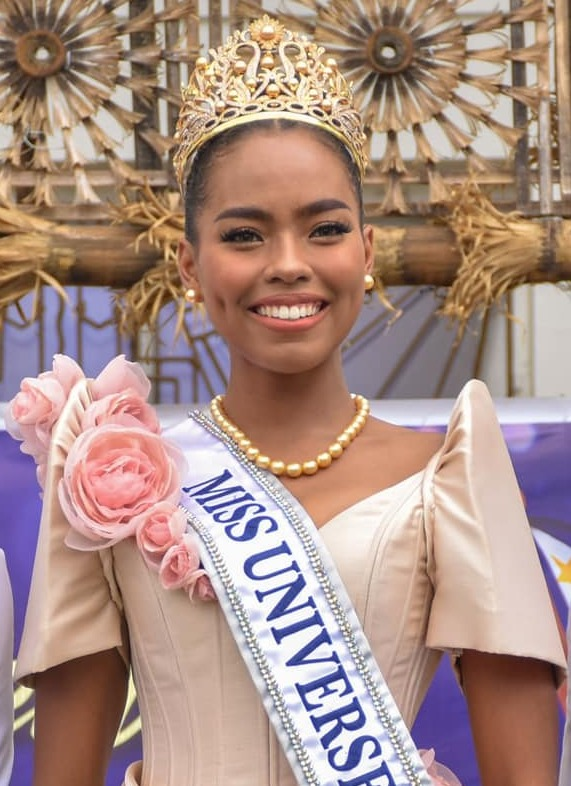
- Chelsea Manalo
- Date: May 22, 2024
- Presenters: Alden Richards; Jeannie Mai; R'Bonney Gabriel; Gabbi Garcia; Tim Yap
- Entertainment: Marina Summers; Lola Amour; Win Metawin
- Theme: Love For All
- Venue: SM Mall of Asia Arena, Pasay
- Entrants: 53
- Placements: 20
- Withdrawals: Angeles City; Kananga, Leyte; Washington, U.S.
- Winner: Chelsea Manalo; Bulacan
- Best National Costume: Alexie Brooks; Iloilo City; Janet Hammond; Southern California; Tamara Ocier; Tacloban

External videos
- The coronation - full show with gaps
- The coronation night (full show no gaps)

Miss Universe Philippines 2024 was the fifth edition of the Miss Universe Philippines pageant, held at the SM Mall of Asia Arena in Pasay, on May 22, 2024. It was the first where competitors were chosen through local pageants organized by Miss Universe Philippines Accredited Partners.

Chelsea Manalo of Bulacan won the competition, succeeding Michelle Dee of Makati. Manalo represented the Philippines at the Miss Universe 2024 pageant in Mexico, where she reached the top 30 and became the first Miss Universe Asia. She is the first Black woman to be selected to represent the country in Miss Universe.

The contest was presented by Miss Universe 2022 R'Bonney Gabriel, Alden Richards, Jeannie Mai, Gabbi Garcia and Tim Yap. Lola Amour, Marina Summers, and Win Metawin performed in the event.

== Background ==
=== Selection of participants ===
On April 11, 2023, the Miss Universe Philippines Organization announced the launch of a new accredited partners program that would select delegates from the 2024 edition onwards. This allows accredited partners to organize local pageants that will send competitors to the national pageant. This replaced the previous system, where applicants underwent a screening process before being confirmed as a candidate for the title. The national director Shamcey Supsup-Lee, explained that this intended to "even the playing field" by having local organizers providing resources to participants in the pageant. It was compared to that used in Miss USA. Supsup-Lee added that it will "provide women in the provinces with an equal opportunity", noting that previously contestants based in Metro Manila had a financial advantage.

As the Miss Universe Organization removed the age limit from Miss Universe 2024 onwards, allowing competitors aged 29 and above to compete, while keeping the minimum age to 18. In light of the change, media outlets cited Jocelyn Cubales, who competed in Miss Universe Philippines – Quezon City at the age of 69, as the first senior citizen to compete in local pageants affiliated with the national pageant.

The edition marks the first time in which delegates representing Overseas Filipino Communities will be sent to the pageant. Media outlets including The Philippine Star and the Manila Standard have also noted the presence of "pageant veterans" in the edition, citing the participation of Ahtisa Manalo of Quezon, who competed in Miss International 2018; Christi McGarry of Taguig, who competed in Miss Intercontinental 2015; Kris Tiffany Janson of Cebu, who competed in Miss Intercontinental 2014; and Cyrille Payumo of Pampanga, who was crowned as Miss Tourism International 2019.

==== Withdrawals and replacements ====
Out of the 55 initial contestants announced, four announced their withdrawal from the competition prior to the coronation night: Natasha Jung of Kananga on February 22, 2024; Joanne Marie Thornley of Angeles on March 19; Lorraine Ojimba of Quezon City on April 3; and Kiara Landon of the Filipino community of Washington, United States, on April 19.

Two of the four franchises with withdrawn delegates sent replacement candidates to the pageant: Kananga announced Phoebe Torita as its new delegate on February 28, while Quezon City announced Cam Lagmay as its new delegate on April 7. Angeles and Washington did not send new delegates, ultimately withdrawing from the competition.

=== Location and date ===
SM Mall of Asia Arena (pictured in 2015), the venue for the pageant

On April 2, 2024, the organization announced that the coronation night will be held on May 22, at the SM Mall of Asia Arena in Bay City, Pasay. The sale of tickets for the event began on April 8. The pageant and its related events are being held with the theme "Love For All". The initial fifty-five competitors were formally introduced at a press presentation on February 18, at the Hilton Manila. This was held concurrently with the appointment ceremonies for the Miss Philippines and Mister Pilipinas Worldwide pageants.

=== Additional titles ===
On May 13, 2024, the organization announced that four more national titles would be contested in the pageant. In a separate ceremony following the coronation night, delegates were appointed to represent the country in Miss Supranational, Miss Charm, Miss Eco International, and Miss Cosmo.

== Results ==
=== Placements ===
Map of the participating localities and the placements of their respective delegates..

Placement	Contestant
Miss Universe Philippines 2024	Bulacan – Chelsea Manalo
1st Runner-Up	Cainta – Stacey Gabriel
2nd Runner-Up	Quezon – Ahtisa Manalo
3rd Runner-Up	Baguio – Tarah Valencia
4th Runner-Up	Taguig – Christi McGarry
Top 10	Bacoor – Victoria Velasquez Vincent; Cebu – Kris Tiffany Janson; Iloilo City – Alexie Brooks; Pampanga – Cyrille Payumo; Zambales – Anita Gomez
Top 20	Australia – Kymberlee Street; Hawaii – Bianca Tapia ‡; Laguna – Alexandra Rosales; Leyte – Angel Tambal ‡; Northern California – Kayla Carter; Nueva Ecija – Maica Martinez ‡; Palawan – Raven Doctor; Pasig – Selena Antonio-Reyes; Tacloban – Tamara Ocier ‡; United Kingdom – Christina Chalk

‡ – Challenge winners

=== Appointments ===
Shortly after the coronation night, the top 10 delegates shortlisted from the top 20 semifinalists were given the choice to represent the country in four international beauty pageants. As first runner-up, Stacey Gabriel of Cainta had the first choice, but declined any of the titles. Ahtisa Manalo of Quezon then had the first choice as second runner-up and chose to be crowned Miss Cosmo Philippines.

On July 6, 2024, Kayla Jean Carter of Northern California was appointed to represent the country at the Miss Charm 2024 pageant, after Krishnah Gravidez, the original titleholder, resigned to compete in Miss World Philippines 2024.

Title	Contestant	International Placement	Ref.
The Miss Philippines Supranational 2025	Baguio – Tarah Valencia	3rd Runner-Up – Miss Supranational 2025	
The Miss Philippines Charm 2025	Pampanga – Cyrille Payumo	Top 20 – Miss Charm 2025	
The Miss Philippines Eco International 2025	Iloilo City – Alexie Mae Brooks	Winner – Miss Eco International 2025	
The Miss Philippines Cosmo 2024	Quezon – Ahtisa Manalo	Top 10 – Miss Cosmo 2024	
The Miss Philippines Charm 2024	Northern California – Kayla Jean Carter	Top 20 – Miss Charm 2024	
The Miss Philippines Eco Teen 2024	Palawan – Raven Doctor	3rd Runner-Up – Miss Eco Teen International 2024	

=== Special awards ===
==== Major awards ====
Award	Contestant
Best National Costume	Iloilo City – Alexie Brooks; Southern California – Janet Hammond; Tacloban – Tamara Ocier

==== Sponsor awards ====
Award	Contestant
Face of Avon	Iloilo City – Alexie Brooks
Miss Buscopan	Iloilo City – Alexie Brooks
Miss JellLife	Iloilo City – Alexie Brooks
Hello Glow Body	Bacoor – Victoria Velasquez Vincent
Miss Kemans	Bacoor – Victoria Velasquez Vincent
Icon Doll	Cebu – Kris Tiffany Janson
Miss Aqua Boracay	Quezon – Ahtisa Manalo
Miss Danielito's	Quezon – Ahtisa Manalo
Miss Fairy Skin	Quezon – Ahtisa Manalo
Miss Hello Glow	Quezon – Ahtisa Manalo
Miss iColorPlus	Quezon – Ahtisa Manalo
Miss Smilee	Quezon – Ahtisa Manalo
Queen of Hearts	Quezon – Ahtisa Manalo
Miss Cream Silk	Cavite – Dia Mate
Miss Jewelmer	Taguig – Christi McGarry
Miss So-En	Taguig – Christi McGarry
Miss Wuling	Taguig – Christi McGarry
Miss Jojo Bragais	Bulacan – Chelsea Manalo
Miss Mags	Baguio – Tarah Valencia
Miss Villa Medica	Baguio – Tarah Valencia
Miss Zonrox	Bacoor – Victoria Velasquez Vincent; Iloilo City – Alexie Brooks; Quezon – Ahtisa Manalo

== Pre-pageant events ==
=== National Costume Competition ===
With the theme Flora and Fauna, the National Costume Competition was held on April 28, 2024, at the Sultan Kudarat Provincial Capitol Gym in Sultan Kudarat. R'Bonney Gabriel and Marco Gumabao hosted the event. The results of the competition were announced on April 29. Alexie Brooks of Iloilo City, Janet Hammond of Southern California, and Tamara Ocier of Tacloban, were named winners, each receiving a ₱100,000 cash prize.

The contest was held following the runway challenge held on April 26 and the Inaul Fashion Show, held on April 27, which showcased the creations of 15 local designers based on the indigenous inaul cloth.

=== Challenges ===
In the run-up to the competition, the fifty-three contestants competed in preliminary contests for a guaranteed spot in the semifinals. The results for each challenge were determined through online polls. The swimsuit competition, the first of the preliminary contests for the pageant, was held on April 20, in Boracay at the Aqua Boracay resort. Also determined during the contest were eight "Acqua Boracay Angels" and twelve brand ambassadors for Arete Tagaytay. The five finalists for the contest were announced on May 4. The individual reels of the contestants were released on April 27, which saw the public vote for the winner on Facebook. The third competition, the "Up Close & Personal" personality interviews, followed on May 7, with executive vice president Voltaire Tayag serving as the sole panelist. On May 8, voting opened for the runway challenge, the third contest.

Challenges	Results	
Challenges	Challenge winner	Top 5 finalists
Bingo Plus fan vote	Nueva Ecija – Maica Martinez	—N/a
Swimsuit challenge	Hawaii – Patricia Bianca Tapia	Cavite – Dia Mate; Hawaii – Patricia Bianca Tapia; Iloilo City – Alexie Brooks; Quezon – Ahtisa Manalo; Southern California – Janet Hammond
Casting reel challenge	Tacloban – Tamara Ocier	—N/a
Interview challenge	Iloilo City – Alexie Brooks	Hawaii – Patricia Bianca Tapia; Iloilo City – Alexie Brooks; Quezon – Ahtisa Manalo; Quirino – Stephanie Faye Gerona; Taguig – Christi McGarry
Runway challenge	Leyte – Angel Rose Tambal	Florida – Matea Mahal Smith; Iloilo City – Alexie Brooks; Leyte – Angel Rose Tambal; Quezon – Ahtisa Manalo; Quirino – Stephanie Faye Gerona

== Pageant ==
=== Format ===
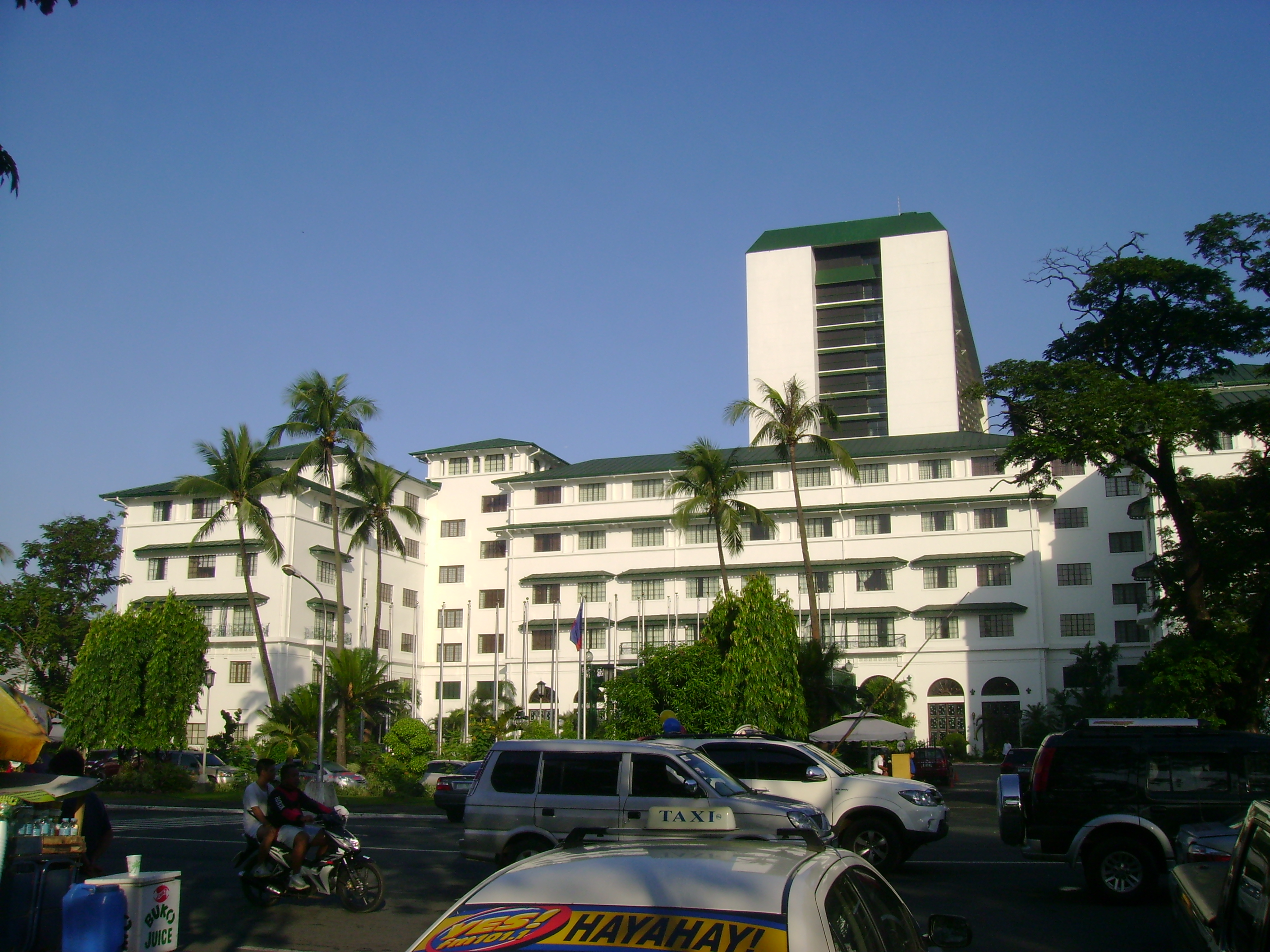
The preliminary competition was held at the Manila Hotel (pictured in 2012).

The results of the preliminary competition, held on May 19, 2024, at the Manila Hotel, which evaluated the 53 delegates in the swimsuit and evening gown categories and the closed-door interviews, determined the first 15 semifinalists for the edition. The voting public determined the winners of the pre-pageant challenges which each advanced a delegate to the semifinals, creating a total of 20 semifinalists, an increase of two from the previous edition. The semifinalists competed in the swimsuit competition, where they were then narrowed down to ten. Afterward, top 10 competed in the evening gown competition, where five delegates were chosen to advance to the finals. The top five finalists then participated in the question and answer portion where Miss Universe Philippines 2024 and her runners-up were determined.

=== Selection committee ===
The panel of judges for the pageant consisted of:

- Ariella Arida – Miss Universe Philippines 2013
- Archie Carrasco – chairman and CEO of AGC Power Holdings Corp.
- Camille Co – chief operating officer of Aqua Boracay
- Jason Co – chief financial officer of Miss Universe Skincare
- Beatrice Gomez – Miss Universe Philippines 2021
- Crystal Jacinto – chief executive officer of Conti's
- Joy Marcelo – vice president of Sparkle GMA Artist Center
- Stanley Ng – president and chief operating officer of Philippine Airlines
- Eusebio Tanco – chairman of DiGi Plus Interactive Corp.
- Vina Yapjuangco – chief executive officer of Kemans

In addition to the ten judges, the public voted in real-time as the eleventh judge in each stage of the coronation night.

=== Broadcast ===
The pageant was broadcast online through the YouTube channel of EmpirePH. Miss Universe 2022 R'Bonney Gabriel, Alden Richards, Jeannie Mai, Gabbi Garcia, and Tim Yap presented the program. Meanwhile Lola Amour, Marina Summers, and Win Metawin performed in select segments of the event.

==== Issues ====
The delayed telecast of the preliminary interviews and the preliminary gala night, originally set to be aired on May 20, at 12:00 p.m. and 6:00pm (PhST), respectively, on the EmpirePH YouTube channel, was subject to delays and glitches and was eventually made private. Attracting backlash from netizens, the organizers released a public apology and re-uploaded the video of the telecast. The coronation night, which ran for nearly six hours, was criticized on social media for its length. The organization explained that the length was a result of allotting "enough time" for the "tabulations, production set-ups, and costume changes" during the event. As a result, a shortened version of the pageant was uploaded on the organization's YouTube channel.

== Contestants ==
Fifty-three contestants competed for the title.

Locality	Contestant	Age (Note: Ages at the time of the competition)	Hometown	Notes
Albay	Elaine Bernales	23	Daraga	
Australia	Kymberlee Street	26	Sydney	Later Miss Global Australia 2026
Bacolod	Yvonne Catamco	23	Bacolod	
Bacoor	Victoria Vincent	28	Bacoor	Crowned as Miss Universe New Zealand 2024; Completed at Miss Universe 2024
Baguio	Tarah Valencia	23	Baguio	Appointed Miss Supranational Philippines 2025; 3rd runner-up at Miss Supranational 2025
Bantayan Island	Juvel Ducay	29	Bantayan	
Batangas	Mariztella Lat	23	Batangas City	
Bohol	Bianca Gaviola	24	Tagbilaran	
Bukidnon	Natasha Bajuyo	22	Valencia	
Bulacan	Chelsea Manalo	24	Meycauayan	Top 15 at Miss World Philippines 2017; Crowned as Miss Universe Asia 2024
Cabanatuan	Daniella Villar	25	Cabanatuan	
Cagayan de Oro	Lynn Lomongo	18	Cagayan de Oro	
Cainta	Stacey Gabriel	26	Cainta	2nd runner-up at Binibining Pilipinas 2022
Camiguin	Rethiana Rosy	23	Mambajao	
Cavite	Dia Maté	22	Kawit	Later Crowned Reina Hispanoamericana 2025
Cebu	Kris Janson	34	Cebu City	2nd runner-up at Miss Intercontinental 2014
Davao City	Isabel Pelayo	24	Davao City	
Davao Region	Johanna Yulo	39	Davao City	Oldest contestant completed at the pageant
Florida	Matea Smith	22	Coral Springs	Later Miss Grand Jamaica 2025 and Unplaced at Miss Grand International 2025
Hawaii	Bianca Tapia	26	Honolulu	Crowned as Miss Philippines Tourism 2024 (special title) at Miss World Philippines 2024; Appointed as Universal Woman United States 2026
Iloilo City	Alexie Brooks	23	Leon	Crowned Miss Eco International 2025
Kananga	Phoebe Torita	18	Kananga	
Laguna	Alexandra Rosales	27	Calamba	Completed at Binibining Pilipinas 2021; Crowned Miss Supermodel Worldwide 2022; 2nd runner-up at Miss Grand Philippines 2024
Leyte	Angel Tambal	25	La Paz	Resigned Winner of Miss Philippines Earth Water 2025
Lucban	Rikki de la Peña	25	Lucban	
Mandaue	Victoria Ingram	27	Mandaue	
Manila	Ysabel Macuja	20	Manila	Crowned as Hiyas ng Pilipinas Elite World 2024
Mariveles	Elle Hollman	32	Mariveles	
Miami	Mary Yasol	32	Parañaque	
Naic	Mary Guiral	23	Naic	Completed at Miss World Philippines 2021
Northern California	Kayla Carter	27	Jacksonville	Appointed as Miss Charm Philippines 2024; Top 10 at Miss Charm 2024
Nueva Ecija	Maica Martinez	30	Cabanatuan	Withdrew at Miss Universe Philippines 2025
Occidental Mindoro	Zoleil Taño	23	San Jose	
Pagadian	Hershey Senit	18	Pagadian	
Palawan	Raven Doctor	18	Puerto Princesa	Appointed as Miss Eco Teen Philippines 2024; 3rd runner-up and Miss Eco Teen Asia at Miss Eco Teen International 2024
Pampanga	Cyrille Payumo	26	Porac	Appointed as Miss Charm Philippines 2025; Top 20 at Miss Charm 2025
Pangasinan	Jineah Lumague	23	Pozorrubio	
Pasig	Selena Antonio-Reyes	38	Pasig	Completed at Binibining Pilipinas 2010; Top 10 finalists at Miss Grand Philippines 2024
Quezon	Ahtisa Manalo	26	Candelaria	Crowned Binibining Pilipinas International 2018; 1st Runner-up at Miss International 2018; Appointed as Miss Cosmo Philippines 2024; Top 10 finalist at Miss Cosmo 2024; Later Miss Universe Philippines 2025; 3rd runner-up, Third Place at the Beyond the Crown Award, and Best in National Costume at Miss Universe 2025
Quezon City	Cam Lagmay	31	Quezon City	
Quirino	Stephanie Gerona	33	Cabarroguis	
San Pablo	Eunice Deza	23	San Pablo	Later crowned as Mutya ng Pilipinas Top Model of the World 2025
Siargao	Joshell de Ocampo	26	Del Carmen	
Southern California	Jet Hammond	25	Arcadia	Withdrew at Miss Nevada USA 2026
Sydney	Jenina Lui	21	Sydney	
Tacloban	Tamara Ocier	23	Tacloban	
Taguig	Christi McGarry	33	Taguig	Completed at the Miss Intercontinental Twice (2010 & 2015); Won Binibining Pilipinas Intercontinental 2015
Talisay	Josephine Paaske	21	Talisay	
Toledo	Kim Placibe	19	Toledo	
Tuguegarao	Zhyra Cabalza	20	Tuguegarao	
United Kingdom	Christina Chalk	30	Dunblane	Later Miss Universe Great Britain 2024; Completed at Miss Universe 2024
Virginia	Denise Nicole	29	Virginia Beach	
Zambales	Anita Gomez	23	Subic	2nd runner-up at Miss Fit Philippines 2020; Finalist at Miss Philippines Earth 2021; Crowned as Miss Asia Pacific Philippines 2025; 1st runner-up at Miss Asia Pacific International 2025
