= Victoria Velasquez Vincent =

New Zealand model

- Born: Kim-Victoria Velasquez Vincent; 7 September 1995 (age 31); Auckland, New Zealand
- Occupations: Beauty pageant titleholder; architect
- Height: 1.75 m (5 ft 9 in)
- Beauty pageant titleholder
- Title: Miss Universe New Zealand 2024; Miss Universe Philippines Charity 2021
- Years active: 2021–present
- Hair colour: Brown
- Eye colour: Hazel
- Major competitions: Miss Universe Philippines 2021; (Top 3 – Miss Universe Philippines Charity); Miss Universe Philippines 2024; (Top 10); Miss Universe New Zealand 2024; (Winner); Miss Universe 2024; (Unplaced)

Kim-Victoria Velasquez Vincent (7 September 1995) is a New Zealand model and pageant titleholder who won Miss Universe New Zealand 2024. She represented her country at Miss Universe 2024 in Mexico on 14 November.

She previously competed in the Miss Universe Philippines 2021 pageant where she was crowned Miss Universe Philippines Charity 2021. Vincent previously competed at Miss Universe Philippines 2024, where she reached the top 10.

== Personal life ==
Vincent was born and raised in Auckland, New Zealand. Her mother Josephine Martinez Velasquez Vincent is from Bacoor, Cavite, Philippines. As a survivor of relationship violence, she rebranded herself by omitting her name, Kim, when she was 22.

== Pageantry ==
=== Miss Universe Philippines 2021 ===
On 1 September 2021, representing Cavite, Vincent was confirmed as one of the thirty delegates in the Miss Universe Philippines 2021 pageant. During the finals held on 30 September 2021, she placed second runner-up and was given the title of Miss Universe Philippines Charity 2021.

=== Miss Universe Philippines 2024 ===
On 18 February 2024, the Miss Universe Philippines organisation announced that Vincent would be one of the 54 candidates competing at Miss Universe Philippines 2024. She represented the City of Bacoor. On 22 May 2024, Victoria finished in the top 10, with Chelsea Manalo of Bulacan as the winner.

=== Miss Universe New Zealand 2024 ===
Vincent represented East Auckland on the final night, held in the Dorothy Winstone Centre on Sunday, 29 September 2024. At the end of the event, she was crowned Miss Universe New Zealand 2024 by Diamond Langi of Auckland and will represent New Zealand at the Miss Universe 2024 pageant, to be held in Mexico. She also won Best in Swimsuit and People's Choice awards.

=== Miss Universe 2024 ===
Vincent represented the New Zealand at the Miss Universe 2024 pageant held in Mexico, where she failed to advance to the Top 30.

Awards and achievements
Preceded by Diamond Langi	Miss Universe New Zealand; 2024	Succeeded by Abbigail Sturgin
New title	Miss Universe Philippines Charity; 2021	Succeeded by Pauline Amelinckx
