= Tarah Valencia =

Filipino model and beauty pageant titleholder

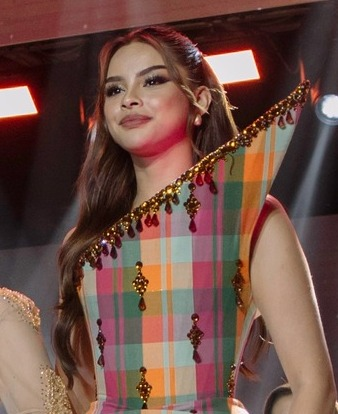
- Valencia in 2025
- Born: Justine Tarah Marie Valencia; May 30, 2001 (age 25); Baguio, Philippines
- Education: University of Baguio (BS)
- Beauty pageant titleholder
- Title: The Miss Philippines Supranational 2025
- Major competitions: Miss Universe Philippines 2024; (3rd Runner-Up); Miss Supranational 2025; (3rd Runner-Up)

Justine Tarah Marie Valencia (born May 30, 2001) is a Filipino model and beauty pageant titleholder who won Miss Supranational Philippines 2025 and represented the Philippines at Miss Supranational 2025 where she placed as third runner-up.

Valencia joined Miss Universe Philippines 2024 where she placed as third runner-up, later on she was appointed as Miss Supranational Philippines 2025 and represented the Philippines at Miss Supranational 2025 where she placed as third runner-up.

== Early life and education ==
Valencia was born on May 30, 2001 in Baguio, Philippines.

In 2023, Valencia graduated as a cum laude from the University of Baguio with the degree of Bachelor of Science in International Tourism Management with specialization in International Tourism.

== Pageantry ==
=== Miss Baguio 2023 ===
She joined her local pageant, Miss Baguio 2023 pageant where she won the title Miss Baguio Turismo 2023.

=== Miss Universe Philippines 2024 ===
Valencia represented Baguio at the Miss Universe Philippines 2024 where she placed as third runner-up, Chelsea Manalo of Bulacan was the winner of the pageant.

After the coronation night, she was appointed as Miss Supranational Philippines 2025 and she was crowned by Miss Supranational Philippines 2024, Alethea Ambrosio.

=== Miss Supranational 2025 ===
Valencia represented the Philippines at Miss Supranational 2025 pageant on June 27, 2025, in Nowy Sącz, Poland. Rian Fernandez designed her evening gown for the competition.

At the end of the event, she placed as third runner-up to Eduarda Braum of Brazil.

Awards and achievements
Preceded by Isadora Murta (Brazil)	Miss Supranational; 3rd Runner-up; 2025	Succeeded by Ndah Eno (Nigeria)
Preceded by Alethea Ambrosio (Bulacan)	Miss Supranational Philippines; 2025	Succeeded by Katrina Llegado (Taguig)
Not awarded	Miss Universe Philippines; 3rd Runner-up; 2024	Not awarded
