= Stacey Gabriel (actress) =

Filipino actress, model and entrepreneur (born 1997)

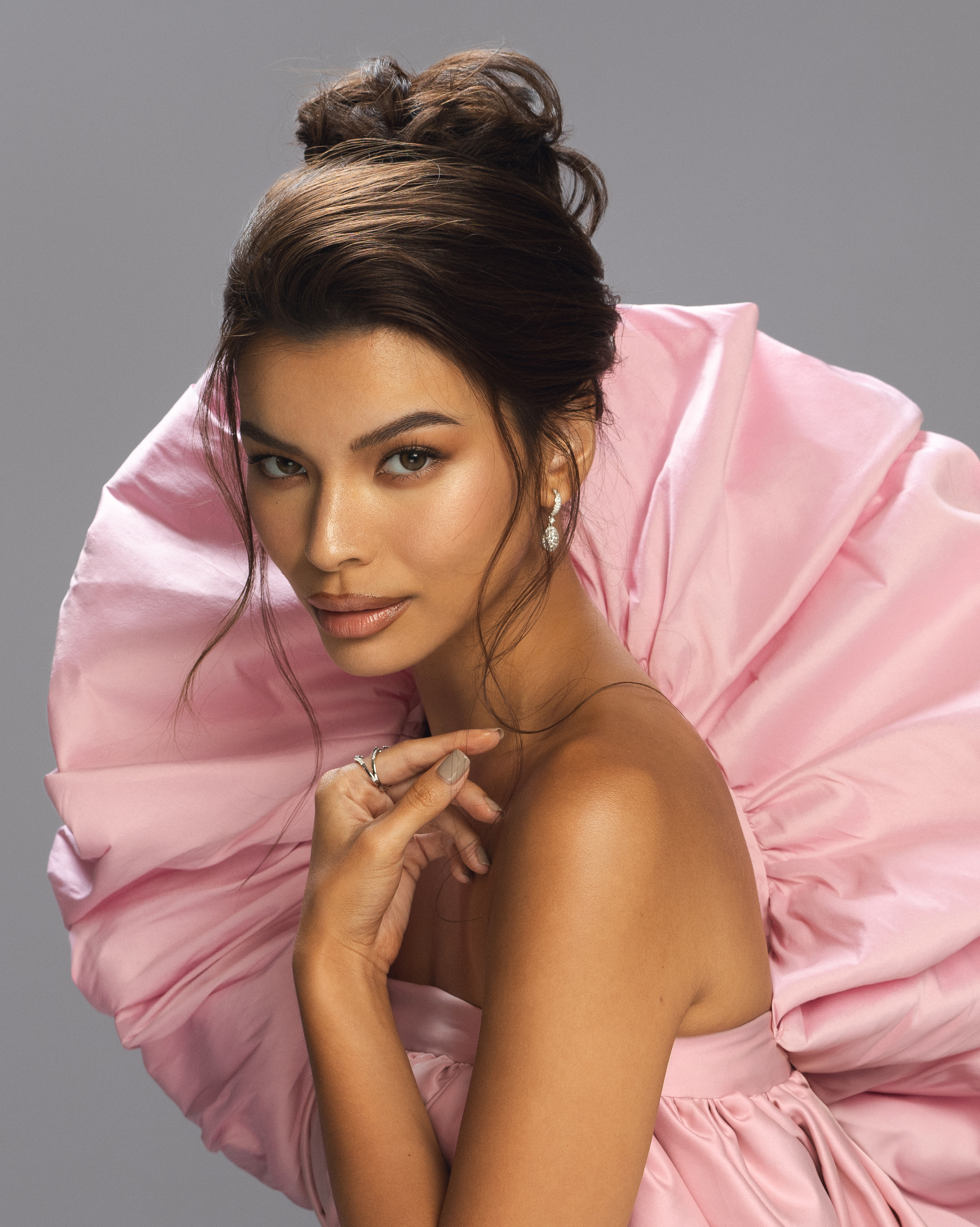
- Gabriel in 2024
- Born: Stacey Daniella Gabriel; August 24, 1997 (age 29); Manila, Philippines
- Occupations: Actress; model
- Beauty pageant titleholder
- Title: Miss Universe Philippines 2024 1st Runner-Up
- Years active: 2017–present
- Major competitions: Binibining Pilipinas 2022; (2nd Runner-Up); Miss Universe Philippines 2024; (1st Runner-Up)

Stacey Daniella Gabriel (born 24 August 1997) is a Filipino actress, beauty pageant titleholder, model, and entrepreneur. As representative for Cainta, Gabriel competed in Miss Universe Philippines 2024, where she finished 1st Runner-Up. She is also known for her role as Master Sgt. Tricia Almario on the hit Philippine action drama series FPJ's Ang Probinsyano.

== Early life ==
Gabriel was born in Manila, Philippines to a single mother, and is of Filipino and Spanish descent. She was bullied in school, hence finding comfort in acting, proclaiming herself a "theater kid" at an early age.

== Acting career ==
Gabriel struck a deal with her mother that she would wait until finishing high school before pursuing her professional acting career. After graduation, she started taking acting classes and eventually made her acting debut in a guest role on Ipaglaban Mo! in 2017. Two years later, Gabriel auditioned for the hit Philippine action drama series FPJ’s Ang Probinsyano. She was cast by the star and producer of the show, Coco Martin, to play Master Sgt. Tricia Almario, a member of the crime-fighting Task Force Agila.

== Pageantry ==
=== Binibining Pilipinas 2022 ===
In 2022, Gabriel made a career pivot when she joined Binibining Pilipinas. During the televised pageant, Gabriel platformed a message of mental health de-stigmatization and stood up to revisionist history in a timely and politically motivated question and answer portion. Actor Joshua Garcia asked her, “Personally, how do you distinguish a historian from a Marites? She answered:

"A historian is one who recognizes our painful past with factual evidence; looking back at our rich, vibrant, history, as well as the times when our humanity was trampled on and our heritage was almost erased. If we look at our past, we can surely move onward and upward, and rebuild, rise from this pandemic, and dream for a safer, healthier, and happier Philippines."

Gabriel was deemed to have "won netizens' hearts" and finished with the 2nd Runner-Up title.

=== Miss Universe Philippines 2024 ===
In February 2024, Gabriel announced her return to pageantry as the representative of Cainta at Miss Universe Philippines 2024. On April 20, 2024, Gabriel found success in the Swimsuit Challenge, a pre-pageant event held in Boracay. Garnering the most accolades of the night, she was announced the first-ever Miss We Sportz, as well as one of the eight "Aqua Angels" and one of the 20 "Arete Tagaytay Goddesses."

At the Miss Universe Philippines coronation night on May 22, 2024, host Jeannie Mai announced Gabriel’s advancement into the top ten, then posed the impromptu question: "Tell me a juicy secret you have never told anybody else before." To that, Gabriel gave her now-famous answer:

"Are you kidding me? In front of the whole universe? Well, I guess the secret would be that I have so much hairspray on, I am extremely flammable. So don’t come near, anybody with a lighter!"

Upon becoming a Top 5 finalist, Gabriel fielded another prompt from Mai during the Question and Answer segment. She was asked, "Women have inspired you all throughout your life. Now, tell us about how you have inspired another woman." Gabriel responded:

"You know, I’ve been told many times that I am too short to join a beauty pageant; but now, I realize that pageants are a representation, a reflection, of that very nation. And tonight, I am not only representing myself, but every Filipina woman who sees themselves in me. I hope to inspire every Filipina that just like the universe, we too, are limitless."

Gabriel went on to secure the position of 1st Runner-Up in the 2024 Miss Universe Philippines Pageant.

While there were four other crowns available that night, Gabriel has since explained that she respectfully declined offers to be appointed a titleholder for a different pageant organization, choosing instead to remain Miss Universe Philippines 2024 1st Runner-Up.

In April 2025, Gabriel was among the "top queens" featured prominently in A Queen's Runway, a documentary film streaming on Netflix, which takes audiences behind the scenes of the Miss Universe Philippines competition.

== Charity work ==
In March 2024, Gabriel formally introduced the Daisy Legacy Ministry, a prison outreach program for incarcerated senior citizen women. Her dedication to prison ministry began when her late grandmother, Daisy, introduced her to the cause at age 14. Today, the outreach includes over 700 inmates at the Correctional Institution for Women in Mandaluyong, Philippines.

== Filmography ==
=== Television ===
Year	Title	Role	Notes
2017	Ipaglaban Mo!	Carly	Episode: "Groufie"
2018	Ngayon at Kailanman (2018 TV series)	(Girlfriend of Oliver’s friend)	
2018	Class 3-C Has a Secret	Sapphire Garcia	Lead role (season 2), 12 episodes
2019	Wansapanataym	Catriona	Episode: "Mr. Cutepido"
2019	Ang Probinsyano	Tricia Almario	Recurring role, 18 episodes
2021	Parang Kayo Pero Hindi	Caitlyn	Recurring role
2024	Family Feud Philippines	Self	Episode: "Beauty Queens"

=== Film ===
Year	Title	Role	Notes
2018	The Day After Valentine's	Mandy	Feature film
2025	A Queen's Runway	Self	Documentary film on Netflix

Awards and achievements
Preceded by Meiji Cruz (Valenzuela)	Binibining Pilipinas (2nd Runner-Up); 2022	Succeeded by Atasha Reign Parani (General Trias)
Preceded by Christine Juliane Opiaza (Zambales)	Miss Universe Philippines (1st Runner-Up); 2024	Succeeded by Teresita Ssen Marquez (Muntinlupa)
