= Christi McGarry =

Filipino-American model

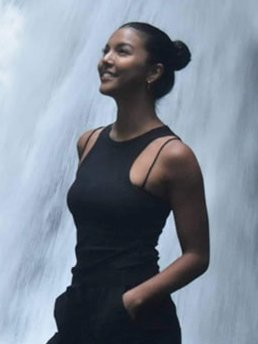
- McGarry in 2022
- Born: Christi Lynn Landrito McGarry
- Height: 1.80 m (5 ft 11 in)
- Beauty pageant titleholder
- Title: Mutya ng Pilipinas Asia Pacific 2010; Binibining Pilipinas Intercontinental 2015
- Major competitions: Miss New Jersey Teen USA; (1st Runner-Up); Mutya ng Pilipinas 2010; (Winner – Mutya ng Pilipinas Asia Pacific 2010); Miss Intercontinental 2010; (Top 15); (Continental Queen of Asia and Oceania); Top Model of the World 2010; (Top 15); Binibining Pilipinas 2015; (Winner – Binibining Pilipinas Intercontinental 2015); Miss Intercontinental 2015; (1st Runner-Up); (Continental Queen of Asia and Oceania); Miss Universe Philippines 2024; (4th Runner-Up)

Christi Lynn Landrito McGarry is a Filipina model and beauty pageant titleholder who was crowned Binibining Pilipinas Intercontinental 2015 and represented the Philippines at the Miss Intercontinental 2015 pageant where she finished first runner-up and awarded as the Continental Queen of Asia and Oceania.

She also represented Taguig at the Miss Universe Philippines 2024 pageant, where she placed fourth runner-up.

== Pageantry ==
=== Miss New Jersey Teen USA 2008 ===
McGarry entered Miss New Jersey Teen USA 2008, and was first runner-up to Michelle Leonardo.

=== Mutya ng Pilipinas 2010 ===
McGarry entered Mutya ng Pilipinas 2010 and was crowned Mutya ng Pilipinas Asia Pacific 2010. She replaced Janina Lizardo, Mutya ng Pilipinas Intercontinental 2010, to represent the Philippines at Miss Intercontinental 2010.

=== Miss Intercontinental 2010 ===
McGarry represented the Philippines at the Miss Intercontinental 2010 pageant and finished as one of the top 15 semifinalist, and also received the Miss Intercontinental Continental Queen of Asia and the Pacific award.

=== Top Model of the World 2010 ===
McGarry was appointed by the Mutya ng Pilipinas organization to represent the Philippines at Top Model of the World 2010 and finished as a top 15 semifinalist.

=== Binibining Pilipinas 2015 ===
McGarry entered Binibining Pilipinas 2015 and was crowned Binibining Pilipinas Intercontinental 2015.

=== Miss Intercontinental 2015 ===
McGarry represented the Philippines at the Miss Intercontinental 2015 pageant in Magdeburg, Germany, and was the first Filipina to represent the country twice in the same international pageant. She finished first runner-up along with the Miss Intercontinental Continental Queen of Asia and Oceania award.

Awards and achievements
Preceded by Kris Janson	Binibining Pilipinas — Intercontinental; 2015	Succeeded by Jennifer Hammond
