= Ahtisa Manalo =

Filipino beauty pageant titleholder (born 1997)

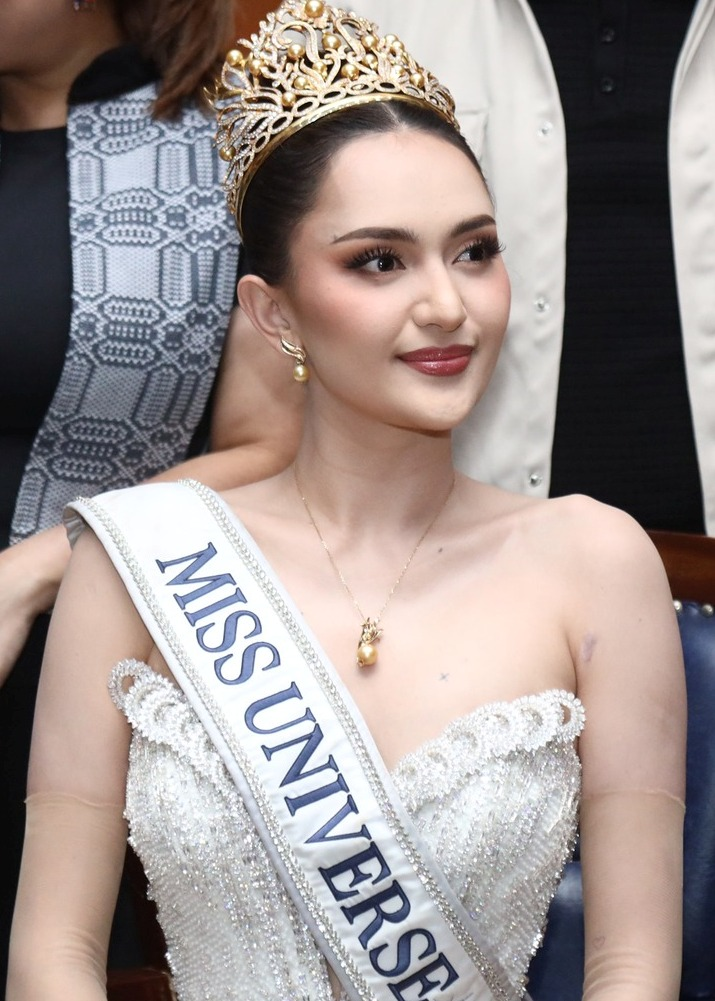
- Manalo in 2025
- Born: Ma. Ahtisa Manalo; May 25, 1997 (age 29); Candelaria, Quezon, Philippines
- Education: Manuel S. Enverga University Foundation (BSA)
- Height: 5 ft 8 in (173 cm)
- Beauty pageant titleholder
- Title: Binibining Pilipinas International 2018; Miss Cosmo Philippines 2024; Miss Universe Philippines 2025
- Major competitions: Binibining Pilipinas 2018; (Winner – Binibining Pilipinas International 2018); Miss International 2018; (1st Runner-Up); Miss Universe Philippines 2024; (2nd Runner-Up); Miss Cosmo 2024; (Top 10); Miss Universe Philippines 2025; (Winner); Miss Universe 2025; (3rd Runner-Up); (Best National Costume)

Ma. Ahtisa Manalo (Note: Tagalog: [mɐˈɾia ʔɐˈtɪsa mɐˈnalɔ]) (born May 25, 1997) is a Filipino actress and beauty pageant titleholder who won Miss Universe Philippines 2025. She represented the Philippines at Miss Universe 2025, where she was the third runner-up.

Manalo represented the Philippines at Miss International 2018, where she was the first runner-up. She later represented Quezon at Miss Universe Philippines 2024 where she was second runner-up, and was subsequently appointed to represent the Philippines at Miss Cosmo 2024, where she finished in the top 10.

== Early life and education ==
Ma. Ahtisa Manalo was born on May 25, 1997, in Candelaria, Quezon, to a Filipino-Spanish mother and a Finnish-Swedish father. She was named after her biological father, Ahti. She was raised by her grandmother with financial support from her godfather for her education. Manalo intended to become a police officer and applied to the Philippine National Police Academy. She has a degree in accountancy from the Manuel S. Enverga University Foundation.

== Pageantry ==
=== Early pageants ===
Manalo began participating in local beauty pageants at the age of 10 to help support her education. In 2017, she competed in her first national pageant, Reyna ng Aliwan, a festival-themed competition. She represented the Niyogyugan Festival of Quezon and was second runner-up.

=== Binibining Pilipinas 2018 ===
On March 18, 2018, Manalo participated in the Binibining Pilipinas 2018 pageant held at the Araneta Coliseum, where she reached the top 15. During the final question and answer portion, she was asked how a beauty queen should respond to ruthless criticism, to which she replied that public figures should address criticism mindfully and constructively. She would end her run as Binibining Pilipinas International 2018, being crowned by outgoing titleholder Maria Angelica de Leon. At 20 years old, she was the youngest winner in that edition of the pageant.

=== Miss International 2018 ===
As the winner of Binibining Pilipinas International 2018, Manalo represented the Philippines at Miss International 2018, held on November 9, 2018, at the Tokyo Dome City Hall. For the coronation night, she wore a gown designed by Filipino couturier Michael Cinco. In the Top 8 final speech, she highlighted her willingness to lead despite her young age and expressed her commitment to serving as "the voice of the youth," emphasizing that "hard work and determination can overcome obstacles." She finished as the first runner-up to Mariem Velazco of Venezuela.

=== Between pageants (2019–2024) ===
At the end of her reign as Binibining Pilipinas International, she crowned Bea Magtanong as her successor during the 2019 pageant. Later on, local publications including The Philippine Star considered Manalo a potential candidate for future national pageants. She filed her application for Miss Universe Philippines 2020, but later withdrew due to medical issues. Her withdrawal led to accusations that her application was a publicity stunt, though she clarified that she had submitted her application late, as she was uncertain about her decision to compete.

She served as a judge at Binibining Pilipinas 2022.

=== Miss Universe Philippines 2024 ===
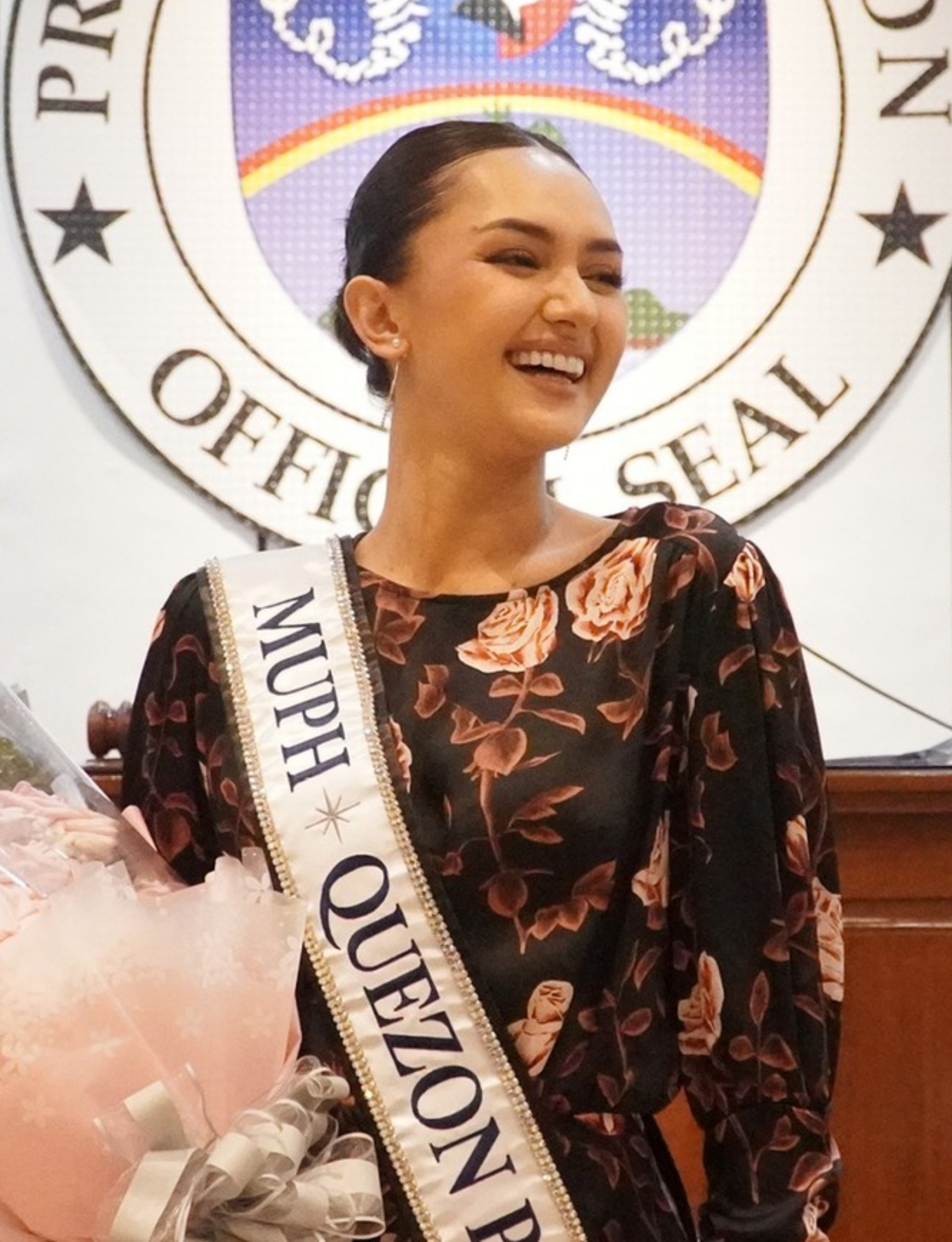
Manalo as the local titleholder for Quezon in 2024.

On January 27, 2024, the accredited partner of Quezon for Miss Universe Philippines appointed Manalo as their delegate at the contest's 2024 edition. Leading up to the competition, media publications regarded her as a "heavy favorite" to win the title.

During the preliminary competition, she earned eight special awards from the pageant's sponsors, the most of any contestant that year. Manalo worked with Cinco again for her gown for the coronation night. She advanced to the Top 5 and, when asked about the most important lesson she had learned from another woman, highlighted the value of kindness. She cited her grandmother as the embodiment of an ideal woman.

Manalo was announced as the second runner-up to Chelsea Manalo of Bulacan. Following the coronation, Manalo was appointed Miss Cosmo Philippines 2024. Manalo's finish was criticized online as a "downgrade" from her first runner-up position at Miss International 2018. In response, she explained that she chose the title, drawing from her experiences in the startup industry and her passion for "being part of making something out of nothing".

=== Miss Cosmo 2024 ===
Manalo sustained a sprained ankle when the stage for the Miss Cosmo finals collapsed during rehearsals. For the national costume presentation on September 19, she wore an orange ensemble designed by Ehran Montoya, inspired by Dyesebel, a popular fictional mermaid. She placed third in the Cosmo People's Choice national costume poll.

Manalo finished in the top 10 after advancing through the first round of the People's Choice Award. She also received the overall People's Choice Award and the title of Miss Cosmo Tourism Ambassador. Following her finish in the pageant, Manalo encouraged her supporters to refrain from bullying the Miss Cosmo organization or its winner.

=== Miss Universe Philippines 2025 ===
Manalo during Miss Universe Philippines 2025

On February 13, 2025, Manalo was reappointed as the local Miss Universe Philippines titleholder for Quezon. In a media interview, she revealed that her second appointment had been a "last-minute decision" due to the withdrawal of her local successor.

During the preliminary competition, Manalo won four special awards from the pageant's sponsors. Her national costume, inspired by the mythical creature tiktik, was designed by Ehrran Montoya.

Manalo advanced to the top 24 and later reached the Top 12. During the evening gown competition, she stumbled after stepping on her gown but quickly recovered.

Manalo advanced to the top six, where she was asked to describe a time she led by example and its impact. She referred to an earlier on-stage mishap, using it to illustrate how she overcomes setbacks. She also noted that winning the title was a shared aspiration with her late grandmother.

At the end of the event, Manalo was crowned Miss Universe Philippines 2025 by her predecessor, Chelsea Manalo of Bulacan. During her reign, she hosted the Mister International 2025 pageant in Thailand, held in September.

=== Miss Universe 2025 ===
Manalo at Miss Universe 2025

Manalo represented the Philippines at the Miss Universe 2025 pageant in Thailand, held on November 21, 2025. With her biography and prior pageant experience, media regarded her as a frontrunner for the title leading up to the contest. For her video entry for the "Beyond the Crown" competition, Manalo advocated for education and youth leadership. At the post-pageant party, the Miss Universe Organization recognized her as a "Beyond the Crown" honoree for her advocacy.

For the national costume competition, Manalo presented the "Festajada: Queen of Philippine Festivals", a traje de mestiza designed by Filipino fashion designer Mak Tumang, which was inspired by the festivals of the Philippines, including the Giant Lantern Festival of Pampanga, the Pahiyas Festival of Lucban, and the Panagbenga Festival of Baguio. Her national costume was recognized as the best among all the candidates following the competition. The same designer also made Manalo's preliminary gown, coined "Pinctada", derived from the Pinctada maxima, the luminous shell that holds the precious South Sea pearl. For the finals, she collaborated with Filipino fashion designer Val Taguba to create an evening gown made from ultra-light organza, the world's thinnest fabric.

During the coronation night, Manalo became a top 30 semifinalist, progressed to the top 12 and then the top five question-and-answer portion. In the first round, she was asked about her contribution to humanity. Manalo expressed her desire to inspire people by serving as a symbol of hope. Drawing from her personal experiences—beginning her pageant journey at a young age to support her education and family—she aimed to be a role model who overcame poverty through hard work, persistence, and determination. She wanted to show others that they, too, can rise above difficult circumstances. In the final question, when asked how she would use the Miss Universe platform to empower young girls, Manalo highlighted her involvement with Alon Akademie, a non-profit organization dedicated to helping young individuals recognize that their circumstances do not dictate their future. She expressed her intention to use the Miss Universe platform to amplify this initiative and provide equal opportunities for those from low-income backgrounds.

At the end of the event, Manalo named as the third runner-up to Fátima Bosch of Mexico.

== Other ventures ==
Manalo is involved in the café business, managing two establishments in Australia—Cafe Noun and Call Me Harris. She has also played a key role in the creation and expansion of food brands such as Koomi, Oh My Greek, and Zig Foods, with locations in her home province of Quezon, across the Philippines, and internationally.

On October 9, 2024, Manalo filed her candidacy to run for a seat in the Candelaria Municipal Council in 2025, running as an independent under the slate of incumbent mayor Ogie Suayan. She later withdrew from the race after being reappointed as the local Miss Universe Philippines titleholder for Quezon.

=== Acting career ===
On March 10, 2026, Sparkle GMA Artist Center signed Manalo as an artist under the agency. Later that year, she appeared on the GMA Network series Encantadia Chronicles: Sang'gre and the second season of The Master Cutter. She is slated to make her film debut with the thriller-comedy Red Crown in October 2026.

== Public image ==
Manalo is often referred to in the media as the pambansang manika (lit. 'national doll'), owing to her doll-like features. Leading up to Miss International 2018, pageant analysts noted that she possessed "the beauty, charm, demeanor, and physique" ideal for success in the competition.

== Advocacy and platforms ==
Manalo identifies as an ally of the LGBTQIA+ community and an advocate for gender equality. She is also involved with Alon Akademie, an organization that focuses on developing children's global citizenship, social skills, and entrepreneurial mindset.

== Filmography ==
=== Film ===
Year	Title	Role	Notes	Ref(s).
2026	Red Crown	Dolly Dizon	Feature film debut	

=== Television ===
Year	Title	Role	Notes	Ref(s).
2026	Encantadia Chronicles: Sang'gre	Haliya		
2026	The Master Cutter: Anak ng Sinulid	TBA	Season 2	

== Notes ==
Awards and achievements
Preceded by Suchata Chuangsri (Thailand)	Miss Universe 3rd Runner-Up; 2025	Incumbent
Preceded by Chelsea Manalo (Philippines)	Miss Universe Best National Costume; 2025	Incumbent
Preceded by Chelsea Manalo (Bulacan)	Miss Universe Philippines; 2025	Succeeded by Bea Millan-Windorski (La Union)
New title	Cosmo People's Choice Award; 2024	Succeeded by Chelsea Fernandez (Philippines)
New title	Cosmo's Tourism Ambassador; 2024	Succeeded by Christina Lasasimma (Laos)
New title	Miss Cosmo Philippines; 2024	Succeeded by Chelsea Fernandez (Sultan Kudarat)
Preceded by Chanelle de Lau (Curaçao)	Miss International 1st Runner-Up; 2018	Succeeded by Andrea Toscano (Mexico)
Preceded by Mariel de Leon (Las Piñas)	Binibining Pilipinas International; 2018	Succeeded by Bea Magtanong (Bataan)
