= Chelsea Manalo =

Filipino beauty pageant titleholder (born 1999)

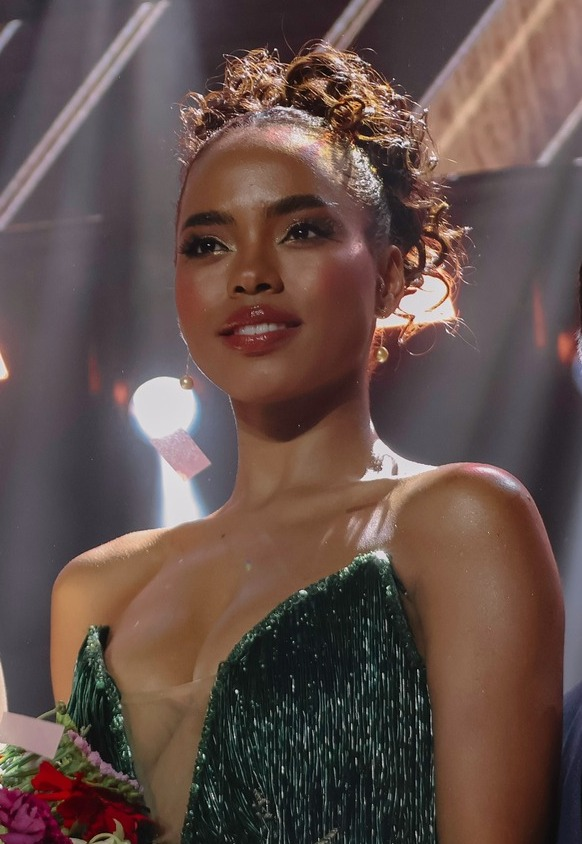
- Manalo in 2025
- Born: Chelsea Anne Manalo; October 14, 1999 (age 27); Meycauayan, Bulacan, Philippines
- Education: De La Salle Araneta University (BS)
- Occupation: Model
- Beauty pageant titleholder
- Title: Miss Universe Philippines 2024; Miss Universe Asia 2024
- Major competitions: Miss World Philippines 2017; (Top 15); Miss Universe Philippines 2024; (Winner); Miss Universe 2024; (Top 30); (Miss Universe Asia); (Best National Costume)

Chelsea Anne Manalo (Tagalog: [ˈtʃɛlsi mɐˈnalɔ]; born October 14, 1999) is a Filipino model and beauty pageant titleholder who won Miss Universe Philippines 2024. As the first Filipino of African descent to win the national competition, Manalo represented the Philippines at Miss Universe 2024, where she finished as a top-30 semifinalist and was named the inaugural continental queen for Asia.

An advocate for indigenous Dumagat people, Manalo campaigns for youth education, accessibility, and empowerment. Manalo previously competed in Miss World Philippines 2017 and reached the top 15.

== Early life and education ==
Manalo was born in Malhacan, Meycauayan, Bulacan, on October 14, 1999, to a Filipino mother, Contessa Manalo, and an African-American father. Her parents separated in 2000 after her mother refused to join her father in relocating to the United States. After her father's death, Contessa remarried and raised Manalo with her stepfather Randy Angeles. She briefly lived in Las Vegas, Nevada, with her biological paternal grandmother from ages ten through twelve. Manalo graduated from De La Salle Araneta University with a degree in tourism management.

== Modeling career ==
Manalo began working as a model at age 14 and began her career in pageantry as a high school student. Manalo has cited British model Naomi Campbell as an inspiration for her modeling career. In 2021, Manalo became an endorser for the Philippine clothing brand Bench.

== Pageantry ==
=== Miss World Philippines 2017 ===
Manalo competed in Miss World Philippines 2017. In the run-up to the pageant, Rappler named her a "dark horse" candidate, praising her for her runway walk. In the fast-track events, Manalo was named as a finalist for the "Top Model" challenge, which was won by Thia Tomalla. At the final on September 3, 2017, Manalo reached the top 15, with the winner being Laura Lehmann.

Following Miss World Philippines, Manalo was a potential candidate for Miss Universe Philippines 2021.

=== Miss Universe Philippines 2024 ===
Manalo competed in the Miss Universe Philippines 2024 pageant as the representative of Bulacan.

During the competition, Manalo drew flak online for including the construction site of the New Manila International Airport, whose development was subject to environmental concerns, in her tourism video for the pageant. In the preliminary competition, Manalo won one special award from the pageant's sponsors.

On the coronation night, Manalo advanced to the top five, where she was asked, "You are beautiful and confident. How would you use these qualities to empower others?". In her answer, she emphasized her experiences as a woman of color and touted herself as a "transformational woman".

Manalo won the competition and was crowned by outgoing titleholder Michelle Dee. With her win, Manalo became the first Filipino of African descent to be selected to represent the Philippines at Miss Universe. Her win was celebrated online as a challenge to the "ingrained preference for Eurocentric beauty" long held in the country. The provincial government of Bulacan honored Manalo with a homecoming parade on June 9. In July 2024, the city government of Meycauayan bestowed Manalo a Gintong Kawayan Recognition and a Pin of Honor.

Manalo appeared in the music video for "La Bulaqueña" by Orange and Lemons. On November 14, Jojo Bragais unveiled a footwear design inspired by Manalo.

=== Miss Universe 2024 ===
Manalo represented the Philippines at Miss Universe 2024 at the Mexico City Arena in Mexico City, Mexico. In her Voice for Change entry, Manalo advocated for advancing the welfare of children of Overseas Filipino Workers (OFWs).

In the national costume presentation held in conjunction with the preliminary rounds on November 14, Manalo wore a Manny Halasan design titled "Hiraya" (transl. I hope – transl. I wish) which references the Manila galleon and the arrival of Christianity and Islam in the country. For the evening gown portion, Manalo wore a simple blue ball gown inspired by the country's seas. Her performance in the preliminary contests led to varied reactions online; some profiled Manalo as an "underrated", "dark horse" candidate while others noted a decline in her performance from the national competition.

During the coronation night, Manalo progressed to the swimsuit competition where she showcased her "tampisaw walk". She finished as a top 30 semifinalist, with Victoria Kjær Theilvig of Denmark being the winner. Following the pageant, Manalo was named as the continental queen for Asia, becoming the first entrant to win the title. On November 30, Manalo was named the winner of the National Costume Competition, marking back-to-back wins for the Philippines, following Dee's victory the preceding year.

== Advocacies ==
Manalo is an advocate for the indigenous Dumagat people of Norzagaray, Bulacan. She has worked with the youth organization Kids for Kids, which aims to reach out and empower indigenous youth.

== Personal life ==
Manalo is a devotee of Our Lady of Antipolo, a Black Madonna which was featured on her Manny Halasan ensemble for the National Costume pageant segment in 2024. She is currently dating Filipino-American basketball player Cole Micek.

== Videography ==
=== Film ===
Year	Title	Role	Ref!
2025	Call Me Mother	Herself	

=== Music videos ===
Title	Year	Artist	Ref.
"La Bulaqueña"	2024	Orange and Lemons	

Awards and achievements
New title	Miss Universe Asia; 2024	Succeeded by Zhao Na (China)
Preceded by Michelle Dee (Philippines)	Miss Universe Best National Costume; 2024	Succeeded by Ahtisa Manalo
Preceded by Michelle Dee (Makati)	Miss Universe Philippines; 2024	Succeeded by Ahtisa Manalo (Quezon)
Preceded by Princess Marcos (Paombong)	Miss Universe Philippines Bulacan; 2024	Succeeded by Franchezca Pacheco (Meycauayan)
