= Miss Universe Philippines 2021 =

2nd Miss Universe Philippines pageant

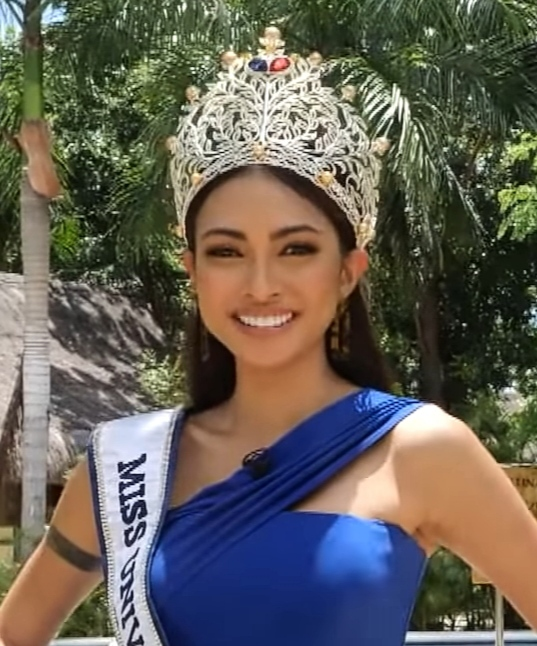
- Beatrice Luigi Gomez
- Date: September 30, 2021
- Presenters: KC Montero
- Entertainment: Sam Concepcion; Michael Pangilinan
- Theme: Inspire You
- Venue: Henann Resort Convention Center, Alona Beach, Panglao, Bohol
- Broadcaster: ABS-CBN; GMA Network
- Entrants: 28
- Placements: 16
- Withdrawals: Davao City; Zambales
- Winner: Beatrice Gomez; Cebu City
- Best National Costume: Maria Corazon Abalos, Mandaluyong
- Photogenic: Kisses Delavin, Masbate

External videos
- Grand Coronation Night

Miss Universe Philippines 2021 was the second Miss Universe Philippines pageant, held at the Henann Resort Convention Center in Alona Beach, Panglao, Bohol, on September 30, 2021. Originally scheduled to be held on September 25, 2021, the event was postponed to September 30, 2021 due to the sudden surge of COVID-19 cases in the Philippines.

Rabiya Mateo of Iloilo City crowned Beatrice Gomez of Cebu City as Miss Universe Philippines 2021 at the end of the event. Gomez eventually represented the Philippines at the Miss Universe 2021 pageant in Eilat, Israel, in December 2021 and finished as a finalist.

Contestants from twenty-eight localities competed in this edition. The pageant was hosted by KC Montero. Filipino singers Sam Concepcion and Michael Pangilinan performed as musical guests.

== Background ==
=== Location and date ===
On July 14, 2021, the organization announced that the coronation for the Miss Universe Philippines 2021 pageant will be held on September 25. However, on six days before the scheduled finals, the organization announced that the coronation night was postponed due to the sudden surge of COVID-19 cases in the Philippines. On September 24, it was announced that the finals would be held on September 30, 2021 at the Henann Resort Convention Center in Alona Beach, Panglao, Bohol.

=== Selection of participants ===
On May 8, 2021, the organization launched its search for the next Filipina who will represent the Philippines at the Miss Universe 2021 competition. The final submission of applications was on July 15, 2021.

On July 14, 2021, the Miss Universe Philippines organization announced a new format for the 2021 pageant. 100 delegates will be initially chosen. The 100 delegates will undergo different challenges where they will be reduced to 75, then 50, and then 30. The 30 remaining delegates will compete live and in person for the coronation night.

==== Top 100 ====
On July 19, the organization announced its Top 100 delegates. They competed in a headshot challenge and a video introduction challenge. Votes via the Miss Universe Philippines app and the scores of the board of judges determine the Top 75 delegates that was announced on August 8, 2021.

Challenge	Judge	Contestant	Ref.
Headshot Challenge	Fan Vote Winner	Masbate – Kisses Delavin	
Headshot Challenge	Panelists' Choice	Mandaluyong – Maria Corazon Abalos	
Introduction Challenge	Fan Vote Winner	Masbate – Kisses Delavin	
Introduction Challenge	Panelists' Choice	Cebu City – Beatrice Gomez	

==== Top 75 ====
On August 8, 2021, the organization announced its Top 75 delegates. They competed in a runway challenge and a casting video challenge. Votes via the Miss Universe Philippines app and the scores of the board of judges determined the Top 50 delegates that was announced on August 22, 2021.

Challenge	Judge	Contestant	Ref.
Runway Challenge	Fan Vote Winner	Cebu – Steffi Aberasturi	
Runway Challenge	Panelists' Choice	Cebu – Steffi Aberasturi	
Casting Challenge	Fan Vote Winner	Pangasinan – Maureen Wroblewitz	
Casting Challenge	Panelists' Choice	Pangasinan – Maureen Wroblewitz	

==== Top 50 ====
On August 22, 2021, the organization announced its Top 50 delegates. They competed in a virtual interview challenge.

Challenge	Judge	Contestant	Ref.
Interview Challenge	Panelists' Choice	Cavite – Victoria Velasquez Vincent	

==== Top 30 ====
On September 1, 2021, the organization announced its Top 30 delegates. Three delegates advanced to the Top 30 through online voting on the Miss Universe Philippines app and 27 delegates were chosen based from all of the challenges which were scored by the panel of experts. These thirty delegates will compete live and in-person for the coronation night.

Result	Contestants	Ref.
Fan Vote Winners	Cebu – Steffi Aberasturi; Masbate – Kisses Delavin; Pangasinan – Maureen Wroblewitz	

On September 13, 2021, Joanna Marie Rabe of Zambales withdrew from the competition due to dengue fever. On September 19, 2021, Ybonne Ortega of Davao City withdrew from the competition after testing positive for COVID-19.

== Results ==
=== Placements ===
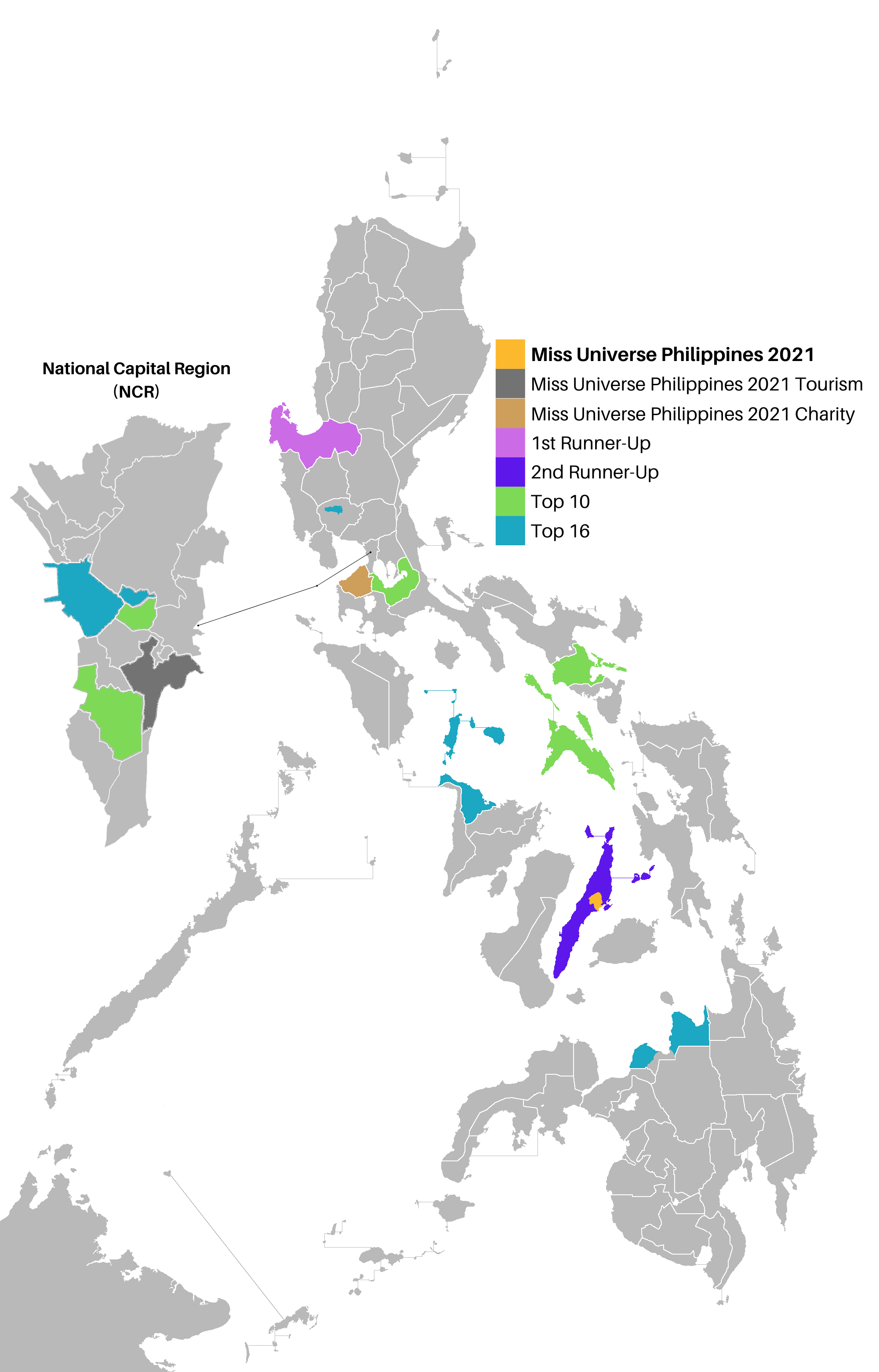
The Philippine map results of Miss Universe Philippines 2021, colors shaded in each province/cities.

Placement	Contestant
Miss Universe Philippines 2021	Cebu City – Beatrice Gomez
Miss Universe Philippines Tourism 2021	Taguig – Katrina Dimaranan
Miss Universe Philippines Charity 2021	Cavite – Victoria Velasquez Vincent
1st Runner-Up	Pangasinan – Maureen Wroblewitz
2nd Runner-Up	Cebu – Steffi Aberasturi
Top 10	Albay – Janela Joy Cuaton; Laguna – Leren Bautista; Mandaluyong – Maria Corazon Abalos; Masbate – Kisses Delavin §; Parañaque – Maria Ingrid Teresita Santamaria
Top 16	Aklan – Christelle Anjali Abello; Angeles – Mirjan Hipolito; Manila – Izabella Jasmine Umali; Misamis Oriental – Chella Grace Falconer; Romblon – Jane Nicole Miñano; San Juan – Rousanne Marie Bernos

§ – Lazada Fan Vote Winner

=== Major awards ===
Award	Contestant	Ref.
Best in Evening Gown	Cebu City – Beatrice Gomez	
Best in Swimsuit	Cebu City – Beatrice Gomez	
Best in National Costume	Mandaluyong – Maria Corazon Abalos	
Miss Photogenic (Miss Luxxe White Face of the Universe)	Masbate – Kisses Delavin	

=== Special awards ===
Award	Contestant	Ref.
Face of Belo SunExpert	Taguig – Katrina Dimaranan	
Miss SavePoint Plus	Taguig – Katrina Dimaranan	
Frontrow Philippines Fitness Routine Challenge	Aklan – Christelle Abello; Albay – Janela Joy Cuaton	
Miss K-Pads	Albay – Janela Joy Cuaton	
Lazada Video Contest	Masbate – Kisses Delavin	
Miss RFOX Philippines	Masbate – Kisses Delavin	
Miss Universe Philippines Lazada	Masbate – Kisses Delavin	
Miss Air Asia Philippines	Pangasinan – Maureen Wroblewitz	
Miss Hennan	Pangasinan – Maureen Wroblewitz	
Miss Bragais	Laguna – Leren Bautista	
Miss Organic Barley	Laguna – Leren Bautista	
Miss CopperMask	Pasig – Princess Kristha Singh	
Miss Cream Silk	Cebu City – Beatrice Gomez	
Miss Luxxe ImmunPlus Game Changer	Cebu City – Beatrice Gomez	
Miss Luxxe White Reveal Instabright Stunner	Cebu – Steffi Aberasturi	

== Pageant ==
=== National Costume competition ===
On September 23, 2021, the national costume competition of the 28 delegates premiered on YouTube as a music video featuring the new BGYO track "Kulay". For this edition's national costume competition, the Miss Universe Philippines organization decided to pay tribute to Manila Carnival queens, an annual pre-World War II national exposition, carnival, and pageant in Manila that celebrated products of Philippine provinces. This years' national costumes were all inspired by the pre-war pageantry, while donning elements that represent their provinces and cities.

=== Preliminary competition ===
Originally, the preliminary interviews was scheduled for September 21, 2021 and the preliminary swimsuit and evening gown competition would be on September 23, 2021 but was moved to later dates due to the COVID-19 pandemic. The preliminary interviews was later streamed on September 24, 2021 and the preliminary swimsuit and evening gown competition on September 26, 2021 thru KTX.ph.

=== Selection committee ===
==== Preliminary competition ====
- Sam Verzosa – CEO and Co-Founder of Frontrow Philippines
- Shamcey Supsup-Lee – Miss Universe Philippines 2011 and National Director of Miss Universe Philippines Organization
- Jonas Gaffud – Creative Director of Miss Universe Philippines Organization

==== Final competition ====
- Joanne Golong-Gomez – Commercial Director of Hilton Manila
- Sam Verzosa – CEO and Co-Founder of Frontrow Philippines
- Vicki Belo – Founder and Medical Director of The Belo Medical Group
- Jojie Lloren – Former President of the Young Designers Guild and The Fashion and Design Council of the Philippines
- Sheila Romero – Vice Chairman of Philippines AirAsia

== Contestants ==
Delegates:

Province/City	Contestant	Age (Note: Ages at the time of the pageant)
Aklan	Christelle Abello	27
Albay	Janela Joy Cuaton	24
Angeles	Mirjan Hipolito	24
Antique	Noelyn Rose Campos	23
Bukidnon	Megan Julia Digal	25
Cagayan de Oro	Vincy Vacalares	24
Cavite	Victoria Velasquez Vincent	26
Cebu	Steffi Aberasturi	27
Cebu City	Beatrice Gomez	26
Davao del Sur	Jedidah Korinihona	24
Davao Occidental	Krizzaleen Mae Valencia	28
Iloilo City	Kheshapornam Ramachandran	20
Isabela	Jan Louise Abejero	26
Laguna	Leren Bautista	28
Makati	Isabelle de los Santos	25
Mandaluyong	Maria Corazon Abalos	23
Manila	Izabella Jasmine Umali	25
Marinduque	Simone Nadine Bornilla	18
Masbate	Kisses Delavin	22
Misamis Oriental	Chella Grace Falconer	21
Negros Oriental	Grace Charmaine Vendiola	26
Pangasinan	Maureen Wroblewitz	23
Parañaque	Maria Ingrid Teresita Santamaria	25
Pasig	Princess Kristha Singh	27
Romblon	Jane Nicole Miñano	21
San Juan	Rousanne Marie Bernos	27
Siargao	Michele Angela Okol	20
Taguig	Katrina Dimaranan	28

== Notes ==
=== Withdrawals ===
- Joanna Marie Rabe of Zambales – On September 13, 2021, Rabe withdrew from the competition after contracting dengue fever.
- Ybonne Ortega of Davao City – On September 19, 2021, Ortega withdrew from the competition after testing positive for COVID-19.
