= Miss Universe Philippines =

National beauty pageant in the Philippines

- Type: Women's beauty pageant
- Franchise holder: Empire Philippines
- Headquarters: Bonifacio Global City, Taguig, Philippines
- Country represented: Philippines
- Qualifies for: Miss Universe
- First edition: 2020
- Most recent edition: 2026
- Current titleholder: Bea Millan-Windorski; La Union
- President and CEO: Jonas Gaffud
- National Director: Ariella Arida
- Director of Communications: Voltaire Tayag
- Language: Filipino; English
- Predecessor: Binibining Pilipinas

Miss Universe Philippines (commonly abbreviated as MUPH) is an annual national beauty pageant run by the organization of the same name under Empire Philippines. The pageant selects the official representative to Miss Universe—one of the Big Four beauty pageants. Through its sister organization, The Miss Philippines, the pageant also names competitors to several other beauty pageants.

The reigning Miss Universe Philippines is Bea Millan-Windorski of La Union, who was crowned on May 2, 2026, in Pasay, Philippines.

== History ==
From 1964 to 2019, Binibining Pilipinas held the national franchise for Miss Universe, wherein it was responsible for selecting Filipinas to represent the Philippines and compete at the annual Miss Universe pageant. Under Binibining Pilipinas, the Philippine representatives to the Miss Universe pageant were crowned with the title of Binibining Pilipinas from 1964 to 1971, and Binibining Pilipinas Universe from 1974 to 2011. In 2012, the franchise renamed the Binibining Pilipinas Universe title to Miss Universe Philippines. The title was first used at Binibining Pilipinas 2012.

In December 2019, the Miss Universe Organization granted the Philippine franchise to a new organizing body led by Binibining Pilipinas Universe 2011 and Miss Universe 2011 third runner-up Shamcey Supsup-Lee as national director, and Binibining Pilipinas Universe 2006 Lia Ramos as Women Empowerment Chair. The creation of the new Miss Universe Philippines Organization formed a separate, standalone pageant responsible for the selection of the Philippine delegate to the Miss Universe pageant. Since 2024, the pageant's offshoot organization The Miss Philippines has selected contestants from main competition to compete in several other beauty pageants.

In February 2025, Ariella Arida, Miss Universe Philippines 2013 succeeded Supsup-Lee as national director after the latter launched a bid for councilor in the 2025 Pasig local elections. The pageant announced that Arida's role as national director will emphasize the training and development of its competitors.

== Contestant selection ==
From the 2020 to 2023, candidates for the competition were recruited through a process of application and subsequent screening. At the same time, local pageants affiliated with the pageant were given the right to nominate delegates to the pageant. In 2021 and 2022, the organization partnered with the Philippine social networking app Kumu in determining the final entrants from longlisted candidates through online contests. In April 2023, the Miss Universe Philippines introduced the Accredited Partners Program, allowing local pageants to access MUPH branded merchandising.

The organization abolished the application process in 2024, after which all delegates would be coming from the accredited partners of the pageant, whether through a local pageant or appointment. The national director Shamcey Supsup-Lee, explained the change intended to "even the playing field" between delegates in Metro Manila and "in the provinces" by ensuring that delegates to the competition were supported by local organizations. That same year, competitors representing Overseas Filipino Communities were sent for the first time. The following year, diaspora competitors were required to represent a Philippine locality at the same time.

== Crowns ==
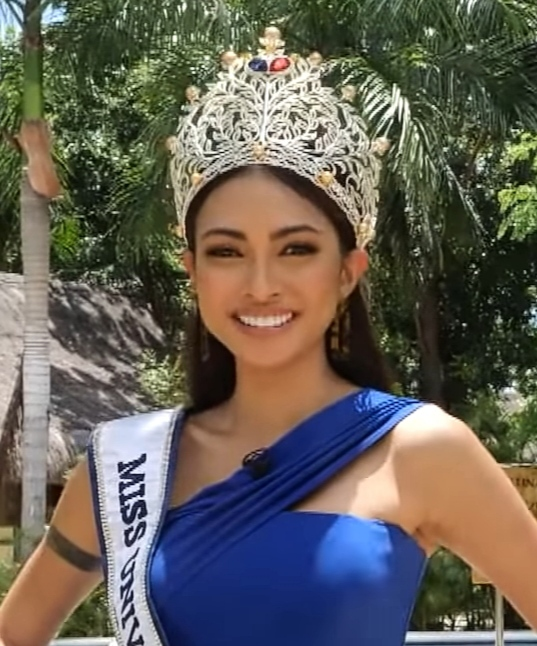
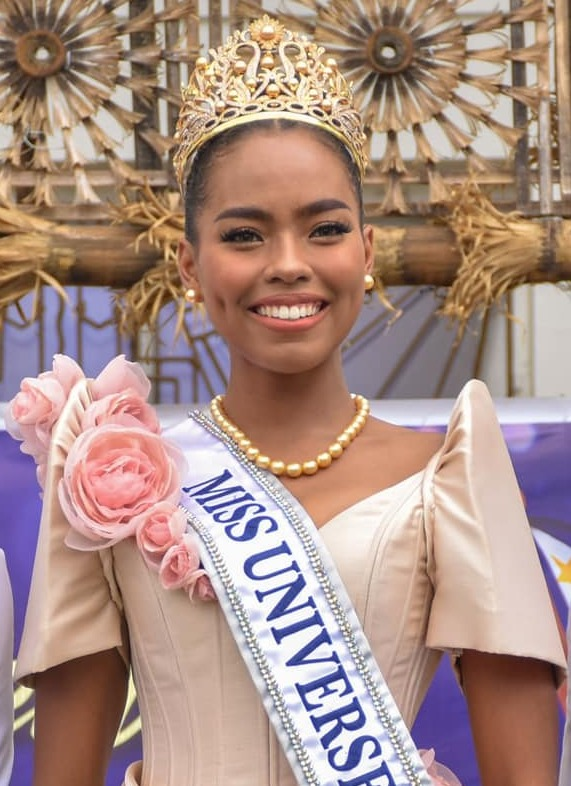
The Filipina crown, as worn by Miss Universe Philippines 2021, Beatrice Gomez (left) and the La Mer en Majesté crown, as worn by Miss Universe Philippines 2024, Chelsea Manalo (right)
- Filipina (2020–2021) — Named for the feminine form of Filipino, the crown was crafted by the Villarica family jewelers of Bulacan. According to the designers, the elements of the crown represent the "qualities, aspirations, values, and symbols of the Filipino people". The swirl of leaves represents every woman who aims for success in "different forms" but still keeps "the Filipino values in their hearts"; diamond embedded in each leaf signifies "the sparkle" in the lives of people that each woman encounters; golden South Sea pearls represent four values of creativity, intelligence, optimism, and fear of God; sapphire, ruby, and topaz were patterned after the blue, red, and yellow colors of the flag of the Philippines. The crown has an estimated value of ₱5 million (nearly $100,000).
- La Mer en Majesté (2022–present) — The name translates to "The Sea in Majesty". According to the organization, as the crown pays homage to the sea for "she is the queen of the elements". Embedded in the crown are golden South Sea Pearls, the national gem of the Philippines, which represents "a radiant symbol of the harmonious relationship between man and nature, capturing the very spirit of the Filipinos". The crown was crafted by the French and Filipino fine jewelry brand Jewelmer.

== Titleholders ==
Legend

- Declared as the winner
- Finished as a runner-up
- Finished as one of the finalists or semifinalists

Year	Represented	Miss Universe Philippines	Hometown	Age (Note: Ages at the time of Miss Universe)	Placement	Special award(s)	Ref.
2020	Iloilo City	Rabiya Mateo	Balasan	24	Top 21	None	
2021	Cebu City	Beatrice Gomez	San Fernando	26	Top 5	None	
2022	Pasay	Celeste Cortesi	Pasay	25	Unplaced	None	
2023	Makati	Michelle Dee	Makati	28	Top 10	4 Special Awards: Best National Costume; Voice For Change (Gold Winner); Spirit of Carnival Award; Fan Vote Winner	
2024	Bulacan	Chelsea Manalo	Meycauayan	25	Top 30	2 Special Awards: Miss Universe Asia; Best National Costume	
2025	Quezon	Ahtisa Manalo	Candelaria	28	3rd Runner-Up	2 Special Awards: Best National Costume; Beyond the Crown Award (Third Place)	
2026	La Union	Bea Millan-Windorski	San Juan	24			

=== Gallery of winners ===
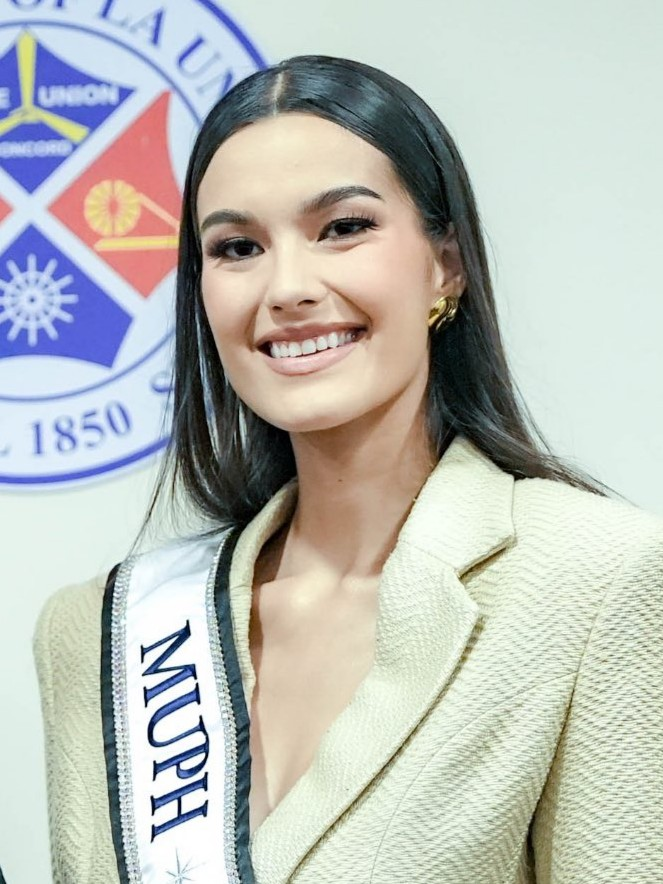
2026 Bea Millan-Windorski representing La Union

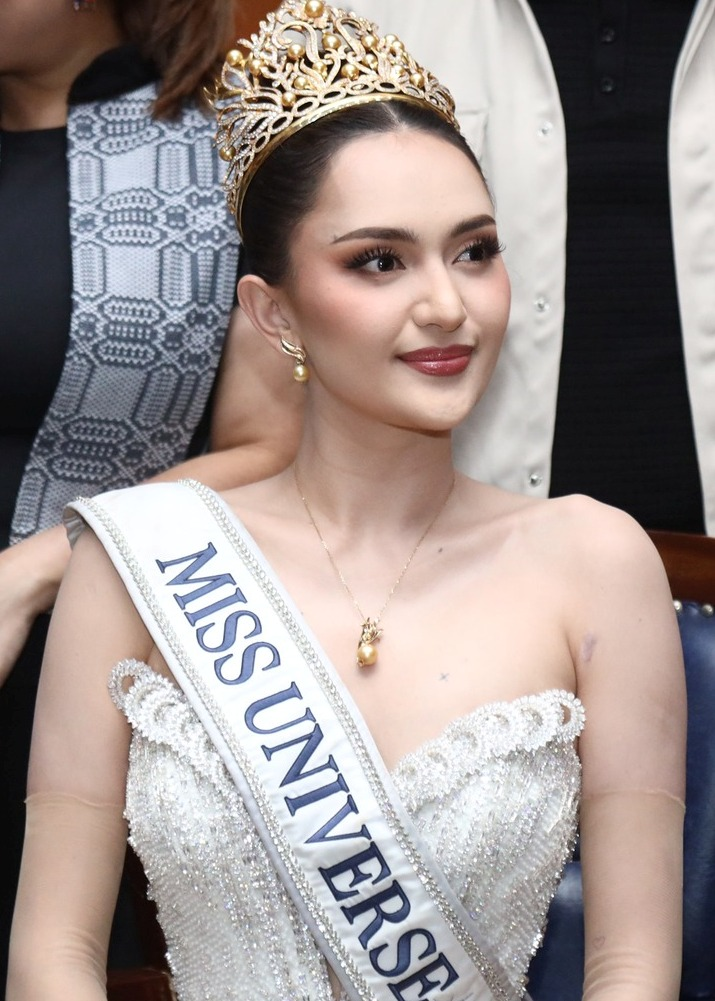
2025 Ahtisa Manalo representing Quezon

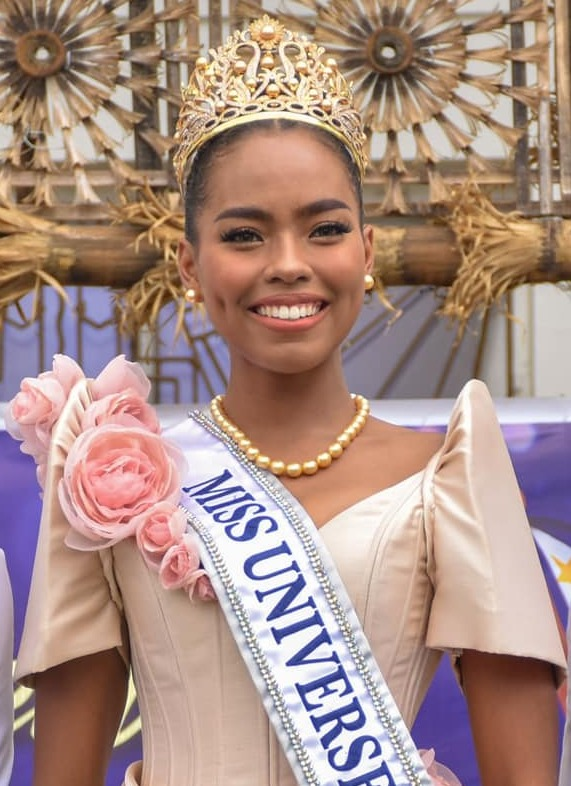
2024 Chelsea Manalo representing Bulacan

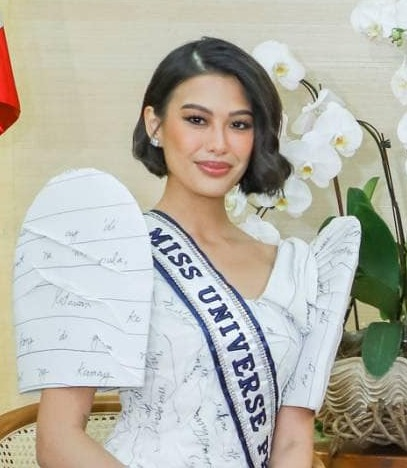
2023 Michelle Dee representing Makati

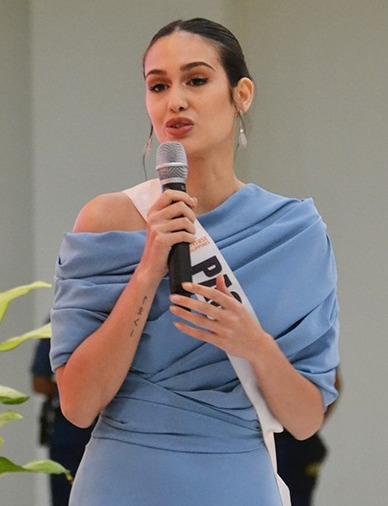
2022 Celeste Cortesi representing Pasay

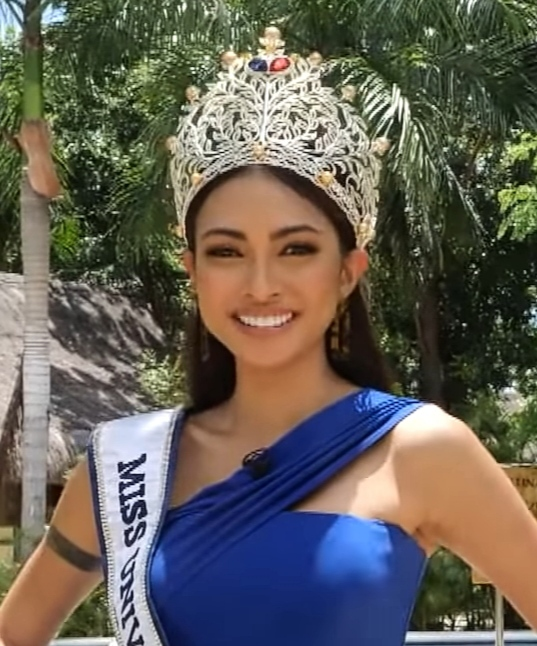
2021 Beatrice Gomez representing Cebu City

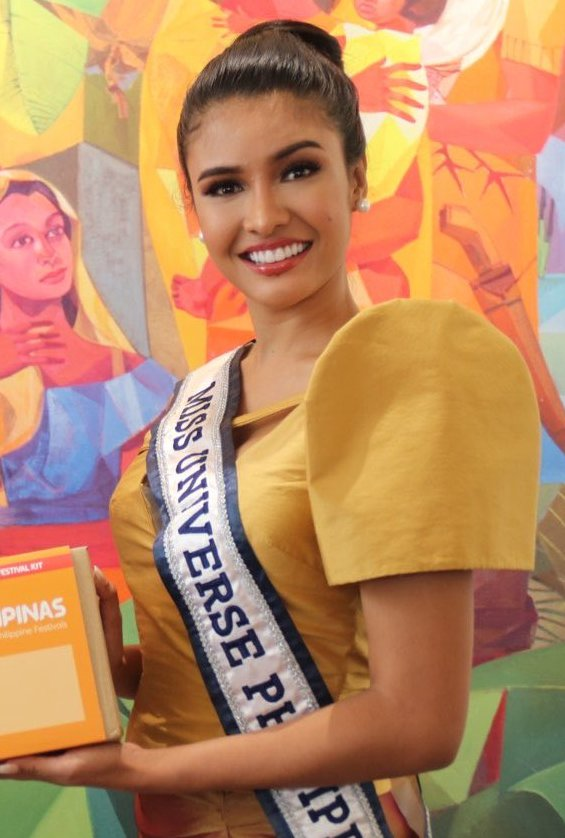
2020 Rabiya Mateo representing Iloilo City

== Reception ==
Miss Universe Philippines was awarded as Best National Host Tour Country in 2024 and Best National Pageant in 2025.

== See also ==
- Philippines at major beauty pageants
- Big Four beauty pageants
- List of beauty pageants
- Miss Universe Philippines
- Miss World Philippines
- Binibining Pilipinas
- Miss Philippines Earth
- Reina Filipinas
- The Miss Philippines
- Miss Island Philippines
- Mutya ng Pilipinas
- Miss Pearl of the Orient Philippines
- Miss Republic of the Philippines
