= Beatrice Gomez =

Filipino beauty pageant titleholder (born 1995)

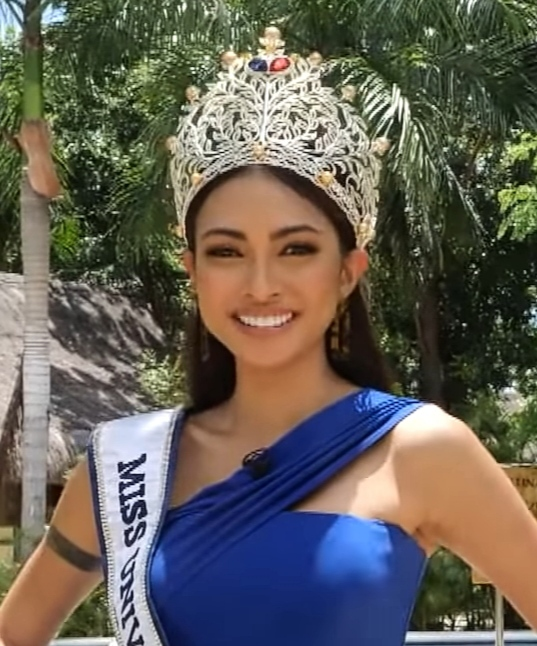
- Gomez in 2021
- Born: Beatrice Luigi Gallarde Gomez; February 23, 1995 (age 31); San Fernando, Cebu, Philippines
- Education: University of San Jose–Recoletos (Mass communication)
- Height: 1.75 m (5 ft 9 in)
- Spouse: John Odin (m. 2025)
- Beauty pageant titleholder
- Title: Binibining Cebu 2020; Miss Universe Philippines 2021
- Major competitions: Miss Universe Philippines 2021; (Winner); Miss Universe 2021; (Top 5)
- Military career
- Allegiance: Philippines
- Branch: Philippine Navy
- Rank: Sergeant

Beatrice Luigi Gallarde Gomez-Odin (Cebuano: [beaˈtɾis luwiˈdʒiʔ ˈgɔmɛs]; born February 23, 1995) is a Filipino beauty pageant titleholder who was crowned Miss Universe Philippines 2021. She is the first openly pansexual woman to be crowned Miss Universe Philippines, she represented the country at the Miss Universe 2021 pageant in Eilat, Israel, and finished as a top five finalist.

== Early life and education ==
Beatrice Luigi Gallarde Gomez was born on February 23, 1995, in San Fernando, Cebu, Philippines. She was raised by a single mother. She studied at the University of San Jose–Recoletos and pursued a degree in mass communication. At the same time, she also played varsity volleyball for the university. As a student-athlete, she was able to study under an athletic scholarship. In 2022, she graduated from the said university.

== Pageantry ==
=== Miss Mandaue 2015 ===
Gomez's first pageant was in 2015 when she placed second runner-up at the Miss Mandaue 2015 pageant.

=== Binibining Cebu 2020 ===
Gomez represented San Fernando at the Binibining Cebu 2020 pageant and won the title, succeeding Steffi Rose Aberasturi of Mandaue City. She also won the Best in Swimwear, Miss Foton, and Miss Body Worx Medical Spa awards.

=== Miss Universe Philippines 2021 ===
On September 1, 2021, representing Cebu City, Gomez was confirmed as one of the thirty delegates in the Miss Universe Philippines 2021 pageant.

During the finals on September 30, 2021, Gomez won the Best in Swimsuit, Best in Evening Gown, Miss Cream Silk, and Miss Luxxe ImmunPlus Game Changer awards. At the end of the event, Gomez was crowned by outgoing Miss Universe Philippines 2020 Rabiya Mateo as Miss Universe Philippines 2021.

With her win, Gomez became the first openly bisexual Miss Universe Philippines winner and the first to represent the country in Miss Universe.

=== Miss Universe 2021 ===
Gomez competed at the 70th Miss Universe pageant in Eilat, Israel, on December 13, 2021, becoming the last Philippine delegate to qualify to the Miss Universe semifinals during the country's longest streak of appearances in its history in the said round at 12 consecutive years (dating back from 2010). Gomez finished as a top five finalist, becoming the first openly LGBT delegate from any participatory country at Miss Universe to advance to the competition's finals, as well as the Philippines' highest placement since Miss Universe 2018. Harnaaz Sandhu of India won the said pageant.

== Military career ==
In January 2021, she completed the citizens military course training of the Philippine Army Reserve Command in Eastern Visayas which allowed her to be part of the Philippine Navy Reserve Unit, with the rank of corporal. In October 2021, Gomez was promoted to sergeant.

In May 2022, she was named as one of the honorary members, among the first batch, of the newly launched Friends of Marines, a civilian organization by the Philippine Marine Corps.

== Civic involvement and advocacy ==
Gomez is one of the founders of BEyouthfulPH, an organization that extends assistance in uplifting the lives of disempowered and disadvantaged children in different parts of the Philippines. One of the organization's programs focuses on children in conflict with the law, guiding and inspiring them to become more proactive and law-abiding Filipino citizens.

In an interview, Gomez, who is bisexual, also says she "hopes that younger LGBTQIA+ people would be free from bullying and violence:

Just like what everyone hopes for in the LGBTQIA+, I aspire for acceptance and inclusivity — especially equal rights and protection for the younger generation who oftentimes suffer from bullying and different forms of violence. They are left to fend for themselves, particularly those that are oppressed by their own parents.

Gomez also holds the presidency of the Rotary International Rotaract Club of Metro Mandaue.

== Personal life ==
Gomez is a pansexual woman. She was previously in a relationship with disc jockey and entrepreneur Kate Jagdon. In 2025, Gomez married musician John Odin.

Gomez also does boxing, scuba diving, and mixed martial arts.

Gomez is first cousin to Rizzini Alexis Gomez, Miss Tourism International 2012–2013 and niece of former Philippine Basketball Association player Roel Gomez.

Awards and achievements
Preceded by (India) Adline Castelino (3rd Runner-Up) (Dominican Republic) Kimberly Jiménez (4th Runner-Up)	Miss Universe Top 5 Finalist (with (Colombia) Valeria Ayos); 2021	Succeeded by (Curaçao) Gabriëla Dos Santos (Puerto Rico) Ashley Cariño (Top 5)
Preceded by Rabiya Mateo (Iloilo City)	Miss Universe Philippines; 2021	Succeeded by Celeste Cortesi (Pasay)
