= List of Miss Eco International titleholders =

List of Miss Eco International winners (2015–present)

The following is a list of Miss Eco International titleholders from the competition's inaugural edition in 2015 to present.

== List of Miss Eco International titleholders ==
Edition	Country	Titleholder	National title	Pageant location	Date	Entrants
1st	Slovenia	Patricia Peklar	Miss Eco Slovenia 2015	Alexandria, Egypt	April 5, 2015	9
2nd	Costa Rica	Natalia Carvajal Sánchez	Miss Eco Costa Rica 2016	Giza, Egypt	April 14, 2016	54
3rd	Canada	Amber Lynn Bernachi	Miss Eco Canada 2017	Sharm El Sheikh, Egypt	April 14, 2017	56
4th	Philippines	Cynthia Magpatoc Thomalla	Miss Eco Philippines 2018	Cairo, Egypt	April 27, 2018	52
5th	Malaysia	Amy Nur Tinie (Note: Originally crowned 4th Runner-Up. Took over title 1st runner-up declined and the original winner dethroned.)	Miss Eco Malaysia 2019	Cairo, Egypt	March 25, 2019	54
No competition held due to the COVID-19 pandemic
6th	South Africa	Gizzelle Mandy Uys	Miss Eco South Africa 2021	Sharm El Sheikh, Egypt	April 4, 2021	39
7th	Philippines	Kathleen Joy Paton	Miss Eco Philippines 2022	Luxor, Egypt	March 18, 2022	40
8th	Vietnam	Nguyễn Thanh Hà	Miss Environment Vietnam 2022	Cairo, Egypt	March 3, 2023	40
9th	Ukraine	Angelina Usanova	Miss Eco Ukraine 2024	Cairo, Egypt	April 28, 2024	42
10th	Philippines	Alexie Mae Caimoso Brooks	Miss Eco Philippines 2025	Alexandria, Egypt	April 29, 2025	38
11th	Mexico	Palmira Ariannda Ruiz Vigueras	Miss Eco Mexico 2026	Alexandria, Egypt	May 22, 2026	45

== Countries by number of wins ==
Country or territory	Titles	Year(s)
Philippines	3	2018, 2022, 2025
Mexico	1	2026
Ukraine	1	2024
Vietnam	1	2023
South Africa	1	2021
Peru (Note: Dethroned during her reign due to pregnancy.) (Dethroned)	1	2019
Malaysia (Note: Assumed as the Miss Eco International 2019 after Peru's dethronement and 1st Runner-up, Philippines declined the title.) (Assumed)	1	2019
Canada	1	2017
Costa Rica	1	2016
Slovenia	1	2015

== Winner's gallery ==
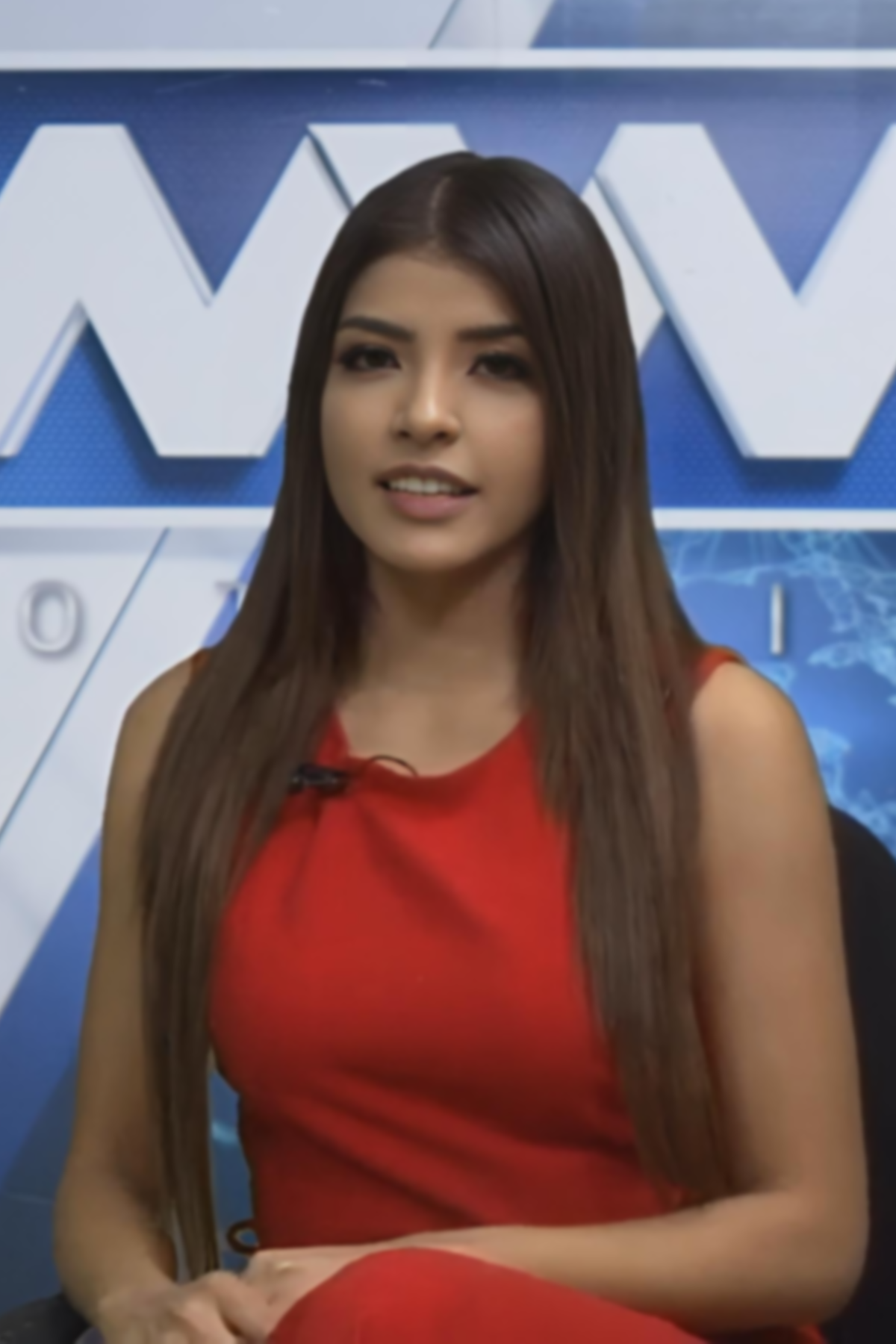
Miss Eco International 2026
Palmira Ruiz
Mexico

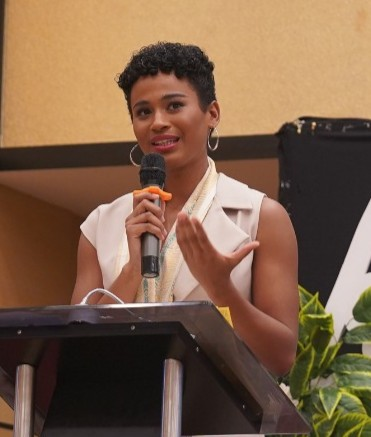
Miss Eco International 2025
Alexie Brooks
Philippines

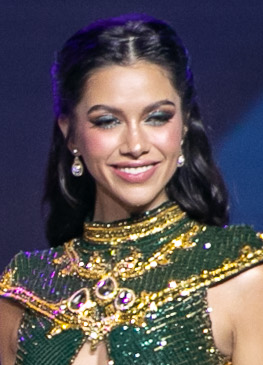
Miss Eco International 2022
Kathleen Joy Paton
Philippines

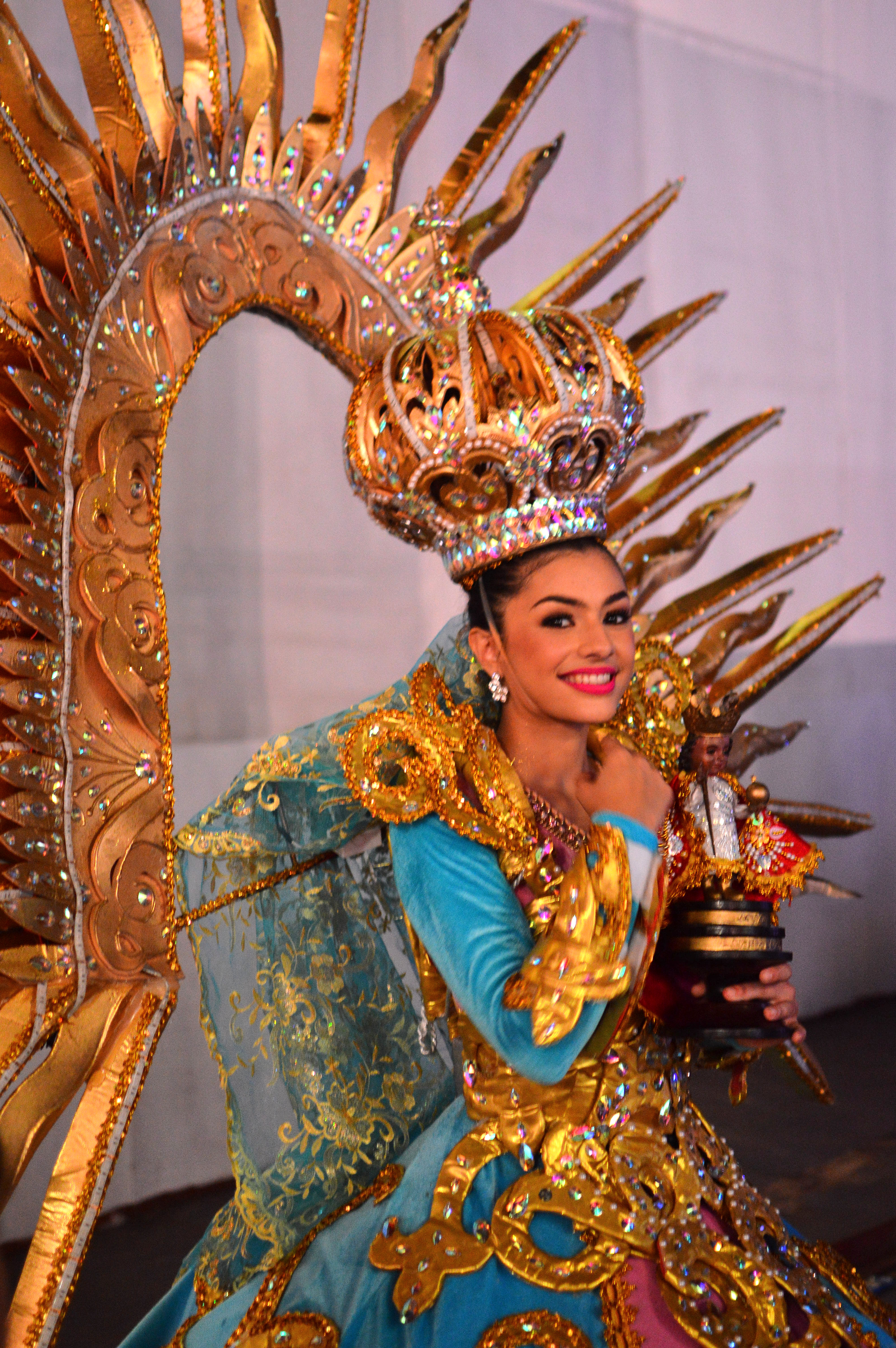
Miss Eco International 2018
Cynthia Thomalla
Philippines

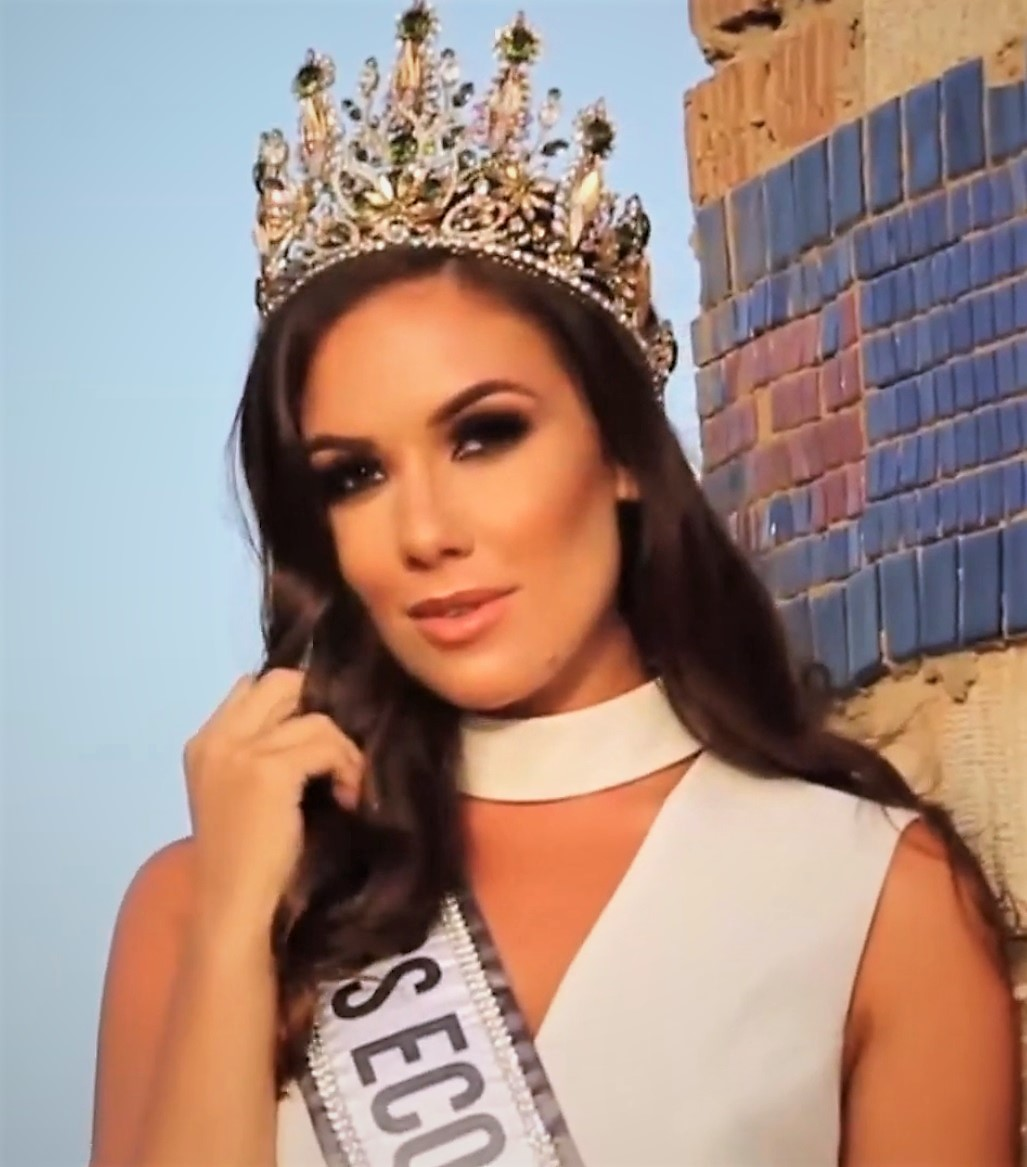
Miss Eco International 2017
Amber Bernachi
Canada

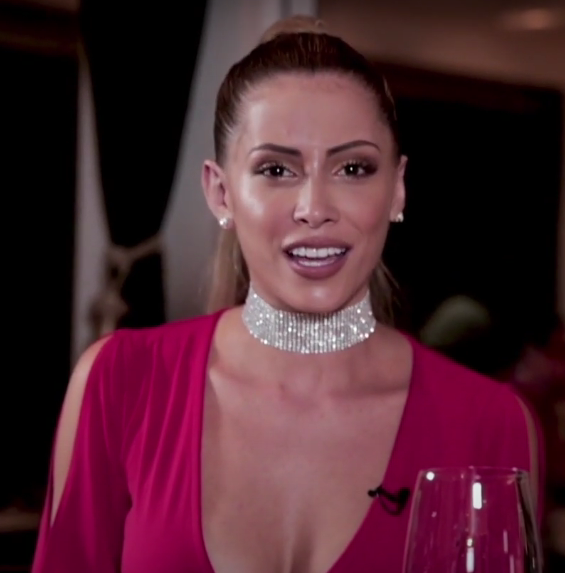
Miss Eco Universe 2016
Natalia Carvajal
Costa Rica

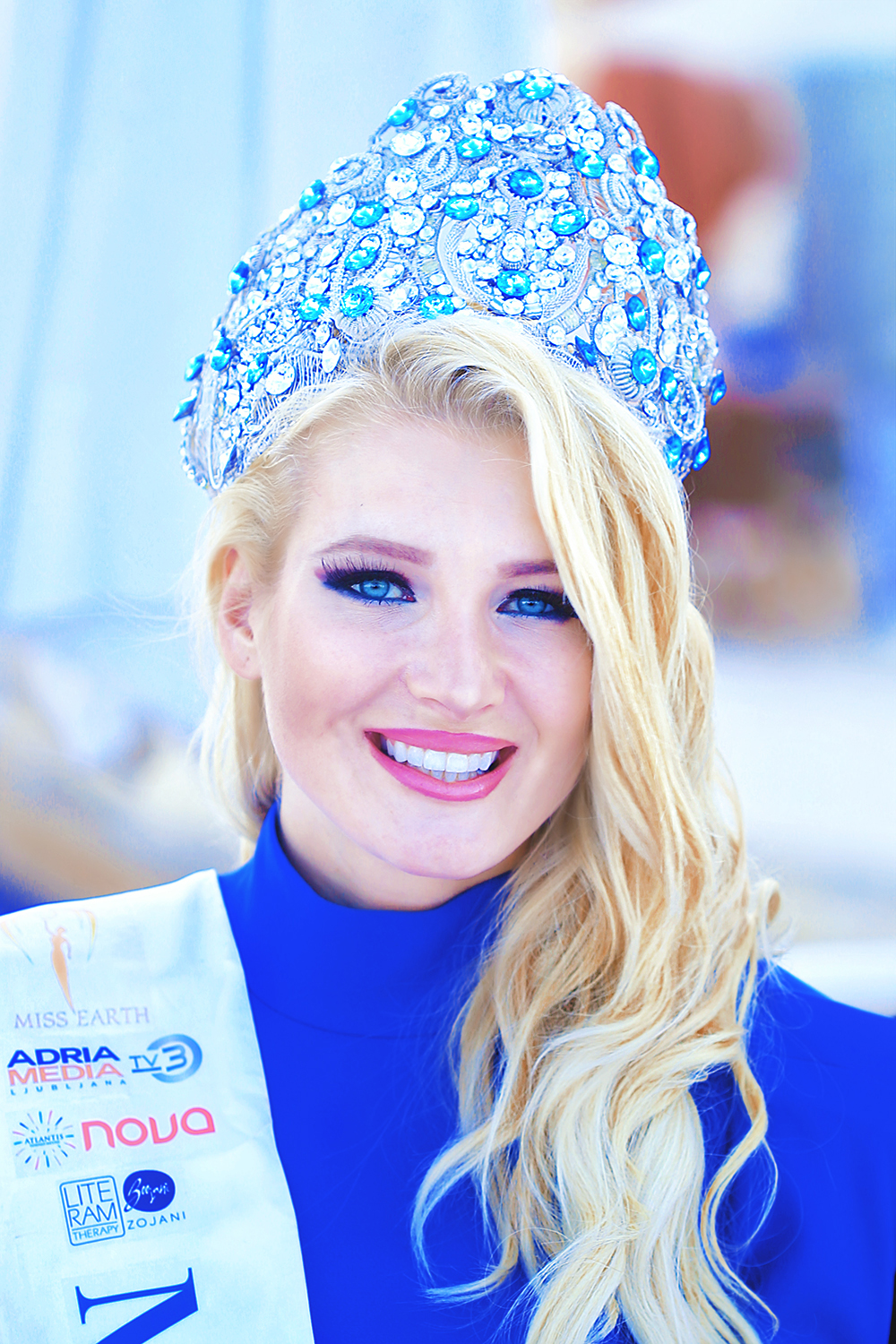
Miss Eco Queen 2015
Patricia Peklar
Slovenia
