= Dancing with the Stars (Costa Rican TV series) =

- Genre: Reality competition
- Based on: Strictly Come Dancing
- Presented by: Randall Vargas; Shirley Álvarez
- Judges: Silvia Baltodano; David Martínez; Alex Costa; César Melendez (2014–2015); Flor Urbina (2014–2019)
- Country of origin: Costa Rica
- Original language: Spanish
- No. of seasons: 7
- No. of episodes: 85

Production
- Producer: Vivian Peraza
- Running time: 120 minutes
- Production company: Marco Picado Studio (2014–present)

Original release
- Network: Teletica
- Release: 24 August 2014 – present

Dancing with the Stars is a Costa Rican dance reality show which premiered on August 24, 2014 on Teletica. The show is the Costa Rican version of the British television series Strictly Come Dancing. The program is presented by Randall Vargas, alongside Shirley Álvarez, who is the co-host. Boris Sossa was a co-host in season 2. Mauricio Hoffamn was a co-host in season 3. Bismarck Méndez co-hosted seasons 4 and 5. Natalia Carvajal was the co-host in season 6 of the program.

Costa Rica became the 49th country to adapt the format and the second in Central America after Panama. In February 2014, the BBC's purchase of the program format from Teletica was announced.

The format of the program consists of couples formed by a celebrity with a professional dancer. Each couple performs predetermined dances and competes against the others for the judges' scores and the audience's votes. The couple that receives the lowest combined score from the jury scores and the public votes is eliminated each week until one couple is crowned champion.

== Cast ==
=== Presenters ===
Randall Vargas and Shirley Álvarez have been the presenters since the show's premiere in 2014. Along with them, in season 2, Boris Sosa joined the backstage host. He was replaced by Mauricio Hoffman in season 3, who was then replaced by Bismarck Méndez, season 3's runner-up, in seasons 4 and 5. Starting in season 6, he was managed by Natalia Carvajal.

=== Judges ===
The regular judges are David Martínez, who serves as head judge, Flor Urbina who was replaced by Silvia Baltodano in season 7, and Álex Costa. Actor and singer César Meléndez (†) served as a judge in seasons 1 and 2 (2014–15).

Actor and comedian Álex Costa, who was the winner of season 1, permanently joined the judging panel from season 3, due to Meléndez's deteriorating health (and subsequent death).

During a season 5 gala (2018), the prestigious Spanish dancer Isaac Rovira joined the roster as a guest judge. In gala 4 of season 6 (2019), the winner of the fourth season (2017), presenter Víctor Carvajal, served as the third judge, due to the absence of Álex Costa.

=== Cast timeline ===
Color key:

Presenter	Co-presenter	Backstage	Judge	Contestant	Guest judge

Cast member	Seasons						
Cast member	1	2	3	4	5	6	7
Randall Vargas							
Shirley Álvarez							
Natalia Carvajal							
Natalia Rodríguez							
María González							
Boris Sosa							
Mauricio Hoffman							
Bismarck Méndez							
Flor Urbina							
David Martínez							
Álex Costa							
César Melendez (†)							
Isaac Rovira							
Silvia Baltodano							

=== Couples ===
A total of 70 celebrities have appeared in the 7 seasons of the show. For each season, celebrities are paired with a professional partner who instructs them in the different dances each week and competes alongside them in the televised competition. A total of 20 professional dancers have appeared alongside celebrities, some for just one season.

Color key:

Won the season
Second place in the season
Third place in the season

Last place in the season
Withdrew during the season

Professional dancer	Season						
Professional dancer	1	2	3	4	5	6	7
Alhanna Morales	Álex Costa	Maynor Solano	Álvaro Mesén	Gustavo Gamboa	Pablo Rodríguez	Johnny López	Mauricio Hoffmann
Yessenia Reyes	Pedro Capmany	Renzo Rímolo	Bismarck Méndez	Daniel Carvajal	Gustavo Peláez	Dany "Destino"	Víctor Núñez
Lucía Jiménez		Mauricio Montero	Daniel Vargas	S. Fitzgerald Haney	Jara Jecsinior	Greivin Morgan	Joaquín Yglesias
Diana de la O	Rogelio Royes	Michael Bleak		Víctor Carvajal			
Kevin Vera					Johanna Solano	Coco Vargas	Gabriela Jiménez
Javier Acuña		Victoria Fuentes	Karina Ramos	Marcela Ugalde	Viviana Calderón	Sofía Chaverri	Nicole Aldana
Michael Rubí		Doris Goldewight	Jalé Berahimi	Sophía Rodríguez	Keyla Sánchez	Sharon Segura	Lorna Cepeda
David Hernández	Lorena Velázquez		Glenda Peraza	Johanna Ortiz			
David Hernández	Marcela Negrini		Glenda Peraza	Johanna Ortiz			
Roberto González	Maureen Salguero	Charlene Stewart					
Ronald Hidalgo	Alejandra González						
Angélica Gamboa	Rafael Calderón	Don Stockwell	Daniel del Barco				José Miguel Cruz
Fiorella Sanchéz	Alonso Solís						
Billy Corado	Marisol Soto	Monserrat del Castillo		Adriana Durán	Amanda Moncada	Fabiana Granados	
Diego Flores	Lorena Velázquez		Gabriela Traña				
Brenda Jiménez			Gustavo Rojas				
Steven Gómez		María González	Alejandra Portillo				
Tatiana Sánchez				Harold Wallace	Oscar López	Marko Jara	
Jahzeel Acevedo					Wesley Vargas	Jair Cruz	Bryan Ganoza
Erick Vásquez				Natalia Carvajal	Yokasta Valle	Andrea Morales	Kimberly Loaiza
Andrés Fernández							Melissa Diakova

== Season specifications ==
Season	No. of		Duration dates	Couples in the final		
Season	Stars	Weeks	Duration dates	First place	Second place	Third place
1	10	12	August 24 — November 9, 2014	Álex Costa & Alhanna Morales	Pedro Capmany & Yessenia Reyes	Lorena Velázquez & David Hernández
2	10	12	September 13 — November 29, 2015	Renzo Rímolo & Yessenia Reyes	Mauricio Montero & Lucía Jiménez	Montserrat del Castillo & Billy Corado
3	10	12	September 11 — November 26, 2016	Daniel Vargas & Lucía Jiménez	Bismarck Méndez & Yessenia Reyes	Jalé Berahimi & Michael Rubí
4	10	12	September 10 — November 26, 2017	Víctor Carvajal & Diana de la O	S. Fitzgerald Haney & Lucía Jiménez	Sophia Rodríguez & Michael Rubí
5	10	12	September 9 — November 25, 2018	Johanna Solano & Kevin Vera	Keyla Sánchez & Michael Rubí	Gustavo Pelaéz & Yessenia Reyes
6	10	12	August 25 — November 10, 2019	Sofía Chaverri & Javier Acuña	Greivin Morgan & Lucía Jiménez	Marko Jara & Tatiana Sánchez
7	10	13	June 26 — September 25, 2022	Lorna Cepeda & Michael Rubí	Kimberly Loaiza & Erick Vázquez	Mauricio Hoffmann & Alhanna Morales

== Seasons ==
=== Season 1 (2014) ===
This first edition began on August 24 and ended on November 9, 2014. This year, 10 celebrities participated, paired with professional dancers. Randall Vargas and Shirley Álvarez were the host and co-host, respectively. The judges were: musician, actress, dancer, and choreographer Flor Urbina; dancer, choreographer, and dance teacher David Martínez; and actor and singer César Melendez.

During the show, Marcela Negriniii withdrew from the competition for health reasons. Chef Lorena Velázquez, who had been the first contestant to be eliminated, returned to the competition in her place.

The contestants of the first season were:

Celebrity	Notability	Professional partner	Status
Lorena Velázquez	Chef	Diego Flores	1st Eliminated
Rogelio Royes	Singer	Diana de la O	2nd Eliminated
Marisol Soto	TV presenter	Billy Corado	3rd Eliminated
Marcela Negrini	Model & businesswoman	David Hernández	Withdrew
Alonso Solís	Former soccer player & singer	Fiorella Sanchéz	4th Eliminated
Rafael Calderón	Chef	Angélica Gamboa	5th Eliminated
Alejandra González	TV presenter	Ronald Hidalgo	6th Eliminated
Maureen Salguero	TV and radio presenter & actress	Roberto González	7th Eliminated
Lorena Velázquez	Chef	David Hernández	Third place
Pedro Capmany	Singer-songwriter	Yessenia Reyes	Second place
Álex Costa	Comedian & actor	Alhanna Morales	Winners

=== Season 2 (2015) ===
This second edition began on September 13 and ended on November 29, 2015. This year, 10 celebrities competed alongside professional dancers. Randall Vargas and Shirley Álvarez returned as presenters, and Boris Sossa joined the show backstage. The judges from the previous edition returned.

The contestants of the second season were:

Celebrity	Notability	Professional partner	Status
María González	TV presenter & model	Steven Gómez	1st Eliminated
Michael Bleak	Rancher & businessman	Diana de la O	2nd Eliminated
Victoria Fuentes	Journalist	Javier Acuña	3rd Eliminated
Charlene Stewart	Singer	Roberto González	4th Eliminated
Doris Goldewight	Chef	Michael Rubí	5th Eliminated
Don Stockwell	Artistic entrepreneur	Angélica Gamboa	6th Eliminated
Maynor Solano	Sports journalist	Alhanna Morales	7th Eliminated
Monserrat del Castillo	Model & TV presenter	Billy Corado	Third place
Mauricio Montero	Former soccer player	Lucía Jiménez	Second place
Renzo Rímolo	Comedian	Yessenia Reyes	Winners

=== Season 3 (2016) ===
The third season began on September 11 and ended on November 26, 2016. This season featured 10 celebrities paired with professional dancers. Randall Vargas and Shirley Álvarez returned as hosts, with Mauricio Hoffman in charge of backstage. Flor Urbina and David Martínez returned as judges. Actor and comedian Álex Costa, the season 1 winner, joined the judging panel.

The contestants of the third season were:

Celebrity	Notability	Professional partner	Status
Alejandra Portillo	Actress	Steven Gómez	1st Eliminated
Gustavo Rojas	Actor & TV presenter	Brenda Jiménez	2nd Eliminated
Álvaro Mesén	Former soccer player	Alhanna Morales	3rd Eliminated
Daniel del Barco	Shoe designer	Angélica Gamboa	4th Eliminated
Gabriela Traña	Athlete	Diego Torres	5th Eliminated
Glenda Peraza	TV presenter & model	David Hernández	6th Eliminated
Karina Ramos	Model & Miss Costa Rica 2014	Javier Acuña	7th Eliminated
Jalé Berahimi	TV presenter & businesswoman	Michael Rubí	Third place
Bismarck Méndez	TV presenter & actor	Yessenia Reyes	Second place
Daniel Vargas	Chef	Lucía Jiménez	Winners

=== Season 4 (2017) ===
The fourth edition began on September 10 and ended on November 26, 2017. This year's show featured 10 celebrities paired with professional dancers. Randall Vargas and Shirley Álvarez returned as hosts, with Bismarck Méndez in charge of backstage management. Flor Urbina, David Martínez, and Álex Costa returned as judges.

The contestants of the fourth season were:

Celebrity	Notability	Professional partner	Status
Harold Wallace	Former soccer player	Tatiana Sánchez	1st Eliminated
Adriana Durán	Journalist & TV presenter	Billy Corado	2nd Eliminated
Natalia Carvajal	TV host & Miss Costa Rica 2018	Erik Vasquéz	3rd Eliminated
Johanna Ortiz	TV presenter & model	David Hernández	4th Eliminated
Gustavo Gamboa	Announcer	Alhanna Morales	5th Eliminated
Marcela Ugalde	Actress	Javier Acuña	6th Eliminated
Daniel Carvajal	Model & Veteran	Yessenia Reyes	7th Eliminated
Sophia Rodríguez	Chef	Michael Rubí	Third place
Stafford Fitzgerald Haney	Former United States Ambassador	Lucía Jiménez	Second place
Víctor Carvajal	TV presenter	Diana de la O	Winners

=== Season 5 (2018) ===
The fifth edition began on September 9 and concluded on November 25, 2018. This edition featured 10 celebrities paired with professional dancers. Randall Vargas and Shirley Álvarez returned as hosts, while Bismarck Méndez continued to host the backstage. The judges were the same as the previous edition. The first female champion in the show's history was also crowned.

The contestants of the fifth season were:

Celebrity	Notability	Professional partner	Status
Wesley Vargas	TV personality	Jahzeel Acevedo	1st Eliminated
Amanda Moncada	Dressmaker	Billy Corado	2nd Eliminated
Pablo Rodríguez	Actor	Alhanna Morales	3rd Eliminated
Yokasta Valle	Female boxer	Erick Vázquez	4th Eliminated
Oscar López	Politician	Tatiana Sánchez	5th Eliminated
Viviana Calderón	TV presenter & actress	Javier Acuña	6th Eliminated
Jecsinior Jara	Singer	Lucía Jiménez	7th Eliminated
Gustavo Peláez	Announcer & comedian	Yessenia Reyes	Third place
Keyla Sánchez	TV presenter & announcer	Michael Rubí	Second place
Johanna Solano	Model & Miss Costa Rica 2011	Kevin Vera	Winners

=== Season 6 (2019) ===
The sixth edition began on August 25, 2019. This edition consisted of 10 celebrities paired with professional dancers. Randall Vargas and Shirley Álvarez returned as hosts, and backstage was hosted by Natalia Carvajal and Natalia Rodríguez.

The contestants of the sixth season were:

Celebrity	Notability	Professional partner	Status
Andrea Morales	Politician & lawyer	Erick Vásquez	1st Eliminated
Silvia "Coco" Vargas	Influencer & vlogger	Kevin Vera	2nd Eliminated
Jair Cruz	Announcer	Jahzeel Acevedo	3rd Eliminated
Fabiana Granados Herrera	Miss Costa Rica 2013 & businesswoman	Billy Corado	4th Eliminated
Johnny López	Presenter & journalist	Alhanna Morales	5th Eliminated
Dany Pérez (Destino)	Influencer	Yessenia Reyes	6th Eliminated
Sharon Segura	Modelo & presenter	Michael Rubí	7th Eliminated
Marko Jara	Singer & veteran	Tatiana Sánchez	Third place
Greivin Morgan	Model	Lucía Jiménez	Second place
Sofía Chaverri	Actress	Javier Acuña	Winners

=== Season 7 (2022) ===
The seventh edition began on June 26, 2022. This year's show features 10 celebrities paired with professional dancers. Randall Vargas and Shirley Álvarez returned as hosts, and María González and Natalia Rodríguez are in charge of backstage hosting.

The participants of this season are:

Celebrity	Notability	Professional partner	Status
Melissa Diakova	Film director, actress and athlete	Andrés Fernández	1st Eliminated
José Miguel Cruz	Journalist	Angélica Gamboa	2nd Eliminated
Gabriela Jiménez	Journalist	Kevin Vera	3rd Eliminated
Bryan Ganoza	Model and singer	Jahzeel Acevedo	4th Eliminated
Nicole Aldana	Model and businesswoman	Javier Acuña	5th Eliminated
Víctor Núñez	Footballer	Yessenia Reyes	6th Eliminated
Joaquín Yglesias	Singer	Lucía Jiménez	7th Eliminated
Mauricio Hoffmann	TV presenter	Alhana Morales	Third place
Kimberly Loaiza	Model and TV presenter	Erick Vázquez	Second place
Lorna Cepeda	Actress	Michael Rubí	Winners
