= Verónica Salas =

Mexican model and beauty pageant titleholder

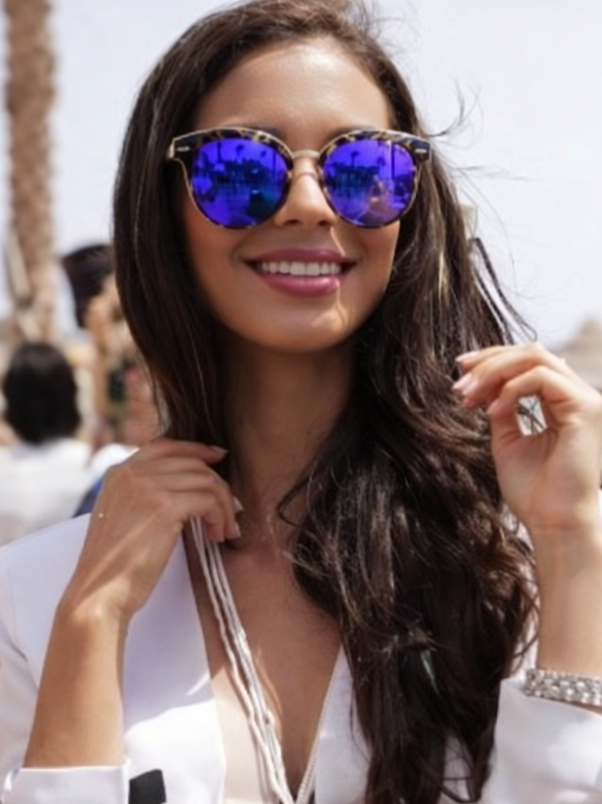
- Salas in 2017
- Born: Verónica Salas Vallejo; December 1, 1993 (age 32); Tejupilco, State of Mexico, Mexico
- Education: Universidad Interamericana para el Desarrollo
- Height: 1.75 m (5 ft 9 in)
- Beauty pageant titleholder
- Hair color: Black
- Eye color: Brown
- Major competitions: Miss Earth México 2016 (Miss Earth-Water); Miss Eco International 2017 (Top 20); Miss Intercontinental 2017 (Winner)

Verónica Salas Vallejo is a Mexican model and beauty pageant titleholder who was the first Mexican to win Miss Intercontinental.

== Early life and education ==
Salas was born in Tejupilco, State of Mexico. At 17 years old, she faced a major hurdle when her parents told her they lacked the financial resources to support her continued education. Undeterred, Salas persevered and fought for her goals, eventually earning a degree in Physical Education and Sports from the Universidad Interamericana para el Desarrollo (UNID).

== Pageantry ==
Salas began her pageantry career in regional competitions for the State of Mexico. In 2016, she participated in Miss Earth Mexico representing Estado de México where she obtained the title of Miss Earth-Water. Therefore, it was up to her to represent Mexico in the Miss Eco International pageant held at the Maritim Jolie Ville International Convention Center, Sharm el-Sheikh, Egypt, on April 14, 2017, where she placed among the Top 20.

The following year, Salas represented Mexico in the Miss Intercontinental pageant held at the Sunrise Crystal Bay Resort, Hurghada, Egypt, on January 24, 2018, where she was crowned Miss Intercontinental 2017 by outgoing titleholder Heilymar Rosario Velázquez of Puerto Rico. Salas became the first Mexican to win the Miss Intercontinental crown in the pageant's 46-year history.

Awards and achievements
Preceded by (Puerto Rico) Heilymar Rosario Velázquez	Miss Intercontinental; 2017	Succeeded by (Philippines) Karen Gallman
