= Sarah Archer =

Sarah Archer may refer to:

- Sarah Archer (writer), American writer
- Sarah Archer (model) (born 1990), London-based model and actress
- Sarah Archer, character in Already Dead (film)
- Lady Sarah Archer, one of the Faro Ladies
