= Karen Gallman =

Filipino-Australian beauty queen

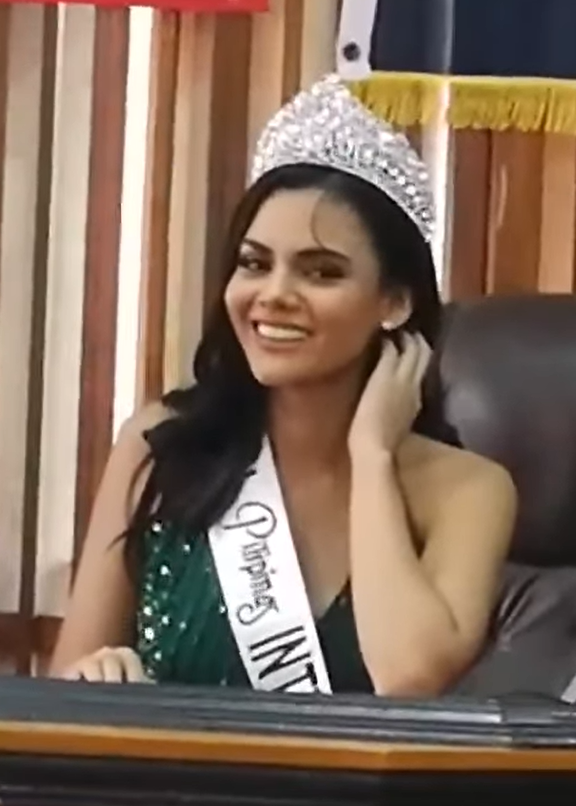
- Gallman in 2018
- Born: Karen Juanita Boyonas Gallman; September 27, 1992 (age 34); Ubay, Bohol, Philippines
- Education: Melbourne Business School; University of Queensland; Olivarez College
- Occupations: Operations Analyst; Management Consultant
- Height: 1.72 m (5 ft 8 in)
- Spouse: Ian Garton (m. 2020)
- Children: 1
- Beauty pageant titleholder
- Title: Binibining Pilipinas Intercontinental 2018; Miss Intercontinental 2018
- Years active: 2012; 2018–present
- Eye color: Brown
- Major competitions: Binibining Pilipinas 2012; (Top 12); (Miss Photogenic); Binibining Pilipinas 2018; (Winner – Binibining Pilipinas Intercontinental 2018); Miss Intercontinental 2018; (Winner)

Karen Juanita Boyonas Gallman-Garton (born September 27, 1992) is a Filipino model and beauty queen who was crowned Miss Intercontinental 2018. The first Filipina to win Miss Intercontinental, Gallman was previously crowned Binibining Pilipinas Intercontinental 2018 and competed in Binibining Pilipinas 2012, placing in the top 12 and winning Miss Photogenic.

== Early life and education ==
Karen Juanita Boyonas Gallman was born in Bohol, Philippines, to Gavin Gallman Sr., an Australian World War II veteran and Editha Boyonas, a Filipino school teacher. Speaking both Bisaya and Tagalog, Gallman and her family moved to Brisbane, Australia, in 2000. She finished her secondary education at Olivarez College. She obtained her bachelor's degree in Business Management majoring in International Business at the University of Queensland. Upon graduating, Gallman secured a graduate role with a management consulting firm in London, United Kingdom.

== Pageantry ==
=== Binibining Pilipinas 2012 ===
Gallman was a candidate at the Binibining Pilipinas 2012 competition, representing Bohol and finishing in the Top 12.

=== Binibining Pilipinas 2018 ===
Gallman competed in the Binibining Pilipinas 2018 competition held at the Araneta Coliseum in Manila, Philippines, where she was crowned Binibining Pilipinas Intercontinental 2018 by the outgoing titleholder, Katarina Rodriguez.

=== Miss Intercontinental 2018 ===
Gallman represented the Philippines in the Miss Intercontinental 2018 pageant held at the Mall of Asia Arena, Manila, on January 26, 2019, where she was crowned Miss Intercontinental 2018 by outgoing titleholder Verónica Salas Vallejo of Mexico. Competing against more than 80 other contestants, Gallman became the first Filipina to win the Miss Intercontinental crown in the pageant's 47-year history. During the final question and answer portion, all remaining contestants were asked the same question by the host: "How do you define success?" She answered:

"For me, success is not just about winning in life but setting goals, smaller goals, and achieving your dreams and working hard for everything you want, and always looking up to God and being thankful for everything. For me, that is success."

Following her victory, former president of the Philippines and then-mayor of Manila Joseph Estrada personally congratulated Gallman in a courtesy call at the Manila City Hall. She was also congratulated by Arthur C. Yap, the governor of Bohol and Constantino Reyes, the mayor of her hometown Ubay, Bohol.

== Personal life ==
On March 3, 2020, Gallman married her longtime boyfriend Ian Garton. On December 9, 2020, she gave birth to her first child.

Awards and achievements
| Preceded by (Mexico) Verónica Salas Vallejo | Miss Intercontinental; 2018 | Succeeded by (Hungary) Fanni Miko |
| Preceded by Katarina Rodriguez (Davao City) | Binibining Pilipinas Intercontinental; 2018 | Succeeded by Emma Tiglao (Pampanga) |
