= Miss Eco International 2024 =

9th edition of Miss Eco International pageant

- Date: April 28, 2024
- Hosts: Nancy Magdy
- Venue: Triump Luxury Hotel, New Cairo, Egypt
- Entrants: 42
- Placements: 21
- Debuts: Czech Republic; Taiwan; Trinidad and Tobago
- Withdrawals: Argentina; Botswana; Finland; Gabon; Italy; Cambodia; Mauritius; Pakistan; Panama; Serbia
- Returns: Aruba; United Kingdom; Canada; Colombia; Kosovo; Macedonia; France; Romania; Thailand
- Winner: Angelina Usanova; Ukraine
- Best National Costume: Chantal Schmidt (Philippines)
- Best Eco Video: Valeria Avril (Indonesia)

Miss Eco International 2024 was the ninth edition of Miss Eco International pageant, held on April 28, 2024, at the Triumph Luxury Hotel, New Cairo in Cairo, Egypt.

Nguyễn Thanh Hà of Vietnam crowned Angelina Usanova from Ukraine as her successor at the end of the event. This mark's the first victory of Ukraine at Miss Eco International pageant.

== Results ==
=== Placements ===
Placement	Contestants
Miss Eco International 2024	Ukraine — Angelina Usanova
1st Runner-up	Philippines — Chantal Schmidt §
2nd Runner-up	Canada — Nikita Dani
3rd Runner-up	Brazil — Fabiane Alcarde Goia
4th Runner-up	Indonesia — Valerie Avril ∆
Top 10	Aruba — Jaimerlee de Meza; Malaysia — Jessica Gomez; Mexico — María Lucía Ortega; United States — Sabrina Ramos; Venezuela — Valeria Medina
Top 21	Australia — Riley Aston-Kampioti; Belgium — Luna De Vlam; China — Li Xiangqi; Colombia — Stephany Silva Castrillón; Ecuador — Denisse Jaramillo; Japan — Maria Ishida; Netherlands — Kimary da Silva Carvalho; Nigeria — Vivian Kosisochukwu; Paraguay — Fabiola Martínez; Spain — Karla López Villar; Thailand — Kodchakorn Korntrakoon

∆ – Automatically advanced to the top 21 for winning Best Eco Video

§ — Automatically advanced to the top 21 for winning Best in National Costume

=== Continental Queens ===
Continental titles	Candidates
Miss Eco Africa	Egypt — Reem Elneweshy
Miss Eco America	Paraguay — Fabiola Martinez
Miss Eco Asia	Iraq — Sarah Nadeem
Miss Eco Europe	Spain — Karla López Villar
Miss Eco Oceania	Australia — Riley Aston-Kampioti

=== Special awards ===
Awarda	Candidates
Best in National Costume	Philippines — Chantal Schmidt
Best Evening Gown	Philippines — Chantal Schmidt
Best Social Media Content	United States — Sabrina Ramos
Best Eco Video	Indonesia — Valerie Avril
Best in Catwalk	Indonesia — Valerie Avril
Best in Talent	China — Li Xiangqi
People's Choice Award	Brazil — Fabiane Alcarde Goia
Best Resort Wear	(gold) Ukraine — Angelina Usanova; (silver) Mexico — María Lucía Ortega; (bronze) Venezuela — Valeria Andrea Medina
Best Eco Dress	(gold) Venezuela — Valeria Andrea Medina Figueroa; (silver) Netherlands — Kimary da Silva Carvalho; (bronze) Ukraine — Angelina Usanova
Miss Eco Top Model	Thailand — Kodchakorn Korntrakoon

== Contestants ==
Country/Territory	Candidates	Age (Note: Ages during the competition)	Hometown
Albania	Ana Morin	26	Tirana
Aruba	Jaimerlee de Meza	25	San Nicolas, Aruba
Australia	Riley Aston-Kampioti	29	Sydney
Belarus	Karyna Kisialiova	27	Minsk
Belgium	Luna De Vlam	23	Oostende
Brazil	Fabiane Alcarde Goia	30	Piracicaba
Canada	Nikita Dani	26	Toronto
China	Li Xiangqi	26	Chongqing
Colombia	Stephany Silva Castrillon	26	Santiago de Cali
Costa Rica	Natalia de los Ángeles Castillo Badilla	23	San Pedro
Czech Republic	Klára Porhajmová	20	Brno
Ecuador	Maria Denisse Jaramillo Celdo	24	Guayaquil
Egypt	Reem Elneweshy	24	Cairo
France	Laure-Emmanuelle Marion	28	Vichy
Haiti	Stéphanie Pierre	21	Cap-Haïtien
India	Sunayana Chawla	20	Bengaluru
Indonesia	Valerie Avril	21	Jakarta
Iraq	Sarah Nadeem		Sulaymaniyah
Japan	Maria Ishida	28	Kōchi
Kosovo	Ardiana Gashi	23	Pristina
Macedonia	Agnesa Berisha		Skopje
Malaysia	Jessica Gomez	22	Subang Jaya
Mexico	María Lucía Ortega Ruiz	23	San Luis Potosí
Nepal	Flavia Fabrice Maharjan	21	Kathmandu
Netherlands	Kimary da Silva Carvalho	21	The Hague
Nigeria	Vivian Onuigbo Kosisochukwu		Achina, Anambra
Paraguay	Fabiola Martínez	30	Villarrica, Paraguay
Philippines	Chantal Elise Legaspi Schmidt	22	Cebu
Portugal	Sofia Petruk	18	Madeira
Romania	Gabriela Gomez Raiciof	28	Bucharest
Russia	Vesta Oftina	19	Moscow
South Africa	Rea Mangope	22	Randgate
South Korea	Lee Su-min	21	Seoul
Spain	Karla Lopez Villar	24	Ferrol
Taiwan	Lu Yu-Chieh		Taipei
Thailand	Kodchakorn Korntrakoon	24	Bangkok
Trinidad & Tobago	Jessika Emrit	21	Saint Augustine
Ukraine	Angelina Usanova	26	Kyiv
United Kingdom	Ellie Daglish	22	Hereford
United States	Sabrina Ramos	26	Miami
Venezuela	Valeria Andrea Medina Figueroa	23	Caracas
Vietnam	Hoang Thi Kim Chi	27	Ho Chi Minh City

== Notes ==
Special awards: Miss Eco France makes the top 20 for best national costumes.
