= Miss Eco International 2016 =

2nd Miss Eco International edition

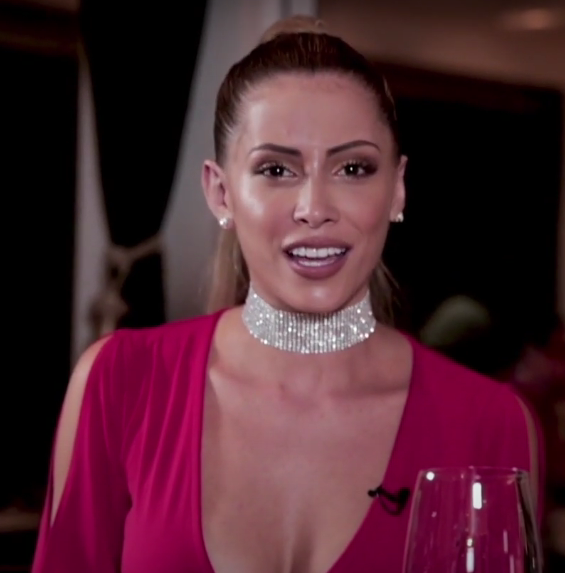
- Natalia Carvajal
- Date: April 14, 2016
- Hosts: Jerry Nayna; Nancy Magdy
- Theme: Beauty for Eco
- Venue: Great Pyramid of Giza; Giza, Egypt
- Broadcaster: Streaming: YouTube
- Entrants: 54
- Placements: 16
- Debuts: Albania; Algeria; United States; Argentina; Bashkortostan; Belarus; Belgium; Bolivia; Brazil; China; Estonia; Philippines; Finland; Guatemala; Haiti; India; Indonesia; England; Japan; Germany; Kenya; Kyrgyzstan; Colombia; Kosovo; Costa Rica; Belarus; Lebanon; Luxembourg; Malaysia; Mauritius; Moldova; Morocco; Myanmar; Paraguay; Portugal; France; Russia; Rodrigues; Romania; Singapore; Spain; Sweden; Tajikistan; Thailand; Ukraine; Vietnam; Venezuela; Greece
- Withdrawals: Cape Verde; Denmark; Dominican Republic; Fiji; Great Britain; Kazakhstan; Macedonia; Nigeria; Slovenia
- Winner: Natalia Carvajal; Costa Rica
- Best National Costume: Sarah Olvah Veron Alhamid (Indonesia)
- Photogenic: Anastasia Yakovleva (Bashkortostan)
- Best Eco Dress: Leainy Angelith Castillo (Venezuela)

Miss Eco International 2016 formerly Miss Eco Universe 2016 was the second edition of Miss Eco International held on Great Pyramid of Giza in Giza, Egypt on April 14, 2016.

Patricia Peklar of Slovenia crowned Natalia Carvajal of Costa Rica as her successor at the end of the event. This marks Costa Rica's first victory at Miss Eco International.

== Pageant ==
=== Location and date ===
On March 29, 2016, Miss Eco International held a press conferences announcing the location and date of final show of the Miss Eco International 2016. The competition took place in Cairo, Egypt's capital, in front of the Great Pyramid of Giza, the oldest and greatest of the three pyramids of Giza on April 15, 2016.

=== Format ===
The number of semifinalists in this edition increased from five to sixteen. The preliminary competition, consisting of the miss talent, eco dress segment, national costume, resort wear and closed-door interviews, determined the semifinalists for the pageant. The winner of Best in Eco Dress will automatically advanced to the semifinals. The initial group of semifinalists then competed from which sixteen contestants progressed to the evening gown competition. Subsequently, eight contestants advanced to the question-and-answer round, where the winner and her runners-up were announced.

=== Selection committee ===
- Pedro Mendes – Swiss model, Mister International 2015
- Olga Blanc – Fashion designer
- Bushra – Egyptian actress
- Dr. Amaal Rezk – Chairwoman of Miss Eco International

== Results ==
=== Placements ===
Placement	Contestant
Miss Eco International 2016	Costa Rica – Natalia Carvajal
1st Runner-Up	Brazil – Laís Berté
2nd Runner-Up	China – Jiayi Serena Yuan
3rd Runner-Up	Bashkortostan – Anastasia Yakovleva
Top 8	Belarus – Darya Koleychik; Chile – Nicole Scott; Mexico – Monica Hernandez; United States – Samantha Hart
Top 16	Argentina – Naomi Mendes; Colombia – Alexandra Herrera; Egypt – Kholoud Ezz; Indonesia – Olvah Alhamid; Netherlands – Laura Ghobrial; Portugal – Carolina Liquito; Russia – Alena Raeva; Venezuela – Leainy Jaimes §

§ – Automatically placed into the Top 16 for winning Best Eco Dress

=== Special awards ===
Awards	Winners
Miss Congeniality	Kenya – Julia Njoroge
Miss Photogenic	Bashkortostan – Anastasia Yakovleva
Best National Costumes	(gold) Indonesia – Olvah Alhamid; (silver) Brazil – Laís Berté; (bronze) Vietnam – Dương Nguyễn Khả Trang
Miss Eco Dress	(gold) Venezuela – Leainy Jaimes; (silver) Brazil – Laís Berté; (bronze) Chile – Nicole Scott
Miss Resort Wear	(gold) Bashkortostan – Anastasia Yakovleva; (silver) Argentina – Naomi Mendes; (bronze) Belarus – Darya Koleychik
Miss Elegance	(gold) Egypt – Kholoud Ezz; (silver) Brazil – Laís Berté; (bronze) Mexico – Monica Hernandez
Miss Fitness	Cuba – Brenda Estrada Enriquez
Miss Beautiful Smile	Japan – Chisato Nagayasu
Miss Online	Indonesia – Olvah Alhamid
Best Tourism Video	Nepal – Nagma Shrestha

== Candidates ==
54 contestants competed for the title:

Country/Territory	Contestant	Age (Note: Ages during the competition)	Hometown
Albania	Anxhela Lila	23	Tirana
Algeria	Ines Belkacem	24	Algiers
Argentina	Claudia Naomi Mendez	24	Buenos Aires
Australia	Rachel Alice Hope Guest	19	Sydney
Bashkortostan	Anastasia Yakovleva	27	Ufa
Belarus	Darya Koleychick	24	
Belgium	Isha Frederick	19	
Bolivia	Vivian Susana Serrano	22	
Brazil	Lais Berté	24	
Chile	Nicole Scott	25	
China	Jiayi Serena Yuan	27	
Colombia	Alexandra Herrera Avendaño	27	
Costa Rica	Natalia Carvajal	25	
Cuba	Brenda Estrada Enriquez	21	
Egypt	Kheloud Ezz	26	
England	Kate Marie	21	
Estonia	Kerstin Marran	22	
Finland	Anna Opalko	21	
France	Marcie Melissa Monfret	24	
Germany	Saskia Klotz	23	
Greece	Christina Lazaros	20	
Guatemala	Thalía Raquel Carredano	24	
Haiti	Seydina Allen	21	
India	Sophiya Singh	20	
Indonesia	Sarah Olvah Veron Alhamid	25	
Japan	Chisato Nagayasu	24	
Kenya	Julia Njoroge	24	
Kosovo	Hirka Uglurica	24	
Kyrgyzstan	Altinay Muhaitasova	20	
Lebanon	Jessica Abi Aad	22	
Luxembourg	Chiara Vanderveeren	21	
Malaysia	Annatasha Shanty Jeremiah	19	
Mauritius	Varsha Ragoobarsing	25	
Mexico	Mónica Hernández Reynaga	22	
Moldova	Elizaveta Mishina	23	
Morocco	Mounia El Merchani	21	
Myanmar	Nan Seing Lin Kham	23	
Nepal	Nagma Shrestha	24	
Netherlands	Laura Ghobrial	19	
Paraguay	Vanessa Noemí Cristaldo	20	
Philippines	Aurora Asunción	21	
Portugal	Carolina Liquito	19	
Rodrigues	Emilie Albert	24	
Romania	Andrada Butilca	24	
Russia	Alena Reava	22	
Singapore	Hashiena Jan	23	
Spain	Dayana Andreu Martinez	26	
Sweden	Matilda Helgstrand	23	
Tajikistan	Nasiba Naimkhonova	19	Dushanbe
Thailand	Pisolaya Jarukeitikul	18	Bangkok
Ukraine	Marina Stelmakh	24	
United States	Samantha Joy Hart	27	California
Venezuela	Leainy Angelith Jaimes	19	Caracas
Vietnam	Dương Nguyễn Khả Trang	23	Hà Giang
