= Miss Eco International 2017 =

3rd Miss Eco International edition

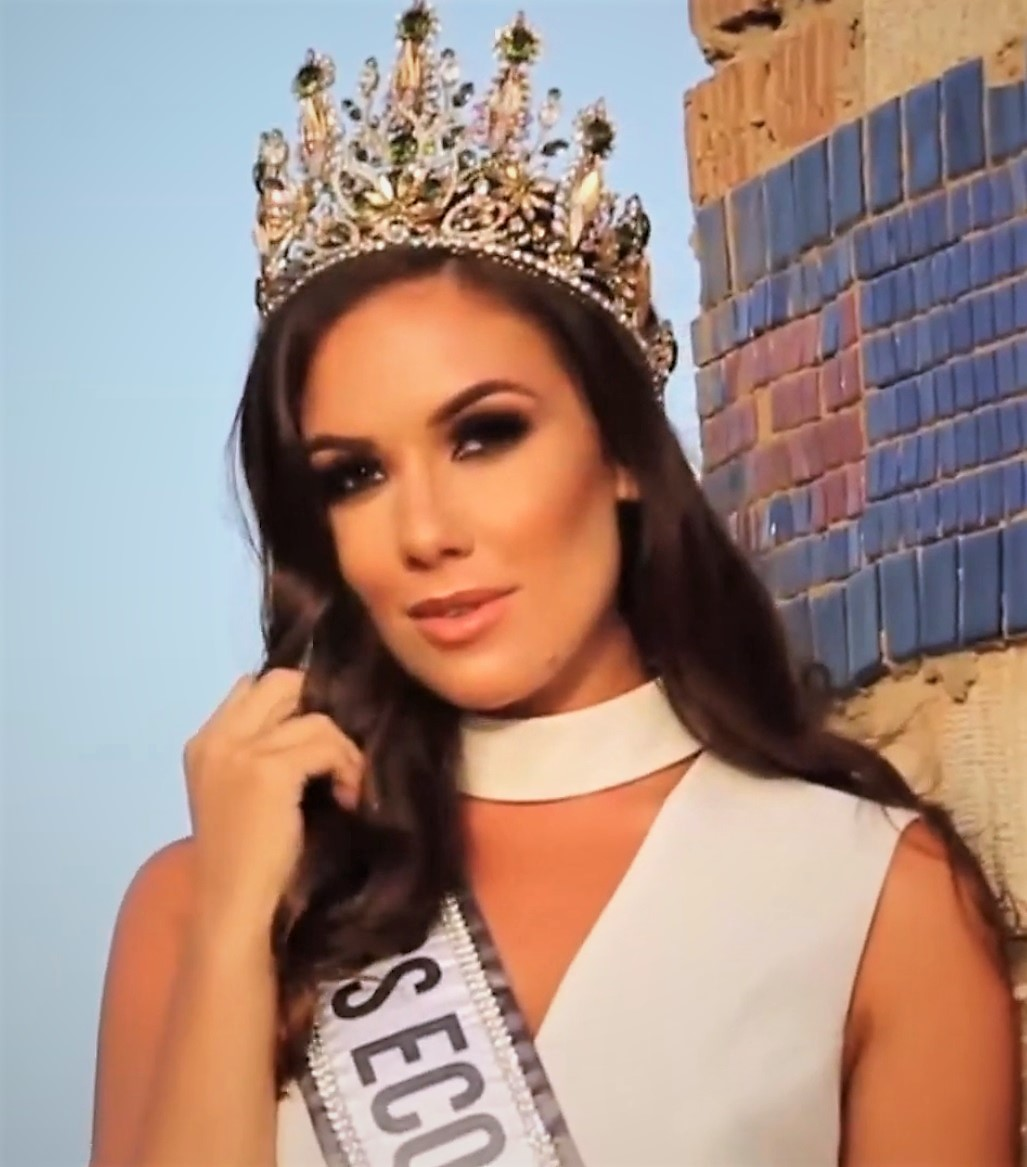
- Amber Bernachi
- Date: April 14, 2017
- Hosts: Jerry Nayna; Nancy Magdy
- Venue: Maritim Jolie Ville International Convention Center; Sharm el-Sheikh, Egypt
- Entrants: 56
- Placements: 21
- Debuts: Bulgaria; Canada; Croatia; Kazakhstan; Macau; Malta; Montenegro; New Zealand; Pakistan; Panama; Poland; Puerto Rico; Serbia; South Africa, Zimbabwe
- Withdrawals: Argentina; Bolivia; Cuba; Estonia; Finland; Guatemala; Haiti; England; Lebanon; Luxembourg; Morocco; Sweden; Tajikistan
- Winner: Amber Bernachi; Canada
- Best National Costume: Ayhemeis Henriquez (Panama)

Miss Eco International 2017 was the third edition of the beauty pageant Miss Eco International held on Maritim Jolie Ville International Congress Center, Sharm El Sheikh, Egypt on April 14, 2017. The pageant had two editions held under its former name, Miss Eco Queen and Miss Eco Universe. In order to become standardized and to embrace new countries, the pageants chairwoman Dr. Amaal Rezk adopted International on its name.

Natalia Carvajal of Costa Rica crowned Amber Bernachi of Canada as her successor at the end of the event. This marks Canada's first victory at Miss Eco International.

== Background ==
=== Location and date ===
The pageant started on April 1 to April 14 and it was held on Maritim Jollie Ville Convention Center in Sharm El Sheikh, Egypt.

== Results ==
Placement	Candidates
Miss Eco International 2017	Canada – Amber Bernachi
1st Runner-up	Pakistan – Anzhelika Tahir
2nd Runner-up	Belgium – Fenne Verrecas
3rd Runner-up	Vietnam – Nguyen Thi Thanh
4th Runner-up	Belarus – Anastasia Kaptsiuh §
Top 10	Indonesia – Annisa Nusyirwan; Moldova – Anastasia Fotachi; Panama – Ayhemeis Henriquez; Russia – Miroslava Kurashnina; Ukraine – Natalia Varchenko
Top 21	Chile – Fernanda Caro; China – Xin Zhao; Japan – Hitomi Sato; Malta – Maria Ellul; Mauritius – Elisa Rosse; Mexico – Verónica Salas Vallejo; Montenegro – Kristina Mitrovic; Myanmar – May Myat Noe Khin; Philippines – Ramona Yamat; South Africa – Temeike Sreicher; Thailand – Chanita Jantanet

§ – Automatically placed into the Top 10 for winning Best Eco Dress

∆ – Automatically placed into the Top 21 for winning Miss Talent

=== Continental Queens ===
Continental Titles	Contestant
Miss Eco Africa	Egypt – Rewan Alaa
Miss Eco North America	United States – Anh Do
Miss Eco Latin America	Brazil – Stephany Pim
Miss Eco Asia	Bashkortostan – Kristina Eremeeva
Miss Eco Europe	Portugal – Diana Santos
Miss Eco Ambassador	Spain – Marta Lorenzo

=== Special awards ===
Awards	Winners
Best National Costume	(gold) Panama – Ayhemeis Henriquez; (silver) Egypt – Rewan Alaa; (bronze) Indonesia – Annisa Nusyirwan
Miss Eco Congeniality	Nepal – Ronali Amatya
Miss Eco Photogenic	Brazil – Stephany Pim
Best Eco Tourism Video	Greece – Mellisa Rizos
Miss HEMA Joe	Russia – Miroslava Kurashnina
Miss Eco Fitness	Paraguay – Coca Notario
Best Smile	Thailand – Chanita Jantanet
Resort Wear	(gold) Moldova – Anastasia Fotachi; (silver) Belgium – Fenne Verrecas; (bronze) Malta – Maria Ellul
Best Eco Dress	(gold) Indonesia – Annisa Nusyirwan; (silver) Thailand – Chanita Jantanet; (bronze) Vietnam – Nguyen Thi Thanh
Miss Eco Talent	(gold) Belarus – Anastasia Kaptsiuh; (silver) Australia – Elice Craig; (bronze) Ukraine – Natalia Varchenko

== Candidates ==
56 candidates competed for the title:

Country/Territory	Contestant
Albania	Shanila Ademi
Algeria	Imine Zaitri
Australia	Elice Craig
Bashkortostan	Kristina Eremeeva
Belgium	Fenne Verrecas
Belarus	Anastasiya Kaptsiuh
Brazil	Stephany Pim
Bulgaria	Yoana Karastoianova
Canada	Amber Bernachi
Chile	Fernanda Caro
China	Xin Zhao
Colombia	Brenda Arzuza
Costa Rica	Estefanía Mora
Croatia	Jelena Amanović
Cuba	Heidy Fass
Egypt	Rewan Alaa
France	Sonia Aït Mansour
Germany	Valona Xh
Greece	Mellisa Rizos
India	Khyati Sharma
Indonesia	Annisa Nusyirwan
Japan	Hitomi Sato
Kazakhstan	Alua Azilkhanova
Kenya	Caroline Kamar
Kosovo	Emilia Dobreva
Kyrgyzstan	Omurzakova Tansuluu
Macau	Rebecca Liu
Malaysia	Janice Tan
Malta	Maria Ellul
Mauritius	Elisa Rosse
Mexico	Verónica Salas Vallejo
Moldova	Anastasia Fotachi
Montenegro	Kristina Mitrovic
Myanmar	May Mayat Noe
Netherlands	Floor Masselink
Nepal	Ronali Amatya
New Zealand	Zoom Fitton
Panama	Ayhemeis Henríquez
Pakistan	Anzhelika Tahir
Paraguay	Coca Notario
Philippines	Ramona Yamat
Poland	Karolina Banach
Puerto Rico	Kimberly Soto
Portugal	Diana Santos
Rodrigues	Diana Rose
Romania	Kristina Ciasovschih
Russia	Miroslava Kvashnina
Serbia	Sara Stojanović
Singapore	Sara Thashah
South Africa	Temieke Streiche
Spain	Marta Lorenzo
Thailand	Chanita Jantanet
Ukraine	Natalia Varchenko
United States	Anh Do
Venezuela	Gabriela España
Vietnam	Nguyễn Thanh
Zimbabwe	Letwin Tiwaringe
