= Miss Eco International 2015 =

1st Miss Eco International edition

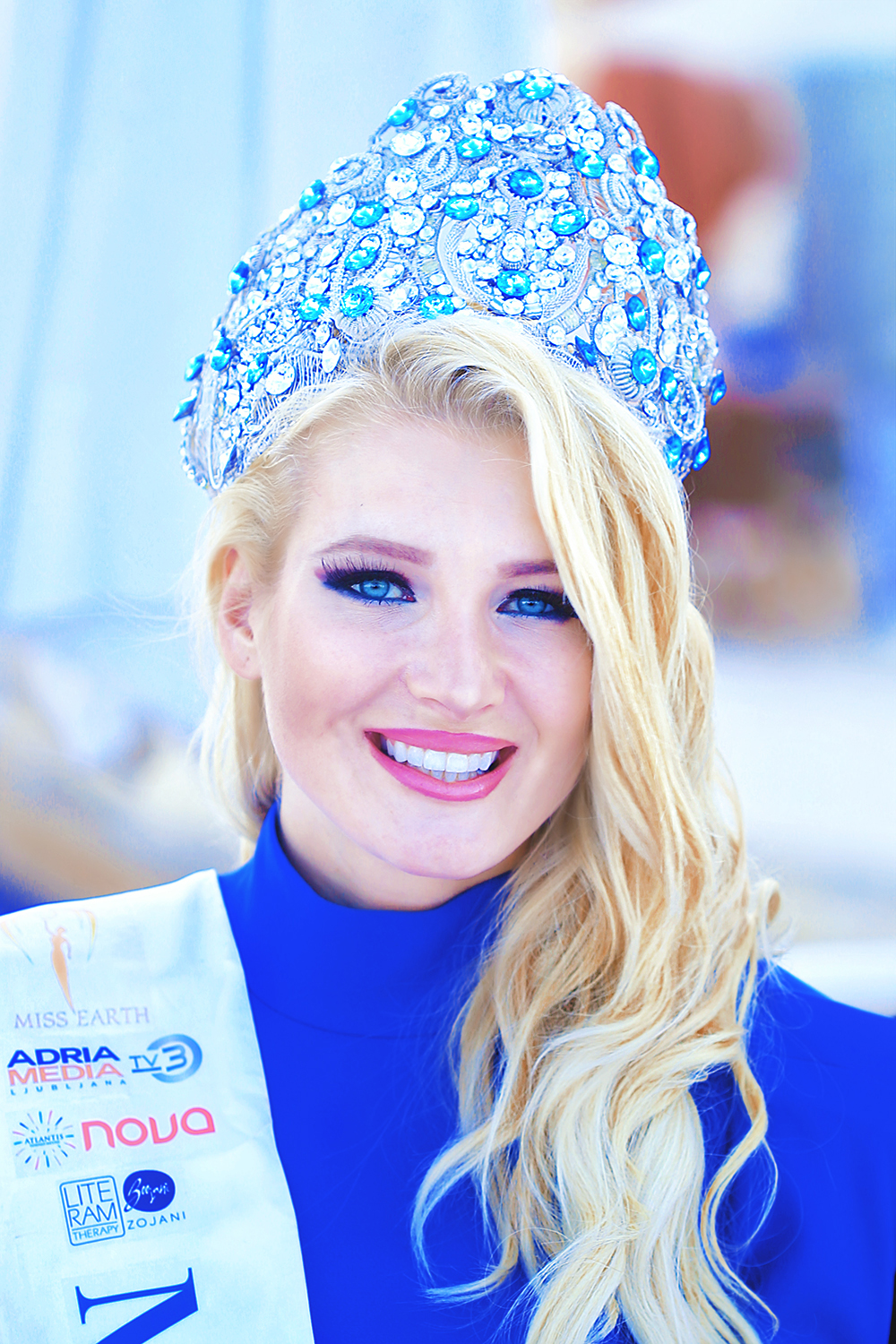
- Patricia Peklar
- Date: April 5, 2015
- Presenters: Jerry Nayna; Nancy
- Venue: Hilton Green Plaza Hotel, Alexandria, Egypt
- Entrants: 9
- Placements: 5
- Debuts: Australia; Chile; Egypt; Fiji; Great Britain; Mexico; Nepal; Netherlands; Slovenia
- Winner: Patricia Peklar; Slovenia
- Best National Costume: Catalina Cáceres; Chile

Miss Eco International 2015 formerly Miss Eco Queen 2015 was the first edition of the Miss Eco International pageant, held in Alexandria, Egypt, on April 5, 2015. At the end of the event, Patricia Peklar of Slovenia was crowned the first Miss Eco International.

== Results ==
=== Placements ===
Placement	Contestant
Miss Eco Queen 2015	Slovenia – Patricia Peklar
1st Runner-up	Netherlands – Talisa Wolters
2nd Runner-Up	Australia – Nadine Roberts
3rd Runner-Up	Chile – Catalina Cáceres
4th Runner-Up	Mexico – Yareli Carrillo Salas

=== Special awards ===
Award	Contestant
Best In National Costume	Chile – Catalina Cáceres
Miss Elegance	Mexico – Yareli Carrillo Salas
Miss Talent	Slovenia – Patricia Peklar

== Contestants ==
Nine contestants competed for the title.

Country/Territory	Contestant	Age (Note: Ages during the competition)	Hometown
Australia	Nadine Roberts	20	Sydney
Chile	Catalina Cáceres	23	Santiago
Fiji	Zoe McCracken	17	Suva
Great Britain	Sarah Archer	24	London
Mexico	Yareli Carrillo Salas	22	Culiacán
Egypt	Nancy Magdy	21	Cairo
Nepal	Prinsha Shrestha	23	Kathmandu
Netherlands	Talisa Wolters	24	Amsterdam
Slovenia	Patricia Peklar	25	Ljubljana
