= Álvaro Mesén =

Costa Rican footballer (born 1972)

Personal information
- Full name: Álvaro Mesén Murillo
- Date of birth: December 24, 1972 (age 53)
- Place of birth: Alajuela, Costa Rica
- Height: 1.80 m (5 ft 11 in)
- Position: Goalkeeper

Senior career*
Years	Team	Apps	(Gls)
1992–1993	Carmelita		
1993–2004	Alajuelense	207	(1)
2004–2006	Herediano	67	
2006–2007	Brujas	28	(0)
2007–2010	Liberia Mía	63	(0)

International career
1999–2006	Costa Rica	38	(0)
- * Club domestic league appearances and goals

Álvaro Mesén Murillo (born December 24, 1972) is a retired Costa Rican footballer.

== Club career ==
Upon club legend Alejandro González Rojas's retirement in September 1990, then-sixteen years old Álvaro Mesén was called upon to the Alajuelense senior team to backfill the third-choice goalkeeper position, behind the more experienced pair of Desiderio Calvo and Paul Mayorga; however upon the signing of former Herediano goalkeeper José Alexis Rojas in early 1991, Mesén was sent back to the youth teams. Rojas's signing had the purpose of adding experience to Alajuelense's door, which was lacking upon González's retirement as Mayorga and Calvo only started a handful of games in the past two seasons, and neither one of them could keep the other's faults in check.

Mesén made his league debut for Carmelita on 6 March 1993 against Turrialba during the 1992–93 season before heading back to parent club Alajuelense ahead of the 1993–94 season.

Mesén eventually became an understudy to Rojas who was the first-choice goalkeeper, and rose to first-choice keeper himself ahead of the 1997–98 season, when Rojas's career ended at Alajuelense as a result of being on the receiving end of an eight-match ban (as he was involved in a post-match brawl after a match against Saprissa in June 1997--Mesén also was involved in said brawl but received a minor ban), causing the Alajuelense's board of directors to show him the door as Rojas was going to be unavailable for six matches (having served two on the 1996–97 season's finals).

He went on to play 207 league games for Liga, scoring one goal, a penalty in the 1999–2000 season.

He also played for Herediano and Brujas before finishing his career at Liberia Mía, after joining them in 2007.

== International career ==
Mesén made his debut for Costa Rica in a November 1999 friendly match against Slovakia and earned a total of 38 caps, scoring no goals. He represented his country in 15 FIFA World Cup qualification matches and was a non-playing squad member at the 2002 and 2006 FIFA World Cups.

He also played at the 2003 UNCAF Nations Cup as well as at the 2002, 2003 and 2005 CONCACAF Gold Cups. He also was a non-playing squad member at the 2000 CONCACAF Gold Cup.

His final international was a May 2006 friendly match against the Czech Republic.

He has also become known for his activism, having been appointed as a FIFA ambassador in 2001 and supporting the 2002 FIFA World Cup Global March Against Child Labour campaign.

== Retirement ==
After retiring in 2010, Mesén became the new secretary-general of Fedefutbol in September 2012. He has a master's degree in business administration. He resigned from Fedefutbol in February 2013.
