= Miss Eco International 2021 =

International beauty pageant in Egypt

- Date: April 4, 2021
- Presenters: Nancy Magdy
- Venue: Baron Resort Sharm El Sheikh, Egypt
- Broadcaster: Streaming: YouTube
- Entrants: 39
- Debuts: Cameroon; Macedonia; Palestine; Reunion Island
- Withdrawals: Armenia; Aruba; Belarus; Brazil; China; Curacao; Denmark; El Salvador; Fernando de Noronha; Iceland; Kyrgyzstan; Mozambique; Myanmar; Netherlands; Paraguay; France; Poland; Puerto Rico; Serbia; Singapore; Slovenia; Tunisia; Ukraine; Greece; Zambia
- Returns: United Kingdom; Kazakhstan; Kosovo; Panama; Dominican Republic; Sweden
- Winner: Gizzelle Mandy Uys (South Africa)
- Best National Costume: Kelly Day (Philippines)

Miss Eco International 2021 was the sixth edition of Miss Eco International pageant, held on April 4, 2021 at Baron Resort Sharm El Sheikh, Egypt. This edition was originally scheduled from March 23 to April 11, 2020 but was postponed due to the COVID-19 pandemic. 55 contestants from all over the world competed for the international crown.

At the end of the event Amy Nurthinie of Malaysia crowned Gizzelle Mandy Uys from South Africa as the Miss Eco International 2021, marking the first victory of South Africa in Miss Eco International.

== Results ==
=== Placements ===
Placement	Candidates
Miss Eco International 2021	South Africa – Gizzelle Mandy Uys
1st Runner-up	Philippines – Kelly Day
2nd Runner-up	United States – Alexandria Kelly
3rd Runner-up	Venezuela – Steffania Rodriguez
4th Runner-up	Costa Rica – Kristel Freeman
Top 10	Belgium – Zehra Naldemir; Ecuador – Susan Toledo Arizaga; Indonesia – Intan Wisni Permatasari §; Panama – Yasmery Salceda; Thailand – Juthamas Mekseree
Top 20	Argentina – Barbara Cabrera; Bolivia – Hanna Unzueta; Canada – Jasmine Paguio; India – Harshita Bhambhani; Japan – Mayuko Hanawa; Malaysia – Shavinaa Balan ∆; Palestine – Lauren Imseeh; Peru – Lesly Reyna; Réunion Island – Anissa Malagouen; United Kingdom – Charlotte Brooke

§ – Automatically enters top 21 for winning Miss Eco Video ∆ – Automatically enters top 21 for winning Miss Eco Dress

=== Continental Queens ===
Continental Titles	Contestants
Miss Eco Africa	Mauritius – Hateefa Low Kom
Miss Eco America	Canada – Jasmine Paguio
Miss Eco Latin America	Bolivia – Hanna Unzueta Schlink
Miss Eco Europe	Germany – Vanessa Lapenita
Miss Eco Asia	Nepal – Anushma Rayamajhi

=== Special awards ===
Awards	Candidates
Best National Costume	(gold) Philippines – Kelly Day; (silver) Panama – Yasmery Salceda; (bronze) Thailand – Juthamas Mekseree
Miss Photogenic	Spain – Monica Yanes
Miss Congeniality	Finland – Emilia Lepomäki
Best in Talent Winners	(gold) Japan – Mayuko Hanawa; (silver) United States – Alexandria Kelly; (bronze) South Africa – Gizzelle Mandy Uys
Miss Eco Resort Wear	Venezuela – Steffanía Rodriguez; (silver) Thailand – Juthamas Mekseree; (bronze) South Africa – Gizzelle Mandy Uys
Best Evening Gown	Argentina – Barbara Cabrera
Miss Elegance	Dominican Republic –Dayanara Leonardo
Miss Top Model	Thailand – Juthamas Mekseree
Miss Eco Fitness	Palestine – Lauren Imseeh
Miss Eco Islands	Réunion Island – Anissa Malagouen
Miss Personality	Egypt – Alaa Atef
Miss Eco Video	Indonesia – Intan Wisni Permatasari
Miss Eco Dress	Malaysia – Shavinaa Balan
Miss Smile	Albania – Jensila Shaba
Miss Vatika Beautiful Hair	Montenegro –Una Mugoša

== Candidates ==
Country/Territory	Contestants	Age (Note: Ages during the competition)
Albania	Xhensila Shaba	
Argentina	Barbara Cabrera	
Bashkortostan	Aliya Urazmetova	
Belgium	Zehra Naldemir	
Bolivia	Hanna Unzueta Schlink	
Cameroon	Audrey Fortunata Bieme	
Canada	Jasmine Paguio	
Costa Rica	Kristel Ruiz Freeman	
Dominican Republic	Dayanara Leonardo	
Ecuador	Susan Toledo	
Egypt	Alaa Atef	
Finland	Emilia Lepomäki	
Germany	Vanessa Lapenita	
India	Harshita Bhambhani	
Indonesia	Intan Wisni Permatasari	
Japan	Mayuko Hanawa	
Kazakhstan	Ascah June Ouko	
Kosovo	Aninna Ninna	
Macedonia	Joana Kamberaj	
Malaysia	Shavinaa Balan	
Mauritius	Hateefa Low Kom	
Mexico	Astrid Moraga	
Montenegro	Una Mugoša	
Nepal	Anushma Rayamajhi	
Palestine	Lauren Imseeh	
Panama	Yasmery Salceda	
Peru	Lesly Reyna	
Philippines	Kelly Day	
Portugal	Carina Neto	
Réunion Island	Anissa Malagouen	
Russia	Kristina Schenkneht	
South Africa	Gizzelle Mandy Uys	24
South Korea	Jasmine Kim	
Spain	Mónica Yanes	
Sweden	Sofie Westh	
Thailand	Juthamas Mekseree	
United Kingdom	Charlotte Sophie Brooke	
United States	Alexandria Kelly	
Venezuela	Steffania Rodriguez Vivas	
