= Palmira Ruiz =

Mexican beauty pageant titleholder

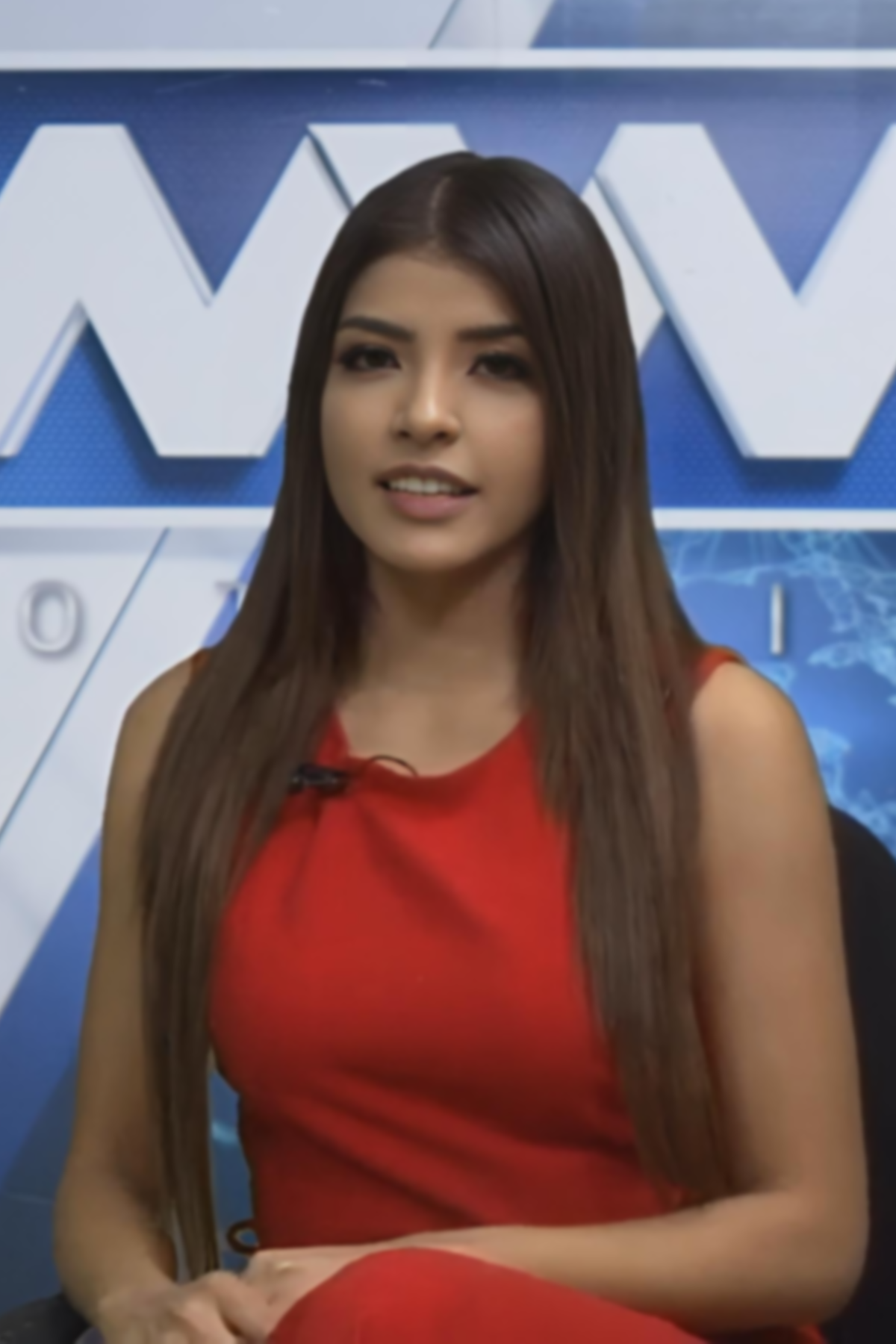
- Ruiz in 2019
- Born: Palmira Ariannda Ruiz Vigueras; Huajuapan de León, Oaxaca, Mexico
- Height: 1.70 m (5 ft 7 in)
- Beauty pageant titleholder
- Title: Miss Global Mexico 2019; Miss Supranational Mexico 2021; Miss Eco Mexico 2026; Miss Eco International 2026
- Major competitions: Miss Global 2019; (Top 12); Miss Supranational 2021; (Unplaced); Miss Eco International 2026; (Winner)

Palmira Ariannda Ruiz Vigueras is a Mexican television host and beauty pageant titleholder. She became the first Mexican to win the title of Miss Eco International 2026.

== Life and education ==
Ruiz was born in Huajuapan de León, Oaxaca. She earned a degree in Communication Sciences and developed a professional career in media. She worked as a television presenter for several regional media outlets, including TV Azteca Oaxaca, and MVM Noticias Oaxaca.

== Career ==
=== Philanthropic ===
Ruiz has become known for her philanthropic and advocacy work. She has promoted initiatives focused on animal welfare, environmental sustainability, women’s empowerment, and community development.

Among her most notable projects are Corazón Verde (Green Heart), dedicated to animal protection and responsible pet ownership, and Women Creating a Sustainable Future, an initiative that encourages female leadership, education, and participation in sustainable community projects. She has also supported women undergoing cancer treatment through the Distintivo Rosa (Pink Distinction) program, which organizes hair donations for the creation of wigs for cancer patients.

=== Pageantry ===
Ruiz began her national pageant career by winning the Miss Global Mexico title, which made her Mexico's representative at Miss Global 2019, where she placed among the Top 12. Two years later, Ruiz was appointed to represent her country at Miss Supranational 2021, where she did not place.

In 2026, Ruiz represented Mexico at the Miss Eco International pageant. During the competition, she won the Best Costume Carnival award. At the end of the event, Ruiz succeeded the outgoing titleholder Alexie Brooks of the Philippines, becoming the first Mexican titleholder of the pageant.

Awards and achievements
Preceded by (Philippines) Alexie Brooks	Miss Eco International; 2026	Succeeded by Incumbent
Preceded by Diana del Rey	Miss Eco Mexico; 2026	Succeeded by Incumbent
