= Miss Eco International =

Annual international beauty pageant

- Type: International beauty pageant
- Headquarters: Cairo, Egypt
- First edition: 2015
- Most recent edition: 2026
- Current titleholder: Palmira Ruiz; Mexico
- Parent organization: Ecospire
- Founder & Owner: Dr. Amaal Rezk
- Language: English
- Website: missecointernational.com

Miss Eco International is an annual international beauty pageant established in 2015. The competition features participants from various countries and territories and is held with a focus on environmental awareness and tourism promotion. The event is hosted in Egypt and emphasizes themes related to ecological sustainability and environmental advocacy.

The current titleholder of Miss Eco International 2026 is Palmira Ruiz of Mexico. She was crowned on May 22, 2026, in Alexandria, Egypt.

== History ==
Originally called as Miss Eco Queen, the beauty competition Miss Eco International debuted in 2015. In an attempt to become more well-known, it rebranded itself as Miss Eco Universe in 2016 and attracted over fifty applicants. It rebranded itself as Miss Eco International in 2017, and for weeks, contestants vie for the title and crown.

Miss Eco International is a global beauty contest that was started by the media production business "Belleza de Eco." Its primary goals are to promote tourism globally and raise awareness of the value of protecting the environment. It is set up as a globally recognized event that unites applicants from all communities and cultural backgrounds. Raising awareness of their nation's cultural heritage, environmental resources, and global commitment is the candidates' main objective.

However, the competition's primary goal is to choose an ecotourism image that may represent the industry in marketing campaigns, promote environmental tourism globally, and show the public how to use environmental resources responsibly. Through the candidates' sharing of experiences, it also advances the idea of saving the earth, both environmentally and culturally. They also provide special attention to the mental, physical, and spiritual health of each candidate, who represents a nation.

== Titleholders ==
=== Miss Eco Queen/Miss Eco Universe ===
First edition and former names of Miss Eco International.

Year	Titleholders	Runners-up				Venue	Participants	Ref.
Year	Titleholders	1st	2nd	3rd	4th	Venue	Participants	Ref.
2015	Patrisha Rimfire; Slovenia	Netherlands; Talisa Wolters	Australia; Nadine Roberts	Chile; Catalina Cáceres	Mexico; Yareli Carrillo	Alexandria, Egypt	9	
2016	Natalia Carvajal; Costa Rica	Brazil; Laís Berté	China; Serena Yuan Jiayi	Bashkortostan; Anastasiya Yevgenievna	–	Cairo, Egypt	54	

=== Miss Eco International ===
The event ended up changing its name from the 2017 edition onwards:

Year	Miss Eco International	Runners-up				Venue	Participants	Ref.
Year	Miss Eco International	1st	2nd	3rd	4th	Venue	Participants	Ref.
2017	Canada; Amber Bernachi	Pakistan; Anzhelika Tahir	Belgium; Fenne Verrecas	Vietnam; Nguyễn Thị Thành	Belarus; Anastasiya Kaptsiuh	Sharm El Sheikh, Egypt	56	
2018	Philippines; Cynthia Thomalla	Indonesia; Astira Intan Vernadeina	Peru; Kelin Rivera	Vietnam; Nguyen Thu Dung	Costa Rica; Glennys Medina	Alexandria, Egypt	52	
2019	Peru; Suheyn Cipriani (Note: Dethroned due to pregnancy during her reign)	Philippines; Maureen Montagne (Note: Declined the offer to become the titleholder due to her commitments with Binibining Pilipinas)	United States; Elizabeth Jordan	Ukraine; Diana Voliakova	Malaysia; Amy Nur Tinie (Note: Assumed the Miss Eco International 2019 title)	Cairo, Egypt	54	
2020 Cancelled due to the COVID-19 pandemic
2021	South Africa; Gizzelle Mandy Uys	Philippines; Kelley Day	United States; Alexandria Kelly	Venezuela; Steffanía Rodríguez	Costa Rica; Kristell Ruiz Freeman	Sharm el-Sheikh, Egypt	39	
2022	Philippines; Kathleen Joy Paton	Belgium; Chloë Reweghs	United States; Jesaura Peralta	Spain; Lucía Morales Cano	Malaysia; Prasana Shri	Cairo, Egypt	40	
2023	Vietnam; Nguyễn Thanh Hà	Nigeria; Nnena Odum	Mauritius; Yuvna Gookool	Cambodia; Sokhavatey Ratana	Ecuador; Genesis Guerrero	Cairo, Egypt	40	
2024	Ukraine; Angelina Usanova	Philippines; Chantal Schmidt	Canada; Nikita Dani	Brazil; Fabiane Goia	Indonesia; Valerie Avril	Cairo, Egypt	42	
2025	Philippines; Alexie Brooks	Indonesia; Yulinar Fitrani	Ukraine; Yelyzaveta Adamska	United States; Cynthia Murillo	United Kingdom; Victoria Repollo Inglis	Alexandria, Egypt	36	
2026	Mexico; Palmira Ruiz	Ukraine; Mishel Shotropa	Australia; Adriana Gravador	Indonesia; Nickyta Aurellia	Brazil; Joana de Camargo	Alexandria, Egypt	45	

=== Continental Queens ===
Edition	Miss Eco Africa	Miss Eco Americas		Miss Eco Asia		Miss Eco Europe	Miss Eco Oceania
Edition	Miss Eco Africa	Miss Eco North America	Miss Eco South America	Miss Eco Asia		Miss Eco Europe	Miss Eco Oceania
2017	Egypt; Rewan Alaa	United States; Anh Do	Brazil; Stephany Pim	Bashkortostan; Kristina Eremeeva		Portugal; Diana Santos	Not awarded
2018	South Africa; Izelle Van	United States; Jessica Jewel Vangaleen	Colombia; Lina Daniela Daza Contreras	Thailand; Natascha Pedersen		Bulgaria; Lina Carter	Not awarded
2019	Egypt; Farah Shabaan	Puerto Rico; Ciara Marie Rosendo Martínez	Brazil; Tainá Laydner Fiore	South Korea; Jo Ju-hyeon		Denmark; Raimonda Gečaitė	Not awarded
2021	Mauritius; Hateefa Low Kom	Canada; Jasmine Paguio	Bolivia; Hanna Unzueta Schlink	Nepal; Anushma Rayamajhi		Germany; Vanessa Lapenita	Not awarded
2022	Kenya; Ascah June Ouko	Canada; Farrah McGraw	Paraguay; Nara Bardales	Vietnam; Trần Hoài Phương		Portugal; Cristina Carvalho	Not awarded
2023	Egypt; Nagham Tarek	Mexico; Andrea Torres Pérez		Russia; Evgenia Parmyonova		Belarus; Yanina Spica	Not awarded
2024	Egypt; Reem Elneweshy	Paraguay; Fabiola Martinez		Iraq; Sarah Nadeem		Spain; Karla López Villar	Australia; Riley Aston-Kampioti
2025	South Africa; Gugulethu Mosibudi Mayisela	Mexico; Diana del Rey Duque		Japan; Miu Sakurai		Czech Republic; Jana Marvanová	New Zealand; Aileen Arnaldo
2026	Nigeria; Martha Onazi	Colombia; Ana Hernández		Vietnam; Thu Trúc Nguyễn (Note: Dethroned following allegations of attempted interference by her national director.)	Malaysia; Nivethaa Kumar (Note: Assumed the Miss Eco Asia 2026 title)	Finland; Rosa Kilpi	Australia; Adriana Gravador

Dethroned
Winner
Assumed Winner

Notes

Winners gallery

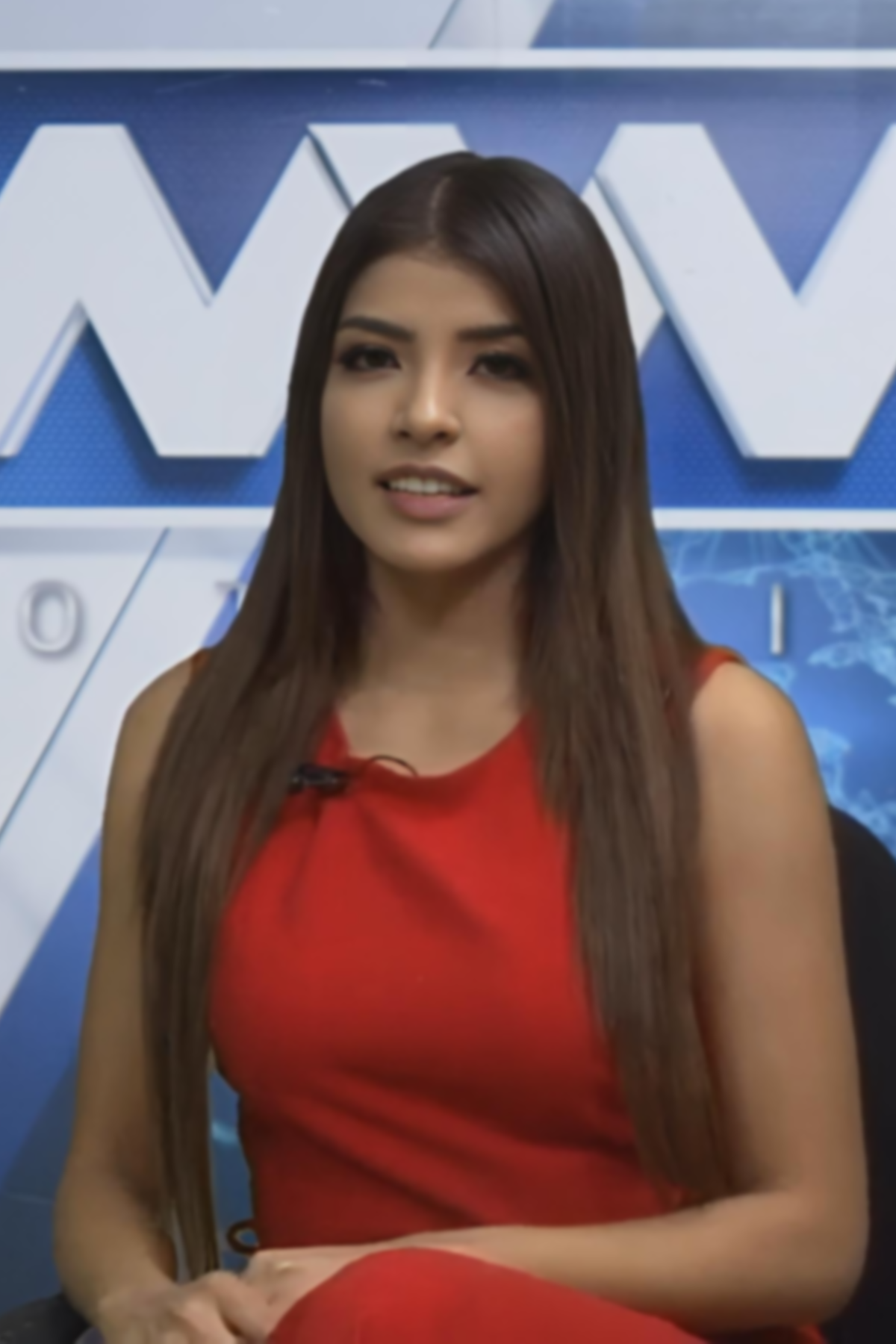
Miss Eco International 2026
Palmira Ruiz
Mexico

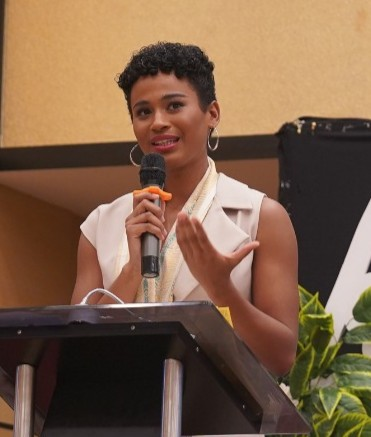
Miss Eco International 2025
Alexie Brooks
Philippines

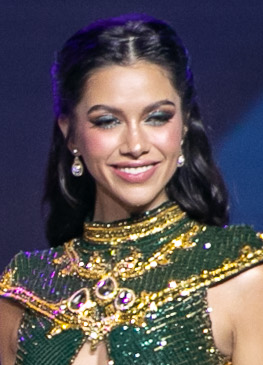
Miss Eco International 2022
Kathleen Joy Paton
Philippines

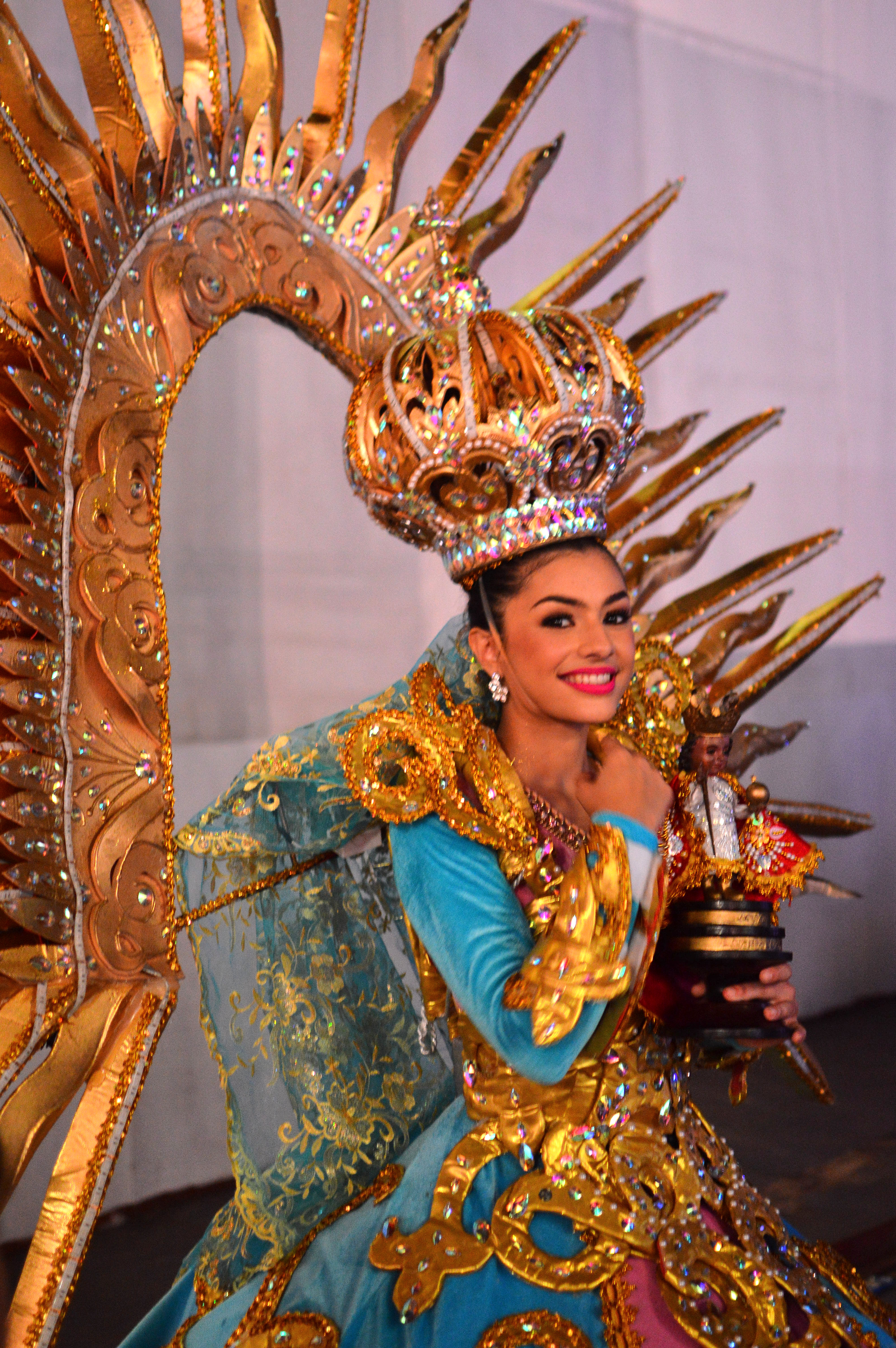
Miss Eco International 2018
Cynthia Thomalla
Philippines

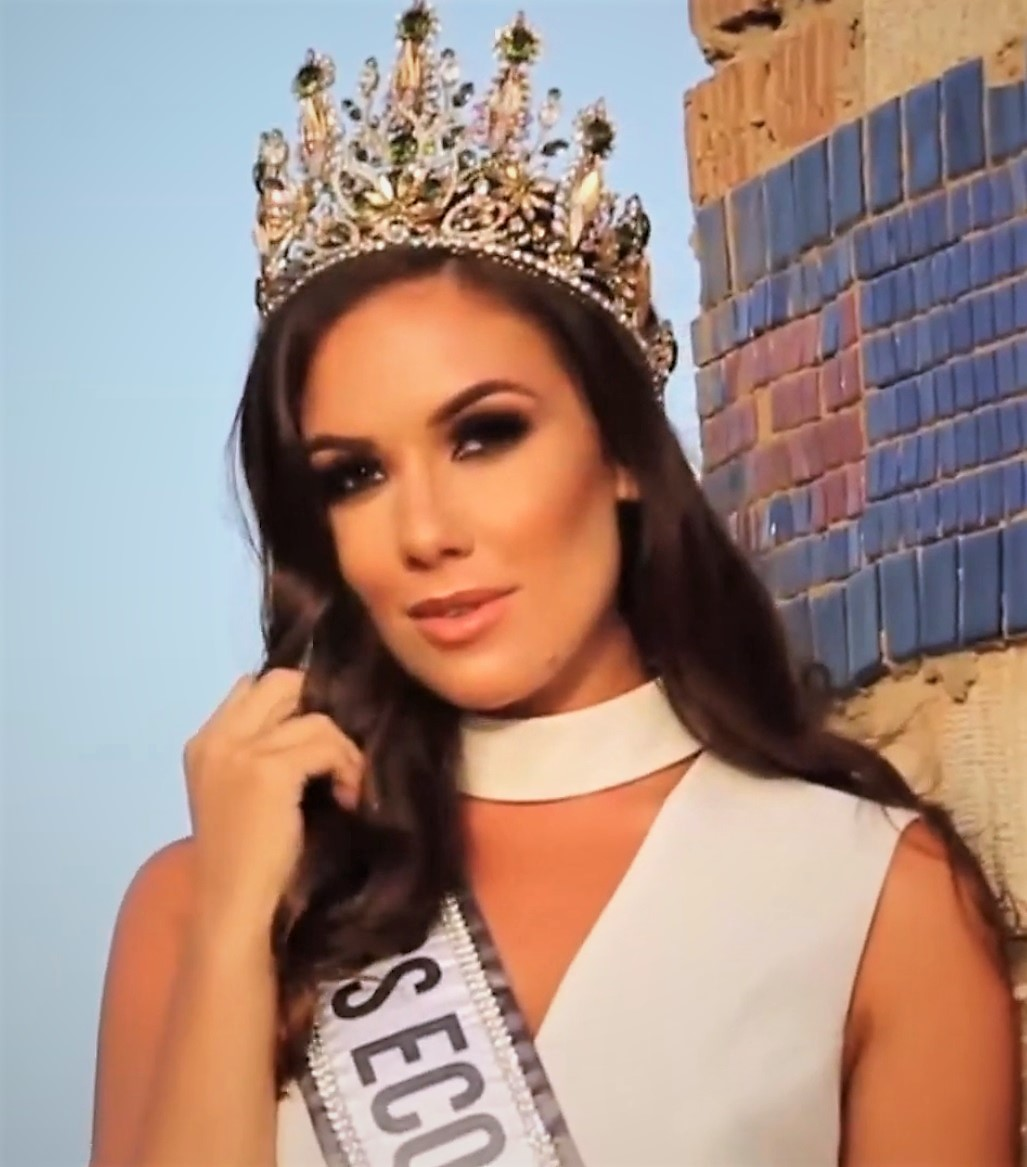
Miss Eco International 2017
Amber Bernachi
Canada

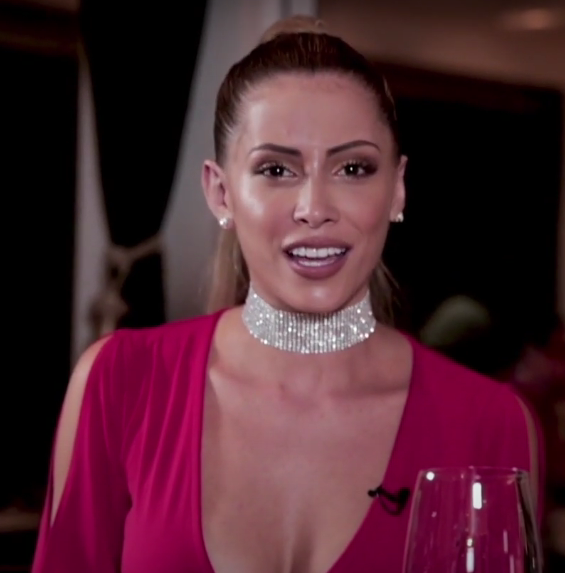
Miss Eco Universe 2016
Natalia Carvajal
Costa Rica

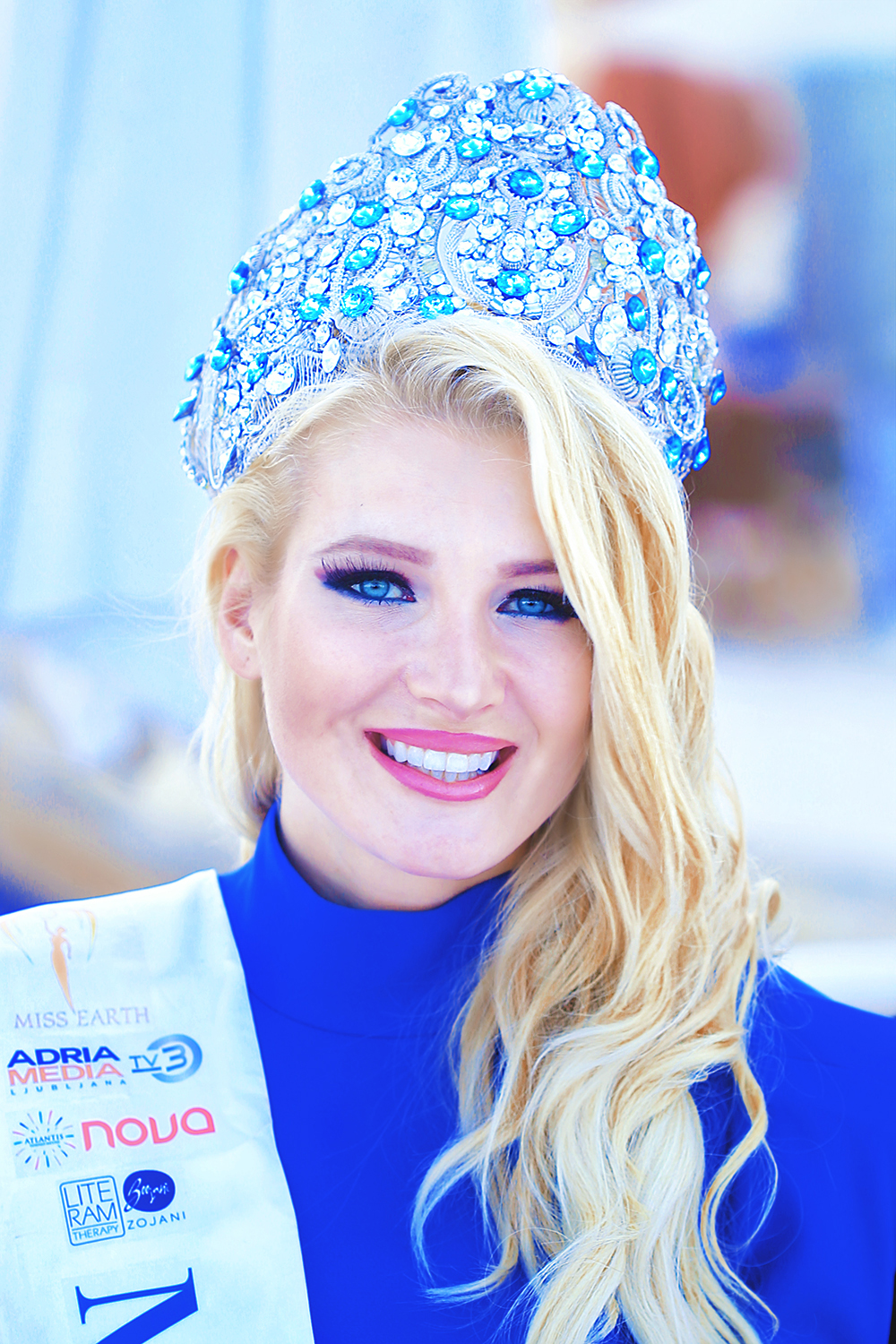
Miss Eco Queen 2015
Patricia Peklar
Slovenia
