= Miss Eco International 2022 =

7th edition of Miss Eco International pageant

- Date: 17th March 2022
- Venue: Jolie Ville Resort & SPA kings Island Luxor; Luxor, Egypt
- Broadcaster: Streaming: YouTube
- Entrants: 40
- Placements: 21
- Debuts: Ethiopia; Italy
- Withdrawals: Argentina; Bashkortostan; Ecuador; India; Japan; Germany; Kazakhstan; South Korea; Kosovo; North Macedonia; Palestine; Dominican Republic; Reunion Island; Sweden; Thailand
- Returns: Aruba; Brazil; Ghana; Haiti; Kenya; Myanmar; Netherlands; Nigeria; Pakistan; Paraguay; Serbia; China; Ukraine; Vietnam
- Winner: Kathleen Joy Paton (Philippines)
- Best National Costume: Diana Hamed (Egypt)
- Miss Eco Video: Kathleen Joy Paton (Philippines)

Miss Eco International 2022 was the seventh edition of Miss Eco International pageant, held on 17th March 2022 at the Jolie Ville Resort & SPA kings Island Luxor, Luxor, Egypt. Forty confirmed delegates competed for the international crown.

At the end of the event, Gizzelle Uys from South Africa crowned her successor Kathleen Joy Paton from the Philippines. This mark's the second crown for the Philippines in Miss Eco International pageant.

== Results ==
=== Placements ===
Placement	Candidates
Miss Eco International 2022	Philippines — Kathleen Joy Paton
1st Runner-up	Belgium — Chloe Reweghs
2nd Runner-up	United States — Jessica Peralta
3rd Runner-up	Spain — Lucia Morales Cano
4th Runner-up	Malaysia — Prasana Shri
Top 10	Costa Rica — Chinchilla Bermudez; Egypt — Diana Homed; Mexico — Grecia Soto; Netherlands — Elise Wester; Nigeria — Joy Omanibe
Top 21	Aruba — Zury Ruiz; Brazil — Anna Moura; Canada — Farrah McGraw; Finland — Matilda Wirtavuori; Indonesia — Jessica Grace Harvey; Montenegro — Anela Dzanovic; Myanmar — May Mon; Nepal — Sophiya Bhujel; Panama — Dariana Martinez; South Africa — Zipho Sithebe; Venezuela — Paula Meneses

Continental Queens
Title	Contestants
Miss Eco Africa	Kenya — Ascah June Ouko
Miss Eco America	Canada — Farrah McGraw
Miss Eco Asia	Vietnam — Trần Hoài Phương
Miss Eco Europe	Portugal — Cristina Carvalho
Miss Eco Latin America	Paraguay — Nara Bardales

Special Awards
Awards	Contestants
Best Eco Dress	Malaysia — Prasana Shri
Miss Eco Elegance	Malaysia — Prasana Shri
Miss Eco Top Model	Costa Rica — Sue Chinchilla Bermúdez
Best Resort Wear	United States — Jesaura Peralta
Miss Eco Talent	Spain — Lucía Morales Cano
Miss Eco Video	Philippines — Kathleen Joy Paton

== Contestants ==
Country/Territory	Candidates
Albania	Raina Babaramo
Aruba	Zury Ruiz
Belgium	Chloë Reweghs
Bolivia	Astrid Vaca Rico
Brazil	Anna Moura
Cameroon	Abinamba Darc
Canada	Farrah McGraw
China	Sophia Su
Costa Rica	Sue Chinchilla Bermúdez
Egypt	Diana Hamed
Ethiopia	Brkti "Yolanda" Fessha Gideay
Finland	Matilda Wirtavuori
Ghana	Mina Michaella Atiga
Haiti	Bárbara Laura Noel
Indonesia	Jessica Grace Harvery
Italy	Federica Rizza
Kenya	Ascah June Ouko
Netherlands	Elise Wester
Malaysia	Prasana Shri
Mauritius	Anna Yanisha Murden
Mexico	Grecia Victoria Ramírez Soto
Montenegro	Anela Dzanovic
Myanmar	May Mon
Nepal	Sophiya Bhujel
Nigeria	Joy Omanibe
Pakistan	Areej Chaudhary
Panama	Dariana Paola Martínez Abreu
Paraguay	Nara Bardales
Peru	Nadya Marie Yurawecz
Philippines	Kathleen Joy Paton
Portugal	Cristina Carvalho
Russia	Alina Martyneko
Serbia	Natasa Pilipovic
South Africa	Zipho Sithebe
Spain	Lucía Morales Cano
Ukraine	Anastasiya Panova
United Kingdom	Melissa Fiona Rae
United States	Jesaura Peralta
Venezuela	Paula Meneses
Vietnam	Trần Hoài Phương
