= Miss Eco International 2026 =

11th Edition of Miss Eco International

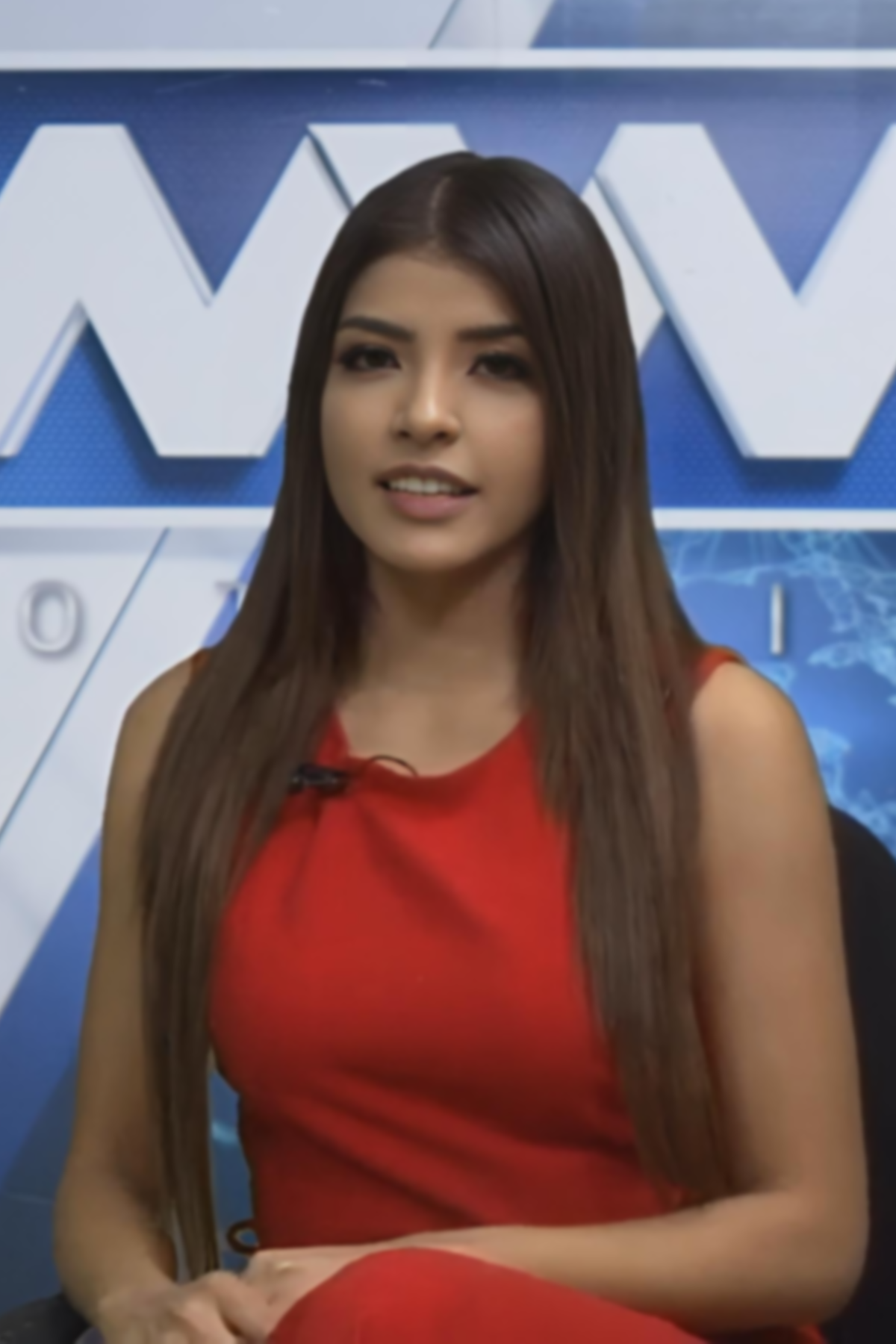
- Palmira Ruiz
- Date: May 22, 2026
- Hosts: Kitt Cortez
- Venue: Helnan Antoniades Palace Hotel, Alexandria, Egypt
- Broadcaster: YouTube
- Entrants: 45
- Placements: 21
- Debuts: Bangladesh; Hong Kong; Jamaica; Norway
- Withdrawals: Algeria; Belgium; Botswana; Costa Rica; Kenya; Moldova; Paraguay; Uganda; United Kingdom; Uzbekistan; Venezuela; Zimbabwe
- Returns: Albania; Australia; Chile; Colombia; Dominican Republic; Ecuador; Fernando de Noronha; France; Ghana; Haiti; Italy; Kosovo; Malaysia; Mauritius; Morocco; Peru; Portugal
- Winner: Palmira Ruiz; Mexico
- Best National Costume: Ana Hernández (Colombia)

Miss Eco International 2026 was the 11th edition of the Miss Eco International pageant, held on 22 May 2026 at the Helnan Antoniades Palace Hotel in Alexandria, Egypt.

Alexie Brooks of the Philippines crowned Palmira Ruiz of Mexico as her successor at the end of the event. This is Mexico's first victory in the history of the pageant.

== Results ==
=== Placements ===
Placement	Contestant
Miss Eco International 2026	Mexico – Palmira Ruiz
1st Runner-Up	Ukraine – Mishel Shotropa
2nd Runner-Up	Australia – Adriana Gravador
3rd Runner-Up	Indonesia – Nickyta Aurellia
4th Runner-Up	Brazil – Joana Camargo
Top 10	Chile – Hangarahi Vásquez; Colombia – Ana Hernández Δ; Malaysia – Nivethaa Kumar; Nepal – Sejal Rajbhandri; Nigeria – Martha Onazi
Top 21	China – Lily Xu; Finland – Rosa Kilpi; France – Louise Misako; India – Shaik Reema; Jamaica – Shannon Bucknor; Netherlands - Judith Bogema; Peru – Stephanie Schmatz; Philippines – Gabbi Carballo; Thailand – Jessica Niinimaa; United States – Kylie Klein; Vietnam – Thu Trúc Nguyễn

Δ – Automatically placed into the Top 20 for winning the best in national costume

==== Continental Queens ====
Continental titles	Candidates
Miss Eco Africa	Nigeria – Martha Onazi
Miss Eco America	Colombia – Ana Hernández
Miss Eco Asia	Vietnam – Thu Trúc Nguyễn (dethroned) (Note: Dethroned following allegations of attempted interference by her national director.)
Miss Eco Asia	Malaysia – Nivethaa Kumar (assumed)
Miss Eco Europe	Finland – Rosa Kilpi
Miss Eco Oceania	Australia – Adriana Gravador

==== Special Awards ====
Award	Candidates
Best in National Costume	Colombia – Ana Hernández
Best Eco Video	Malaysia – Nivethaa Kumar
Best in Talent	(gold) Indonesia – Nickyta Aurellia; (silver) Philippines – Gabbi Carballo; (bronze) Ghana – Michelle Appeah
Best Resort Wear	(gold) Nigeria – Martha Onazi; (silver) Brazil – Joana Camargo; (bronze) Netherlands - Judith Bogema; 4 Colombia – Ana Hernández; 5 Malaysia – Nivethaa Kumar
Best Eco Dress	Chile – Hangarahi Vásquez
Miss Eco Elegant	Thailand – Jessica Niinimaa
Miss Eco Top Model	Philippines – Gabbi Carballo
Best Costume Carnival	Mexico – Palmira Ruiz

== Candidates ==
45 candidates confirmed to compete the title:

Country/Territory	Candidates
Albania	Sabrina Isufi
Australia	Adriana Alaurice Gravador
Bangladesh	Avila Islam
Brazil	Joana Albernaz de Camargo
Canada	Olivea Loo
Chile	Hangarahi Pakarati Vásquez
China	Lily Xu
Colombia	Ana María Hernández Posada
Czech Republic	Anna Bartošová
Dominican Republic	Carolin Espinosa
Ecuador	Nahomi Loor
Egypt	Banan Maher
Fernando de Noronha	Andressa Sales
Finland	Rosa Beata Julia Kilpi
France	Louise Misako
Ghana	Michelle Appeah
Haiti	Kyria Salina Romusca
Hong Kong	Xie Yanwen
India	Shaik Reema
Indonesia	Nickyta Dhea Aurellia
Italy	Isabella Della Spina
Jamaica	Shannon Andrade Bucknor
Japan	Tsugumi Matsumoto
Kosovo	Adelina Isufi
Malaysia	Nivethaa Kumar
Mauritius	Kimberly Joseph
Mexico	Palmira Ariannda Ruiz Vigueras
Morocco	Sarah Thea
Nepal	Sejal Rajbhandri
Netherlands	Judith Bogema
New Zealand	Phoebe Long
Nigeria	Martha Ajih Onazi
Norway	Abelone Smedsrud
Peru	Stephanie Schmatz
Philippines	Gabriella Mai "Gabbi" Carballo
Portugal	Natacha Cristóvão
Russia	Taisia Viktorovna
South Africa	Botlhale Bemoya
Spain	Ana María Bueno Nieves
Taiwan	Wu Pin Yi
Tatarstan	Kamila Murtazina
Thailand	Jessica Cristina Niinimaa
Ukraine	Mishel Shotropa
United States	Kylie Klein
Vietnam	Nguyễn Thị Thu Trúc
