= Miss Eco International 2023 =

8th edition of Miss Eco International pageant

- Date: March 3, 2023
- Hosts: Nancy Magdy
- Venue: Triumph Luxury Hotel, Cairo, Egypt
- Broadcaster: Streaming: YouTube
- Entrants: 40
- Placements: 21
- Debuts: Botswana; Gabon; Iraq; Cambodia
- Withdrawals: Algeria; Colombia; Galapagos Island; France; Aruba; Bolivia; United Kingdom; Ethiopia; Ghana; Cameroon; Canada; Kenya; Montenegro; Myanmar; Peru
- Returns: Australia; Belarus; Argentina; Ecuador; India; Japan; South Korea
- Winner: Nguyễn Thanh Hà (Vietnam)
- Best National Costume: Andrea Torres Pérez (Mexico)
- Best Eco Video: Ratana Sokhavatey (Cambodia)

Miss Eco International 2023 was the eighth edition of Miss Eco International beauty pageant that aims to campaign for the green movement. It was held on March 3, 2023 at the Triumph Luxury Hotel, Cairo, Egypt. A total of 40 contestants appeared to compete at the end of the event.

At the end of the event Kathleen Joy Paton from the Philippines crowned her successor Nguyen Thanh Ha from Vietnam.

== Results ==
=== Placements ===
Placement	Candidates
Miss Eco International 2023	Vietnam — Nguyen Thanh Ha
1st Runner-up	Nigeria — Nnena Odum
2nd Runner-up	Mauritius — Yuvna Gookool
3rd Runner-up	Cambodia — Ratana Sokhavatey
4th Runner-up	Ecuador — Genesis Guerrero
Top 11	Belarus — Yanina Spica; Brazil — Paula Fernanda Assunção; Costa Rica — Shakira Graham; Paraguay — Evelyn Andrade; United States — Sydney Salinas; Venezuela — Johanna Aponte
Top 21	Australia — Naomie White; Belgium — Leilanie Bryssinck; China — Song Wei Wei; Egypt — Nagham Tarek; Malaysia — Tisya Ong; Mexico — Andrea Torres Pérez; Nepal — Rakchya Upreti; Panama — Abimeleth Sánchez; Philippines — Ashley Montenegro; South Africa — Jenique Botha

=== Continental Queens ===
Continental titles	Candidates
Miss Eco Africa	Egypt — Nagham Tarek
Miss Eco America	Mexico — Andrea Torres Pérez
Miss Eco Asia	Russia — Evgenia Parmyonova
Miss Eco Europe	Belarus — Yanina Spica

=== Special awards ===
Awarda	Candidates
Best in National Costume	Mexico — Andrea Torres Pérez
Best Evening Gown	United States — Sydney Salinas
Miss Eco Elegance	Venezuela — Johanna Aponte
Miss Eco Top Model	Mexico — Andrea Torres Pérez
Resort Wear Competition	(gold) Belarus — Yanina Spica; (silver) Brazil — Paula Fernanda Assunção; (bronze) Costa Rica — Shakira Graham
Miss Eco Talent	(gold) China — Song Wei Wei; (silver) Indonesia — Angela Shannon; (bronze) Ukraine — Anastasiia Lahuta
Best Eco Dress	(gold) Vietnam — Nguyen Thanh Ha; (silver) Belarus — Yanina Spica; (bronze) Indonesia — Angela Shannon

== Contestants ==
40 confirmed delegates competing for international crown.

Country/Territory	Candidates	Ages (Note: Ages during the competition)
Albania	Xireina Dervishi	
Argentina	Josefina Caso	
Australia	Naomie White	
Belarus	Yanina Spica	
Belgium	Leilanie Joanne Rose-an	
Botswana	Marang Phuthegelo	
Brazil	Paula Assunção	
Cambodia	Ratana Sokhavatey	
China	Song Wei Wei	
Costa Rica	Shakira Graham	
Ecuador	Génesis Nicole Guerrero Cabrera	
Egypt	Nagham Tarek	
Finland	Oona Komi	
Gabon	Verra Charline	
Haiti	Ruth Ajdn	
India	Soni Shekhawat	
Indonesia	Angela Shannon	
Iraq	Sarah Said	
Italy	Federica De Carlo	
Japan	Kyoka Itabashi	
Malaysia	Tisya Ong	
Mauritius	Yuvna Rinishta Gookool	23
Mexico	Andrea Torres Pérez	
Nepal	Rakchya Upreti	
Netherlands	Annisa Maghraoui	
Nigeria	Nnena Odum	
Pakistan	Anniqa Jamal Iqbal	22
Panama	Abimeleth Sanchez	
Paraguay	Evelyn Andrade	26
Philippines	Ashley Subijano Montenegro	24
Portugal	Carolina Pinheiro Serra	
Russia	Evgenia Parmyonova	
Serbia	Natasa Pilipovic	
South Africa	Jenique Botha	
South Korea	Lee Ha-yul	
Spain	Maryana Abreu	
Ukraine	Anastasiia Lahuta	
United States	Sydney Rose Salinas	
Venezuela	Johanna Aponte	
Vietnam	Nguyễn Thanh Hà	19
