= Sarah Archer (model) =

British model and actress

Lady Sarah Archer
- Born: 29 October 1990 (age 36); Portsmouth, Hampshire, United Kingdom
- Citizenship: British
- Occupations: Actress, Model
- Modeling information
- Height: 5 ft 8 in (1.73 m)
- Hair color: Dark Brown
- Agency: Cohen (Chancery Talent)
- Website: http://www.saraharchers.com/

Lady Sarah Archer is a British actress, model and beauty pageant titleholder. In 2014 Sarah was the chosen candidate to be crowned Miss United Kingdom Beautiful.

== Early life ==
Lady Archer from a very young age enjoyed participating in social debate and when the opportunity came for her to be part of the UK youth parliament she ran for a seat. After she had her manifesto written, she went around schools and local youth clubs in Westminster asking for their support. Sarah Archer became deputy youth MP to Westminster Council then continuing to work with the UK youth parliament as a member. Sarah went on to become a police cadet which aided her in finishing her Duke of Edinburgh Gold award.

== Career ==
Archer took time off acting to complete her educational courses. She started to pursue her childhood dream in the movie business that had been on hold to whilst she focused on her studies. Moreover, because of Archer's diverse capability in production she is very sought after internationally, especially in the Middle East.

Archer has travelled to Egypt, Jordan, across Europe and the United States working with a variety of charities to shine light on their contribution to society. Her main priority is to work with people around the world to improve education and well-being for children and women. She emphasises that the lack of opportunity should not hold anyone back. Sarah Archer is also works with blood banks around the world promoting and educating people about donating blood, donating blood herself.

== Sport ==
Archer has always participated in sport; in secondary school she was on the swimming and basketball team and she later went on to find that her real passion is running. She has competed in many marathons from around the world.

In 2015, she started filming Goz Hendi in Cairo, Egypt with Mostafa Shaban, an Egyptian in the lead role.

== Awards ==
Sarah Archer won the title of Miss Portsmouth 2008 making her one of the finalists in the Miss England Competition. In the finals she was in the top ten in the talent category and came second out of 50 contestants in the public voting which consisted of 2300 votes.

In 2014 Archer was the chosen candidate to be crowned Miss United Kingdom Beautiful to compete in the Grand Finals, in Hollywood Florida. Sarah Miss Congeniality and came third runner-up in international final.
