= Patrisha Rimfire =

Slovenian singer, model and a pageant titleholder

Patricia Peklar
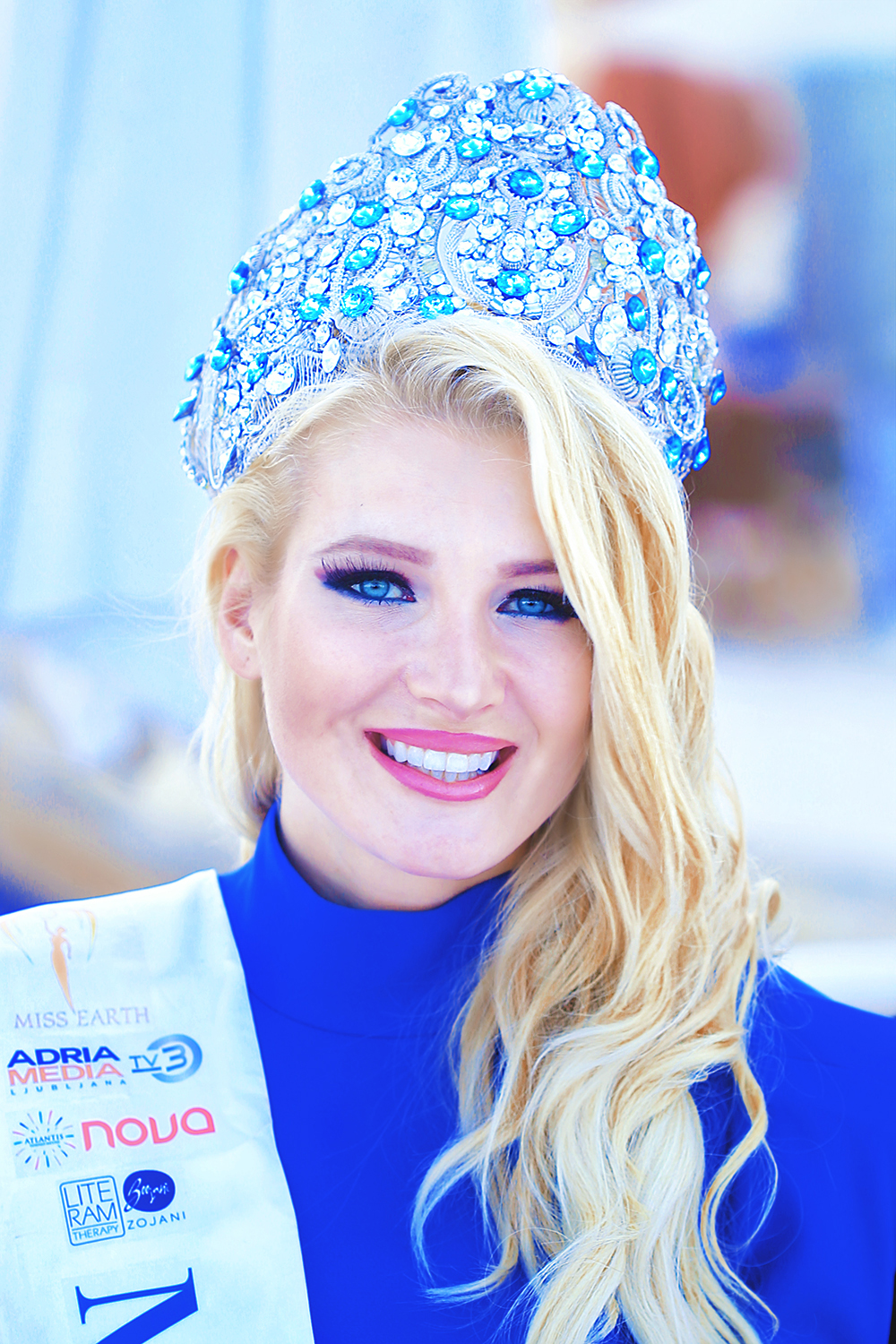
- Peklar in 2015
- Born: Patricija Peklar; June 4, 1989 (age 36); Vransko, Slovenia
- Other name: Patrisha Rimfire
- Occupations: Model; singer
- Years active: 2011–present
- Title: Miss Soče 2011; Miss Earth Slovenia 2014; Miss Eco International 2015
- Military career
- Allegiance: Slovenia
- Branch: Slovenian Armed Forces
- Service years: 2023–2024

Patricia Peklar (born June 4, 1989) popularly known as Patrisha Rimfire is a Slovenian singer, model and a beauty pageant titleholder. She is the first Miss Eco International (formerly Miss Eco Queen) titleholder in 2015.

== Career ==
Peklar, representing Slovenia in the Miss Earth 2014 pageant, where she advocated for environmental protection by promoting sustainable practices such as recycling, reducing car usage, and appreciating nature's role in human well-being.

Transitioning to music under her stage name, Rimfire has released several pop singles and albums, including Pressure in 2018 and Down For Me in 2021, blending electronic elements with mainstream pop influences. Her work is available on major streaming platforms, showcasing her as an emerging artist in the Slovenian and international music scene.

Awards and achievements
Preceded by First	Miss Eco International; 2015	Succeeded by (Costa Rica) Natalia Carvajal
