= Nguyễn Thanh Hà =

Vietnamese female model and pageant titleholder

Nguyen Thanh Ha
- Born: Nguyễn Thanh Hà; August 4, 2004 (age 22); Bến Tre, Vietnam
- Other name: Than Hà
- Occupations: Model; beauty queen
- Beauty pageant titleholder
- Title: Miss Eco International 2023
- Major competitions: Miss Environment Vietnam 2022; (Winner); (Media Beauty); Miss Eco International 2023; (Winner); (Best Eco Dress)

Nguyễn Thanh Hà (born August 4, 2004) is a Vietnamese model and a beauty pageant titleholder. She was crowned Miss Environment Vietnam 2022. Therefore, she became the representative of Vietnam at Miss Eco International 2023 and was crowned as Miss Eco International 2023 along with the special award in Best Eco Dress.

== Pageantry ==
=== Miss Environment Vietnam 2022 ===
Thanh Ha was crowned as the winner of the Miss Environment Vietnam 2022 and was awarded "Media Beauty" also on the final night. She was chosen to represent Vietnam at Miss Eco International 2023.

=== Miss Eco International 2023 ===
In 2023, she represented Vietnam at the Miss Eco International pageant in Cairo, Egypt. In the semi-finals, she received the Best Eco Dress award and was chosen as one of the top 11 finalists. At the end of the event, she defeated 39 other contenders and was crowned Miss Eco International 2023, becoming the first Vietnamese woman to win the pageant.

Awards and achievements
Preceded by (Philippines) Kathlenen Joy Paton	Miss Eco International; 2023	Succeeded by (Ukraine) Angelina Usanova
Preceded by Trần Hoài Phương	Miss Eco Vietnam; 2023	Succeeded by Hoàng Thị Kim Chi
