= Angelina Usanova =

Ukrainian model and musician

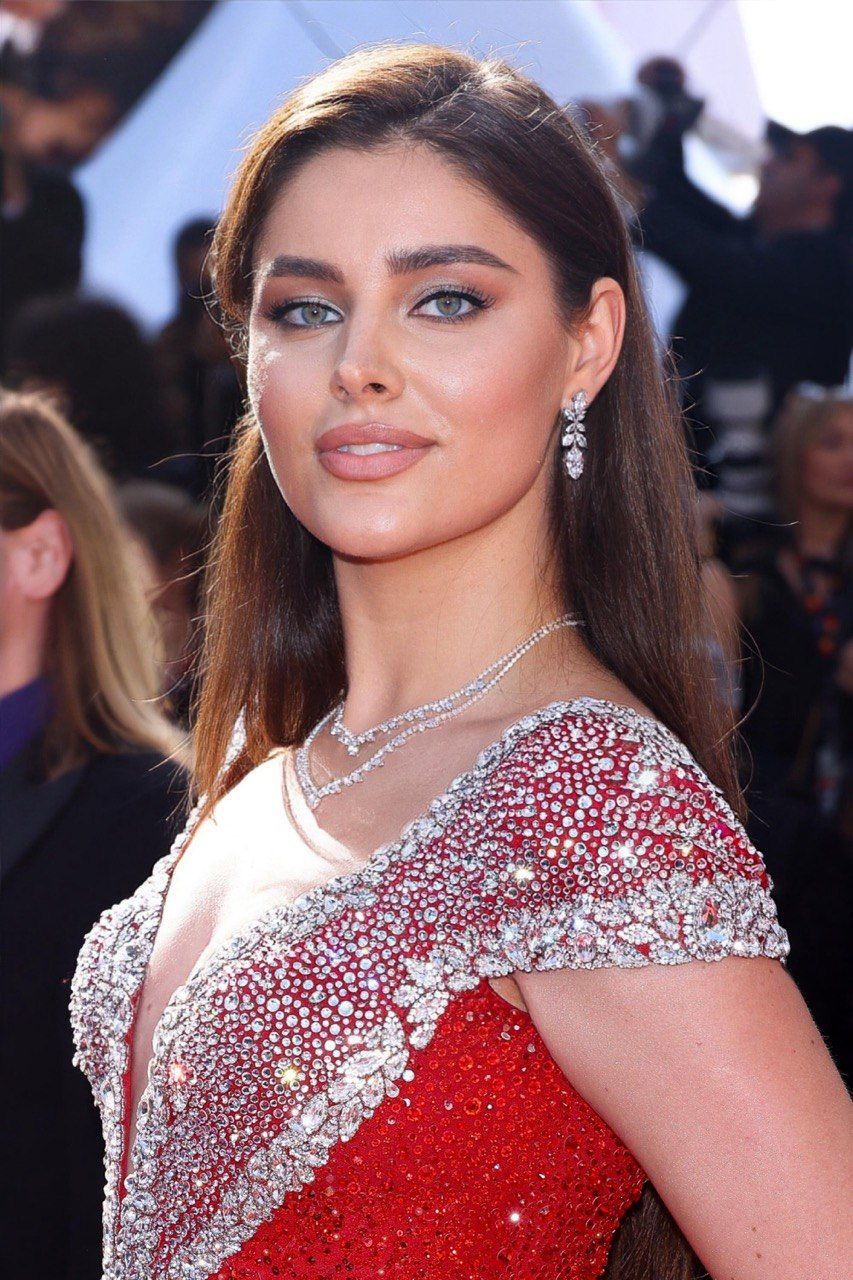
- Born: 7 August 1997 (age 29); Kyiv, Ukraine
- Occupations: Singer, actress, entrepreneur, philanthropist
- Height: 1.73 m (5 ft 8 in)
- Beauty pageant titleholder
- Title: Miss Ukraine Universe 2023; Miss Eco International 2024
- Major competitions: Miss Ukraine Universe 2023 (Winner); Miss Universe 2023 (Unplaced); Miss Eco International 2024 (Winner)

Angelina Usanova (Ukrainian: Ангеліна Усанова; born 7 August 1997) is a Ukrainian beauty queen who was crowned Miss Ukraine Universe 2023 and represented her country at Miss Universe 2023 in El Salvador. She later won Miss Eco International 2024 in Egypt, becoming the first woman from Ukraine to hold the title.

Usanova is the founder of the Angelina Usanova Foundation and the children's charity music festival HumanKind Fest. She is also the author of children's books My Home (2023) and Intergalactic Friendship (2024).

== Early life and education ==
Usanova was born in 1997 in Kyiv into a family of educators. She attended Peace School No. 211 in Kyiv, a school affiliated with UNESCO educational initiatives.

In 2012, she led the Ukrainian team in the European Schools for a Living Planet project organized by the World Wildlife Fund (WWF) and Erste Foundation, which involved students from ten European countries implementing environmental conservation projects. The Ukrainian team won first place.

Alongside general education, she studied piano and composition from the age of seven and graduated from music school with a Gold Medal.

== Pageantry ==
=== Miss Ukraine Universe 2023 ===
Usanova was officially crowned Miss Universe Ukraine 2023 and was succeeded by Viktoria Apanasenko. She represented Ukraine at the 72nd Miss Universe competition and competed against 84 other candidates at the José Adolfo Pineda Arena in San Salvador, El Salvador, but she was unplaced.

=== Miss Eco International 2024 ===
On April 28, 2024, Usanova also represented Ukraine at Miss Eco International 2024 and competed against 42 other candidates at the Triumph Luxury Hotel in Cairo, Egypt. At the end of the event, she was crowned as the winner and was succeeded by Nguyễn Thanh Hà of Vietnam.

== Philanthropy ==
=== Angelina Usanova Foundation ===
In 2024, Usanova founded the Angelina Usanova Foundation, a humanitarian and eco-educational organization. The foundation has organized charity galas abroad to raise funds for Ukrainian humanitarian causes.

=== HumanKind Fest ===
The foundation organizes HumanKind Fest, a children's charity music festival held in Kyiv. The first edition took place on 2 December 2024 at the Caribbean Club concert hall, featuring ten young finalists aged 10 to 14 from across Ukraine performing on a professional stage. Three editions of the festival were held between 2024 and 2025.

=== City of Goodness (Misto Dobra) ===
Usanova has maintained cooperation with the City of Goodness (Misto Dobra), a children's medical center in the Chernivtsi region. In February 2025, she was named Official Ambassador of the City of Goodness. From December 2024 to January 2025, the foundation supported the photography exhibition "Seen Through the Heart" at Ukrainian House in Kyiv, dedicated to the memory of six-year-old Sonya Liakh, a young photographer and former patient at the City of Goodness.

=== "Rebirth" Fountain ===
In 2023–2024, Usanova initiated the reconstruction of a fountain at the M.M. Hryshko National Botanical Garden in Kyiv. The project, titled "Rebirth" (Vidrodzhennia), included a light-dynamic fountain featuring a sculptural composition with a golden lotus and the inscription "Let there be peace in the whole world" in eight languages.

=== Animal welfare ===
The foundation collaborates with UAnimals and became General Partner of the UAnimals Animal Protection Award in 2025.

== Charity work ==
Usanova has organised housing for Ukrainian refugees in Europe, provided moral support to war victims through yoga, meditation and sound healing, and raised and donated funds to buy cars for the Rapid Evacuation project at the front.

== Music ==
Usanova is a singer, songwriter, and pianist who has released several original songs addressing environmental and humanitarian themes. Her single "Earth", released in April 2024, was accompanied by a music video filmed at the National Library of Ukraine and addressed the theme of environmental preservation. The video was named "Music Video of the Week" by the Berlin Music Video Awards and received recognition at the New York International Film Awards and the Onyros Film Awards.

== Film ==
Usanova plays the leading female role in GUR: Code Sikora (Ukrainian: ГУР: Код «Сікора»), a spy drama about the special operations of Ukraine's Main Intelligence Directorate (GUR), directed by Akhtem Seitablayev. The film, produced by F Films with the support of the Ukrainian State Film Agency, is based on real events and is scheduled for release in 2026. The film's teaser was presented at the Marché du Film of the 78th Cannes Film Festival in May 2025.

== Books ==
Usanova is the author of children's books My Home (2023), which introduces themes of environmental awareness, and Intergalactic Friendship (2024), which explores empathy and interpersonal connection.

== Yoga ==
Usanova is a certified yoga instructor who completed training at Sivananda Ashram in Austria and continued studies in the Himalayas (India), where she earned the title Yoga Acharya.

== Media ==
Usanova has been featured in international editions of Vogue and L'Officiel, including interviews with Vogue Portugal and Vogue Czech Republic addressing her environmental advocacy.

== Awards and recognition ==
- In May 2024, Usanova was recognized at the World Influencer Business Awards (WIBA) in Cannes as "Social Activity & Philanthropy Influencer".
- In June 2024, Ukrainian media reported that she received the Order of Queen Anna ("Honor of the Homeland") and the Order of Saint Sophia for her charitable work.
- In October 2025, she received the Sustainable Warrior Award from CIRCLE X's Green Trillion Club in Paris.
- In October 2025, she served as Honorary Patron of the Monte Carlo Beach Cup in Monaco, presenting trophies at the event.

Awards and achievements
| Preceded by (Vietnam) Nguyễn Thanh Hà | Miss Eco International; 2024 | Succeeded by (Philippines) Alexie Brooks |
| Preceded by Anastasiia Lahuta | Miss Eco Ukraine; 2024 | Succeeded by Yelyzaveta Adams |
| Preceded by Viktoria Apanasenko | Miss Ukraine Universe; 2023 | Succeeded by Alina Ponomarenko |
