= Natalia Carvajal =

Costa Rican communications professional and beauty pageant titleholder

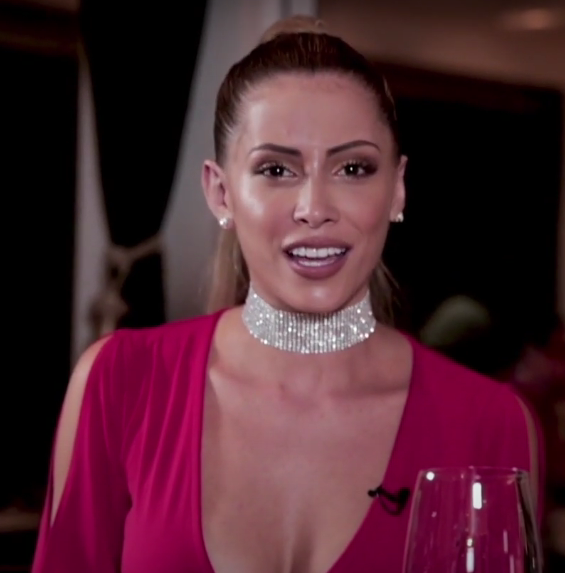
- Born: Natalia Carvajal; 14 September 1990 (age 36); Escazú, Costa Rica
- Height: 1.73 m (5 ft 8 in)
- Beauty pageant titleholder
- Title: Miss Costa Rica 2018
- Hair color: Blonde
- Eye color: Brown
- Major competitions: Miss Eco International 2016 (Winner); Miss Costa Rica 2018 (Winner); Miss Universe 2018 (Top 10)

Natalia Carvajal Sánchez (born September 14, 1990) is a Costa Rican model and beauty pageant titleholder who won the Miss Universe Costa Rica 2018. She represented Costa Rica at Miss Universe 2018, and placed in the Top 10 semifinalists.

== Pageantry ==
=== Miss Eco International 2016 ===
Carvajal was crowned as Miss Eco International 2016.

=== Miss Costa Rica 2018 ===
Carvajal was crowned as Miss Costa Rica 2018 and she succeeded outgoing Miss Costa Rica 2017 Elena Correa.

=== Miss Universe 2018 ===
Carvajal represented Costa Rica at Miss Universe 2018 pageant in Bangkok, Thailand. She placed in Top 10.

Awards and achievements
Preceded by (Slovenia) Patricia Peklar	Miss Eco International; 2016	Succeeded by (Canada) Amber Bernachi
Preceded by Elena Correa Usuga	Miss Costa Rica; 2018	Succeeded by Paola Chacón
