= Binibining Pilipinas 2024 =

60th Binibining Pilipinas pageant

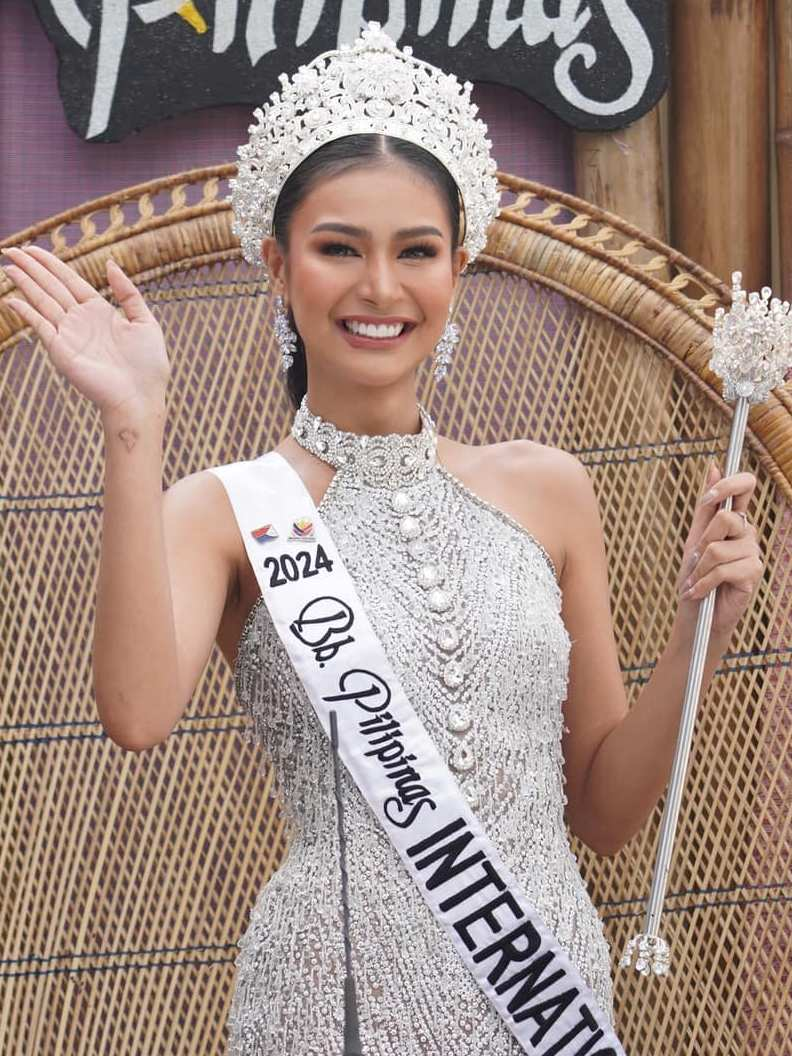
- Myrna Esguerra
- Date: July 7, 2024
- Hosts: Catriona Gray; Kylie Verzosa; Mary Jean Lastimosa; Nicole Cordoves; Ruffa Gutierrez
- Entertainment: SB19; Gary Valenciano; Martin Nievera; TJ Monterde; Maki
- Theme: Beauty Ever After
- Venue: Smart Araneta Coliseum, Quezon City, Philippines
- Broadcaster: TV5; ABS-CBN; A2Z; Kapamilya Channel; Metro Channel
- Entrants: 40
- Placements: 15
- Winner: Myrna Esguerra; Abra
- Congeniality: Roselyn Evardo; Manila
- Best National Costume: Myrna Esguerra; Abra; Zianah Joy Famy; Cavite; Monica Acuno; Kalayaan, Laguna; Myrea Caccam; Oriental Mindoro; Joyce Garduque; Quezon
- Photogenic: Maria Flordeliz Mabao; Rizal
- Opening trailer: Win Your Heart

Binibining Pilipinas 2024 (billed as the Diamond Edition) was the 60th edition of the Binibining Pilipinas pageant, held at the Smart Araneta Coliseum in Quezon City, Philippines, on July 7, 2024.

At the end of the event, Angelica Lopez of Palawan crowned Myrna Esguerra of Abra as Binibining Pilipinas International 2024 and Anna Lakrini crowned Jasmin Bungay of Pampanga as Binibining Pilipinas Globe 2024. Christal Jean dela Cruz of Zambales was named first runner-up, and Trisha Martinez of Pila, Laguna was named second runner-up.

Forty contestants competed in this edition. The competition was presented by Miss Universe 2018 Catriona Gray, Miss International 2016 Kylie Verzosa, Miss Universe Philippines 2014 Mary Jean Lastimosa, Miss Grand International 2016 first runner-up Nicole Cordoves, and Miss World 1993 second princess Ruffa Gutierrez. The competition also featured the debut of the new crowns designed by Filipino jewelry maker Manny Halasan.

== Pageant ==
=== Selection of participants ===
On February 13, 2024, the organization launched its search for the next set of candidates who will represent the Philippines at different international pageants. The final submission of the application was on March 22, 2024. The final screening and selection of the official contestants were conducted on April 5, 2024.

=== Selection committee ===
For the first time in the pageant's history, an all-woman panel served as members of Binibining Pilipinas 2024 board of judges:

- Conchitina Sevilla-Bernardo — Member of Binibining Pilipinas executive committee, chairman of the board of judges
- Rhea Tan — Beauty and wellness entrepreneur
- Bea Santiago — Miss International 2013
- Fifi Sharma — Volleyball player
- Pia Wurtzbach — Miss Universe 2015
- Gloria Diaz — Miss Universe 1969
- Andrea Rubio — Miss International 2023 from Venezuela
- Margarita Moran — Miss Universe 1973

== Results ==
=== Placements ===
Placement	Contestant	International placement
Binibining Pilipinas International 2024	Bb. #40 Abra – Myrna Esguerra	4th Runner-Up – Miss International 2025
Binibining Pilipinas Globe 2024	Bb. #21 Pampanga – Jasmin Bungay	2nd Runner-Up – The Miss Globe 2024
1st runner-up	Bb. #10 Zambales – Christal Jean dela Cruz	
2nd runner-up	Bb. #30 Pila, Laguna – Trisha Martinez	
Top 15	Bb. #1 Baguio – Marikit Manaois; Bb. #11 Caloocan – Mae Kimberly de Luna; Bb. #13 Calumpit – Roella Solis; Bb. #14 Calamba, Laguna – Vienne Sirin Feucht; Bb. #20 General Santos – Shannen Manzano; Bb. #22 Bacolod – Tracy Sunio; Bb. #24 Kalayaan, Laguna – Monica Acuno; Bb. #25 Negros Occidental – Kara Daniella Villarosa; Bb. #26 Lapu Lapu City, Cebu – Phoebe Godinez; Bb. #32 Aurora – Carmella Joy Cuaresma; Bb. #36 Bulacan – Samantha Viktoria Acosta §	

§ – Fan-vote winner from Playtime; dubbed as Playtime Binibini

=== Special awards ===
Awards	Contestant
Best in Swimsuit	Bb. #40 Abra – Myrna Esguerra
Best in Evening Gown	Bb. #40 Abra – Myrna Esguerra
Bb. Urban Smiles	Bb. #40 Abra – Myrna Esguerra
Bb. Philippine Airlines	Bb. #40 Abra – Myrna Esguerra
Face of Binibini (Miss Photogenic)	Bb. #39 Rizal – Maria Flordeliz Mabao
Bb. Friendship	Bb. #29 Manila – Roselyn Evardo
Best National Costume	Bb. #16 Oriental Mindoro – Myrea Manely Caccam; Bb. #23 Quezon – Joyce Anne Garduque; Bb. #24 Kalayaan – Monica Acuno; Bb. #31 Cavite – Zianah Joy Famy; Bb. #40 Abra – Myrna Esguerra
Bb. Cream Silk	Bb. #10 Zambales – Christal Jean de la Cruz
Bb. Pizza Hut	Bb. #10 Zambales – Christal Jean de la Cruz
Bb. Ever Bilena	Bb. #10 Zambales – Christal Jean de la Cruz
Bb. Beautederm	Bb. #10 Zambales – Christal Jean de la Cruz
Manila Bulletin Readers' Choice	Bb. #11 Caloocan – Mae Kimberly de Luna
Playtime Binibini	Bb. #36 Bulacan – Samantha Viktoria Acosta
Miss Healthy and Pure	Bb. #6 Quezon City – Kristin Baconawa
World Vision Ambassadors for Children	Bb. #20 General Santos – Shannen Manzano; Bb. #36 Bulacan – Samantha Viktoria Acosta
Miss Biodiversity	Bb. #1 Baguio – Marikit Manaois

== Contestants ==
Forty candidates completed for the two titles.

No.	Locality	Contestant	Age (Note: Ages at the time of the pageant)	Notes
1	Baguio	Marikit Manaois	27	Won Aliwan Fiesta Digital Queen 2022
2	Taguig	Corrine San Pedro	22	
3	Lipa	Charisse Anthea Abanico	21	Top 21 semi-finalist at Mutya ng Pilipinas 2022
4	Mandaluyong	Shaira Marie Rona	25	Competed at Binibining Pilipinas 2021
5	Iloilo	Nicklyn Jutay	22	Later Completed at Miss Universe Philippines 2026
6	Quezon City	Kristin Wyeth Marie Baconawa	26	Competed at Miss Universe Philippines-Quezon City 2024
7	Biñan	Jasmin Denise Dingson	27	
8	Camiguin	Maria Abegail Jajalla	20	
9	Lucena	Gracelle Nicole Distura	24	Competed at Miss Universe Philippines 2022
10	Zambales	Christal Jean dela Cruz	19	
11	Caloocan	Mae Kimberly de Luna	27	Competed at Mutya ng Pilipinas 2018
12	Mandaluyong (Buayang Bato)	Sheryl Velez	27	Competed at Miss CosmoWorld Philippines 2023.
13	Calumpit	Roella Frias Solis	26	Top 13 Semifinalist at Miss CosmoWorld Philippines 2023
14	Calamba	Vienne Sirin Feucht	22	Won Miss Rotary 2023
15	Bukidnon	Sheny Sampang	20	
16	Oriental Mindoro	Myrea Manely Caccam	23	Later Top 15 semi-finalist at Miss Philippines Earth 2025<be>Top 21 semifinalist at Mutya ng Pilipinas 2025
17	Los Baños	Rendelle Ann Caraig	24	Finalist at Supermodel International Philippines 2023; Competed at Miss Universe Philippines 2025
18	Misamis Oriental	Mythosela Villanueva	26	Competed at Miss Philippines Earth 2023
19	Ormoc	Liezle Nikki Jones	22	
20	General Santos	Shannen Manzano	19	Top 24 semi-finalist at Miss World Philippines 2021
21	Pampanga	Jasmin Bungay	26	
22	Bacolod	Tracy Mae Sunio	24	Later Completed at Binibining Pilipinas 2026
23	Quezon	Joyce Anne Garduque	22	Top 100 finalist at Miss Universe Philippines 2021 representing Sorsogon
24	Kalayaan	Monica Acuno	24	
25	Negros Occidental	Kara Daniela Villarosa	23	
26	Lapu-Lapu	Phoebe Godinez	25	Previously Hiyas ng Pilipinas Queen International 2022
27	Parañaque	Aleckxis Maryannza Chuidian	23	
28	Isabela	Zeneth Joy Khan	25	Top 20 semi-finalist at Miss Philippines Earth 2021
29	Manila	Roselyn Evardo	28	
30	Pila	Trisha Martinez	26	Previously Miss Tourism Philippines 2021; Top 11 semi-finalist at Binibining Pilipinas 2023
31	Cavite	Zianah Joy Famy	23	
32	Aurora	Carmella Joy Cuaresma	24	Top 13 semifinalist at Miss CosmoWorld Philippines 2023
33	Pasig	Erika Cassandra Ballon	20	
34	Tarlac	Vera Corine Dickinson	20	
35	Zamboanga City	Kylie Anne Atilano	22	Later Completed at Miss Philippines Earth 2025
36	Bulacan	Samantha Viktoria Acosta	26	Competed at Miss Philippines Earth 2017
37	Tanauan	Trisha Bless Hernandez	25	
38	Batangas City	Geraldine Buenafe	25	Later Completed at Mutya ng Pilipinas 2025
39	Rizal	Maria Flordeliz Mabao	26	Top 21 semi-finalist at Mutya ng Pilipinas 2022Later Elemental Titleholder at Miss Philippines Earth 2025
40	Abra	Myrna Esguerra	22	
