= Reina Filipinas 2026 =

First Reina Filipinas competition, beauty pageant edition

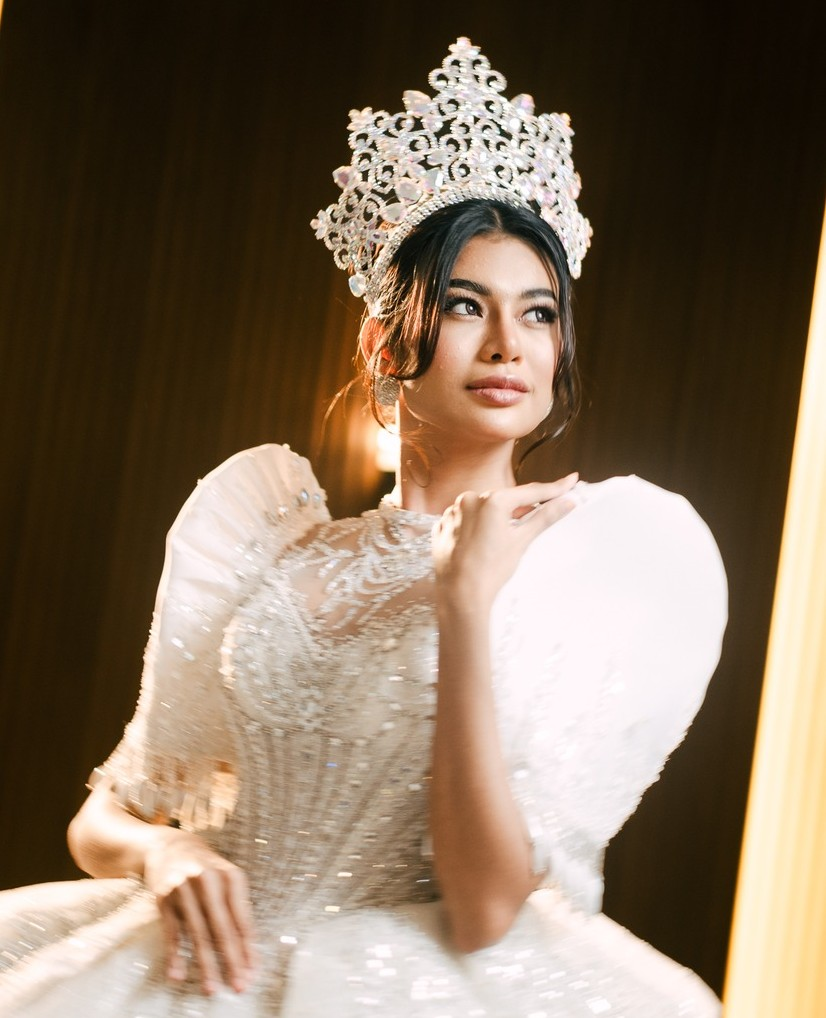
- Angelica Lopez
- Date: August 7, 2026
- Hosts: Joy Barcoma; Sean Kyle Ortega
- Venue: Newport Performing Arts Theater, Pasay
- Entrants: 21
- Placements: 11
- Debuts: Bataan; Bulacan; Caloocan; Camarines Sur; Ilocos Sur; Iloilo City; Koronadal; La Union; Mandaluyong; Manila; Mariveles; Muntinlupa; Nueva Ecija; Palawan; Pampanga; Pangasinan; Pateros; Quezon City; Rizal; San Mateo, Rizal; Zambales
- Winner: Angelica Lopez; Palawan
- Photogenic: Cleopatra Barrera, Zambales

Reina Filipinas 2026 was the inaugural edition of the Reina Filipinas pageant, held on August 7, 2026, at the Newport Performing Arts Theater in Pasay. The competition was presented by Joy Barcoma and Sean Kyle Ortega, with a backstage segment hosted by MGI All Stars alumnae Gazini Ganados and Fuschia Anne Ravena.

Three winners were named at the end of the competition. Emma Tiglao of Pampanga crowned Angelica Lopez of Palawan as her successor. Lopez represented the Philippines at Miss Grand International 2026 on 10 October 2026, where she reached the Top 25. In addition, Anne Patricia Diaz of Manila and Alexie Brooks of Iloilo City were crowned as the Philippines' representatives to the second edition of MGI All Stars by Hương Giang and Vanessa Pulgarin, respectively. They will compete at the second edition of MGI All Stars, which will be held on 12 December 2026.

== Overview ==
=== Location ===
During the pageant's launch on June 10, 2026, the organizers announced that the coronation night was scheduled for August 7, 2026 at the Newport Performing Arts Theater in Pasay.

=== Selection of participants ===
On June 16, 2026, the pageant opened its applications for aspiring candidates its inaugural first edition, which ran through June 30. Face-to-face applications and screenings were also held in parallels Scout Borromeo, Quezon City.

The applicants underwent a final screening on July 3, with the schedule for the introduction and sashing ceremony of the final 21 delegates scheduled for July 8 in Silang, Cavite. In response to inclement weather caused by Typhoon Bavi, the event was postponed to July 13. In light of the postponement, the 21 candidates were revealed through a series of short video clips, were released sequentially from July 6 to 10.

== Pageant ==
=== Format ===
The delegates competed for three titles, qualifying one contestant to Miss Grand International and two to its all-star spinoff.

=== Judges ===
- Michael Cinco – fashion designer
- Ralph Figueroa Delas Alas – president and co-founder of Urban Smiles Dental Clinic, The Med Club Diagnostics, and Eons Health
- Hương Giang – winner of Miss International Queen 2018 and second runner-up of MGI All Stars 1st Edition from Vietnam
- CJ Opiaza – winner of Miss Grand International 2024 from the Philippines
- Leo Ortiz – chief executive officer and owner of Beauty Vault
- Sarunrat Puagpipat – first runner-up at Miss Grand International 2025 from Thailand
- Vanessa Pulgarin – winner of MGI All Stars 1st Edition from Colombia

=== Presenters ===
The final telecast was presented by pageant personalities Joy Barcoma and Sean Kyle Ortega, with MGI All Stars alumnae Gazini Ganados and Fuschia Anne Ravena serving as backstage hosts.

== Results ==
=== Placements ===
Placement	Contestant	International Placement
Reina Filipinas Grand International 2026	Palawan – Angelica Lopez	Top 25 – Miss Grand International 2026
Reina Filipinas MGI All Stars	Iloilo City – Alexie Brooks (Note: Advanced to the Top 7 as the winner of the Best Seller Award)	TBD – MGI All Stars 2nd Edition
Reina Filipinas MGI All Stars	Manila – Anne Patricia Diaz	TBD – MGI All Stars 2nd Edition
1st Runner-Up	Zambales – Cleopatra Barrera	
2nd Runner-Up	Camarines Sur – Isabella Ortega	
3rd Runner-Up	Mandaluyong – Zeah Nestle Pala	
4th Runner-Up	Caloocan – Luisa Benavides (Note: Voted into the Top 7 by viewers and awarded as Miss Popular Vote)	
Top 11	Bulacan – Bianca Bautista (Note: Automatically advanced to the Top 11 as winner of the Reina Dandy Glow award); Muntinlupa – Scarlett de Mesa; Nueva Ecija – Jesree Aguilar; Rizal – Jade Isabel Candilado; San Mateo, Rizal – Hanna Michaela Amistad	

==== Special awards ====
Award	Contestant
Reina Photogenic (Miss Photogenic)	Zambales – Cleopatra Barrera
Reina Pasarela (Best in Pasarela)	Palawan – Angelica Lopez
Best in Swimsuit	Palawan – Angelica Lopez
Best in Evening Gown	Iloilo City – Alexie Brooks
Best Seller	Iloilo City – Alexie Brooks
Miss Popular Vote	Caloocan – Luisa Benavides

==== Sponsor awards ====
Award	Contestant
Reina Dandy Glow	Bulacan – Bianca Bautista
Reina Beauty Vault	Muntinlupa – Scarlett de Mesa
Reina KSerene	Iloilo City – Alexie Brooks
Reina Urban Smiles	Palawan – Angelica Lopez

== Contestants ==
Twenty-one contestants competed for the three titles.

Locality	Contestant	Notes
Bataan	Vherciandy Santos	
Bulacan	Bianca Mae Bautista	
Caloocan	Luisa Lorin Benavides	
Camarines Sur	Isabella Ortega	
Ilocos Sur	Ronalyn Valeza	
Iloilo City	Alexie Brooks	Top 10 at Miss Universe Philippines 2024; Winner of Miss Eco International 2025
Koronadal	Frezle Juana Verzo	
La Union	Reign Gale Nejal	
Mandaluyong	Zeah Nestle Pala	Winner of Sexy Babe 2025 of It's Showtime
Manila	Anne Patricia Diaz	Winner of Miss International Queen Philippines 2025; Top 6 at Miss International Queen 2025
Mariveles	Cassandra De Jesus	
Muntinlupa	Scarlett de Mesa	Supplemental titleholder at Top Model of the World 2025; Competed at Miss Universe Philippines 2026, representing Los Baños, Laguna
Nueva Ecija	Jesree Einz Aguilar	
Palawan	Angelica Lopez	Top 16 at Miss Universe Philippines 2022; 1st Runner-Up at Miss Asia Global 2022; Winner of Binibining Pilipinas International 2023; Competed at Miss International 2024
Pampanga	Sahara Bernales	VMX actress
Pangasinan	Shaira May Soria	
Pateros	Kristen Marcelino	Competed at Miss Universe Philippines 2026
Quezon City	Precious Faith Paulo	
Rizal	Jade Isabel Candilado	
San Mateo, Rizal	Hanna Michaela Amistad	
Zambales	Cleopatra Barrera	
