= Katrina Johnson =

Filipino model and beauty pageant titleholder

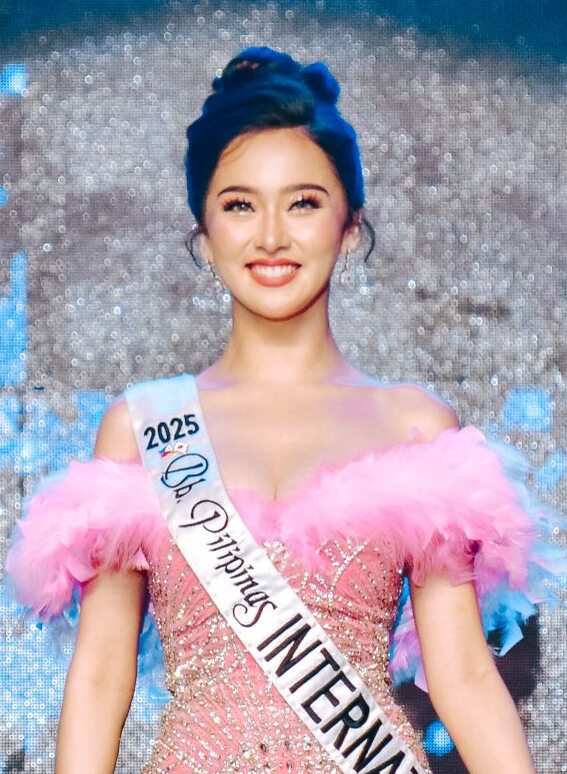
- Johnson in 2025
- Born: Katrina Anne Castañeda Johnson; January 26, 1998 (age 28); Davao City, Philippines
- Education: University of the Immaculate Conception (BS)
- Occupations: Beauty pageant titleholder; pharmacist
- Height: 1.72 m (5 ft 8 in)
- Beauty pageant titleholder
- Title: Binibining Pilipinas International 2025
- Major competitions: Binibining Pilipinas 2023; (1st Runner-Up); Binibining Pilipinas 2025; (Winner – Binibining Pilipinas International 2025); Miss International 2026; (TBD)

Katrina Anne Castañeda Johnson (born January 26, 1998) is a Filipino beauty pageant titleholder who won the title Binibining Pilipinas International 2025. She will represent the Philippines at the Miss International 2026 pageant.

Johnson previously competed at Binibining Pilipinas 2023, where she finished as the first runner-up.

== Early life and education ==
Johnson was born on January 26, 1998, to a Filipino mother, Melody, and an American father living in the United States. She cites her mother as an inspiration in competing in beauty pageants, as her mother dreamed of competing in Binibining Pilipinas during her youth but never had the opportunity to do so.

Johnson studied pharmacy at the University of the Immaculate Conception, majoring in clinical pharmacy. In 2015, during her freshman year, her program's department designated her as their representative in a university-wide pageant that she later won, allowing her to represent the institution in a Davao-based inter-school pageant where she achieved the same result.

== Pageantry ==
Johnson entered national pageantry with Miss Silka Philippines 2016, where she won the main title, becoming the pageant's first titleholder from Mindanao.

=== Binibining Pilipinas 2023 ===
Johnson competed at the Binibining Pilipinas 2023 pageant, representing Davao del Sur. During the preliminary rounds for the contest, she won one special award from the pageant's sponsors. She progressed to the top 11 question-and-answer round, where actor Piolo Pascual asked her about the personal values that she is "unapologetic" about. In her answer, she mentioned her "authenticity, honesty, and sincerity", which she credited to her parents.

At the end of the event, Johnson was announced as the first runner-up to winners Angelica Lopez and Anna Lakrini.

=== Binibining Pilipinas 2025 ===
Johnson returned for Binibining Pilipinas 2025 as the delegate of Davao. (Note: Erroneously labeled as Davao Province, which has been defunct since 1967.) Leading up to the competition, media outlets viewed her as a leading contender for the crown, owing to her doll-like features and pageant experience. Like in her previous stint, she won one special award from the pageant's sponsors in the preliminary contest.

During the coronation night, she received the Best in Evening Gown award and then progressed to the top 14 question-and-answer round. During the segment, MTRCB Chairperson Lala Sotto asked her about her thoughts on the quote "lies told a thousand times become the truth" in relation to the proliferation of fake news in the Philippines. In her answer, she stressed the importance of teaching critical thinking and the regulation of online communities.

Johnson went on to win the pageant, being crowned Binibining Pilipinas International 2025 by her predecessor, Myrna Esguerra of Abra. She is the first representative from the Davao Region to have won this title.

=== Miss International 2026 ===
As a national titleholder, Johnson is representing the Philippines at Miss International 2026. In the events leading up to the finals, she won one special award: "Miss Visit Japan".

== Advocacies ==
Drawing from her background as a pharmacist, Johnson advocates for accessible, universal healthcare and has extended assistance in local medical charities in her area since 2016.

== Notes ==
Awards and achievements
| Preceded by Myrna Esguerra (Abra) | Binibining Pilipinas International; 2025 | Succeeded by Gwendoline Soriano (Baguio) |
| Preceded by Herlene Budol (Angono) | Binibining Pilipinas; 1st Runner-Up; 2023 | Succeeded by Christal dela Cruz (Zambales) |
