= Continental Miss World Philippines USA =

Continental Miss Philippines America
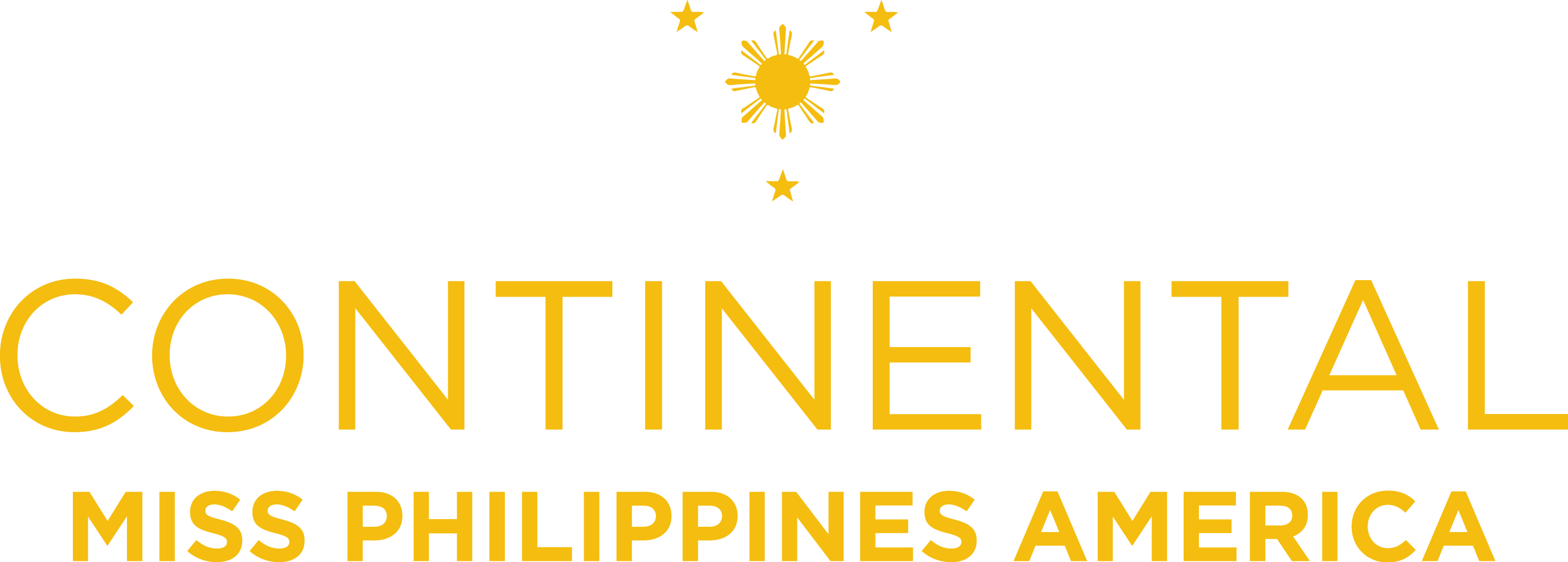
- Formation: 2018; 8 years ago
- Founder: Jo Verte
- Type: Beauty pageant
- Headquarters: Los Angeles, California
- Location: United States
- Official language: English
- National Director: Nate Calima (2018 - 2020)
- Representative Director (Philippines): Sean Michael Afable (2018 - 2020)
- Website: continentalmissphilippines.com

Continental Miss Philippines America is an annual beauty pageant, held in Los Angeles, California. It includes both Filipino-American representatives and Miss World Philippines contestants, and is in the lead up to Miss World, one of the Big Four international beauty pageants. Winning candidates from Continental Miss Philippines America are sent automatically and bypass the screening requirements. Their tagline is "the premier Filipino-American preliminary pageant to the most prestigious pageants in the Philippines".

The Pageant Chairman is Jo Verte, and the National Director was Nate Calima. Filipino-American Hollywood Actor and Miss World Philippines 2019 Judge Sean Michael Afable was proclaimed Representative Director of Philippines as of 2020.

== Continental Miss Philippines America 2018 ==
Continental Miss Philippines America 2018 Results
2018 Title	Name	Special Awards
Continental Miss Philippines America	Kimilei Mugford	Best in Evening Gown
Reina HispanoAmericano Filipinas	Cleopatra Jones	
Miss Philippines America E	Keena Mapanao	Miss Talent
Miss Multinational Philippines America	Erica Rose Madlangsakay	Miss Congeniality
Continental Miss Philippines America Petite	Alexys Ungria	
Continental Miss Philippines America Ambassador	Crystal Velasco Freedman	Best in Swimsuit
Community Ambassador	Emmeline Sturgeon	
Community Ambassador	Ashley Knowlton	
Community Ambassador	Angielyn Ruiz	
Continental Miss Teen Philippines America	Dru Mendez	
Continental Miss Teen Philippines America 1RU	Lynette Siahaan	
Continental Mr. Philippines USA	Nate Calima	

In 2018, three candidates were sent to Miss World Philippines from Continental Miss Philippines America: Kimilei Mugford, Cleopatra Jones, and Crystal Freedman. Kimilei Mugford was crowned Miss Multinational Philippines at Miss World Philippines 2018 and gave Continental its first major title wins in its first year of inception. Kimilei Mugford advanced to the Miss Multinational Pageant in India where she won Miss Multinational Asia & Oceana Post pageantry, Kimilei Mugford was included in the movie "Go! La Union" by ALV Films owned by Arnold L. Vegafria. Arnold L. Vegafria is also the incumbent National Director of Miss World Philippines.

== Continental Miss Philippines America 2019 ==
Nate Calima was appointed as National Director and a major sponsor in 2019. He was responsible for field operations, public relations, and coordination with Arnold "Mama Ru" Mercado (General Manager of Miss World Philippines).

Continental Miss Philippines America was held on July 20, 2019, at the Aratani Theater in Little Tokyo, Downtown Los Angeles. The hosts for this event were National Director Nate Calima and Miss Asia USA 2012 Christine Kan. Hosts for the Talent & Top Model was Sean Michael Afable and Miss Multinational Philippines America 2018 Erica Rose Madlangsakay. Poise, personality and Passarella training for 2019 was conducted by Bb Pilipinas International 2015 Janicel Lubina.

Continental Miss Philippines America 2019 Results
2019 Title	Name	Special Awards
Continental Miss Philippines America	Suzanne Perez	Best in Swimsuit, Nate Calima Brand Ambassador, Miss OC Facial, Miss Bintana ng Paraiso, Miss Red Inc
Reina Hispanoamericana Filipinas USA	Jena Masero	Best in Talent, People’s Choice⁣
Miss Eco Philippines USA	Kalea Pitel	Most Photogenic⁣⁣
Miss Multinational Philippines USA	Michelle Thorlund	Top Model, Best in Evening Gown⁣⁣
Continental Miss Philippines USA Petite	Michal Santos	
Continental Miss Philippines USA 1RU (1st Princess)	Alexandra Mae Dalumpines	Miss Congeniality, Best in Social Media, Best in National Costume
Continental Miss Philippines USA 2RU (2nd Princess)	Jossah Brizuela	
Continental 2019 Community Ambassador	Faith Tabayoyong	Best in Advocacy
Continental 2019 Community Ambassador	Angela Hilario	
Continental 2019 Community Ambassador	Jenice Domoal	
Continental Miss Teen Philippines America	Reniella Bulatao	Best in Swimsuit Teen, Best in Evening Gown Teen, Best in National Costume Teen
Continental Miss Teen Philippines America 1RU	Kayla Gonzaga Sosin	Top Model Teen
Continental Miss Teen Philippines America 2RU	Nicole Pelina	Best in Talent, People’s Choice, Miss Philippine Images
Continental Mr. World Philippines America	Daumier Corilla	
Continental Mr. World FIL-AM	Nate Calima	Permanent honorary title used for appearances when Continental Mr. World Philippines America is not available or out of the country.

Erica Rose Madlangsakay (Miss Multinational Philippines America 2018), Jena Masero (Reina Hispanoamericana Filipinas 2019), Kalea Pitel (Miss Eco Philippines America 2019), & Michelle Thorlund (Miss Multinational Philippines America 2019) was sent to Miss World Philippines 2019. Their official candidate numbers are #8 Kalea Pitel, #26 Michelle Thorlund, #32 Jena Masero, & #39 Erica Rose Madlangsakay. Kalea Pitel achieved Top 22, and Michelle Thorlund was Top 12 at Miss World Philippines 2019.

Daumier Corella originally was to be sent to Mr. World Philippines 2020 but opted to go to GLAM (Global Asian Models) instead because of the time gap. He was awarded Mr. Manhunt Philippines and he credits his start at Continental Mr. World Philippines USA.

Alexandra Mae Dalumpines was sent by the organization to the inaugural presentation of Philippine Global Queens. She won Miss Continental Philippines.

== Continental Miss Philippines America 2020 ==
Continental Miss Philippines America 2020 was postponed to Spring of 2021 due to the restrictions created by COVID19 pandemic as announced by National Director Nate Calima. Sean Michael Afable moved to the Philippines and has been elevated to Representative Director (Philippines) of Continental. He will be responsible for coordinating with Nate Calima in candidates that are sent there.
