= Miss World Philippines 2013 =

3rd Miss World Philippines pageant

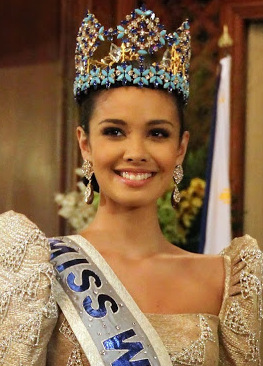
- Megan Lynne Young, Miss World Philippines 2013
- Date: August 18, 2013
- Presenters: Carla Abellana; KC Montero; Victor Basa; Gwendoline Ruais; Divine Lee
- Entertainment: Kris Lawrence; Kuh Ledesma; Tom Rodriguez; Dennis Trillo
- Venue: Solaire Resort & Casino, Parañaque, Philippines
- Broadcaster: GMA Network
- Entrants: 25
- Placements: 13
- Winner: Megan Young; Olongapo
- Congeniality: Zahra Bianca Saldua; Las Piñas
- Photogenic: Janicel Lubina; Palawan

Miss World Philippines 2013 was the third Miss World Philippines pageant, held at the Solaire Resort & Casino in Parañaque, Metro Manila, Philippines, on August 18, 2013.

At the end of the event, Queenierich Rehman crowned Megan Young as Miss World Philippines 2013. Janicel Lubina was named as First Princess, Zahra Bianca Saldua as Second Princess, Bianca Paz as Third Princess, and Omarie Linn Osuna as Fourth Princess.

Young was later crowned as Miss World 2013 in Bali, Indonesia making her the first woman from the Philippines to win the title of Miss World since its creation in 1951 and the Philippines' inception in 1966.

== Results ==
=== Placements ===
Color keys

- The contestant won in an international pageant.

Placement	Contestant	International Placement
Miss World Philippines 2013	#20 – Megan Lynne Young	Winner – Miss World 2013
1st Princess	#10 – Janicel Lubina	
2nd Princess	#5 – Zahra Bianca Saldua	
3rd Princess	#19 – Maria Paula Bianca Paz	
4th Princess	#18 – Omarie Linn Osuna	
Top 13	#6 – Karla Patricia Alas; #7 – Samantha Mae Bernardo; #11 – Mercegrace Raquel; #12 – Anjellica Lopez; #13 – Maria Paula Estenso; #17 – Jennifer Ruth Hammond; #22 – Patricia Lae Ejercitado; #24 – Zandra Flores	

=== Special awards ===
Award	Contestant(s)	Ref.
Best in Long Gown	#19 – Bianca Paz	
Best in Swimwear	#10 – Janicel Lubina	
Best in Fashion Runway	#20 – Megan Young	
Miss Sports by Fila	#20 – Megan Young	
Miss Photogenic	#10 – Janicel Lubina	
Miss Friendship	#5 – Zahra Bianca Saldua	
Best in Talent	#7 – Samantha Bernardo	
Miss World Laguna	#20 – Megan Young	
Miss World Traveller	#10 – Janicel Lubina	
Heart of Miss World Philippines Award	#6 – Karla Patricia Alas; #19 – Maria Paula Bianca Paz	
Miss Bold and Glamorous by Revlon	#20 – Megan Young	
Miss Prudential Life	#22 – Patricia Lae Ejercitado	
Miss Novu Hair	#22 – Patricia Lae Ejercitado	
Miss Redux Fat	#19 – Bianca Paz	
Miss Olay	#20 – Megan Young	
Miss Pantene	#5 – Zahra Bianca Saldua	
Miss Bench Body	#20 – Megan Young	

== Contestants ==
25 contestants competed for the title.

No.	Contestant	Age	Hometown
1	Henna Kaizzelle Nicole Cajandig	21	General Santos
2	Roselle Marie Ferrer	22	Valenzuela
3	Princesslyn Dignadice	24	Negros Occidental
4	Khadija Nasser	23	Rizal
5	Zahra Bianca Saldua	21	Las Piñas
6	Karla Patricia Alas	21	Las Piñas
7	Samantha Mae Bernardo	20	Puerto Princesa
8	Frances Claire Vintola	19	Dumaguete
9	Pia Kamil Ochengco	20	Caloocan
10	Janicel Lubina	18	Narra
11	Mercegrace Raquel	20	Santa Rosa
12	Anjellica Lopez	18	Pasay
13	Maria Paula Estenso	21	Caloocan
14	Vina Openiano	21	Santa Rosa
15	Maria Lily Teresa Salazar	21	Isabela
16	Aikah Dindah	18	Zamboanga City
17	Jennifer Ruth Hammond	22	Laguna
18	Omarie Linn Osuna	20	Olongapo
19	Maria Paula Bianca Paz	24	Nueva Ecija
20	Megan Lynne Young	23	Olongapo
21	Jennyline Carla Malpaya	22	Ilocos Sur
22	Patricia Lae Ejercitado	24	Cainta
23	Ria Rabajante	23	Oas
24	Zandra Flores	24	Pangasinan
25	Melanie Barret	23	Pampanga

== Notes ==
=== Post-pageant notes ===
- Megan Young competed at Miss World 2013 in Bali, Indonesia and won. Young is the first woman from the Philippines to win the title of Miss World.
- Janicel Lubina competed at Binibining Pilipinas 2015 and was crowned Binibining Pilipinas International 2015. She competed at Miss International 2015 in Tokyo, Japan and finished as one of the Top 10. Lubina also bagged the Miss Best Dresser award.
- Jennifer Ruth Hammond competed at Binibining Pilipinas 2016 and was crowned Binibining Pilipinas Intercontinental 2016. She competed at Miss Intercontinental 2016 in Colombo, Sri Lanka and finished as one of the Top 15.
- Samantha Bernardo competed at Binibining Pilipinas 2018 and Binibining Pilipinas 2019 where she was named Second Runner-Up in both editions of the pageant. Bernardo was supposed to compete at Binibining Pilipinas 2021 but was appointed as Binibining Pilipinas Grand International 2020 before the pageant was held. Bernardo competed at Miss Grand International 2020 and finished as First Runner-Up.
