= Alexie Brooks =

Filipino beauty pageant titleholder

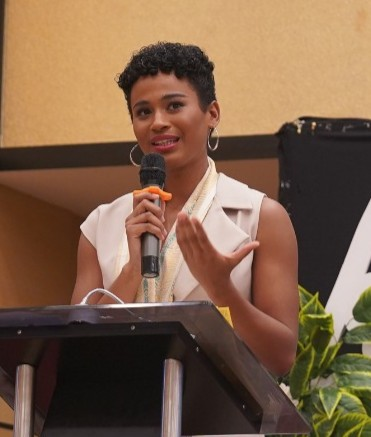
- Brooks in 2024
- Born: Alexie Mae Caimoso Brooks; February 21, 2001 (age 25); Lebanon
- Education: National University (B.S.)
- Beauty pageant titleholder
- Title: Miss Eco Philippines 2024; Miss Eco International 2025
- Major competitions: Miss Universe Philippines 2024; (Top 10); (Best National Costume); Miss Eco International 2025; (Winner); (Best National Costume); Reina Filipinas 2026; (Winner – Reina Filipinas MGI All Stars); MGI All Stars 2nd Edition; (TBD)

Alexie Mae Caimoso Brooks (born February 21, 2001) is a Filipino athlete, model, and beauty pageant titleholder. She was appointed as Miss Eco Philippines 2025 and won Reina Filipinas MGI All Stars 2026. She represented the Philippines at Miss Eco International 2025, held on April 19, 2025 in Egypt where she became the third Filipina to be crowned as Miss Eco International. She will represent the Philippines at MGI All Stars 2nd edition later that year.

== Early life and education ==
Brooks was born on February 21, 2001, in Lebanon to a Black American father and an overseas Filipino worker mother. She was raised in Leon, Iloilo, by her grandparents. She pursued a Bachelor of Science in Business Administration (BSBA), majoring in Marketing Management, at the National University in Manila, where she graduated in 2024.

In 2022, Brooks was named the Most Valuable Player by the University Athletic Association of the Philippines while representing the National University in athletics during UAAP Season 85. That same year, she was part of the Philippine delegation and competed in the 31st Southeast Asian Games held in Vietnam. Brooks ranked fifth in the heptathlon event.

== Pageantry ==
=== Miss Universe Philippines 2024 ===
Brooks represented Iloilo City at Miss Universe Philippines 2024 after winning the title of Miss Iloilo earlier that year. She finished in the Top 10 of the national pageant and was later appointed as Miss Eco Philippines 2025.

=== Miss Eco International 2025 ===
Brooks represented the Philippines at Miss Eco International 2025. At the end of the event, Brooks won the Best in National Costume award, and was ultimately crowned as Miss Eco International 2025, the third woman to win the title for the Philippines, after Cynthia Thomalla and Kathleen Paton.

=== Reina Filipinas 2026 ===
Brooks joined the inaugural Reina Filipinas competition and was named one of the front-runners for the pageant. She was crowned Reina Filipinas MGI All Stars 2026 alongside Anne Patricia Diaz. Both will represent the Philippines at the 2nd edition of MGI All Stars

=== MGI All Stars (2nd Edition) ===
Brooks and Diaz will represent the country at MGI All Stars 2nd Edition later that year.

== Personal life ==
Brooks identifies as androgynous.

Awards and achievements
Preceded by (Ukraine) Angelina Usanova	Miss Eco International; 2025	Succeeded by (Mexico) Palmira Ruiz
Preceded by Chantal Schmidt (Cebu City)	Miss Eco Philippines; 2025	Succeeded by Gabbi Carballo (Cebu City)
