= Jasmin Bungay =

Filipino model and beauty pageant titleholder

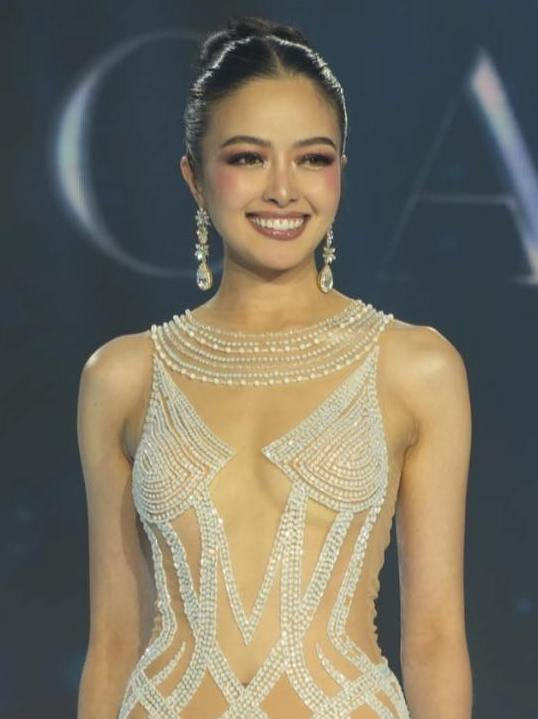
- Bungay in 2024
- Born: Jasmin Castro Bungay; May 3, 1997 (age 29); Porac, Pampanga, Philippines
- Education: Angeles University Foundation
- Occupations: Teacher; model
- Beauty pageant titleholder
- Title: Binibining Pilipinas Globe 2024
- Major competitions: Binibining Pilipinas 2024; (Winner – Binibining Pilipinas Globe 2024); The Miss Globe 2024; (2nd Runner-Up)

Jasmin Castro Bungay (born 1997) is a Filipino model and beauty pageant titleholder who was crowned Binibining Pilipinas Globe 2024. An advocate for Overseas Filipino Workers and a vocal supporter of the SOGIE Equality Bill. She represented the Philippines at The Miss Globe 2024 competition and was second runner-up.

== Early life and education ==
Bungay was raised in Porac, Pampanga. She graduated magna cum laude from the Angeles University Foundation with a degree in Secondary Education majoring in Mathematics. She is a licensed professional teacher. Bungay worked as an overseas Filipino worker (OFW) in Dubai's logistics and freight forwarding industry. She also worked as a model for Harvey Cenit and walked for designers Michael Cinco and Ezra Santos.

== Pageantry ==
=== Early pageants ===
In December 2016, Bungay won Mutya Ning Kapampangan 2016 at the Bren Z. Guiao Convention Center in San Fernando, Pampanga. Bungay was also a top ten finalist at Miss Millennial Philippines 2017, a tourism beauty pageant segment on the then-GMA Network variety show Eat Bulaga!. In 2021, she also entered Miss Philippines Earth Dubai, and competed as a representative of the Filipino community in Dubai at Miss Philippines Earth .

=== Binibining Pilipinas 2024 ===
On April 5, 2024, Bungay was announced as one of the 40 delegates to compete at Binibining Pilipinas 2024, representing Pampanga. The pageant was held on July 7, at the Araneta Coliseum in Quezon City, Philippines. Bungay progressed to the question-and-answer portion, where Miss Universe 1969 Gloria Diaz asked her, "If you were given 30 minutes to talk to the public, what would you talk about?". Bungay said:

If I would be given 30 minutes to talk to the public, I would like to talk about the passing of the SOGIE SC bill. Because, in celebrations such as pageants, this community has contributed so much. And in this regard, we can give back to them by supporting this cause because as an individual, it is our responsibility that we ensure that everyone is treated equally despite their SOGIE.

Bungay went on to win the pageant, and crowned by her predecessor Anna Lakrini. As a winner, Bungay and co-winner Binibining Pilipinas International 2024 Myrna Esguerra received a cash prize of ₱1,000,000, the largest cash prize in the pageant's history.

=== The Miss Globe 2024 ===
Bungay represented the Philippines at The Miss Globe 2024 held in Albania on October 15, 2024, and was second runner-up.

== Advocacies ==
Bungay is an advocate for the welfare of OFWs and has dedicated her victory in the Binibining Pilipinas pageant to the OFW community in Dubai. She is a supporter of the SOGIE Equality Bill.

Awards and achievements
Preceded by (Philippines) Anna Lakrini	The Miss Globe; 2nd Runner-Up; 2024	Succeeded by (United States) Samantha Sarelli
Preceded by Anna Lakrini (Bataan)	Binibining Pilipinas Globe; 2024	Succeeded by Annabelle McDonnell (Iligan)
