= Myrna Esguerra =

Filipino beauty pageant titleholder

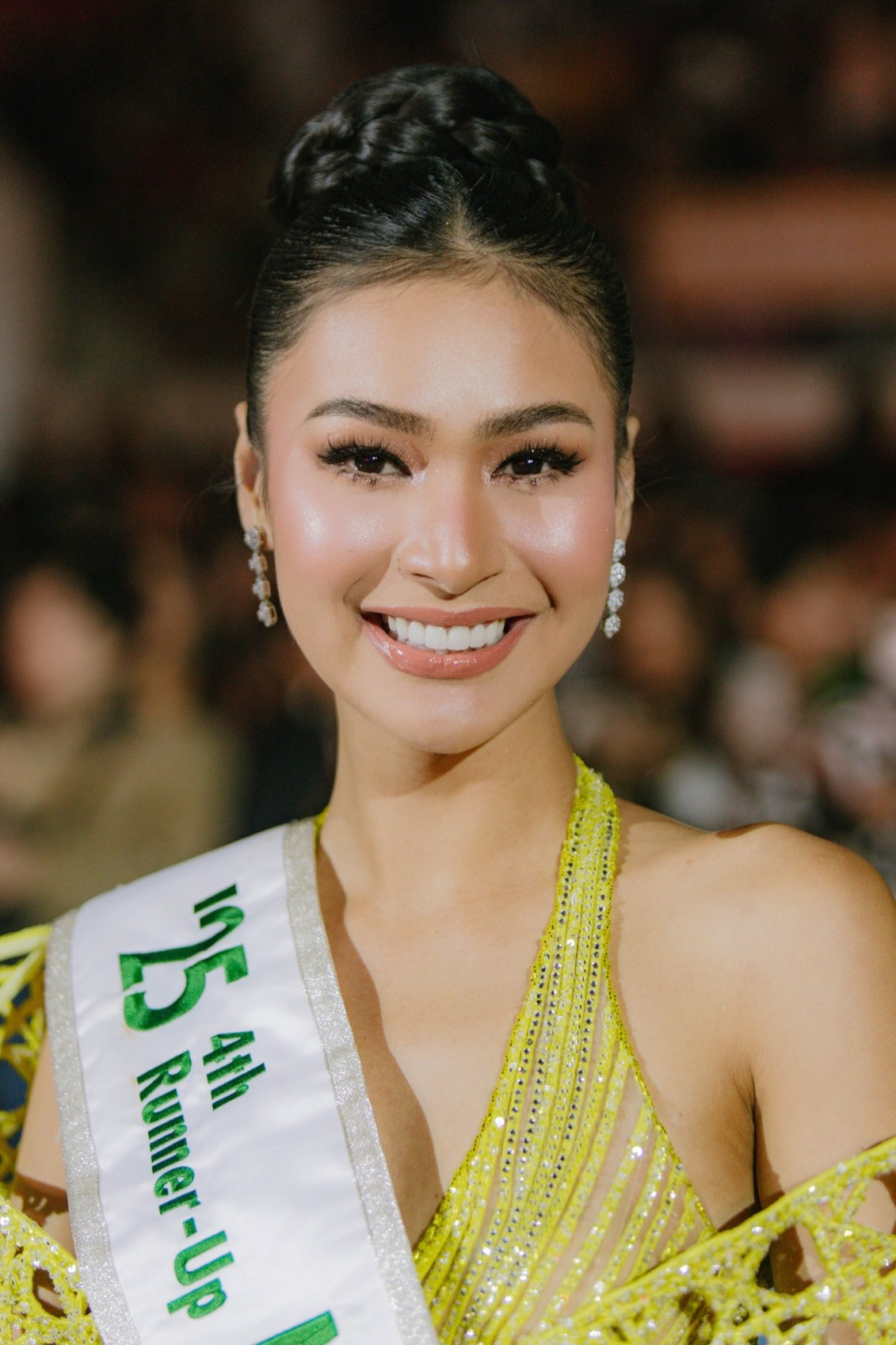
- Esguerra in 2025
- Born: Myrna Toribio Esguerra; October 2, 2001 (age 25); Pidigan, Abra, Philippines
- Education: City College of Angeles (BS)
- Occupations: Model; event coordinator; event host
- Height: 1.73 m (5 ft 8 in)
- Beauty pageant titleholder
- Title: Binibining Pilipinas International 2024
- Major competitions: Binibining Pilipinas 2024; (Winner – Binibining Pilipinas International 2024); Miss International 2025; (4th Runner-Up)

Myrna Toribio Esguerra (Note: Tagalog pronunciation: [ˌmiɾ.n̪ɐ t̪oˌɾib.jo ʔɛsˈɡɛː.ɾɐ]) (born October 2, 2001) is a Filipino model and beauty pageant titleholder who won the title Binibining Pilipinas International 2024. She was the first entrant to represent Abra at the Binibining Pilipinas competition. Esguerra represented the Philippines at Miss International 2025 pageant, where she placed as the fourth runner-up.

Esguerra previously competed in Miss Teen Philippines and won Miss Abra 2023. She is an advocate for environmental preservation and has centered her advocacy on sustainable development.

== Early life and education ==
Esguerra was born on October 2, 2001, in Pidigan, Abra, to a Kapampangan father and Ilocano mother. She has sixteen siblings. In her teenage years, Esguerra moved to Angeles City, to pursue a bachelor's degree in tourism management with a specialization in meetings, incentives, conferences, and exhibitions (MICE), at the City College of Angeles, where she began her career in pageantry by participating in its annual beauty pageant, winning its 2022 edition. She financed her studies independently from the age of 17 and graduated in 2024.

== Modeling career ==
Esguerra began her modeling career at the age of 20, appearing in advertisements for Philippine Airlines, Clark Marriott Hotel, and Omni Aviation. Esguerra also works as a part-time event coordinator and host. Esguerra presented the Mutya Ning San Antonio pageant in 2023 and the preliminary competition of the Miss Abra 2024 pageant.

== Pageantry ==
=== Early pageants ===
In 2019, Esguerra competed in the Miss Teen Philippines 2019 pageant and did not reach the top five. In 2023, she competed in and won Miss Abra 2023, representing Pidigan. The following year, she crowned Jeralene Acosta as her successor.

=== Binibining Pilipinas 2024 ===
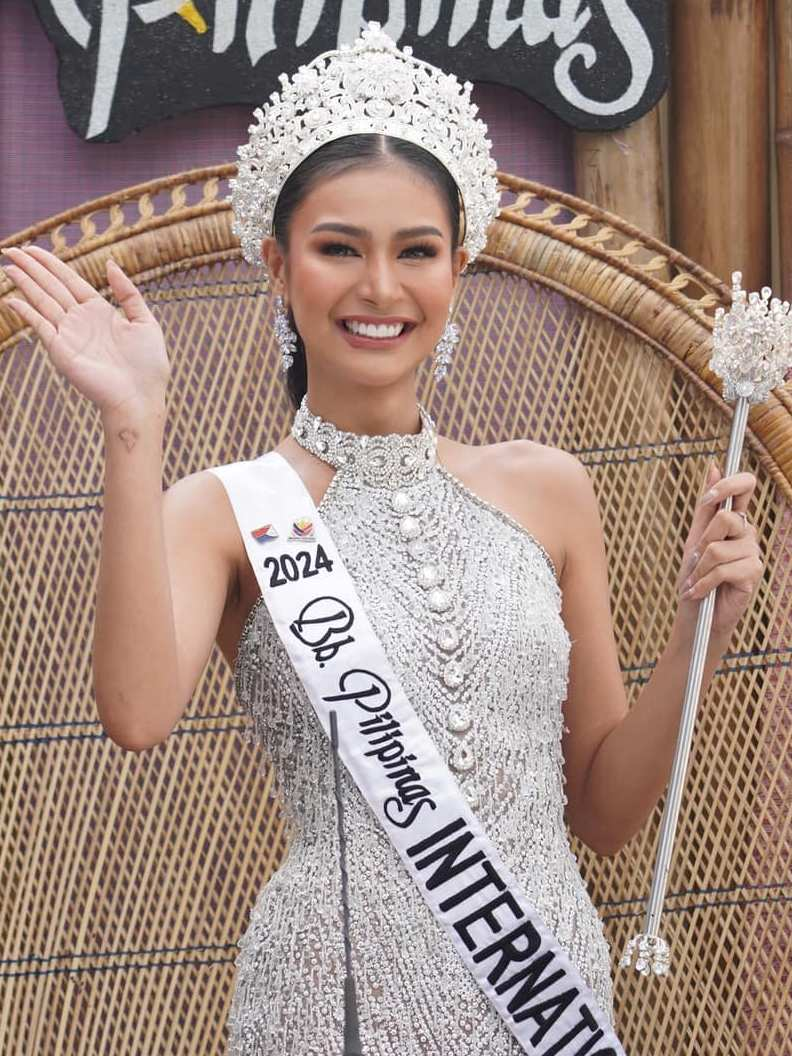
Esguerra as Binibining Pilipinas International

On April 5, 2024, Esguerra was announced as one of the 40 delegates to Binibining Pilipinas 2024. Having previously won Miss Abra 2023, Esguerra entered the pageant as the first delegate to represent Abra in the pageant's history. In the preliminary contests, Esguerra was one of the winners of the national costume competition with her Dulimaman ensemble dedicated to her mother's profession as a weaver.

Esguerra also won the Best in Swimsuit and Best in Evening Gown awards, as well as two awards from the pageant's sponsors. Esguerra would progress to the top 15 question and answer round where Miss Universe 1973 Margie Moran asked her "If a time machine brings you back to 1964, 60 years ago when Binibining Pilipinas began… what message would you tell the Filipino women of that time about the women of 2024?". In her answer, Esguerra stated that she will tell the women of 1964 that the next generation had succeeded in empowering women, emphasizing her financial independence from the age of 17 and the support given to her by the women around her.

At the end of the pageant, Esguerra was crowned Binibining Pilipinas International 2024 by her predecessor Angelica Lopez and Miss International 2023 Andrea Rubio. As a winner of the pageant's 60th edition, Esguerra, along with co-winner Binibining Pilipinas Globe 2024 Jasmin Bungay, received a cash prize of ₱1,000,000, the largest cash prize in the pageant's history. She would donate part of the prize to World Vision Philippines.

The Abra provincial government honored Esguerra with a homecoming parade, and she led the community dance during the 37th Cordillera Day festivities on July 15, 2024. The festival was also celebrated as "Myrna Day" in commemoration of her victory.

=== Miss International 2025 ===
As Binibining Pilipinas International 2024, Esguerra represented the Philippines at the Miss International 2025 pageant in Japan in November for two weeks.

During the coronation night, Esguerra became a top 20 semifinalist and advanced to the top 10, where she was asked about her chosen Sustainable Development Goals (SDGs). She selected SDG 4 (Quality Education) and SDG 17 (Partnership for the Goals), highlighting her initiative, Project Dream Readers. Esguerra expressed that being the only one among her 16 siblings to complete college is her proudest achievement. To give back to her community, she founded Dream Readers in the Philippines, a project aimed at supporting quality education and fostering partnerships, with the hope of helping children thrive and avoid the hardships she experienced. Esguerra then advanced to the top 5, where the contestants were asked to describe their entire Miss International experience to their family and loved ones. Esguerra stated that she would tell her mother she gained 79 new “siblings” through Miss International. She shared that her experience in the pageant taught her selflessness, the value of global friendships, and the importance of helping others. She felt it made her a more caring person and inspired her to continue her project as a tribute to everyone who supported her.

Esguerra finished as the fourth runner-up, with Catalina Duque of Colombia winning the competition.

== Advocacies ==
An advocate for environmental preservation, Esguerra has worked with the National Cleanup Coalition Philippines and has centered her platform for Binibining Pilipinas on sustainability.

== Notes ==
Awards and achievements
Preceded by Sophie Kirana (Indonesia)	Miss International 4th Runner-Up; 2025	Incumbent
Preceded by Angelica Lopez (Palawan)	Binibining Pilipinas International; 2024	Succeeded by Katrina Johnson (Davao)
