= Binibining Pilipinas 2015 =

52nd Binibining Pilipinas pageant

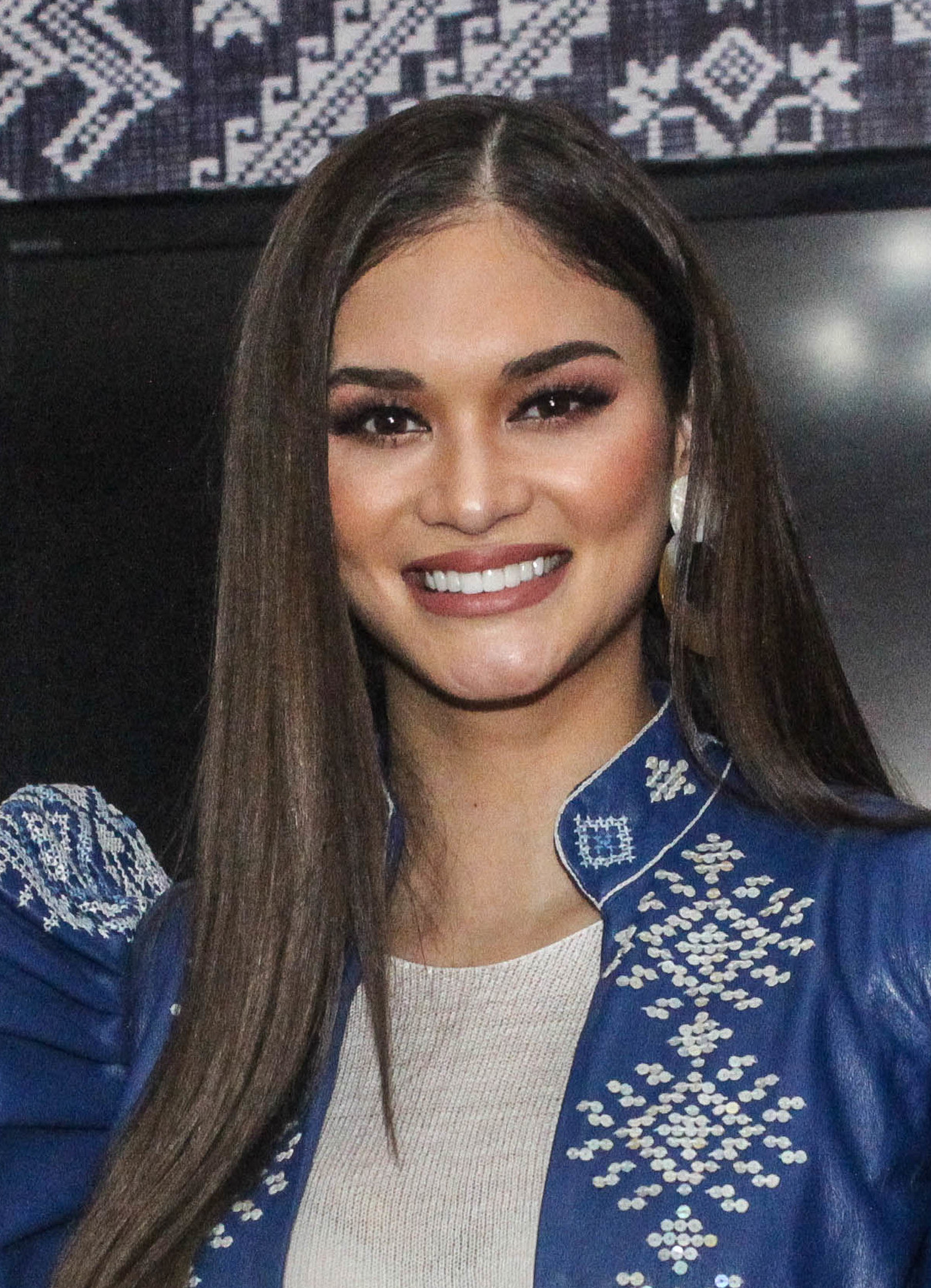
- Pia Wurtzbach
- Date: March 15, 2015
- Presenters: Xian Lim; Toni Gonzaga; Venus Raj; Shamcey Supsup; Ariella Arida
- Entertainment: Jay R; Jason Dy
- Venue: Smart Araneta Coliseum, Quezon City, Metro Manila, Philippines
- Broadcaster: ABS-CBN
- Entrants: 34
- Placements: 15
- Winner: Pia Wurtzbach; Cagayan de Oro
- Congeniality: Toni Alyessa Hipolito Davao City
- Best National Costume: Teresita Marquez Parañaque
- Photogenic: Caneille Faith Santos Marilao, Bulacan

Binibining Pilipinas 2015 was the 52nd edition of the Binibining Pilipinas pageant, held at the Smart Araneta Coliseum in Quezon City, Metro Manila, Philippines, on March 15, 2015.

At the end of the event, Mary Jean Lastimosa crowned Pia Wurtzbach as Miss Universe Philippines 2015, Bianca Guidotti crowned Janicel Lubina as Binibining Pilipinas International 2015, Kris Tiffany Janson crowned Christi McGarry as Binibining Pilipinas Intercontinental 2015, Yvethe Marie Santiago crowned Rogelie Catacutan as Binibining Pilipinas Supranational 2015, and Parul Shah crowned Ann Colis as Binibining Pilipinas Tourism 2015. Hannah Ruth Sison was named first runner-up while Kimverlyn Suiza was named second runner-Up.

== Results ==
Color keys

- The contestant won an international pageant.
- The contestant was a runner-up in an international pageant.
- The contestant was a semi-finalist in an international pageant.

| Placement | Contestant | International Placement |
|---|---|---|
| Miss Universe Philippines 2015 | Bb. #10 – Pia Wurtzbach | Winner – Miss Universe 2015 |
| Binibining Pilipinas International 2015 | Bb. #11 – Janicel Lubina | Top 10 – Miss International 2015 |
| Binibining Pilipinas Supranational 2015 | Bb. #25 – Rogelie Catacutan | Top 20 – Miss Supranational 2015 |
| Binibining Pilipinas Intercontinental 2015 | Bb. #19 – Christi McGarry | 1st Runner-Up – Miss Intercontinental 2015 |
| Binibining Pilipinas Tourism 2015 | Bb. #24 – Ann Colis (Appointed as Binibining Pilipinas Globe 2015) | Winner – The Miss Globe 2015 |
| 1st Runner-Up | Bb. #28 – Hannah Ruth Sison | |
| 2nd Runner-Up | Bb. #8 – Kimverlyn Suiza | |
| Top 15 | Bb. #9 - Maolin Yalung; Bb. #12 - Kylie Verzosa; Bb. #14 - Princess Joy Camu; Bb. #17 - Brenna Cassandra Gamboa; Bb. #21 - Alaiza Flor Malinao; Bb. #22 - Anja Vanessa Peter; Bb. #23 - Justine Beatrice Felizarta; Bb. #34 - Teresita Marquez | |

=== Special awards ===
| Results | Contestant | Ref. |
|---|---|---|
| Binibining Friendship | Bb. #6 – Toni Alyessa Hipolito | |
| Binibining Talent | Bb. #34 – Winwyn Marquez | |
| Miss Photogenic | Bb. #5 – Cannielle Faith Santos | |
| Best in National Costume | Bb. #34 – Winwyn Marquez | |
| Best in Swimsuit | Bb. #11 – Janicel Lubina | |
| Best in Long Gown | Bb. #11 – Janicel Lubina | |
| Binibining Philippine Airlines | Bb. #12 – Kylie Verzosa | |
| Manila Bulletin Choice Award | Bb. #5 – Cannielle Faith Santos | |
| She's So JAG 2015 | Bb. #34 – Winwyn Marquez | |
| Miss Cream Silk | Bb. #34 – Pia Wurtzbach | |

== Judges ==
- Leila De Lima – Secretary of the Department of Justice
- Kiefer Ravena – Basketball player from the Ateneo Blue Eagles
- Vice Ganda – TV presenter, actor, and entertainer
- Bernd Schneider – General Manager of the Sofitel Philippine Plaza Manila
- Sarah Meier – TV host, model
- Frederick Go – President and COO of Robinsons Land Corporation
- Gen. Gregorio Pio Catapang – Chief of Staff of the Armed Forces of the Philippines
- H.E. Luis Lillo – Ambassador of Chile to the Philippines
- H.E. Gilles Garachon – Ambassador of France to the Philippines
- Cong. Leni Robredo – Member of the House of Representatives from Camarines Sur's 3rd district

== Contestants ==
34 contestants competed for the six titles.

| No. | Contestant | Age (Note: Ages at the time of the pageant) | Hometown |
|---|---|---|---|
| 1 | Samantha Barbara Balbin | 26 | Quezon City |
| 2 | Maria Jenny Feliz Gonzalez | 25 | Rizal |
| 3 | Ria Rabajante | 25 | Pasig |
| 4 | Renee Sorraya Hassani | 23 | Loay, Bohol |
| 5 | Cannielle Faith Santos | 26 | Bulacan |
| 6 | Toni Alyessa Hipolito | 25 | Davao City |
| 7 | Enrica Roxielle Guieb | 23 | Angeles City |
| 8 | Kimverlyn Suiza | 26 | Marikina |
| 9 | Maolin Yalung | 20 | Mabalacat, Pampanga |
| 10 | Pia Wurtzbach | 25 | Cagayan de Oro |
| 11 | Janicel Lubina | 19 | Palawan |
| 12 | Kylie Verzosa | 23 | Baguio |
| 13 | Mae Liezel Ramos | 24 | Camarines Sur |
| 14 | Princess Joy Camu | 20 | Albay |
| 15 | Paula Rich Bartolome | 24 | Laguna |
| 16 | Marvi Ann de Lima | 24 | Iriga, Camarines Sur |
| 17 | Brenna Cassandra Gamboa | 25 | Parañaque |
| 18 | Crissa Marie Mendiola | 19 | Floridablanca, Pampanga |
| 19 | Christi McGarry | 25 | Nabua, Camarines Sur |
| 20 | Tanya Angelina Nicole Hyde | 24 | Masbate |
| 21 | Alaiza Flor Malinao | 21 | Sulop, Davao del Sur |
| 22 | Anja Vanessa Peter | 26 | Antipolo |
| 23 | Justine Beatrice Felizarta | 21 | Padada, Davao del Sur |
| 24 | Ann Colis | 22 | Mexico, Pampanga |
| 25 | Rogelie Catacutan | 23 | Cebu City |
| 26 | Anabel Christine Tia | 26 | Ozamiz |
| 27 | Ina Dominica Guerrero | 21 | Capalonga, Camarines Norte |
| 28 | Hannah Ruth Sison | 26 | Oas, Albay |
| 29 | Nancy Lee Leonard | 24 | Zamboanga City |
| 30 | Patricia Lae Ejercitado | 26 | Cainta, Rizal |
| 31 | Mia Allyson Howell | 24 | Catanduanes |
| 32 | Danita Joan Ruazol | 24 | Cavinti, Laguna |
| 33 | Namrata Neesha Murjani | 22 | Cebu |
| 34 | Teresita Ssen Marquez | 22 | Muntinlupa |

== Notes ==
=== Post-pageant notes ===
- Pia Wurtzbach competed and won at Miss Universe 2015 in Las Vegas, Nevada. Wurtzbach ended the Philippines' 42-year title drought.
- Janicel Lubina competed at Miss International 2015 in Tokyo, Japan where she finished as one of the top 10 finalists. Lubina also won the Miss Best Dresser award. On the other hand, Rogelie Catacutan competed at Miss Supranational 2015 in Krynica-Zdrój, Poland where she finished as a top 20 semifinalists.
- After being appointed as Binibining Pilipinas Grand International 2015, Parul Shah competed at Miss Grand International 2015 in Bangkok, Thailand and was named Third Runner-Up. After being appointed as Binibining Pilipinas Globe 2015, Ann Colis was crowned as the winner of Miss Globe 2015 held in Toronto, Canada.
- Christi McGarry competed again at Miss Intercontinental in Magdeburg, Germany and was named First Runner-Up. McGarry was also awarded as the Continental Queen of Asia and Oceania.
- Kylie Verzosa competed again at Binibining Pilipinas 2016 and was crowned Binibining Pilipinas International 2016. She competed at Miss International 2016 in Tokyo, Japan and won.
- Winwyn Marquez later competed at Miss World Philippines 2017 where she was crowned as Reina Hispanoamericana Filipinas 2017. She competed at Reina Hispanoamericana 2017 in Santa Cruz de la Sierra, Bolivia and won. Marquez was the first Asian to be crowned Reina Hispanoamericana.
