= Binibining Pilipinas 1964 =

Beauty pageant

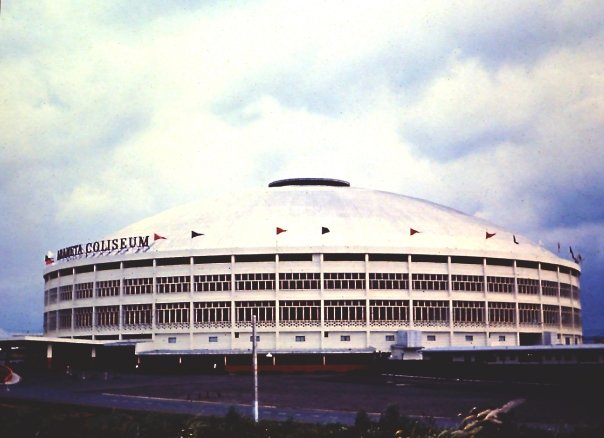
- Araneta Coliseum, the venue of the pageant
- Date: July 5, 1964
- Venue: Araneta Coliseum, Quezon City, Metro Manila, Philippines
- Entrants: 15
- Winner: Myrna Panlilio

Binibining Pilipinas 1964 was the first edition of Binibining Pilipinas, under the leadership of Stella Marquez-Araneta. It took place at the Araneta Coliseum in Quezon City, Philippines on July 5, 1964. It was supposedly scheduled on July 3, 1964, but it was moved to two days after due to Typhoon Danding that affected Manila and Central Luzon.

At the end of event, Lalaine Bennett, Miss Philippines 1963, crowned Myrna Panlilio as the first Binibining Pilipinas. Milagros Cataag was named Binibining Waling-waling (First Runner-Up), while Elvira Gonzales was named Binibining Ilang-Ilang (Second Runner-Up).

== Results ==
Color keys

- The contestant did not place.

Placement	Contestant	International placement
Binibining Pilipinas 1964	Maria Myrna Sese Panlilio	Unplaced – Miss Universe 1964
Binibining Waling-Waling (1st Runner-Up)	Milagros Cataag	
Binibining Ilang-Ilang (2nd Runner-Up)	Elvira Gonzales	

== Candidates ==
15 delegates have been selected to compete in this year.

Candidate	Placement
Marilou Alberto	
Lilia Alvarez	
Milagros Cataag	Binibining Waling-Waling
Edna Rossana Keyes	
Marita Dimayuga	
Aida Gaerlan	
Elvira Gonzales	Binibining Ilang-Ilang
Elizabeth Gutierrez	
Carmelita Larrabaster	
Maria Sonia Orendain	
Maria Myrna Sese Panlilio	Binibining Pilipinas 1964
Thelma Shaw	
Carmencita "Chiqui" Somes	
Milagros Sumayao	
Nina Zaldua	
