= Janicel Lubina =

Filipino model

- Born: Janicel Jaranilla Lubina; April 1, 1995 (age 31); Narra, Palawan, Philippines
- Education: STI College
- Height: 5 ft 9 in (1.75 m)
- Spouse: James Valera (m. 2018)
- Beauty pageant titleholder
- Title: Binibining Pilipinas International 2015
- Agency: Binibining Pilipinas Charities, Inc.
- Hair color: Black
- Eye color: Dark Brown
- Major competitions: Miss World Philippines 2013; (1st Princess); Binibining Pilipinas 2015; (Winner – Binibining Pilipinas International 2015); Miss International 2015; (Top 10); (Miss Best Dresser)

Janicel Jaranilla Lubina-Valera (born April 1, 1995) is a Filipino beauty pageant titleholder and actress who was crowned Binibining Pilipinas International 2015. Prior to that she was crowned as the 1st Princess (1st Runner-up) at the Miss World Philippines 2013 pageant.

== Biography ==
Janicel Lubina studied Bachelor of Science in Tourism Management at STI College as a scholar for before winning Miss Bikini Philippines 2013. From her beginnings as a housemaid along with her mother, Lubina was spotted and convinced by a make-up artist, who later became her handler to join beauty pageants.

== Pageantry ==
=== Mutya ng Palawan ===
Lubina joined this pageant where she won the title Mutya ng Palawan 2012.

=== Slimmers World Miss Bikini Philippines ===
Lubina joined this pageant where she won the title Slimmers' World Miss Bikini Philippines 2013. This was her first exposure to national beauty contests.

=== Miss Scuba International 2012 ===
Lubina competed at this pageant that was held in Jakarta, Indonesia where she made it to the Top 5 but failed to earn a spot in the Top 3.

=== Miss World Philippines 2013 ===
Lubina joined for the first time a Major National Pageant in Miss World Philippines 2013. She placed 1st Princess behind the winner Megan Young, who would be later crowned as Miss World 2013.

=== Binibining Pilipinas 2015 ===
Lubina joined again at a major national pageant, this time at the Binibining Pilipinas 2015 which was held in Araneta Coliseum on March 15, 2015. She was Candidate #11 in the competition. She was one of the winners and was crowned as Binibining Pilipinas International 2015.

=== Miss International 2015 ===
Lubina represented Philippines at the Miss International 2015 held in Japan on November 5, 2015. She placed as one of the Top 10 Finalists. She also won the Best Dresser Special Award.

== Personal life ==
In 2018, Lubina married her fiancé James Valera.

Awards and achievements
Preceded by Bianca Guidotti (Taguig)	Binibining Pilipinas International; 2015	Succeeded by Kylie Verzosa (Baguio)
