= MGI All Stars 2nd Edition =

Second edition of the MGI All Stars competition

- Date: 12 December 2026

MGI All Stars 2nd Edition will be the 2nd edition of the MGI All Stars pageant, to be held on 12 December 2026, organized by the Miss Grand International Organization. The pageant will feature former contestants from international beauty pageants, with applications officially opening in June 2026.

Vanessa Pulgarin of Colombia, winner of the inaugural edition, is expected to return to defend her title. The competition is also expected to feature changes to part of the judging panel from the previous season.

== Background ==
=== Announcement and development ===
Following the conclusion of MGI All Stars 1st Edition, the Miss Grand International Organization announced a second season of the competition in response to strong audience demand and positive reception toward the inaugural edition. The first season attracted attention for its open eligibility format, which allowed former contestants from international beauty pageants, including married women, mothers, and transgender women, to participate.

Applications for the second season officially opened on 6 June 2026, less than a week after the conclusion of the inaugural edition. The winner of the first season, Vanessa Pulgarin of Colombia, is expected to return in an attempt to defend her title, in accordance with the competition's format permitting reigning titleholders to compete in subsequent editions. Media reports also indicated that approximately half of the judging panel from the inaugural season may be replaced, although the organization has yet to officially announce the complete panel.

=== Date and venue ===
The final competition of MGI All Stars 2nd Edition is preliminarily scheduled to be held on 12 December 2026. As of June 2026, the Miss Grand International Organization has not officially announced further details regarding the venue, host city, or competition schedule.

=== Selection of contestants ===
Applications for MGI All Stars 2nd Edition officially opened on 6 June 2026. The competition is open to women and transgender women aged between 20 and 40 who have previously participated in any international beauty pageant. Eligibility is not restricted by marital status or motherhood, and participating countries may field multiple contestants.

In the Philippines, the newly established Reina Filipinas pageant was unveiled as the official selection platform for the second edition of MGI All Stars. According to the organizers, the competition would select two delegates who had previously competed in international pageants to represent the Philippines at the event, in addition to one representative for Miss Grand International 2026. Meanwhile, at the Miss Grand Dominican Republic 2026, Miss Grand Vietnam 2026, and other 2026 Miss Grand national pageants, a runner-up with prior international pageant experience was likewise designated as that country's representative to this edition of MGI All Stars.

== Prize structure ==
The prize structure for this edition is expected to remain unchanged from the inaugural edition. The winner is set to receive a cash prize of US$100,000, to be distributed in installments under the competition's existing payment structure. The first and second runners-up will also receive cash prizes, although the organization has not publicly disclosed the amounts.

Under the MGI All Stars prize system introduced during the inaugural season, reigning winners are eligible to compete in subsequent editions. A contestant who wins the title for three consecutive editions is eligible to receive an additional bonus prize of US$1 million.

== Pageant ==
=== Selection committee ===
The selection committee for this edition is expected to undergo significant changes, with approximately half of the judging panel from the inaugural season reportedly being replaced.

- Gloria Diaz — Miss Universe 1969 from the Philippines
- Megan Young — Miss World 2013 from the Philippines
- Shyare Andrade — Miss Grand International 2026 first runner-up from Ecuador
- Lu Sierra — American model, runway and pageant coach, television host, and actress
- Omar Harfouch — French–Lebanese composer and businessman
- Osmel Sousa — Cuban–Venezuelan beauty pageant entrepreneur and former president of the Miss Venezuela Organization
- Psi Scott — Thai–Scottish marine conservationist

== Contestants ==
As of October 2026, the following contestants have been confirmed for the competition. One of them is Vanessa Pulgarin of Colombia, the winner of the inaugural edition, who is set to return to defend her title. Under the competition's rules, the reigning winner automatically qualifies for the final competition through the previous winner's wildcard system.

- Qualified for the top 18

Contestant	Country/ Territory	Age (Note: Ages at the time of the pageant)	Hometown	Previous International Competition (Note: The international competition through which the contestant met the eligibility requirement for MGI All Stars.)	Preliminary Score			Ref.
Contestant	Country/ Territory	Age	Hometown	Previous International Competition	Judges	Vote	Total	Ref.
Aicha Verheye	BEL	23	Ostend	Contestant — Supermodel International 2019 (Representing Benelux); Contestant — Miss Tourism Planet 2023; Winner — Miss Lumière International World 2023				
Ala Lim	TWN	34	Taipei	Contestant — Miss International Queen 2024; Contestant — Miss Galaxy of Beauty 2024				
Alexie Brooks	PHL	25	Iloilo City	Winner — Miss Eco International 2025				
Anastasiya Ammosova	RUS	28	Balashov	Winner – Miss Europe 2018				
Anne Patricia Diaz	PHL	28	Manila	Contestant — Miss International Queen 2013 (Representing Singapore); 1st Runner-Up — Miss Equality World 2023; Top 6 — Miss International Queen 2025				
Ashley Flete	DOM	25	Miami	13th — Miss Universe Latina, el reality (Representing Venezuela)				
Assuntina Chusak	THA	24	Kamphaeng Phet	Top 10 — Miss Aura International 2026				
Aya Kadjo	CIV	30	Yamoussoukro	Top 10 – Miss Earth 2019; Contestant – Miss Grand International 2024				
Azaliya Timergalieva	(Tatarstan) TAR	22	Kazan	2nd Runner-Up — Miss Aura International 2026				
Bùi Lý Thiên Hương	VNM	30	An Giang	Winner — Miss Vietnam Worldwide 2018				
Carrie Xie	CHN	36		Winner — Miss United Nation International 2017; Contestant — MGI All Stars 1st Edition				
Celia Bosco	TLS	21	Lospalos	Contestant — Miss Global 2026				
Chawanluck Unger	THA	32	Bangkok	4th Runner-Up — Miss Asia Pacific World 2012				
Cristini Cuoto	ESP	40	Pamplona	Winner — Miss T International 2007; Contestant — Miss International Queen 2014; Contestant — Miss Europa Continental 2023				
Daniella André	PRT	26	Loulé	Contestant — Miss Planet International 2024				
Génesis Dávila	PRI	35	Arroyo	Contestant — Miss World 2014; 1st Runner-Up — Miss Universe Latina, el reality; 1st Runner-Up — Miss Intercontinental 2012				
Genie Cheng	TWN		Taipei	Contestant — Miss Glam Universe Asia 2025; Contestant — Miss Culture International 2026				
Georgia Garises	NAM	20	Windhoek	Top 10 — Miss Charm 2024				
Hà Tâm Như	VNM	27	Vĩnh Long	2nd Runner-Up — Miss International Queen 2025				
Hannah Bowen	GBR	30	Neath	Contestant — Royal International Miss 2022/2023				
Ignacia Michelson	CHL	33	Santiago	Top 25 — Miss Grand International 2026				
Irene Grande	ESP	26	Madrid	1st Runner-Up — Reinado Internacional del Cacao 2023; 2nd Runner-Up — Miss Elite World 2024				
Ivana García	VEN	23	Orlando	Top 22 — Miss Grand International 2025 (Representing United States)				
Jazmín de la Sierra	PRY	27	Asunción	Contestant — Miss International 2023				
Jesseca Long	SGP	27	Singapore	Top 10 — Miss Planet International 2024; Contestant — Miss Global Asian 2024				
Kitava-Yvettlana Amankwaa	GHA	31	Accra	Contestant — Miss Grand International 2023				
Lisandra Chirinos	VEN	30	Valencia	Winner — Miss Latinoamérica 2017; Contestant — Reinado Internacional del Café 2023; 1st Runner-Up — Universal Woman 2024				
Lisandra Delgado	CUB	36	Havana	Contestant — Miss Grand International 2017				
Lola de los Santos	URY	30	Paysandú	Contestant — Miss Universe 2020; Contestant — Miss Supranational 2024				
Maeya Sunsun	THA	28	Nakhon Si Thammarat	1st Runner-Up — Miss Fabulous International 2023				
Mara Topić	ECU	30	Guayaquil	Top 10 — Miss Grand International 2019; Top 30 — Miss Universe 2024				
Mariia Zheliaskova	UKR	24	Odesa	Top 8 — Miss Earth 2025; 2nd Runner-Up — The Miss Globe 2026				
Mariana Macías	MEX	30	Chapala	Contestant — Miss Grand International 2021; Winner — Top Model of the World 2023				
Matilda Wirtavuori	FIN	26	Tampere	Top 21 — Miss Eco International 2022; Top 30 — Miss Universe 2024				
Melanie Shiraz	ISR	27	Caesarea	Contestant — Miss Universe 2025				
Melloney Dassanayaka	LKA	27	Colombo	Contestant — Miss Universe 2024				
Michelle Dee	PHL	31	Makati	Top 12 — Miss World 2019; Top 10 — Miss Universe 2023				
Michelo Malambo	ZMB	35	Lusaka	Contestant — Miss World 2015				
Milanda Aengmany	LAO	29		Contestant — Miss International Queen 2022; Contestant — MGI All Stars 1st Edition				
Naima Acosta	MEX	20	Ticino	Contestant — Miss Universe 2025 (Representing Switzerland)				
Natalia Guglielmo	ITA	24	Palermo	Winner — Miss Europe 2023; Top 25 — Miss Earth 2025				
Natthakan Kunchayawanat	THA	28	Kanchanaburi	Top 11 — Miss Eco International 2025				
Parita Pran	THA		Chai Nat	Contestant — Miss Star International 2023; Winner — Queen Trans World 2023				
Paulina Uceda	MEX	26	Uruapan	1st Runner-Up – Miss Intercontinental 2021				
Phaimany Lathsabanthao	LAO	31	Vientiane	Contestant — Miss Universe 2023				
Polina Ammosova	RUS	24	Saratov	Top 20 – Miss Europe Continental 2019; Contestant — Miss Grand International 2026				
Prema Lamgade	NPL	24	Siddharthanagar	Contestant — Miss Grand International 2024				
Ratih Syafriza	IDN	34	Surakarta	Top 16 — World Beauty Queen 2017; Contestant — Miss Glam World 2019				
Rebecca Shandley	AUS	28	Sydney	Contestant — Miss Supranational 2026				
Ritassya Wellgreat	IDN	25	Palembang	5th Runner-Up — Miss Grand International 2023				
Romane Alvies	LKA	27	Negombo	Contestant – Miss Earth 2020; Contestant – Miss Environment International 2023; Contestant – Miss Celebrity International 2024				
Sabrina Maged	EGY	24	Cairo	Contestant — Miss Universe 2025				
Sarunrat Puagpipat	THA	30	Phuket	1st Runner-Up — Miss Grand International 2025				
Sheila Singelengele	ZMB	22	Lusaka	Contestant — Miss Charm 2024				
Shelbi Byrnes	USA	29	Summerlin	Top 20 — Miss International 2024 (Representing Cuba)				
Sklouchere Pierre	HTI	26	Lauderhill	Contestant — Miss Supranational 2025; Contestant — Miss Cosmo 2025				
Smriti Shrestha	NPL	24	Manthali	3rd Runner-Up — Miss Cosmopolitan World 2024				
Sophy Odom	AUS			Top 15 — Mrs. Globe 2025; Mrs. Global Tourism — Mrs. Tourism Queen International 2026 (Representing Cambodia)				
Tracy Nabukeera	TZA	23	Dar es Salaam	Top 12 — Miss Supranational 2026				
Valentina Gegprifti	ALB	19	Elbasan	1st Runner-Up — The Miss Globe 2025				
Vanessa Pulgarín	COL	34	Medellín	Contestant — Miss International 2017; Top 12 — Miss Universe 2025; Winner — MGI All Stars 1st Edition	TBD			
Yara Bishi	PSE	24	Ramallah	Contestant — Miss Earth 2023; Contestant — Miss Grand International 2025				
Yuly Pirona	CAN	30	Montreal	Contestant — Reina Hispanoamericana 2022				
