= Ann Colis =

Filipino actress and model

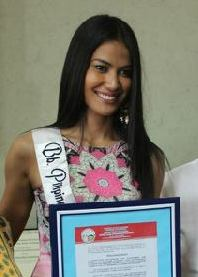
- Colis in 2015
- Born: Ann Lorraine Maniego Colis; September 15, 1993 (age 33); Mexico, Pampanga, Philippines
- Height: 1.74 m (5 ft 8 1/2 in)
- Beauty pageant titleholder
- Title: Binibining Pilipinas Tourism 2015; Binibining Pilipinas Globe 2015; The Miss Globe 2015
- Hair color: Black
- Eye color: Brown
- Major competitions: Binibining Pilipinas 2015; (Winner – Binibining Pilipinas Tourism 2015); The Miss Globe 2015; (Winner)

Ann Lorraine Maniego Colis (born September 15, 1993), simply known as Ann Colis, is a Filipino actress, model and beauty pageant titleholder who was crowned The Miss Globe 2015. Prior to that, she held the title of Binibining Pilipinas Tourism 2015, which was later upgraded to Binibining Pilipinas Globe 2015 after the Binibining Pilipinas organization acquired the franchise for The Miss Globe in August 2015.

== Background ==
Colis, was Binibini #24 at the Binibining Pilipinas 2015 pageant. She was a 20-year-old lass from Mexico, Pampanga who studied in the University of Santo Tomas with a degree in Management Accounting. She stands at 5’9″ and has been working as runway model for quite some time now. She was trained under Aces & Queens. She is currently doing modeling in the United States.

Ann also entered the world of acting as she played a role of a lesbian in an iWant series, Fluid.

== Pageantry ==
=== Binibining Pilipinas 2015 ===
Colis won the Binibining Pilipinas Tourism 2015 title for the supposed Miss Tourism Queen International 2015 pageant. She was appointed Binibining Pilipinas Globe 2015 after Binibining Pilipinas acquired the franchise for The Miss Globe pageant in August 2015.

=== The Miss Globe 2015 ===
Colis was upgraded from Binibining Pilipinas Tourism to Binibining Pilipinas Globe titleholder giving her the right to represent the Philippines at The Miss Globe 2015 pageant in Toronto, Canada on October 8, 2015.

The night of October 8, 2015 at the Rose Theatre Brampton in Toronto, Canada, Colis was officially and unanimously crowned as The Miss Globe 2015.

Awards and achievements
Preceded by Parul Shah	Binibining Pilipinas Tourism; 2015	Succeeded by Discontinued
Preceded by None	Binibining Pilipinas Globe; 2015	Succeeded by Nichole Manalo
Preceded by (Canada) Jacqueline Wojciechowski	The Miss Globe; 2015	Succeeded by (India) Dimple Patel
