= Kylie Verzosa =

Filipino actress, model, and beauty pageant titleholder (born 1992)

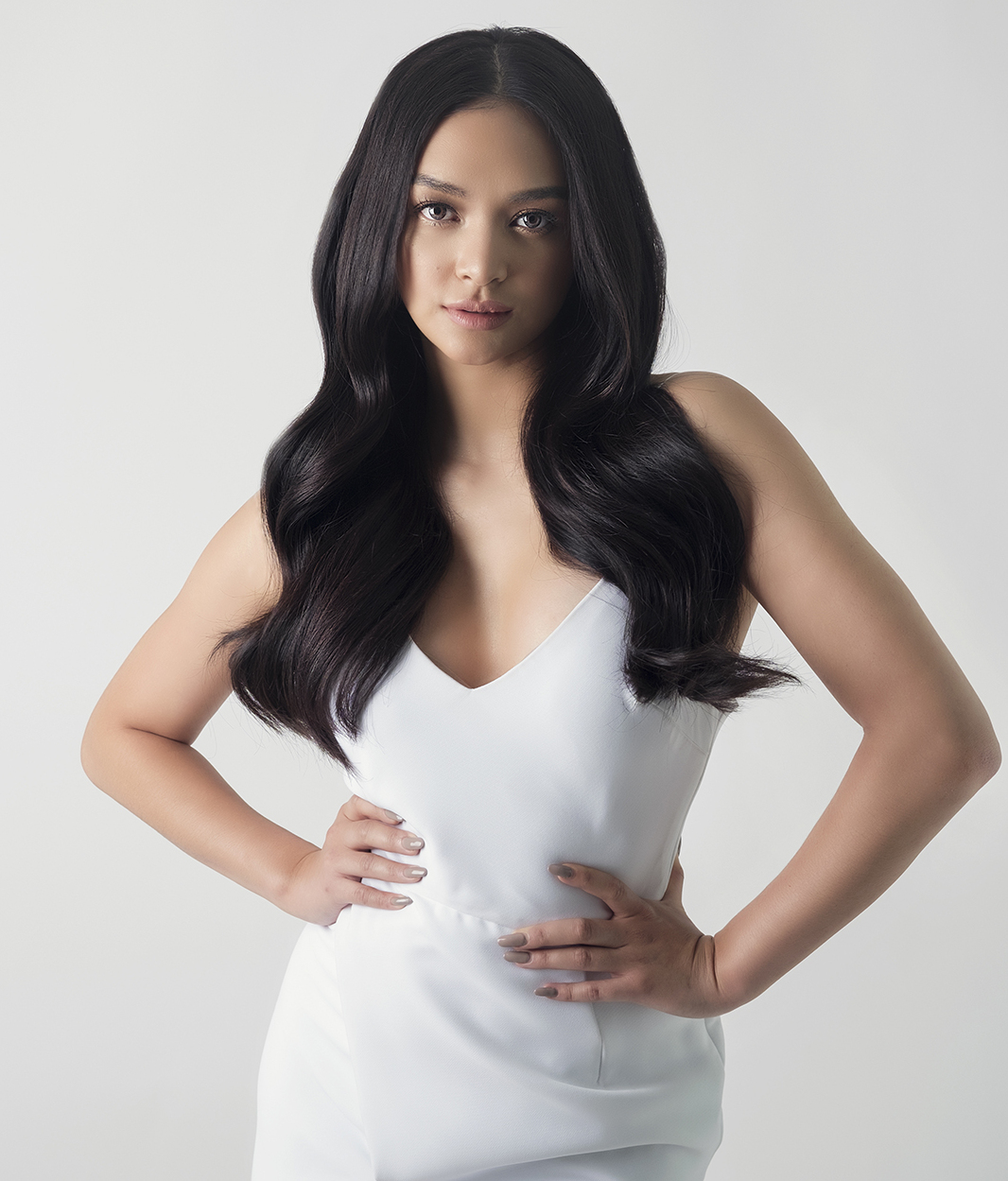
- Verzosa in 2018
- Born: Kylie Fausto Verzosa; February 7, 1992 (age 34); Baguio, Benguet, Philippines
- Education: Ateneo de Manila University (BS)
- Height: 1.74 m (5 ft 9 in)
- Beauty pageant titleholder
- Title: Binibining Pilipinas International 2016; Miss International 2016
- Years active: 2015–present
- Major competitions: Binibining Pilipinas 2015 (Top 15); Binibining Pilipinas 2016 (Winner – Binibining Pilipinas International 2016); Miss International 2016 (Winner)

Kylie Fausto Verzosa (Tagalog: [ˈkɐjli bɛɾˈsɔsɐ]; born February 7, 1992) is a Filipino actress, host, advocate, entrepreneur, and beauty queen who won the Binibining Pilipinas International 2016 title and was later crowned Miss International 2016. She is the sixth Filipina to win the Miss International title after Bea Santiago in 2013, and she is currently the last Filipina to win the title. She is also the founder and owner of SOLÁ Body, a Philippine-based shapewear brand.

== Early life and education ==
Kylie Fausto Verzosa was born in Baguio, Philippines, to Ari and Racquel Verzosa. She graduated high school from Saint Louis University, and obtained her Bachelor of Science degree in business management from the Ateneo de Manila University. She worked as a pre-school teacher at one point.

== Pageantry ==
=== Binibining Pilipinas ===
Verzosa first participated at the Binibining Pilipinas 2015, where she reached the top 15. She won Binibining Pilipinas International 2016 on April 17, 2016 at the Smart Araneta Coliseum, Quezon City, Philippines.

=== Miss International 2016 ===
Verzosa represented the Philippines and won Miss International 2016. She was crowned by Edymar Martínez of Venezuela. She is the sixth Miss International winner from the Philippines.

During the speech portion of the pageant, the contestants expressed their plans if crowned Miss International and shared their personal advocacies. Verzosa's speech read:

Three things come to mind when I think of Miss International: culture, education, and international understanding. These three work together to make the brand of the Miss International beauty pageant relevant to the global community and to our time. If I become Miss International 2016, I will devote myself to cultural understanding and international understanding because I believe that it is by developing in each of us sensitivity to other cultures that we expand our horizons, tolerate difference, and appreciate diversity. All this enables us to achieve international understanding. And I believe that I am prepared to take on this responsibility.

After the coronation, Verzosa and her court had some final things to do with the sponsors of the Miss International Organization such as Miss Paris' beauty school and Mikimoto pearl farm in Japan. Also, Miss International 2016 visited Toba International Hotel and Unicef where she met the National Directors of UNICEF in Denmark and Japan. She later crowned Kevin Lilliana of Indonesia as her successor in the Miss International 2017 pageant held in the Tokyo Dome City Hall in Tokyo, Japan on November 14, 2017.

== Career ==
Verzosa was a member of the Professional Models Association of the Philippines. She has done ramp and print modeling.

She is the CEO and founder of "Sola," a brand embodying empowerment and independence, as reflected in its Latin meaning: a woman who can stand on her own. Sola specializes in body shapers, offering five distinctive styles, available in three vibrant colors, and catered to six different sizes.

Kylie Verzosa co-manages the Philippine operations of the Japanese-funded real estate start-up PropertyAccess.

Verzosa starred in her first major film, the 2021 psychological thriller film The Housemaid, a Filipino adaptation of a 2010 Korean film. She acted alongside Albert Martinez and several veteran actors. She has gone on to appear in various Vivamax films.

On September 27, 2024, the Miss Cosmo Organization announced that Verzosa would host both the preliminary and grand final of the first Miss Cosmo 2024.

== Personal life ==
Verzosa is an advocate of mental health, depression, and suicide awareness. Verzosa volunteered for the Natasha Goulbourn Foundation, which aims to educate people about depression and suicide. She later on created Mental Health Matters, an online support group which aims to give emotional support to people who are experiencing depression, anxiety disorder, and other forms of mental illnesses.

In 2026, Verzosa announced her engagement to entrepreneur Emil Eriksen.

== Filmography ==
=== Film ===
| Year | Title | Role | Ref. |
|---|---|---|---|
| 2017 | Ang Panday | Diwata | |
| 2018 | Kasal | Eunice | |
| 2018 | Abay Babes | Perla | |
| 2019 | Ulan | Princess | |
| 2019 | S.O.N.S: Sons of Nanay Sabel | Helen | |
| 2020 | Love Lockdown | Karen | |
| 2020 | Love the Way U Lie | Sara | |
| 2021 | The Housemaid | Daisy | |
| 2021 | Revirginized | Czarina | |
| 2021 | My Husband, My Lover | Alice | |
| 2021 | Bekis on the Run | Adriana | |
| 2022 | Ikaw Lang ang Mamahalin | Lira | |
| 2022 | Sisid | Abby | |
| 2023 | Baby Boy Baby Girl | Josie | |
| 2023 | Penduko | Liway | |
| 2024 | Elevator | Bettina | |
| TBA | Osyana | Osyana | |

=== Television ===
| Year | Title | Role | Ref. |
|---|---|---|---|
| 2018 | Ipaglaban Mo: Hukay | Lara Miranda | |
| 2018–2019 | Precious Hearts Romances Presents: Los Bastardos | Dulce Rodriguez / Dulce Silverio | |
| 2018 | Wansapanataym: Gelli In A Bottle | Fairy Diana | |
| 2021 | Parang Kayo Pero Hindi | Daphne Mangahas m | |
| 2023 | Fit Check: Confessions of an Ukay Queen | Stella | |

Awards and achievements
| Preceded by (Venezuela) Edymar Martínez | Miss International; 2016 | Succeeded by (Indonesia) Kevin Lilliana |
| Preceded by Janicel Lubina (Palawan) | Binibining Pilipinas International; 2016 | Succeeded by Mariel de Leon (Las Piñas) |
