= Binibining Pilipinas =

Filipino beauty pageant

- Type: Women's beauty pageant
- Parent organization: Binibining Pilipinas Charities, Inc.
- Headquarters: Gateway Tower, Araneta City, Quezon City
- Country represented: Philippines
- Qualifies for: Miss International; The Miss Globe
- First edition: 1964
- Most recent edition: 2026
- Current titleholder: Gwendoline Meliz Soriano; Baguio
- President and CEO: Jorge León Araneta of the Araneta Group
- Chairpersons: Stella Marquez de Araneta; Cochitina Sevilla-Bernardo
- Language: Filipino; English
- Website: www.bbpilipinas.com

Binibining Pilipinas (abbreviated as Bb. Pilipinas or BBP; transl. Miss Philippines) is the oldest active national beauty pageant in the Philippines. Founded in 1964, it currently selects Filipina representatives to compete in one of the Big Four international beauty pageants—Miss International, as well as representatives to other international pageants, such as The Miss Globe.

== History ==
Binibining Pilipinas is owned by the Araneta Group of Companies headed by Filipino business magnate Jorge León Araneta, the group's President and CEO. The BPCI Organization is spearheaded by Jorge's wife, national director Stella Marquez-Araneta, with Conchitina Sevilla-Bernardo, artist and entrepreneur, as co-chairperson.

Stella M. Araneta, Miss Universe semi-finalist, and the winner of the first Miss International beauty pageant in 1960 representing Colombia, is the chairperson of Binibining Pilipinas Charities Incorporated (BPCI), which had been the official national franchise holder of the Miss Universe Organization from 1964 to 2019, after it was passed on by its predecessor, Miss Philippines, which had been the franchise holder from 1952 to 1963.

In its Diamond Jubilee edition, the pageant launched 'Beauty Ever After', a special edition coffee table book priced at P5,000. The book traces the pageant's legacy by featuring past Binibini queens, from 1969 Gloria Diaz to 2018 Catriona Gray.

The following are the Binibining Pilipinas titleholders throughout the years, including highlights of their performances in major and minor international pageants.

Winners of Big Four international beauty pageants:

- Four — Miss Universe winners:
  - Gloria Diaz (1969) • Margarita Moran (1973) • Pia Wurtzbach (2015) • Catriona Gray (2018)
- Five — Miss International winners:
  - Aurora Pijuan (1970) • Melanie Marquez (1979) • Lara Quigaman (2005) • Bea Santiago (2013) • Kylie Verzosa (2016)

Gemma Cruz-Araneta, Miss International 1964, the first Filipina and Asian Miss International winner, was a product of the now-defunct Miss Philippines pageant (1952–1963), not of Binibining Pilipinas, when she won the Miss International 1964 title. Cruz, however, was in attendance during the Binibining Pilipinas 1965 finals, and passed on her crown to her successor under BPCI, Isabel Barnett Santos, who represented the country in the Miss International 1965 competition.

Although BPCI had acquired the local franchise of the Miss World pageant in 1992, the first crown was won by Megan Young in 2013, who is a product of the Miss World Philippines Organization (2011—present).

Winners of other international pageants :

- Two — Miss Tourism International (Macau version) winners: Joanne Santos (1997) • Yuni Que (1998)
- One — Miss Tourism International (Anatolya Turkish version) winner: Michelle Cuevas Reyes (2001)
- One — Miss Globe International winner: Maricar Balagtas (2001)
- One — Miss Tourism International (Black Sea version) winner: Kristine Reyes Alzar (2002)
- One — Queen of Tourism International winner: Noela Mae Evangelista (2003)
- One — Miss Supranational winner: Mutya Datul (2013)
- Two — The Miss Globe winners: Ann Colis (2015) • Maureen Montagne (2021)
- Two — Miss Intercontinental winners: Karen Gallman (2018) • Cinderella Faye Obeñita (2021)

Number of wins under Binibining Pilipinas
Pageant	Wins
Miss Universe	4
Miss World	0
Miss International	5
Miss Supranational	1
Miss Grand International	0
Miss Intercontinental	2
The Miss Globe	2
Miss Tourism International (Macau)	2
Miss Tourism International (Turkey)	1
Miss Tourism International (Black Sea)	1
Miss Tourism Queen International	1
Miss Globe International	1
Miss Young International	0
Miss Maja International	0

== Titles ==
Note that the year designates the time Binibining Pilipinas has acquired that particular pageant franchise.

Current Franchises
Membership	Year
Miss International	1968 – Present
The Miss Globe	2015 – Present
Former Franchises
Membership	Year
Miss Universe	1964 – 2019
Miss World	1992 – 2010
Miss Supranational	2012 – 2019
Miss Grand International	2013, 2015 – 2022
Miss Intercontinental	2014 – 2022
Miss Tourism Queen International	2011 – 2014
Miss Maja International	1973 – 1992, 1995, 2004
Miss Young International	1970 – 1985
Special Titles
Title	Year
Miss Tourism	1987 – 1990, 1993 – 1994, 2005
Miss Press Photography	1984
Miss World Peace	1973

== Titleholders ==
Year	Binibining Pilipinas		Runners-Up		Ref.
Year	International	Globe	1st Runner-Up	2nd Runner-Up	Ref.
2022	Nicole Borromeo	Chelsea Lovely Fernandez	Herlene Nicole Budol	Stacey Daniella Gabriel	
2023	Angelica Lopez	Annalena Lakrini	Katrina Anne Johnson	Atasha Reign Parani	
2024	Myrna Esguerra	Jasmin Bungay	Christal Jean de la Cruz	Trisha Martinez	
2025	Katrina Anne Johnson	Annabelle Mae McDonnell	Dalia Khattab	Kathleen Enid Espenido	
2026	Gwendoline Meliz Soriano	Sasha-Juli Belle Lacuna	Julianne Raine Antonio	Tracy Mae Sunio	

== See also ==
- Philippines at major beauty pageants
- Big Four beauty pageants
- List of beauty pageants
- Miss Universe Philippines
- Miss World Philippines
- Binibining Pilipinas
- Miss Philippines Earth
- Reina Filipinas
- The Miss Philippines
- Miss Island Philippines
- Mutya ng Pilipinas
- Miss Pearl of the Orient Philippines
- Miss Republic of the Philippines
