= Anna Lakrini =

Filipino-German model and beauty pageant titleholder

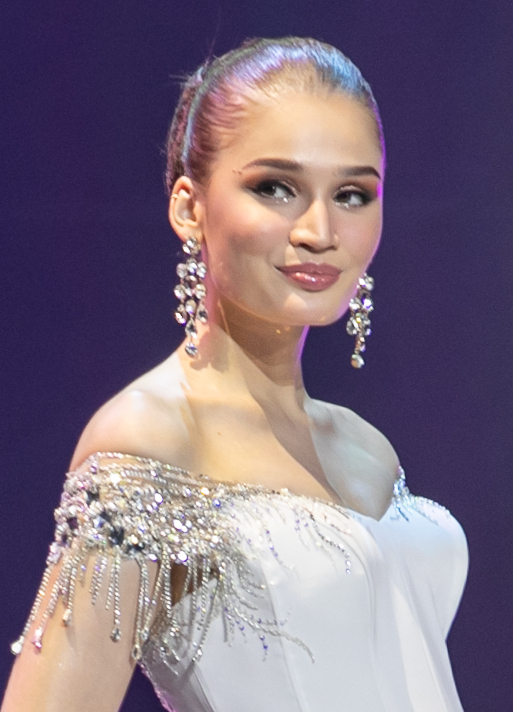
- Lakrini in 2022
- Born: Annalena Valencia Lakrini; November 5, 1997 (age 28); Stuttgart, Germany
- Education: University of Vienna
- Beauty pageant titleholder
- Title: Binibining Pilipinas Globe 2023; Miss Supranational Germany 2025
- Major competitions: Binibining Pilipinas 2022; (Top 12); Binibining Pilipinas 2023; (Winner – Binibining Pilipinas Globe 2023); (Best in Swimsuit); (Jag Denim Queen); The Miss Globe 2023; (2nd Runner-Up); Queen Of Germany 2025; (Winner – Miss Supranational Germany 2025); Miss Supranational 2025; (1st Runner-Up)

Annalena "Anna" Valencia Lakrini (Tagalog: [ˈʔana lɐkˈɾinɪ]; born November 5, 1997) is a Filipino and German beauty pageant titleholder who won Miss Supranational Germany 2025 and Binibining Pilipinas Globe 2023. She represented the Philippines at The Miss Globe 2023 competition and was second runner-up. She represented Germany at Miss Supranational 2025 and finished as first runner up.

== Early life ==
Annalena Valencia Lakrini was born on November 5, 1997 in Stuttgart, Germany.

In her youth, Lakrini participated in Santacruzan events held in Filipino communities within the country. In an interview with Inquirer, Lakrini stated that she faced discrimination in Germany for her skin color.

Since 2017, Lakrini has had a modelling career based in Germany, and participated at the MQ Vienna Fashion Week.

== Pageantry ==
Lakrini has been trained by Aces and Queens from 2022. She cites Miss Universe 2015 Pia Wurtzbach as her inspiration for pursuing pageantry.

=== Binibining Pilipinas 2023 ===
Lakrini won Binibining Pilipinas Globe 2023, representing the province of Bataan, on May 28, 2023 at the Smart Araneta Coliseum in Quezon City, Metro Manila, Philippines.

In the swimsuit competition, GMA Integrated News, said "she confidently showcased her fit figure and striking pasarela". She also won the Best in Swimsuit award, and the title of Jag Denim Queen.

Lakrini reached the top four, and in the final question-and-answer portion, she was asked by Honey Lacuna, the Mayor of Manila, "In what ways is a beauty pageant candidate aiming for a crown similar to a politician running for an electoral post?":

As someone who is joining for the second time, I know that a beauty pageant has a platform on which we can talk about causes that are dear to our hearts. My cause that is dear to my heart is nutrition. And as a nutritional scientist, as an advocate for proper nutrition, I know that in advocating with this platform from Binibining Pilipinas, we can inspire so many people. And a politician can inspire a whole community, and so can we. Lakrini responded:

At the end of the event, Lakrini was crowned Binibining Pilipinas Globe 2023 by outgoing titleholder Chelsea Fernandez.

=== The Miss Globe 2023 ===
Lakrini represented the Philippines at The Miss Globe 2023 held in Albania on November 17, 2023, and was second runner-up.

=== Miss Supranational 2025 ===
Lakrini represented Germany at Miss Supranational 2025, held at the Strzelecki Park Amphitheater in Nowy Sącz, Poland, on June 27, 2025, and was first runner-up to Eduarda Braum of Brazil.

== Personal life ==
Anna Valencia Lakrini works as a German language teacher.. Valencia Lakrini is also a maternal second cousin of Tarah Valencia who was the 3rd Runner Up on the same pageant batch of Miss Supranational where she won 1st Runner Up.

Awards and achievements
Preceded by (United States) Jenna Dykstra	1st Runner-Up Miss Supranational; 2025	Succeeded by (France) Eve Gilles
Preceded by Luisa Victoria Malz	Miss Supranational Germany; 2025	Succeeded by Andromeda Schuster
Preceded by (Albania) Drita Ziri	2nd Runner-Up The Miss Globe; 2023	Succeeded by (Philippines) Jasmin Bungay
Preceded by Chelsea Fernandez (Tacloban)	Binibining Pilipinas Globe; 2023	Succeeded by Jasmin Bungay (Pampanga)
