= Angelica Lopez =

Filipino model and beauty pageant titleholder

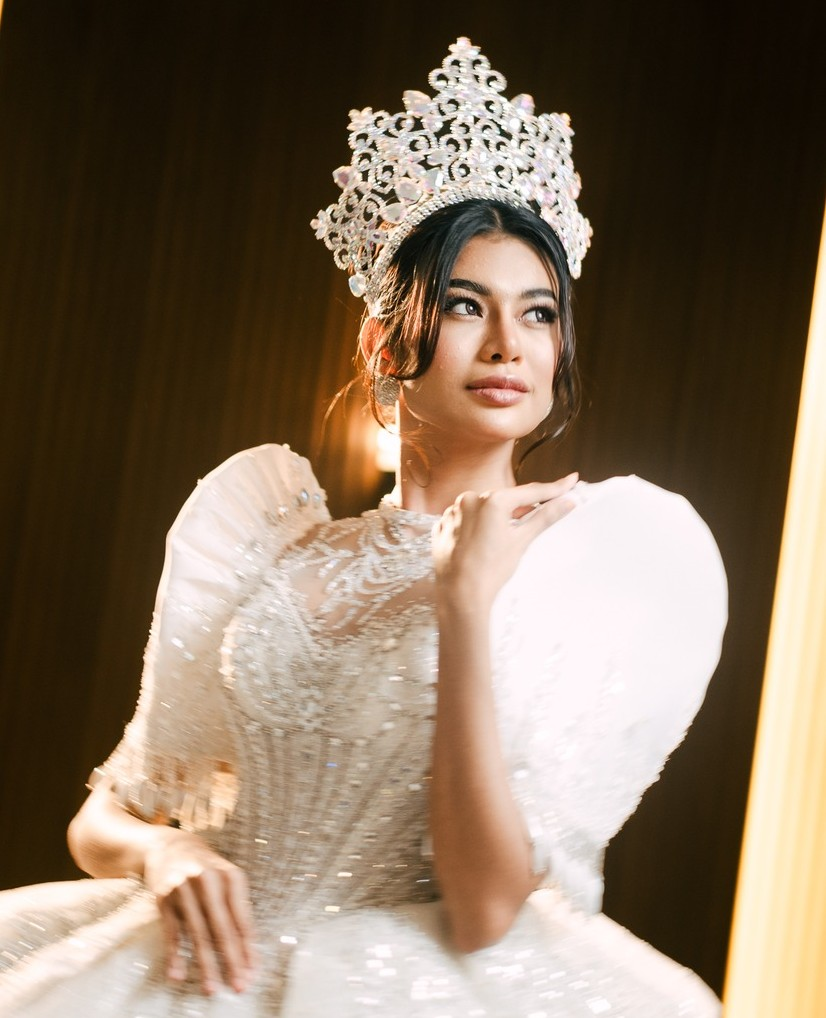
- Lopez in 2025
- Born: Bataraza, Palawan, Philippines
- Education: Palawan State University (BS)
- Beauty pageant titleholder
- Title: Binibining Pilipinas International 2023; Reina Filipinas Grand International 2026
- Major competitions: Miss Universe Philippines 2022; (Top 16); Miss Asia Global 2022; (1st Runner-Up); Binibining Pilipinas 2023; (Winner – Binibining Pilipinas International 2023); Miss International 2024; (Unplaced); Reina Filipinas 2026; (Winner – Reina Filipinas Grand International 2026); Miss Grand International 2026; (Top 25); (Best National Costume)

Angelica Lopez (Tagalog pronunciation: [ˈdɐnaʊ ˈlɔpɛs]) is a Filipino beauty pageant titleholder who won Binibining Pilipinas International 2023 and Reina Filipinas Grand International 2026. Representing the Philippines at Miss Grand International 2026, she reached the top 25, and won Best National costume.

== Early life and education ==
In June 2021, Lopez entered Palawan State University in Puerto Princesa, Philippines, to pursue a bachelor's degree in psychology.

== Pageantry ==
Lopez represented the province of Palawan, and competed at Miss Universe Philippines 2022, where she reached the top 16. Again representing Palawan, Lopez won Binibining Pilipinas International 2023, and was crowned by Binibining Pilipinas International 2022 Nicole Borromeo and Miss International 2022 Jasmin Selberg of Germany. Lopez represented the Philippines at Miss International 2024, and was unplaced. Representing Palawan, Lopez won Reina Filipinas Grand International 2026, and was crowned by Miss Grand International 2025 Emma Tiglao. Lopez represented the Philippines at Miss Grand International 2026, where she reached the top 25.

Awards and achievements
Preceded by Emma Tiglao (Pampanga)	Miss Grand Philippines; 2026	Incumbent
Preceded by Nicole Borromeo (Cebu)	Binibining Pilipinas International; 2023	Succeeded by Myrna Esguerra (Abra)
