= Miss Eco International 2025 =

10th Edition of Miss Eco International

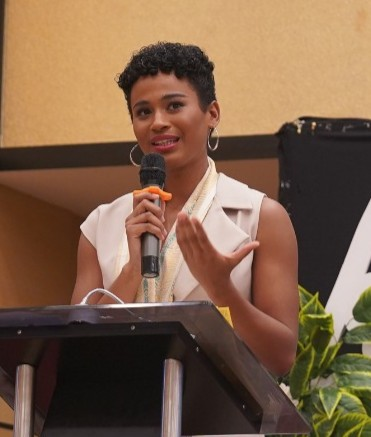
- Alexie Brooks
- Date: April 19, 2025
- Hosts: Nancy Magdy
- Venue: Hilton Green Plaza in Alexandria, Egypt
- Broadcaster: Streaming: YouTube
- Entrants: 36
- Placements: 20
- Debuts: Tatarstan; Uganda; Uzbekistan
- Withdrawals: Albania; Aruba; Australia; Belarus; Colombia; Ecuador; France; Haiti; Iraq; Kosovo; North Macedonia; Malaysia; Portugal; Romania; South Korea; Trinidad and Tobago
- Returns: Algeria; Botswana; Finland; Kenya; Moldova; New Zealand; Zimbabwe
- Winner: Alexie Brooks; Philippines
- Best National Costume: Alexie Brooks (Philippines)
- Best Evening Gown: Brenda Matos (Brazil)
- Miss Eco Top Model: Diana Del Rey (Mexico)

Miss Eco International 2025 was the 10th Miss Eco International pageant, held on 19 April 2025 at the Alzahraa Ballroom, Hilton Green Plaza in Alexandria, Egypt.

Angelina Usanova of Ukraine crowned Alexie Brooks of the Philippines as her successor at the end of the event, marking the country's third title of the pageant.

== Results ==
=== Placements ===
Placement	Contestant
Miss Eco International 2025	Philippines – Alexie Brooks
1st Runner-Up	Indonesia – Yulinar Fitriani
2nd Runner-Up	Ukraine – Yelyzaveta Adamska
3rd Runner-Up	United States – Cynthia Murillo
4th Runner-Up	United Kingdom – Victoria Repollo
Top 11	Brazil – Brenda Matos; Canada – Julianne Nieh; Costa Rica – Camille Alvarado; Egypt – Sarah George; Thailand – Natthakan Kunchayawanat; Venezuela – Luisa Pacheco
Top 21	Algeria – Fella Kacemi; Belgium – Maité Rodrigus; Czech Republic – Jana Marvanová; Japan – Miu Sakurai; Mexico – Diana del Rey Duque; Nepal - Sanskriti Bhatta; Nigeria – Blessing Dietake; Netherlands – Sanne Schulz; South Africa – Gugulethu Mayisela; Zimbabwe – Sindiso Foulkes

§ – Voted into the Top 11 by viewers
Δ – Automatically placed into the Top 20 for winning the best in national costume

=== Continental Queens ===
Continental titles	Candidates
Miss Eco Africa	South Africa – Gugulethu Mosibudi Mayisela
Miss Eco America	Mexico – Diana del Rey Duque
Miss Eco Asia	Japan – Miu Sakurai
Miss Eco Europe	Czech Republic – Jana Marvanová
Miss Eco Oceania	New Zealand – Aileen Arnaldo

=== Special awards ===
Awarda	Candidates
Best in National Costume	Philippines – Alexie Brooks
Best Evening Gown	Brazil – Brenda Matos
Best Eco Video	Indonesia – Yulinar Fitrani
Best in Talent	(gold) Canada – Julianne Nieh; (silver) Philippines – Alexie Brooks; (bronze) Japan – Miu Sakurai
Best Resort Wear	(gold) United Kingdom – Victoria Repollo Inglis; (silver) Costa Rica – Camille Valverde Alvarado; (bronze) Algeria – Fella Kacemi; 4 Venezuela – Luisa Fernanda Guzmán Pacheco; 5 Nigeria – Blessing Dietake
Best Eco Dress	(gold) Ukraine – Yelyzaveta Adamska; (silver) United States – Cynthia Murillo; (bronze) Venezuela – Luisa Fernanda Guzmán Pacheco
Miss Eco Top Model	Mexico – Diana del Rey Duque
People's Choice Award	Ukraine – Yelyzaveta Adamska

== Candidates ==
36 candidates confirmed to compete the title:

Country/Territory	Candidates	Age (Note: Ages during the competition)
Algeria	Fella Kacemi	
Belgium	Maité Rodrigus	
Botswana	Edith Segokgo	
Brazil	Brenda Matos	27
Canada	Julianne Nieh	
China	Zulimire Tuerxun	
Costa Rica	Camille Valverde Alvarado	
Czech Republic	Jana Marvanová	27
Egypt	Sarah George	
Finland	Selja Maria Helena Kolu	
India	Ayushi Verma	
Indonesia	Yulinar Fitriani	
Japan	Miu Sakurai	
Kenya	Felister Chepchumba	
Mexico	Diana del Rey Duque	
Moldova	Sabrina Erian Gore	
Nepal	Sanskriti Bhatta	
Netherlands	Sanne Schulz	
New Zealand	Aileen Arnaldo	
Nigeria	Blessing Dietake	
Paraguay	Eliana Ovelar Penayo	
Philippines	Alexie Mae Caimoso Brooks	24
Russia	Anna Atamanova	
South Africa	Gugulethu Mosibudi Mayisela	
Spain	Valentina Carrillo	
Thailand	Natthakan Kunchayawanat	
Taiwan	Ting Yi Zheng	
Tatarstan	Liliia Ainutdinova	
Ukraine	Yelyzaveta Adamska	26
Uganda	Josemary Kamuli	
United Kingdom	Victoria Repollo Inglis	20
United States	Cynthia Murillo	
Uzbekistan	Elnara Natsibulina	
Venezuela	Luisa Fernanda Guzmán Pacheco	23
Vietnam	Le Thi Phuong Thuy	
Zimbabwe	Sindiso Ndlovu Foulkes	
