= Binibining Pilipinas 2023 =

59th Binibining Pilipinas pageant

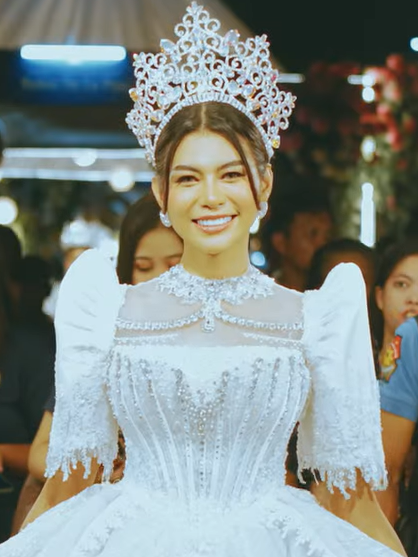
- Angelica Lopez
- Date: May 28, 2023
- Hosts: Catriona Gray; Nicole Cordoves; Mary Jean Lastimosa
- Entertainment: Vice Ganda; Darren Espanto; Alamat
- Venue: Smart Araneta Coliseum, Quezon City, Metro Manila, Philippines
- Broadcaster: ABS-CBN
- Entrants: 40
- Placements: 11
- Winner: Angelica Lopez; Palawan
- Congeniality: Mary Chiles Balana, Hermosa, Bataan
- Best National Costume: Jeanne Isabelle Bilasano, Albay
- Photogenic: Julia Mae Mendoza, Roxas, Capiz

Binibining Pilipinas 2023 was the 59th edition of Binibining Pilipinas, held on May 28, 2023 at the Smart Araneta Coliseum in Quezon City, Metro Manila, Philippines.

At the end of the event, Nicole Borromeo crowned Angelica Lopez of Palawan as Binibining Pilipinas International 2023 and Chelsea Fernandez crowned Anna Lakrini of Bataan as Binibining Pilipinas Globe 2023. Katrina Anne Johnson of Davao del Sur was named first runner-up while Atasha Reign Parani of General Trias, Cavite was named second runner-up. Only two titles were awarded after Binibining Pilipinas Charities, Inc. lost the franchise for Miss Grand International and Miss Intercontinental.

ABS-CBN broadcast the coronation night via Kapamilya Channel and A2Z. The pageant was simulcast on ABS-CBN's Metro Channel and livestreamed on iWantTFC and YouTube. The competition was hosted by Catriona Gray, Nicole Cordoves, and Mary Jean Lastimosa, and with a performance from Vice Ganda.

== Pageant ==
=== Selection of participants ===
On January 6, 2023, the organization launched its search for the next set of Filipinas who will represent the Philippines at different international pageants. The final submission of the application was on January 31, 2023. The final screening and selection of the official contestants were done on February 6, 2023.

=== Selection committee ===
The following served as members of Binibining Pilipinas 2023 board of judges:

- Hidilyn Diaz – Olympic gold medalist
- William Vincent Araneta Marcos – software engineer and the youngest son of Philippine president, Bongbong Marcos
- Jasmin Selberg – Miss International 2022 from Germany
- Peter Zwiener – President and Co-Founder of Wolfgang's Steakhouse
- Hon. Honey Lacuna-Pangan – first female Mayor in the City of Manila and Chairman of the Board of Judges
- Piolo Pascual – Actor
- Small Laude – social media personality, content creator and businesswoman
- Anton San Diego – Editor-in-Chief of Philippine Tatler
- Dolly de Leon – actress and the first Filipino actor to be nominated at the BAFTA and Golden Globe Awards
- Josh Cullen – singer, rapper and member of SB19

== Results ==
=== Placements ===
Color keys

- The contestant was a runner-up in an International pageant.
- The contestant was a semi-finalist in an International pageant.
- The contestant did not place.

Placement	Contestant	International placement
Binibining Pilipinas International 2023	Bb. #6 Palawan – Angelica Lopez	Unplaced– Miss International 2024 (Ranked 21st)
Binibining Pilipinas Globe 2023	Bb. #24 Bataan – Anna Lakrini	2nd runner-up – The Miss Globe 2023
1st runner-up	Bb. #33 Davao del Sur – Katrina Anne Johnson	
2nd runner-up	Bb. #16 General Trias – Atasha Reign Parani	
Top 11	Bb. #11 Cabanatuan – Kiaragiel Gregorio; Bb. #14 Albay – Jeanne Isabelle Bilasano; Bb. #15 Aklan – Jessilen Salvador; Bb. #29 Laguna – Trisha Martinez; Bb. #36 Hermosa, Bataan – Mary Chiles Balana; Bb. #38 Dinalupihan, Bataan – Lea Macapagal; Bb. #39 Bulacan – Loraine Jara §	

§ – Bingo Plus fan-vote winner

=== Special awards ===
Award	Contestant
Bb. Pizza Hut	Bb. #31 Cagayan de Oro – April Angelu Barro
Jag Denim Queen	Bb. #24 Bataan – Anna Lakrini
Bb. Ever Bilena	Bb. #29 Laguna – Trisha Martinez
Bb. Careline	Bb. #14 Albay – Jeanne Isabelle Bilasano
Bb. Blackwater	Bb. #3 Pampanga – Lyra Punsalan
Bb. Hello Glow	Bb. #38 Dinalupihan, Bataan – Lea Macapagal
Bb. Ever Organics	Bb. #33 Davao del Sur – Katrina Johnson
Bb. Spotlight	Bb. #6 Palawan – Angelica Lopez
Bb. Hyaloo	Bb. #5 Palayan– Gianna Llanes
Bb. Philippine Airlines	Bb. #29 Laguna – Trisha Martinez
Manila Bulletin Readers' Choice	Bb. #32 Ortigas, Pasig – Sharmaine Magdasoc
Bb. Bingo Plus	Bb. #39 Bulacan – Loraine Jara
Best in National Costume	Bb. #14 Albay – Jeanne Isabelle Bilasano
Face of Binibini (Miss Photogenic)	Bb. #19 Roxas City - Julia Mae Mendoza
Bb. Friendship	Bb. #36 Hermosa, Bataan- Mary Chiles Balana
Best in Talent	Bb. #40 Catanduanes – Candy Marilyn Völlinger
Best in Swimsuit	Bb. #24 Bataan – Anna Lakrini
Best in Evening Gown	Bb. #29 Laguna – Trisha Martinez

== Contestants ==
Forty candidates competed for the two titles.

No.	Locality	Contestant	Age (Note: Ages at the time of the pageant)
1	Quezon City	Juvel Cyrene Bea	27
2	Zambales	Elaiza Dee Alzona	26
3	Pampanga	Lyra Guina Punsalan	22
4	Naga, Bicol	Paulina Marie Labayo	26
5	Palayan	Gianna Llanes	28
6	Palawan	Angelica Lopez	22
7	Parañaque	Allhia Charmaine Estores	27
8	Angeles	Mirjan Hipolito	26
9	Tacloban	Babyerna Liong	26
10	Urdaneta	Rasha Cortez Al Enzi	24
11	Cabanatuan	Kiaragiel Gregorio	26
12	Pasig (Santolan)	Xena Ramos	23
13	Oriental Mindoro	Samantha Dana Bug-os	24
14	Albay	Jeanne Isabelle Bilasano	25
15	Aklan	Jessilen Salvador	25
16	General Trias	Atasha Reign Parani	19
17	Iloilo	Tracy Lois Bedua	25
18	Morong, Bataan	Andrea Marie Sulangi	27
19	Roxas City	Julia Mae Mendoza	27
20	Cavite	Julianne Rose Reyes	19
21	Batangas	Paola Allison Araño	23
22	Quezon	Anje Mae Manipol	26
23	Manila	Zoe Bernardo Santiago	26
24	Bataan	Anna Lakrini	25
25	Caloocan	Yesley Cabanos	25
26	Camarines Sur	Rheema Adakkoden	22
27	Tarlac	Zeah Nestle Pala	23
28	Tarlac City	Katrina Mae Fallorin Sese	26
29	Laguna	Trisha Martinez	25
30	General Luna, Quezon	Charismae Almarez	25
31	Cagayan de Oro	April Angelu Barro	25
32	Pasig (Ortigas)	Sharmaine Magdasoc	27
33	Davao del Sur	Katrina Anne Johnson	25
34	Cebu	Mary Joy Dacoron	27
35	Rizal	Sofia Lopez Galve	25
36	Hermosa, Bataan	Mary Chiles Balana	25
37	Misamis Occidental	Pia Isabel Duloguin	23
38	Dinalupihan, Bataan	Lea Macapagal	26
39	Bulacan	Loraine Jara	25
40	Catanduanes	Candy Marilyn Völlinger	28
