= Miss Universe Philippines 2025 =

6th Miss Universe Philippines pageant

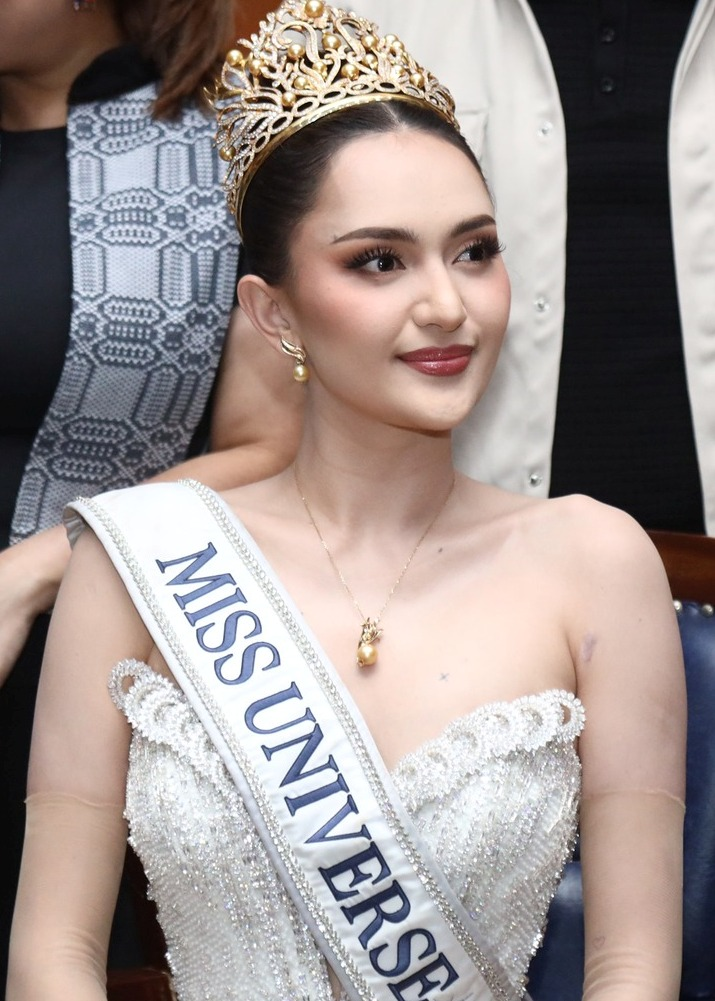
- Ahtisa Manalo
- Date: May 2, 2025
- Presenters: Xian Lim; Gabbi Garcia; Erika Kristensen-Lee; Tim Yap
- Entertainment: James Reid; Marlo Mortel; Sam Hashimoto; Alvaro Flores; Kane Gabriel
- Theme: Love Above All
- Venue: SM Mall of Asia Arena, Pasay
- Broadcaster: YouTube
- Entrants: 66
- Placements: 24
- Debuts: Bago, Negros Occidental; Basey, Samar; Benguet; Butuan; Caloocan; Camarines Norte; Davao Region; Dipolog; Dumaguete; Guipos; Ifugao; Kalibo; Liliw; Los Baños, Laguna; Malay, Aklan; Naga, Camarines Sur; Negros Occidental; Ozamiz; Samar Island; San Fernando, Cebu; San Jose, Batangas; Siniloan, Laguna; Sultan Kudarat; Tandag; Tarlac
- Withdrawals: Bantayan Island; Bukidnon; Cabanatuan; Cagayan de Oro; Cainta; Cebu; Davao Region; Kananga; Lucban; Mandaue; Mariveles; Miami; Pagadian; Palawan; San Pablo, Laguna; Talisay, Cebu; Toledo, Cebu; Zambales; Zamboanga City
- Returns: Camarines Sur; Ilocos Sur; Iloilo; Isabela; Lapu-Lapu City; Las Piñas; Lucena; Muntinlupa; Oriental Mindoro; Parañaque; Pasay; Romblon
- Winner: Ahtisa Manalo; Quezon
- Best National Costume: Gwendoline Soriano; Baguio; Allyson Ee; Caloocan; Valerie West; Ifugao; Angeline Kailani; Iloilo; Chelsea Fernandez; Sultan Kudarat

External videos
- Miss Universe Philippines 2025 THE CORONATION
- Miss Universe Philippines 2025 THE PRELIMINARIES
- Miss Universe Philippines 2025 National Costume Showcase
- Miss Universe Philippines 2025 PRELIMINARY INTERVIEWS

Miss Universe Philippines 2025 was the sixth Miss Universe Philippines pageant, held at the SM Mall of Asia Arena in Pasay, on May 2, 2025. It was the first pageant held under the national directorship of Ariella Arida.

Ahtisa Manalo of Quezon won the competition, succeeding Chelsea Manalo of Bulacan. She represented the Philippines at the Miss Universe 2025, where she placed as the third runner-up. Selected candidates from this batch also received titles from the pageant's sister organization, The Miss Philippines.

The contest was broadcast on the YouTube channel of Empire Philippines and was presented by Xian Lim, Gabbi Garcia, Erika Kristensen-Lee, and Tim Yap. James Reid and Marlo Mortel performed in the event.

== Background ==
On February 15, 2025, Ariella Arida, Miss Universe Philippines 2013, was designated as the national director of the pageant after the incumbent director, Shamcey Supsup-Lee, launched a bid for councilor in the 2025 Pasig local elections. The pageant announced that Arida's role as national director will emphasize the training and development of its competitors.

SM Mall of Asia Arena, the venue for the pageant

=== Selection of participants ===
Contestants from 69 localities were selected to compete for the title through the pageant's accredited partners. The competitors were confirmed and introduced during a press presentation at the Makati Shangri-La, Manila, on February 15, 2025.

==== Debuts and returns ====
This edition marked the debut of Basey, Butuan, Dipolog, Guipos, Iligan, Kalibo, Los Baños, Laguna, Negros Occidental, Samar, Sultan Kudarat, Tandag, and Tarlac. Additionally, this edition featured the returns of Camarines Sur, Muntinlupa, and Oriental Mindoro, which all last competed in 2020; Angeles City and Romblon which both last competed in 2021; and Isabela, Lapu-Lapu City, Parañaque, and San Fernando, Cebu, which last competed in 2023.

For the first time in the pageant's run, representatives of Filipino communities from Australia, Eastern Canada, England, Florida, Great Britain, Hawaii, Melbourne, New Jersey, New York, Northern California, Pennsylvania, San Francisco, Sydney, Southern California, Virginia, Washington, and Western Canada, are required to represent a locality in the Philippines. As a result, candidates from these communities will each represent two localities.

==== Withdrawals and replacements ====
Before the press presentation on February 15, two local titleholders relinquished their titles: Krizza Yco of Pampanga, to prioritize her studies; and Faith Genobaten of Dipolog, for personal reasons. They were succeeded by Rhancoise Mayangitan and Jazzle Iba, respectively.

Out of the 69 contestants subsequently confirmed, nine announced their withdrawal before the coronation night: Chella Falconer of Cebu, Maica Martinez of Cabanatuan, KC Joy Defiesta of Zamboanga City, Princess Ryla Fernandez of Alberta, Canada, Kriezl Jane Torres of Bukidnon, Hanna Michelle Gilmore of Los Angeles, Stefanie Przewodnik of Mandaue, Jamaica Long of Palawan, and Ybonne Ortega of Sindangan.

Princess Nanda Ibrahim was initially set to represent Dapitan, but she resigned from her local title and was instead appointed as the candidate for Guipos, Zamboanga del Sur. Irish Raine Sescon was originally going to represent Pagadian, but she also resigned her local title and was appointed as the candidate for Ozamiz instead.

=== Location and date ===
On March 13, the organization scheduled the finals for May 2. The pageant was held at the SM Mall of Asia Arena in Pasay for the fourth consecutive year.

== Results ==
=== Placements ===
Map of the participating localities and the placements of their respective delegates.

Placement	Contestant
Miss Universe Philippines 2025	Quezon – Ahtisa Manalo
1st Runner-Up	Muntinlupa – Winwyn Marquez
2nd Runner-Up	Siniloan – Yllana Aduana §
Top 6	Cebu City – Gabbi Carballo; Sultan Kudarat – Chelsea Fernandez; Taguig – Katrina Llegado §
Top 12	Baguio – Gwendoline Soriano; Bohol – Tyra Goldman; Iligan – Juliana Fresado; Laguna – Eloisa Jauod; Pasay – Amanda Russo; Quirino – Bianca Ylanan
Top 24	Benguet – Maiko Ibarde §; Bulacan – Franchezca Pacheco ‡; Davao – Angeleyh Pasco; Ifugao – Valerie West; Isabela – Jarina Sandhu; Lucena – Bella Dela Cruz ∆; Malay – Taylor DeLuna; Manila – Jasmine Paguio; Nueva Ecija – Chanel Thomas; Occidental Mindoro – Ain Niqyla Abad; Oriental Mindoro – Rechel Hoco; Tarlac – Sasha Lacuna

^‡ Automatically qualified as a semifinalist after winning the "Bingo Plus Fan Vote"
^§ Automatically qualified as a semifinalist, as the Top 3 of the "Piña PH Fan Vote"
^∆ Automatically qualified as a semifinalist after winning the "Choicely Fan Vote"

=== Appointments ===
Shortly after the coronation night, the remaining top 6 delegates were given the choice to represent the country in three international beauty pageants.

Title	Contestant	International Placement
The Miss Philippines Supranational 2026	Taguig – Katrina Llegado	Winner – Miss Supranational 2026
The Miss Philippines Eco International 2026	Cebu City – Gabbi Carballo	Top 21 – Miss Eco International 2026
The Miss Philippines Cosmo 2025	Sultan Kudarat – Chelsea Fernandez	Runner-Up – Miss Cosmo 2025

=== Special awards ===
A few hours after the coronation night, the Miss Universe Philippines organization announced the Top 5 winners of the National Costume competition. This year's competition showcase takes on the theme of mythical creatures, where the contestants were encouraged to take inspiration from creatures or individuals from Philippine mythology and folklore.

Award	Contestant/s
Best National Costume	Baguio – Gwendoline Soriano; Caloocan – Allyson Ee; Ifugao – Valerie West; Iloilo – Angeline Kailani; Sultan Kudarat – Chelsea Fernandez

=== Sponsor Awards ===
Award	Contestant
Glutalipo People’s Choice	Siargao – Millien Joy Cabigas
Hello Glow Body	Sultan Kudarat – Chelsea Fernandez
Miss Buscopan Venus	Sultan Kudarat – Chelsea Fernandez
Miss Aqua Boracay	Muntinlupa – Winwyn Marquez
Miss Clinique De Paris	Muntinlupa – Winwyn Marquez
Miss Jell Life	Muntinlupa – Winwyn Marquez
Miss SOEN	Muntinlupa – Winwyn Marquez
Miss Wendy’s	Muntinlupa – Winwyn Marquez
Miss Wuling	Muntinlupa – Winwyn Marquez
Miss Zion	Muntinlupa – Winwyn Marquez
Miss Glam Photogenic	Iligan – Juliana Fresado
Miss Glutalipo	Siniloan – Yllana Aduana
Miss iColor	Siniloan – Yllana Aduana
Miss Urban Smiles	Siniloan – Yllana Aduana
Miss Hello Glow	Quezon – Ahtisa Manalo
Miss Jewelmer	Quezon – Ahtisa Manalo
Miss Vitress	Quezon – Ahtisa Manalo
Miss Mags (Face of Mags)	Muntinlupa – Winwyn Marquez; Quezon – Ahtisa Manalo; Siniloan – Yllana Aduana
Zonrox Colorsafe	Quezon – Ahtisa Manalo; Siniloan – Yllana Aduana; Taguig – Katrina Llegado

== Pageant ==
=== Format ===
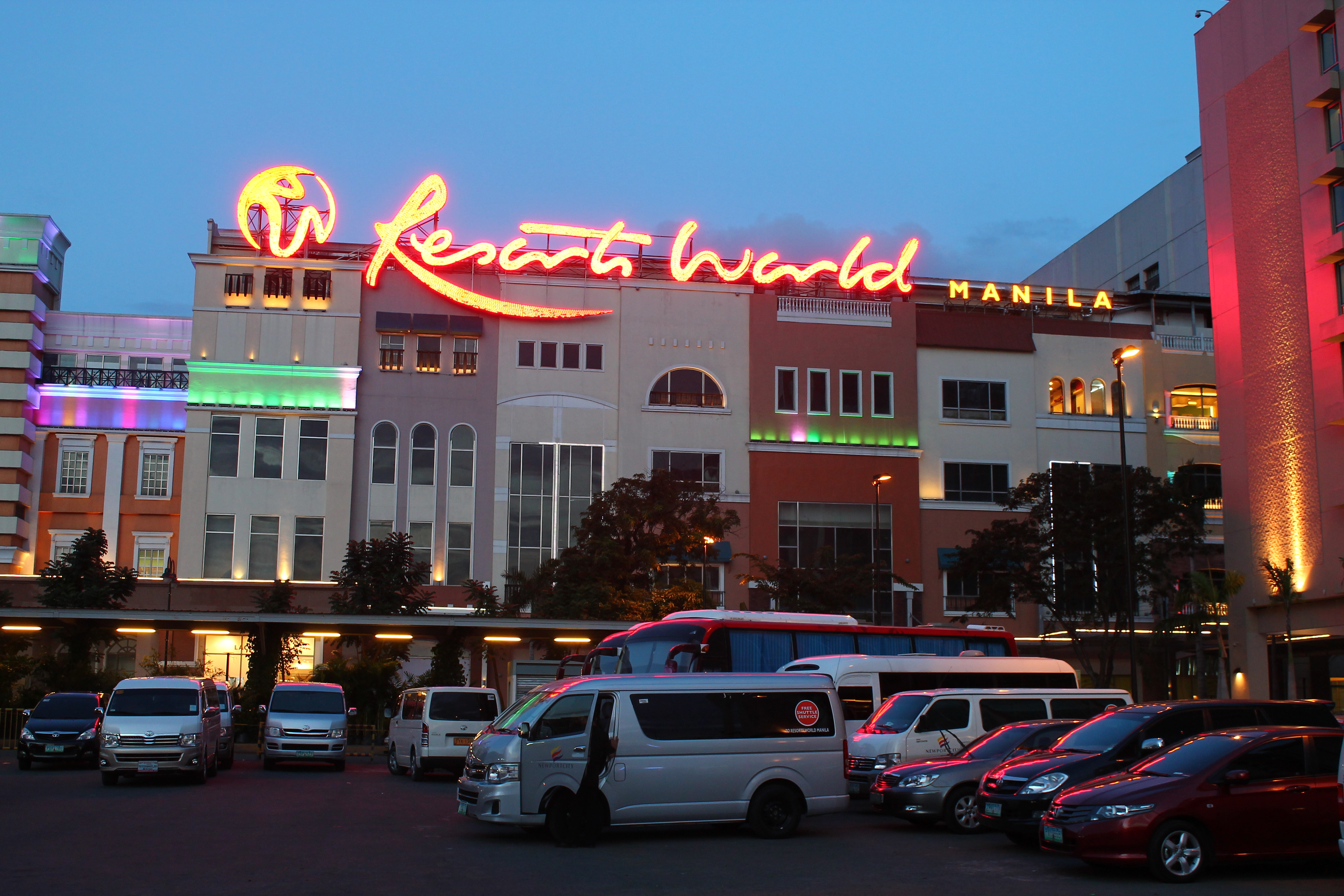
The preliminary competition was held at the Newport Performing Arts Theater at the Newport World Resorts (pictured in 2012).

The results of the preliminary competition, held on April 28, 2025, at the Newport Performing Arts Theater in Pasay, determined the first 19 semifinalists. The event evaluated the 66 delegates in the swimsuit and evening gown segments, along with closed-door interviews. Five additional delegates advanced through fan vote challenges—three through Pina Beauty, one via BingoPlus, and one via the Miss Universe Philippines app—bringing the total number of semifinalists to 24, an increase of four from the previous edition.

During the coronation night, the semifinalists competed in the swimsuit competition, after which the field was narrowed to 12. Afterward, the twelve competed in the evening gown round, from which five finalists were selected, along with one more delegate selected through the Pina Beauty Fan Vote, creating a total of six finalists. The finalists then competed in the question-and-answer portion, where Miss Universe Philippines 2025 was ultimately crowned.

=== Selection committee ===
The panel of judges for the pageant consisted of:

- Mia Arcenas-Branellec – founder of Mia Arcenas Atelier, and wife of Jacques Branellec, the chief executive officer of Jewelmer
- Celeste Cortesi – Miss Universe Philippines 2022 and founder of lip-care brand Azul
- Ralph Figueroa Delas Alas – chief executive officer of Urban Smiles Dental Clinic
- Crystal Jacinto – chief executive officer and founder of Jell Life and Conti’s
- Rissa Mananquil-Trillo – editor-in-chief of Allure Philippines
- Cole Micek – actor, model, and professional 3x3 basketball player
- Bran Ferrer Reluao – founder of RepublicAsia
- Shamcey Supsup-Lee – Miss Universe Philippines 2011
- Bianca Umali – actress
- Rafael Jasper Vicencio – director of DiGi Plus Interactive Corp.

In addition to the ten judges, the public voted in real-time as the eleventh judge in each stage of the coronation night.

=== Broadcast ===
The pageant was live-streamed online on the Empire Philippines YouTube channel. On free television, GMA Network and its affiliate GTV aired a delayed broadcast of the competition on May 4. James Reid, Marlo Mortel, and Empire PH talents Kane Gabriel, Sam Hashimoto, and Alvaro Flores performed in select segments of the event.

== Contestants ==
Sixty-six contestants competed for the title.

Locality (Note: The contestants from the overseas Filipino Communities will represent their local hometowns instead)	Contestant	Age (Note: Ages at the time of the competition)	Hometown	Notes
Albay	Rani Dado	25	Tabaco	
Angeles City	Ira de Castro	21	Angeles	Competed at Beauty of the Netherlands 2026, representing Eemland
Bacolod	Louise Bobe	28	Bacolod	Top 12 at Mutya ng Pilipinas 2017
Bacoor	Natsumi Sekiguchi	20	Bacoor	
Bago (San Francisco, California, U.S.)	Kayla Usison	26	San Francisco	Crowned Miss Asia Pacific USA 2025
Baguio	Gwendoline Soriano	26	Labrador	Top 10 at Miss Millennial Philippines 2019; Won Binibining Pilipinas International 2026
Basey	Yoshabel Lebico	22	Basey	
Batangas	Yana Maranan	22	Tanauan	
Benguet	Maiko Ibarde	26	La Trinidad	
Bohol	Tyra Goldman	23	Danao	Won Mutya Pilipinas Tourism International 2019; Top 15 finalist at Top Model of the World 2019
Bulacan	Franchezca Pacheco	22	Meycauayan	
Butuan	Jadine Banagan	21	Butuan	
Caloocan (Northern California, U.S.)	Allyson Ee	25	Santa Barbara	Won Miss International Malaysia 2025
Camarines Norte (Australia)	Karenza de Leon	27	Quakers Hill	
Camarines Sur	Shaina Rabacal	25	Buhi	
Camiguin	Larsine Jensen	20	Mambajao	
Cavite	Jezreal de Ocampo	24	Naic	
Cebu City	Gabbi Carballo	26	Cebu City	Won Miss Eco International Philippines 2026
Davao (Hawaii)	Angeleyh Pasco	20	O'ahu	Top 15 at Miss Grand Philippines 2025
Dipolog	Jazzle Shannen Iba	18	Baliguian	
Dumaguete (Great Britain)	Shamara Krupa	18	Leicester	
Guipos	Princess Nanda Ibrahim	18	Guipos	
Ifugao (New York, U.S.)	Valerie West	22	Wilkes-Barre	Top 10 at Miss World Philippines 2026; Won Miss Global Philippines 2026
Iligan	Juliana Fresado	19	Iligan	Won Mutya ng Pilipinas Mindanao 2025
Ilocos Sur (Washington, U.S.)	Jeanne Nicole Lipa	23	Quezon City	
Iloilo (England)	Angeline Kailani	27	London	
Iloilo City	Karen Piccio	26	Maasin	Won Miss Philippines Eco Tourism 2019
Isabela	Jarina Sandhu	21	Cauayan	Top 12 at Binibining Pilipinas 2026
Kalibo	MJ Fernandez	18	Numancia	
Laguna	Eloisa Jauod	24	San Pedro, Laguna	Competed at Miss Millenial Philippines 2019
Lapu-Lapu City	Natasha Testa	20	Lapu-Lapu	
Las Piñas (Western Canada)	Kristel David	20	Vancouver	
Leyte (Florida, U.S.)	Victoria Johnson	22	Brandon	Runner-up at Miss Philippines Earth 2024
Liliw (New Jersey, U.S.)	Pauline del Mundo	32	Hillsborough	
Los Baños	Rendelle Caraig	24	Los Baños	Competed at Binibining Pilipinas 2024
Lucena (Sydney)	Bella Dela Cruz	25	Sydney	Won Miss International Australia 2025
Malay (Southern California)	Taylor DeLuna	22	St. Louis	
Manila	Jasmine Paguio	25	Manila	Runner-Up at Miss Philippines Earth 2022
Muntinlupa	Winwyn Marquez	32	Muntinlupa	Top 15 at Binibining Pilipinas 2015; Won Reina Hispanoamericana 2017
Naga, Camarines Sur (Virginia)	Zoe Gabon	24	Naga	Top 15 at Miss World Philippines 2026
Naic	Kaye Pastelero	23	Naic	Competed at Binibining Pilipinas 2026
Negros Occidental	Franches Laquibla	20	Pontevedra	
Nueva Ecija (Melbourne, Australia)	Chanel Thomas	33	Melbourne	Won Binibining Pilipinas Supranational 2017; Top 10 finalist at Miss Supranational 2017; Won Miss Philippines Earth 2015 Air
Occidental Mindoro	Ain Niqyla Abad	18	San Jose	Competed at Binibining Pilipinas 2026
Oriental Mindoro	Rechel Hoco	23	Bongabong	
Ozamiz	Irish Sescon	26	Ozamiz	
Pampanga	Rhancoise Mayangitan	29	Candaba	Competed at Mutya ng Pilipinas 2016
Pangasinan	Andrea Cayabyab	20	San Fabian	
Parañaque	Jenny Kim Agasid	20	Parañaque	Competed at Mutya Pilipinas 2019
Pasay (Pennsylvania)	Amanda Russo	20	Avondale	Won Miss Young Philippines USA 2019
Pasig	Alessandra Eugenio	19	Pasig	
Quezon	Ahtisa Manalo	27	Candelaria	Won Binibining Pilipinas International 2018; First Runner-Up at Miss International 2018; Top 10 at Miss Cosmo 2024
Quezon City	Zoe Honeyman	23	Quezon City	
Quirino	Bianca Ylanan	25	Maddela	
Romblon	Mariah Valdez	25	Alcantara	
Samar Island	Kathreen Dacanay	20	Borongan	
San Fernando, Cebu	Thelma Dayao	19	San Fernando	
San Jose, Batangas (Eastern Canada)	Jessica Cianchino	25	Markham	Competed at Miss Earth 2022, representing Canada; Second Runner-Up at Miss Asia Pacific International 2019 representing Canada
Siargao	Millien Cabigas	24	Tandag	
Siniloan	Yllana Aduana	26	Siniloan	Top 12 at Binibining Pilipinas 2022; Won Miss Philippines Earth 2023; Won Miss Earth — Air at Miss Earth 2023
Sultan Kudarat	Chelsea Fernandez	25	Tacurong	Won Binibining Pilipinas Globe 2022; Top 15 at Miss Globe 2022; Won Miss Philippines Earth 2019 Water
Tacloban	Angela Hermosa Cabel	25	Tacloban	
Taguig	Katrina Llegado	27	Taguig	Won Miss Reina Hispanoamericana Philippines 2019; Fifth Runner-Up at Reina Hispanoamericana 2019; Second Runner-Up at Miss Universe Philippines 2022
Tandag	Dañelle Catalan	25	Tandag	
Tarlac	Sasha Lacuna	20	Tarlac City	Won Binibining Pilipinas Globe 2026
Tuguegarao	Thea Lacanlalay	18	Tuguegarao	
