= Binibining Pilipinas 2026 =

Filipino beauty pageant

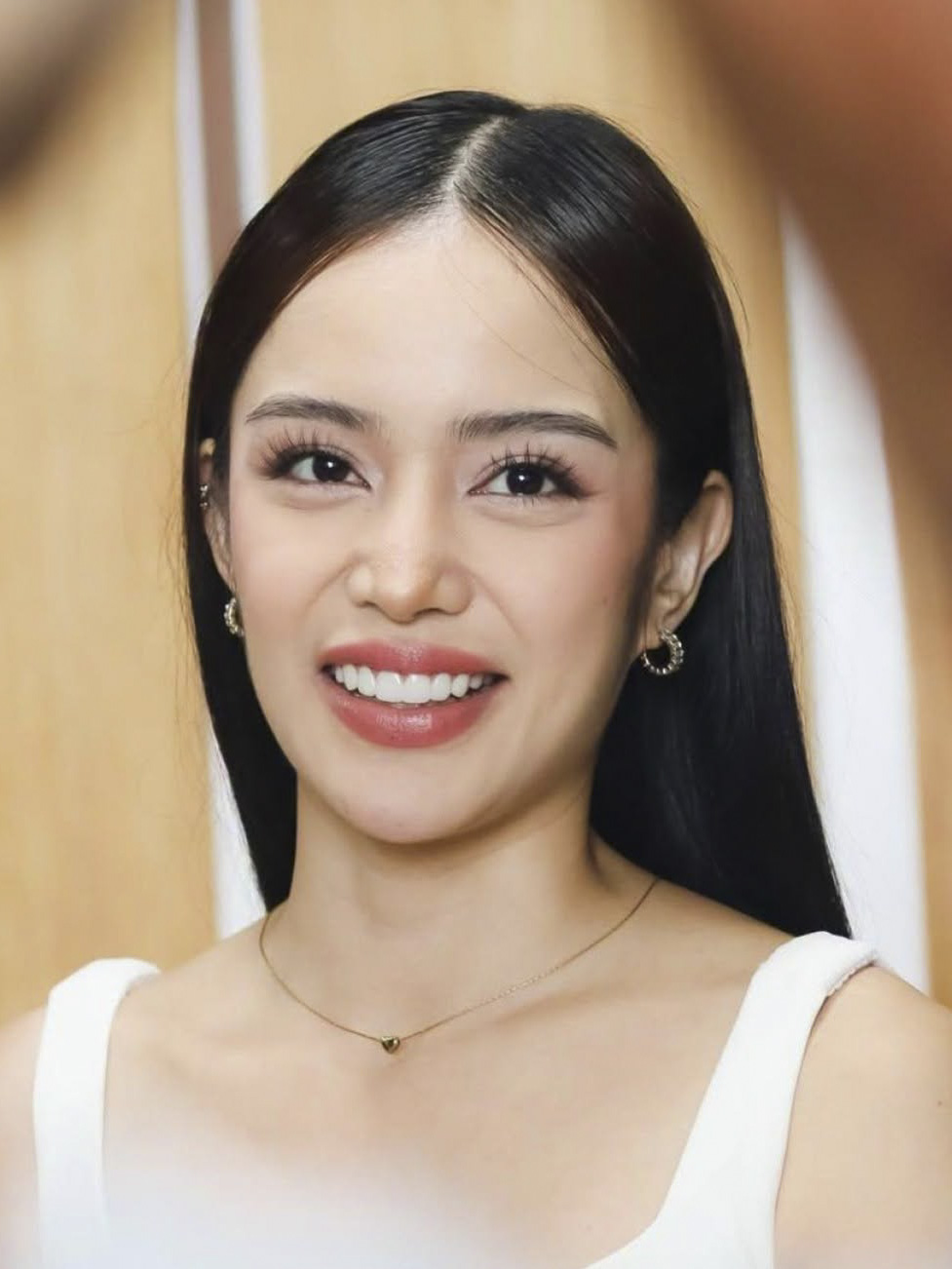
- Gwendoline Soriano
- Date: July 18, 2026
- Hosts: Nicole Cordoves; Catriona Gray; Mary Jean Lastimosa; Miriam Quiambao
- Entertainment: Alamat; Kyle Echarri; Jericho Rosales
- Venue: Araneta Coliseum, Quezon City
- Broadcaster: YouTube; Facebook Live; TikTok
- Entrants: 35
- Withdrawals: Makati; Misamis Oriental
- Winner: Gwendoline Soriano; Baguio
- Congeniality: Georgette Nicole Coronacion; Carmona
- Best National Costume: Mylene Manschus Tanza; Ain Niqyla Abad San Jose, Occidental Mindoro; Samantha Marie Zabarte Dasmariñas; Iris Oresca Bicol Region; Patricia Lynn Beerda Iloilo
- Photogenic: Zilanni Eve Rojas; Zamboanga City

Binibining Pilipinas 2026 was the 62nd Binibining Pilipinas pageant, held on July 18, 2026, at the Araneta Coliseum in Quezon City. The competition was presented by former winners Nicole Cordoves, Catriona Gray, Mary Jean Lastimosa, and Miriam Quiambao and featured performances from boy band Alamat and singers Kyle Echarri and Jericho Rosales.

Katrina Johnson of Davao and Annabelle Mae McDonnell of Iligan crowned Gwendoline Soriano of Baguio and Sasha Lacuna of Tarlac as their successors as national titleholders for the Miss International and the Miss Globe pageants, respectively. They will represent the Philippines at their respective competitions. Julianne Raine Antonio of Dumaguete was named first runner-up, while Tracy Mae Sunio of Bacolod was named second runner-up.

== Overview ==
=== Location ===
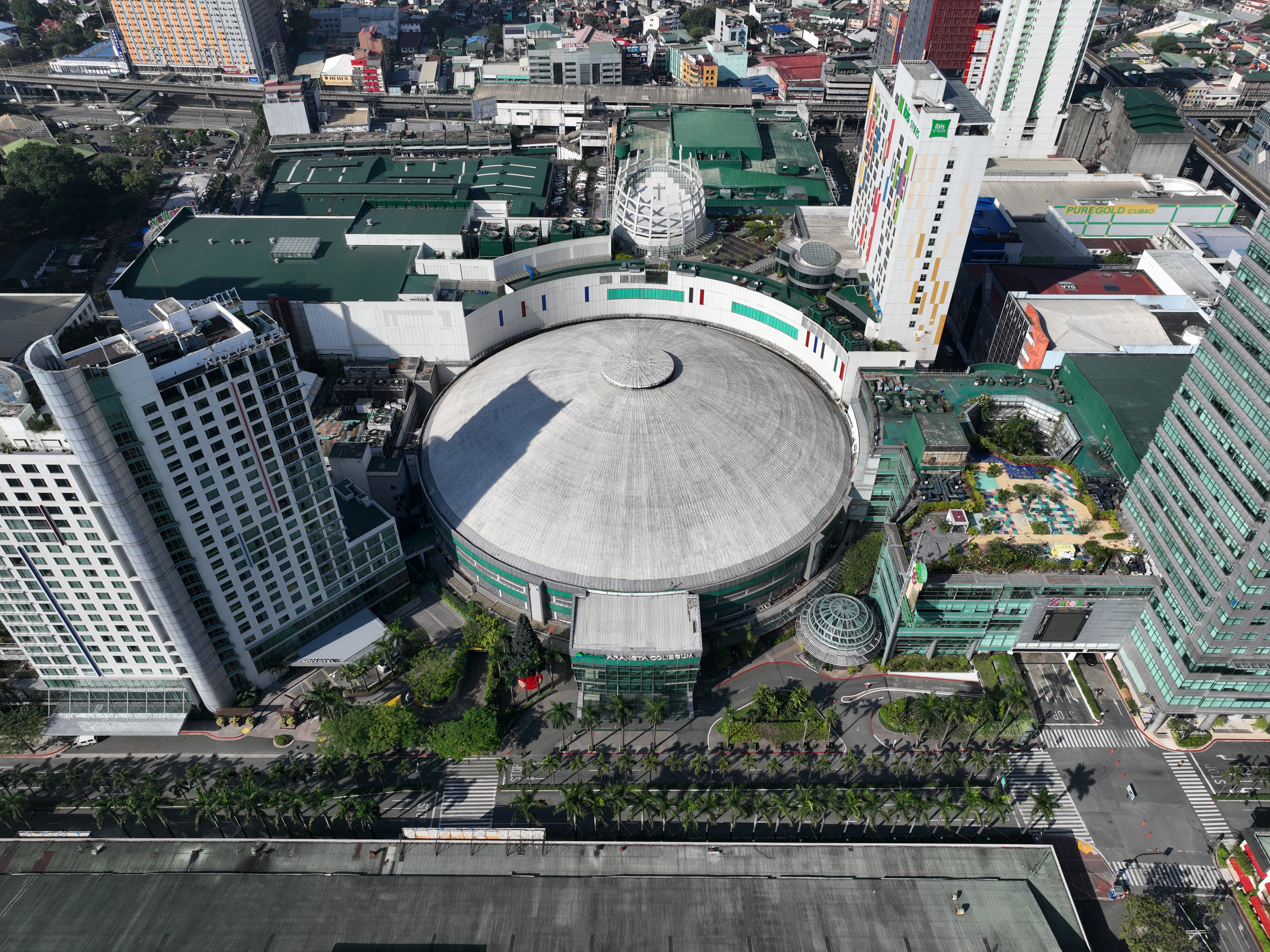
The Araneta Coliseum in Quezon City (pictured in 2026), the venue of the pageant.

On May 29, 2026, the organizers scheduled the coronation night for July 18. As with previous editions, the pageant was held at the Araneta Coliseum in Quezon City. Venues in the wider Araneta City district also hosted a number of major events for the competition, with the preliminary and national costume competition being held at the district's branch of Novotel and the New Frontier Theater, respectively.

=== Selection of participants ===
On February 25, 2026, Binibining Pilipinas announced its renewal of the franchises for the Miss International and the Miss Globe pageants for another three years. At the same time, the pageant opened its applications for aspiring candidates for 2026 edition, which ran through March 14. The applicants underwent a final screening on March 23, with the final roster of 36 delegates announced the following day.

==== Withdrawals and replacement ====
From the initial 36 contestants, two withdrew before the competition: Nicole Sobria of Makati and Ivy Padilla of Misamis Oriental. Only the former was replaced, with Genesis Durana of Caloocan taking over Sobria's slot.

== Results ==
=== Placements ===
Map of the participating localities and the placements of their respective delegates. Color key Winners 1st Runner-Up 2nd Runner-Up Top 12 Unplaced No delegate

Legend

- National titleholder placed in the international pageant
- National titleholder has yet to compete in the international pageant

Placement	Contestant	International Placement
Binibining Pilipinas International 2026	Bb. #12 Baguio – Gwendoline Soriano	TBD – Miss International 2027
Binibining Pilipinas Globe 2026	Bb. #13 Tarlac – Sasha Lacuna	Top 11 – The Miss Globe 2026
1st Runner-Up	Bb. #29 Dumaguete – Julianne Raine Antonio	No competition
2nd Runner-Up	Bb. #19 Bacolod – Tracy Mae Sunio	No competition
Top 12	Bb. #2 Cagayan de Oro – Gwyneth Jemimah Chan; Bb. #7 Tanza – Mylene Manschus; Bb. #16 Oriental Mindoro – Angelica Arwin Evora; Bb. #18 Pampanga – Anne Klein Castro (Note: Automatically advanced to the Top 12 as the winner of the Nustar Online Binibini award); Bb. #25 Cauayan, Isabela – Jarina Sandhu; Bb. #31 Iloilo – Patricia Lynn Beerda; Bb. #32 Aklan – Pauline Thea Ann Ibuyan; Bb. #33 La Union – Anjali Pradeep Kumar	No competition

=== Special awards ===
Award	Contestant
Best in Evening Gown	Bb. #12 Baguio – Gwendoline Soriano
Best in Swimsuit	Bb. #12 Baguio – Gwendoline Soriano
Bb. Friendship	Bb. #23 Carmona, Cavite – Georgette Nicole Coronacion
Bb. Philippine Airlines	Bb. #12 Baguio – Gwendoline Soriano
Bb. Tourism (Best Tourism Video)	Bb. #32 Aklan – Pauline Thea Ann Ibuyan
Bb. The Med Club	Bb. #25 Cauayan, Isabela – Jarina Sandhu
Bb. Urban Smiles	Bb. #12 Baguio – Gwendoline Soriano
Face of Binibini	Bb. #5 Zamboanga City – Zilanni Eve Rojas
Manila Bulletin Readers' Choice	Bb. #20 Dasmariñas – Samantha Marie Zabarte
Miss SnowCaps Radiance	Bb. #12 Baguio – Gwendoline Soriano
Nustar Online Binibini	Bb. #18 Pampanga – Anne Klein Castro

== Pageant ==
=== Format ===
The results of the evening gown and swimsuit segments―together with the preliminary competition, determined the first 11 semifinalists, which was joined by an additional delegate chosen through an online poll, creating a total of 12 finalists advancing to the next round. The semifinalists then faced the first round of the question-and-answer segment to narrow the field to four finalists. For the first time in the pageant's history, the four finalists then faced the second round of the segment to respond to a common question, which determined the winners of both titles and their runners-up.

=== Selection committee ===
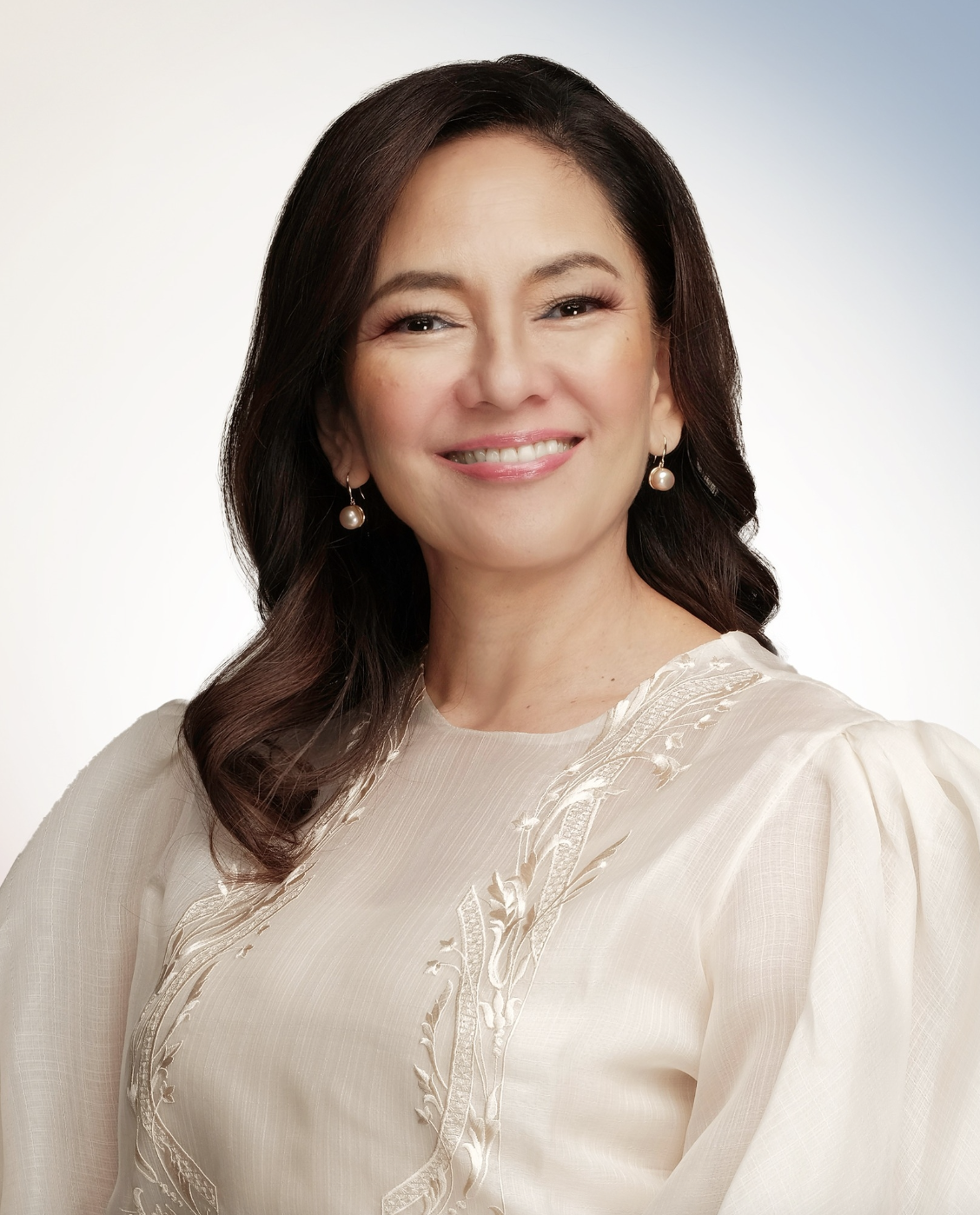
Risa Hontiveros, a senator of the Philippines, led the committee as the chairperson.

The members of the selection committee evaluated the 35 contestants to determine the delegates of the Philippines to Miss International and the Miss Globe. During the finals, Senator Risa Hontiveros served as the chairperson of the panel.

==== Finals ====
- Oliver Buenviaje – chef
- Paul Cabral – fashion designer
- Gloria Diaz – actress and Miss Universe 1969
- Catalina Duque – Miss International 2025
- Janine Gutierrez – actress
- Risa Hontiveros – senator of the Philippines
- Erika Lipton – fashion designer and wife of ambassador of the United States to the Philippines Lee Lipton
- Precious Lara Quigaman – actress and Miss International 2005
- Jose Manuel Romualdez – ambassador of the Philippines to the United States
- Chayathanus Saradatta – The Miss Globe 2025
- Scottie Thompson – professional basketball player

==== Preliminary competition ====
- Eric Amigo
- Victoria Araneta-Fores
- Alex Barcelo
- Badette Cunanan
- Ralph delas Alas
- Vida Doria – Binibining Pilipinas Universe 1971
- Marjorie Go
- Fortune Ledesma – first runner-up at Binibining Pilipinas 1968
- Pia Roxas Ojeda
- Maria Anna Perez
- Bea Santiago – Miss International 2013

=== Broadcast ===
The pageant was broadcast live on YouTube, Facebook Live, and TikTok, and was sponsored by gambling platform Nustar Online. The finale was presented by former winners Nicole Cordoves, Catriona Gray, Mary Jean Lastimosa, and Miriam Quiambao. The event featured performances from boy band Alamat and singers Kyle Echarri and Jericho Rosales.

Guests noted by the organizers leading up to the competition include Catalina Duque and Chayathanus Saradatta, the reigning titleholders of Miss International and the Miss Globe, respectively, whom were later introduced as members of the selection committee on coronation night. The final telecast featured the companion show Sisters of the Crown, which was presented by former winners Bea Santiago and Jasmin Bungay and featured interviews with select alumnae.

== Pre-pageant events ==
=== National Costume Competition ===
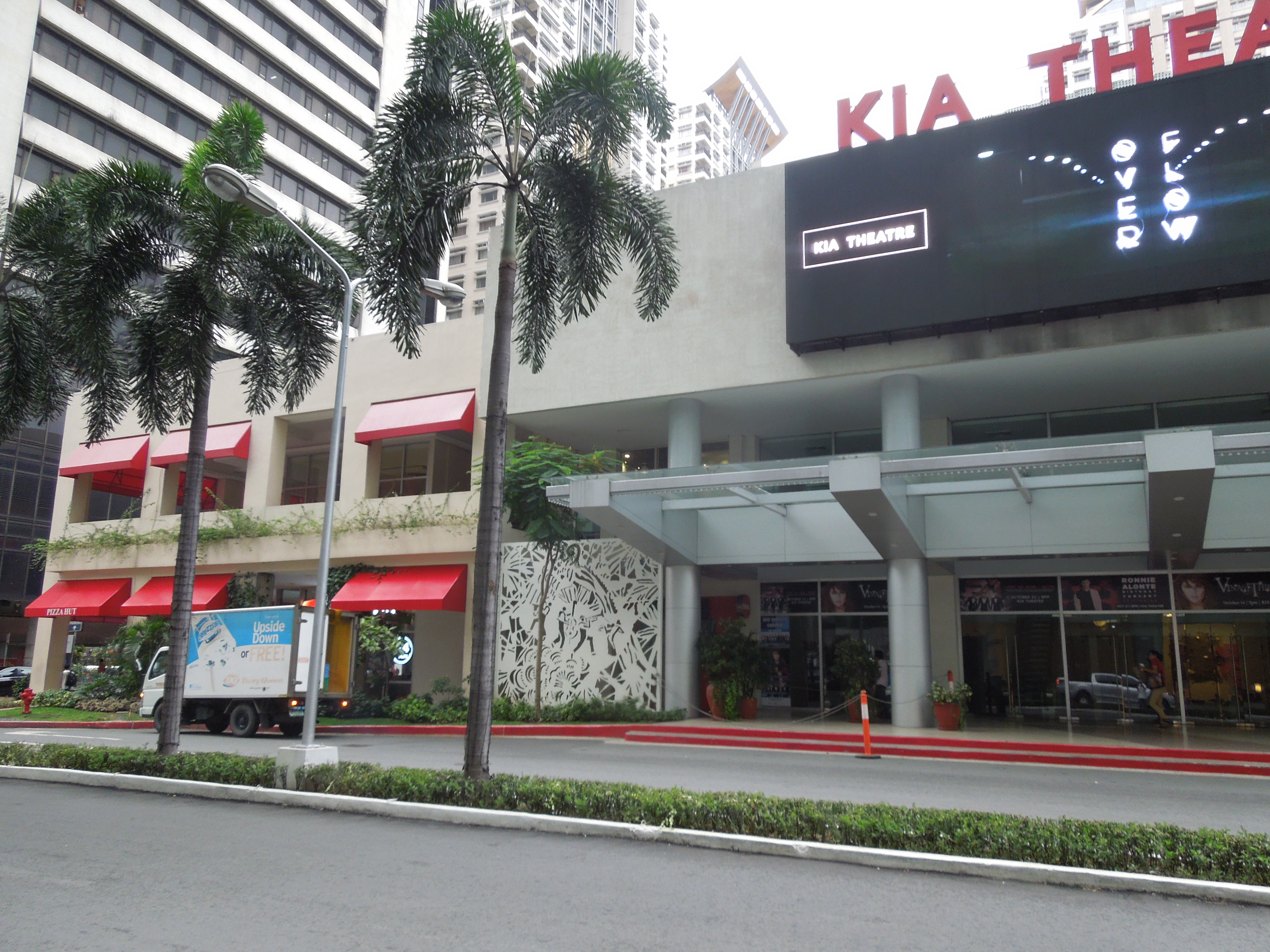
The New Frontier Theater in Quezon City (pictured in 2026), the venue of the competition.

The national costume competition was held on July 2 to select ten finalists for the "Best National Costume" award. The candidates shortlisted from the competition faced the public vote to determine the five winners of the competition. Online voting ran from July 3 to 9, via Facebook, with the results announced during the coronation night.

This year's entries were themed after endangered species endemic to the localities represented by the contestants. The event was organized as a fundraiser in response to the 2026 Mindanao earthquake that occurred the preceding month, with proceeds being turned over to the Philippine Red Cross to aid in relief and rehabilitation efforts in the area. Girl group Kaia performed in the event.

Placement	Contestant	Designer
Best in National Costume	Bb. #7 Tanza – Mylene Manschus	Karl Balao, Arleigh Ron
Best in National Costume	Bb. #17 San Jose, Occidental Mindoro – Ain Niqyla Abad	Michael Dela Cruz
Best in National Costume	Bb. #20 Dasmariñas – Samantha Marie Zabarte	Janela Alcoran
Best in National Costume	Bb. #22 Bicol Region – Iris Oresca	Jeric Sayno
Best in National Costume	Bb. #31 Iloilo – Patricia Lynn Beerda	Al Manases Alcoran
Top 10	Bb. #1 Caluya – Britney Angel Rubino	Tata Blas Pinuela
Top 10	Bb. #13 Tarlac – Sasha Lacuna	Simeon Cayetano
Top 10	Bb. #18 Pampanga – Anne Klein Castro	Deonard Mabeza
Top 10	Bb. #30 Cavite – Kaye Pastelero	Norgine Rambaud
Top 10	Bb. #32 Aklan – Pauline Thea Ann Ibuyan	Louis Pangilinan

=== Non-competition events ===
The delegates participated in a number of events as part of the pageant, including charity events and fashion shows. The inaugural Binibining Pilipinas Gala was held in conjunction with the preliminary competition, which saw Gloria Diaz, the winner of Miss Universe 1969, awarded the first "Sisterhood Hall of Fame" award.

== Contestants ==
A total of 35 contestants competed for the two titles.

No.	Locality	Contestant	Age (Note: Ages at the time of the competition)	Notes
1	Caluya	Britney Angel Rubino	21	
2	Cagayan de Oro	Gwyneth Jemimah Chan	22	
3	Caloocan	Genesis Durana	28	
4	General Trias	Trisha Irish Marie Rosales	20	
5	Zamboanga City	Zilanni Eve Rojas	22	
6	Malabon	Mary Adeline Ramirez	27	
7	Tanza	Mylene Manschus	25	
8	Negros Occidental	Elli Rose Elola	25	
9	Occidental Mindoro	Arah Josmin Reguyal	28	
10	Ilocos Norte	Joahnna Lee Ucol	26	Competed at Miss Philippines Earth 2025
11	Jaen, Nueva Ecija	Maria Kathrina Pauline Cudia	23	
12	Baguio	Gwendoline Soriano	27	Withdrew from Binibining Pilipinas 2022; Top 12 at Miss Universe Philippines 2025
13	Tarlac	Sasha Lacuna	22	Top 24 at Miss Universe Philippines 2025
14	Palawan	Shara Maxine Barber	26	
15	Ilocos Sur	Julie Mae Villanueva	25	
16	Oriental Mindoro	Angelica Arwin Evora	26	
17	San Jose, Occidental Mindoro	Ain Niqyla Abad	19	Top 24 at Miss Universe Philippines 2025
18	Pampanga	Anne Klein Castro	21	Winner of Mutya ng Pilipinas-World Top Model 2024
19	Bacolod	Tracy Mae Sunio	25	Top 15 semi-finalist at Binibining Pilipinas 2024
20	Dasmariñas	Samantha Marie Zabarte	23	
21	Cavite City	Alisa Keith Irugin	25	Competed at Miss Pearl of the Orient Philippines 2025
22	Bicol Region	Iris Oresca	24	
23	Carmona, Cavite	Georgette Nicole Coronacion	27	
24	Bulacan	Kristeen Mia Lucero	25	
25	Cauayan, Isabela	Jarina Sandhu	22	Top 24 at Miss Universe Philippines 2025
26	Bais, Negros Oriental	Nathalie Magat	26	
27	Quezon City	Marinella Catangay	28	Competed at Miss Grand Philippines 2023
28	Malolos	Camille Bernadette Martin	22	
29	Dumaguete	Julianne Raine Antonio	24	
30	Cavite	Kaye Pastelero	25	Competed at Miss Universe Philippines 2025
31	Iloilo	Patricia Lynn Beerda	25	1st Runner-Up at Miss Teen Philippines 2019
32	Aklan	Pauline Thea Ann Ibuyan	26	
33	La Union	Anjali Pradeep Kumar	24	Winner of Miss Hotel and Restaurants Association of Baguio 2025
34	Pangasinan	Stacey de Ocampo	27	Winner of Mutya ng Pilipinas Visayas 2024
35	Cebu	Christine Jorelle Usaraga	27	Competed at Hiyas ng Pilipinas 2024
