= Miss International 2025 =

63rd Miss International pageant

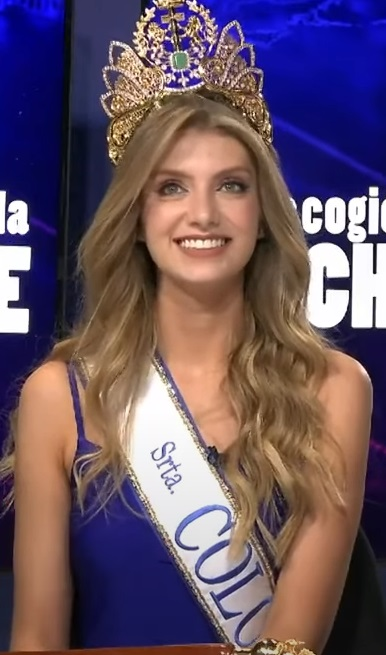
- Catalina Duque
- Date: 27 November 2025
- Presenters: Andrea Rubio; Maxwell Powers; Tomomi Okada
- Entertainment: Michael Bodin
- Venue: Yoyogi National Gymnasium, Shibuya, Tokyo, Japan
- Broadcaster: YouTube
- Entrants: 80
- Placements: 20
- Debuts: Montenegro; Réunion; Turks and Caicos Islands
- Withdrawals: Bulgaria; Cape Verde; Ireland; Kyrgyzstan; Laos; Luxembourg; Moldova; Panama; Sierra Leone; South Sudan
- Returns: Angola; Cook Islands; Denmark; Greece; Jamaica; Kenya; Malta; Mauritius; Namibia; Norway; Pakistan; Russia; Tanzania; Tunisia; Turkey; United States Virgin Islands; Zimbabwe
- Winner: Catalina Duque; Colombia
- Best National Costume: Portia Akua Mensah (Ghana)
- Photogenic: Ekaterina Romanova (Russia)

Miss International 2025 was the 63rd edition of the Miss International pageant, held on 27 November 2025 in Yoyogi National Gymnasium in Shibuya, Tokyo, Japan.

At the end of the event, Thanh Thủy Huỳnh of Vietnam crowned Catalina Duque of Colombia as her successor at the conclusion of the event, it is the country's first victory after 21 years, and it's overall fourth victory in the pageant.

Eighty contestants from countries and territories participated in this year.

== Background ==
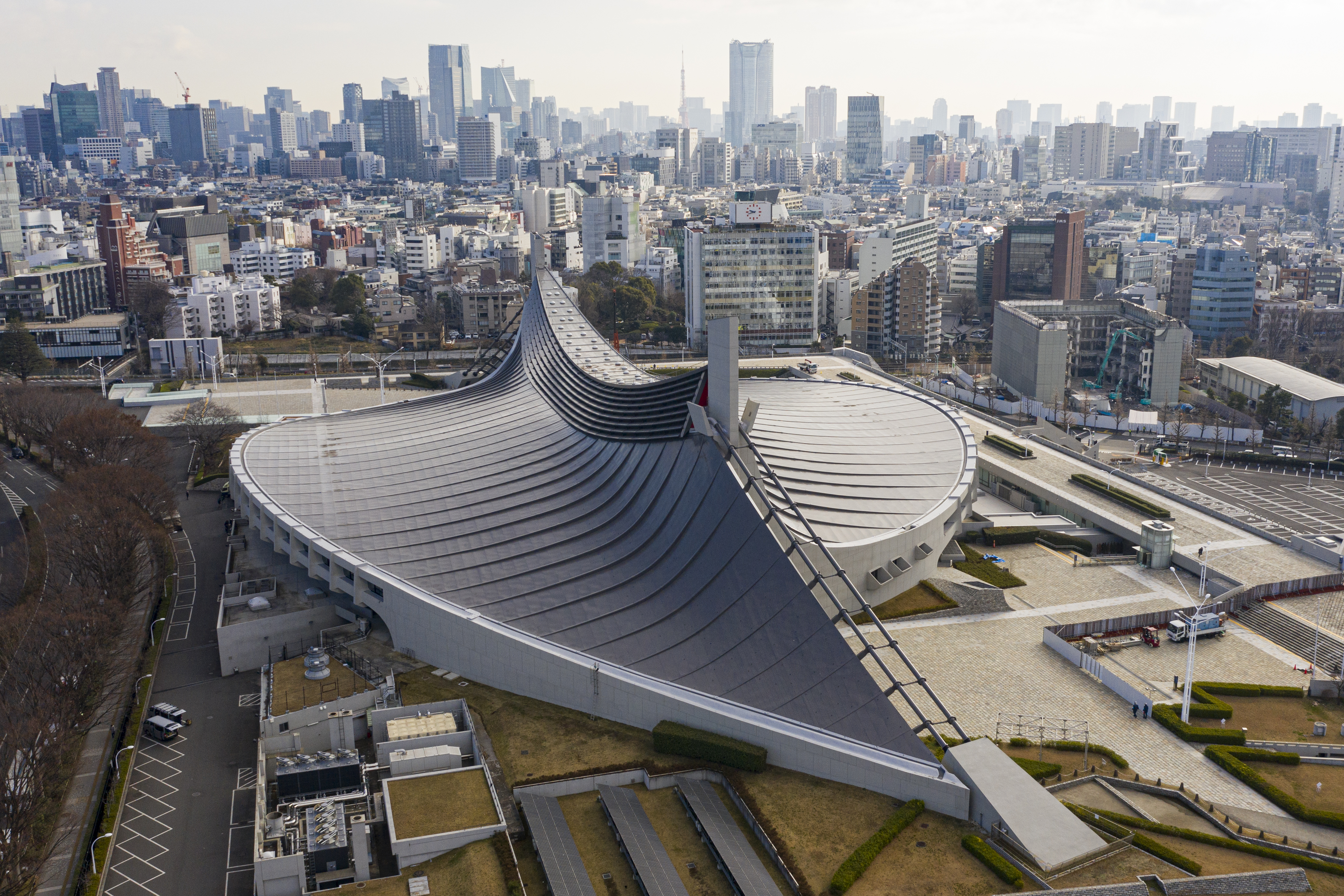
Yoyogi National Gymnasium, the venue of Miss International 2025

=== Location and date ===
The Miss International Organization announced on 24 March 2025 that the pageant will take place in Tokyo, Japan where the winner will be crowned on 27 November 2025. The contest held in the Yoyogi National Stadium's Second Gymnasium in Shibuya, Tokyo, as was Miss International 2023.

=== Selection of participants ===
==== Replacements ====
Miss International Tunisia, Lamis Redissi was to compete, but was replaced by Nourane Khammari, after her organization sent her to Miss World 2025. Khammari was then replaced by Oumaima Moussa for undisclosed reasons.

Miss Hong Kong International Winnie Chan relinquished her title for personal reasons, and was replaced by Alicia Mui.

==== Debuts, returns and withdrawals ====
This edition marked the debuts of Montenegro, Réunion, and Turks and Caicos Islands and the returns of Malta which last competed in 2003, Tanzania in 2011; the United States Virgin Islands in 2012; Turkey in 2015; the Cook Islands in 2018; Russia in 2019; Kenya and Namibia in 2022; and Angola, Denmark, Greece, Jamaica, Mauritius, Norway, Pakistan, Tunisia and Zimbabwe in 2023.

Miss International Kyrgyzstan 2025, Suzanna Umetova was replaced by Miss Kyrgyzstan 2025, Ayana Rasul by the Miss Kyrgyzstan organization for unknown reasons. Rasul also withdrew from the competition. Lara Doval of Germany also withdrew.

== Results ==
=== Placements ===
Placement	Contestant
Miss International 2025	Colombia – Catalina Duque
1st Runner-Up	Zimbabwe – Yollanda Chimbarami
2nd Runner-Up	Bolivia – Paola Guzmán
3rd Runner-Up	Indonesia – Melliza Xaviera
4th Runner-Up	Philippines – Myrna Esguerra
Top 10	Canada – Rachel Murgel; Dominican Republic – Anita Maspons; Myanmar – Nan Inzali ★ ‡; Nicaragua – Verónica Iglesias; Sri Lanka – Sheneli Romaya
Top 20	Angola – Lauriela Martins; India – Roosh Sindhu; Jamaica – Shanté Jarrett; Japan – Ai Nozaki; Mexico – Natalia Garibay; Netherlands – Serena Darder; Peru – Nathie Quijano; South Africa – Sinamile Dlamini ★; Thailand – Jarupiya Boribalburibhand; United States – Nicky Kandola ★

‡ – Voted into the Top 10 by the viewers
★ – Voted into the Top 20 by the viewers

==== Continental Queens ====
Award	Contestant
Miss International Africa	Zimbabwe – Yollanda Chimbarami
Miss International Americas	Turks and Caicos Islands – Farrah Grant
Miss International Asia Pacific	Macau – Katrina Wan
Miss International Europe	United Kingdom – Sophie Wallace

==== Special awards ====
Award	Contestants
Best in Evening Gown	Bangladesh – Jessia Islam
Best in Talent	Cook Islands – Zoe Hoff
Miss Elegance	Czech Republic – Simona Procházková
Miss Fitness	Dominican Republic – Anita Maspons
Miss Friendship	Japan – Ai Nozaki
Miss Photogenic	Russia – Ekaterina Romanova
Miss Sustainable Beauty	Kenya – Fridah Kariuki
People's Choice Award	Myanmar – Nan Inzali
Miss Visit Japan	Brasil – Loraine Lumatelli

==== Best in National Costume ====
Placement	Contestant	Ref.
Winner	Ghana – Portia Akua Mensah	
1st Runner-Up	Vietnam – Kiều Duy Nguyễn	
2nd Runner-Up	Tanzania – Efrazia Makene	

== Pageant ==
Venezuelan model and Miss International 2023, Andrea Rubio, Miss International Japan 2019, Tomomi Okada, and American voice actor, Maxwell Powers served as the presenters.

=== Format ===
Just like the previous edition, the number of semifinalists maintained to twenty – seventeen of which were chosen through the preliminary competition, while three were chosen through internet voting. The twenty semi-finalists competed in the swimsuit and evening gown competition. Afterwards, the competition introduced a new stage in which the top ten semifinalists each presented their chosen Sustainable Development Goal (SDG). From ten, five semifinalists were advanced to compete in the question and answer round.

=== Selection committee ===
- Akemi Shimomura – President of the Miss International Organization
- Hiroshi Tabata – Former commissioner of Japan Tourism Agency
- Junko Koshino – Japanese fashion designer
- Oğuzhan Ertuğrul – Turkish ambassador extraordinary and plenipotentiary of Turkey to Japan
- Ryohei Miyata – Chairman of the Public Interest Incorporated Association, Nitten
- Senko Ikenobo – Japanese headmaster designate at Ikenobō
- Soujitsu Kobori – Head of Kobori Enshu school of tea
- Supapan Pichaironarongsongkram – Thai chairwoman of Chao Phraya Express Boat
- Thanh Thủy Huỳnh – Miss International 2024 from Vietnam
- Teodolinda Rosa Rodrigues Coelho – Angolan ambassador extraordinary and plenipotentiary of Angola to Japan

== Contestants ==
80 contestants competed for the title.

Country/Territory	Contestant	Age (Note: Ages during the competition)	Hometown
Albania	Gledia Preka	25	Lezhë
Angola	Lauriela Martins	27	Cabinda
Argentina	Daiana Pereyra	27	Posadas
Australia	Bella Dela Cruz	25	Sydney
Bangladesh	Jessia Islam	26	Dhaka
Belgium	Elizabeth Raska	27	Brussels
Bolivia	Paola Guzmán	22	Cochabamba
Brazil	Loraine Lumatelli	24	Rosário do Sul
Cambodia	Pichvoleak So	24	Kampot
Canada	Rachel Murgel	24	Belleville
Chile	Nallely Bobadilla	24	Talca
China	Le Wei He	21	Shanghai
Colombia	Catalina Duque	26	Medellín
Cook Islands	Zoe Hoff	24	Avarua
Costa Rica	Shakira Graham	23	Siquirres
Cuba	Rosangela Rizo	27	Havana
Czech Republic	Simona Procházková	25	Znojmo
Denmark	Asta Nielsen	23	Herlev
Dominican Republic	Anita Maspons	22	Santo Domingo
Ecuador	Eunice Rivadeneira	25	Guayaquil
El Salvador	Alva Echegoyen	24	Santa Tecla
Ethiopia	Felicity Feleke	22	Addis Ababa
Finland	Vera Eloranta	22	Tampere
France	Laura Hérault	24	Martinique
Ghana	Portia Akua Mensah	21	Tema
Greece	Daniela Palousi	24	Piraeus
Guatemala	Hilda Gutiérrez	21	Chiquimula
Hawaii	Maya Kāneali'i	18	Hilo
Honduras	Irma Handal	21	Siguatepeque
Hong Kong	Alicia Mui	22	Hong Kong
India	Roosh Sindhu	26	Nagpur
Indonesia	Melliza Xaviera	26	Jakarta
Italy	Egle Fruttauro	19	Naples
Jamaica	Shanté Jarrett	24	Montego Bay
Japan	Ai Nozaki	23	Yamanashi
Kenya	Fridah Kariuki	28	Kiambere
Liberia	Precious Lemu Flomo	23	Bong County
Macau	Katrina Wan	26	Macau
Malaysia	Allyson Ee	25	Johor
Malta	Demi Mock	22	Għargħur
Mauritius	Naarmeen Bernon	24	Port Louis
Mexico	Natalia Garibay	25	Puerto Vallarta
Mongolia	Bayarchimeg Tsegmid	22	Ulaanbaatar
Montenegro	Ana Dedvukaj	20	Tuzi
Myanmar	Nan Inzali	24	Hakha
Namibia	Uatjiri Mbaisa	27	Otjinene
Nepal	Urusha Bhandari	26	Sudurpashchim
Netherlands	Serena Darder	25	Badhoevedorp
New Zealand	Britney Pringle	25	Auckland
Nicaragua	Verónica Iglesias	24	Granada
Nigeria	Faith Ekwebenam	28	Anambra
Norway	Nikoline Andresen	22	Fredrikstad
Pakistan	Mia Sadique	20	Jhelum
Paraguay	Ayhelen Ríos	20	Encarnación
Peru	Nathie Quijano	22	Lima
Philippines	Myrna Esguerra	24	Pidigan
Poland	Maja Todd	20	Katowice
Portugal	Sofia Mota Jorge	24	Porto
Puerto Rico	Zamira Allende	26	Cataño
Réunion	Manon Kbidi	24	Saint-Joseph
Romania	Georgiana Popescu	27	Bucharest
Russia	Ekaterina Romanova	23	Saint Petersburg
Singapore	Tanisha Tan	26	Singapore
South Africa	Sinamile Dlamini	25	Johannesburg
South Korea	Jihoo Kim	28	Seoul
Spain	Idayra Tena	22	Puerto de la Cruz
Sri Lanka	Sheneli Romaya	18	Ja-Ela
Taiwan	Yihan Chiu	18	Taoyuan
Tanzania	Efrazia Makene	23	Dar es Salaam
Thailand	Jarupiya Boribalburibhand	25	Bangkok
Tunisia	Oumaima Moussa	24	M'saken
Turkey	Sena Şeref	25	Ankara
Turks and Caicos Islands	Farrah Grant	27	North Caicos
Ukraine	Anna Lutsenko	22	Uman
United Kingdom	Sophie Wallace	27	Falkirk
United States	Nicky Kandola	27	Washington, D.C.
United States Virgin Islands	Sikeza Fowlks	27	Charlotte Amalie
Venezuela	Alessandra Guillén	27	Caracas
Vietnam	Kiều Duy Nguyễn	21	Vĩnh Long
Zimbabwe	Yollanda Chimbarami	26	Mashonaland Central
