= Allyson Ee =

Filipino-Malaysian chemical engineer, scientist, and beauty pageant titleholder

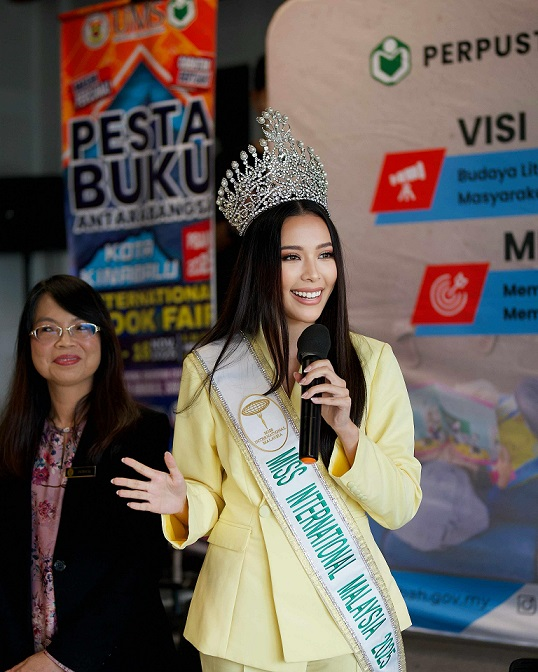
- Ee in 2025
- Born: Allyson Mei Ee; November 24, 1999 (age 26); Caloocan, Philippines
- Education: University of California Santa Barbara (BS); Palos Verdes Peninsula High School; Philippine Science High School
- Height: 170 cm (67 in)
- Beauty pageant titleholder
- Title: Miss International Malaysia 2025
- Major competitions: Miss Universe Philippines 2025 (Unplaced) (Best National Costume); Miss International Malaysia 2025 (Winner) (Miss International Peninsular) (Best in Body Beautiful) (Best in Heritage Kebaya); Miss International 2025 (Unplaced)

Allyson Mei Ee is a Filipino-Malaysian chemical engineer, scientist, and beauty pageant titleholder who was crowned Miss International Malaysia 2025. Ee represented Malaysia at the Miss International 2025 competition.

Ee previously competed in Miss Universe Philippines 2025 after being appointed as Northern California's representative.

== Early life ==
Ee was born in Caloocan, Philippines. She attended the Philippine Science High School from 2014 to 2016. At age 16, she moved to the United States where she entered the Palos Verdes Peninsula High School. She then later pursued her Bachelor of Science degree in Chemical Engineering from the University of California Santa Barbara.

Ee is a chemical engineer based in Silicon Valley. She took part in developing a cutting-edge battery engineering technology for a company in Silicon Valley.

== Pageantry ==
=== Miss Universe Philippines 2025 ===
On January 5, 2025, Ee was introduced as Miss Philippines Northern California by The Miss Philippines West Cost, an accredited partner of the Miss Universe Philippines. She then competed at the Miss Universe Philippines 2025 competition representing both Caloocan and the Filipino Society of Northern California where she was unplaced.

Shortly after the coronation night, Ee was awarded as the winner of the national costume competition.

=== Miss International Malaysia 2025 ===
Ee competed at the Miss International Malaysia 2025 competition representing Johor where she won.

=== Miss International 2025 ===
As Miss International Malaysia 2025, Ee represented Malaysia at the Miss International 2025 competition where she was unplaced.
