= Bella Dela Cruz =

Filipino-Australian economist and beauty pageant titleholder

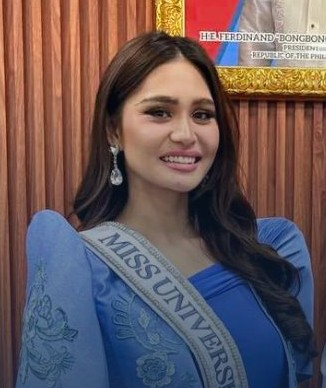
- Dela Cruz in 2025
- Born: Renee Isabella Dela Cruz; July 13, 2000 (age 26)
- Education: University of New South Wales
- Beauty pageant titleholder
- Title: Miss International Australia 2025
- Major competitions: Miss Universe Philippines 2025 (Top 24); Queens of Australia 2025 (Winner – Miss International Australia 2025); Miss International 2025 (Unplaced)

Renee Isabella "Bella" Dela Cruz is a Filipino-Australian economist and beauty pageant titleholder who was crowned Miss International Australia 2025. She represented Australia at Miss International 2025.

== Early life ==
Dela Cruz was born on July 13, 2000. She completed her degree in Commerce and Economics from the University of New South Wales.

== Pageantry ==
=== Miss Philippines Australia 2023 ===
Dela Cruz competed at the Miss Philippines Australia 2023 pageant where she won and was crowned as Miss Philippines Australia & Charity Queen Australia.

=== Miss Universe Philippines 2025 ===
Dela Cruz was appointed as The Miss Philippines Sydney 2025. She then competed at the Miss Universe Philippines 2025 pageant representing both Lucena City and the Filipino Society of Sydney. She finished as a top 24 semifinalist in the competition.

=== Queens of Australia 2025 ===
Dela Cruz competed at the Queens of Australia 2025 competition where she was crowned as Miss International Australia 2025, succeeding Selina McCloskey.

=== Miss International 2025 ===
Dela Cruz represented Australia at the Miss International 2025 beauty pageant where she exited the competition unplaced.
