= Gwendoline Soriano =

Filipino model and beauty pageant titleholder

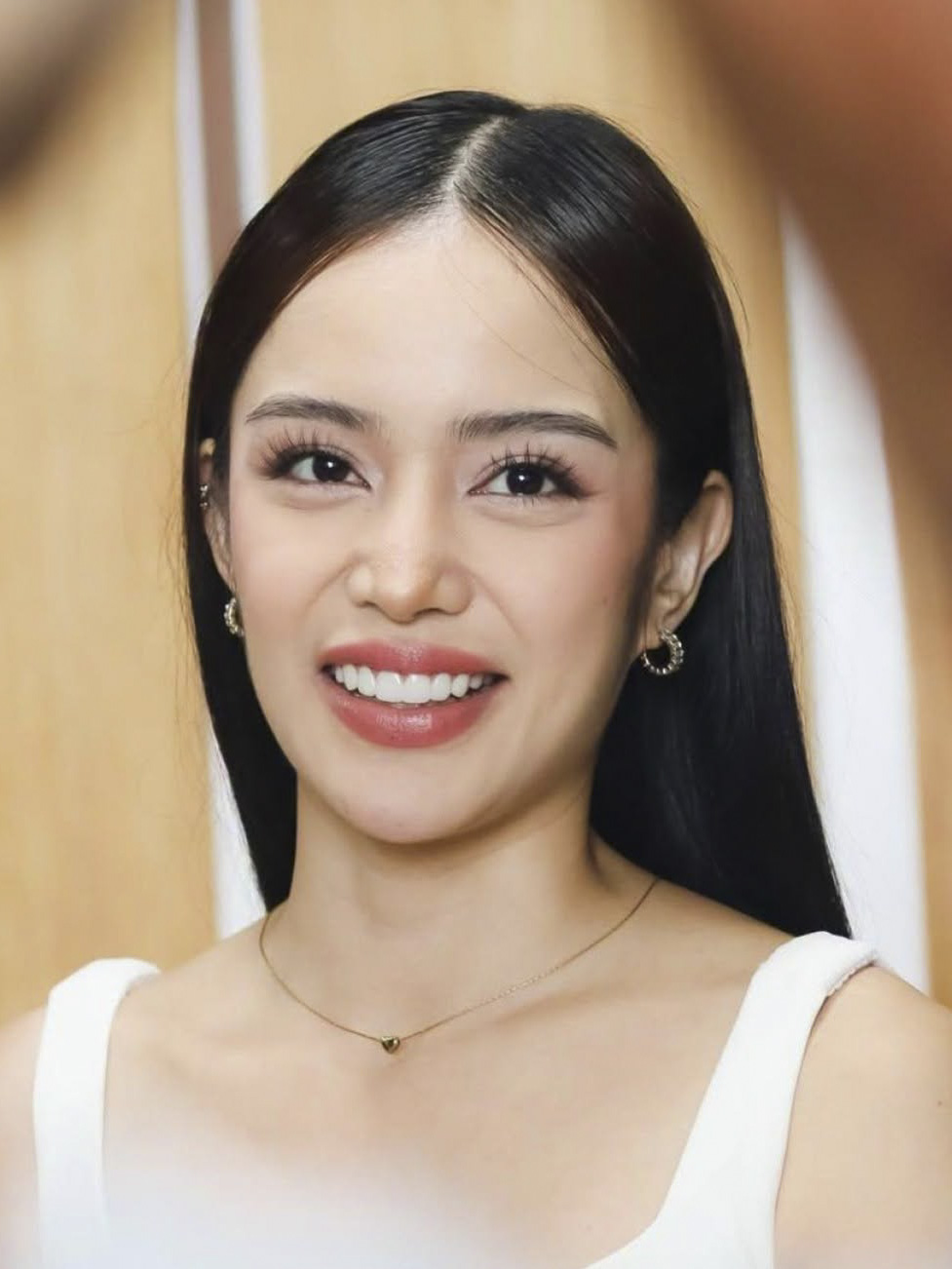
- Soriano in 2026
- Born: Gwendoline Meliz Frias Soriano; July 11, 1999 (age 27); Labrador, Pangasinan, Philippines
- Education: Trinity University of Asia (BA)
- Occupation: Beauty pageant titleholder
- Beauty pageant titleholder
- Title: Binibining Pilipinas International 2026
- Major competitions: Miss Universe Philippines 2025; (Top 12); Binibining Pilipinas 2026; (Winner – Binibining Pilipinas International 2026); Miss International 2027; (TBD)

Gwendoline Meliz Frias Soriano (born July 11, 1999) is a Filipino beauty pageant titleholder who won Binibining Pilipinas International 2026. She will represent the Philippines in Miss International 2027.

Soriano previously competed at Miss Universe Philippines 2025, where she finished as a top 12 semifinalist.

== Early life and career ==
Soriano was born in 1998 or 1999 in Labrador, Pangasinan. She studied at the Trinity University of Asia, where she earned her Bachelor of Arts in mass communication degree. As of July 2026, she is pursuing a second degree in real estate.

In 2020, Soriano appeared in an advertisement for fast food brand Jollibee as part of its "Kwentong Jollibee" series.

== Pageantry ==
=== Early stints ===
In 2019, Soriano represented Labrador at the Limgas na Pangasinan 2019 competition where she won the title. In August, she appeared on Miss Millennial Philippines, a segment of the Philippine reality show, Eat Bulaga!, where she represented Pangasinan and finished as a top 10 semifinalist after months of competition.

In April 2022, the Binibining Pilipinas pageant named Soriano as part of the top 40 for their 2022 edition. However, she would later withdraw from the competition following the death of her father during her stint in the contest; she was replaced by Patricia Ann Tan.

=== Miss Universe Philippines 2025 ===
In 2024, Soriano competed and won Miss Baguio 2024 representing Bakakeng Central. Her title allowed her to represent Baguio at Miss Universe Philippines 2025. During the pageant, she was awarded with the Best National Costume Award alongside four other candidates.

At the end of the competition, Soriano finished as a top-12 semifinalist.

=== Binibining Pilipinas 2026 ===
In 2026, Binibining Pilipinas confirmed that Soriano was among its 36 competitors for its 2026 edition, with Baguio designated as her locality. Leading up to the competition, media outlets viewed her as a leading contender for the crown. For her stint, she collaborated with designer Rian Fernandez for her evening gown.

During the coronation night, Soriano received the Best in Swimsuit and Best in Evening Gown awards alongside two special awards from sponsors. She was named as a semifinalist and progressed to the top 12 question-and-answer round. During the segment, Senator Risa Hontiveros asked her how the political environment affected her while focusing on her Binibining Pilipinas stint. In her response, she shared that she viewed the crown as a platform to share her beliefs, including those relating to politics, and encouraged the viewers be aware and demand "the things that we deserve for the country".

Soriano then progressed to the top 4 question-and-answer round, where all candidates were asked a common question about how a title will help them achieve the future they envision for themselves. In her response, she emphasized her faith, compassion, and belief that the titles at stake were an opportunity to "inspire hope, lead with compassion, and serve with purpose".

Soriano went on to win the competition, at the age of 27, being crowned Binibining Pilipinas 2026 by her predecessor, Katrina Johnson of Davao.

=== Miss International 2027 ===
Soriano will represent the Philippines at the Miss International 2027 competition.

Awards and achievements
Preceded by Katrina Johnson (Davao)	Binibining Pilipinas International; 2026	Incumbent
