= Sasha Lacuna =

Filipino beauty pageant titleholder

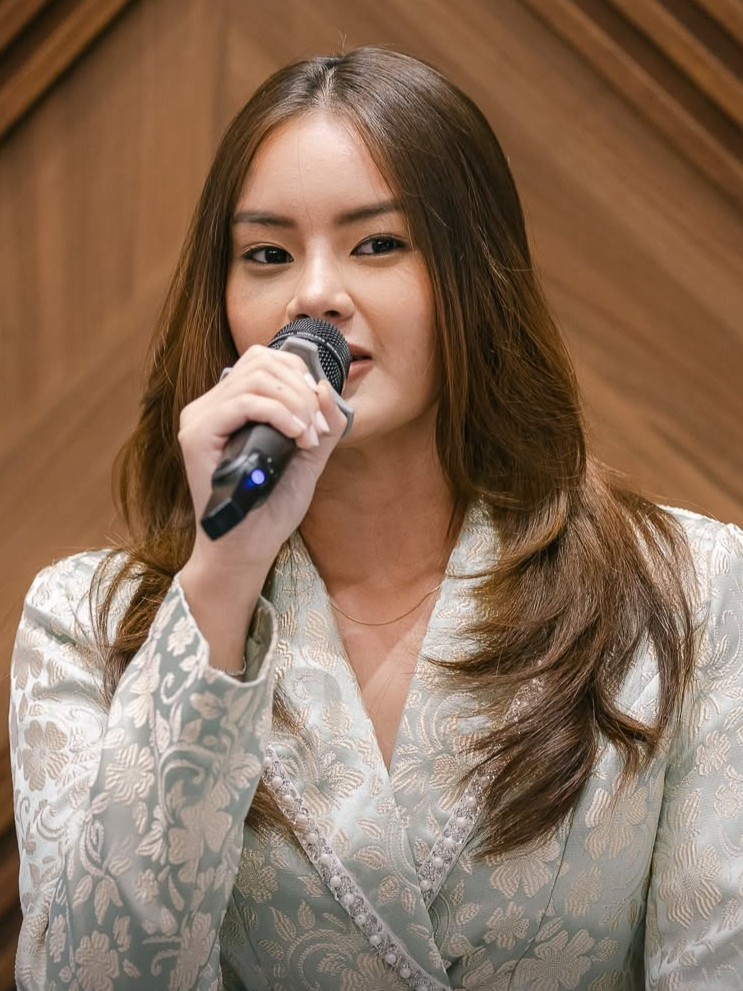
- Lacuna in 2025
- Born: Sasha-Juli Belle Penuliar Lacuna; 2003 or 2004 (age 22–23)
- Education: Southville International School and Colleges
- Beauty pageant titleholder
- Title: Binibining Pilipinas Globe 2026
- Major competitions: Miss Universe Philippines 2025; (Top 24); Binibining Pilipinas 2026; (Winner – Binibining Pilipinas Globe 2026); The Miss Globe 2026; (Top 11)

Sasha-Juli Belle Penuliar Lacuna (born 2003 or 2004) is a Filipino model and beauty pageant titleholder who won Binibining Pilipinas Globe 2026. She represented the Philippines at The Miss Globe 2026 pageant where she reached the Top 11.

== Early life and education ==
Lacuna grew up on a farm in Tarlac and was born with the skin condition Nevus of Ota. During an interview, she shared that her condition often made her a target for bullying during her childhood. Lacuna credited Miss Universe 2018 Catriona Gray as one of her role models and her primary inspiration for entering the world of pageantry. As a tech enthusiast, she is also studying information technology at Southville International School and Colleges.

== Pageantry ==
=== Early pageants ===
Lacuna earlier won as Tarlac's Binibining Kanlahi 2024, representing Tarlac City. She became the representative of Tarlac at Miss Universe Philippines 2025, where she finished as a Top 24 semifinalist, behind eventual winner Ahtisa Manalo of Quezon.

=== Binibining Pilipinas 2026 ===
On March 23, 2026, Lacuna was announced as one of the 36 delegates competing in the 62nd edition of Binibining Pilipinas, representing Tarlac.

For the national costume show held earlier in a gala night, Lacuna's costume was recognized as one of the Top 10 finalists. Her costume, titled "Ani ng Tagumpay" (transl. Harvest of Success), was designed by Simeon Cayetano. It paid tribute to Tarlac's agricultural abundance through symbols such as the carabao and golden rice fields.

During the coronation night, Lacuna advanced to the top 12 question-and-answer round, where actress Janine Gutierrez asked her how she values and protects her privacy in the age of social media. In her response, she emphasized the importance of setting boundaries online. She urged respect for public figures and all individuals on social media, reminding everyone that there are real people behind the screens. Lacuna was among the top 4 finalists who were asked the final question about how they envision their future and how winning a Binibining Pilipinas title could help achieve that goal. She answered that she envisions a future dedicated to serving the Filipino people through charitable work and believes that a Binibining Pilipinas title will enable her to continue the organization's legacy of service.

Lacuna went on to win the pageant at the age of 22, being crowned Binibining Pilipinas Globe 2026 by her predecessor, Annabelle Mae McDonnell of Iligan.

=== The Miss Globe 2026 ===
Lacuna will represent the Philippines at The Miss Globe 2026 pageant in Thailand in November 2026.

== Advocacy ==
Lacuna has worked with the Kanlahi Community Center, an institution providing family planning, women's health, and HIV and STI services in Tarlac. She has also been involved in Project Hope, a youth organization that provides technical and vocational skills training and job opportunities for out-of-school youths. Lacuna is also a committed ally and advocate for the LGBTQ community.

Awards and achievements
Preceded by Annabelle McDonnell (Iligan)	Binibining Pilipinas Globe; 2026	Incumbent
