= Georgiana Cătălina Popescu =

Romanian lawyer, model, and beauty queen

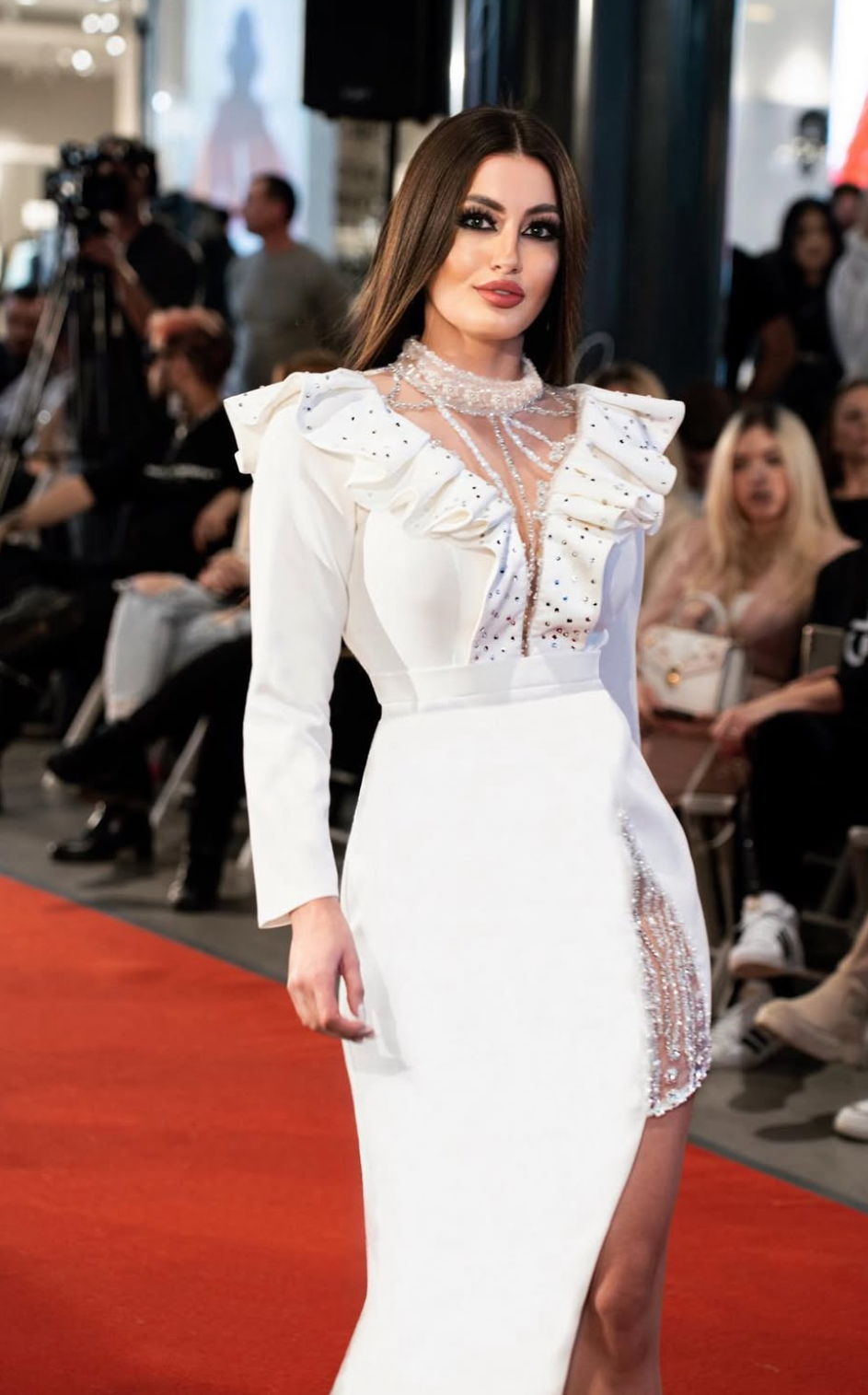
- Popescu in 2024
- Born: December 24, 1997 (age 28); Pitești, Argeș County, Romania
- Education: University of Bucharest
- Height: 175 cm (5 ft 9 in)
- Beauty pageant titleholder
- Title: Miss International Romania
- Hair color: Brown
- Eye color: Hazel
- Major competitions: Miss Earth Romania 2023 (winner); Miss International Romania 2025 (Winner)

Georgiana Cătălina Popescu (born 24 December 1997) is a Romanian lawyer, model, and beauty queen. She gained recognition after being crowned Miss International Romania 2025 and previously represented Romania at the Miss Earth 2023 pageant.

== Early life and education ==
Popescu was born on 24 December 1997 in Pitești, Argeș County, Romania. She completed a bachelor's degree in law and public administration, followed by a master's degree in European Union law and environmental law from the University of Bucharest.

== Career ==
=== Miss Earth 2023 ===
Popescu began her pageantry career by competing in Miss Earth Romania 2023, where she campaigned for environmental preservation, focusing on deforestation. She represented Romania at Miss Earth 2023 in Ho Chi Minh City, Vietnam, competing against 84 other candidates.

=== Beauty of Ghana project (2024) ===
In 2024, she participated in the international project Beauty of Ghana, a collaboration between her organization in Romania and local partners in Africa, where she was involved in activities related to sustainability, environmental protection, and cultural tourism.

=== Miss International 2025 ===
On 18 June 2025, Popescu was crowned Miss International Romania 2025 at Aristocrat Events Hall in Bucharest. She is set to represent Romania at the Miss International 2025 pageant in Tokyo, Japan, scheduled for 27 November 2025.
