= Teodolinda Rosa Rodrigues Coelho =

Angolan diplomat

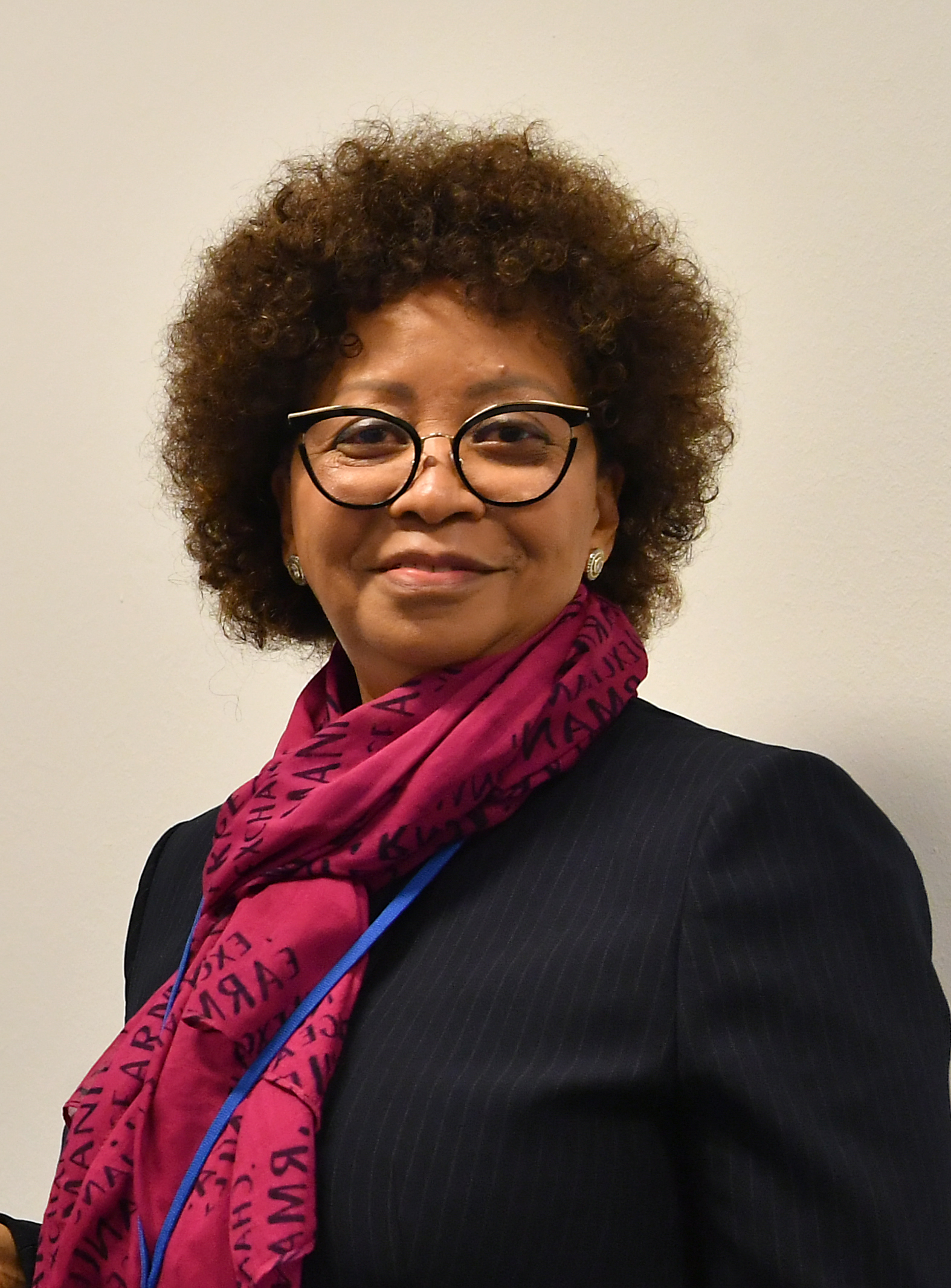
- Rodrigues Coelho in 2020

Ambassador of Angola to Japan

Ambassador of Angola to Austria

Permanent Representative of Angola to the United Nations in Vienna

Personal details
- Born: August 2, 1959 (age 67)
- Education: Agostinho Neto University
- Occupation: Diplomat

Wiki id="k2h9pl" Teodolinda Rosa Rodrigues Coelho (born August 2, 1959) is the Angolan ambassador to Japan, and was previously the Angolan ambassador to Austria and the United Nations in Vienna.

== Education ==
She earned a law degree from Agostinho Neto University in Luanda (1989) and graduated from the United Nations Institute for Training and Research in Diplomatic Practice and Negotiation, New York (2004).
