= Kiều Duy =

Vietnamese beauty pageant titleholder

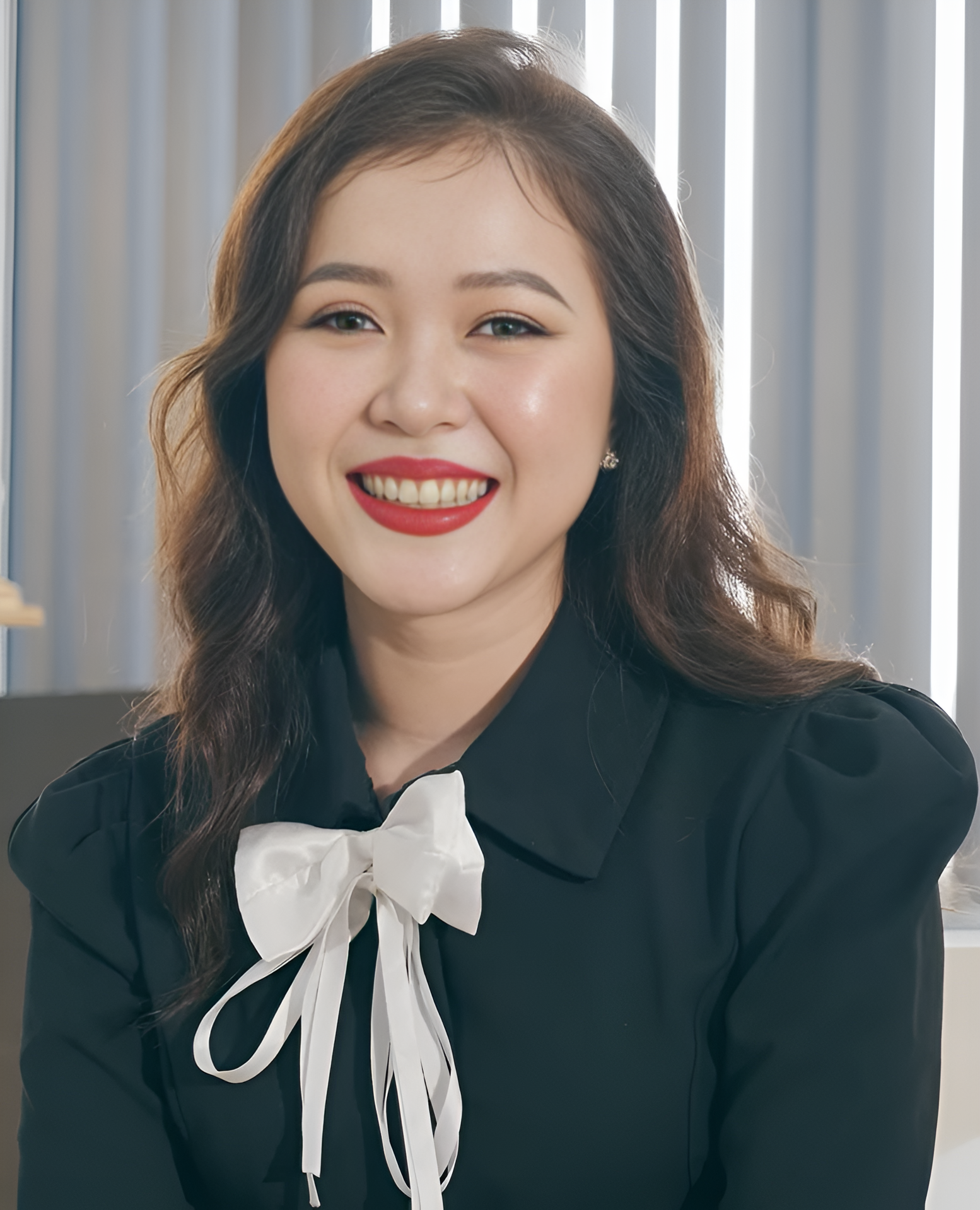
- Kiều Duy in 2023
- Born: Vĩnh Long, Vietnam
- Education: FPT University
- Beauty pageant titleholder
- Title: Miss National Vietnam 2024; Miss International Vietnam 2025
- Major competitions: Miss FPT University Cần Thơ 2022 (Winner); Miss University Cần Thơ City 2022 (1st Runner-up); Miss Tây Đô 2023 (Winner); Miss National Vietnam 2024 (Winner); Miss International 2025 (Unplaced)

Nguyễn Ngọc Kiều Duy is a Vietnamese beauty pageant titleholder. She won the inaugural Miss National Vietnam 2024 and represented Vietnam at Miss International 2025 held in October 2025 in Japan.

== Pageantry ==
Nguyễn Ngọc Kiều Duy entered and won the inaugural Miss National Vietnam, and was crowned by Phạm Kim Dung and Miss International 2024 Huỳnh Thị Thanh Thủy on December 28, 2024. She represented Vietnam at Miss International 2025 in Japan on November 27, 2025, and was unplaced.

Awards and achievements
New title	Miss National Vietnam; 2024	Incumbent
Preceded by Huỳnh Thị Thanh Thủy	Miss International Vietnam; 2025	Succeeded by Lê Phương Khánh Như
