= Miss International Malaysia =

Malaysian beauty pageant

- Formation: 1960; 66 years ago
- Type: Beauty pageant
- Headquarters: Kota Kinabalu
- Location: Malaysia
- Members: Miss International
- Official language: English
- National Director: Jenny Ngu
- President: Jawed Khan
- CEO: Dr. Aly Alias Stephen Nah
- Website: Official website

Miss International Malaysia is the pageant that selects the representative for Malaysia in the Miss International pageant, and the name of the title held by its winner.

The current Miss International Malaysia is Allyson Mei Ee of Johor. She was crowned by the outgoing titleholders Cassandra Yap and Ashlynn Ooi on 16 September 2025 at Sabah International Convention Centre, Kota Kinabalu. She will represent Malaysia at Miss International 2025.

== History ==
Miss International Malaysia Organization Board of Directors (2023)
Position	Director
President	Jawed Khan
Chairman & National Director	Jenny Ngu
CEO	Dr Aly Alias Stephen Nah
Project Manager	Jason Jonathan
Event Manager	Zaide Zambrie
Event Coordinator	Izam Ismail
State Director Semenanjung (2023–2024)	Kimberly Lee
State Director Sabah (2023–2024)	Richard Chok
State Director Sarawak (2023–2024)	Dato Raymond Jolly

The pageant was conceived by the Shaw Organisation in 1960 as a beauty pageant competition to find the representatives for Malaya and Borneo (North Borneo and Sarawak) for the Miss International pageant. Malaya first competed in Miss International was in 1960. The country was represented by Zanariah Ahmad (later Tunku Puan Zanariah) while Elizabeth Voon of North Borneo represented Borneo at the 1st edition of the pageant.

From 1960 until mid 1970s, Shaw Organisation organised the pageant, then taken over by Far East Beauty Congress for a few years and Exclusive Resources Marketing Pte Ltd from 2010 until 2016. The pageant is considered as one of the oldest international beauty pageant in Malaysia.

In 2023, the national competition was supported by the government under the Ministry of Tourism, Arts, and Culture to improve the quality and excitement of beauty pageant competition in Malaysia. The pageant was also organised by Persatuan Pentas Anak Seni Malaysia (PPASM) and GRISM.

Malaysia has placed two times in the 1960s and had not been placed until 2023, where Cassandra Yap of Johor placed in the top 15. This is additionally Malaysia's most recent, and third placement. However, Malaysia was also short-listed into the final ranking of the top 30 and top 25 during the 2019 and 2024 editions, respectively.

== Titleholders ==
Color key

- : Declared as Winner
- : Ended as runner-up or top 5/6 finalists
- : Ended as one of the semi-finalists
- : Unplaced but short-listed into the quarter-finalists/Unplaced but given special award(s)
- : Withdrew or did not attend the competition

Year	Candidate	State	Placement & Performance	
Year	Candidate	State	Placements	Special award(s)
2026	Wenwei Yap	Kelantan	TBA	
2025	Allyson Mei Ee	Johor	Unplaced	
2024	Ashlyn Ooi	Penang	Top 25	1 Special Awards: 2nd runner-up – Best Evening Gown
2023	Cassandra Yap	Johor	Top 15	1 Special Awards: 3rd runner-up – Best National Costume
2022	Giselle Tay	Kuala Lumpur	Unplaced	
2019	Charmaine Chew	Kedah	Top 30	2 Special Awards: Top 7 – Best National Costume; Top 10 – Miss Photogenic
2018	Mandy Loo	Penang	Unplaced	1 Special Awards: Top 15 – Best Body
2017	Annie Wong	Sarawak	Unplaced	
2016	Olivia Nicholas	Perak	Unplaced	
2015	Immaculate Lojuki	Sabah	Unplaced	
2014	Rubini Sambanthan	Selangor	Unplaced	
2013	Charissa Chong	Selangor	Unplaced	
2012	Olivia Teng	Perak	Unplaced	
2011	Celine Phong	Perak	Unplaced	
2010	Chantelle Chuah	Perak	Unplaced	
2009	Juan Tay Tze	Selangor	Unplaced	
2008	Tham Zi Wei	Negeri Sembilan	Unplaced	
2007	Yennie Yim	Penang	Unplaced	
2006	Iris Hong	Penang	Unplaced	
2005	Winnie Chan	Negeri Sembilan	Unplaced	
2004	Lim Lee Ching	Kuala Lumpur	Unplaced	
2003	Ester Tan	Selangor	Unplaced	
2002	Krystal Pang	Kuala Lumpur	Unplaced	
2001	Felina Cheah	Penang	Unplaced	
2000	Alda Stannis Kasun	Sabah	Unplaced	
1999	Andrea Franklin	Penang	Unplaced	
1986	Latonia Chang	Kuala Lumpur	Unplaced	
1984	Jennifer Foong	Malacca	Unplaced	1 Special Awards: Miss Friendship
1983	Helen Ann Peters	Penang	Unplaced	
1982	Karen Seet	Terengganu	Unplaced	
1980	Christina Leong	Johor	Unplaced	
1979	Nancie Foo	Johor	Unplaced	
1978	Farida Abdul Samad	Selangor	Unplaced	
1977	Dorothea Chuah	Perak	Unplaced	
1976	Fauziah Haron	Johor	Unplaced	
1975	Jenny Liew	Kuala Lumpur	Unplaced	
1974	Amy Sibert	Kuala Lumpur	Unplaced	
1973	Nancy Thong	Kedah	Unplaced	
1972	Francesca Lee	Penang	Unplaced	
1970	Lucy Lim Lee	Pahang	Unplaced	
1969	Pauline Chai	Perak	Unplaced	
1968	Maznah Mohamed Ali	Johor	Unplaced	
1967	Marjorie Rongsank	Penang	Unplaced	
1965	Linda Lim	Singapore	Top 15	
1962	Brenda Alvisse	Penang	Unplaced	
1961	Helen Tan	Kuala Lumpur	Top 15	2 Special Awards: Winner – Best National Costume; Winner – Speech Division
1960	Zanariah Ahmad	Kuala Lumpur	Unplaced	

== List of Runners-up ==
=== Miss International Malaysia ===
Year	Winner (1st Place)	1st Runner Up (2nd Place)	2nd Runner Up (3rd Place)	3rd Runner Up (4th Place)	4th Runner Up (5th Place)
1961	Helen Tan; Kuala Lumpur	Ann Woodford; Malacca	Diana Kok; Perak	Did not awarded	
1962	Brenda Alvisse; Penang	Maimunah Mustafa; Perak	Unknown	Did not awarded	
1965	Linda Lim; Singapore	Betty Lim; Kuala Lumpur	Alice Woon; Singapore	Did not awarded	
1966	Marjorie Rongsank; Penang	Monkam Siprasome; Kedah	Habsah Hamdan; Sarawak	Shirley Palmer; Selangor	Maznah Ali; Johor
1968	Maznah Ali; Johor; Ramlah Alang; Terengganu	Doris Choong; Selangor	Edna Wanda Jacobs; Kelantan	Did not awarded	
1969	Pauline Chai; Perak	Lucy Lim; Pahang	Unknown	Did not awarded	
2017	Annie Wong; Sarawak	Lynn Hang; Kedah	Audrey Lee; Kedah	Did not awarded	
2018	Mandy Loo; Penang	Renu Sanderan; Pahang	Janie Chin; Perak	Did not awarded	
2022	Giselle Tay; Kuala Lumpur	Kash Bhullar; Selangor	Jean Kueh; Selangor	Did not awarded	
2023	Cassandra Yap; Johor	Kimberly Vung; Sabah	Christina Lee; Perak	Aaliyah Wunsch; Sarawak	Did not awarded
2024	Ashlyn Ooi; Penang	Kimberly Vung; Sabah	Christina Lee; Perak	Aaliyah Wunsch; Sarawak	Did not awarded
2025	Allyson Mei Ee; Johor	Yap Wen Wei; Kelantan	Chua Jian Vern; Selangor	Did not awarded	

=== Miss International Borneo ===
Year	Winner (1st Place)	1st Runner Up (2nd Place)	2nd Runner Up (3rd Place)	3rd Runner Up (4th Place)	4th Runner Up (5th Place)
1960	Elizabeth Voon; North Borneo	Mabel Ong; Kuching	Rachel Han; Seria		
1962	Jane Lim; North Borneo	Teresa Pang; Brunei	Cecelia Phung; Brunei		

== See also ==
- Miss International
