= The Miss Philippines 2023 =

1st The Miss Philippines pageant

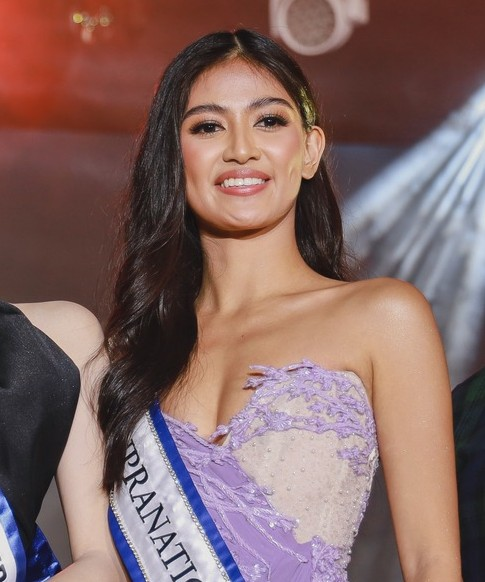
- Alethea Ambrosio
- Date: October 24, 2023
- Presenters: Rabiya Mateo; André Brouillette
- Entertainment: The Gigi Vibes; Fourth Nattawat; Josh Cullen
- Venue: SM Mall of Asia Arena, Bay City, Pasay, Metro Manila
- Broadcaster: Empire.ph (online streaming via YouTube)
- Entrants: 21
- Placements: 10
- Winner: Alethea Ambrosio; Bulacan

The Miss Philippines 2023 was the first The Miss Philippines pageant, held at the SM Mall of Asia Arena in Bay City, Pasay, Metro Manila, on October 24, 2023.

Along with the Mister Pilipinas Worldwide 2023 pageant, The Miss Philippines 2023 was organized as part of the larger The Filipino Festival event.

Pauline Amelinckx, who was appointed as the inaugural The Miss Philippines on August 10, 2023, crowned Alethea Ambrosio of Bulacan as her successor at the end of the event.

== Results ==
=== Placements ===
Map showing the placements of The Miss Philippines 2023 candidates The Miss Philippines 2023 Top 4 Top 10 11–21 No entrants

| Placement | Contestant | Ref. |
|---|---|---|
| The Miss Philippines 2023 | Bulacan – Alethea Ambrosio | |
| Top 4 | Cebu City – Chantal Elise Schmidt; Mandaluyong – Isabelle de los Santos; Northern California – Blessa Ericha Figueroa | |
| Top 10 | Cavite – Vincy Trish Cordova; Cebu – Maria Izobel Taguiam; Iloilo City – Raniele Shaine Saulog; Hawaii – Issha Rose Mata; Pampanga – Leigh Danielle Sunga; Southern California – Hanna Reese Uyan | |

=== Appointments ===
In a separate ceremony four months after the coronation on February 18, 2024, five finalists, including The Miss Philippines, were appointed to represent the Philippines on the following pageants:

Color keys

- The contestant was a runner-up in an international pageant.
- The contestant was a semi-finalist in an international pageant.

| Title | Delegate | International placement | Ref. |
|---|---|---|---|
| The Miss Philippines Supranational 2024 | Bulacan Alethea Ambrosio | Top 12 Miss Supranational 2024 | |
| The Miss Philippines Asia Pacific 2024 | Northern California Blessa Ericha Figueroa | 3rd Runner-Up Miss Asia Pacific International 2024 | |
| The Miss Philippines Aura 2024 | Mandaluyong Isabelle de los Santos | 1st Runner-Up Miss Aura International 2024 | |
| The Miss Philippines Eco International 2024 | Cebu City Chantal Elise Schmidt | 1st Runner-Up Miss Eco International 2024 | |
| The Miss Philippines Eco Teen 2024 | Southern California Hanna Reese Uyan | Did not compete Miss Eco Teen International 2024 | |

== Special awards ==
| Awards | Delegate | Ref. |
|---|---|---|
| People's Choice Awardee | Cavite – Vincy Trish Cordova | |
| Miss Kemans | Northern California – Blessa Ericha Figueroa | |
| Miss Hello Glow | Mandaluyong – Isabelle de los Santos | |
| Miss Ever Bilena | Cebu City – Chantal Elise Schmidt | |
| Miss Fairy Skin | Cebu City – Chantal Elise Schmidt | |
| Miss Great Lengths | Mandaluyong – Isabelle de los Santos | |

== Background ==
External videos
- The Miss Philippines 2023 (and Mister Pilipinas Worldwide 2023) Finals
- The Filipino Festival Awards Night. The Miss Philippines & Mister Pilipinas Worldwide Finals. by Empire Philippines

=== Qualification for international pageants ===
The Miss Philippines 2023 will determine the Philippines' representatives for the 2024 editions of Miss Supranational, Miss Asia Pacific International, Miss Aura International, and Miss Eco International .

The representatives will be selected among the top four placers.

=== Hosts and performers ===
Beatrice Luigi Gomez and Annabelle McDonnell duo as presenters for Mister Pilipinas Worldwide 2023 final event while Rabiya Mateo and André Brouillette hosted The Miss Philippines 2023 segment in the last hours of the festival.

The Gigi Vibes led by Gigi de Lana did the opener performing covers of songs by Michael Jackson. Thai actor Fourth Nattawat and Josh Cullen of SB19 also did their own performance in-between the pageant's segments.

=== Format ===
The coronation night would not feature the tradition swimsuit competition portion. A Runway Segment featuring the contestants in formal wear will be featured as well as a portion were candidates would make speeches related to Filipino culture and heritage in a way similar to that done on TED Talks.

An online poll was also opened with the results accounting for 50 percent of the contestants' final score.

== Pageant ==
External videos
- The Miss Philippines 2023 (and Mister Pilipinas Worldwide 2023) Finals
- The Filipino Festival Awards Night. The Miss Philippines & Mister Pilipinas Worldwide Finals. by Empire Philippines

The program for The Miss Philippines 2023 started after the conclusion of the Mister Pilipinas Worldwide 2023 men's pageant. A video of the 21 contestants in white dress introducing themselves was displayed. Five special awards named after the program's sponsors were then conferred.

The contestants then walked the runway wearing red short dresses by Mikee Andrei. The top ten candidates, along those who did not make the shortlist, would then be announced who would showcase their own custom-made evening gowns.

Four were selected among the ten. The top four candidates would engage in a TED Talks-style speech with the prompt "What to you is the true identity of a Filipino, and how do you intend to promote it to the world?". Alethea Ambrosio from Bulacan was named the pageant winner after this portion and was crowned by appointed titleholder Pauline Amelinckx.

== Contestants ==
Twenty-one contestants competed for the title. The entrants underwent a screening process. They had to be from 18 and 32 years old. The pageant was also open to women who are married and/or have children.

| Locality | Contestant |
|---|---|
| Bacolod | Janine Gelera |
| Batangas | Aleckzandra Beatrice Engson |
| Bulacan | Alethea Ambrosio |
| Cavite | Vincy Trish Cordova |
| Cebu | Maria Izobel Taguiam |
| Cebu City | Chantal Elise Schmidt |
| Hawaii | Issha Rose Mata |
| Iloilo | Gessa Evonne Villaruel |
| Iloilo City | Raniele Shaine Saulog |
| Las Piñas | Therese Abbygayle Laurel |
| Mandaluyong | Isabelle de los Santos |
| Northern California | Blessa Ericha Figueroa |
| Nueva Ecija | Gila Salvador Arellano |
| Pampanga | Leigh Danielle Sunga |
| Pangasinan | Rebecca Rose Ayuban |
| Pasig | Alyssandrea Denise Tan |
| Quezon City | Nicole Trisha Lao |
| Taguig | Alcea Aira de Jesus |
| Toledo | Rikka R. Alcomendras |
| Southern California | Hanna Reese Uyan |
| Zambales | Joanna Marie Rabe |
