= The Miss Philippines =

National beauty pageant in the Philippines

- Type: International Selection Pageant
- Parent organization: Empire Philippines
- Headquarters: Bonifacio Global City, Taguig, Metro Manila, Philippines
- Country represented: Philippines (Note: The pageant includes Filipino diaspora in the United States)
- Qualifies for: 8 (see Titles)
- First edition: 2023
- Most recent edition: 2023
- Language: Filipino; English
- Website: www.missuniverseph.com

The Miss Philippines is a part of Miss Universe Philippines beauty pageant and a culture and heritage organization that selects the Philippines' official representative to international pageants including Miss Supranational, Miss Charm, Miss Cosmo, Miss Eco International, Miss Worldwide, Miss Tourism World, Miss Teen Universe, and Miss Eco Teen International.

== History ==
The pageant was launched in 2023, and the organizers would partner with Miss Universe Philippines.

In September 2023, pageant announced its partnership with the Miss Asia Pacific International organization.

Alexie Brooks' victory as Miss Eco International 2025 marked the first international title under The Miss Philippines Organization. This achievement made her the third Filipina to win the competition. It was followed by Katrina Llegado's victory as Miss Supranational 2026 the following year after, making her the second Filipina to win the pageant.

== Format ==
The first Miss Philippines pageant did not feature the tradition swimsuit competition section, instead a runway section had the contestants in formal wear. Contestants also made speeches related to Filipino culture and heritage in a similar fashion to TED Talks.

An online poll was also accounted for 50 percent of the contestants' final score.

== Titles ==
Note that the year designates the time Empire Philippines has acquired that particular pageant franchise.

Current Franchise
Titles	Year	No. of Wins
Miss Supranational	2023 — Present	1 (2026)
Miss Charm	2023 — Present	0
Miss Cosmo	2024 — Present	0
Miss Eco International	2024 — Present	1 (2025)
Miss Eco Teen International	2024, 2026 — Present	0
Miss Worldwide	2026 — Present	0
Miss Tourism World	2026 — Present	0
Miss Teen Universe	2026 — Present	0
Former Franchise
Titles	Year	No. of Wins
Miss Asia Pacific International	2024	0
Miss Aura International	2024	0

== Editions ==
Below is the complete list of The Miss Philippines editions.

Edition	Date	The Miss Philippines	Presenters	Entrants	Finals venue
1st	October 24, 2023	Alethea Ambrosio	André Brouillette; Rabiya Mateo	21	SM Mall of Asia Arena, Pasay

=== Titleholders ===
Year	Current Titles								Ref.
Year	Miss Supranational Philippines	Miss Charm Philippines	Miss Cosmo Philippines	Miss Eco International Philippines	Miss Eco Teen Philippines	Miss Worldwide Philippines	Miss Tourism World Philippines	Miss Teen Universe Philippines	Ref.
Appointed	Additional acquired franchise	Annabelle McDonnell^{1} Misamis Oriental	Additional acquired franchise	Additional acquired franchise	Additional acquired franchise	Additional acquired franchise	Additional acquired franchise	Additional acquired franchise	
Appointed	Pauline Amelinckx^{2} Bohol	Krishnah Gravidez^{3} Baguio	Additional acquired franchise	Additional acquired franchise	Additional acquired franchise	Additional acquired franchise	Additional acquired franchise	Additional acquired franchise	
2023	Alethea Ambrosio; Bulacan	Not awarded	Additional acquired franchise	Chantal Elise Schmidt; Cebu City	Additional acquired franchise	Additional acquired franchise	Additional acquired franchise	Additional acquired franchise	
Appointed	Tarah Valencia; Baguio	Kayla Carter^{4} Northern California	Ahtisa Manalo^{5} Quezon	Alexie Brooks; Iloilo City	Raven Doctor; Palawan	Additional acquired franchise	Additional acquired franchise	Additional acquired franchise	
Appointed	Tarah Valencia; Baguio	Cyrille Payumo; Pampanga	Ahtisa Manalo^{5} Quezon	Alexie Brooks; Iloilo City	Raven Doctor; Palawan	Additional acquired franchise	Additional acquired franchise	Additional acquired franchise	
Appointed	Katrina Llegado; Taguig	Not awarded	Chelsea Fernandez; Sultan Kudarat	Gabbi Carballo; Cebu City	Not awarded	Additional acquired franchise	Additional acquired franchise	Additional acquired franchise	
Appointed	Allyson Hetland; Pampanga	Apriel Smith; Cebu City	Ysabella Ysmael; Taguig	Jenrose Javier; Sultan Kudarat	Trexy Roxas; Iligan	Nicole Borromeo; Cebu	Marian Arellano; Tarlac	Catherine Wardle; Samar Island	

- ^1 Appointed as The Miss Philippines Charm 2023 after her first runner-up finish at Miss Universe Philippines 2022.
- ^2 Formally crowned as The Miss Philippines Supranational 2023 in a separate event after the Miss Universe Philippines 2023 coronation.
- ^3 Formally crowned as The Miss Philippines Charm 2024 in a separate event after the Miss Universe Philippines 2023 coronation. Eventually resigned to the title due to the delay of Miss Charm 2024.
- ^4 Appointed as The Miss Philippines Charm 2024 after Gravidez relinquished her title.
- ^5 Stacey Gabriel, Miss Universe Philippines 2024 first runner-up, declined any title. Manalo, the second runner-up, opted to be crowned as The Miss Philippines Cosmo 2024. As the next candidate in line, she is eligible to select from any of the titles granted by The Miss Philippines.

== Placements ==
The following are the placements of The Miss Philippines titleholders in international pageants.

=== Current titles ===
==== Miss Supranational ====
Year	Delegate	Represented	Competition performance		Ref.
Year	Delegate	Represented	Placements	Other award(s)	Ref.
2023	Pauline Amelinckx	Bohol	1st Runner-Up	2 Special awards: Supra Chat Winner; Woman of Substance Awardee	
2024	Alethea Ambrosio	Bulacan	Top 12	1 Special award: Miss Supranational Asia & Oceania	
2025	Tarah Valencia	Baguio	3rd Runner-Up		
2026	Katrina Llegado	Taguig	Miss Supranational 2026		
2027	Allyson Hetland	Pampanga			

==== Miss Charm ====
Year	Delegate	Represented	Competition performance		Ref.
Year	Delegate	Represented	Placements	Other award(s)	Ref.
2023	Annabelle McDonnell	Misamis Oriental	1st Runner-Up		
2024	Kayla Jean Carter	Northern California	Top 20		
2025	Cyrille Payumo	Pampanga	Top 20	1 Special award: Best National Costume	
2026	Apriel Smith	Cebu City			

==== Miss Cosmo ====
Year	Delegate	Represented	Competition performance		Ref.
Year	Delegate	Represented	Placements	Other award(s)	Ref.
2024	Ahtisa Manalo	Quezon	Top 10	2 Special awards: Cosmo People's Choice; Cosmo Tea Culture Tourism Ambassador	
2025	Chelsea Fernandez	Sultan Kudarat	Runner-Up	4 Special awards: Cosmo People's Choice; Best in Evening Gown; Eventista's Iconic Swimsuit; Parade of Beauty Award	
2026	Ysabella Ysmael	Taguig			

==== Miss Eco International ====
Year	Delegate	Represented	Competition performance		Ref.
Year	Delegate	Represented	Placements	Other award(s)	Ref.
2024	Chantal Elise Schmidt	Cebu City	1st Runner-Up	2 Special awards: Best in Evening Gown; Best National Costume	
2025	Alexie Brooks	Iloilo City	Miss Eco International 2025	1 Special award: Best National Costume	
2026	Gabbi Carballo	Cebu City	Top 21	1 Special award: Miss Eco Top Model	
2027	Jenrose Javier	Sultan Kudarat			

==== Miss Eco Teen International ====
Year	Delegate	Represented	Competition performance		Ref.
Year	Delegate	Represented	Placements	Other award(s)	Ref.
2024	Raven Doctor	Palawan	3rd Runner-Up	1 Special award: Miss Eco Teen Asia	
Mister and Miss Philippine Youth acquired the franchise in 2025
2026	Trexy Roxas	Iligan	Top 11	3 Special awards: Best Eco Dress; Best in Evening Gown; Miss Eco Teen Asia	

==== Miss Teen Universe ====
Year	Delegate	Represented	Competition performance		Ref.
Year	Delegate	Represented	Placements	Other award(s)	Ref.
2026	Catherine Wardle	Samar Island	2nd Runner-Up	1 Special award: Social Project Winner	

==== Miss Tourism World ====
Year	Delegate	Represented	Competition performance		Ref.
Year	Delegate	Represented	Placements	Other award(s)	Ref.
2026	Marian Arellano	Tarlac			

==== Miss Worldwide ====
Year	Delegate	Represented	Competition performance		Ref.
Year	Delegate	Represented	Placements	Other award(s)	Ref.
2027	Nicole Borromeo	Cebu			

=== Former titles ===
==== Miss Asia Pacific International ====
Year	Delegate	Represented	Competition performance		Ref.
Year	Delegate	Represented	Placements	Other award(s)	Ref.
2024	Blessa Ericha Figueroa	Northern California	3rd Runner-Up	2 Special awards: Miss Stronghold; Miss Zen Institute	
Miss Grand Philippines acquired the franchise in 2025

==== Miss Aura International ====
Year	Delegate	Represented	Competition performance		Ref.
Year	Delegate	Represented	Placements	Other award(s)	Ref.
2024	Isabelle de los Santos	Mandaluyong	1st Runner-Up	1 Special award: Fan Vote Winner	
Miss Pearl of the Orient Philippines acquired the franchise in 2025

== See also ==
- Philippines at major beauty pageants
- Big Four beauty pageants
- List of beauty pageants
- Miss Universe Philippines
- Miss World Philippines
- Binibining Pilipinas
- Miss Philippines Earth
- Reina Filipinas
- The Miss Philippines
- Miss Island Philippines
- Mutya ng Pilipinas
- Miss Pearl of the Orient Philippines
- Miss Republic of the Philippines
