= Miss Universe Philippines Pampanga =

Regional pageant title

- Type: Women's beauty pageant
- Province represented: Pampanga
- Qualifies for: Miss Universe Philippines
- First edition: 2020
- Most recent edition: 2025
- Provincial Director: Amiel de Dios
- Creative Director: Jay Luna
- Head of Events: Michael Cacai Muñoz
- Head of Communication: Izzy Basilio

Miss Universe Philippines Pampanga (MUPP) is a provincial title awarded by the Miss Universe Philippines organization representing the province of Pampanga. The titleholder promotes the province’s rich culture, heritage, and tourism as Pampanga’s official Ambassador. The winner of the title is eligible to compete for the national Miss Universe Philippines crown.

== History ==
The Miss Universe Philippines Pampanga title became part of the Miss Universe Philippines Accredited Partners Program after its separation from the Binibining Pilipinas organization in 2019.

The titleholder is selected either through local pageants or appointed by provincial organizers. Participants typically engage in preparation activities focused on public speaking, runway presentation, and community engagement before representing Pampanga in the national competition.

== Selection process ==
The Miss Universe Philippines Pampanga pageant features multiple segments, including evening gown, swimsuit, and question-and-answer rounds. Contestants are judged on their beauty, intelligence, and advocacy. Local mentors, along with Miss Universe Philippines (MUPH) officials, will guide the winners in preparing for the national competition.

== Titleholders ==
| Year | Miss Universe Philippines – Pampanga | Current titles | | | | |
| Year | Miss Universe Philippines – Pampanga | The Miss Philippines – Pampanga | 1st runner up | 2nd runner up | 3rd runner up | 4th runner up |
|---|---|---|---|---|---|---|
| 2020 | Patricia Mae Santos ({Pampanga) | No franchise pageant yet | | | | |
| 2021 | No franchise pageant and representative sent | | | | | |
| 2022 | Alyssa Georgia Felix (Macabebe) | No franchise pageant yet | | | | |
| 2023 | Mary Angelique Manto (Lubao) | No franchise pageant yet | | | | |
| 2024 | Cyrille Payumo (Porac) | Alyssandra Ting^{4} (San Fernando) | Gwen Tuazon (Guagua) | Rena Marie Flores (Apalit) | Not awarded | |
| 2025 | Krizza Nicole Yco^{1} (Santo Tomas) | Not awarded | Ira de Castro^{3} (San Jose, Angeles) | Mhariel Ann Atis (Babo Sacan, Porac) | Sarah Bahkit (Santa Rita) | Rhancoise Marie Mayangitan (Candaba) |
| 2025 | Rhancoise Marie Mayangitan^{2} (Candaba) | Not awarded | Ira de Castro^{3} (San Jose, Angeles) | Mhariel Ann Atis (Babo Sacan, Porac) | Sarah Bahkit (Santa Rita) | Not awarded |
| 2026 | No Pageant Held | | | | | |

Notes:

- ^1 Relinquished her title as Miss Universe Philippines - Pampanga 2025 days after the competition.
- ^2 Appointed to compete at Miss Universe Philippines 2025 after Yco withdrew.
- ^3 Appointed to compete at Miss Universe Philippines 2025 under the Angeles City franchise.
- ^4 Won The Miss Philippines - Pampanga 2024 title but national competition has been canceled.

== Placement at Miss Universe Philippines ==
| Year | Miss Universe Philippines Pampanga | Hometown | Age | Placement at MUPH | Awards | Ref. |
|---|---|---|---|---|---|---|
Selected to join under Pampanga sash
| 2020 | Patricia Mae Santos | Angeles City | 26 | Unplaced | | |
| 2021 | No representative sent | | | | | |
| 2022 | Alyssa Georgia Felix | Macabebe | 27 | Unplaced | | |
| 2023 | Mary Angelique Manto | Lubao | 26 | 2nd runner-up | Miss Avon; Miss Cavaso; Miss Jewelmer; Miss Okada; Runway Challenge Winner | |
Start of Miss Universe Philippines - Pampanga franchise
| 2024 | Cyrille Payumo | Porac | 26 | Top 10; Appointed - Miss Charm Philippines 2025 | | |
| 2025 | Krizza Nicole Yco | Santo Tomas | 22 | Withdrew | | |
| 2025 | Rhancoise Marie Mayangitan | Candaba | 29 | Unplaced | | |
| 2026 | Allyson Hetland | Angeles City | 24 | Top 7 Appointed - Miss Supranational Philippines 2027 | | |

== See also ==
- Miss Universe Philippines Cebu
- Miss Universe Philippines Cavite
