= Miss World Philippines 2019 =

9th Miss World Philippines pageant

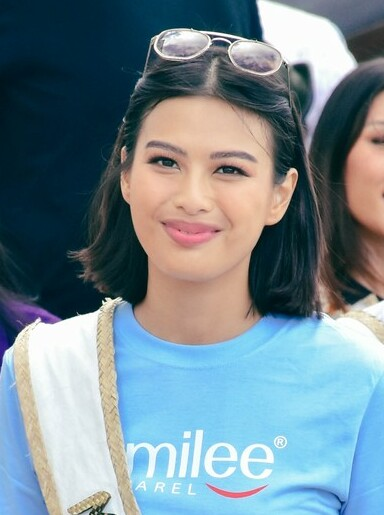
- Michelle Dee
- Date: September 15, 2019
- Presenters: Laura Lehmann; Victor Basa; Edgar Allan Guzman; Winwyn Marquez
- Venue: Smart Araneta Coliseum, Quezon City, Metro Manila, Philippines
- Broadcaster: GMA Network
- Entrants: 40
- Placements: 22
- Winner: Michelle Dee; Makati
- Photogenic: Katrina Llegado, Taguig

Miss World Philippines 2019 was the ninth Miss World Philippines pageant, held at the Smart Araneta Coliseum in Quezon City, Metro Manila, Philippines, on September 15, 2019.

Katarina Rodriguez crowned Michelle Dee as her successor at the end of the event. Dee represented the Philippines at Miss World 2019 in London, where she reached the top 12.

== Results ==
=== Placements ===
Color keys

- The contestant was a runner-up in an international pageant.
- The contestant was a semi-finalist in an international pageant.

| Placement | Contestant | International Placement |
|---|---|---|
| Miss World Philippines 2019 | #21 – Michelle Dee | Top 12 – Miss World 2019 |
| Miss Eco Philippines 2019 | #24 – Kelley Day | 1st Runner-Up – Miss Eco International 2021 |
| Reina Hispanoamericana Filipinas 2019 | #30 – Maria Katrina Llegado | 5th Runner-Up – Reina Hispanoamericana 2019 |
| Miss Multinational Philippines 2019 | #1 – Isabelle de Leon | Pageant Not Held |
| Miss Tourism Philippines 2019 | #4 – Glyssa Leiann Perez | Special Title |
| Miss Eco Teen Philippines 2019 | #23 – Vanessa-Mae Walters, (Dethroned); #28 – Mary Daena Zaide Resurrecion, (Assumed) | Top 5 – Miss Eco Teen International 2019 |
| First Princess | #40 – Shannon Christie Kerver | |
| Second Princess | #37 – Casie Banks | |
| Top 12 | #6 – Michelle Arceo; #9 – Tracy Perez; #14 – Kimberly Hakenson; #26 – Michelle Thorlund | |
| Top 22 | #8 – Kalea Rivero Pitel; #10 – Jacqueline Diamzon Hammoude; #11 – Kayesha Chua; #12 – Trisha Gutierrez; #18 – Ruffa Nava; #20 – Ilene de Vera; #27 – Patrixia Santos; #31 – Sheila Marie Reyes; #35 – Louise Theunis; #38 – Aura Shaznay | |

=== Appointed titleholder ===
A Filipina was appointed to compete internationally in 2020 since the national pageant was not held in 2020 due to the COVID-19 pandemic.

| Title | Delegate | International Placement | Special Awards | Ref. |
|---|---|---|---|---|
| Miss Eco Teen Philippines 2020 | Laguna – Roberta Tamondong | Miss Eco Teen International 2020 | Best in Eco Dress; Best in National Costume | |

== Awards ==
Different sets of awards were given in this edition.

=== Special awards ===
| Special Award | # | Candidate |
|---|---|---|
| Miss Photogenic | 30 | Katrina Llegado |
| Best in Evening Gown | 30 | Katrina Llegado |
| Best in Swimsuit (Swimsuits by BENCH) | 23 | Vanessa-Mae Walters |

=== Sponsor Awards ===
| Sponsor Award | # | Candidate |
|---|---|---|
| Miss CAD Smile | 26 | Michelle Thorlund |
| Miss BlueWater Day Spa | 21; 37 | Michelle Dee; Kristi Celyn Banks |
| Miss Myra E | 21 | Michelle Dee |
| Best Skin by Cathy Valencia; Advanced Skin Clinic | 21; 24 | Michelle Dee; Kelley Day |
| Miss Cabalen | 30 | Katrina Llegado |
| Miss Big Chill | 24 | Kelley Day |
| Miss Bench | 21 | Michelle Dee |
| Miss GCOX | 21 | Michelle Dee |

== Fast Track Events ==
Fast Track Events winners are as follows:

| Fast Track | Finalists | Winner |
|---|---|---|
| Talent Competition | #01 - Isabelle de Leon; #06 - Michelle Arceo Kain; #10 - Jacqueline Diamzon Hammoude; #12 - Patrisha Kamille Gutierrez; #31 - Sheila Marie Reyes; #34 - Sammie Anne Legaspi; #39 - Erica Rose Madlangsakay | #31 - Sheila Marie Reyes |
| Sports Challenge | #06 - Michelle Arceo Kain; - Patricia Ann Tan - Kalea Lorren Pitel - Michelle Dee: #24 - Kelley Day | #21 - Michelle Dee |
| Beach Beauty | #09 - Tracy Maureen Perez; #14 - Kimberly Hakenson; 1. 21 - Michelle Dee; 2. 23 - Vanessa-Mae Walters; - Kelley Day - Sheila Marie Reyes: #37 - Kristi Celyn Banks | - Vanessa-Mae Walters |
| Multimedia | #01 - Isabelle de Leon; 1. 04 - Glyssa Leiann Perez; #23 - Vanessa-Mae Walters; #24 - Kelley Day; #37 - Kristi Celyn Banks; 1. 38 - Aura Shaznay Tumulak | #38 - Aura Shaznay Tumulak |
| Top Model | #11 - Kayesha Clauden Chua; #21 - Michelle Dee; #26 - Michelle Thorlund; 1. 30 - Maria Katrina Llegado; #33 - Justiene Ortega | #30 - Katrina Llegado |
| Charity | All delegates | #26 - Michelle Thorlund; #40 - Shannon Christie Kerver |
| Beauty with a Purpose | All delegates | - Glyssa Leiann Perez |

== Contestants ==
40 contestants competed in this edition.

| No. | Contestant | Age | Hometown |
|---|---|---|---|
| 1 | Isabelle de Leon | 25 | Quezon City |
| 2 | Julia Mae Mendoza | 23 | Caloocan |
| 3 | Sharielle Yanson | 21 | Marikina |
| 4 | Glyssa Leiann Perez | 24 | Bohol |
| 5 | Julie Ann Forbes | 23 | Bulacan |
| 6 | Michelle Arceo | 21 | Borongan |
| 7 | Patricia Ann Tan | 24 | Quezon |
| 8 | Kalea Lorren Pitel | 23 | Olongapo |
| 9 | Tracy Maureen Perez | 26 | Cebu City |
| 10 | Jacqueline Hammoude | 22 | Makati |
| 11 | Kayesha Clauden Chua | 26 | Albay |
| 12 | Patrisha Kamille Gutierrez | 24 | Minalin |
| 13 | Hanna Therese Cruz | 20 | Calaca |
| 14 | Kimberly Hakenson | 25 | Cavite |
| 15 | Alyssa Joreen Reyes | 21 | Lemery |
| 16 | Sharmaine Galisanao | 23 | Romblon |
| 17 | Joanna Camelle Mercado | 23 | Floridablanca |
| 18 | Ruffa Nava | 26 | Iloilo City |
| 19 | Jean Tumang | 26 | Capas |
| 20 | Ilene Astrid de Vera | 24 | Mandaue |
| 21 | Michelle Dee | 24 | Makati |
| 22 | Gerlaine Silva | 21 | Mandaluyong |
| 23 | Vanessa-Mae Walters | 19 | Makati |
| 24 | Kelley Day | 22 | Tarlac City |
| 25 | Rose Ann Ignacio | 25 | Rizal |
| 26 | Michelle Thorlund | 22 | Laguna |
| 27 | Patrixia Shirley Santos | 26 | Daraga |
| 28 | Mary Daena Resurreccion | 18 | Manila |
| 29 | Patricia Gutierrez | 24 | Taguig |
| 30 | Katrina Llegado | 21 | Taguig |
| 31 | Sheila Marie Reyes | 24 | Valenzuela |
| 32 | Jena Miliani Masero | 19 | Zambales |
| 33 | Justiene Ortega | 25 | Manila |
| 34 | Sammie Anne Legaspi | 26 | Ilocos Sur |
| 35 | Louise Theunis | 20 | Surigao del Sur |
| 36 | Ednalyn Gunio | 21 | Taguig |
| 37 | Kristi Celyn Banks | 24 | Mandaluyong |
| 38 | Aura Shaznay Tumulak | 20 | Ormoc |
| 39 | Erica Rose Madlangsakay | 20 | Los Angeles |
| 40 | Shannon Christie Kerver | 22 | Cabiao |

== Judges ==
The following served as a judge on the coronation night of Miss World Philippines 2019:

- Bryce Ramos - Actor & Commercial Model
- Nancy Go - Operations Manager, BlueWater Day Spa
- Sean Wong - National Director, Miss World Singapore & Miss World Malaysia
- Jun Omar Ebdane - Provincial Administrator, Zambales
- Sunshine Cruz - Actress
- Jeffrey Lin - CEO, GCOX Singapore
- Roselle Monteverde - Vice President and Executive Producer, Regal Films
- Maritel Nievera - President and CEO, Cabalen
- Sean Michael Afable - Hollywood Actor, Writer & Director
- Kristine Lim - Assistant Vice President for Marketing, Suyen Corporation
- Raymond Bagatsing - Actor
- Nikki Coseteng - Former Philippines' Senator
- Amaal Rezk - Chairman and CEO, Miss Eco International
- Hon. Francis Zamora - Mayor of San Juan
- Hon. Isko Moreno Domagoso - Mayor of Manila (chairman of the board)
