= Reinado Internacional de la Ganadería =

Reinado de la Ganadería
- Formation: 2008; 18 years ago
- Type: Beauty pageant
- Headquarters: Montería
- Location: Colombia
- Official language: Spanish
- Website: Fería de la Ganadería

Reinado Internacional de la Ganadería (in English: International Livestock Queen) is a women's beauty pageant held annually since 2008, as part of the Livestock Fair of Córdoba — one of the largest in Latin America. Contestants face practical tests such as bovine insemination and cow milking, in addition to parading in traditional and evening attire. Beauty accounts for 30% of the final score, while agricultural knowledge also represents 30%, followed by general culture (20%), charisma (10%), and commitment (10%). In Montería, the contest finale is marked by parades and festivities that draw large crowds, along with live television coverage. Brazil leads in titles, having won five times. The current winner, a 21-year-old Colombian named Eini González, holds the crown.

== Titleholders ==
The list includes also the virreinas:

Year	Ed	Winner	Country	Age	1st runner-up	Country	Venue	Num.	Ref.
2008	1st	Blanca Cristina Aljibes Gallardo	Venezuela	20	Sislaine "Cissa" Stolariki	Brazil	Montería, Colombia	06	
2009	2nd	Joanna de los Ángeles Parra Córdova	United States	22	Diana Margarita Silva Londoño	Colombia	Montería, Colombia	08	
2010	3rd	María Astrid de la Espriella Simanca	Colombia	23	Katerine Ramírez Rosarío	Dominican Republic	Montería, Colombia	10	
2011	4th	Mariana Isabel Loranca Moya	Costa Rica	20	Catherine Cybulkiewick Pugliese	Venezuela	Montería, Colombia	11	
2012	5th	Mónica Gabriela Armas Morán	Ecuador	22	Maria José Brito Marcano	Venezuela	Montería, Colombia	11	
2013	6th	Gabrielle Vilela de Souza	Brazil	21	Karina Ramos Leitón	Costa Rica	Montería, Colombia	11	
2014	7th	Taynara Santana Gargantini	Brazil	24	Kelin Poldy Rivera Kroll	Peru	Montería, Colombia	10	
2015	8th	Janis Alicia Baluarte Roncelas	Peru	20	Mónica Zamora Chavarría	Costa Rica	Montería, Colombia	11	
2016	9th	Kelly Ávila Mora	Costa Rica	18	Ana Isabel Cochez Díaz	Panama	Montería, Colombia	11	
2017	10th	Genésis Andréa Quintero	Colombia	25	Gioconda Florián Mory	Peru	Montería, Colombia	12	
2018	11th	Sandra Lucía Bohórquez Ruiz	Colombia	24	Amanda Brenner Rodrigues	Brazil	Montería, Colombia	12	
2019	12th	Joanna Albernaz de Camargo	Brazil	22	María Paula Fernández Cedeño	Ecuador	Montería, Colombia	10	
2023	13th	Adriana Paola Müller González	Dominican Republic	26	Isnaida Compère	Haiti	Montería, Colombia	14	
2024	14th	Jamille Victoria Beretta Santos	Brazil	21	Melissa Altagracia González Durán	Dominican Republic	Montería, Colombia	09	
2025	15th	Thaís Vitória Zanatta	Brazil	23	Liz Dayana Núñez de la Rosa	Colombia	Montería, Colombia	10	
2026	16th	Eini González	Colombia	21	Celeste Isabel Díaz Montenegro	Panama	Montería, Colombia	07	

- No pageant held during the COVID-19 pandemic between 2020 and 2022.

=== By Country ===
Titles	Country	Winning years
5	Brazil	2013, 2014, 2019, 2024, 2025
4	Colombia	2010, 2017, 2018, 2026
2	Costa Rica	2011, 2016
1	Dominican Republic	2023
1	Peru	2015
1	Ecuador	2012
1	(United States) USA	2009
1	Venezuela	2008

=== By Continent ===
Titles	Continent	Last Country
12	South America	Colombia (2026)
3	Central America	Dominican Republic (2023)
1	North America	(United States) USA (2009)

=== Ranking ===
Position	Country	1st place, gold medalist(s)	2nd place, silver medalist(s)	3rd place, bronze medalist(s)	FL	Total
1st	Brazil	5	2	1		8
2nd	Colombia	4	2	1	2	9
3rd	Costa Rica	2	2	1	1	6
4th	Dominican Republic	1	2		2	5
5th	Peru	1	2		1	4
5th	Venezuela	1	2		1	4
6th	Ecuador	1	1			2
7th	(United States) USA	1				1
8th	Panama		2		1	3
9th	Haiti		1			1
10th	Mexico			1		1
10th	Uruguay			1		1
11th	Argentina				2	2
12th	Bolivia				1	1
13th	Spain					
13th	Guatemala					
13th	Puerto Rico					

== Other informations ==
- The youngest winner so far is Kelly Ávila Mora, from Costa Rica in 2016 with 18 years old.
  - The oldest one is Adriana Müller González (2023), at 26 years old.
- The contest reached the highest number of candidates competing for the title in 2023, with 14.
  - The first edition had the smallest participation of countries, with only 6.
- Due to the pandemic, the 2019 winner from Brazil, Joanna Camargo, held the crown for the longest time: 3 years, 11 months and 24 days.
  - Before her, those elected in 2012 and 2017, Mónica Armas and Génesis Quintero held the longest time, with 1 year and 6 days.
- Spain was the only country – outside America continent – to participate in the competition, in 2025.
  - Curiously, the contestant Karine Stella Silva Cardoso was born in Brazil.
- Only Colombia has participated in all editions of the contest, since its debut in 2008.
  - Behind Colombia are Brazil and the Dominican Republic, with only 1 absence each: the first in 2016 and the second in 2013.
- Blanca Aljibes Gallardo (2008) was the 2nd runner-up at Miss Venezuela 2011. She represented her country at Miss International 2012 and was Top15.
- Gabrielle Vilela (2013) represented her country at Miss World 2017 and placed as one of the Top40.
  - She also represented Brazil at Miss Grand International 2018, being Top20; and was the 1st runner-up at Reina Hispanoamericana 2019.
- Taynara Gargantini (2014) placed as 3rd runner-up at Miss United Continents 2016 representing Brazil.
  - She also represented her country the year before at Miss Panamerican International 2015 in USA.
- Kelly Ávila Mora (2016) represented Costa Rica at the online competition of Miss Earth 2020, placing on Top20.
- Genésis Quintero (2017) was one of the Top20 at Miss Grand International 2019.
- The 1st runner-up at the 2014 edition, Kelin Rivera Kroll won World Miss University in 2016.
  - She later placed as 2nd runner-up at Miss Eco International 2018 and Top10 at Miss Universe 2019.
- Isnaida Compère, 1st runner-up at the 14th edition, represented Haiti at Miss Grand International 2023.
