= Cyrille Payumo =

Filipino model, beauty pageant titleholder

- Born: Porac, Philippines
- Beauty pageant titleholder
- Title: Mutya Pilipinas Tourism International 2019; Miss Tourism International 2019; Mutya ng Pilipinas World Top Model 2022; The Miss Philippines Charm 2025
- Major competitions: Mutya Pilipinas 2019; (Mutya Pilipinas Tourism International 2019; Assumed); Miss Tourism International 2019; (Winner); Binibining Pilipinas 2022; (Unplaced); World Top Model 2022; (Unplaced); Miss Universe Philippines 2024; (Top 10); Miss Charm 2025; (Top 20); (Best National Costume)

Cyrille Payumo (Tagalog: [/siˈril doˈmiŋges paˈjumo/]) is a Filipino model and beauty pageant titleholder who won Miss Tourism International 2019. She also represented the Philippines at the Miss Charm 2025 pageant in Vietnam where she finished in the top 20.

Payumo was first runner-up at Mutya Pilipinas 2019, before assuming the vacated Mutya Pilipinas Tourism International 2019 title. In 2022, she entered Binibining Pilipinas 2022 and was appointed as Mutya ng Pilipinas World Top Model 2022. In 2024, she won Miss Universe Philippines Pampanga 2024, allowing her to represent Pampanga at Miss Universe Philippines 2024 where she finished in the top 10. She was then later appointed as the country’s representative to Miss Charm 2025 where she finished in the top 20.

== Pageantry ==
=== Mutya Pilipinas 2019 ===
Payumo competed at Mutya Pilipinas 2019 representing Pampanga, and was first runner-up.

Payumo later assumed Tyra Goldman's Mutya Pilipinas Tourism International 2019 title after a new rule from the Miss Tourism International Organization prohibited dual-citizenship.

=== Miss Tourism International 2019 ===
As Mutya Pilipinas Tourism International 2019, Payumo represented the Philippines and won Miss Tourism International 2019, in Petaling Jaya, Malaysia. Payumo won the Best in National Costume wearing an ensemble by Rich Sabinian entitled KKK (Kabayanihan, Kababaihan, Kapayapaan), which was made in collaboration with Angeles City Jail inmates. During the coronation night, Payumo wore a peacock-inspired evening gown designed by Benj Leguiab IV.

Payumo was crowned by outgoing titleholder, Astari Vernideani of Indonesia. She became the fifth Filipino to win the title after Jan-jannie Loudette Alipo-on's victory in 2017.

=== Binibining Pilipinas 2022 ===
On April 22, 2022, Payumo was announced as one of the 40 contestants Binibining Pilipinas 2022 where she represented Porac, Pampanga. During the National Costume competition, Payumo wore a costume designed by Sabinian inspired and created by the Aeta Magantsi tribe of Porac. Payumo was unplaced in the competition.

=== World Top Model 2022 ===
On November 28, 2022, Payumo was appointed as Mutya ng Pilipinas World Top Model.

Payumo represented the Philippines at the World Top Model competition in Budapest.

=== Miss Universe Philippines Pampanga 2024 ===
Payumo represented Porac and won Miss Universe Philippines Pampanga 2024, on January 19, 2024, in Mabalacat, Pampanga. She also received the awards for Miss Photogenic, Best in Long Gown, and a sponsor award.

=== Miss Universe Philippines 2024 ===
Payumo competed at Miss Universe Philippines 2024 representing Pampanga's and reached the top 10. She was then later appointed as The Miss Philippines Charm 2025 in a separate ceremony shortly after the conclusion of the event.

=== Miss Charm 2025 ===
Payumo represented the Philippines at Miss Charm 2025 in Ho Chi Minh City, Vietnam, where she won the Best National Costume award and reached the top 20.

Awards and achievements
Preceded by Kayla Jean Carter (Northern California)	Miss Charm Philippines; 2025	Succeeded by Apriel Smith (Cebu City)
Preceded by Astari Indah Vernideani	Miss Tourism International; 2019	Succeeded by Maria Balicki Vinharski
Preceded by Tyra Rae Goldman (Nevada) (Dethroned)	Mutya ng Pilipinas Tourism International (Assumed); 2019	Succeeded by Jeanette Reyes (Camarines Sur)
Preceded by Mary Justine Teng (Muntinlupa)	Mutya ng Pilipinas; 1st Runner-up; 2019	Succeeded by None
