= Mutya Pilipinas 2019 =

- Date: 18 August 2019
- Presenters: Matteo Guidicelli; Ganiel Krishnan; Ariana Acosta
- Venue: Mall of Asia Arena, Pasay
- Broadcaster: ABS-CBN
- Entrants: 40
- Placements: 20
- Winner: Klyza Ferrando Castro; Davao del Sur
- Congeniality: Maricres Castro; Muntinlupa
- Photogenic: Justerinnie Santos; Bulakan

Mutya Pilipinas 2019 was the 51st Mutya Pilipinas pageant, (formerly known as Mutya ng Pilipinas) under the new leadership of Cory Quirino. It was held at the Mall of Asia Arena in Pasay, Metro Manila, Philippines, on August 18, 2019.

At the end of the event, Sharifa Akeel crowned Klyza Castro as Mutya Pilipinas Asia Pacific International 2019. Including her crowned are the new court of winners: April May Short was crowned as Mutya Pilipinas World Top Model 2019, Tyra Goldman was crowned as Mutya Pilipinas Tourism International 2019, and Louise Janica An was crowned as Mutya Pilipinas Overseas Communities 2019. Cyrille Payumo was named First Runner-Up, and Maxinne Nicole Rangel was named Second Runner-Up.

Later that year, Tyra Goldman was replaced by Cyrille Payumo as the representative of the Philippines to the Miss Tourism International 2019 pageant due to her dual citizenship. Goldman eventually competed internationally at the Top Model of the World contest in January the following year.

== Results ==
=== Placements ===
Color keys

- The contestant won in an international pageant.
- The contestant was a semi-finalist in an international pageant.

Placement	Contestant	International placement
Mutya Pilipinas Asia Pacific International 2019	#23 – Klyza Castro	Top 25 – Miss Asia Pacific International 2019
Mutya Pilipinas World Top Model 2019	#20 – April May Short	Top 12 – World Top Model 2019
Mutya Pilipinas Tourism International 2019	#17 – Tyra Rae Goldman	Top 15 – Top Model of the World 2019
Mutya Pilipinas Overseas Communities 2019	#8 – Louise Janica An	
1st Runner-Up	#19 – Cyrille Payumo	Winner – Miss Tourism International 2019
2nd Runner-Up	#32 – Maxinne Rangel §	
Top 12	#9 – Andrea Fe Gomez; #11 – Keinth Jensen Petrasanta; #21 – Ysabel Napiza; #26 – Karla Claudine Lasquite; #29 – Dionne Sade Nicha; #34 – Lesley Anne Ticaro	
Top 20	#1 – Jigg Kirsty Ang; #4 – Mariah Gelina Lequin; #6 – Ella Cayabyab; #13 – Andrea Acibo; #33 – Maria Angelica Pantaliano; #35 – Camille Maha Marie Fabro; #36 – Irish Silades; #37 – Nina Angeli Bernedo	

§ – People's Choice (Automatic Top 12)

=== Special awards ===
Award	Contestant
Darling of the Press	#9 Baguio − Andrea Fe Gomez; #32 Padre Garcia – Maxinne Nicole Rangel (tie)
Miss Photogenic	#39 Bulakan, Bulacan – Lady Justerinnie Santos
Miss Friendship	#31 Alabang, Muntinlupa – Maricres Castro
Best in Talent	#36 Malinao, Albay – Irish Silades
People's Choice Award	#32 Padre Garcia – Maxinne Nicole Rangel
Best in Swimsuit	#32 Padre Garcia – Maxinne Nicole Rangel
Best in Evening Gown	#19 Pampanga – Cyrille Payumo (Designer: Jolaida Niccolai)
Best in Terno	#19 Pampanga – Cyrille Payumo (Designer: Rich Sabinian)
Best Fashion Designer	#20 Zamboanga City – April May Short (Designer: Dr Jerome Navarro Felizo)
Jesi Mendez Salon Ambassador	#13 Batangas City – Andrea Acibo
Miss GIBI	#7 Taguig – Hanna Jessica Villa
Miss Paddocks	#19 Pampanga – Cyrille Payumo
Miss EB Advance	#17 Nevada – Tyra Rae Goldman
Fortune Life Empowered Woman	#39 Bulakan – Lady Justerinnie Santos
Miss CWC	#9 Baguio – Andrea Fe Gomez
Miss Echolac	#32 Padre Garcia – Maxinne Nicole Rangel
Miss Pretty Looks	#22 Australia – Savannah Rosemary Catayas
Miss Mestiza	#33 Mandaue – Maria Angelica Pantaliano
Miss Organique	#20 Zamboanga City – April May Short
Miss Hyundai	#39 Bulakan – Lady Justerinnie Santos
Miss Sheridan	#33 Mandaue – Maria Angelica Pantaliano
Miss Cebu Landmasters	#19 Pampanga – Cyrille Payumo
Miss Camera Club of the Philippines	#9 Baguio – Andrea Fe Gomez
Miss Ascott	#1 Catanduanes – Jigg Kirsty Ang
Miss Prime Group of Companies	#19 Pampanga – Cyrille Payumo

== Contestants ==
40 contestants competed for the four titles.

No.	Contestant	Age	Hometown
1	Jigg Kirsty Ang	24	Catanduanes
2	Alyana Bettina Penales	24	Bacacay
3	Jasmine Marie Eaton	19	Tacloban
4	Mariah Gelina Lequin	20	Bogo
5	Amber de los Reyes	19	Canada
6	Ella Cayabyab	18	Quezon
7	Hanna Jessica Villa	20	Taguig
8	Louise Janica An	24	California
9	Andrea Fe Gomez	21	Baguio
10	Jenieva Basultin	19	Barotac Viejo
11	Keinth Jensen Petrasanta	20	Laguna
12	Camille Joy Ang	19	Cavite
13	Andrea Acibo	19	Batangas City
14	Karmina Luiza Grady	19	Arizona
15	Sandra Jele	18	Tagbilaran
16	Maria Isabel Alves	22	Parañaque
17	Tyra Rae Goldman	18	Nevada
18	Joi Rufina Hunter	18	Illinois
19	Cyrille Payumo	22	Pampanga
20	April May Short	25	Zamboanga City
21	Ysabel Napiza	18	New Jersey
22	Savannah Rosemary Catayas	22	Australia
23	Klyza Castro	19	Davao City
24	Christene Longakit	20	Quezon City
25	Eiffel Janell Rosalita	23	Santa Maria
26	Karla Claudine Lasquite	25	Cebu City
27	Layla Yousif Adriatico	23	Bahrain
28	Iana Faye Marie Olea	20	Davao Oriental
29	Dionne Sade Nicha	23	Muntinlupa
30	Jenny Kim Agasid	18	Parañaque
31	Maricres Castro	26	Muntinlupa
32	Maxinne Nicole Rangel	21	Padre Garcia
33	Maria Angelica Pantaliano	20	Mandaue
34	Lesley Anne Ticaro	25	Davao del Norte
35	Camille Maha Marie Fabro	18	United Arab Emirates
36	Irish Silades	19	Malinao
37	Nina Angeli Bernedo	19	Cagayan de Oro
38	Jaica Zacate	21	Pangasinan
39	Lady Justerinnie Santos	21	Bulakan
40	Stephanie Monique Villavicencio	18	Iloilo City
