= Isabel Luche =

Filipina beauty queen (born 1999)

Isabel Dalag Luche (born October 18, 1999) is a Filipina beauty queen, digital creator, and social media influencer from Mandaue City, Cebu, Philippines. She is known for her strong presence on TikTok, her participation in Miss Universe Philippines 2022, and her academic achievements.

== Biography ==
Luche is a well-known social media personality. On TikTok, she has amassed millions of followers, with reports indicating over 1.7 million followers as of 2022. Her content often centers around beauty, lifestyle, and personal empowerment. In 2024, she was highlighted by Journal News Online as a “TikTok Star of the Day” with 2.2 million followers reported at that time.

Luche competed in Miss Universe Philippines 2022, representing Mandaue City. During the competition, she won the Headshot Challenge, which was decided through a combination of fan voting and judges’ scores. She also received a special title of Miss Jewelmer during the preliminary events.
