= The Filipino Festival =

Culture event in the Philippines

- Date: October 2023
- Location: Metro Manila, Philippines
- Type: Festival
- Theme: Filipino culture
- Organized by: Empire Philippines

The Filipino Festival is a cultural and entertainment event organized Empire Philippines held in October 2023.

== Background ==
Empire Philippines launched in August 2023, The Filipino Festival featuring events for songwriters, filmmakers, and fashion designers. It also showcased Filipino products as well as performances from various local singers.

== Events ==
The Filipino Music Fest – a concert at the Estancia Mall in Pasig on October 12. It featured Nina, I Belong to the Zoo and Driven 2.0. It also saw the exhibition of thee finalist songs of a competition namely "Dito pa rin Ako" by Daniel Temporada, "Higit pa sa Ganda" by Maria Angelica Dayao, and "My Superstar" by Edmund Perlas and C-Tru.

The Filipino Food Festival – features Filipino cuisine

The Filipino Arts and Crafts Festival – features Filipino-made products.

The Filipino Fashion Fest – a design competition was launched for fashion designers whose designs were exhibited at the organizer's runway. The winners were promised an opportunity to work with the Miss Universe Philippines, The Miss Philippines, and Mister Pilipinas Worldwide pageants.

The Filipino Film Fest – a short film film festival. Ten finalist were selected for screening at the Estancia Mall in Pasig on October 18.

Mister Pilipinas Worldwide and The Miss Philippines – Pageants serving as the final event of The Filipino Festival. The inaugural pageants were held at the Mall of Asia Arena in Pasay on October 24, 2023.
