= Katrina Llegado =

Filipino beauty pageant titleholder

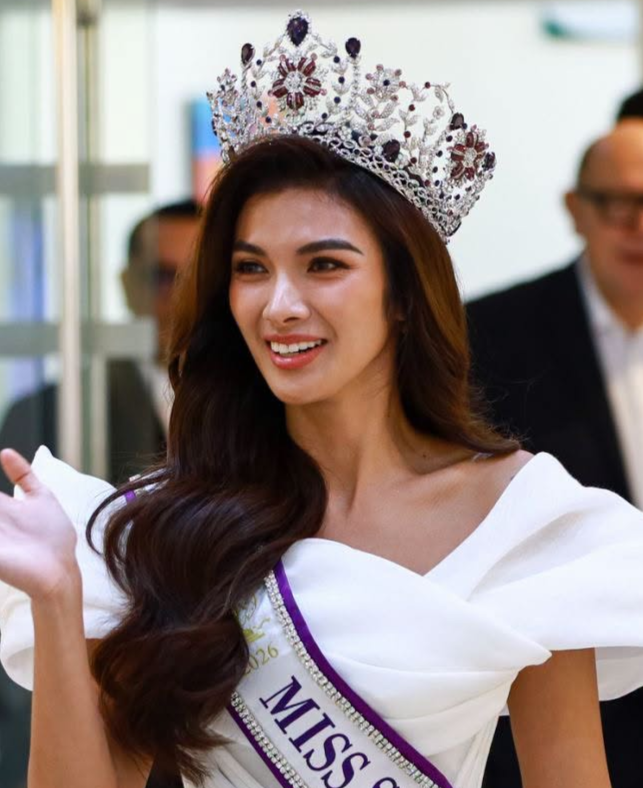
- Llegado in 2026
- Born: Ma. Katrina Llegado; November 9, 1997 (age 28); Taguig, Philippines
- Education: De La Salle University-Manila (BS)
- Height: 5 ft 7 in (170 cm)
- Beauty pageant titleholder
- Title: Reina Hispanoamericana Filipinas 2019; The Miss Philippines Supranational 2026; Miss Supranational 2026
- Major competitions: Miss World Philippines 2019; (Winner – Reina Hispanoamericana Filipinas 2019); Reina Hispanoamericana 2019; (5th Runner-Up); Miss Universe Philippines 2022; (2nd Runner-Up); Miss Universe Philippines 2025; (Top 6); Miss Supranational 2026; (Winner)
- Military career
- Allegiance: Philippines
- Branch: Philippine Air Force
- Service years: 2023–present
- Unit: Philippine Air Force Reserve Command

Ma. Katrina Llegado (Tagalog: [maˈɾi.a kaˈtɾina ljeˈɣado]; born November 8, 1997) is a Filipino beauty pageant titleholder who won Miss Supranational 2026. She is the second Filipina to win the Miss Supranational title.

Llegado previously competed at Miss World Philippines 2019, where she was designated as the Philippine representative to Reina Hispanoamericana 2019, where she would become the fifth runner-up. She later competed at Miss Universe Philippines in 2022 and 2025, reaching the finals in both editions. Following her second run, The Miss Philippines organization appointed her as the Philippine delegate to Miss Supranational 2026, where she won.

Together with Arianne Amante, Llegado is a co-founder of the Philippine cosmetics brand Clocheflame.

== Early life and career ==
Ma. Katrina Llegado was born on November 9, 1997, in Taguig, Philippines. Her grandfather served in the Armed Forces of the Philippines, whom she has cited as an inspiration for her advocacy work and later, her entry into the military. She studied financial management at the Manila campus of De La Salle University and graduated cum laude in 2018. She has worked as a marketing and public relations consultant for the city government of Taguig and held analytical and research positions at Citibank Philippines and the Bangko Sentral ng Pilipinas.

In 2023, she graduated from the reserve force of the Philippine Air Force to become a reservist of the unit.

== Pageantry ==
Llegado entered pageantry in 2018, when she competed in the Mutya ng Taguig pageant as the candidate for Bagumbayan, Taguig, and finished in the top five. Since her initial stint, she has trained with the beauty camp Aces and Queens.

=== 2019: Reina Hispanoamericana ===
On September 15, 2019, Llegado represented Taguig at Miss World Philippines 2019, her first national competition. In events leading up to the finals, she won three special awards, including Miss Photogenic and Best in Evening Gown. At the end of the event, she won the supplemental title Reina Hispanoamerica Filipinas 2019, receiving the title from outgoing titleholder Alyssa Mulach.

Llegado represented the Philippines at Reina Hispanoamericana 2019 and was fifth runner-up.

=== Miss Universe Philippines 2022 ===
In February 2022, the Miss Universe Philippines organization listed Llegado as one of the 50 applicants shortlisted to compete in the 2022 edition. In the qualifying challenges for the edition, she placed first in the swimsuit competition. During the preliminary competition, she was awarded one special award.

Llegado worked with longtime collaborator Pablo Mendez III for her evening gowns for the competition. Working with the Taguig Waterlily Livelihood Center, Mendez also designed a Filipiniana made of dried water lilies for the national costume competition.

During the finals, she was named as a semifinalist and then progressed to the final round. At the final question-and-answer round, she was asked to share one thing she could teach to Filipinos. In her response, she discussed the importance of self-love and self-improvement and its role in becoming a "transformed women".

At the end of the event, she was named as the second runner-up to Celeste Cortesi of Pasay.

=== Miss Universe Philippines 2025 ===
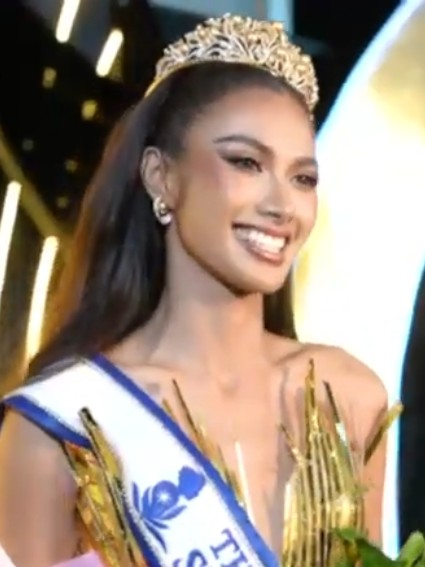
Llegado following the finals of Miss Universe Philippines 2025.

On February 7, 2025, the accredited partner of Taguig for the Miss Universe Philippines pageant appointed Llegado as its delegate to the 2025 edition.

During the preliminary competition, she was awarded one special award, which she shared with Yllana Aduana of Siniloan and Ahtisa Manalo of Quezon. Llegado worked with Mendez again for her evening gowns. Brian Diego designed her entry for the national costume competition, which depicted the mythological deity Amihan and paid tribute to the country's emerging drag culture.

Like in her previous stint, she advanced to the semifinals and progressed to the final round. At the final question-and-answer round, she was asked how she can help empower women to participate in politics. In her response, she emphasized gender equality and the roles of women as trailblazers and leaders.

Llegado finished in the top six, with Manalo winning the pageant.

=== Miss Supranational 2026 ===
In May 2025, The Miss Philippines organization appointed Llegado as The Miss Philippines Supranational, allowing her to represent the Philippines at Miss Supranational 2026.

Llegado worked with a number of designers in her bid for the title, including Ryan Ablaza Uson and Manny Halasan. Mendez designed her gown for the preliminary competition while Rian Fernandez designed her evening gown for the finals. Her entry to the national costume show, inspired by the gumamela, was designed by Mich Viray.

In pre-pageant events, she was a semifinalist for two fast-track events. During the finals, she advanced to the top 24, and then the top 12.

In the first round of the question-and-answer segment, she was asked about her plans if given the chance to "create change". She described herself as a "visionary leader" and expressed her aspiration to be a "shining example" to every woman that "true greatness starts when limit ends".

In the second round, she was asked to share the moment she became the woman "she was meant to be" rather than the one she expected. She shared that she always believed that people "should never fit into a mold" and that they are "perfectly imperfect". She recalled her struggles with achieving perfection and her sense of belongingness in Miss Supranational.

At the end of the event, she was named the winner, receiving the title from her predecessor, Eduarda Braum of Brazil, becoming the second Filipina to win the title after Mutya Johanna Datul in 2013, and the first titleholder to be crowned with the Fioletowa Crown. Her win tied the Philippines with India for the most titles won in the pageant's history.

== Other ventures ==
In 2021, Llegado co-founded Philippine cosmetics brand Clocheflame with Arianne Amante, and is the chief financial officer. The brand has partnered with Project Pearls to support the latter organization's livelihood programs for women in low-income areas in Tondo, Manila.

== Personal life ==
Llegado has been in a relationship with James Vilela Dizon since 2014.

Awards and achievements
Preceded by Eduarda Braum (Brazil)	Miss Supranational; 2026	Incumbent
Preceded by Tarah Valencia (Baguio)	Miss Supranational Philippines; 2026	Succeeded by Allyson Hetland (Pampanga)
Preceded by Steffi Aberasturi (Cebu)	Miss Universe Philippines; 2nd Runner-Up; 2022	Succeeded by Angelique Manto (Pampanga)
Preceded by Lisseth Naranjo	Reina Hispanoamericana; 5th Runner-Up; 2019	Succeeded by Theresa Agonia
Preceded by Alyssa Muhlach (Pasig)	Reina Hispanoamericana Filipinas; 2019	Succeeded by Emmanuelle Vera (Taguig)
