= Alethea Ambrosio =

Filipino model and beauty pageant titleholder (born 2002)

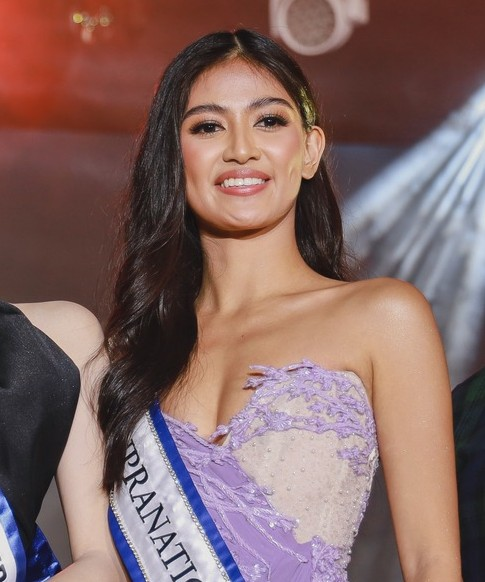
- Ambrosio in 2024
- Born: Alethea Rodriguez Ambrosio; July 17, 2002 (age 24); San Rafael, Bulacan, Philippines
- Education: De La Salle University
- Occupation: Model
- Beauty pageant titleholder
- Title: The Miss Philippines 2023; Miss Supranational Philippines 2024; Miss Supranational Asia and Oceania 2024
- Major competitions: The Miss Philippines 2023; (Winner); Miss Supranational 2024; (Top 12); (Miss Supranational Asia and Oceania)

Alethea Rodriguez Ambrosio (born July 17, 2002) is a Filipino model and beauty pageant titleholder who was crowned as The Miss Philippines 2023 appointed as Miss Supranational Philippines 2024.

Ambrosio is noted to have won The Miss Philippines 2023 pageant by speaking in Filipino in the final word round. She represented the Philippines at the Miss Supranational 2024 pageant where she finished in the top 12 and was crowned Miss Supranational Asia and Oceania.

== Early life and education ==
Ambrosio was born on July 17, 2002, in San Rafael, Bulacan, to Adrian Ambrosio and Shirley Rodriguez. She is currently studying a bachelor's degree in Economics at the De La Salle University in Malate, Manila.

== Pageantry ==
=== Local and regional pageants ===
Ambrosio began pageantry when she was first crowned Miss Rotary Club of Taguig West and competed in the Miss Rotary 2023 pageant where she placed in the top 10.

=== The Miss Philippines 2023 ===
Ambrosio competed in her first major pageant at The Miss Philippines 2023 pageant held at the SM Mall of Asia Arena on October 24, 2023. In the final round of the pageant, she answered her question in Filipino of which she received praise for her answer and nods of approval from the judges. Ambrosio went on to win the event at the end of the night and was crowned The Miss Philippines 2023, and was later crowned as Miss Supranational Philippines 2024 at an appointment ceremony on February 18, 2024.

=== Miss Supranational 2024 ===
Ambrosio represented the Philippines and competed against 67 candidates from their respective countries/territories in the Miss Supranational 2024 pageant at Nowy Sącz, Poland. She was a semi-finalist in the Supra Model of the Year challenge placing in the top 11 of the pre-pageant event. On the coronation night on July 6, 2024, Ambrosio advanced to the top 12 question and answer portion where all 12 contestants were asked to answer, "Why they should be the next brand ambassador of the Miss Supranational organization" in 20 seconds. She responded;

"In my country where beauty queens are often applauded for speaking in English, I won my national title using Filipino, our national language. As a cultural torch bearer, I seek to lead the path in forging cross-cultural understanding among my sisters as your next Miss Supranational ambassadress."

Ambrosio finished in the top 12 and was crowned Miss Supranational Asia and Oceania, this title is awarded to the highest-ranking representative from the continent who did not make it into the top five. At the end of the night, Harashta Haifa Zahra of Indonesia won the event.

Awards and achievements
Preceded by (India) Pragnya Ayyagari	Miss Supranational Asia; 2024	Succeeded by (Indonesia) Firsta Yufi
Preceded by Pauline Amelinckx (Bohol)	Miss Supranational Philippines; 2024	Succeeded by Tarah Valencia (Baguio)
Preceded by Pauline Amelinckx (Bohol)	The Miss Philippines; 2023	Incumbent
