= Pauline Amelinckx =

Filipino beauty pageant titleholder

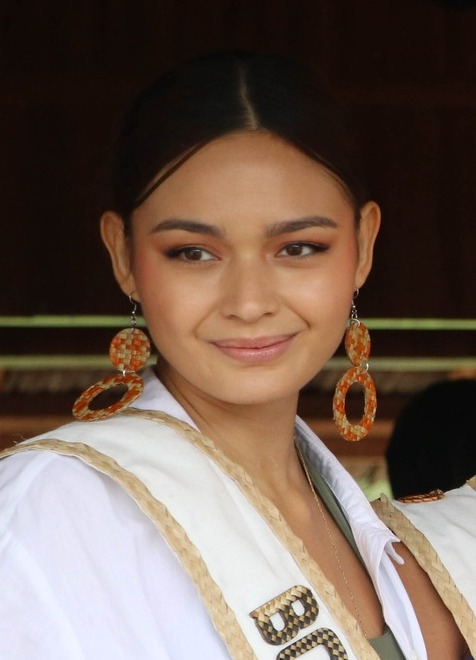
- Amelinckx in 2023
- Born: Pauline Cucharo Amelinckx; August 26, 1995 (age 31); Tubigon, Bohol, Philippines
- Education: Cebu Doctors' University (BA)
- Height: 1.73 m (5 ft 8 in)
- Beauty pageant titleholder
- Title: Mutya ng Pilipinas Global Beauty Queen 2018; Miss Supranational Philippines 2023; The Miss Philippines 2023
- Major competitions: Mutya ng Pilipinas 2018; (Winner – Mutya ng Pilipinas Global Beauty Queen 2018); Miss Universe Philippines 2020; (3rd Runner-up); Miss Universe Philippines 2022; (Top 3 – Miss Universe Philippines Charity 2022); Miss Universe Philippines 2023; (Top 5); Miss Supranational 2023; (1st Runner-up)

Pauline Cucharo Amelinckx (Tagalog: [paʊˈlin kuˈtʃaɾɔ ˌameˈliŋks]; born August 26, 1995) is a Filipina beauty pageant titleholder who was crowned Miss Supranational Philippines 2023. She represented the Philippines at the Miss Supranational 2023 competition and ended as first runner-up. She was later appointed as the first The Miss Philippines titleholder.

Amelinckx has competed at the Miss Universe Philippines pageant three times and was appointed as Miss Supranational Philippines following her third attempt, in 2023. She was previously crowned Miss Bohol 2017, and later, Mutya ng Pilipinas Global Beauty Queen 2018.

Identifying herself as a "self-love advocate", Amelinckx advocates for body positivity, mental health awareness, and marine conservation.

== Early life and education ==
Amelinckx was born on August 26, 1995, in Tubigon, Bohol, to a Filipino mother and a Flemish father. She lived in Antwerp, Belgium, for ten years, from the age of two to twelve, when she returned to the Philippines. She studied international studies and majored in European studies at the Cebu Doctors' University in Mandaue, Cebu, where she graduated with a Bachelor of Arts in 2017.

== Pageantry ==
=== Local and regional pageants ===
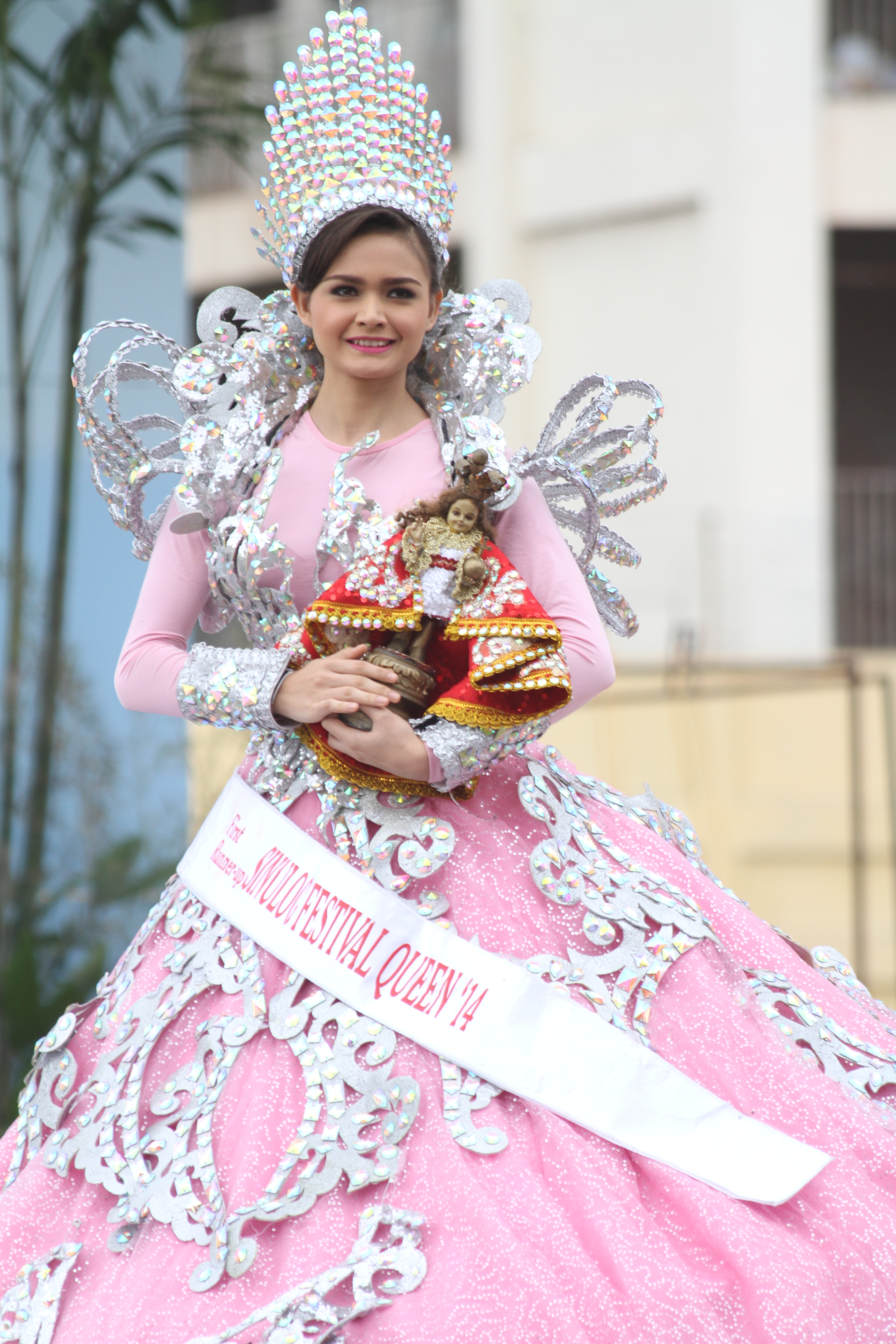
Amelinckx as the 2014 Sinulog Festival Queen

In 2014, Amelinckx represented Tribu Himag-ulaw from Placer, Masbate, at the Sinulog Festival Queen pageant and finished as first runner-up. In addition to her placement, she also won four special awards—Best in Group Performance, Miss Phoenix Petroleum, Miss Suncellular and Miss Sinulog Allphones.

On July 22, 2017, she was crowned Miss Bohol 2017 at the Bohol Wisdom School Gymnasium in Bohol, Philippines. The first runner-up in the same pageant was Gazini Ganados, who would later be crowned Miss Universe Philippines 2019.

=== Mutya ng Pilipinas 2018 ===
In 2018, Amelinckx competed at Mutya ng Pilipinas 2018, representing Bohol. In the Terno competition held on September 12, 2018, she won the Best in Terno award, as well as the Mutya ng Camera Club of the Philippines award. At the coronation night held on September 16, 2018, she was crowned Mutya ng Pilipinas Global Beauty Queen 2018. She was the Philippines' delegate to Global Beauty Queen 2018, which was cancelled due to tensions in the Middle East.

=== Miss Universe Philippines (2020, 2022) ===
Amelinckx first competed at Miss Universe Philippines 2020, representing Bohol. In the preliminary competition, she won three special awards, and on the coronation night, she won the Most Beautiful Face award. She finished third runner-up behind winner, Rabiya Mateo of Iloilo City.

Amelinckx was announced as the official candidate for Miss Universe Philippines 2022, on April 6, 2022. At the end of coronation night, she was crowned Miss Universe Philippines Charity 2022, third to winner, Celeste Cortesi.

=== Miss Universe Philippines 2023 ===
On February 18, 2023, Amelinckx was announced as one of the 40 delegates competing Miss Universe Philippines 2023. In an interview with the Philippine Entertainment Portal, Amelinckx expressed that she was "afraid that people would be... naumay sa akin [grown tired of me]", on her third attempt on the pageant, but was identified as a fan-favorite to win the competition.

In the preliminary competition held on May 10, 2023, Amelinckx won ten special awards, the most of any contestants that year. Her performance at the competition led publications to identify her as a frontrunner at the pageant.

At the coronation night, Amelinckx won five more special awards; Miss Jojo Bragais, Miss Titan Universe, Miss Enderun, Miss Smilee Apparel and Miss Avana. She advanced to the Top 5, where she, and her co-finalists, were asked "For you, what is the best that we can offer to the rest of the world? Why do you consider it so?", alluding to the Department of Tourism's new branding campaign. She answered:

The best that we offer to the world is the Filipino warmth. It is something that we feel in other countries when we see other Filipino communities. But it is something we feel even more evidently here in the Philippines. And with this slogan at heart, with this value within us, we'll be able to bring so many people together to make a meaningful change out there and show them the best the Philippines has to offer.

At the end of pageant, she finished in top five. Michelle Dee was the winner of the pageant.

=== Miss Supranational 2023 ===
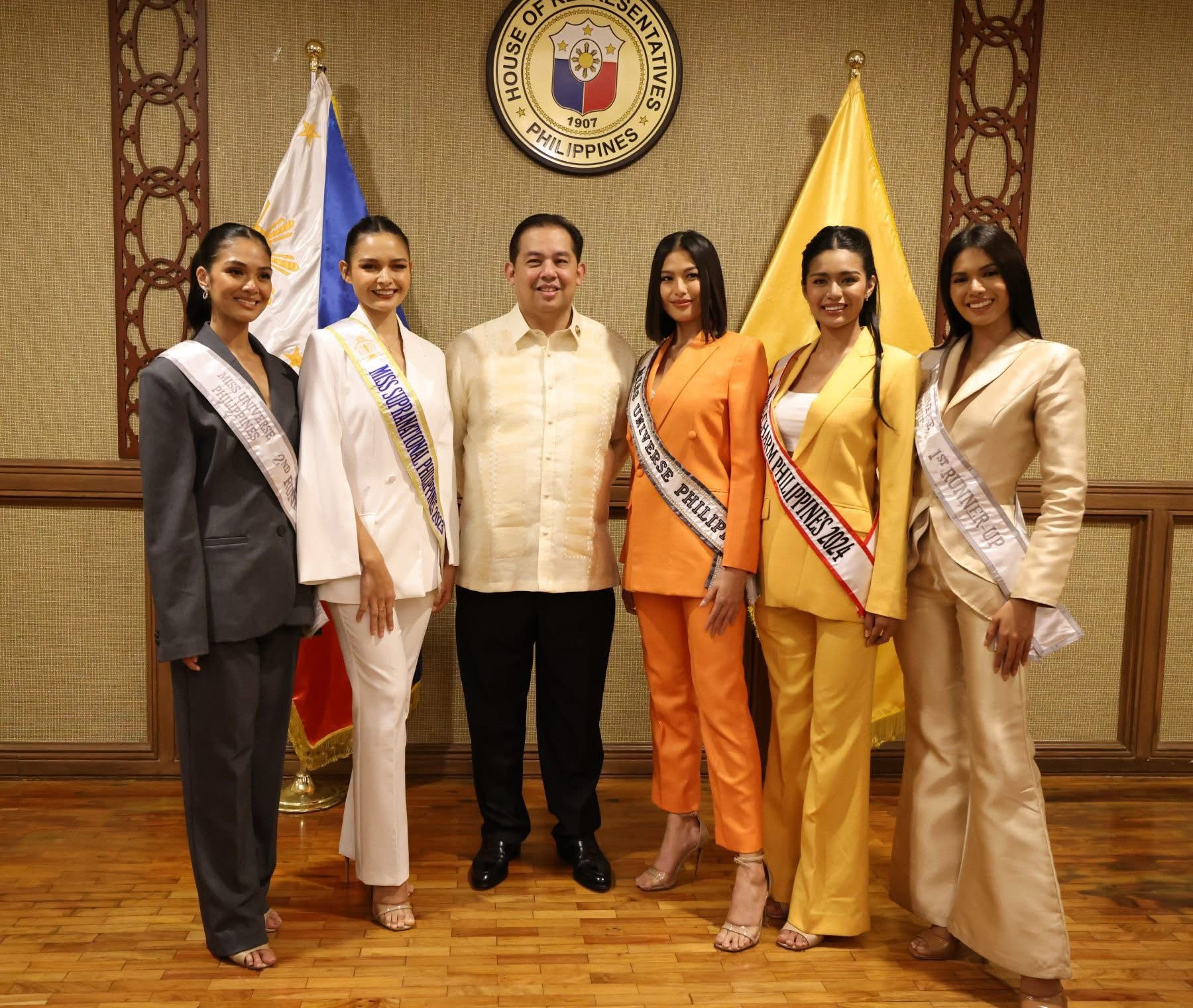
Amelinckx (second from the left) with (from left to right) Angelique Manto, Speaker of the House of Representatives Martin Romualdez, Michelle Dee, Krishnah Gravidez, and CJ Opiaza in 2023

Following Miss Universe Philippines 2023, Amelinckx was appointed Miss Supranational Philippines 2023 in a separate ceremony held at the Okada Manila, thereby making her the country's delegate to the Miss Supranational 2023 pageant. She, and Mister Supranational Philippines 2023 Johannes Rissler, departed to Poland to compete at their respective pageants, on June 26, 2023. In her introductory video for the pageant, she emphasized self-love and body positivity.

In fast-track events held prior to the pageant, Amelinckx won the third challenge of Miss Supra Influencer, giving her an opportunity to automatically advance to the Top 24; and won the first round of the Supra Chat, having competed against seven other delegates in the competition's tenth group, giving her another opportunity to advance to the semifinal of the pageant. Amelinckx would advance to the final rounds of both competitions. Dale Calanog of Inquirer praised her outfit choices in events prior to the pageant, commenting that the outfits "showcase her boldness". For the National Costume round, Amelinckx wore a "fiery red" terno matched by a red parasol. Ehrran Montoya, who designed the ensemble, described the outfit as a "modern take on the Filipinana".

The pageant was held on July 14, 2023, at the Strzelecki Park Amphitheater. Amelinckx advanced to the Top 24 via her win at the Supra Chat challenge. Amelinckx would advance to the Top 5, where she and her co-finalists were asked: "What makes for a good brand ambassador for this organization?". Drawn to answer second, Amelinckx responded:

"It would be dedication. Dedication to this journey, dedication to the people who have brought her up to this journey, and dedication of course with the organization that she'll end up working with. This is such a beautiful experience. And she has to be someone who will bring people together. Someone who knows that this is not a one-woman journey. We all have our differences, but we also realize that we have so much in common. And we are now gathered here on this stage transcending our own borders, bringing nations together."

Towards the end of the event, Amelinckx was announced as Miss Supranational 2023 First Runner-Up. Andrea Aguilera of Ecuador won the said pageant.

She received messages of congratulations from beauty queens Shamcey Supsup-Lee, Michelle Dee, Beatrice Gomez, Roberta Tamondong, and Tracy Perez. Online, her finish as a runner-up was met with dismay, with her performance being compared to that of Pia Wurtzbach and Catriona Gray. In response to the online backlash towards Aguilera's win, Amelinckx called for her supporters to find "pride and peace" with her finish.

=== The Miss Philippines ===
Following the pageant, Amelinckx traveled across Europe before returning to the Philippines, where she received a "grand homecoming" in Bohol in conjunction with the Sandugo Festival. Following the formation of the Miss Philippines pageant in August 2023, Amelinckx was appointed as the pageant's inaugural titleholder, being crowned by Shamcey Supsup-Lee and Jonas Gaffud.

Amelinckx crowned her successor Alethea Ambrosio of Bulacan, Miss Philippines, on October 24, 2023. At the event Amelinckx received the Miss Supranational Woman of Substance award from Aguilera.

== Advocacies and issues ==
Amelinckx describes herself as a "self-love advocate", having had experienced body shaming. She advocates for marine conservation, mental health awareness, and body positivity.

Since 2019, Amelinckx has been an "Ambassador of Hope" for the Yellow Boat of Hope Foundation, which aims to improve the accessibility of education to students in far-flung areas through the use of boats and other facilities. Amid the COVID-19 pandemic in the Philippines, she participated in the foundation's "Hope in a Box" initiative, which saw the distribution of coloring books and fruits in her barangay.

Amelinckx is the president of the Chocolate Hills Chapter of the Junior Chamber International Philippines.

Awards and achievements
Preceded by (Thailand) Praewwanich Ruangthong	Miss Supranational; 1st Runner-Up; 2023	Succeeded by (United States) Jenna Dykstra
Preceded by (Indonesia) Adinda Cresheilla (Vietnam) Nguyễn Huỳnh Kim Duyên	Miss Supranational; Supra Chat Winner; 2023	Succeeded by (Curaçao) Chanelle de Lau
Preceded by Inaugural	The Miss Philippines; 2023	Succeeded by Alethea Ambrosio (Bulacan)
Preceded by Alison Black (Las Piñas)	Miss Supranational Philippines; 2023	Succeeded by Alethea Ambrosio (Bulacan)
Preceded by Kim Victoria Vincent (Cavite)	Miss Universe Philippines Charity; 2022	Succeeded by Not awarded
Preceded by Inaugural	Miss Universe Philippines 3rd Runner-Up; 2020	Succeeded by Not awarded
Preceded by Sofia Marie Sibug (Albay)	Mutya ng Pilipinas Global Beauty Queen; 2018	Succeeded by Not awarded
