= Miss Supranational 2024 =

15th Miss Supranational pageant

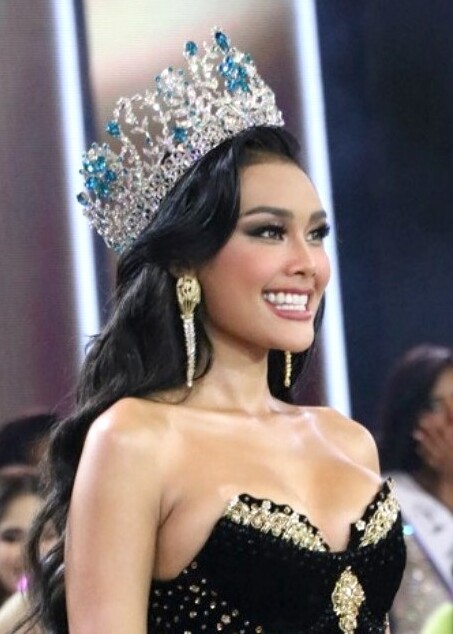
- Harashta Haifa Zahra
- Date: 6 July 2024
- Presenters: Aleksander Sikora; Katarzyna Kołeczek; Nico Panagio
- Venue: Strzelecki Park Amphitheater, Nowy Sącz, Lesser Poland, Poland
- Broadcaster: Polsat
- Entrants: 68
- Placements: 25
- Debuts: Bangladesh
- Withdrawals: Bahamas; Cambodia; Cameroon; Greece; Jamaica; Kenya; Mauritius; Mozambique; Namibia; South Korea; Togo; Turkey; Zambia; Zimbabwe
- Returns: Albania; Argentina; Aruba; Australia; Chile; Denmark; Honduras; Italy; Laos; Malta; Myanmar; New Zealand; Pakistan; Sierra Leone; United States Virgin Islands; Uruguay
- Winner: Harashta Haifa Zahra; Indonesia
- Congeniality: Samantha Jones; Panama
- Best National Costume: Rossana Fiorini; Venezuela

Miss Supranational 2024 was the 15th edition of the Miss Supranational pageant, held at the Strzelecki Park Amphitheater in Nowy Sącz, Lesser Poland, Poland, on 6 July 2024.

Andrea Aguilera of Ecuador crowned Harashta Haifa Zahra of Indonesia as her successor at the end of the event, marking the country's first victory in the history of the pageant.

== Background ==
=== Location and date ===
On 5 February 2024, the official social media channels of the Miss Supranational Organization conveyed the announcement of the 15th edition to be hosted in Lesser Poland, Poland, in July. Furthermore, on 1 March 2024, Gerhard Parzutka von Lipinski, the President of the Miss Supranational Organization, publicized that the final show is scheduled for Saturday, 6 July 2024.

=== Selection of participants ===
Contestants representing sixty-eight countries and territories have been chosen to participate in the pageant. Additionally, three contestants replaced the original winner, who was removed.

==== Replacements ====
Camilla Farnesi of Italy replaced Silvia Vacaru for an undisclosed reasons. Meghan Kenney replaced Emma May Gribble, Miss Supranational New Zealand 2024, who withdrew for personal reasons.

==== Debuts, returns, and, withdrawals ====
The edition marked the debut of Bangladesh and saw the return of Albania, Argentina, Aruba, Australia, Chile, Denmark, Equatorial Guinea, Honduras, Italy, Laos, Malta, Myanmar, New Zealand, Pakistan, Sierra Leone, the United States Virgin Islands and Uruguay. Aruba, which last competed in 2015, Italy and Pakistan in 2018. Australia, Equatorial Guinea, Honduras, Myanmar, New Zealand, and the United States Virgin Islands in 2019, Albania and Sierra Leone in 2021 and the others last competed in 2022.

Withdrawals for the event included The Bahamas, Cameroon, Kenya, Jamaica, Mauritius, Mozambique, Namibia, Turkey, and Zambia. These countries withdrew due to their organizations' failure to appoint a delegate, hold a national competition, or lost their national franchise. Additionally, Yollanda Chimbarami set to represent Zimbabwe, but withdrew for undisclosed reasons and instead participated in Miss International 2025. Chandara Chhum of Cambodia and Jeong-eun Choi of South Korea withdrew due to visa issues after participating in the Supra Chat event. Ignéfi Afi Claire of Togo was replaced by Bithja Gozo Akakpo for undisclosed reasons; however, Akakpo eventually withdrew as well.

== Results ==
=== Placements ===
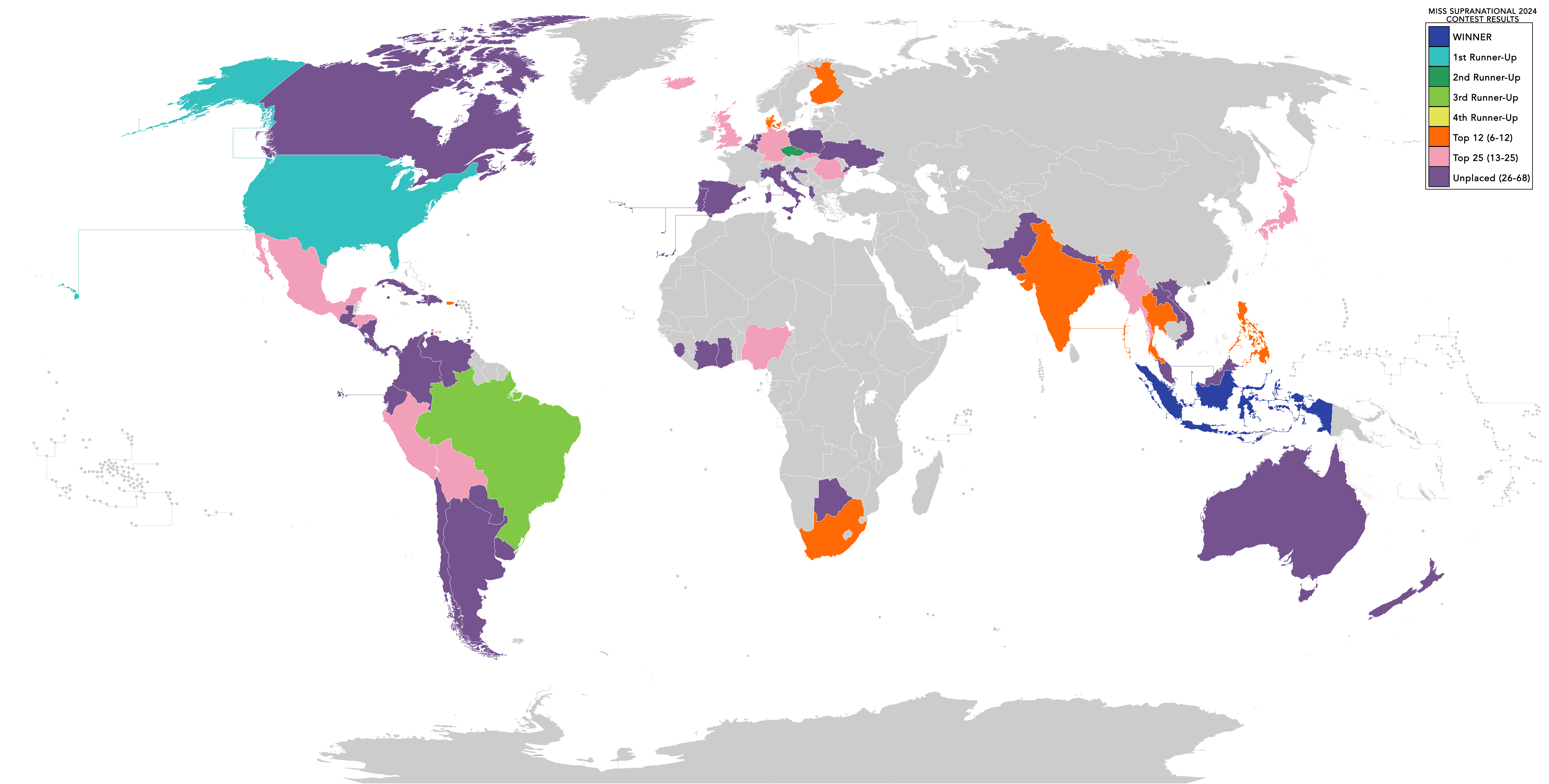
Miss Supranational 2024 participating nations and results

Placement	Contestant
Miss Supranational 2024	Indonesia – Harashta Haifa Zahra
1st Runner-Up	United States – Jenna Dykstra
2nd Runner-Up	Czech Republic – Justýna Zedníková
3rd Runner-Up	Brazil – Isadora Murta
4th Runner-Up	Curaçao – Chanelle de Lau Δ
Top 12	Denmark – Victoria Larsen ★; Finland – Aleksandra Hannusaari; India – Sonal Kukreja; Philippines – Alethea Ambrosio; Puerto Rico – Fiorella Medina; South Africa – Bryoni Govender ♡; Thailand – Kasama Suetrong
Top 25	Aruba – Rashida Schmidt; Bolivia – Estefanía Ibarra; Germany – Luisa Victoria Malz; Honduras – Stephie Morel; Iceland – Helena O'Connor; Japan – Yuki Sonoda; Mexico – Andrea Sáenz Castillo; Myanmar – Myo Sandar Win Δ; Nigeria – Sectra Okundaye; Peru – Nathaly Terrones; Romania – Kira Andreea Ioana Stan; Slovakia – Petra Siváková Δ; United Kingdom – Joanna Johnson

★ – placed into the Top 12 by fan-voting challenge

Δ – placed into the Top 25 by fast-track challenges

♡ – placed into the Top 25 by "the Candidate's Choice" (chosen by fellow contestants)

=== Continental titleholders ===
The award was presented to representatives who achieved the highest ranking within the continent, excluding those in the Top 5.

Continent	Contestant
Africa	South Africa – Bryoni Govender
Americas	Mexico – Andrea Sáenz Castillo
Asia and Oceania	Philippines – Alethea Ambrosio
Caribbean	Puerto Rico – Fiorella Medina
Europe	Denmark – Victoria Larsen

=== Special awards ===
Award	Contestant
Best National Costume	Venezuela - Rossana Fiorini
Miss Congeniality	Panama – Samantha Jones
Miss Talent	Indonesia – Harashta Haifa Zahra
Woman of Substance	United Kingdom - Joanna Johnson

=== Fast track challenges ===
Challenge	Contestant
Supra Chat	Curaçao – Chanelle de Lau
Supra Model of The Year	Slovakia – Petra Siváková
Supra Influencer	Myanmar – Myo Sandar Win
Supra Fan Vote	Denmark – Victoria Larsen
Contestant's Choice	South Africa – Bryoni Govender

== Challenge events ==
=== Supra Chat ===
The Supra Chat event commenced on 16 May 2024, and was broadcast via the official YouTube channel of Miss Supranational. Each participant had the opportunity to introduce themselves to a gathering comprising five to nine individuals. In this year's edition, ten groups vied for supremacy, with the victors from each group advancing to the final round of the competition.

==== First Round ====
- Advanced to the semi-final.

Group	Country 1	Country 2	Country 3	Country 4	Country 5	Country 6	Country 7	Country 8	Country 9
1	Canada	Denmark	Haiti	India	New Zealand	Pakistan	United States Virgin Islands	—N/a	—N/a
2	Germany	Iceland	Malta	Poland	Romania	Slovakia	United Kingdom	—N/a	—N/a
3	Bolivia	Brazil	Costa Rica	Ecuador	Honduras	Portugal	Venezuela	—N/a	—N/a
4	Albania	Belgium	Cayman Islands	Curaçao	Myanmar	Netherlands	Philippines	—N/a	—N/a
5	Australia	Botswana	Czech Republic	Equatorial Guinea	Sierra Leone	Spain	—N/a	—N/a	—N/a
6	Argentina	Colombia	Cuba	Dominican Republic	El Salvador	Mexico	Nicaragua	—N/a	—N/a
7	Aruba	Côte d'Ivoire	Ghana	Gibraltar	Nepal	Trinidad and Tobago	—N/a	—N/a	—N/a
8	Bangladesh	Hong Kong	Indonesia	Japan	Laos	Malaysia	South Korea	Thailand	—N/a
9	Guatemala	Paraguay	Peru	Puerto Rico	Uruguay	—N/a	—N/a	—N/a	—N/a
10	Cambodia	Croatia	Finland	Nigeria	Panama	South Africa	Ukraine	United States	Vietnam

==== Semi Final Round ====
- Advanced to the final round.

Group	Country 1	Country 2	Country 3	Country 4	Country 5
1	Brazil	Curaçao	Czech Republic	Haiti	United Kingdom
2	Dominican Republic	Indonesia	Nigeria	Puerto Rico	Trinidad and Tobago

==== Final Round ====
- Advanced to the Top 25.

Placement	Country
Winner	Curaçao – Chanelle de Lau
Top 4	Haiti – Tarah-Lynn Saint-Elien; Nigeria – Sectra Okundaye; Puerto Rico – Fiorella Medina

=== Miss Influencer Opportunity ===
In the Miss Influencer Opportunity, two women were selected as winners through the Facebook competition, and the rest were chosen as winners through Instagram, YouTube, TikTok, and X competition. As a result, they automatically became part of the Top 13 finalists. If one of them was successful in the challenge, they automatically advanced to become a semifinalist in the finals.

- Advanced to the Top 25 via Miss Influencer Opportunity

Placement	Country
Winner	Myanmar – Myo Sandar Win
Top 5	Brazil – Isadora Murta; Denmark – Victoria Larsen; Indonesia – Harashta Haifa Zahra; Mexico – Andrea Sáenz Castillo
Top 13	~~Cambodia – Chandara Chhum~~; Côte d'Ivoire – Marie-Louise Maitre; Gibraltar – Phoebe Noble; India – Sonal Kukreja; Nepal – Sajina Khanal; Philippines – Alethea Ambrosio; Venezuela – Rossana Fiorini; Vietnam – Lydie Phương Ly Vũ

=== Supra Fan Vote ===
The winner of the Supra Fan Vote was automatically advanced to the Top 12 of Miss Supranational 2024. Voting began on 18 June 2024, and lasted until the final night. The final list of the leaderboard was announced on 6 July before the finals.

- Advanced to the Top 12 via Supra Fan-Vote.

Placement	Country
Winner	Denmark – Victoria Larsen
Top 10	Colombia – Sherren Londoño Perea; Curaçao – Chanelle de Lau; Laos – Christina Lasasimma; Myanmar – Myo Sandar Win; Nigeria – Sectra Okundaye; Philippines – Alethea Ambrosio; Trinidad and Tobago – Brittany Deane; Venezuela – Rossana Fiorini; Vietnam – Lydie Phương Ly Vũ

=== Supra Model of the Year ===
The Supra Model of the Year event was streamed live on the official Miss Supranational YouTube channel at 6 pm on 29 June 2024. At the event, it was announced that one of the five continental winners would advance to the finals as a semi-finalist after being named the overall winner during the final night.

- Advanced to the Top 25 via Supra Model of the Year

Placement	Contestant	
Winner	Slovakia – Petra Siváková	
Continental Winners	Africa	Côte d'Ivoire – Marie-Louise Maitre
Continental Winners	Americas	Bolivia – Estefanía Ibarra
Continental Winners	Asia & Oceania	Thailand – Kasama Suetrong
Continental Winners	Caribbean	Aruba – Rashida Schmidt
Continental Winners	Europe	Slovakia – Petra Siváková
Top 11	Botswana – Leah Barobetse; Mexico – Andrea Sáenz; Myanmar – Myo Sandar Win; Philippines – Alethea Ambrosio; Poland – Angelika Jurkowianiec; Puerto Rico – Fiorella Medina	

=== Miss Talent ===
On 25 June, twenty talent entries were showcased on Miss Supranational's official YouTube channel, followed by a voting process. The Supra Talent Finals event was broadcast live on the Miss Supranational official YouTube channel at 9 pm on 29 June 2024. Miss Denmark and Myanmar were chosen individually to participate in the final competition.

Placement	Contestant
Winner	Indonesia – Harashta Haifa Zahra
Top 7	Czech Republic – Justýna Zedníková; Denmark – Victoria Larsen; Gibraltar – Phoebe Noble; Japan – Yuki Sonoda; Myanmar – Myo Sandar Win; Netherlands – Bo Grooten
Top 20	Bangladesh – Towhida Tusnim Tifa; Belgium – Elizabeth Raska; Canada – Rachel Murgel; Chile – Vaihere Domingo; Colombia – Sherren Londoño Perea; Croatia – Esmeralda Slaviček; Curaçao – Chanelle de Lau; El Salvador – Naomy Montiel; Germany – Luisa Victoria Malz; Hong Kong – Jo An Ma; Nepal – Sajina Khanal; New Zealand – Meghan Kenney; Sierra Leone – Mabinty Mansaray; Slovakia – Petra Siváková; Trinidad and Tobago – Brittany Deane

== Pageant ==
=== Presenters ===
On 6 June 2024, the President of the Miss Supranational Organization, Gerhard Parzutka von Lipinski, announced Nico Panagio as the host for the Miss and Mister Supranational 2024 Final Shows. Katarzyna Kołeczek also joined Panagio at the finals.

- Nico Panagio: South African actor, host of Survivor South Africa
- Kasia Kołeczek: Polish/British actress
- Aleksander Sikora: Polish Presenter

=== Panel of experts ===
The Preliminary Competition was broadcast live on the official Miss Supranational YouTube channel at 8pm CET on 1 July 2024, with the panel of experts consisting of:

- Andrea Aguilera – Miss Supranational 2023 from Ecuador
- Andre Sleigh – Creative Director of the Miss and Mister Supranational
- Iván Álvarez Guedes – Mister Supranational 2023 from Spain
- Keisha - Polish stylist and designer
- Louisa - Creative producer of Miss Supranational and Mister Supranational 2024 finals shows
- Nguyễn Huỳnh Kim Duyên – Miss Supranational 2022 2nd runner-up from Vietnam
- Rick Sotelo - Supranational Stylist
- Robert Czepiel – General Director of Jubiler Schubert / World of Amber

The final show was broadcast live on the official Miss Supranational YouTube channel at 8pm CET, on 6 July 2024, with the panel of experts consisting of:

- Andrea Aguilera – Miss Supranational 2023 from Ecuador
- Daria Marx – Singer
- Edyta Folwarska – Novelist and journalist
- Ewa Wachowicz – Miss Polonia 1992 and World Miss University 1993 from Poland
- Fezile Mkhize – Mister Supranational 2024 from South Africa
- Gerhard Parzutka von Lipinski – Founder and CEO of Miss Supranational organization
- Iván Álvarez Guedes – Mister Supranational 2023 from Spain
- Katarzyna Jonaczyk – Multiple-time OCR world champion
- Nguyễn Huỳnh Kim Duyên – Miss Supranational 2022 2nd runner-up from Vietnam
- Robert Czepiel – General Director of Jubiler Schubert / World of Amber

== Contestants ==
Sixty-eight contestants competed for the title:

Country/Territory	Contestant	Age (Note: Ages at the time of the pageant)	Hometown	Continental Group
Albania	Ema Hila	18	Tirana	Europe
Argentina	Agustina Bruenner	26	Posadas	Americas
Aruba	Rashida Schmidt	22	San Nicolaas	Caribbean
Australia	Janaya Reimers	21	Melbourne	Oceania
Bangladesh	Towhida Tusnim Tifa	26	Gazipur	Asia
Belgium	Elizabeth Raska	25	Brussels	Europe
Bolivia	Estefanía Ibarra	29	La Paz	Americas
Botswana	Leah Barobetse	25	Lentsweletau	Africa
Brazil	Isadora Murta	26	Belo Horizonte	Americas
Canada	Rachel Murgel	23	Belleville	Americas
Cayman Islands	Jaci Patrick	29	West Bay	Caribbean
Chile	Vaihere Domingo	24	Viña del Mar	Americas
Colombia	Sherren Londoño Perea	23	Bogotá	Americas
Costa Rica	María José Segura	27	Cartago	Americas
(Ivory Coast) Côte d' Ivoire	Marie-Louise Maitre	26	Bouaké	Africa
Croatia	Esmeralda Slaviček	26	Zagreb	Europe
Cuba	María José Cetina	19	Camagüey	Caribbean
Curaçao	Chanelle de Lau	29	Willemstad	Caribbean
Czech Republic	Justýna Zedníková	21	Prague	Europe
Denmark	Victoria Larsen	21	Roskilde	Europe
Dominican Republic	Jennifer Valdez	26	Pedernales	Caribbean
Ecuador	Doménica Alessi	22	Quito	Americas
El Salvador	Naomy Montiel	19	San Miguel	Americas
Finland	Aleksandra Hannusaari	20	Kauhajoki	Europe
Germany	Luisa Victoria Malz	21	Dortmund	Europe
Ghana	Abigail Fanna Kabirou	24	Dubai	Africa
Gibraltar	Phoebe Noble	21	Gibraltar	Europe
Guatemala	Andrea Zapeta	29	Cobán	Americas
Haiti	Tarah-Lynn Saint-Elien	29	Rahway	Caribbean
Honduras	Stephie Morel	20	Choloma	Americas
Hong Kong	Jo An Ma	27	Hong Kong	Asia
Iceland	Helena O'Connor	19	Reykjavík	Europe
India	Sonal Kukreja	26	Jaipur	Asia
Indonesia	Harashta Haifa Zahra	20	Garut	Asia
Italy	Camilla Farnesi	24	Viareggio	Europe
Japan	Yuki Sonoda	25	Kagoshima	Asia
Laos	Christina Lasasimma	31	Vientiane	Asia
Malaysia	Andreana Celly	20	Lundu	Asia
Malta	Shania Degiorgio	20	Valletta	Europe
Mexico	Andrea Sáenz Castillo	26	Chihuahua	Americas
Myanmar	Myo Sandar Win	28	Thanbyuzayat	Asia
Nepal	Sajina Khanal	23	Sarlahi	Asia
Netherlands	Bo Grooten	23	Coevorden	Europe
New Zealand	Meghan Kenney	29	Ōhope	Oceania
Nicaragua	Elena Etienne	23	Managua	Americas
Nigeria	Sectra Okundaye	25	Zamfara	Africa
Pakistan	Misbah Arshad	26	Lahore	Asia
Panama	Samantha Jones	27	Panama City	Americas
Paraguay	Sofía Meyer	22	Ciudad del Este	Americas
Peru	Nathaly Terrones	28	Lima	Americas
Philippines	Alethea Ambrosio	21	San Rafael	Asia
Poland	Angelika Jurkowianiec	28	Namysłów	Europe
Portugal	Cristina Carvalho	30	Azores	Europe
Puerto Rico	Fiorella Medina	28	Isabela	Caribbean
Romania	Kira Andreea Ioana Stan	25	Bucharest	Europe
Sierra Leone	Mabinty Mansaray	22	Kabala	Africa
Slovakia	Petra Siváková	23	Humenné	Europe
South Africa	Bryoni Govender	27	Kempton Park	Africa
Spain	Elizabeth Laker	26	Tenerife	Europe
Thailand	Kasama Suetrong	28	Surat Thani	Asia
Trinidad and Tobago	Brittany Deane	27	San Fernando	Caribbean
Ukraine	Marina Mizhnova	21	Ternopil	Europe
United Kingdom	Joanna Johnson	30	Blackpool	Europe
United States	Jenna Dykstra	28	Clearwater	Americas
United States Virgin Islands	Bria James	26	Saint Croix	Caribbean
Uruguay	Lola de los Santos	27	Paysandú	Americas
Venezuela	Rossana Fiorini	29	Mérida	Americas
Vietnam	Lydie Phương Ly Vũ	31	Ho Chi Minh City	Asia
