= Miss Universe Philippines 2023 =

4th Miss Universe Philippines pageant

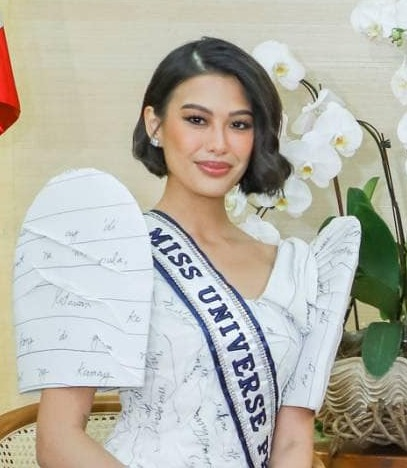
- Michelle Dee
- Date: May 13, 2023
- Presenters: Alden Richards; Xian Lim; Zozibini Tunzi; Tim Yap; Maureen Montagne
- Entertainment: Nam Woo-hyun; Jessica Sanchez; SV Squad
- Theme: Inspirational Filipina
- Venue: SM Mall of Asia Arena, Pasay,
- Broadcaster: ABS-CBN; GMA Network
- Entrants: 38
- Placements: 18
- Withdrawals: Davao del Norte; Mandaue; Pangasinan
- Winner: Michelle Dee; Makati
- Congeniality: Shayne Glenmae Maquiran, Capiz
- Best National Costume: Airissh Ramos, Eastern Samar
- Photogenic: Jannarie Zarzoso, Agusan del Norte

External videos
- Full show of the Coronation
- The Grand Coronation Night

Miss Universe Philippines 2023 was the fourth Miss Universe Philippines pageant, held at the SM Mall of Asia Arena in Bay City, Pasay, Metro Manila, Philippines, on May 13, 2023.

Michelle Dee of Makati won the competition, succeeding Celeste Cortesi of Pasay. Dee went on to represent the Philippines at Miss Universe 2023 in El Salvador, where she reached the top ten.

Contestants from thirty-eight localities competed in this contest. The pageant was hosted by Xian Lim, Alden Richards, and Miss Universe 2019 Zozibini Tunzi, while TV and radio host Tim Yap and The Miss Globe 2021 Maureen Montagne were the backstage hosts. South Korean singer, Nam Woo-hyun, Filipino-American singer Jessica Sanchez, and the SV Squad performed as musical guests.

== Background ==
=== Selection of participants ===
On November 7, 2022, the organization launched its search for the next candidate to represent the Philippines at Miss Universe 2023. The online application period was initially set until January 29, 2023. However, it was moved twice—first to February 5, 2023, and later to February 14, 2023. On-site application was done from February 13–17, 2023. The final selection and the initial 40 contestants were subsequently named on February 18, 2023.

In September 2022, the Miss Universe organization announced changes to its rules, allowing women to join the pageant regardless of marital status, beginning in 2023. The national pageant followed suit, opening its applications to Filipino citizens aged 18 to 27, regardless of the applicant's civil status and height.

==== Withdrawals ====
Out of the original 40 contestants, Miss Pangasinan, Evangeline Fuentes, withdrew from the competition due to health concerns. As a result, the organization decided to include Miss Apayao, Kristeen Mae Boccang, as a replacement for Fuentes among the official top 40 candidates. Dianne Mae Refugio from Davao del Norte and Breanna Marie Evans from Mandaue withdrew for undisclosed reasons.

=== Location and date ===
On March 3, 2023, the organization announced that the coronation would be on May 13, 2023, at the SM Mall of Asia Arena in Bay City, Metro Manila. The sale of tickets for the coronation night began on April 3, 2023.

SM Mall of Asia Arena, the venue of the Miss Universe Philippines 2023.

=== New titles ===
The Miss Universe Philippines Organization announced two new, but unnamed titles for this contest, which received polarized reactions on social media. On February 21, 2023, Jakkaphong Jakrajutatip, the owner of the Miss Universe Organization, stated her preference for each country's delegate to be selected through a separate local pageant. This announcement led to speculation about whether it would have any impact on the plans of the local organization for the new titles.

On the coronation night, the additional titles were not used, as they were under the EmpirePH organization. The following morning, at a separate event at the Okada Manila, finalists Pauline Amelinckx and Krishnah Gravidez were appointed Miss Supranational Philippines 2023 and Miss Charm Philippines 2024, respectively. They are to represent the country at Miss Supranational 2023, to be held at Nowy Sącz, Małopolska, Poland; and Miss Charm 2024 respectively.

== Results ==
=== Placements ===
Map of the participating cities and provinces and the placements of their respective delegates

Placements	Contestant
Miss Universe Philippines 2023	Makati – Michelle Dee
1st Runner-Up	Zambales – CJ Opiaza
2nd Runner-Up	Pampanga – Angelique Manto ‡
Top 5	Baguio – Krishnah Gravidez; Bohol – Pauline Amelinckx ‡
Top 18 (Note: Due to technical difficulties in tallying the top ten semifinalists, top ten was reverted to top eighteen.)	Agusan del Norte – Jannarie Zarzoso ‡; Bacolod – Jan Bordon; Bulacan – Princess Marcos §; Cavite – Samantha Panlilio; Cebu – Emmanuelle Vera; Davao Oriental – Klyza Castro; Eastern Samar – Airissh Ramos; Isabela – Kimberlyn Acob; Mandaluyong – Iman Cristal; Marinduque – Christine Salcedo; Parañaque – Clarielle Dacanay; Sorsogon – Rein Carrascal; Tiaong – Afia Yeboah

§ – Smilee Casting Fan Vote winner
‡ – Challenge winners

=== Appointments ===
In a separate ceremony after the coronation, two finalists were appointed to represent the Philippines on the following pageants:

Title	Contestant	International Placement	Ref.
The Miss Philippines Supranational 2023	Bohol – Pauline Amelinckx	1st Runner-Up – Miss Supranational 2023	
The Miss Philippines Charm 2024	Baguio – Krishnah Gravidez	Withdrew – Miss Charm 2024	

=== Special awards ===
==== Major awards ====
Award	Contestant
Face of Social Media	Agusan del Norte – Jannarie Zarzoso
Best in Evening Gown	Makati – Michelle Dee
Best in Swimsuit	Baguio – Krishnah Gravidez
Miss Congeniality	Capiz – Shayne Glenmae Maquiran

==== Sponsor awards ====
Award	Contestant
Miss Aqua Boracay	Makati – Michelle Dee
Miss Pond's	Makati – Michelle Dee
Miss Zion Philippines	Makati – Michelle Dee
Miss Avana	Bohol – Pauline Amelinckx
Miss Creamsilk Ultimate	Bohol – Pauline Amelinckx
Miss Enderun	Bohol – Pauline Amelinckx
Miss Hello Glow	Bohol – Pauline Amelinckx
Miss Jojo Bragais	Bohol – Pauline Amelinckx
Miss Kemans Body	Bohol – Pauline Amelinckx
Miss Origee Beauty Drink by Skin Magical	Bohol – Pauline Amelinckx
Miss Smilee Apparel	Bohol – Pauline Amelinckx
Miss Soen	Bohol – Pauline Amelinckx
Miss Titan Universe	Bohol – Pauline Amelinckx
Miss Avon	Pampanga – Mary Angelique Manto
Miss Cavaso	Pampanga – Mary Angelique Manto
Miss Jewelmer	Pampanga – Mary Angelique Manto
Miss Okada	Pampanga – Mary Angelique Manto
Miss Kingston International College	Agusan del Norte – Jannarie Zarzoso

== Pre-pageant events ==
In the run-up to the coronation night, the thirty-eight contestants competed in various challenges to compete for a spot in the finals. The winners of each challenge were determined by a public vote and were announced during the coronation night, securing their place in the top 18. The voting period for each challenge lasted six days, starting with the photoshoot challenge on April 3, 2023, followed by the swimsuit challenge on April 10, 2023, and concluding with the Jojo Bragais runway challenge on April 24, 2023, which was adjusted following the extension of the voting period from the previous challenge. On May 7, the casting challenge was later held in addition to the previously announced challenges, where the winner was guaranteed a spot as a semifinalist.

Challenges	Results		Ref.
Challenges	Challenge Winner(s)	Top 5 Finalists	Ref.
Glam Challenge	Agusan del Norte – Jannarie Zarzoso	Agusan del Norte – Jannarie Zarzoso; Bulacan – Princess Anne Marcos; Eastern Samar – Airissh Ramos; Pampanga – Mary Angelique Manto; Quezon – Lesly Joy Sim	
Swimsuit Challenge	Bohol – Pauline Amelinckx	Agusan del Norte – Jannarie Zarzoso; Bohol – Pauline Amelinckx; Bulacan – Princess Anne Marcos; Capiz – Shayne Glenmae Maquiran; Pampanga – Mary Angelique Manto	
Runway Challenge	Pampanga – Mary Angelique Manto	Agusan del Norte – Jannarie Zarzoso; Bohol – Pauline Amelinckx; Bulacan – Princess Anne Marcos; Makati – Michelle Dee; Pampanga – Mary Angelique Manto	

=== National Costume competition ===
The national costume competition was held at the Leyte Normal University in Tacloban, Leyte, Philippines on May 4, 2023. The theme of this contest's national costume competition was "ani" (harvest), which pays homage to the rich history and traditions of Filipino farming communities. The event was hosted by Miss Universe Philippines 2019 Gazini Ganados and actor Marco Gumabao. At the end of the event, the top three for the Tingog ng Filipina and the Best in National Costume awards were revealed.

Awards	Winners		Ref(s)
Best in National Costume	Winner	Eastern Samar – Airissh Ramos	
Best in National Costume	Second Place	Benguet – Joemay-an Leo	
Best in National Costume	Third Place	Southern Leyte – Kimberly Escartin	
Tingog ng Filipina	Luzon	Baguio – Krishnah Gravidez	
Tingog ng Filipina	Visayas	Eastern Samar – Airrish Ramos	
Tingog ng Filipina	Mindanao	Agusan del Norte – Jannarie Zarzoso	

== Pageant ==
=== Format ===
Following an extended 30-minute commercial break following the announcement of the top ten, host Xian Lim announced that the previously announced results would be reverted due to technical difficulties from the pageant's tabulation system. As a result, the entire top 18 competed in the evening gown competition, as well for as a spot in the top five.

The sudden announcement drew comment from social media, due to a lack of transparency on the pageant's selection mechanics.

=== Selection committee ===
The judges for both the preliminary competition and the finale determined the results alongside a public vote. This year's judges included:

- Lyn Lee – Managing Director of Smilee Apparel
- Tonee Charmagne Co Hang – CFO of Aqua Boracay
- Ana Garces – Head of Marketing at Avon Philippines
- Annette Gozon-Valdes – GMA Network SVP and GMA Films President and CEO
- Sam Verzosa – Congressman
- Yedda Marie Romualdez – Congresswoman, Binibining Pilipinas International 1996
- R'Bonney Gabriel – Miss Universe 2022 from the United States
- Margarita Moran – Miss Universe 1973 from the Philippines
- Lloyd Lee – Executive Director of Net Asia Industries Incorporated
- Nelda Eufemio – Dentist
- Dyan Castillejo – ABS-CBN Sports Correspondent
- Marrion Brandellick De Guzman – Chief Marketing Officer of Jewelmer

== Contestants ==
The following 38 contestants, representing their respective cities or provinces, competed for the title:

City/Province	Contestant	Age (Note: Ages at the time of the pageant.)
Agusan del Norte (Cabadbaran)	Jannarie Zarzoso	24
Aklan (Kalibo)	Avery Mariane Sucgang	21
Apayao	Kristeen Mae Boccang	23
Bacolod	Jan Marie Bordon	22
Bacoor	Alexandria Bollier	25
Baguio	Krishnah Gravidez	22
Batangas	Karen Joyce Olfato	25
Benguet	Joemay-an Leo	27
Bohol	Pauline Amelinckx	27
Bulacan	Princess Anne Marcos	24
Capiz	Shayne Glenmae Maquiran	25
Cavite	Samantha Panlilio	27
Cebu	Emmanuelle Vera	28
Cebu City	Dianne Padillo	27
Davao Oriental (Mati)	Klyza Castro	23
Eastern Samar	Airissh Ramos	26
Guimaras	Vanessa Mella Tse Wing	26
Iloilo City	Chloei Darl Gabales	22
Isabela	Kimberlyn Jane Acob	24
Lapu-Lapu	Clare Inso	24
Makati	Michelle Dee	28
Mandaluyong	Iman Franchesca Cristal	24
Marinduque	Christine Joyce Salcedo	24
Negros Oriental	Vanessa Maria Matzeit	25
Northern Samar	Layla Adriatico	26
Occidental Mindoro (Abra de Ilog)	Laicka Implamado	26
Palawan	Louise Joy Gallardo	21
Pampanga	Mary Angelique Manto	26
Parañaque	Clarielle Dacanay	25
Pasig	Kali Navea-Huff	27
Quezon	Lesly Joy Sim	26
Quezon City	Mary Eileen Gonzales	27
Sorsogon	Rein Hillary Carrascal	25
Southern Leyte	Kimberly Escartin	25
Surigao del Norte	Hyra Desiree Betito	26
Taguig	Nikki Justine Breedveld	26
Tiaong	Christiana Afia Yeboah	25
Zambales	CJ Opiaza	24
