= Reina Hispanoamericana 2019 =

29th Reina Hispanoamericana pageant

- Date: February 8, 2020
- Venue: Salón Sirionó, Fexpocruz, Santa Cruz de la Sierra, Bolivia
- Entrants: 29
- Placements: 11
- Withdrawals: Canada
- Winner: Regina Peredo; Mexico
- Congeniality: Montserrat Báez; United States
- Best National Costume: Stefani Zeceña; Guatemala
- Photogenic: Yuanile Alvarado; Puerto Rico

Reina Hispanoamericana 2020 was the 29th Reina Hispanoamericana pageant, held at the Salón Sirionó, Fexpocruz in Santa Cruz de la Sierra, Bolivia, on February 8, 2020.

Nariman Battikha of Venezuela crowned Regina Peredo of Mexico as her successor at the end of the event. This was Mexico’s first victory in 11 years and second overall.

== Results ==
=== Placements ===
Placement	Contestant
Reina Hispanoamericana 2019	Mexico – Regina Peredo
Virreina Hispanoamericana 2019	Brazil – Gabrielle Vilela
1st Runner-Up	Colombia – Laura Claro
2nd Runner-Up	Puerto Rico -Yuanilie Alvarado
3rd Runner-Up	Paraguay – Ketlin Lottermann
4th Runner-Up	Venezuela – Valeria Badell
5th Runner-Up	Philippines – Katrina Llegado §
6th Runner-Up	Spain - Ainara Cardaño
7th Runner-Up	Dominican Republic – Franchesca Astier
8th Runner-Up	Haiti – Cassandra Cherry
9th Runner-Up	United States – Monserrat Báez

§ – Voted into the Top 11 by viewers

=== Order of Announcements ===
Top 11

1. Mexico
2. Philippines
3. Venezuela
4. Puerto Rico
5. Paraguay
6. Brazil
7. Dominican Republic
8. Spain
9. Colombia
10. Haiti
11. United States

== Hispanic Beauty Gala ==
Final results	Country
Amazonas Girl	Uruguay – Lincy Colman
Best Costume	Guatemala – Stefani Zeceña
Miss Sports	Uruguay – Lincy Colman
Miss Personality	Colombia – Laura Claro
Best Hair	Uruguay – Lincy Colman
Best Smile	United States – Monserrat Báez
Miss Elegant Face	Venezuela – Valeria Vadell
Miss Photogenic	Puerto Rico – Yuanilie Alvarado
Miss Silueta	Venezuela – Valeria Badell

== Contestants ==
Twenty-nine contestants competed for the title.

Country/Territory	Contestant	Age (Note: Ages at the time of the pageant)	Hometown
Argentina	Sasha Gigliani	25	Salta
Aruba	Sarah Van Der Steen	20	Oranjestad
Bolivia	Angélica Romero	18	Tarija
Belize	Gabriela Varela	26	Belize City
Brazil	Gabrielle Vilela de Souza	27	São Paulo
Colombia	Laura Claro	23	Cúcuta
Costa Rica	Marianella Chaves Serrano	27	Liberia
Chile	Aylin Jaldín	25	Los Vilos
Cuba	Sissie Hariem	25	Pinar del Rio
Curaçao	Tiffany de Freitas Brás	21	Willemstad
Dominican Republic	Franchesca Astier	21	Santo Domingo
Ecuador	María José Rivera	19	Manta
Europe	Verónica Zito	22	Lisbon
El Salvador	Gabriela Acevedo	24	San Salvador
Guatemala	Stefani Zeceña	20	Huehuetenango
Haiti	Cassandra Cherry	24	Port-au-Prince
Honduras	Gabriela Irías Paz	19	Comayagua
Mexico	Regina Peredo Gutiérrez	21	Puebla
Nicaragua	Stefanía de Jesús Alemán Cerda	28	Masaya
Panama	Linette Clément	22	Chiriquí
Paraguay	Ketlin Lottermann	25	Asunción
Peru	Pierina Meléndez	28	Lima
Philippines	Katrina Llegado	21	Taguig
Portugal	Diana Sofía Silva	23	Porto
Puerto Rico	Yuanilie Alvarado	23	Ponce
Spain	Ainara Cardaño	25	Madrid
Uruguay	Lincy Colman	19	Punta del Este
United States	Monserrat Báez	19	Phoenix
Venezuela	Valeria Badell	22	Maracaibo

== Crossovers ==
These are the contestants who previously competed or will be competing at other international beauty pageants:

Miss Universe

- 2017: Haiti Casandra Cherry
- 2019: Paraguay Ketlin Lottermann

Miss World

- 2015: Nicaragua Stefanía Alemán
- 2017: Brazil Gabrielle Vilela (Top 40)

Miss International

- 2018: Haiti Cassandra Cherry
- 2018: Nicaragua Stefania Aleman
- 2023: Panama Linette Clement (Top 15)

Miss Supranational

- 2026: Philippines Katrina Llegado (Winner)

Miss Grand International

- 2017: Portugal Diana Sofía Silva
- 2018: Brazil Gabrielle Vilela (Top 21)

Miss Eco International

- 2017: Portugal Diana Sofía Silva

Reinado Internacional de la Ganaderia

- 2013: Brazil Gabrielle Vilela (Winner)

Miss Planet International

- 2019: Costa Rica Marianella Chaves Serrano (Top 16)

Miss World Latin

- 2018: Guatemala Stefani Zeceña

World Top Model

- 2018: Uruguay Lincy Colman (4th Runner-Up)
- 2018: Curacao Tiffany de Freitas Brás

Miss Intercontinental

- 2021: Costa Rica Marianella Chaves Serrano

The Miss Globe

- 2022: Costa Rica Marianella Chaves Serrano (Top 15)

Universal Woman

- 2023: Argentina Sasha Gigliani
