= Miss Asia Pacific International 2024 =

5th edition of the Miss Asia Pacific International competition

- Date: 7 October 2024
- Presenters: Joey Mead King; Marc Nelson; Myx Chanel
- Venue: Newport Performing Arts Theater, Pasay, Philippines
- Entrants: 33
- Placements: 20
- Debuts: Great Britain; Tonga; Zambia
- Withdrawals: Armenia; Azerbaijan; Brazil; Cambodia; Cameroon; China; Costa Rica; Dominican Republic; Egypt; Ghana; Guatemala; French Guiana; Honduras; Israel; Italy; Laos; Latvia; Luxembourg; Macau; Mauritius; Namibia; Nepal; Northern Cyprus; Panama; Portugal; Romania; Slovenia; South Africa; Spain
- Returns: Bangladesh; Chile; Sweden; United States; Venezuela
- Winner: Janelis Leyba; United States
- Congeniality: Keshia Lee Llarenas (Guam)
- Best National Costume: Phạm Thị Ánh Vương (Vietnam)
- Photogenic: Janelis Leyba (United States)

Miss Asia Pacific International 2024 was the fifth edition of Miss Asia Pacific International pageant, held at the Newport Performing Arts Theater in Pasay, Metro Manila, Philippines, on 7 October 2024.

Chaiyenne Huisman of Spain crowned Janelis Leyba of United States as her successor at the end of the event.

== Resumption of pageant ==
The competition returned after a five-year hiatus under the new leadership of Eva Patalinjug, who took over as president. Prior to 2024, last Miss Asia Pacific International pageant was held in 2019.

== Results ==
=== Placements ===
Placement	Contestant
Miss Asia Pacific International 2024	United States – Janelis Leyba
1st Runner-Up	Mexico – Karen Sofía Nuñez
2nd Runner-Up	Belgium – Selena Ali ∆
3rd Runner-Up	Philippines – Blessa Figueroa
4th Runner-Up	Germany – Jennifer Prokop ★
Top 10	Canada – Mya Bao; New Zealand – Katharina Weischede; Sweden – Jennifer Grace Olsson; Thailand – Kanyaphatsaphon Rungrueang ★; Vietnam – Ánh Vương Phạm Thị ★
Top 20	Bolivia – Gabriella Padilla ∆; Colombia – Luisa Valentina Ruiz; France – Julie Goye Dogan; Guam – Keshia Lee Llarenas ∆; Hong Kong – Mercedes Pair; India – Sophiya Singh ∆; Netherlands – Merel Van Roon; Nigeria – Chizuruoke Sufficient Arua ∆; Singapore – Alethea Yee; Venezuela – Maria Paula Sanchez

★ – Fast Track Events Winners
∆ – Continental Queens of Beauty

=== Continental Queens of Beauty ===
Continent	Contestant	Ref.
Africa	Nigeria – Chizuruoke Sufficient Arua	
Americas	Bolivia – Gabriella Padilla	
Asia	India – Sophiya Singh	
Europe	Belgium – Selena Ali	
Oceania	Guam – Keshia Lee Llarenas	

=== Special Awards I ===
Award	Contestant	Ref.
Miss Congeniality	Guam – Keshia Lee Llarenas	
Miss Eventologie	Thailand – Kanyaphatsaphon Rungrueang	
Miss Hotel 101	New Zealand – Katharina Weischede	
Miss Lime Hotel & Resort	New Zealand – Katharina Weischede	
Miss Missosology	Guam – Keshia Lee Llarenas	
Miss OPMB Worldwide	New Zealand – Katharina Weischede	
Miss Pageanthology 101	Peru – Maria Fernanda Colchada	
Miss Photogenic	Guam – Keshia Lee Llarenas	
Miss Stronghold	Philippines – Blessa Figueroa	
Miss Zen Institute	Philippines – Blessa Figueroa	
People's Choice Award	Thailand – Kanyaphatsaphon Rungrueang	
Tokyo Grill's Choice	Germany – Jennifer Prokop	

== Contestants ==
Thirty-three contestants competed for the title.

Country/Territory	Contestant	Age	Hometown
Australia	Breanna Mitchell	25	Newcastle
Bangladesh	Tasin Afrin Diana	25	Dhaka
Belgium	Selena Ali	28	Antwerp
Bolivia	Gabriella Padilla	30	Cobija
Canada	Mya Bao	–	Fort McMurray
Chile	Valeria Fernanda Loyola	23	Alto Hospicio
Colombia	Luisa Valentina Ruiz	23	Popayán
France	Julie Goye Dogan	27	Poitou-Charentes
Germany	Jennifer Prokop	–	Wiesbaden
Great Britain	Rosie Minako		Belfast
Guam	Keshia Lee Llarenas		
Hong Kong	Mercedes Pair		
India	Sophiya Singh		
Indonesia	Dessy Siagan		
Japan	Mohana Tsuda		
Malaysia	Carol Hor Eau Lye		
Mexico	Karen Sofía Nuñez	24	Tecate
Netherlands	Merel Van Roon		The Hague
New Zealand	Katharina Weischede		Wellington
Nigeria	Sufficient Arua		
Peru	María Fernanda Colchado	22	Lima
Philippines	Blessa Ericha Figueroa	22	Calbayog
Russia	Valeriia Volkova		
Singapore	Alethea Yee		
South Korea	Hayoung Cho		
Sweden	Wanja Jennifer Grace Olsson		
Taiwan	Mei Jou Chan		
Thailand	Kanyaphatsaphon Rungrueang	27	Pathum Thani
Tonga	Kayla Tupou		
United States	Janelis Leyba		Malibu
Vietnam	Phạm Thị Ánh Vương	22	Bình Thuận
Venezuela	Maria Paula Sanchez Paez		
Zambia	Precious Soko		
