= Miss Universe Philippines 2022 =

3rd Miss Universe Philippines pageant

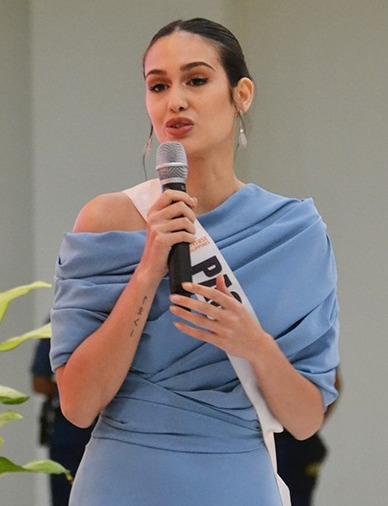
- Celeste Cortesi
- Date: April 30, 2022
- Presenters: Pia Wurtzbach; Iris Mittenaere; Demi-Leigh Tebow
- Entertainment: Bamboo Mañalac; Sam Concepcion; Yheen & Yuki; Francisco Martin; Ez Mil; JM Bales; Arthur Nery; Morissette
- Theme: Uniquely Beautiful
- Venue: SM Mall of Asia Arena, Pasay
- Broadcaster: ABS-CBN; GMA Network
- Entrants: 31
- Placements: 16
- Withdrawals: Benguet
- Winner: Celeste Cortesi; Pasay
- Congeniality: Jewel Alexandria Palacat, Ilocos Sur
- Best National Costume: Julia Eugénie Augustias Saubier, Albay
- Photogenic: Celeste Cortesi, Pasay

External videos
- The Coronation (Full Show)
- The Coronation

Miss Universe Philippines 2022 was the third edition of the Miss Universe Philippines pageant, held at the SM Mall of Asia Arena in Pasay on April 30, 2022.

The coronation night was livestreamed by ABS-CBN through iWantTFC, YouTube, and The Filipino Channel on April 30, 2022 with a delayed telecast on GMA Network on May 1, 2022. Celeste Cortesi of Pasay won the competition, succeeding Beatrice Luigi Gomez of Cebu City. Cortesi represented the Philippines at the Miss Universe 2022 pageant in New Orleans, Louisiana, United States, however, she did not advance to the Top 16, marking the first time since 2009, when Philippines didn't advance to the semi-finals.

== Background ==
=== Location and date ===
On January 3, 2022, the organization announced that the coronation will be in April 2022. Screenings began in February 2022. On March 17, 2022, the organization confirmed that the coronation night will be on April 30, 2022 at the SM Mall of Asia Arena in Pasay.

=== Selection of participants ===
On January 31, 2022, the organization launched its search for the next Filipina who will represent the Philippines at the Miss Universe 2022 competition. The final submission of applications was initially set for February 15, 2022, but was later extended to February 22, 2022.

On February 28, 2022, the organization revealed its Top 50 delegates who will undergo a series of online challenges to compete for a slot in the top 32. The online challenges premiered on Kumu starting March 11, 2022.

==== Top 50 ====
The Top 50 delegates competed in different challenges. The public and judges' votes determined the winners of every challenge.

Challenges	Results		Ref.
Headshot Challenge	Winner	Mandaue – Isabel Luche	
Headshot Challenge	Top 3	Pasay – Celeste Cortesi; Roxas City – Francheska Alexine Dadivas	
Introduction Challenge	Winner	Bohol – Pauline Amelinckx	
Introduction Challenge	Top 3	Cebu Province – Lou Dominique Piczon; San Pablo, Laguna – Shaira Aliyah Diaz	
Swimsuit Challenge	Winner	Taguig – Katrina Llegado	
Swimsuit Challenge	Top 3	Makati – Michelle Dee; Pasay – Celeste Cortesi	
Fashion and Runway Challenge	Winner	Baguio – Ghenesis Latugat	
Fashion and Runway Challenge	Top 3	Cebu City – Chantal Elise Schmidt; Palawan – Angelica Lopez	
Casting Video Challenge	Winner	Pasay – Celeste Cortesi	
Casting Video Challenge	Top 3	Makati – Michelle Dee; Misamis Oriental – Annabelle Mae McDonnell	
Interview Challenge	Winners	Albay – Julia Eugénie Augustias Saubier; Bulacan – Aidyl Mhay Sanchez; Davao del Norte – Jeanne Nicci Orcena; Iloilo Province – Vanessa Ann Caro	

==== Kumu Challenges ====
On March 26, 2022, Kumu announced the two winners for its Livestream and Follower challenges. The winner of the Follower Sprint challenge will get her own Kumu dressing room during the preliminary competition. On the other hand, the winner of the Livestream challenge will get her own make-up artist during the preliminary competition. The winner of the Livestream challenge also became the second official delegate of the pageant.

Challenge	Result	Ref.
Follower Sprint	Mandaue – Isabel Luche	
Livestream Challenge	Davao del Norte – Jeanne Nicci Orcena	

==== Top 32 ====
On April 6, 2022, the organization revealed its final 32 delegates. Two delegates advanced to the Top 32 as Kumunity's choice and Kumu's choice, while thirty delegates were chosen based on all of the online challenges, which were scored by the public and the panel of experts.

Challenge	Result	Ref.
Kumunity's Choice	Benguet – Shawntel Michole Cruz	
Kumu's Choice	Davao del Norte – Jeanne Nicci Orcena	

=== New crown ===
On April 18, 2022, the organization announced that a new crown in collaboration with Jewelmer would be unveiled on April 19, 2022. At the Miss Universe Philippines 2022 gala night held on April 19, 2022, the organization and Jewelmer revealed the new crown named La Mer en Majesté or "The Sea in Majesty" which aptly pays homage to her majesty, the sea, for "she is the queen of the elements". Embedded in it are the Golden South Sea Pearls, the national gem of the Philippines, "a radiant symbol of the harmonious relationship between man and nature, capturing the very spirit of the Filipinos".

== Results ==
=== Placements ===
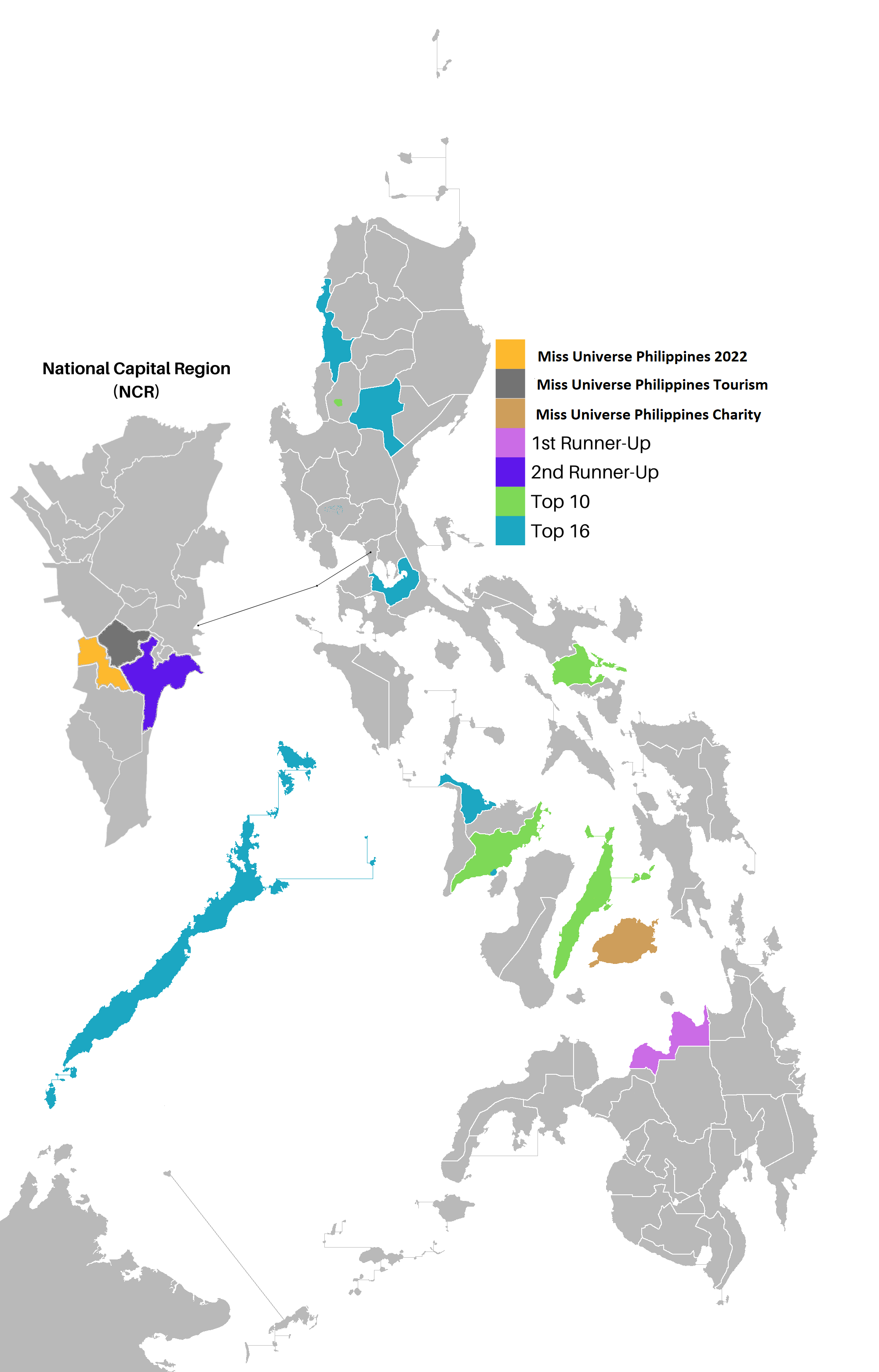
The Philippine map results of Miss Universe Philippines 2022, colors shaded in each province/cities.

Placement	Contestant
Miss Universe Philippines 2022	Pasay – Celeste Cortesi
Miss Universe Philippines Tourism 2022	Makati – Michelle Dee
Miss Universe Philippines Charity 2022	Bohol – Pauline Amelinckx
1st Runner-Up	Misamis Oriental – Annabelle McDonnell
2nd Runner-Up	Taguig – Katrina Llegado
Top 10	Albay – Julia Eugénie Saubier; Baguio – Ghenesis Latugat; Cebu – Lou Dominique Piczon; Cebu City – Chantal Elise Schmidt; Iloilo – Vanessa Ann Caro
Top 16	Aklan – Jona Sweett; Ilocos Sur – Jewel Alexandria Palacat; Iloilo City – Dorothy Marie Gemillan; Laguna – Sonja Jeyn Tanyag; Nueva Vizcaya – Gillian Katherine de Mesa §; Palawan – Angelica Lopez

§ – Lazada Fan Vote Winner

=== Appointment ===
In a separate ceremony, a runner-up was appointed and represented the Philippines in a pageant.

Title	Contestant	International Placement	Ref.
The Miss Philippines Charm 2023	Misamis Oriental – Annabelle Mae McDonnell	1st Runner-Up – Miss Charm 2023	

=== Special awards ===
==== Major awards ====
Award	Contestant	Ref.
Best in Evening Gown	Makati – Michelle Dee	
Best in National Costume	Albay – Julia Eugénie Augustias Saubier	
Best in Swimsuit	Pasay – Celeste Cortesi	
Miss Photogenic	Pasay – Celeste Cortesi	
Miss Friendship	Ilocos Sur – Jewel Alexandria Palacat	

==== Sponsor awards ====
Award	Contestant	Ref.
Face of Essentials by Belo	Makati – Michelle Dee	
Frontrow Catwalk Queen	Makati – Michelle Dee	
Miss Creamsilk	Makati – Michelle Dee	
Miss Jojo Bragais	Makati – Michelle Dee	
Miss Kumuniverse	Makati – Michelle Dee	
Miss SavePoint	Makati – Michelle Dee	
Miss The Medical City	Makati – Michelle Dee	
Frontrow Best Arrival Look (Netizens' Choice)	Taguig – Katrina Llegado; Victorias – Shanelyn Bayson	
Frontrow Best Arrival Look (Press' Choice)	Pasay – Celeste Cortesi	
Miss Aqua Boracay	Pasay – Celeste Cortesi	
Miss Avana	Pasay – Celeste Cortesi	
Miss Sendwave	Pasay – Celeste Cortesi	
Frontrow Choice Queen	Bohol – Pauline Amelinckx	
Miss MG Cars	Bohol – Pauline Amelinckx	
Frontrow Multi-Level Beauty	Misamis Oriental – Annabelle Mae McDonnell	
Luxxe ImmunPlus Queen Majestic	Palawan – Angelica Lopez	
Luxxe Slim Fitness Queen	Pangasinan – Ivylou Borbon	
Miss CAD	Taguig – Katrina Llegado	
Miss Philippine Airlines	Taguig – Katrina Llegado	
Miss Cavaso	Cebu City – Chantal Elise Schmidt	
Miss Coins.ph	San Juan – Danielle Arielle Camcam	
Miss Jewelmer	Mandaue – Isabel Luche	
Miss Okada Manila	Cebu – Lou Dominique Piczon	
Miss Smilee	Nueva Vizcaya – Gillian Katherine de Mesa	

== Pageant ==
=== National Costume competition ===
On April 20, 2022, the organization announced that the national costume competition would be filmed in Vigan, Ilocos Sur, Philippines. Originally scheduled to be livestreamed on TikTok on April 25, 2022, it was moved to April 26, 2022, due to technical concerns. The competition featured a new Johannes Rissler track entitled "Habi". For this edition's national costume competition, the organization decided that 30% of each finalist’s costume should be made of Philippine textiles or weaving.

=== Preliminary competition ===
On April 16, 2022, the organization announced that the preliminary competition would be held on April 27, 2022, at The Cove Manila in Okada Manila, Parañaque, Metro Manila, Philippines. Marco Gumabao and Beatrice Gomez hosted the event, while Ez Mil, Anji Salvacion, Yheen & Yuki, and Gabriel Umali performed as musical guests.

=== Final program ===
On March 17, 2022, the organization confirmed that the coronation night would be on April 30, 2022 at the Mall of Asia Arena in Bay City, Pasay, Metro Manila, Philippines.

On March 26, 2022, the organization announced that former Miss Universe titleholders Pia Wurtzbach, Iris Mittenaere, and Demi-Leigh Tebow would be hosting the coronation night.

On April 12, 2022, the organization announced that musician and singer-songwriter Bamboo Mañalac would be performing on the coronation night. On April 13, 2022, the organization announced that actor, dancer, and singer Sam Concepcion would also be performing on the coronation night. On April 18, 2022, the organization announced that Filipino-American singer Francisco Martin would also be performing at the coronation night. On April 19, 2022, the organization announced that singer-songwriter and performer Morissette, singer-songwriter JM Bales, and R&B singer Arthur Nery would have their special performances on the coronation night.

=== Selection committee ===
The judges for both the preliminary competition and the final telecast determined the results alongside a public vote, which consisted of:

- Lia Ramos – Binibining Pilipinas Universe 2006
- Joshua Sorrentino – International model
- Margarita Gutierrez – Lawyer and vice-president of Professional Models Association of the Philippines (PMAP)
- Richelle Singson-Michael – Architect and businesswoman
- RS Francisco – Actor and co-founder of Frontrow
- Sam Verzosa – Co-founder and CEO of Frontrow
- Jennifer Olay – Pediatrician
- Tonee Co See – Chief Operating Officer of Aqua Boracay
- Francis Padua Papica – Attorney and president of Francis Padua Papica Foundation
- Harnaaz Sandhu – Miss Universe 2021 from India

== Contestants ==
31 contestants competed for the title.

City/Province	Contestant	Age (Note: Ages at the time of pageant)
Aklan	Jona Sweett	26
Albay	Julia Eugénie Augustias Saubier	27
Baguio	Ghenesis Latugat	22
Batanes	Elsa Sally Schumacher	25
Benguet	Shawntel Michole Cruz (Note: Withdrew from the coronation night due to dengue fever)	25
Bohol	Pauline Amelinckx	26
Bulacan	Aidyl Mhay Sanchez	24
Cebu	Lou Dominique Piczon	26
Cebu City	Chantal Elise Schmidt	20
Davao del Norte	Jeanne Nicci Orcena	21
Davao del Sur	Jedidah Korinihona	25
Ilocos Sur	Jewel Alexandria Palacat	22
Iloilo	Vanessa Ann Caro	25
Iloilo City	Dorothy Marie Gemillan	21
Laguna	Sonja Jeyn Tanyag	23
Lapu-Lapu	Sashi Chiesa	26
Las Piñas	Isabelle Kristine Braza	25
Lucena	Anjeanette Japor	26
Makati	Michelle Dee	27
Mandaue	Isabel Luche	22
Misamis Oriental	Annabelle Mae McDonnell	21
Negros Oriental	Marilit Iligan	22
Nueva Vizcaya	Gillian Katherine de Mesa	25
Palawan	Angelica Lopez	21
Pampanga	Alyssa Georgia Felix	27
Pangasinan	Ivylou Borbon	22
Pasay	Celeste Cortesi	24
Quezon	Gracelle Nicole Distura	22
Roxas City	Francheska Alexine Dadivas	22
San Juan	Danielle Arielle Camcam	24
Taguig	Katrina Llegado	24
Victorias	Shanelyn Bayson	22
