= Miss Universe Philippines 2026 =

7th Miss Universe Philippines pageant

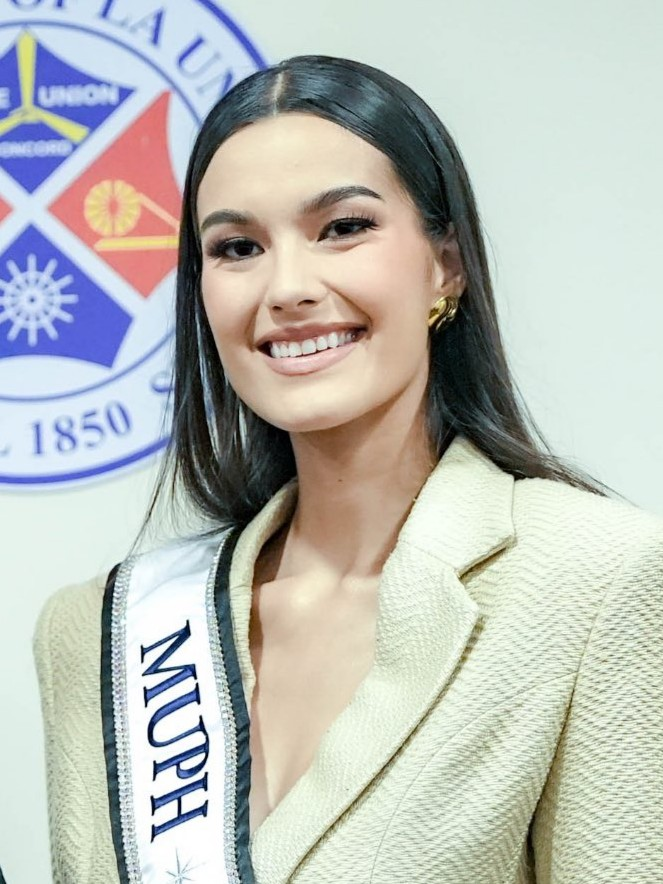
- Bea Millan-Windorski
- Date: May 2, 2026
- Presenters: Marina Summers
- Entertainment: BGYO; Jason Dy
- Venue: SM Mall of Asia Arena, Pasay
- Broadcaster: One PH; TV5; YouTube
- Entrants: 50
- Placements: 30
- Debuts: List: Dasmariñas; Ilocos Norte; Luisiana; Mountain Province; Pateros; San Carlos, Pangasinan; San Jose, Negros Oriental; Santo Tomas, La Union; Sarangani; Taal, Batangas
- Withdrawals: List: Angeles City; Bago, Negros Occidental; Basey, Samar; Benguet; Batangas; Bulacan; Butuan; Caloocan; Camarines Norte; Camarines Sur; Davao Region; Dipolog; Dumaguete; Guipos; Ifugao; Ilocos Sur; Isabela; Kalibo; Lapu-Lapu City; Liliw; Lucena; Malay, Aklan; Naga, Camarines Sur; Naic; Oriental Mindoro; Ozamiz; Pasay; Pasig; Quezon City; Quirino; Romblon; San Fernando, Cebu; San Jose, Batangas; Siargao; Siniloan
- Returns: List: Cabanatuan; Cebu; La Union; Negros Oriental; Nueva Vizcaya; Palawan; Rizal
- Winner: Bea Millan-Windorski; La Union
- Congeniality: Avegail Kultsar, Las Piñas
- Best National Costume: Roxie Baeyens; Baguio; Nicklyn Jutay; Iloilo; Alexandra Colmenares; Negros Occidental; Allyson Hetland; Pampanga; Donna Nuguid; Pangasinan; Jacqueline Gulrajani; Tacloban
- Photogenic: Kristen Marcelino, Pateros
- Best in Swimsuit: Justine Felizarta, Manila

Miss Universe Philippines 2026 was the seventh edition of the Miss Universe Philippines pageant, held at the SM Mall of Asia Arena in Pasay, on May 2, 2026. The event was hosted by Filipino drag performer Marina Summers and featured a performance from Filipino boy band BGYO and singer Jason Dy.

Bea Millan-Windorski of La Union won the competition, succeeding Ahtisa Manalo of Quezon. She will represent the Philippines at Miss Universe 2026. Selected candidates from this batch also received titles from the pageant's sister organization, The Miss Philippines.

Contestants from 50 localities competed for the title. This edition introduced a new format for the contest, which features a preliminary competition taking place over a month with semifinalists determined through the selection committee's choices and rounds of public voting.

== Location ==
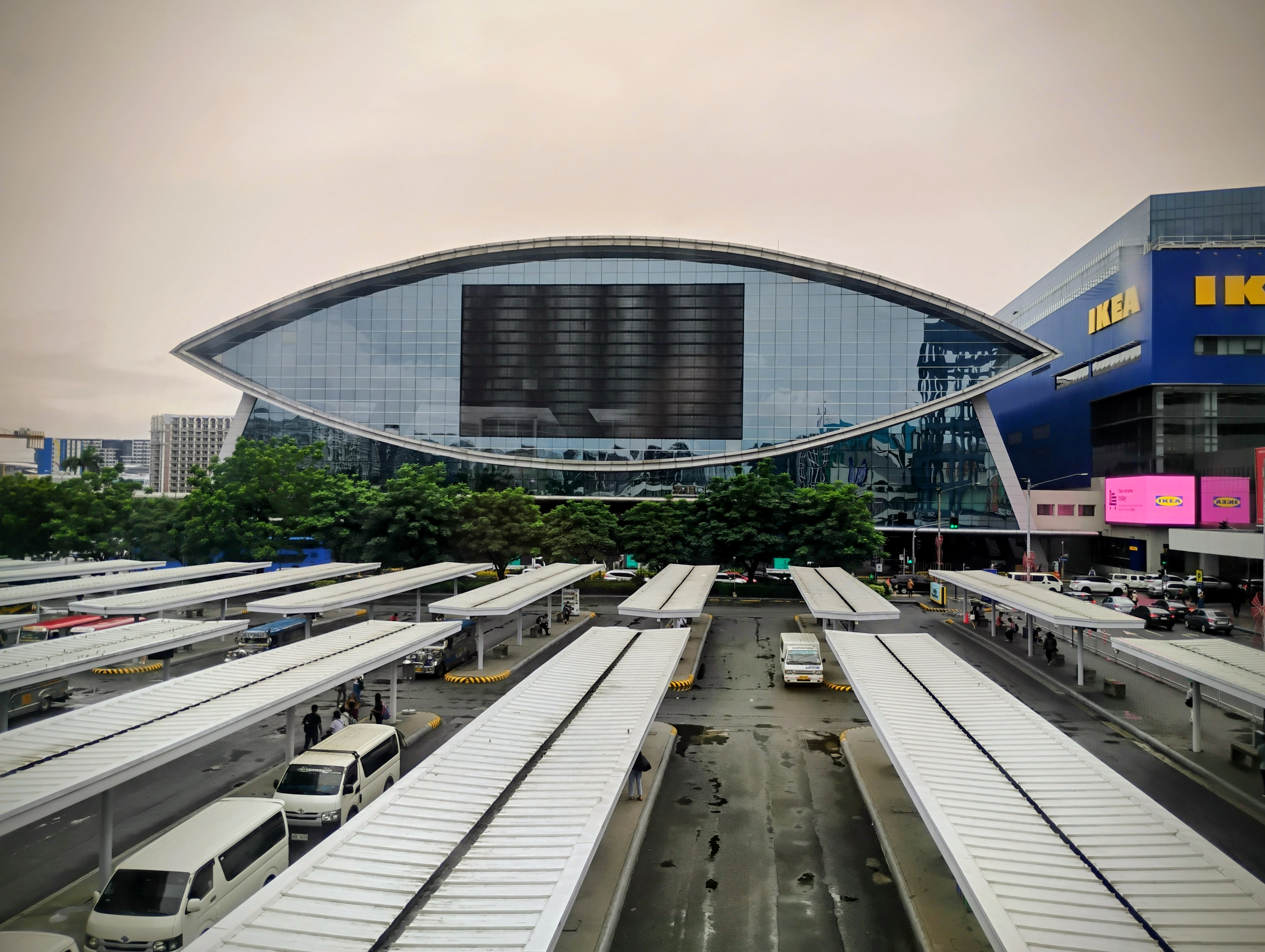
The SM Mall of Asia Arena in Pasay (pictured in 2025), the venue of the pageant.

On January 25, 2026, Miss Universe Philippines Organization began introducing updated branding for the seventh edition aligned with that of the international pageant. The following day, Mags Cue, a vice president of the organization, hinted at a "spectacular" event slated for February, later revealed to be the competition's opening press presentation. During the said event, the organization announced Misamis Occidental as the edition's host province with Pangasinan and Boracay serving as hosts for the national costume and swimsuit competitions, respectively.

On March 15, the organization scheduled the coronation night for May 1, designating the SM Mall of Asia Arena in Pasay as the venue for the fifth consecutive year. The organizers later moved the schedule to May 2, citing logistical concerns. Ronald King of King Design Studio designed the stage for this edition which he titled "Lunduyan", featuring a blueprint frame inspired by the building of the National Museum of Fine Arts in Manila.

== Selection of participants ==
Contestants from 51 localities (26 provinces, 18 cities and 7 municipalities) were selected from local and regional pageants organized by accredited partners of the competition. Voltaire Tayag, the organization's executive vice president, considered this year's batch as among the "strongest" so far. The competitors were formally announced on February 16 during a two-part event that began with a parade at the SM Mall of Asia in Pasay titled "The First Walk" and continued into a by-invitation event at the City of Dreams Manila in Parañaque titled "The Reveal".

=== Debuts and returns ===
This edition marks the debuts of cities of Dasmariñas and San Carlos, Pangasinan, the municipalities of Luisiana, Pateros, San Jose, Negros Oriental, Santo Tomas, La Union, Taal, Batangas, the provinces of Ilocos Norte, Cotabato, Mountain Province, and Sarangani, and the overseas Filipino societies in Saudi Arabia, the Canadian province of Alberta, and the U.S. cities of Bellevue, Washington and Seattle. Additionally, this edition features the returns of La Union and Rizal which both last competed in 2020; Nueva Vizcaya which last competed in 2022; Negros Oriental and Southern Leyte which both last competed in 2023; and Cabanatuan, Cebu and Palawan which all last competed in 2024.

=== Withdrawals and replacements ===
For this edition, no candidates were sent by accredited partners in Angeles City, Bago, Negros Occidental, Basey, Samar, Benguet, Batangas, Bulacan, Butuan, Caloocan, Camarines Norte, Camarines Sur, Davao Region, Dipolog, Dumaguete, Guipos, Ifugao, Ilocos Sur, Isabela, Lapu-Lapu City, Liliw, Lucena, Malay, Aklan, Naga, Camarines Sur, Naic, Oriental Mindoro, Ozamiz, Pasay, Pasig, Quezon City, Quirino, Romblon, San Fernando, Cebu, San Jose, Batangas, Siargao, and Siniloan.

Leading up to the press presentation, Cristeta Longey, who was set to represent Benguet, resigned her title and withdrew from the competition without a replacement. She cited a lack of transparency and support from her local organization as another individual was said to be undergoing training to represent the province in the pageant. According to her, the individual entered the contest representing another locality. Online personalities cited by the Philippine Daily Inquirer identified Lyneree Montero-Yodong of Mountain Province as the supposed replacement.

Midway through the competition, Kathleen Caseñas switched her locality from Batangas to Bohol. The organization for the former province previously stripped Caseñas of her title after "accumulated violations and unresolved concerns" and a communication breakdown.

=== Issues and conflicts ===
A day before the press presentation, Renee Rose Patual of Southern Leyte announced her withdrawal from the competition to prioritize her health, citing a lack of updates and support from her local organization. However, she rescinded her decision a day later after reportedly reconciling with her organization.

On March 28, the organization announced the removal of a candidate from the competition following the issuance of verbal and written guidance, decreasing the number of contestants to 50. Due to her omission in promotional material and absence in the preliminary competition, media outlets speculated that Imelda Schweighart of Kalibo, Aklan, was the sanctioned individual. The organizers denied the speculations and withheld the identity of the disqualified contestant pending the resolution of legal proceedings. Schweighart would later be announced as a candidate to the MGI All Stars 1st Edition more than a week later. Just before the coronation night, she withdrew from the competition after settling with the organizers.

== Results ==
=== Placements ===
Map of the participating localities and the placements of their respective delegates. Color key Winner Top 7 Top 15 Top 30 Unplaced Did not compete

Placement	Contestant
Miss Universe Philippines 2026	La Union – Bea Millan-Windorski
Top 7	Cebu – Nicole Borromeo; Cebu City – Apriel Smith; Pampanga – Allyson Hetland; Sultan Kudarat – Jenrose Javier (Note: Automatically advanced to the Top 7 as the People's Choice Awardee); Taguig – Bella Ysmael; Tarlac – Marian Arellano
Top 15	Baguio – Roxie Baeyens; Camiguin – Erica Cadayday; Iloilo City – Zestah Espinosa; Negros Occidental – Alex Colmenares; Manila – Justine Felizarta (Note: Advanced to the Top 30 as a winner of a brand award); Muntinlupa – Adela-Mae Marshall (Note: Automatically advanced to the Top 15 as the first runner-up for the People's Choice Award); Quezon – Ella Evangelista; Tacloban – Jacqueline Gulrajani
Top 30	Albay – Alexandra Oriño; Cavite – Jencel Caña; Cotabato – Clarissa Westram (Note: Advanced to the Top 30 as a wildcard); Iligan – Trexy Roxas; Ilocos Norte – Charieze Cacayorin; Laguna – Ysabel Prats; Luisiana – Ashley Subijano; Mountain Province – Lyneree Montero-Yodong; Pangasinan – Donna Nuguid; Rizal – Alicia Buendia; Samar Island – Catherine Wardle; San Jose, Negros Oriental – Jayka Munsayac; Santo Tomas, La Union – Rachel-Hanna Gozum; Sarangani – Nicole Cruz (Note: Advanced to the Top 30 as the second runner-up for the People's Choice Award); Tandag – Chrystel Correos

=== Appointments ===
On May 10, The Miss Philippines organization appointed candidates from this batch to compete in different international beauty pageants as titleholders.

Title	Contestant	International Placement
The Miss Philippines Supranational 2027	Pampanga – Allyson Hetland	TBD – Miss Supranational 2027
The Miss Philippines Worldwide 2027	Cebu – Nicole Borromeo	TBD – Miss Worldwide 2027
The Miss Philippines Eco International 2027	Sultan Kudarat – Jenrose Javier	TBD – Miss Eco International 2027
The Miss Philippines Cosmo 2026	Taguig – Bella Ysmael	TBD – Miss Cosmo 2026
The Miss Philippines Charm 2026	Cebu City – Apriel Smith	TBD – Miss Charm 2026
The Miss Philippines Tourism World 2026	Tarlac – Marian Arellano	TBD – Miss Tourism World 2026
The Miss Philippines Teen Universe 2026	Samar Island – Catherine Wardle	2nd Runner-Up – Miss Teen Universe 2026
The Miss Philippines Eco Teen 2026	Iligan – Trexy Roxas	Top 11 – Miss Eco Teen International 2026

=== Special awards ===
Before the winner was announced, three special awards were given.

Award	Contestant
Miss Congeniality	Las Piñas – Avegail Kultsar
Miss Photogenic	Pateros – Kristen Marcelino
Best in Swimsuit	Manila – Justine Felizarta

=== Sponsor awards ===
A total of 24 awards were given by the pageant's sponsors. Of these, three awards—those given by Maya, Pina Beauty and Playtime Entertainment—advanced their winner to the top 30.

Award	Contestant
Faces of Mags	Baguio – Roxie Baeyens; Cebu – Nicole Borromeo; La Union – Bea Millan-Windorski; Negros Occidental – Alex Colmenares; Tacloban – Jacqueline Gulrajani
Maya Poll Winner	Manila – Justine Felizarta
Miss Abu	Cebu – Nicole Borromeo
Miss Ever Bilena	Cebu – Nicole Borromeo
Miss Great Lengths iColor	Cebu – Nicole Borromeo
Miss Zleep by Zion	Cebu – Nicole Borromeo
Miss Jell Life Beauties	Cebu – Nicole Borromeo; La Union – Bea Millan-Windorski
Miss AMORAP	La Union – Bea Millan-Windorski
Miss Aqua Boracay	La Union – Bea Millan-Windorski
Miss Belo	La Union – Bea Millan-Windorski
Miss Bench	La Union – Bea Millan-Windorski
Miss Honor 600	La Union – Bea Millan-Windorski
Miss New Moon	La Union – Bea Millan-Windorski
Miss Safatos Marikina	La Union – Bea Millan-Windorski
Miss Urban Smiles	La Union – Bea Millan-Windorski
Miss Vitress	La Union – Bea Millan-Windorski
Miss Wendy's	La Union – Bea Millan-Windorski
Miss Wuling	La Union – Bea Millan-Windorski
Miss Zion	La Union – Bea Millan-Windorski
Miss Bench Body	Pampanga – Allyson Hetland
Miss Cignal	Bohol – Kathleen Caseñas
Miss DLN	Taguig – Bella Ysmael
Miss Maya	Taguig – Bella Ysmael
Miss Pantene	Taguig – Bella Ysmael
Miss Glen Photogenic	Pateros – Kristen Marcelino
Miss Pina Beauty	Muntinlupa – Adela-Mae Marshall; Sarangani – Nicole Cruz; Sultan Kudarat – Jenrose Javier
Miss Playtime	Albay – Alexandra Oriño
Miss Tipco	Occidental Mindoro – Niel Silva
Miss Zylo by Zion	Baguio – Roxie Baeyens
Queens of Pablo	Baguio – Roxie Baeyens; Cebu City – Apriel Smith; Muntinlupa – Adela-Mae Marshall; Taguig – Bella Ysmael

=== Five Gems of Misamis Occidental awards ===
As part of the pageant's activities in Misamis Occidental, five candidates were named as the "five gems" of the province, with the first-ranked candidate being named as the local ambassadress of goodwill, and the rest being assigned to represent the province's programs in agriculture, health, social services, and education.

Award	Contestant
Ambassadress of Goodwill	Cebu – Nicole Borromeo
Ambassadress of Agriculture	Iligan – Trexy Roxas
Ambassadress of Health	Camiguin – Erica Cadayday
Ambassadress of Social Services	Nueva Vizcaya – Jacqueline Aluning
Ambassadress of Education	Cotabato – Clarissa Westram

== Pageant ==
=== Format ===
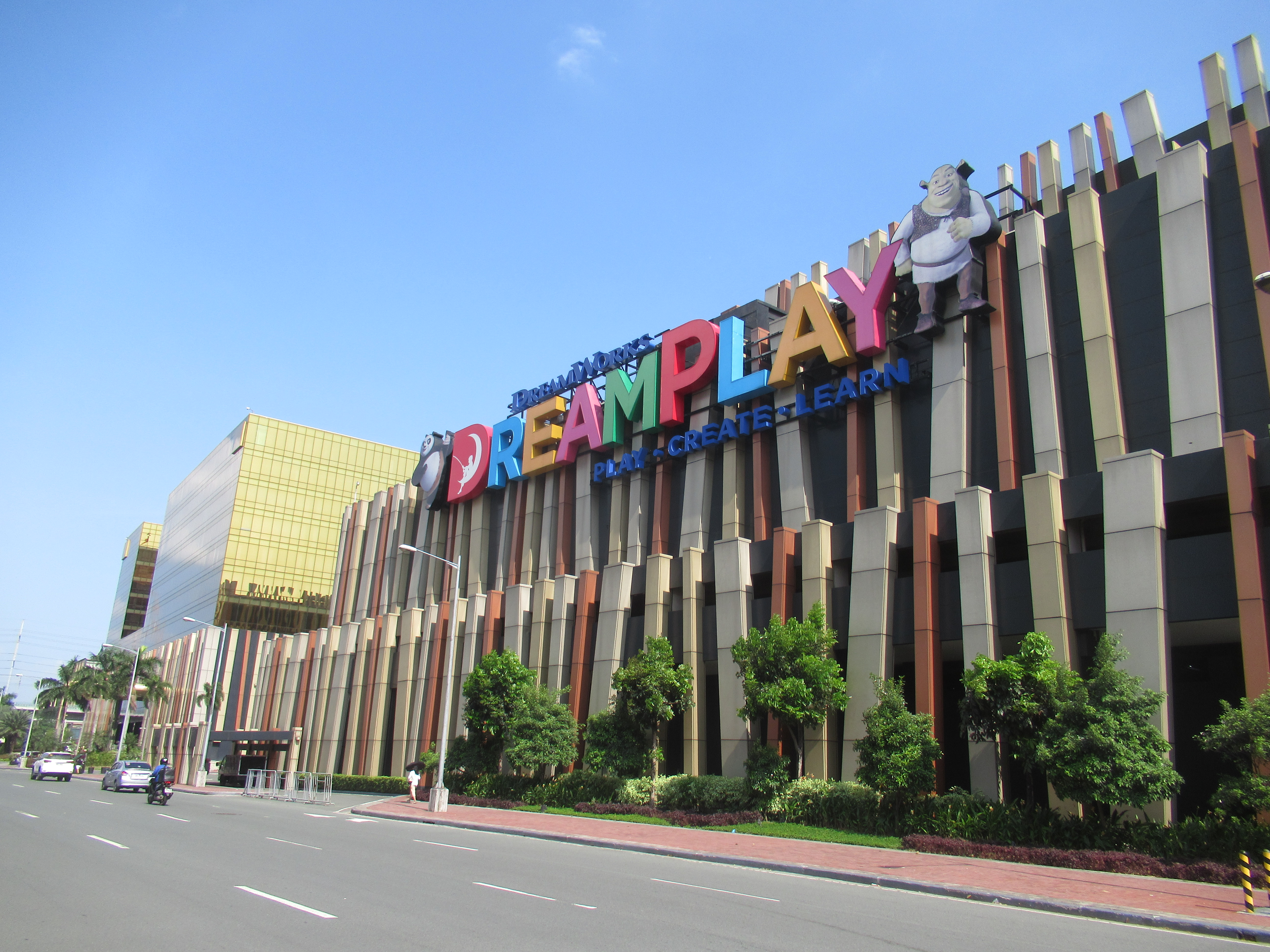
The preliminary competition was held at the City of Dreams Manila in Parañaque (pictured in 2023).

The pageant introduced a new format for the 2026 edition, which features a month-long preliminary competition composed of three rounds: evening gown, preliminary interview, and swimsuit. In each round, around ten contestants are eliminated from the pre-pageant contest: 40 delegates remain after the first round, 31 after the second, and 20 after the final round, at which point they are named semifinalists. The first half of the contestants that advance following each round are selected through public voting via the Philippine online payment app Maya, while the rest come from the selection committee’s choices.

Apart from the preliminary competition, wildcard selection and brand awards—including the People's Choice Award—each send five candidates to the semifinals. In total, 30 delegates advance to the coronation night.

On the coronation night, the semifinalists compete in the swimsuit competition, from which 15 candidates are selected to advance. Afterward, the evening gown competition trims the pool of contestants to seven, where the winner, her runners-up, are named.

=== Selection committee ===
- Carlos Garcia Candal – chief executive officer of GMG Productions (as preliminary and finals judge)
- Gazini Ganados – Miss Universe Philippines 2019 (as preliminary and finals judge)
- Ida Aldana – executive editor at Cosmopolitan Philippines (as finals judge)
- Pewee Isidro – editor-in-chief of Mega Magazine (as finals judge)
- Crystal Jacinto – founder of Villa Medica Philippines (as finals judge)
- Hayden Kho – co-chairman of Belo (as finals judge)
- Bryan Lim – vice president of Suyen Corporation (as finals judge)
- Jennylyn Mercado – actress (as finals judge)
- Rhett Eala – fashion designer (as finals judge)
- Na Zhao – Miss Universe Asia 2025 (as finals judge)
- Ariella Arida – national director and Miss Universe Philippines 2013 (as preliminary judge)
- Tes Parado Aranda – director of City of Dreams Manila (as preliminary judge)
- Joy Marcelo – vice president of Sparkle GMA Artist Center (as preliminary judge)
- Miguel Pastor - Bench corporate architect (as preliminary judge)
- Voltaire Tayag – executive vice president (as preliminary judge)

In addition to the judges, selected members of the public vote together in real time as an additional judge in each stage of the finals.

=== Presenters ===
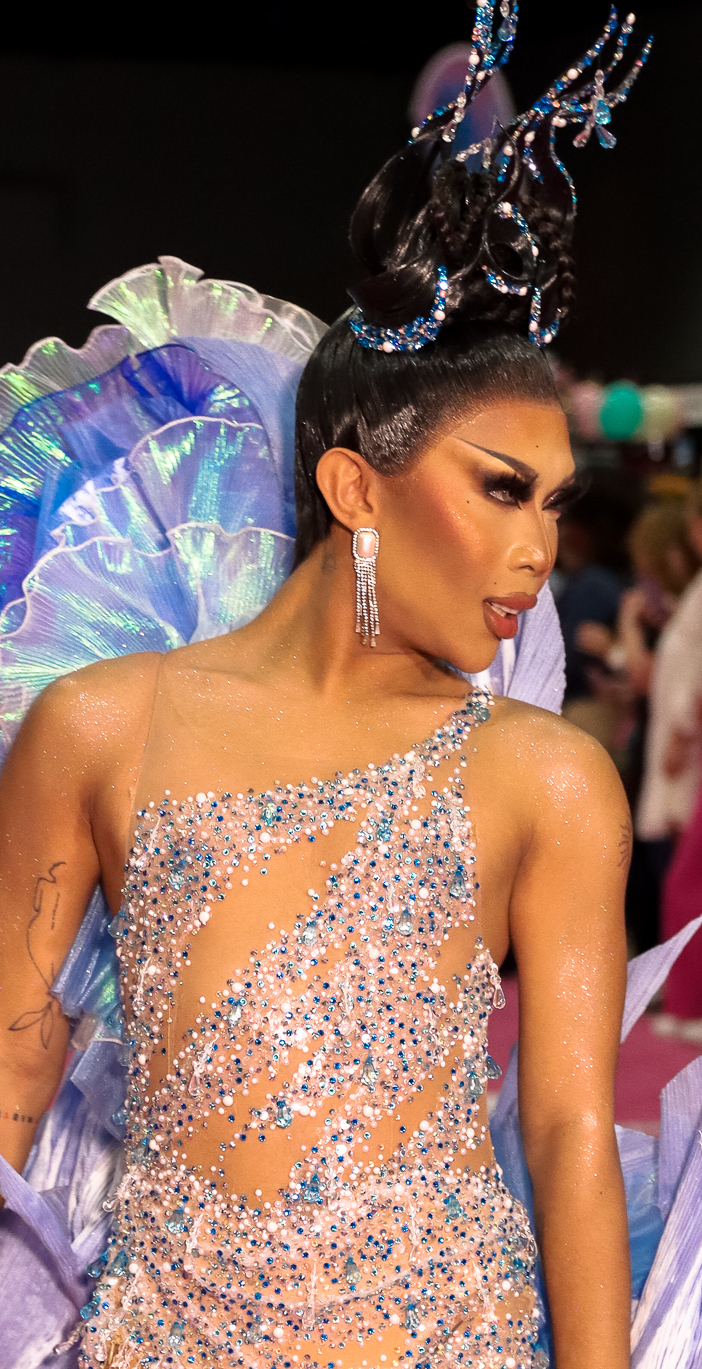
Summers is the first transgender woman to host the competition.

The finale was presented by drag performer Marina Summers, who is the first transgender woman to serve that role in the pageant's history. In addition to her, a number of "special guests" introduced the segments of the competition.

- Opening number: Ahtisa Manalo – reigning titleholder and third runner-up at Miss Universe 2025
- Introduction of executives:
  - Yllana Aduana – Miss Earth Air 2023 and second runner-up at Miss Universe Philippines 2025
  - Winwyn Marquez – Reina Hispanoamericana 2017 and first runner-up at Miss Universe Philippines 2025
- Introduction of the selection committee:
  - Gabbi Carballo – Miss Eco Philippines 2026
  - Kitt Cortez – Mister Eco Philippines 2026
- Swimsuit competition:
  - Sergio Azuaga – Man of the World 2024
  - Kirk Bondad – Mister International 2025
  - Swann Lavigne – Mister Supranational 2025
- Evening gown segment:
  - Marco Gumabao – actor and model
  - Praveenar Singh – first runner-up at Miss Universe 2025
- Commercial breaks:
  - Celeste Cortesi – Miss Universe Philippines 2022 and Miss Earth Philippines 2018
  - Katrina Llegado – Miss Supranational Philippines 2026 and Reina Hispanoamericana Filipinas 2019
  - Rabiya Mateo – Miss Universe Philippines 2020
  - Jake Cuenca – actor
- Final walk: Ralph de Leon – actor and model

=== Broadcast ===
The pageant was telecast live on One PH, with a concurrent livestream on YouTube channel of Empire Philippines and the mobile app of satellite provider Cignal. A delayed telecast will also air on TV5 the following day. All three rounds of the preceding preliminary competition were broadcast on the YouTube channels of Empire Philippines and Playtime Entertainment.

The event featured performances from P-pop group BGYO and singer Jason Dy.

== Pre-pageant events ==
=== Preliminary competition ===
External videos
- Evening Gown segment
- Preliminary Top 40 announcement
- Preliminary Interview segment
- Preliminary Top 31 announcement
- Swimsuit segment

The preliminary competition was taped behind closed doors on March 29 at the City of Dreams Manila in Parañaque, with the segments premiering weekly the following month. Each round of public voting begins after the premiere of their respective segment. Public voting for the evening gown competition ran from April 5 to 11, followed by the closed-door interviews from April 12 to 18, and the swimsuit competition from April 19 to 25.

The first ten semifinalists of the Top 20 determined by public vote were announced on April 25, while the remaining semifinalists selected by the selection committee were revealed during the finals.

==== Overall result ====
Result	Pathway	Semifinalists
Top 20 Semifinalists	Public Voting	Cavite – Jencel Caña; Ilocos Norte – Charieze Cacayorin; Negros Occidental – Alex Colmenares; Mountain Province – Lyneree Montero-Yodong; Pangasinan – Donna Nuguid; Quezon – Ella Evangelista; Rizal – Alicia Buendia; San Jose, Negros Oriental – Jayka Munsayac; Sultan Kudarat – Jenrose Javier; Tandag – Chrystel Correos
Top 20 Semifinalists	Selection Committee	Baguio – Roxie Baeyens; Cebu City – Apriel Smith; Cebu – Nicole Borromeo; Iloilo City – Zestah Espinosa; La Union – Bea Millan-Windorski; Laguna – Ysabel Prats; Pampanga – Allyson Hetland; Tacloban – Jacqueline Gulrajani; Taguig – Bella Ysmael; Tarlac – Marian Arellano

==== Elimination history ====
Eliminated candidates who advanced to the top 30 through other pathways are denoted by a dagger (‡).

Round	Eliminated
Top 40 – Evening Gown	Bacoor – Felicia Aldana; Dasmariñas – Tyra Godino; Iloilo – Nicklyn Jutay; Kalibo – Imelda Schweighart; Las Piñas – Avegail Kultsar; Leyte – Kareyl Cabahug; Parañaque – Pauline Galvez; Sarangani – Nicole Cruz ‡; Southern Leyte – Renee Rose Patual; Taal, Batangas – Juliana Hope Aquino; Tuguegarao – Janica Aquino
Top 31 – Closed-Door Interviews	Bacolod – Megan Baldevia; Bohol – Kathleen Caseñas; Iligan – Trexy Roxas ‡; Luisiana – Ashley Subijano ‡; Negros Oriental – Fatima Al-Sowyed; Palawan – Aviona Dass; Pateros – Kristen Marcelino; San Carlos, Pangasinan – Rose Albania; Santo Tomas, La Union – Rachel-Hanna Gozum ‡
Top 20 – Swimsuit	Albay – Alexandra Oriño ‡; Cabanatuan – Princess Ryla Hernandez; Camiguin – Erica Cadayday ‡; Cotabato – Clarissa Westram ‡; Los Baños, Laguna – Scarlett de Mesa; Manila – Justine Felizarta ‡; Muntinlupa – Adela-Mae Marshall ‡; Nueva Ecija – Michelle Burchelle; Nueva Vizcaya – Jacqueline Aluning; Occidental Mindoro – Neil Silva; Samar Island – Catherine Wardle ‡

=== People's Choice Award ===
Public voting for the People's Choice Award determines three semifinalists, with the awardee advancing directly to the final round and the second-placer advancing to the top 15. The competition is sponsored by skincare brand Piña Beauty, which counts select soap bar sales toward the public vote.

Placement	Contestant
People's Choice Awardee (Top 7 finalist)	Sultan Kudarat – Jenrose Javier
2nd Place (Top 15 semifinalist)	Muntinlupa – Adela-Mae Marshall
3rd Place (Top 30 semifinalist)	Sarangani – Nicole Cruz

=== National costume competition ===
The national costume competition was held on April 16 at the Urdaneta City Cultural and Sports Center in Urdaneta, Pangasinan, with Gabbi Carballo serving as the host. This year's entries were themed after the country's bodies of water, and at the end of the event, the six best designs were announced in no particular order.

Result	Contestant(s)
Top 6	Baguio – Roxie Baeyens; Iloilo – Nicklyn Jutay; Negros Occidental – Alex Colmenares; Pampanga – Allyson Hetland; Pangasinan – Donna Nuguid; Tacloban – Jacqueline Gulrajani

=== Other events ===
Leading up to the coronation night, a variety of events were held as part of the pageant. On March 22, a swimsuit show was held in Boracay which named 12 "Aqua Angels" among the candidates, who are finalists for the Miss Aqua Boracay award. On April 9, a runway show was held in Taguig which selected five finalists for the Miss Ever Bilena award, with the winner receiving a cash prize of ₱10,000 and brand products worth ₱20,000. During the pageant's activities in Misamis Occidental, the delegates competed in a special swimsuit competition on April 24 for a cash prize of ₱300,000 and the tourism ambassadorship of the province. The top eight candidates from the show, including the winner, are also named Queens of Amorap.

Award	Results		
Award	Miss Aqua Boracay	Winner	La Union – Bea Millan-Windorski
Finalists	Miss Aqua Boracay	Baguio – Roxie Baeyens; Cebu – Nicole Borromeo; Cebu City – Apriel Smith; Iloilo City – Zestah Espinosa; Manila – Justine Felizarta; Muntinlupa – Adela-Mae Marshall; Pampanga – Allyson Hetland; Sultan Kudarat – Jenrose Javier; Tacloban – Jacqueline Gulrajani; Taguig – Bella Ysmael; Tarlac – Marian Arellano	
Miss Ever Bilena	Winner	Cebu – Nicole Borromeo	
Miss Ever Bilena	Finalists	Baguio – Roxie Baeyens; Cebu City – Apriel Smith; La Union – Bea Millan-Windorski; Taguig – Bella Ysmael	
Ambassadress of Misamis Occidental	Winner	La Union – Bea Millan-Windorski	
Ambassadress of Misamis Occidental	Finalists	Cebu – Nicole Borromeo; Cebu City – Apriel Smith; Laguna – Ysabel Prats; Pampanga – Allyson Hetland; Sultan Kudarat – Jenrose Javier; Taguig – Bella Ysmael; Tarlac – Marian Arellano	

== Contestants ==
Contestants from 50 localities competed for the title.

Locality (Note: A total of 12 contestants qualified for the national competition through pageants held in Overseas Filipino Societies. They were required to represent a Philippine locality at the same time. Their chosen localities are listed first, followed by their overseas society in parentheses.)	Contestant	Age (Note: Ages at the time of the competition)	Hometown	Notes
Albay	Alexandra Oriño	21	Naga	
Bacolod	Megan Baldevia	23	Silay	
Bacoor	Felicia Aldana	23	General Trias	Competed at Mutya ng Pilipinas 2024 representing Las Piñas
Baguio	Roxie Baeyens	28	Baguio	Winner of Miss Philippines Earth 2020; Elemental Titleholder at Miss Earth 2020
Bohol	Kathleen Caseñas	22	Calaca	Entered the competition representing Batangas
Cabanatuan (Alberta, Canada)	Ryla Hernandez	22	Calgary	
Camiguin	Erica Cadayday	23	Mambajao	
Cavite	Jencel Caña	25	Dasmariñas	
Cebu	Nicole Borromeo	25	Carcar	Winner of Binibining Pilipinas International 2022; 3rd Runner-Up at Miss International 2023
Cebu City	Apriel Smith	29	Cebu City	Top 15 at Binibining Pilipinas 2016; Top 16 at Miss Universe Philippines 2020, representing Cebu
Cotabato	Clarissa Westram	24	Kabacan	
Dasmariñas	Tyra Godino	21	Ternate	
Iligan	Trexy Roxas	19	Iligan	
Ilocos Norte (Hawaii, U.S.)	Charieze Cacayorin	23	Paoay	
Iloilo	Nicklyn Jutay	24	Tigbauan	Competed at Binibining Pilipinas 2024
Iloilo City	Zestah Espinosa	21	Anilao	Competed in Miss Pearl of the Orient Philippines 2024, representing Guimaras
La Union	Bea Millan-Windorski	23	San Juan	Winner of Miss Earth USA 2024; Elemental Titleholder at Miss Earth 2024
Laguna	Ysabel Prats	18	Santa Rosa	
Las Piñas (Florida, U.S.)	Avegail Kultsar	35	Orlando	
Leyte	Kareyl Cabahug	21	Javier	
Los Baños, Laguna	Scarlett de Mesa	31	Los Baños	Supplemental Titleholder at Top Model of the World 2025
Luisiana, Laguna	Ashley Subijano	25	Luisiana	Winner of Miss Eco Philippines 2022; Top 21 at Miss Eco International 2023
Manila	Justine Felizarta	31	Padada	Top 15 at Binibining Pilipinas 2015; Competed at Binibining Pilipinas 2021; 1st Runner-Up at Miss Tourism World 2022
Mountain Province	Lyneree Montero-Yodong	28	Tuba	
Muntinlupa	Adela-Mae Marshall	28	Muntinlupa	Runner-up of Philippines' Next Top Model season 2 and Asia's Next Top Model season 6
Negros Occidental	Alex Colmenares	22	La Carlota	
Negros Oriental	Fatima Al-Sowyed	32	Dumaguete	Winner of Miss Bikini Philippines 2015; Elemental Titleholder at Miss Philippines Earth 2016, representing Dumaguete
Nueva Ecija (United Kingdom)	Michelle Burchell	27	Dartford	
Nueva Vizcaya (Washington, U.S.)	Jaqueline Aluning	28	Bayombong	
Occidental Mindoro	Neil Silva	22	Sablayan	
Palawan	Aviona Dass	20	Narra	Member of P-Pop group Raya
Pampanga	Allyson Hetland	24	Angeles City	
Pangasinan	Donna Nuguid	24	Dagupan	
Parañaque (Los Angeles, California, U.S.)	Pauline Galvez	25	Los Angeles	
Pateros	Kristen Marcelino	19	Pateros	
Quezon (Australia)	Ella Evangelista	30	Padre Burgos	
Rizal (Southern California, U.S.)	Alicia Buendia	19	Santa Clarita	
Samar Island	Catherine Wardle	18	Catbalogan	
San Carlos, Pangasinan	Rose Albania	19	San Carlos	
San Jose, Negros Oriental (Bellevue, Washington, U.S.)	Jayka Munsayac	23	Bellevue	
Santo Tomas, La Union (Seattle, Washington, U.S.)	Rachel-Hanna Gozum	22	Seattle	
Sarangani (Saudi Arabia)	Nicole Cruz	27	Kiamba	
Southern Leyte	Renee Rose Patual	24	Anahawan	
Sultan Kudarat	Jenrose Javier	20	Isulan	
Taal, Batangas (Northern California, U.S.)	Juliana Hope Aquino	20	Manila	
Tacloban	Jacqueline Gulrajani	31	Tacloban	
Taguig	Bella Ysmael	29	Taguig	1st Runner-Up at Miss Universe Philippines 2020, representing Parañaque
Tandag	Chrystel Correos	25	Tandag	Top 15 at Miss Philippines Earth 2023; 4th Runner-Up at Miss Planet International 2024
Tarlac	Marian Arellano	22	Pura	
Tuguegarao	Janica Aquino	24	Peñablanca	

== Reception ==
Early on, the pageant received criticism online for using artificial intelligence (AI) in creating moving visuals for the swimsuit and evening gown portraits of the contestants. Ian Peter Guanzon of the Cebu Daily News reported concerns over consent in the production of the visuals, as the likeness of the contestants may be stored in external servers to train AI models.

The production design received positive reviews from publications. Jojo Gabinete of PEP praised the design for its "Pilipinong-Pilipino" aesthetic drawn from influences from the Filipino creative industry.
