= Apriel Smith =

Filipino beauty pageant

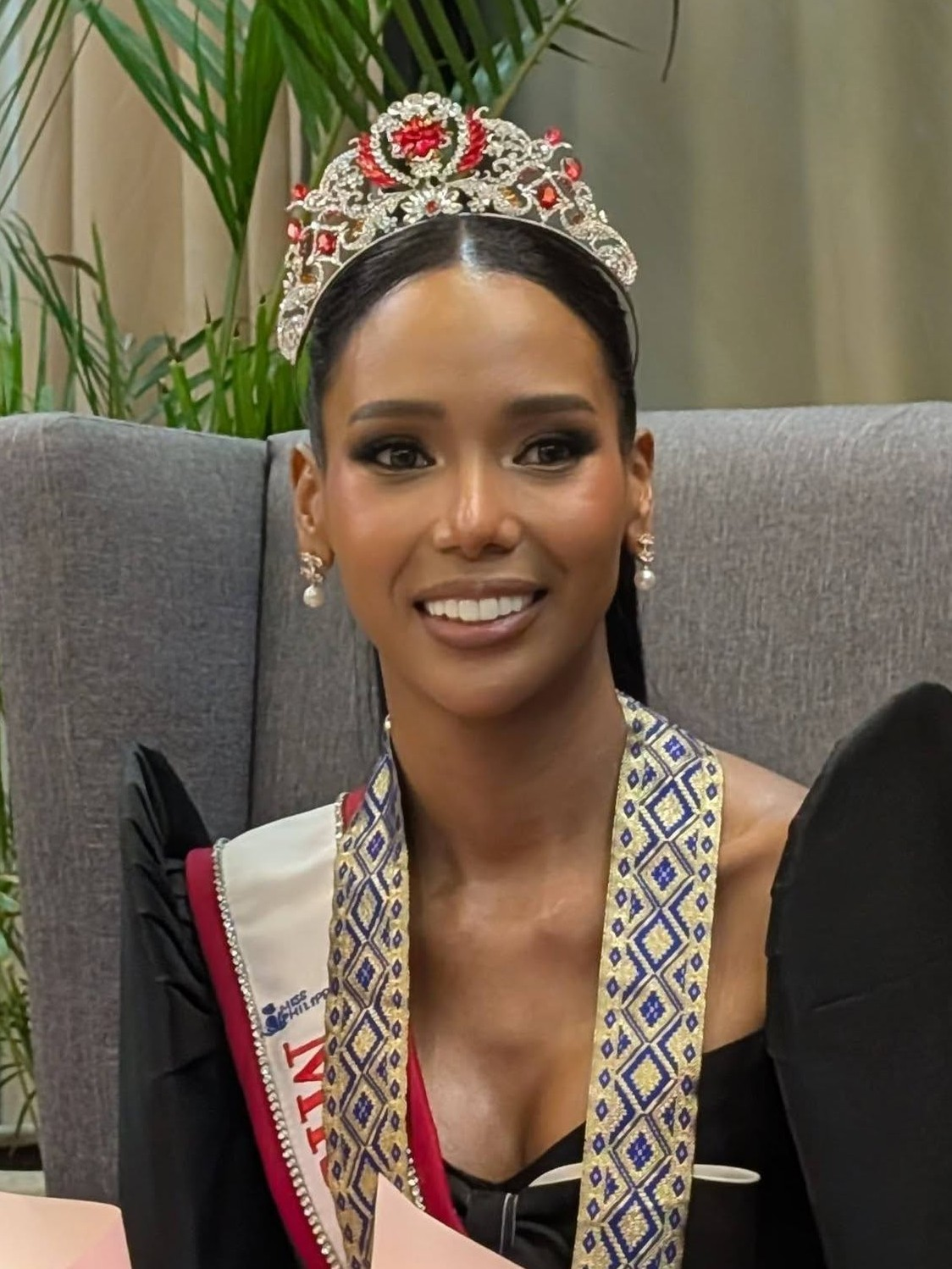
- Smith in 2026
- Born: Apriel Deguilmo Smith; October 29, 1995 (age 30); Cebu City, Philippines
- Education: University of San Carlos (BS)
- Beauty pageant titleholder
- Title: Miss Philippines Charm 2026
- Major competitions: Binibining Pilipinas 2016; (Top 15); Miss Universe Philippines 2020; (Top 16); Miss Universe Philippines 2026; (Top 7); Miss Charm 2026; (TBD)

Apriel Deguilmo Smith (born October 29, 1995) is a Filipino beauty queen who was appointed Miss Charm Philippines 2026. She will represent the Philippines at Miss Charm 2026.

Smith entered national pageantry with her stint in Binibining Pilipinas 2016, which was followed by her victory at Binibining Cebu 2017. She competed twice at Miss Universe Philippines: in 2020 and 2026, reaching the finals in her latter stint, qualifying her for a national title under its sister organization, The Miss Philippines.

== Early life and education ==
Smith was born on October 29, 1995. She is the youngest of four siblings and the only daughter of her family. Her father is Daryl Smith, an imported African-American Philippine Basketball Association player. Her name is derived from "April", her father's birth month; her mother added an "e" to her name to continue the pattern of giving their children names containing that letter. Smith was active with volleyball in her upbringing.

In 2007, Danny Booc, an agent of model agency Ozar Model Philippines, approached Smith while she was running household errands. He invited her to his agency for training and later became her mentor and manager. She went on to enter the beauty camp Aces and Queens as a trainee.

Smith studied at Abellana National School. During her time in that school, she participated at the Milo Little Olympics, where she won "Best Muse". At university, she studied tourism management at the University of San Carlos.

== Pageantry ==
=== Local pageants ===
During Sinulog in 2012, she represented Lumad Basakanon of Basak San Nicolas, Cebu City, at the Festival Queen competition, where she was named the winner. In May 2013, Smith competed at Miss Mandaue 2013, where she finished as third runner-up to Steffi Aberasturi. Afterward, she proceeded to compete and win in a number of local pageants, including Miss Cebu City Olympics 2012, Miss Badian 2015, and Miss San Fernando 2015.

=== Binibining Pilipinas 2016 ===
In February 2016, Smith qualified for Binibining Pilipinas 2016, her first national pageant. She finished in the top 15.

=== 2017–2019: Return to local pageants ===
Following her stint in Binibining Pilipinas, she represented Badian in the inaugural Binibining Cebu 2017, where she was named the winner, receiving a cash prize of ₱500,000, gifts worth ₱300,000, and ₱200,000 in funds for her hometown.

While publications and her supporters expected her to compete in Binibining Pilipinas 2019 following her reign, she deferred her return to national pageantry to 2020. She continued her run in local and regional pageants, competing at Miss Isabel 2019 in Leyte and Miss Zamboanga 2019 and being named the winner in the former pageant.

=== Miss Universe Philippines 2020 ===
On January 30, 2020, Smith submitted her application to compete in the inaugural edition of Miss Universe Philippines as the representative of Cebu.

Smith collaborated with Mark Bumgarner for a modern white terno design for the evening gown competition. During the finals, she advanced to the top 16, where she and her co-candidates were asked about how they can create a "positive and lasting impact". She shared her sense of purpose and willingness to uplift others. She did advance to the next round, with Rabiya Mateo of Iloilo City winning the title.

=== Miss Universe Philippines 2026 ===
Following her debut stint, Smith remained open to making a return to national competitions. On February 1, 2026, the accredited partner of Cebu for the pageant appointed Smith as their delegate for Cebu City for the 2026 edition alongside Nicole Borromeo, who represented the wider province. Following their appointments, publications named both of them as frontrunners in the contest.

Smith competed in the preliminary evening gown competition with a design by Oscar James Arias titled "Pink Lotus", which sought to represent "modern femininity". Art Don designed her entry to the national costume competition titled "Queen of the Sacred Waters", which drew inspiration from fluvial processions honoring the Christ Child.

Smith qualified for the top 30 through the selection committee' choices and progressed through the top 15 and top 7. During the evening gown competition, she competed in a white design by Harvey Cenit. During the final question-and-answer portion, she was asked about the importance of representing the Philippines on the global stage despite the citizens' frustration over their country. In her response, she narrated her experience as an overseas Filipino worker and empathized with her compatriots' frustration. She called for her listeners "to don't stop raising our flag" and stated that the "Philippines is worth believing in".

She finished as a top 7 finalist, with Bea Millan-Windorski of La Union winning the competition.

=== Miss Charm 2026 ===
In May 2026, The Miss Philippines organization appointed Smith as Miss Charm Philippines 2026, allowing her to represent the country in Miss Charm 2026.

== Public image ==
Her mentor Danny Booc has dubbed Smith as the "Black Barbie of Cebu".

== Advocacy ==
Smith is a sports and wellness advocate. During her tenure as Binibining Cebu, she organized a number of initiatives promoting sports, including the Binibining Cebu Pinoy Olympics held in Badian.

== Personal life ==
As of February 2026, Smith worked as an overseas Filipino worker in Singapore for three years.

Awards and achievements
Preceded by Cyrille Payumo (Pampanga)	Miss Charm Philippines; 2026	Incumbent
