= Miss Iloilo =

Filipino beauty pageant competition

- Predecessor: Miss Dinagyang (1970s–2020)
- Formation: 2020
- Type: Beauty pageant
- Headquarters: Iloilo City
- Location: Philippines

Miss Iloilo is an annual beauty pageant in Iloilo City, Philippines. It is held every January during the Dinagyang Festival. It is organized by the Iloilo City Government and the Iloilo Festivals Foundation, Inc. (IFFI).

The reigning Miss Iloilo is Zestah Shalom Espinosa from the municipality of Anilao, who was crowned on January 17, 2026, at the WVSU Cultural Center in La Paz, Iloilo City, Philippines.

== History ==
Miss Iloilo was first staged in 2020, replacing the long-running Miss Dinagyang beauty pageant, which had been held since the 1970s. The pageant was established to select official representatives of Iloilo City for major national competitions. Winners of Miss Iloilo earn the opportunity to represent the city in three of the country's most prestigious national pageants: Miss Universe Philippines, Binibining Pilipinas, and Miss Philippines Earth. These competitions, in turn, determine the Philippines' representatives for the international Miss Universe, Miss International and Miss Earth pageants, respectively.

== Titleholders ==
The list of winners is from the current and new titles of Miss Iloilo only and does not include the previous titles of Miss Dinagyang.

Year	Miss Iloilo	Represented	National Pageant	Special award(s)	Ref.
2020	Rabiya Mateo	Balasan	Winner – Miss Universe Philippines 2020; Miss Universe 2020 Top 21	Best in Talent	
2021	No competition held due to the COVID-19 pandemic (Note: The representatives of Iloilo City for the national pageants in 2021 were selected from the runner-ups of Miss Iloilo 2020. Kheshapornam Ramachandran, the first runner-up of Miss Iloilo 2020, represented Iloilo City in Miss Universe Philippines 2021.)				
2022	Dorothy Marie Gemillan	La Paz	Top 16 – Miss Universe Philippines 2022	Best in Evening Gown	
2023	Raniele Shaine Saulog	Cabatuan	Top 10 – The Miss Philippines 2023 (Note: Miss Iloilo 2023 Raniele Shaine Saulog was also crowned as Miss Iloilo – World. However, she participated in the first-ever edition of The Miss Philippines instead, held on October 24, 2023.)	Best in Themed Costume	
2024	Alexie Mae Brooks	Leon	Top 10 – Miss Universe Philippines 2024; Appointed - Miss Eco Philippines 2025; Miss Eco International 2025	Best in Swimsuit; Best in Designer’s Fashion Show; Best in Cultural Costume	
2025	Karen Nicole Piccio	Maasin	Unplaced – Miss Universe Philippines 2025	Best in Introduction Video; Best in Advocacy and Tourism Video; Best Runway Model; Best in Closed-Door Interview; Best in Gastronomy Costume	
2026	Zestah Shalom Espinosa	Anilao	Top 15 – Miss Universe Philippines 2026	Best in Gown; Best in Swimsuit; Best in Introduction Video	
