= Bella Ysmael =

Filipino beauty pageant titleholder

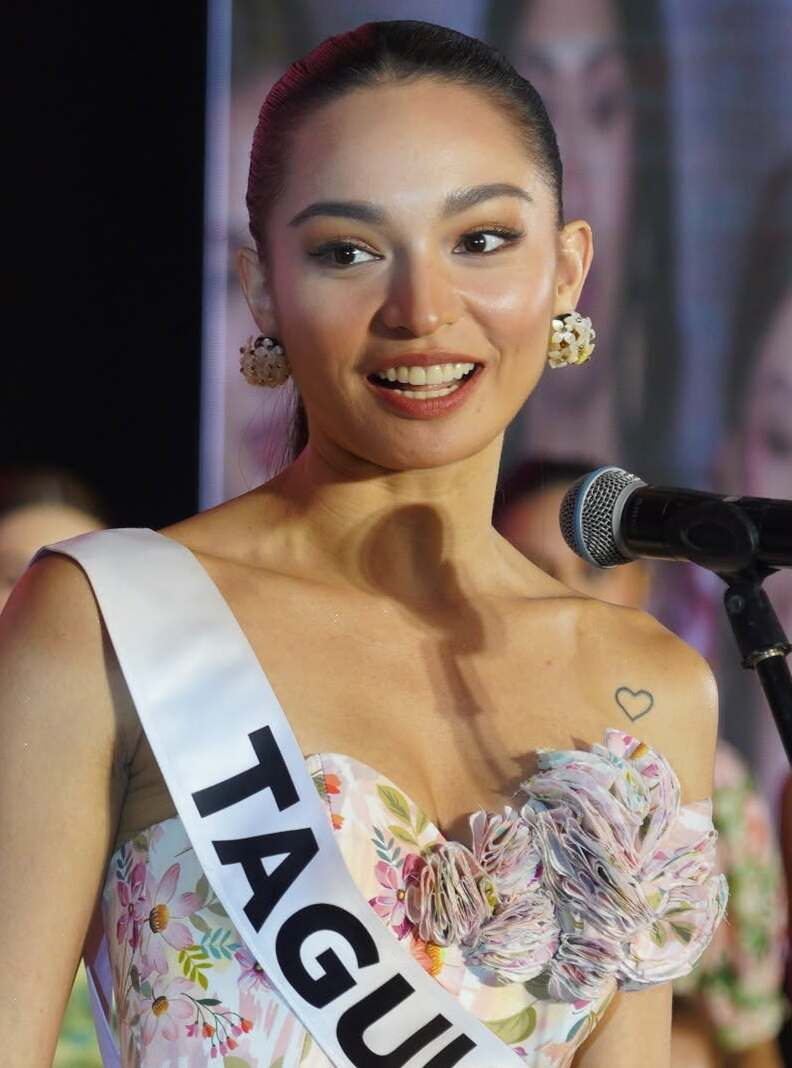
- Ysmael in 2026
- Born: Maria Ysabella Roxas Ysmael; August 8, 1996 (age 30)
- Education: De La Salle University (BA)
- Occupation: Ballerina
- Relatives: Marita Zobel (grandmother); Margie Moran (aunt)
- Beauty pageant titleholder
- Title: Miss Cosmo Philippines 2026
- Major competitions: Miss Universe Philippines 2020; (1st Runner-Up); Miss Universe Philippines 2026; (Top 7); Miss Cosmo 2026; (TBD)

Maria Ysabella "Bella" Roxas Ysmael (born August 8, 1996) is a Filipino beauty pageant titleholder who won Miss Cosmo Philippines 2026. She will represent the Philippines at Miss Cosmo 2026. She competed twice and reached the finals of Miss Universe Philippines in 2020 and 2026.

== Early life and education ==
Maria Ysabella Roxas Ysmael was born on August 8, 1996, to The Breed vocalist Charlie Ysmael and Ika Roxas. Her family includes several personalities active in the entertainment industry; her grandmother is actress Marita Zobel and her aunt is Miss Universe 1973 Margie Moran. She has trained in ballet since the age of four and has explored other genres of dance, including contemporary ballet and hip-hop. At the time of Miss Universe Philippines 2020, she was part of the Hampton Court Ballet.

Ysmael studied psychology at the De La Salle University, and graduated with a Bachelor of Arts in 2017. In 2015, while at university, she interned for Metro Magazine. Afterward, she held corporate roles at Louis Vuitton Philippines and Salico PH.

== Pageantry ==
In 2014, Ysmael won Binibining Parañaque. In 2018, she was first runner-up in the fitness competition Century Tuna Superbods, in the female category.

Ysmael represented Parañaque and was first runner-up at the inaugural Miss Universe Philippines 2020 contest. In the preliminary competition, she won the Best in Evening Gown award, wearing a gown designed by Dubai-based Filipino designer Furne One. She wore one of his gowns for the finals. Following the competition, she was named Ambassador for Arts and Culture.

In 2026 she appointed to represent Taguig at Miss Universe Philippines 2026,, where she reached the top seven. She wore gowns by Rian Fernandez. In the preliminary rounds, an iridescent design, and final rounds, a white and gold design.

In May 2026, The Miss Philippines organization appointed Ysmael as Miss Cosmo Philippines 2026, allowing her to represent the country at Miss Cosmo 2026.

== Advocacies and causes ==
Ysmael is a mental health advocate, and draws from her educational background in psychology.

== Personal life ==
Ysmael and Summer Go, co-founded the Milota Ballet ballet school, where she has worked as a ballet instructor. In 2025, she founded the sunglasses brand Ysle Society.

Awards and achievements
Preceded by Chelsea Fernandez (Sultan Kudarat)	Miss Cosmo Philippines; 2026	Incumbent
New title	Miss Universe Philippines; 1st Runner-Up; 2020	Succeeded by Maureen Wroblewitz (Pangasinan)
New title	Miss Universe Philippines; Best in Evening Gown; 2020	Succeeded by Beatrice Gomez (Cebu City)
