= Kevin Montillano =

Filipino singer, content creator, and television host

- Kevin Montillano in 2025
- Born: Kevin Montillano; December 23, 1995 (age 30); Laguna, Philippines
- Education: Laguna State Polytechnic University
- Occupations: Singer; content creator; television host
- Years active: 2020–present
- Musical career
- Genres: OPM; pop; alternative
- Instrument: Vocals
- Labels: Cornerstone Entertainment (2020–2025); KDR Music House (2025–present)

Kevin Montillano (born December 23, 1995) is a Filipino singer, content creator, and television host. He first gained mainstream attention as one of the performers at the coronation night of Miss Universe Philippines 2020, alongside Jessica Sanchez, Allen Cecilio, and Anjo Damiles. He is also known as a featured performer in JM Bales' viral hit "Magandang Dilag."

A popular content creator known on TikTok as "Nokokohiyo Boy" for his comedy skits about friendships featuring the catchphrase "Nokokohiyo nomon!", Montillano has amassed over 1.1 million followers on the platform, where he shares music performances, skits, and lifestyle content. He served as a PIE Jock (host) on PIE Channel from 2022 to 2023, hosting shows including Pera o Bayong (PoB), PIEnalo, Shoutout TV, and Matching Matching.

== Early life ==
Montillano was born on December 23, 1995, and grew up in Laguna, Philippines. In 2014, he joined and won the Lakan ng Pagsanjan male beauty pageant in Pagsanjan, Laguna. In 2015, he enrolled at Laguna State Polytechnic University.

== Career ==
=== 2020: Miss Universe Philippines and early career ===
Montillano gained mainstream attention in October 2020 when he was selected as one of three performers at the coronation night of Miss Universe Philippines 2020, held at the Baguio Country Club in Baguio City. He performed alongside Allen Cecilio and Anjo Damiles, while American Idol alumna Jessica Sanchez served as the opening act. During the evening gown portion, the trio serenaded the candidates with the song "Kalawakan."

Following the pageant, Montillano signed with Cornerstone Entertainment and was featured as a performer in JM Bales' viral hit "Magandang Dilag," which further boosted his visibility in the Philippine music scene.

=== 2020–2021: Debut singles and Night Drives ===
In 2020, Montillano released his debut single "Kung Iniwan Mo Na" with music producer and composer KIKX, under ABS-CBN Music. He followed this with "Magandang Dilag" as a featured artist alongside JM Bales.

In October 2021, Montillano released "Kalawakan" as a single with Allen Cecilio and Anjo Damiles; the song, which they had performed at the Miss Universe Philippines 2020 coronation night, was released as part of the pageant's official soundtrack.

Also in 2021, Montillano released his debut album Night Drives, a 10-track record exploring personal experiences and emotions. He also released the singles "Bat Tayo Tanga," "Pwede Na Ba," and "Komplikado" during this period.

=== 2022–2023: PIE Channel and content creation ===
In May 2022, Montillano joined PIE Channel, the Philippines' first multiscreen, real-time interactive TV channel, as one of its founding PIE Jocks. He was described as the "Happy-Go-Lucky Bunso ng TroPIE" (the happy-go-lucky youngest of the group). He hosted multiple programs including Pera o Bayong (PoB) alongside Nicki Morena, Eian Rances, and Ninong Ry; PIEnalo alongside Melai Cantiveros, Sela Guia, and Negi; as well as Shoutout TV and Matching Matching.

In March 2022, Montillano hosted the Top Class kumu channel alongside singer Mark Oblea, a finalist of Pinoy Boyband Superstar, where they encouraged aspiring P-pop artists to audition for the show Top Class, a collaboration between Kumu, Cignal Entertainment, TV5, and Cornerstone Entertainment.

During this period, Montillano also rose to prominence as a TikTok content creator under the nickname "Nokokohiyo Boy," known for comedy skits about friendships featuring his catchphrase "Nokokohiyo nomon!" By early 2022, he had amassed over 818,000 followers on the platform.

In November 2023, Montillano performed as a Coke Studio Philippines artist at the Passionfest event in Bonifacio Global City, alongside fellow Coke Studio artists John Walter and dwta. In December 2023, he served as the event host for Okada Manila's New Year's Eve 2024 countdown celebration dinner concert in the Grand Ballroom.

=== 2024–2025: Television appearances ===
In March 2024, Montillano appeared on NET25's morning show Kada Umaga with content creator Euleen "Yobab" Castro, with whom he is frequently paired as a content creation duo. In September 2024, Montillano appeared on the Throwbox segment of It's Showtime on GMA Network.

In 2025, Montillano released the independent singles "Nananaginip" (July 4, 2025) and "Akin Lang" (October 31, 2025). He then signed with KDR Music House and released "Tinatangi" in December 2025 as his label debut, written by Montillano and Joelo De Castro and produced by Senoidy "SNDY" Puhawan. In December 2025, Montillano also appeared as a guest on the GMA Network comedy show Your Honor, in a holiday-themed episode alongside Euleen Castro.

=== 2026–present: KDR Music House and game show appearances ===
In January 2026, Montillano appeared on Family Feud on GMA Network as part of "Team Pataba" alongside Euleen "Yobab" Castro, Marlon Santos, and Vrix Laron.

In April 2026, Montillano released the single "alon" (meaning "wave") under KDR Music House, a track about overcoming hesitation and self-doubt. He described the song's message as: "Never doubt yourself, and never let anyone tell you you're not enough — even if that person is yourself." In August 2026, he released "Nahulog Sa'yo" featuring Cianne.

In June 2026, Montillano and Euleen "Yobab" Castro won the ₱200,000 grand prize on the GMA Network game show The People Have Spoken, competing as "Team Kebab" against "Team ChanSu" (Chanty Videla and Sugar Mercado). The pair also won the bonus round.

Also in June 2026, Montillano performed as part of the KDR Music House lineup at On Campus: Wish Bus Sessions, a collaboration between Wish 107.5 and KDR Music House held at Arellano University in Manila.

== Live shows ==
Year	Event	Venue/Location	Notes
2020	Miss Universe Philippines 2020 coronation night	Baguio Country Club, Baguio City	Performed "Kalawakan" with Allen Cecilio and Anjo Damiles
2023	Passionfest (Coke Studio Philippines)	Bonifacio Global City	Coke Studio Philippines artist; performed alongside John Walter and dwta
2023	Okada Manila New Year's Eve 2024 Countdown	Okada Manila, Grand Ballroom	Event host
2024	Gabay Guro Wellness Fest		Performer; organized by GabayGuro and mWell
2026	On Campus: Wish Bus Sessions	Arellano University, Manila	Wish 107.5 and KDR Music House collaboration

== Discography ==
=== Albums ===
Year	Title	Label
2021	Night Drives	Cornerstone Entertainment

=== Singles ===
Year	Title	Label	Notes
2020	"Kung Iniwan Mo Na"	ABS-CBN Music	with KIKX
2020	"Magandang Dilag"	Cornerstone Entertainment	Featured artist with JM Bales
2021	"Kalawakan"	Cornerstone Entertainment	with Allen Cecilio and Anjo Damiles; from the Miss Universe Philippines 2020 official soundtrack
2021	"Bat Tayo Tanga"	Cornerstone Entertainment	
2021	"Pwede Na Ba"	Cornerstone Entertainment	
2021	"Komplikado"	Cornerstone Entertainment	
2025	"Nananaginip"	Independent	Released July 4, 2025
2025	"Akin Lang"	Independent	Released October 31, 2025
2025	"Tinatangi"	KDR Music House	Label debut; released December 12, 2025
2026	"alon"	KDR Music House	Released April 24, 2026
2026	"Nahulog Sa'yo"	KDR Music House	Featuring Cianne; released August 14, 2026

== Television ==
Year	Title	Role	Network/Platform	Notes
2020	Miss Universe Philippines 2020	Himself (performer)	GMA Network	Coronation night performer alongside Jessica Sanchez, Allen Cecilio, and Anjo Damiles
2022	Top Class kumu livestream	Himself (host)	Kumu	Co-hosted with Mark Oblea
2022–2023	Pera o Bayong (PoB)	Himself (PIE Jock/host)	PIE Channel	Co-hosted with Nicki Morena, Eian Rances, and Ninong Ry
2022–2023	PIEnalo	Himself (PIE Jock/host)	PIE Channel	Co-hosted with Melai Cantiveros, Sela Guia, and Negi
2022–2023	Shoutout TV	Himself (PIE Jock/host)	PIE Channel	
2022–2023	Matching Matching	Himself (PIE Jock/host)	PIE Channel	
2024	Kada Umaga	Himself (guest)	NET25	With Euleen "Yobab" Castro
2024	It's Showtime	Himself (guest)	GMA Network	Throwbox segment
2025	Your Honor	Himself (guest)	GMA Network	Holiday episode with Euleen Castro
2026	Family Feud	Himself (contestant)	GMA Network	"Team Pataba" with Euleen Castro, Marlon Santos, and Vrix Laron
2026	The People Have Spoken	Himself (contestant)	GMA Network	Won ₱200,000 grand prize with Euleen "Yobab" Castro

== Awards and nominations ==
Year	Award	Category	Nominated work	Result
2021	34th Awit Awards	Best New Artist in a Collaboration	"Magandang Dilag" (with JM Bales)	Won
