= Imelda Schweighart =

Filipino and German actress and beauty pageant titleholder

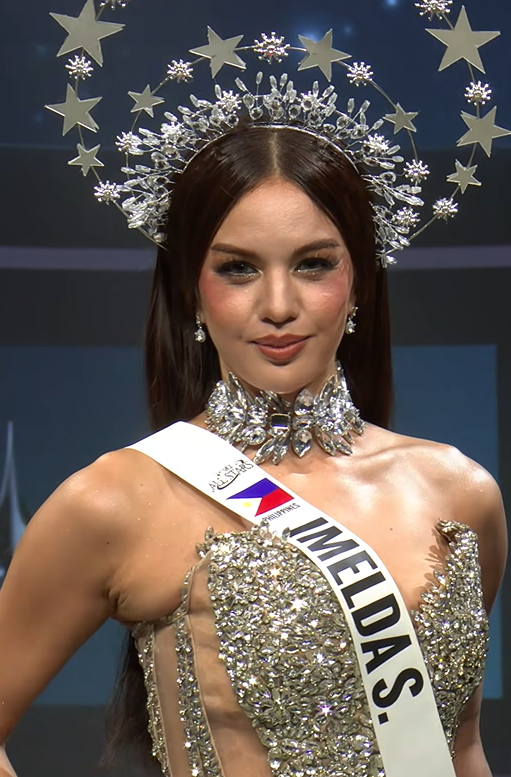
- Schweighart in 2026
- Other name: Imee Hart
- Beauty pageant titleholder
- Title: Miss Philippines Earth 2016
- Major competitions: Binibining Pilipinas 2013 (Top 15); Miss Philippines Earth 2016 (Winner; Resigned); Miss Earth 2016 (Unplaced); Miss Universe Germany 2023 (Unplaced); Miss Universe Philippines 2026 (Withdrew); MGI All Stars 1st Edition (Unplaced)

Imelda Schweighart is a Filipino and German beauty pageant titleholder who won Miss Philippines Earth 2016. She competed at Miss Earth 2016, and was unplaced. She was the Philippine contestant to the MGI All Stars 1st Edition.

Schweighart previously competed in national qualifying pageants for Miss Universe, competing in Miss Universe Germany 2023 and the Miss Universe Philippines 2026.

== Early life and career ==
Under her screen name Imee Hart, she appeared in the variety show Willing Willie, and as one of the co-hosts of Willie Revillame at 15 years old from 2010 to 2011 and was also a cast member of the youth-oriented drama series Bagets: Just Got Lucky, both aired on TV5. She was also a swimmer during her school years.

== Pageantry ==
=== Binibining Pilipinas 2013 ===
Schweighart first competed in Binibining Pilipinas 2013 and reached the top 15 in the competition. She also won the Binibining Pilipinas – PAGCOR special award.

=== 2016: Miss Earth ===
In 2016, Schweighart won Miss Philippines Earth, representing Puerto Princesa. She was crowned by her predecessor, Miss Earth 2015 Angelia Ong.

Schweighart entered Miss Earth 2016, and was unplaced, and received the Darling of the Press award. At the finals, Schweighart was unplaced, and was the country's third contestant to do so at Miss Earth. Katherine Espin of Ecuador was the winner of the pageant.

After the competition, Schweighart accused the winner, Espin, of having cosmetic surgery. She said that she had a "fake nose, fake chin, fake boobs". Following this, Schweighart resigned as Miss Earth Philippines, and apologised for her remarks, while maintaining that she was telling the truth.

Loren Artajos, who was crowned Miss Earth Philippines Water, assumed the title of Miss Philippines Earth.

=== 2023–2026: Bids to compete in Miss Universe ===
On June 27, 2023, Schweighart was announced as one of the candidates for Miss Universe Germany, where she was unplaced. Two years later, on October 14, 2025, Giselle Quimpo, the Miss Universe Philippines local director for Kalibo, Aklan, appointed Schweighart to represent the municipality in the 2026 pageant.

Schweighart became the subject of media speculation after the national organization announced the removal of a candidate in March 2026. During that time, she was omitted from promotional material for the pageant, which led media outlets to conclude that she was the candidate removed from the competition. However, the organization denied that she was disqualified from the competition and withheld the identity of the said contestant, citing pending legal proceedings.

Schweighart officially withdrew from the competition on May 2, shortly before the coronation night. She announced her withdrawal and resignation from her local title through a joint public statement with the national organization, confirming that both parties reached an agreement regarding her stint in the competition while withholding further details.

=== 2026: MGI All Stars ===
The Miss Grand International organization confirmed Schweighart as a Philippine candidate to the first edition of MGI All Stars on April 6, 2026.

== Public image ==
Media outlets including ABS-CBN, the South China Morning Post, and the Philippine Daily Inquirer have characterized Schweighart as a "controversial" beauty queen due to her outspoken attitude online which receives strong reactions on social media.

== Notes ==
Awards and achievements
Preceded by Angelia Ong (Manila)	Miss Philippines Earth; 2016 (Resigned)	Succeeded by Loren Artajos (Laoag)
