= Agimat ng Agila =

Philippine television drama series

- Title card
- Also known as: The Eagle's Quest
- Genre: Fantasy drama
- Created by: Agnes Gagelonia-Uligan; Jojo Tawalis Nones
- Written by: Jojo Tawasil Nones; John Roque
- Directed by: Rico Gutierrez
- Creative director: Aloy Adlawan
- Starring: Bong Revilla
- Theme music composer: Natasha L. Correos
- Opening theme: "Agimat ng Agila" by Jessica Villarubin and Garrett Bolden
- Country of origin: Philippines
- Original language: Tagalog
- No. of seasons: 2
- No. of episodes: 27

Production
- Executive producer: Mary Joy Lumboy-Pili
- Production locations: Tanay, Rizal; Antipolo, Rizal
- Cinematography: Nap Jamir III; Armin Collado
- Camera setup: Multiple-camera setup
- Running time: 23–28 minutes
- Production company: GMA Entertainment Group

Original release
- Network: GMA Network
- Release: May 1, 2021 – May 7, 2022

Agimat ng Agila (transl. talisman of eagle / international title: The Eagle's Quest) is a Philippine television drama fantasy series broadcast by GMA Network. Directed by Rico Gutierrez, it stars Bong Revilla. It premiered on May 1, 2021 on the network's Sabado Star Power sa Gabi line up. The series concluded on May 7, 2022, with a total of two seasons and 27 episodes.

The series is streaming online on YouTube and iQIYI.

== Cast and characters ==
Cast

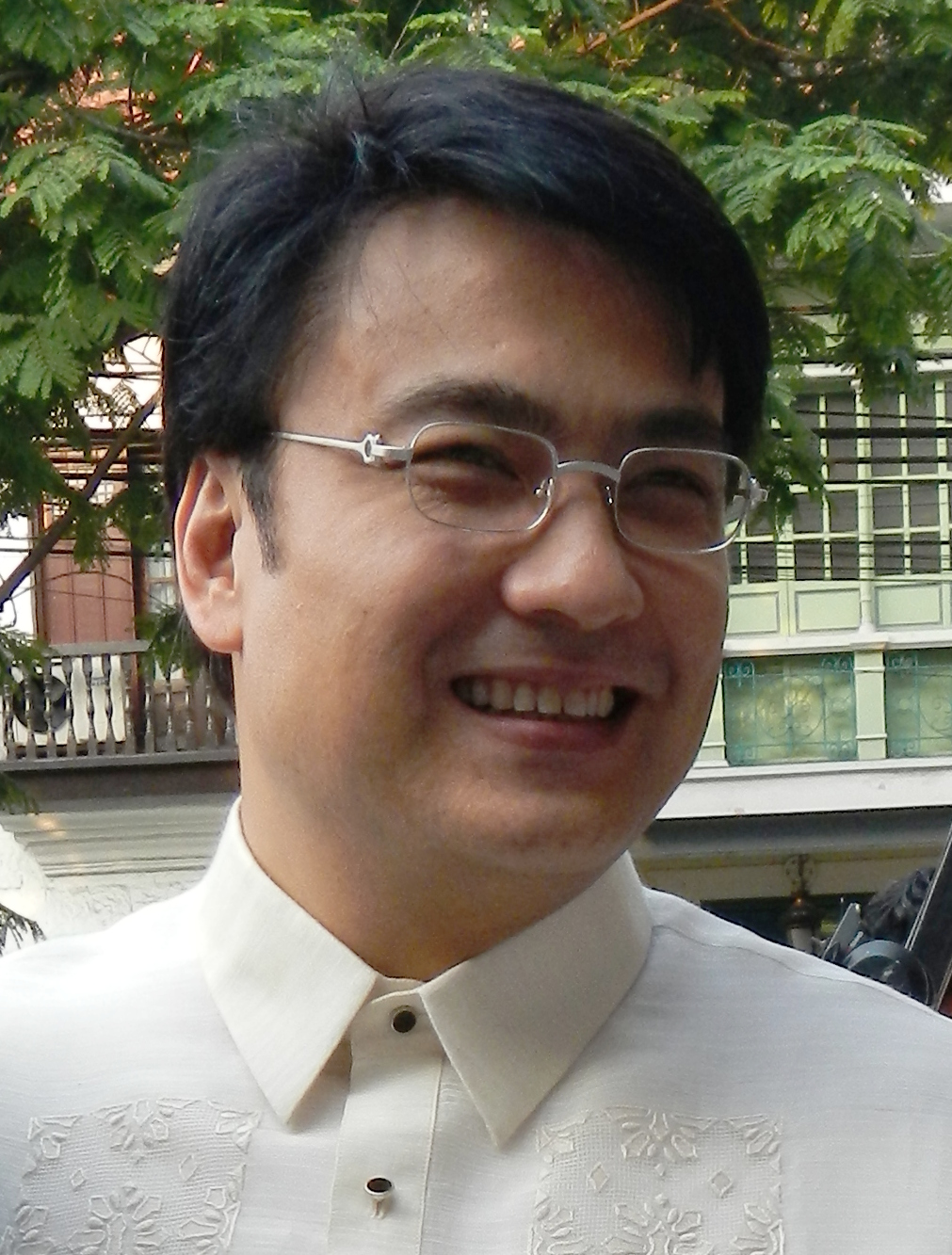
Bong Revilla

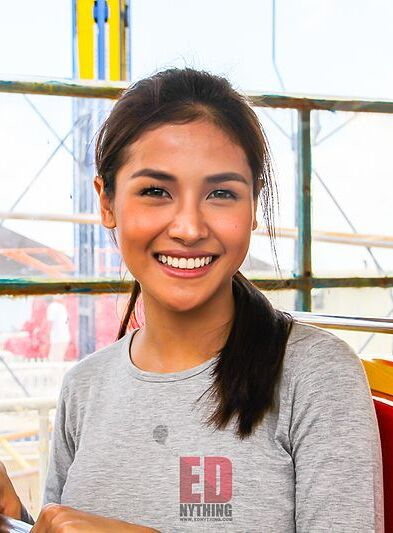
Sanya Lopez

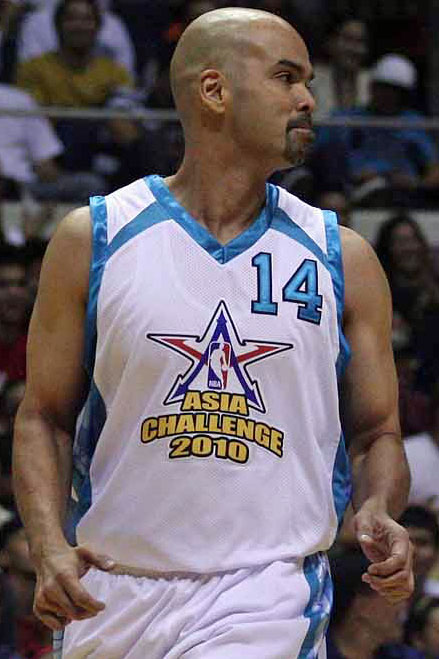
Benjie Paras

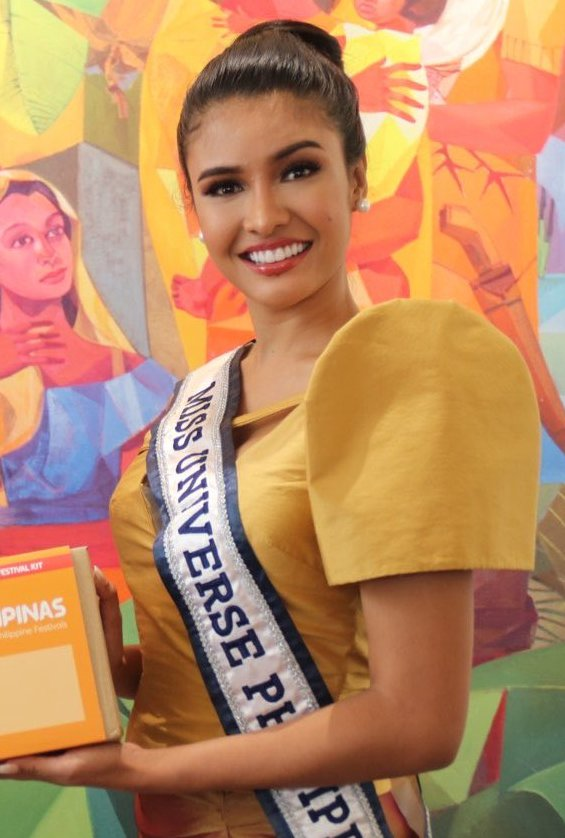
Rabiya Mateo

Lead cast

- Bong Revilla as Gabriel Labrador

Supporting cast

- Sanya Lopez as Maya Lagman (season 1, guest season 2)
- Elizabeth Oropesa as Roberta "Berta" Lagman
- Roi Vinzon as Alejandro Dominguez (season 1)
- Benjie Paras as Wesley Dimanahan
- Allen Dizon as Gerry Flores (season 1, guest season 2)
- Michelle Dee as Serpenta
- Edgar Allan Guzman as Julian (season 1)
- Miggs Cuaderno as Bidoy (season 1)
- Ian Ignacio as Malvar (season 1)
- Rabiya Mateo as Natasha "Asha" Raj (season 2)
- Gardo Versoza as Zeus Limjoco (season 2)
- Betong Sumaya as Arthuro "Art" de Mesa (season 2)
- Allan Paule as Simo (season 2)
- Kim de Leon as Jumong (season 2)
- Lia Salvador as Sharmaine (season 2)
- Shermaine Santiago as Carol Llamanzares (season 2)
- Rafael Rosell as Valerio Mariano (season 2)
- MJ Lastimosa as Rosebud / Garote (season 2)

Guest cast

- Sheryl Cruz as Myrna Labrador
- Yuan Francisco as Wacky Labrador

== Production ==
Principal photography commenced in February 2020. It was halted in March 2020 due to the enhanced community quarantine in Luzon caused by the COVID-19 pandemic. Filming was continued on December 5, 2020 in Tanay and Antipolo, Rizal.

== Ratings ==
According to AGB Nielsen Philippines' Nationwide Urban Television Audience Measurement People in television homes, the pilot episode of Agimat ng Agila earned a 16.3% rating. The season one finale scored a 14.7% rating. The series finale gathered an 11.5% rating.

== Accolades ==
Accolades received by Agimat ng Agila
Year	Award	Category	Recipient	Result	Ref.
2023	35th PMPC Star Awards for Television	Best Drama Mini Series	Agimat ng Agila	Won	
