= Miss Philippines Earth 2016 =

16th Miss Philippines Earth pageant

- Date: June 11, 2016
- Presenters: Robi Domingo; Catherine Untalan; Sandra Seifert; Stephany Stefanowitz
- Venue: UP Theater, Quezon City
- Broadcaster: ABS-CBN; Rappler; The Filipino Channel
- Entrants: 46
- Placements: 12
- Winner: Loren Mar Artajos; Laoag; (assumed); Imelda Schweighart; Puerto Princesa; (resigned)
- Congeniality: Hannah Vargas, Iloilo City
- Photogenic: Angelyn Presidente, Pototan

Miss Philippines Earth 2016 was the 16th Miss Philippines Earth pageant, held at the University of the Philippines Theater in Quezon City, on June 11, 2016.

Angelia Gabrena Ong of Manila crowned Imelda Schweighart of Puerto Princesa as her successor at the end of the event. Schweighart represented the Philippines at the Miss Earth 2016 pageant but failed to make it to the semifinals.

== Background ==
=== Location ===
The coronation night was supposed to be held at the Aguinaldo Shrine in Kawit, Cavite but due to severe weather conditions, this was later moved to the UP Theater in Quezon City.

=== Resignations ===
Due to the controversies prior to and after Miss Earth 2016, Imelda resigned from her duties as Miss Philippines Earth. Miss Philippines Earth-Water 2016 Loren Mar Artajos assumed the responsibilities Imelda has left. It was supposed to be handed over to Kiera Giel Gregorio but declined due to her law school commitments in London, therefore relinquishes her crown as well. Henceforth, those who are under Artajos move 2 steps higher and two semi-finalists are now part of the elemental court.

This is the first edition where the reigning Miss Philippines Earth and Miss Philippines Earth-Air resigned.

== Results ==
=== Placements ===
Placement	Contestant
Miss Philippines Earth 2016	Puerto Princesa – Imelda Schweighart
Miss Philippines Air 2016	London – Kiara Giel Gregorio
Miss Philippines Water 2016	Laoag – Loren Mar Artajos ∞
Miss Philippines Fire 2016	Rosales – Shannon Rebecca Bridgman
Miss Philippines Eco Tourism 2016	Vienna – Melanie Mader
Runners-Up	Cagayan de Oro – Charinna Barro; Caloocan – Joanna Rose Tolledo; Dumaguete – Maria Fatima Al-sowyed; Lobo – Krissandra Marie Abel; Murcia – Jessica Zevenbergen; San Pedro City – Athena Catriz; Zamboanga City – Bellatrix Tan

∞ – Schweighart resigned as Miss Philippines Earth 2016. Due to protocol, the Miss Philippines Water, Loren Mar Artajos, assumed the Miss Philippines Earth title.

=== Eventual Results ===
Due to several resignations the final titles are as follows:

Placement	Contestant
Miss Philippines Earth 2016	Laoag – Loren Mar Artajos
Miss Philippines Air 2016	Rosales – Shannon Bridgman
Miss Philippines Water 2016	Vienna – Melanie Mader
Miss Philippines Fire 2016	Dumaguete – Maria Fatima Al-sowyed
Miss Philippines Eco Tourism 2016	Cagayan de Oro – Charinna Barro
Runners-Up	Caloocan – Joanna Rose Tolledo; Lobo – Krissandra Marie Abel; Murcia – Jessica Zevenbergen; San Pedro City – Athena Catriz; Zamboanga City – Bellatrix Tan

=== Special awards ===
Award	Contestant	Terno Designer
Best Terno Designer	Sulu – Rhea Doll Gonzalo	Al-Shamir Abdul
Best Eco-Video	Quezon City – Jan Louise Abejero	
Eco-Warrior	Batangas – Krissandra Marie Abel	
Best Community Project	Muntinlupa – Aprilh Angelique Arciaga	
Miss SM Markets	Pangasinan – Eva Eunice Reinoso	
Miss HANA	London – Kiara Giel Gregorio	

== Challenge Events ==
=== Miss Friendship ===
The winners are:

Result	Contestant
1st place, gold medalist(s)	Iloilo City – Hannah Vargas
2nd place, silver medalist(s)	Muntinlupa – Aprilh Angelique Arciaga
3rd place, bronze medalist(s)	Jolo – Rhea Doll Gonzalo

=== Miss Photogenic (Miss Ever Bilena) ===
The winners are:

Result	Contestant
1st place, gold medalist(s)	Pototan – Angelyn Presidente
2nd place, silver medalist(s)	Cagayan de Oro – Charinna Barro
3rd place, bronze medalist(s)	Zamboanga City – Bellatrix Gabriel Tan

=== Talent Competition ===
The winners are:

Result	Contestant
1st place, gold medalist(s)	Alaminos – Eva Eunice Reinosos
2nd place, silver medalist(s)	Piat – Anna Mae Cagurangan
3rd place, bronze medalist(s)	Santa Barbara – Maybelle Pameroyan

=== Cultural Costume Competition ===
The winners are:

Result	Contestant
1st place, gold medalist(s)	Pagadian – Kristel Suizo
2nd place, silver medalist(s)	Palo – Niña Sherra Tagalog
3rd place, bronze medalist(s)	General Santos – Jezza Mae Lim

=== Swimsuit Competition ===
The winners are:

Result	Contestant
1st place, gold medalist(s)	London – Kiaragiel Gregorio
2nd place, silver medalist(s)	Puerto Princesa – Imelda Schweighart
3rd place, bronze medalist(s)	Vienna – Melanie Mader

=== Trash to Class Competition ===
The winners are:

Result	Contestant
1st place, gold medalist(s)	Vienna – Melanie Mader
2nd place, silver medalist(s)	Isabela City – Aicha Francisco
3rd place, bronze medalist(s)	Laoang – Ellyz Lee Santos

=== Cocktail Wear Competition ===
The winners are:

Result	Contestant
1st place, gold medalist(s)	Vigan – Kamille Alyssa Quinola
2nd place, silver medalist(s)	Alaminos – Eva Eunice Reinoso
3rd place, bronze medalist(s)	Puerto Princesa – Imelda Schweighart

=== Resort Wear Competition ===
The winners are:

Result	Contestant
1st place, gold medalist(s)	Lubang – Rachelle Quiñonez
2nd place, silver medalist(s)	Zamboanga City – Bellatrix Gabriel Tan
3rd place, bronze medalist(s)	Palo – Niña Sherra Tagalog

=== Evening Gown Competition ===
The winners are:

Result	Contestant
1st place, gold medalist(s)	Vienna – Melanie Mader
2nd place, silver medalist(s)	London – Kiaragiel Gregorio
3rd place, bronze medalist(s)	Puerto Princesa – Imelda Schweighart

=== Darling of the Press ===
The winners are:

Result	Contestant
1st place, gold medalist(s)	Anda – Liza Cacho
2nd place, silver medalist(s)	Puerto Princesa – Imelda Schweighart
3rd place, bronze medalist(s)	London – Kiaragiel Gregorio

== Contestants ==
The following is the list of the 46 official delegates of Miss Philippines Earth 2016 representing various cities, municipalities, provinces, and Filipino communities abroad.

No.	Locality	Contestant
1	Alaminos, Pangasinan	Eva Eunice Reinoso
2	Anda, Pangasinan	Liza Cacho
3	Infanta, Pangasinan	Chissan Rae Balderas
4	Laoag	Loren Mar Artajos
5	Piat, Cagayan	Anna Mae Cagurangan
6	Rosales, Pangasinan	Shannon Rebecca Bridgman
7	San Fernando, Pampanga	Korina Christiene Reyes
8	Santa Barbara, Pangasinan	Maybelle Pameroyan
9	Santa Rosa, Nueva Ecija	Carlette Marjean Agapito
10	Tuguegarao	Jovine Martin
11	Vigan	Kamille Alyssa Quiñola
12	Daet, Camarines Norte	Princess Cecilio
13	Lobo, Batangas	Krissandra Marie Abel
14	Looc, Romblon	Kattline Joy Eranes
15	Lubang, Occidental Mindoro	Rachelle Quiñonez
16	Naga	Andrea Delgado
17	Pililla, Rizal	Kisszel Malazarte
18	Puerto Princesa	Imelda Schweighart
19	San Jose, Occidental Mindoro	Karen Claudene Barot
20	San Pedro, Laguna	Athena Mari Jamaica Catriz
21	Santa Rosa, Laguna	Riji Anne Mae Canog
22	Caloocan	Joanna Rose Tolledo
23	Las Piñas	Jennifer Mangaring
24	Makati	Kimberly Gonzaga
25	Muntinlupa	Aprilh Angelique Arciaga
26	Parañaque	Justine Blaire Galang
27	Pasig	Jessica Jane Morales
28	Quezon City	Jan Louise Abejero
29	Bacolod	Vallerie Joy Jereza
30	Dumaguete	Maria Fatima Al-sowyed
31	Iloilo City	Hannah Vargas
32	Laoang, Northern Samar	Ellyz Santos
33	Murcia, Negros Occidental	Jessica Zevenbergen
34	Palo, Leyte	Niña Sherra Tagalog
35	Pototan, Iloilo	Angelyn Presidente
36	San Miguel, Bohol	Genina Abrau
37	Cagayan de Oro	Charinna Barro
38	Digos	Grapes Pacara
39	Isabela, Basilan	Aicha Francisco
40	Jasaan, Misamis Oriental	Maelyn Joy Unson
41	General Santos	Jezza Mae Lim
42	Jolo, Sulu	Rhea Doll Gonzalo
43	Pagadian	Kristel Suizo
44	Zamboanga City	Bellatrix Tan
45	Filipino Community of London, England	Kiaragiel Gregorio
46	Filipino Community of Vienna, Austria	Melanie Mader

== Judges ==
Judge	Background
Ramil Acosta	SM Markets Senior Vice President for Operations
John Cenica	Jancen Cosmetics Medical Director
Matthias Gelber	Greenest Person on the Planet 2008 (Chairman of the Board)
Priscilla Meirelles-Estrada	Miss Earth 2004
Jorge Reynoso	Manila Diamond Hotel Room Division Manager
Agnes Roscigno	President, Spouses of Heads of Mission
Lorraine Schuck	Carousel Productions Executive Vice President
Jasper Tiu	Peerless Manufacturing Senior Vice President
Pinky Webb	CNN Philippines News Anchor
