= Rabiya Mateo =

Filipino beauty queen, model, actress and host (born 1996)

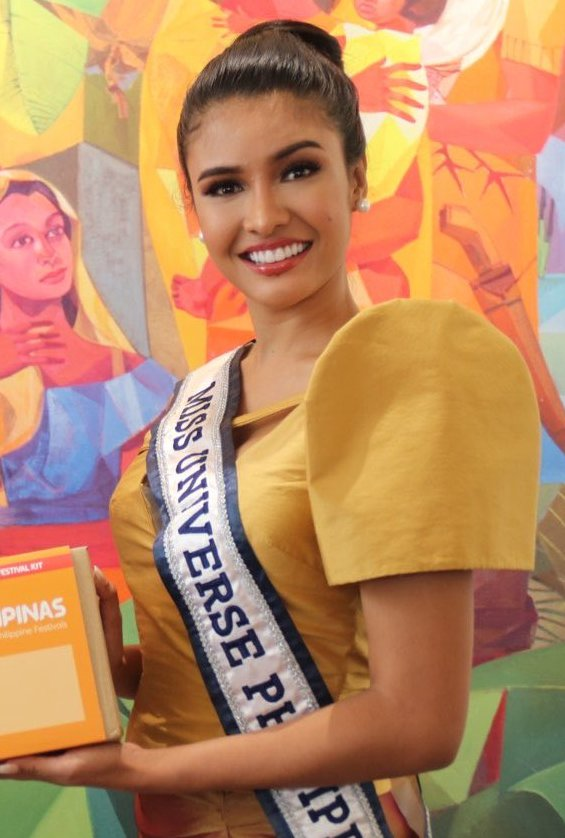
- Mateo in 2021
- Born: Rabiya Occeña Mateo; November 14, 1996 (age 29); Balasan, Iloilo, Philippines
- Other name: Ibyang
- Education: Iloilo Doctors' College (Physical Therapy)
- Height: 1.70 m (5 ft 7 in)
- Beauty pageant titleholder
- Title: Miss Universe Philippines 2020
- Years active: 2020–present
- Hair color: Black
- Eye color: Brown
- Major competitions: Miss Universe Philippines 2020; (Winner); Miss Universe 2020; (Top 21)

Rabiya Occeña Mateo (Hiligaynon: [ɾaˈbija ʔɔˈseɲa mɐˈteɔ]; born November 14, 1996) is a Filipino model, host, actress, comedian, entrepreneur and beauty pageant titleholder who was crowned Miss Universe Philippines 2020. She represented the Philippines at the Miss Universe 2020 pageant and finished as a top 21 semifinalist.

== Early life and education ==
Rabiya Occeña Mateo was born out of a domestic partnership between her Indian-American father and her Filipina mother who later on separated. According to Mateo, she grew up in poverty. She attended the Bachelor of Science in Physical Therapy Program at the Iloilo Doctors' College and graduated cum laude. As of 2020, Mateo works at a review center in Manila as a lecturer and review coordinator.

In March 2026, Mateo revealed that she scored 741 points out of a possible 800 in the NMAT, placing her among the top 1% of examinees in the Philippines. She was then later admitted to the Doctor of Medicine program of University of Santo Tomas Faculty of Medicine and Surgery.

== Career ==
=== Pageantry ===
==== Miss Universe Philippines 2020 ====
She represented Iloilo City at the Miss Universe Philippines 2020 pageant after she won Miss Iloilo Universe 2020 at West Visayas State University Cultural Center.

During the question and answer round of the Top 16 semifinalists, she was asked: "Throughout this journey you have discovered you are a phenomenal woman who is conditioned for greater. How can you create a positive and lasting impact to the world around you?" She responded:

"First of all, I need to stick to my core, which is being passionate about educating people. I am a lecturer and I've been pursuing this because this education had helped me to have that comfortable life that I and my family deserves and I wanna push people, I want them to achieve greater things in life through me and I know that Miss Universe anything is possible because I am a phenomenal woman with a heartfelt beauty."

During the first question and answer portion of the Top 5 finalists, she was asked: "If you can create a new paper currency with the image of any Filipino on it, dead or alive, who would it be and why?" She responded:

"If I were given the chance, I want to use the face of Miriam Defensor-Santiago. For those who don’t know, she was an Ilongga. But what I admired about her is that she used her knowledge, her voice to serve the country. I want to be somebody like her - somebody who puts her heart, her passion into action. After all, she is the best President that we never had."

During the second question and answer portion of the Top 5 finalists, she was asked: "This pandemic has made clear our priorities, essential or non-essential. Where do pageants stand in this time of crisis?" She responded:

"As a candidate, I know I am not just a face of Iloilo City but I am here carrying hope and as a symbol of light in the darkest of times. As of the moment, I want to help my community. I want to use my strength to make an impact. And that is the essence of beauty pageant. It gives us the power to make a difference."

At the end of the event, Mateo was crowned by the outgoing Miss Universe Philippines, Gazini Ganados, as Miss Universe Philippines 2020, along with the Best in Swimsuit award.

On September 30, 2021, Mateo crowned Beatrice Gomez as her successor at the Miss Universe Philippines 2021 pageant, which was held at the Henann Resort Convention Center, Alona Beach, in Panglao, Bohol, Philippines.

==== Miss Universe 2020 ====
Mateo represented the Philippines at the Miss Universe 2020 pageant in Miami, Florida, United States.

At the national costume competition, Mateo wore an ensemble made by the late avant-garde designer Rocky Gathercole. It featured blue and red wings and 3 gold stars that was inspired by the Philippine flag. The whole ensemble weighed more than 21 kilos. It was supposed to be complete with an extravagant headpiece by veteran jeweler Manny Halasan that symbolized the Philippine flag's sun, but she was not able to wear it because it was too big on her head and kept falling off. Moreover, the long train of her outfit proved too heavy for her to carry paired with her huge feathered wings, leading her team to make the last-minute decision to set the train aside since the chances of her falling if she went off balance in her seven-inch heels would be dangerous. It caused Mateo to spend her preparation time cutting the train and running for pins and scissors, and it did not leave her enough time to retouch her hair and her makeup, resulting in a performance many commentators reviewed as underwhelming. Just after the show, she filmed an Instagram live video to apologize to the people who were disappointed, during which she broke down crying.

At the preliminary competition, Mateo showed her 'hala-bira' walk. She donned a yellow two-piece bikini with an ankle-length coverup made of sheer fabric at the preliminary swimsuit competition. She wore an evening gown designed by Philippine-born, Dubai-based Furne One of Amato Couture at the preliminary evening gown competition. It is a yellow long gown paired with what appeared to be sun-inspired earrings which represents the sun, which symbolizes happiness, strength & vitality. The masterpiece featured a cape with citrine Swarovski crystals.

At the coronation night, Mateo walked in a yellow two-piece swimsuit by Eva Sevahl at the Top 21 swimsuit competition.

Mateo concluded her Miss Universe journey by finishing as a Top 21 semifinalist. Andrea Meza of Mexico won the said pageant.

=== Post Miss Universe; Acting and hosting duties ===
On September 30, 2021, Mateo crowned Beatrice Luigi Gomez of Cebu City as her successor at the end of the Miss Universe Philippines 2021 pageant. A few minutes before, Mateo unintentionally garnered the attention of the media because she tripped on the hem of her long thigh-slit gown and fell during her final walk. Many newspapers and commentators pointed out the fact that Mateo fell during her very last walk as Miss Universe Philippines 2020, while just three days afterwards Tracy Maureen Perez also fell when she was doing her very first walk as Miss World Philippines 2021.

Mateo made her acting debut in Ngisngis, an installment of Kapuso Mo, Jessica Soho's annual horror special Gabi ng Lagim. She later signed a contract with GMA Network on November 18, 2021, becoming one of the artists managed by GMA Artist Center (now Sparkle). Mateo portrayed supporting roles in several GMA dramas such as Agimat ng Agila (2022), Royal Blood (2023), and Makiling (2024), and also appeared in weekly anthologies Wish Ko Lang!, Magpakailanman, and Tadhana.

Her hosting career kickstarted in 2022, at the opening ceremony of NCAA Season 97. Mateo served as one of the pioneer hosts of daily variety game show TiktoClock along with Pokwang and Kim Atienza, until her departure in 2024 due to expiration of her contract with the show. Months later, she was as a mainstay in long-running gag show Bubble Gang, almost a year after her guest appearances.

== Personal life ==
As of 2026, she is dating Jake Cuenca, who confirmed their relationship.

== Filmography ==
=== Television ===
Year	Title	Role	Notes	Ref.
2020; 2021; 2022	Unang Hirit	Herself	Guest (2020 and 2021); Guest host (2022)	
2020	Eat Bulaga!	Herself	Guest / Bawal Judgmental judge	
2020	It's Showtime	Herself	Guest / Hide and Sing TAGOhula	
2020	Magandang Buhay	Herself	Guest	
2020	Kapuso Mo, Jessica Soho	Herself	Guest	
2020	ASAP Natin 'To	Herself	Guest	
2020	Paano Kita Mapasasalamatan?	Herself	Guest	
2021; 2022; 2023; 2024	All-Out Sundays	Herself	Guest	
2021	Brigada	Herself	Guest	
2021; 2023	The Boobay and Tekla Show	Herself	Guest	
2021	Kapuso Mo, Jessica Soho: Gabi ng Lagim IX - Ngisngis		Acting debut	
2021	Wish Ko Lang!: Magkaibigan	Rita	Episode role	
2022	Agimat ng Agila: Season 2	Agent Natasha "Asha" Raj	Supporting role	
2022	NCAA Season 97: Stronger Together, Buo ang Puso - Opening Ceremony	Herself	Hosting debut	
2022; 2023; 2024	24 Oras	Herself	Chika Minute substitute host for Iya Villania-Arellano	
2022; 2023; 2024	Family Feud	Herself	Contestant / Team Empire Philippines (2022); Team TiktoClock (2023); Team Sparkle 10; Team Bubble Gang (2024)	
2022	Dapat Alam Mo!	Herself	Guest	
2022	First Lady	Ashanti P. / applicant	Guest role	
2022	Sarap, 'Di Ba?	Herself	Guest	
2022–24	TiktoClock	Herself	Main host	
2022	NCAA Season 98: Achieve Greatness Every Day - Opening Ceremony	Herself	Host	
2022	Magpakailanman: Basta Ilongga, Guwapa	Herself	Episode role / Life story	
2023	Happy ToGetHer	Karen	Guest role	
2023	Regal Studio Presents: Perfect Fit	Jenna	Episode role	
2023	Royal Blood	Tasha	Supporting role	
2023; 2024	Fast Talk with Boy Abunda	Herself	Guest	
2023; 2024–25	Bubble Gang	Herself	Guest (2023); Mainstay / Various roles (2024–25)	
2023–24	Kapuso Countdown to 2024: The GMA New Year Special	Herself	Performer	
2024	Makiling	Maria Makiling	Supporting role	
2024	Magpakailanman: Abused and Raped	Mariel	Episode role	
2024	Wish Ko Lang!: Kamkam	Elena	Episode role	
2024	Pulang Araw	Rosalia	Guest role	
2024	Tadhana: Eskapo	Arya	Episode role	
2024	Magpakailanman: Asawa Noon, Kabit Ngayon	Racquel	Episode role	

=== Web ===
Year	Title	Role	Ref.
2022	One Good Day	Sandra	

Awards and achievements
Preceded by Gazini Ganados (Talisay, Cebu)	Miss Universe Philippines; 2020	Succeeded by Beatrice Gomez (Cebu City)
