= Miss Charm 2026 =

4th Miss Charm beauty pageant

- Date: 5 December 2026
- Theme: The Beauty of Cultural Identity
- Venue: Ho Chi Minh City, Vietnam
- Entrants: 45
- Debuts: Africa; Angola; Asia; Cameroon; Cuba; Guatemala; Haiti; Paraguay; Spain; Sri Lanka; Tanzania; United Kingdom
- Withdrawals: Bolivia; Bulgaria; Italy; Laos; Latvia; Moldova; Poland; Romania; Ukraine
- Returns: Belarus; Chile; Ecuador; Mongolia; New Zealand; Nigeria; Russia; Singapore

Miss Charm 2026 will be the fourth edition Miss Charm pageant, scheduled to be held in Vietnam on 5 December 2026.

Anna Blanco of Venezuela will crown her successor at the end of the event.

== Background ==
=== Location and date ===
The fourth edition of Miss Charm is scheduled to be held in Vietnam between November and December 2026. In June 2026, Miss Charm president Nguyễn Thị Thúy Nga confirmed to Tuổi Trẻ that the final competition would take place in early December. The final is scheduled to be held in Ho Chi Minh City on 5 December 2026, with "The Beauty of Cultural Identity" as its official theme.

=== Schedules ===
Miss Charm 2026: Schedule of Activities
Date	Event	Ref.
16–17 November	Arrival, registration, and fitting	
18–19 November	Photography and filming sessions	
20 November	Press conference and Diner party	
21 November	Trip to Da Lat	
22 November	"The Soul of Vietnam" at Lam Vien Square	
23 November	Tourism activities	
24 November	Visit the Minh Long Ceramic Museum	
25–27 November	Rehearsals, training, and Loa Loa Show	
28 November	Fashion show	
29 November	Tourism promotion and exploration activities	
30 November	Close-Door Interviews	
1 December	Rehearsals	
2 December	Preliminary competition	
3–4 December	Rehearsals	
5 December	Miss Charm 2026 Grand Final	

== Selection of participants ==
=== Debuts, returns and withdrawals ===
This edition will mark the debuts of the Continents of Africa and Asia, Angola, Cameroon, Cuba, Guatemala, Haiti, Paraguay, Spain, Sri Lanka, Tanzania, and the United Kingdom. It will also mark the returns of Chile and Singapore, which last participated in 2023; and Belarus, Ecuador, Mongolia, New Zealand, Nigeria, and Russia, which last competed in 2024.

Rocío Sánchez of the Continent of the Americas, Florencia Hernández of Argentina, Eri Miyasato of Bolivia, Maatla Poo of Botswana, Kristina Ivanova of Bulgaria, Roma Arif of Pakistan, Liliam Ashby Barrera of Panama, Valentina Baty Nsonde of the Republic of the Congo, Camilla Diagne of Senegal, and Cheryl Sambadzai of Zimbabwe, withdrew from the competition.

== Results ==
=== Best official portrait ===
Placement	Candidate
Top 6	Chile – Francisca Lavandero; India – Tejaswini Shrivastava; Indonesia – Gisela Thesa; Nigeria – Augustina Augustine; Philippines – Apriel Smith; Venezuela – Oky Espinoza

== Pageant ==
=== Format ===
The contestant with the highest number of votes will win the Miss People's Choice award and automatically advance to the top 6.

== Contestants ==
45 contestants competed for the title.

Country/Area	Contestant	Age (Note: Ages at the time of the pageant)	Hometown	Ref.
Africa	Chima Chisom	25	Enugu	
Angola	Neerlândia Rodrigues	23	Uíge	
Asia	Charlotte Yeung	25	Tsim Sha Tsui	
Australia	Krysta Heath	30	Maitland	
Belarus	Milana Yakimovich	21	Grodno	
Brazil	Letícia Galvão	27	Guarapari	
Cambodia	Sarleaphy Health	18	Phnom Penh	
Cameroon	Britney Ngafansi	24	Douala	
Chile	Francisca Lavandero	26	Los Ángeles	
China	Mingxi Gao	22	Liaoning	
Colombia	Valentina Olano	24	Barranquilla	
Costa Rica	Natasha Peng	24	Heredia	
Cuba	Yramsi Bárcena	23	Mayabeque	
Ecuador	Natalia Ormeño	22	Bahía de Caráquez	
Germany	Sarah Catherina Völmecke	22	Erftstadt	
Guatemala	Karina Ramírez	25	Chiquimula	
Haiti	Chidania Compère	24	Les Cayes	
India	Tejaswini Shrivastava	24	Nagpur	
Indonesia	Gisela Thesa	24	Bogor	
Japan	Lena Takeuchi	29	Tokyo	
Malaysia	Balroop Aujla	32	Kuala Lumpur	
Mexico	Cristina Meza	25	Eldorado	
Mongolia	Bayarchimeg Tsegmid	23	Ulaanbaatar	
Namibia	Hertha Iipinge	24	Okahao	
Netherlands	Shaivi Misier	18	Barendrecht	
New Zealand	Hollie Lintott	23	Christchurch	
Nigeria	Augustina Augustine	24	Ikot Ekpene	
Norway	Sophie Stensvik	18	Nesøya	
Paraguay	Fátima Rodríguez	34	Asunción	
Philippines	Apriel Smith	31	Cebu City	
Portugal	Milena Cassani	28	Albufeira	
Puerto Rico	Natalia Gómez	25	Coamo	
Russia	Renata Nadrshina	25	Ufa	
Singapore	Andrea Singh	25	Singapore	
South Africa	Anelisa Nxele	26	Inanda	
Spain	Dominique Reyes	22	Las Palmas	
Sri Lanka	Bianca del Buon	24	Colombo	
Tanzania	Sandra Giovinazzo	28	Arusha	
Thailand	Helena Sarakan	30	Udon Thani	
Turkey	Elifnur Çifci	25	Adana	
United Kingdom	Charlie Cousin	19	Deal	
United States	Fallon Williams	27	Houston	
Venezuela	Oky Espinoza	23	Caucagua	
Vietnam	Trà My Nguyễn	30	Ho Chi Minh City	
Zambia	Shenise Kanema	20	Lusaka	
