= Nicole Borromeo =

Filipino model and beauty pageant titleholder

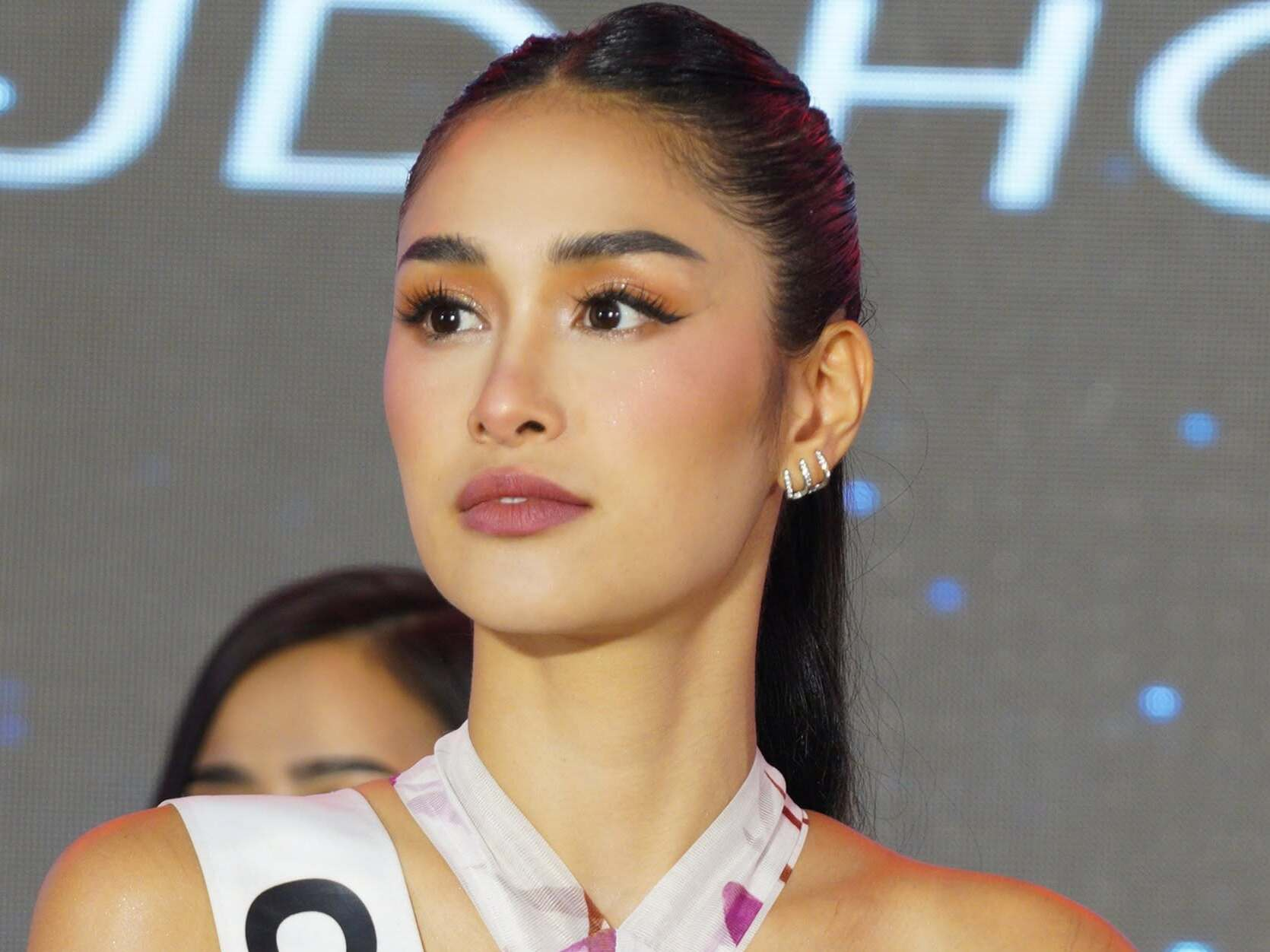
- Borromeo in 2026
- Born: Nicole Yance Borromeo; December 9, 2000 (age 25); Cebu City, Philippines
- Education: SoFA Design Institute
- Beauty pageant titleholder
- Title: Binibining Pilipinas International 2022; The Miss Philippines Worldwide 2026
- Major competitions: Binibining Pilipinas 2022; (Winner – Binibining Pilipinas International 2022); (Miss Careline); Miss International 2023; (3rd Runner-Up); Miss Universe Philippines 2026; (Top 7); Miss Worldwide 2026; (TBD)

Nicole Yance Borromeo (Tagalog: [nɪˈkoʊl boɾoˈmeo]; born December 9, 2000) is a Filipino model and beauty pageant titleholder who won Binibining Pilipinas International 2022. She represented the Philippines at Miss International 2023, and was the third runner-up. She represented Cebu at Miss Universe Philippines 2026 and reached the top seven.

== Early life and career ==
Nicole Yance Borromeo was born on December 9, 2000, in Cebu, Philippines. She is a native of Guadalupe, Cebu City. Borromeo completed secondary education from Cebu Doctors' University in Mandaue. She attended the University of San Carlos for a degree in interior design.

In October 2024, she appeared in Paris Fashion Week, walking for Joseph Auren, Michael Cinco, and Leo Almodal.

== Pageantry ==
=== 2017–2019: Local and teen pageantry ===
On October 14, 2017, Borromeo won Miss Silka Cebu 2017. Her victory advanced her to the Miss Silka Philippines 2017 pageant, where she finished as the second runner-up. The following year, she competed at Miss Mandaue 2018, where she placed as the first runner-up to Gabbi Carballo.

During Sinulog in 2019, Borromeo was the festival queen of the Carcar contingent. On January 18, she was crowned as the Sinulog Festival Queen of that year, becoming the second winner from Carcar. As festival queen, she competed at the Reyna ng Aliwan 2019 pageant, where she won, marking her first national title. However, she would be stripped of the title following her subsequent participation in other pageants.

Borromeo represented Carcar at Miss Teen Philippines 2019, where she was the second runner-up to Nikki de Moura of Cagayan de Oro. In August, she joined Miss Millennial Philippines 2019, a tourism beauty pageant segment of the Philippine reality show, Eat Bulaga!. After months of competition, she would be crowned as the winner on October 26, marking the second consecutive title for a candidate from Cebu.

=== Binibining Pilipinas 2022 ===
Borromeo represented Cebu at Binibining Pilipinas 2022. For the national costume competition, she collaborated with Axel Que for a design inspired by the Sinulog.

During the coronation night, she received one sponsor award. Borromeo progressed to the top 12, and during the question-and-answer portion, she was asked to rate herself as a "responsible Filipino citizen" on a scale of one to ten. She rated herself an eight, recognizing her opportunities to improve and willingness to learn.

At the end of the event, Borromeo was named Binibining Pilipinas International 2022, succeeding Hannah Arnold of Masbate. Her announcement as the winner was subject to a delay, which prompted a dispute online over the validity of the results. In response, judge Lara Quigaman and host Catriona Gray assured that the results were free from error.

=== Miss International 2023 ===
Borromeo represented the Philippines at the Miss International 2023 competition on October 26, 2023. She collaborated with Que again for the national costume competition, where she presented "Swaki", a sea urchin-inspired design with design cues from Yayoi Kusama.

During the finals, Borromeo wore a Furne Amato gown inspired by Visayan sirens titled "Majestic Magindara". She progressed to the semifinals, and later the top seven question-and-answer portion. In this segment, she was asked about her contributions in achieving the sustainable development goals. In her response, she highlighted her work with Habitat for Humanity and cited child welfare as her motivation for her participation in the initiative.

Borromeo was the third runner-up to Andrea Rubio of Venezuela.

=== Miss Universe Philippines 2026 ===
On February 1, 2026, the Miss Universe Philippines Cebu organization appointed Borromeo and Apriel Smith as their delegates for Cebu and Cebu City, respectively, at Miss Universe Philippines 2026. During the preliminary competition, she wore a silver Leo Almodal gown. For the national costume competition, she wore a design by Art Don titled "Reyna sa Karagatan" (lit. 'Queen in the Seas') inspired by her province's place within the Coral Triangle.

At the end of the competition, Borromeo had reached the top seven. Following the coronation night held on May 2, 2026, Borromeo was appointed as the inaugural The Miss Philippines Worldwide by The Miss Philippines organization in a separate ceremony held on May 10, 2026, at the City of Dreams Manila.

=== Miss Worldwide 2026 ===
Borromeo will represent the Philippines at Miss Worldwide 2026.

== Personal life ==
Borromeo has been in a relationship with Giles Benedicto, a corporate executive at the BE Group.

Awards and achievements
Preceded by (Colombia) Natalia López	Miss International; 3rd Runner-Up; 2023	Succeeded by (Venezuela) Sakra Guerrero
Preceded by Hannah Arnold (Masbate)	Binibining Pilipinas; International; 2022	Succeeded by Angelica Lopez (Palawan)
