= Miss Universe Philippines 2020 =

1st Miss Universe Philippines pageant

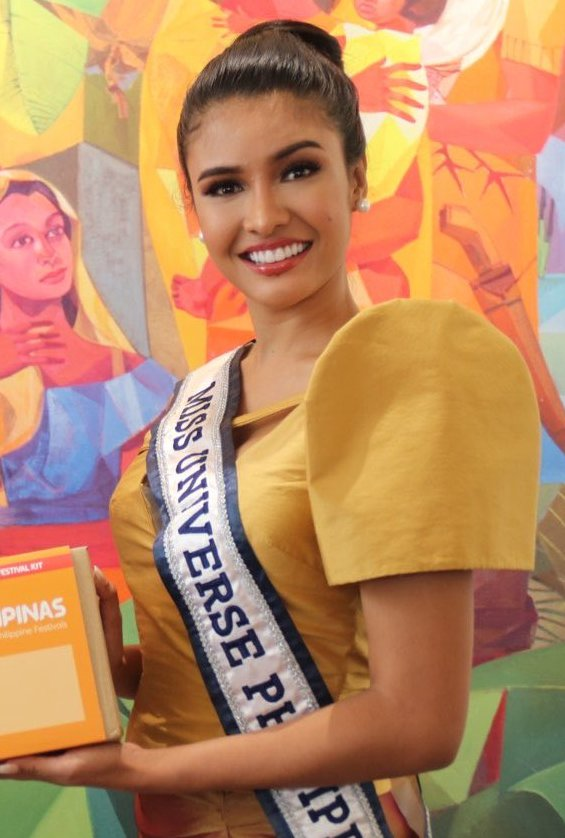
- Rabiya Mateo
- Date: October 25, 2020
- Presenters: KC Montero
- Entertainment: Jessica Sanchez; Allen Cecilio; Anjo Damiles; Kevin Montillano
- Theme: The Filipino is Phenomenal
- Venue: Cordillera Convention Hall, Baguio Country Club, Baguio, Benguet
- Broadcaster: GMA Network
- Entrants: 46
- Placements: 16
- Withdrawals: Aurora; Capiz; Cagayan de Oro; Leyte; Negros Occidental; Sorsogon
- Winner: Rabiya Mateo; Iloilo City
- Best National Costume: Lou Dominique Piczon, Mandaue
- Photogenic: Tracy Perez, Cebu City

External videos
- Finals Night (Official)

Miss Universe Philippines 2020 was the first edition of the Miss Universe Philippines pageant under its new organization. Previously, the Philippine franchise for Miss Universe was under Binibining Pilipinas Charities, Inc. The coronation night was initially scheduled for May 3, 2020. However, due to the COVID-19 pandemic, it moved at least twice; first to June 14, 2020, and later to October 25, 2020, at the Cordillera Convention Hall, Baguio Country Club in Baguio, Benguet.

Rabiya Mateo of Iloilo City won the competition, succeeding Miss Universe Philippines 2019, Gazini Ganados of Talisay, Cebu The competition also featured the debut of the new Filipina crown, crafted by the Villarica family, who is known for running the Villarica Pawnshop.

Mateo eventually represented the Philippines at the Miss Universe 2020 pageant and finished as a Top 21 semi-finalist.

Contestants from forty-six localities competed in this edition. The pageant was hosted by KC Montero. American Idol alumnus Jessica Sanchez and Filipino actors Allen Cecilio, Anjo Damiles, and Kevin Montillano performed as musical guests.

== Background ==
=== Selection of participants ===
In December 2019, the organization launched its search for the next Filipina who would represent the Philippines at the Miss Universe 2020 competition. The deadline of the submission of applications was on January 18, 2020, and the screenings were set to take place from January 20 to 24.

However, on January 25, the new owners of the franchise introduced an Accredited Partner Program, where provinces and cities could send one contestant from each locality through an accredited partner. Walk-in contestants are still accepted by the organization until 31 January 2020, after which the contestants went through a final screening on February 1. The walk-in contestants who passed the final screening were then adopted by an accredited partner and joined all other contestants that were determined by an accredited partner on February 10. On February 14, the fifty-two contestants of Miss Universe Philippines 2020 were presented during the Red Carpet Presentation at Manila Hotel.

==== Withdrawals ====
Six contestants withdrew from the pageant due to the COVID-19 pandemic. Vincy Vacalares of Cagayan de Oro and Maria Isabela Galeria of Sorsogon were forced to withdrawn from the competition after they tested positive for COVID-19. Princess Marquez of Aurora and Chaira Lyn Markwalder of Leyte withdrew for personal reasons. Angela Aninang of Negros Occidental withdrew to focus on her studies, while Mariam Lara Hamid of Capiz withdrew due to breach of contract by your local accredited partner.

=== Location and date ===
On January 29, the organization announced that the coronation was scheduled for May 3 evening at the Mall of Asia Arena in Pasay. However, due to the COVID-19 pandemic, it was rescheduled twice; the first time to June 14, 2020, and later to October 25, 2020, at the Cordillera Convention Hall, inside the Baguio Country Club. This edition was held entirely in a closed location and without the presence of the public, which prevented the candidates from carrying out any external activities and in the same way as the preliminaries. Also, many segments from the final competition were tapped before the broadcast. For the first time on history, a major pageant on Philippines held exclusively behind closed doors.

=== Impact of the COVID-19 pandemic ===
An eight-episode web series entitled Ring Light was released on September 27 on Empire.ph and could be viewed for a one-time fee. Marketed as a "fundraising online pageant series", part of the proceeds would be given to the pageants' beneficiaries and partner organizations. The series featured several aspects of the pageant's contestants bid to clinch the Miss Universe Philippines 2020 crown, including their trainings and other behind-the-scenes content.

== Results ==
=== Placements ===
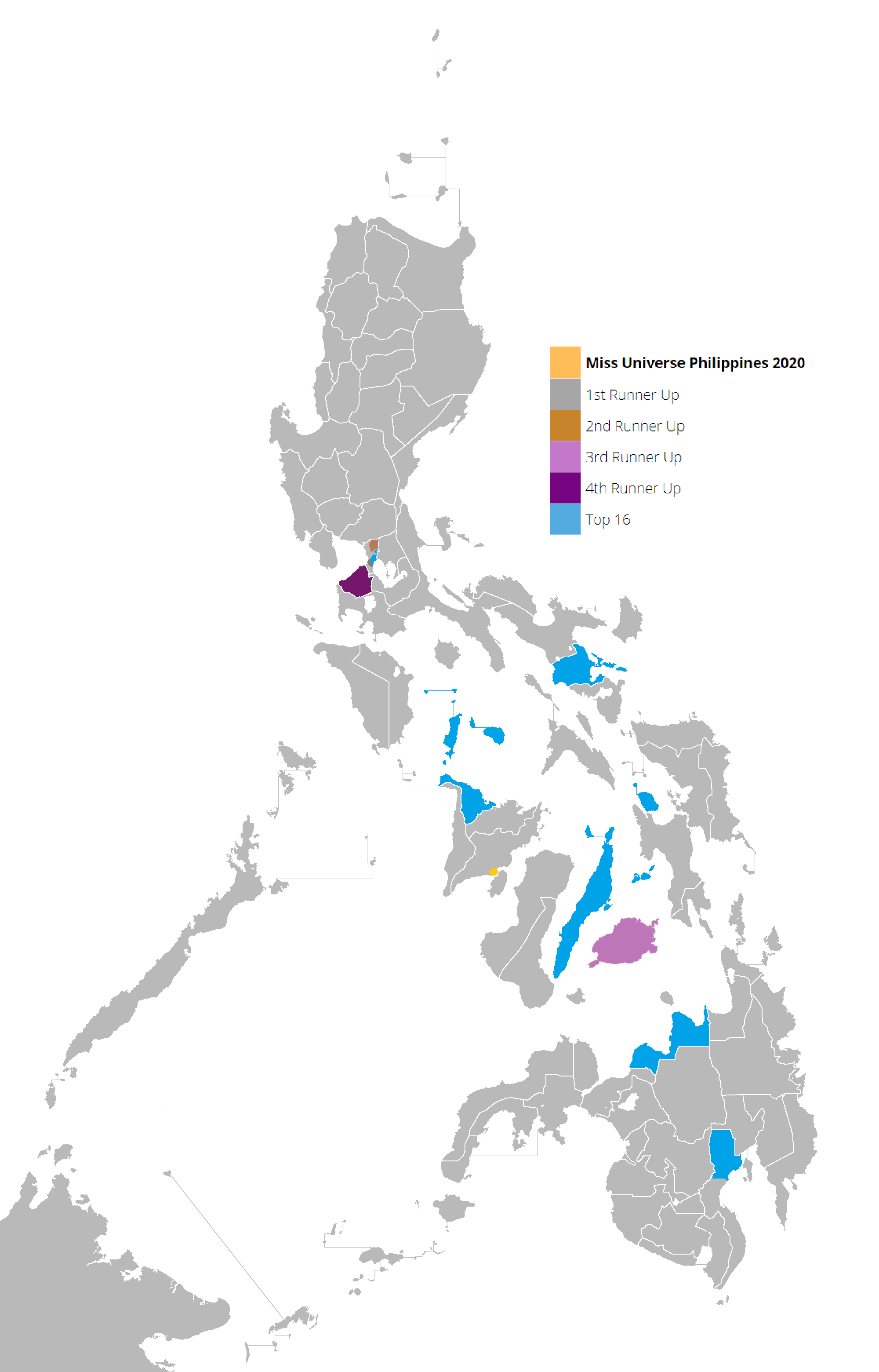
The Philippine map results of Miss Universe Philippines 2020, colors shaded in each province/cities.

Placement	Contestant
Miss Universe Philippines 2020	Iloilo City – Rabiya Mateo
1st Runner-Up	Parañaque – Bella Ysmael
2nd Runner-Up	Quezon City – Michele Gumabao
3rd Runner-Up	Bohol – Pauline Amelinckx
4th Runner-Up	Cavite – Kimberly Hakenson
Top 16	Aklan – Christelle Abello; Albay – Paula Ortega; Biliran – Skelly Ivy Florida §; Cebu – Apriel Smith; Cebu City – Tracy Perez; Davao City – Alaiza Flor Malinao; Mandaue – Lou Dominique Piczon; Misamis Oriental – Caroline Joy Veronilla; Pasig – Riana Agatha Pangindian; Romblon – Maria Fee Tajaran; Taguig – Sandra Lemonon

§ – Lazada Fan Vote winner

=== Appointments ===
Title	Ambassadress
Ambassadress for Education	Iloilo City – Rabiya Mateo
Ambassadress for Arts and Culture	Parañaque – Bella Ysmael
Ambassadress for Health and Fitness	Quezon City – Michele Gumabao
Ambassadress for Tourism	Bohol – Pauline Amelinckx
Ambassadress for Gender Equality	Cavite – Kimberly Hakenson

=== Special awards ===
Award	Contestant
Best in Evening Gown	Parañaque – Bella Ysmael
Best in National Costume	Mandaue – Lou Dominique Piczon
Best in Runway	Mandaue – Lou Dominique Piczon
Best in Swimsuit	Iloilo City – Rabiya Mateo
Best in Swimsuit Photo	Cebu City – Tracy Perez
Miss Photogenic	Cebu City – Tracy Perez
Best Tourism Video	Batanes – Jan Alexis Elcano
Downy Sweetheart Award	Bohol – Pauline Amelinckx
Face of the Universe	Bohol – Pauline Amelinckx
Miss Cetaphil Sun	Bohol – Pauline Amelinckx
Miss Creamsilk	Bohol – Pauline Amelinckx
Miss Lazada Fan Vote	Biliran – Skelly Ivy Florida
Miss MG Philippines	Quezon City – Michele Gumabao

== Pageant ==
=== Format ===
The results of the preliminary competition, which consisted of the swimsuit competition, the evening gown competition, and the closed-door interview, determined the first fifteen semi-finalists selected at large. Internet voting was also used, with fans being able to vote for another delegate to advance into the semi-finals through the Lazada Fan Vote.

The sixteen semi-finalists competed in three rounds: question-and-answer, swimsuit and evening gown. The swimwear for the finals was designed by UAE-based couture label Amato Couture by Filipino designer Furne One in collaboration with luxury swimwear Amari Swim. From sixteen, five finalists were chosen to compete at the final question-and-answer round. Two questions were asked; the first being unique to each candidate and the second is the same question answered by all five finalists. Afterwards, Miss Universe Philippines 2020 and her runners-up were announced.

=== Selection committee ===
==== Preliminary competition ====
- Mary Jean Lastimosa – Miss Universe Philippines 2014
- Katrina Salonga Verzosa – Owner and founder of the Verzosa Aesthetic Clinic.
- Maria Venus Raj – Miss Universe Philippines 2010
- Ariella Arida – Miss Universe Philippines 2013
- Jackie Aquino – General manager of JCA Productions and the president of Philippine Fashion Coalition
- Samuel Salonga Verzosa Jr. – Co-founder and CEO of Frontrow
- Neil Perez – Mister International 2014

==== Final competition ====
- RS Francisco – Actor and co-founder of Frontrow
- Eric Yap – Representative of ACT-CIS Partylist and Legislative Caretaker of the Lone District of Benguet
- Harry Roque – Lawyer and Presidential Spokesperson
- Jackie Aquino – General manager of JCA Productions and the president of Philippine Fashion Coalition
- Venus Navalta – CEO of IPG Mediabrands Philippines
- Janine Tugonon – Miss Universe Philippines 2012
- Arlene Magalong – Wife of the mayor of Baguio
- Arthur Peña – Group Director for Media of Procter & Gamble Philippines
- Samuel Salonga Verzosa Jr. – Co-founder and CEO of Frontrow

== Contestants ==
Forty-six contestants competed for the title.

Province/City	Contestant	Age (Note: Ages at the time of the pageant)
Aklan	Christelle Abello	26
Albay	Paula Ortega	24
Angeles	Christine Silvernale	19
Antique	Joecel Robenta	23
Batanes	Jan Alexis Elcano	21
Baguio	Bea Maynigo	24
Batangas	Nathalia Urcia	26
Biliran	Skelly Ivy Florida	21
Bohol	Pauline Amelinckx	25
Bulacan	Daniella Louise Loya	20
Cagayan	Danica Reynes	27
Camarines Sur	Krizzia Moreno	25
Catanduanes	Sigrid Flores	27
Cavite	Kimberly Hakenson	26
Cebu	Apriel Smith	24
Cebu City	Tracy Perez	27
Davao City	Alaiza Malinao	27
Davao del Norte	We'am Ahmed	20
General Santos	Mariel Pascua	23
Ilocos Sur	Adelma Benicta	26
Iloilo	Kim Chi Crizaldo	23
Iloilo City	Rabiya Mateo	23
Isabela	Maria Regina Malana	25
Kalinga	Noreen Victoria Mangawit	22
La Union	Trizha Ocampo	25
Laguna	Jo-Ann Flores	26
Makati	Ivanna Kamil Pacis	24
Mandaue	Lou Dominique Piczon	24
Manila	Alexandra Abdon	25
Marinduque	Lianina Macalino	27
Misamis Oriental	Caroline Veronilla	25
Muntinlupa	Maricres Castro	25
Oriental Mindoro	Adee Hitomi Akiyama	27
Palawan	Jennifer Linda	18
Pampanga	Patricia Santos	26
Pangasinan	Niña Soriano	24
Parañaque	Bella Ysmael	24
Pasay	Zandra Nicole Santa Maria	27
Pasig	Riana Pangindian	24
Quezon	Faye Deveza	23
Quezon City	Michele Gumabao	28
Rizal	Ericka Evangelista	25
Romblon	Marie Fee Tajaran	25
Surigao del Norte	Carissa Quiza	19
Taguig	Sandra Lemonon	26
Zamboanga del Sur	Perlyn Cayona	22
