= Furne One =

Filipino fashion designer

- Born: Fernando Barrios; Cebu City, Philippines
- Other name: Furne One Amato
- Occupations: Fashion designer, Creative director
- Years active: 1994–present
- Known for: Founder and creative director of Amato Couture
- Awards: Mega Magazine Young Designer of the Year (1994); International Fashion Designer of the Year (EMI Gala, 2021)
- Website: Official Amato Couture website

Fernando Barrios, professionally known as Furne One, (Note: 'One' is pronounced as oʊ.neɪ) is a Filipino fashion designer based in Dubai and the creative director and founder of the haute couture house Amato Couture.

== Early life and education ==
Furne One was born Fernando Barrios in Cebu City, Philippines. His father was a pilot and his mother was a housewife. He began sketching clothing designs at age ten, inspired from his mother and grandmother's love of fashion. He often visits his mother's tailor shop.

One studied in a boys' school and was teased for being "different" though he attest not being affected and growing up with his own group of friends. He also committed to pursuing a career in fashion design going against the wishes of his parents; with his father encouraging him to become an engineer and his mother convincing him to be the accountant. Accountancy and engineering at the time was considered as lucrative according to One.

One pursued a degree in fine arts with a major in advertising at the University of San Carlos in Cebu City, since there is no fashion design program at the time.

== Career ==
=== Early years ===
While studying college, One worked part-time as a visual merchandiser for Smart Shoes. He gained the attention of Gaw, a major department store who asked him to design a ready-to-wear capsule collection. At 20-years old, One dropped out of college to focus on being a full-time fashion designer.

One had his break when he won the MEGA Magazine Young Designer of the Philippines competition in 1994, judged by Filipino‑American designer Josie Natori, who offered him an apprenticeship in New York. Prior to going to New York, One also trained in Paris. He also won the Japan's Women’s Wear Awards in the same year, and a finalist at Manila's Fashion Designer Awards in 1997.

=== Amato Couture ===
Upon the suggestion of a friend, One moved to Dubai in the United Arab Emirates in 1998 where he initially worked at a tailor shop in Deira.

In 2002, One founded Amato Couture in Dubai with textile expert Rashid Ali and named it Amato (Italian for "beloved"). The Amato line specialized on gowns. The outlet initially started designing party and wedding dresses before gaining reputation in the wider Gulf region.

In 2017, One opened his first ready-to-wear store called Amato Luxe at the Dubai Design District.

One was recognized as the International Fashion Designer of the Year and a Fashion Innovator at the EMI Gala Fashion Awards held in 2021 in Dubai.

One is the creative director for the inaugural Miss Universe United Arab Emirates pageant in December 2021 with Amato Couture responsible for the outfits of the beauty pageant's top thirty qualifying contestants.

In February 2025, One opened the Amato Cebu in Cebu City, a fashion cafe. In May 2025, One featured his “Take Me to the Sea” 63-piece collection which featured haute couture designs for a beach setting at the Weddings by Crimson fashion show.

== Notable clients ==
One’s designs have been worn by various musicians and entertainers, including Beyoncé, Lady Gaga, Katy Perry, Jennifer Lopez, Nicki Minaj, and Shakira. Among his Philippine-based clients are Maymay Entrata, Nadine Lustre, Maja Salvador, and Vice Ganda
