= Miss Charm 2025 =

Third Miss Charm beauty pageant

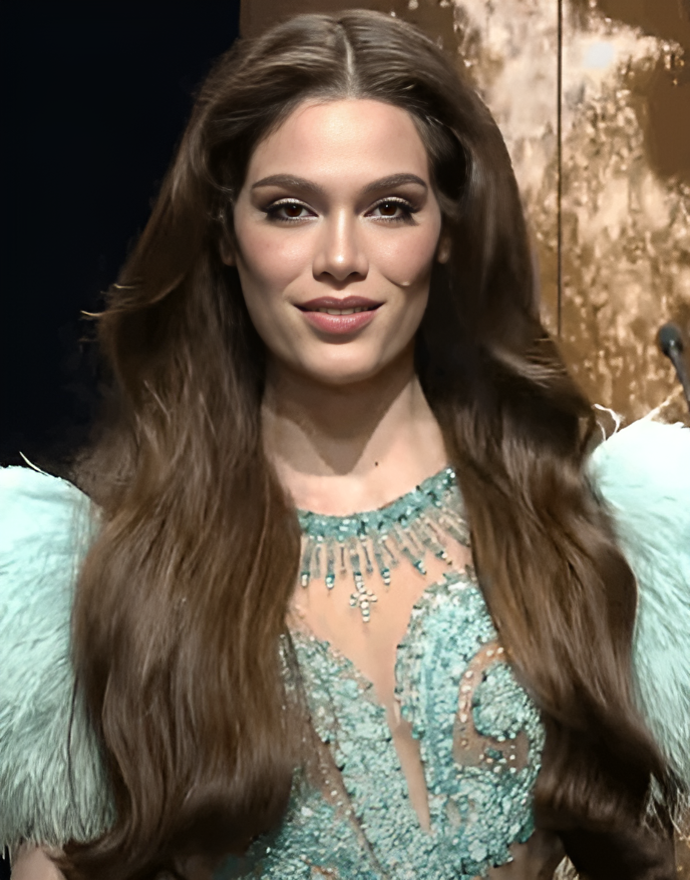
- Anna Blanco
- Date: 12 December 2025
- Presenters: Alana Moore; Dustin Phúc Nguyễn; Trịnh Thị Hồng Đăng
- Entertainment: Huỳnh Nguyễn Mai Phương; Phương Vy
- Venue: BHD Studio, Ho Chi Minh City, Vietnam
- Broadcaster: YouTube
- Entrants: 34
- Placements: 20
- Debuts: Bulgaria; Italy; Laos; Latvia; Moldova; Norway; Turkey
- Withdrawals: Albania; Belarus; Canada; Ecuador; El Salvador; England; France; Mongolia; Montenegro; New Zealand; Nigeria; Russia; South Korea
- Returns: Cambodia; Costa Rica; Portugal; Ukraine
- Winner: Anna Blanco; Venezuela
- Best National Costume: Cyrille Payumo (Philippines)

External videos
- Final show
- Preliminary competition

Miss Charm 2025 was the third Miss Charm pageant, held at BHD Studio in Ho Chi Minh City, Vietnam, on 12 December 2025.

At the end of the event, Rashmita Rasindran of Malaysia, crowned Anna Blanco of Venezuela as her successor.

Contestants from thirty-four countries and territories participated in the pageant.

== Background ==
=== Selection of participants ===
Nguyễn Thị Thúy Nga, president of the Miss Charm pageant, confirmed that the age eligibility for contestants had been revised for this contest, allowing candidates aged 18 to 35 to compete.

==== Debuts, returns, and withdrawals ====
This contest marked the debuts of Bulgaria, Italy, Laos, Latvia, Moldova, Norway, and Turkey, and the returns of Cambodia, Costa Rica, Portugal, and Ukraine, which last competed in 2023. Belarus, Canada, Ecuador, El Salvador, England, Mongolia, New Zealand, Russia, and South Korea withdrew from the competition.

Amenda Bardhollari of Albania did not arrive in the host country. Manuella Gritar of France did not attend the preliminary round. Llaura Maroviq of Montenegro and Emmanuella Eyare Asu of Nigeria did not arrive in the host country for personal reasons.

==== Did not compete ====
Troy-Ann Anderson of Jamaica, Dania Khan of Pakistan, and Samantha Chikwanda of Zimbabwe did not arrive in the host country for personal reasons. Andrea Pokorná of the Czech Republic and Ivana Stotková of Slovakia participated in the competition but did not attend the preliminary round for undisclosed reasons.

== Results ==
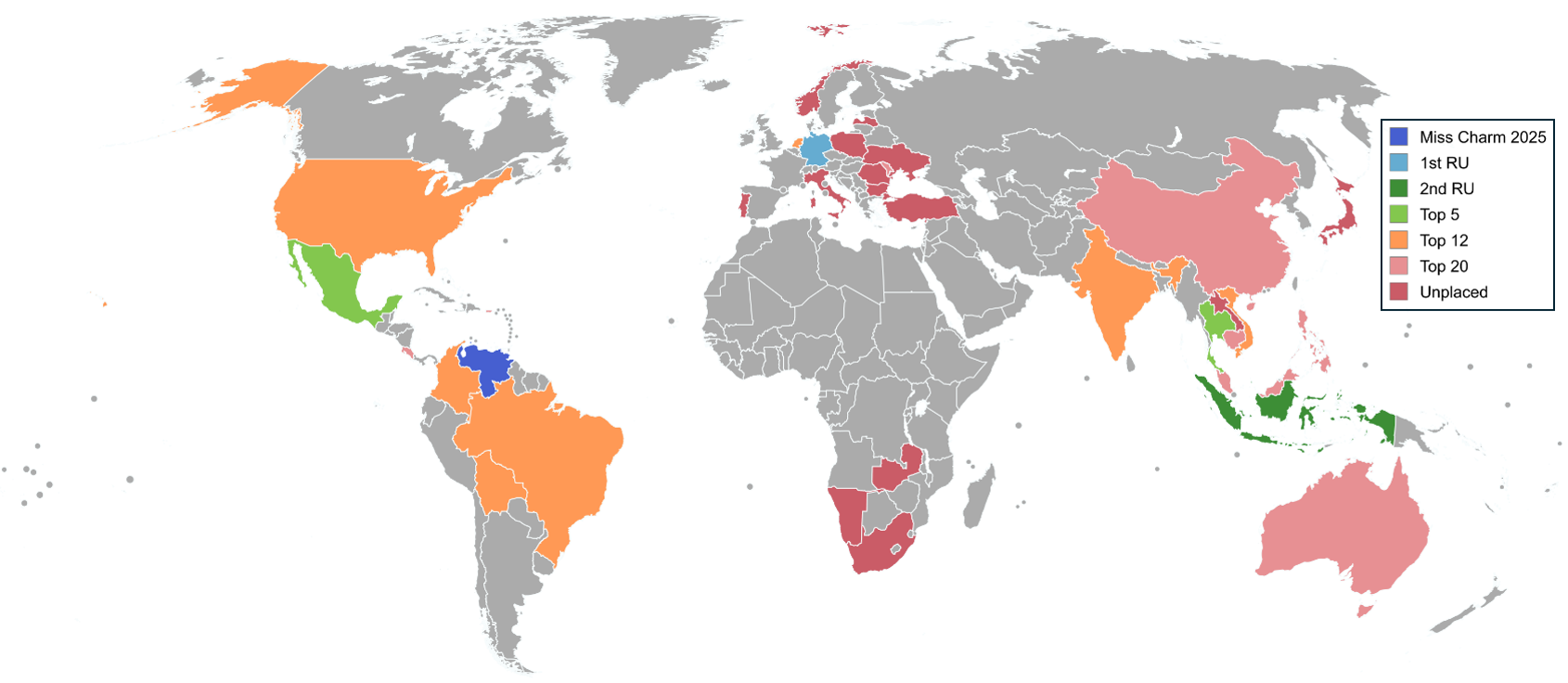
Miss Charm 2025 participating nations and results

=== Placements ===
Placement	Contestant
Miss Charm 2025	Venezuela – Anna Blanco
1st Runner-Up	Germany – Luisa Malz
2nd Runner-Up	Indonesia – Rinanda Maharani
Top 5	Mexico – Francia Cortés; Thailand – Naruemol Phimphakdee
Top 12	Bolivia – Estefanía Ibarra; Brazil – Maiara Porto; Colombia – María José Chacón; India – Mehakk Dhingraa; Netherlands – Jaelin Ramadhin; United States – Kaylyn Slevin §; Vietnam – Mai Ngô
Top 20	Australia – Nasia Delis; Cambodia – Sreyneat Det; China – Jiaqi Li; Costa Rica – Tamara Castro; Malaysia – Jessrina Kaur; Moldova – Gutiera Timotin; Philippines – Cyrille Payumo; Puerto Rico – Nicole Hernández

§ – Voted into the Top 12 by viewers and awarded as People's Choice

==== Special awards ====
Award	Contestant
Best Face	Poland – Julia Łuczak
Best in Evening Gown	Germany – Luisa Malz
Best in Social Media	Cambodia – Sreyneat Det
Best in Swimsuit	India – Mehakk Dhingrra
Best National Costume	Philippines – Cyrille Payumo
Miss A.I. Glow	Thailand – Naruemol Phimphakdee
Miss Inspiration	Italy – Lizzy Giannitelli
Miss Tourism	Vietnam – Mai Ngô
People's Choice	United States – Kaylyn Slevin

== Pageant ==
The Miss Charm 2025 final competition was held on 12 December 2025 in Vietnam.

=== Selection committee ===
- Chu Thị Hồng Anh — Chairwoman of Chu Thi Group
- Kevin Lilliana — Miss International 2017 from Indonesia
- Luma Russo — Miss Charm 2023 from Brazil
- Nguyễn Thị Thúy Nga — President of Miss Charm organization
- Rashmita Rasindran — Miss Charm 2024 from Malaysia
- Suzuko Knapper — Entertainment consultant and wife of the United States Ambassador to Vietnam

==== Preliminary competition ====
Trịnh Thị Hồng Đăng, second runner-up of Miss Universe Vietnam 2023, and Alana Moore, first runner-up of Miss Charm 2024, served as presenters. The judging panel was composed of the following members:

- Chu Thị Hồng Anh — Chairwoman of Chu Thi Group
- Nguyễn Thị Thúy Nga — President of Miss Charm organization
- Rashmita Rasindran — Miss Charm 2024 from Malaysia

== Contestants ==
Thirty-four contestants competed for the title.

Country/Territory	Contestant	Age (Note: Ages at the time of the pageant)	Hometown	Ref.
Australia	Nasia Delis	26	Melbourne	
Bolivia	Estefanía Ibarra	30	La Paz	
Brazil	Maiara Porto	24	Nova Friburgo	
Bulgaria	Tatiana Savko	24	Sofia	
Cambodia	Sreyneat Det	24	Phnom Penh	
China	Jiaqi Li	21	Shandong	
Colombia	María José Chacón	24	Tolima	
Costa Rica	Tamara Castro	19	San José	
Germany	Luisa Malz	22	Dortmund	
India	Mehakk Dhingrra	18	New Delhi	
Indonesia	Rinanda Maharani	22	East Kutai	
Italy	Lizzy Giannitelli	27	Rome	
Japan	Eri Fujita	29	Tokyo	
Laos	Soudavone Inthavong	30	Luang Namtha	
Latvia	Zinaida Tesliuk	27	Riga	
Malaysia	Jessrina Kaur	28	Kuala Lumpur	
Mexico	Francia Cortés	25	Tepic	
Moldova	Gutiera Timotin	26	Chișinău	
Namibia	Alica Mokhatu	23	Okahandja	
Netherlands	Jaelin Ramadhin	22	Rotterdam	
Norway	Julie Tollefsen	31	Oslo	
Philippines	Cyrille Payumo	26	Porac	
Poland	Julia Łuczak	21	Poznań	
Portugal	Juliana Lopes	24	Lisbon	
Puerto Rico	Nicole Hernández	23	Toa Baja	
Romania	Ana Maria Mozăceanu	23	Sulina	
South Africa	Londekile Nonyane	23	Mpumalanga	
Thailand	Naruemol Phimphakdee	23	Buriram	
Turkey	Alara Erıç	21	Istanbul	
Ukraine	Kateryna Bilyk	28	Bohuslav	
United States	Kaylyn Slevin	24	Chicago	
Venezuela	Anna Blanco	25	Caracas	
Vietnam	Mai Ngô	30	Ho Chi Minh City	
Zambia	Kutemba Njapau	20	Zambezi	
