= Miss Charm South Africa =

Beauty pageants in South Africa

- Formation: 2025; 1 year ago
- Purpose: Beauty pageant
- Location: South Africa
- Official language: English
- Current titleholder: Anelisa Nxele
- Affiliations: Miss Charm

Miss Charm South Africa is a national beauty pageant that selects a representative of South Africa for Miss Charm.

== History ==
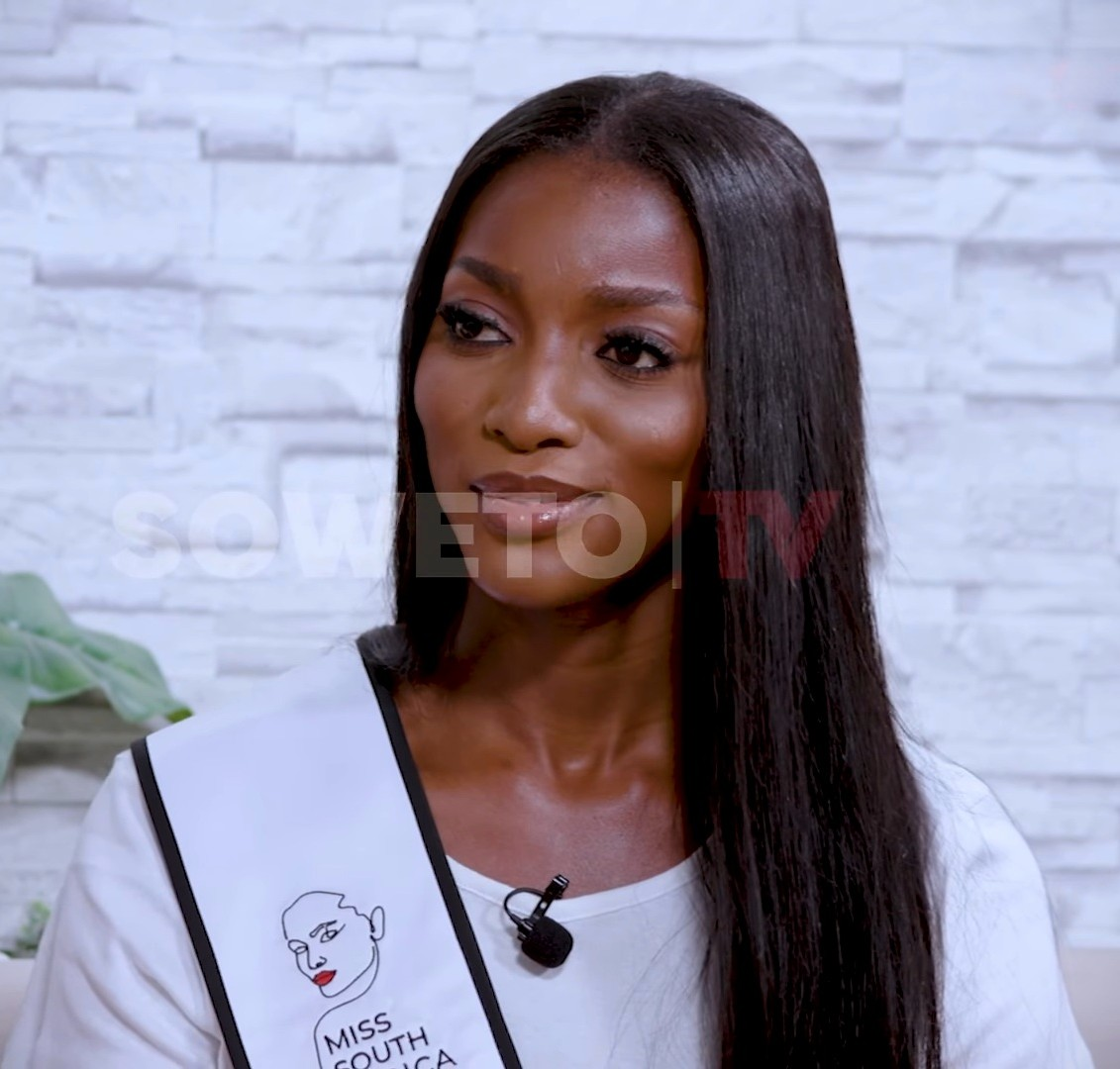
Luyanda Zuma, first representative of South Africa at Miss Charm

Miss Charm South Africa was held for the first time in October 2025.

== Titleholders ==
- : Declared the winner
- : Finished as a runner-up or top 5/6 qualification
- : Finished as one of the finalists or semifinalists
- : Finished as a special awards winner

Year	Hometown	Miss Charm South Africa	Placement at Miss Charm	Special award	Note
2026	Inanda	Anelisa Nxele	TBA	TBA	
2025	Mpumalanga	Londekile Nonyane	Unplaced		

== South African representatives ==
- : Declared the winner
- : Finished as a runner-up or top 5/6 qualification
- : Finished as one of the finalists or semifinalists
- : Finished as a special awards winner

Year	Hometown	Miss South Africa	Placement at Miss Charm	Special award	Note
2026	Inanda	Anelisa Nxele	TBA	TBA	Top 30 at Miss South Africa 2023
2025	Mpumalanga	Londekile Luyanda Nonyane	Unplaced		
2024	Newcastle	Silindokuhle Mbali Dlamini	Top 20		Unplaced at Miss Asia Pacific International 2019; Top 35 at Miss South Africa 2019
2023	Pietermaritzburg	Luyanda Zuma	Top 6		1st Runner-Up at Miss South Africa 2025; Top 10 finalists at Miss South Africa 2022
