= Rinanda Maharani =

Indonesian beauty pageant titleholder

- Born: Rinanda Aprillya Maharani; April 21, 2002 (age 24); Samarinda, East Kalimantan, Indonesia
- Education: Airlangga University
- Height: 170 cm (5 ft 7 in)
- Beauty pageant titleholder
- Title: Puteri Indonesia Pendidikan 2025; Miss Charm Indonesia 2025
- Major competitions: Puteri Indonesia 2025; (3rd Runner-up – Puteri Indonesia Pendidikan 2025); Miss Charm 2025; (2nd Runner-up)

Rinanda Aprillya Maharani (born 21 April 2002) is an Indonesian beauty pageant titleholder, who won Miss Charm Indonesia 2025. She represented Indonesia at Miss Charm 2025, and was the second runner-up.

== Early life ==
Rinanda was born in 2003 in Samarinda, East Kalimantan, Indonesia. She studied International Relations at Airlangga University.

== Pageantry ==
As Puteri Indonesia East Kalimantan 2025, Rinanda advocated for "Sustainability for Future Beauty with Jejak Pesona Kutim". She focused on preserving culture, the environment, and promoting the local economy through sustainable tourism.

=== Puteri Remaja Indonesia 2019 ===
Rinanda Joined Puteri Remaja Indonesia 2019. She crowned as Puteri Indonesia Remaja Pendidikan 2019.

=== Putri Pariwisata Indonesia 2020 ===
Rinanda reached the top 10 of Putri Pariwisata Indonesia 2019, and won the fan vote award.

=== Puteri Indonesia 2025 ===
Rinanda represented East Kalimantan at Puteri Indonesia 2025, winning the Puteri Indonesia Pendidikan 2025 title. In the competition she won several special awards: Puteri Indonesia Intelegensia, Puteri Indonesia Talent, and Best Evening Gown. Rinanda is also involved in supporting the development of the Indonesian Capital City (IKN) in East Kalimantan. She sees this development as an opportunity to boost the region's potential and empower local communities. At Puteri Indonesia 2025, Rinanda planned to incorporate the spirit of IKN development into her vision for Indonesia's future.

=== Miss Charm 2025 ===
Rinanda became Miss Charm Indonesia 2025 to participate in Miss Charm 2025 in Vietnam.

At the contest on December 12, 2025, she was second runner-up at Miss Charm 2025, becoming the second Indonesian to achieve this after Miss Charm Indonesia 2023 Olivia Tan.

Awards and achievements
Preceded by Nguyễn Thị Quỳnh Nga	2nd Runner-up Miss Charm; 2025	Succeeded by Incumbent
Preceded by Melati Tedja	Miss Charm Indonesia; 2025	Succeeded by Gisela Thesa
