= Annabelle McDonnell =

Filipino beauty pageant titleholder

Annabelle Mae McDonnell
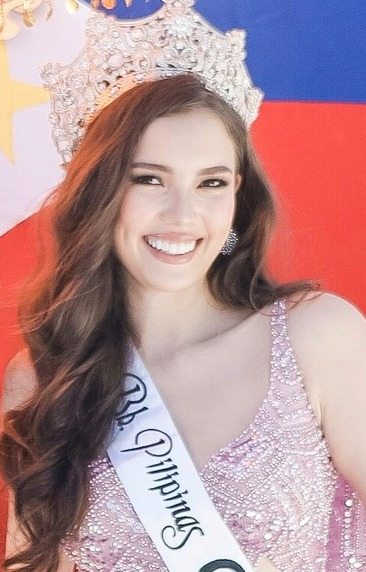
- McDonnell in 2025
- Born: Annabelle Mae Tate McDonnell; May 23, 2000 (age 26); United Kingdom
- Education: De La Salle–College of Saint Benilde (BA)
- Height: 1.75 m (5 ft 9 in)
- Beauty pageant titleholder
- Title: Miss Charm Philippines 2023; Binibining Pilipinas Globe 2025
- Major competitions: Miss Universe Philippines 2022; (1st Runner-Up); Miss Charm 2023; (1st Runner-Up); Binibining Pilipinas 2025; (Winner – Binibining Pilipinas Globe 2025); The Miss Globe 2025; (Top 11)

Annabelle Mae Tate McDonnell (born May 23, 2000) is a Filipino beauty pageant titleholder. She was crowned Binibining Pilipinas Globe 2025 and previously held the title of Miss Charm Philippines 2023. She then represented the Philippines at The Miss Globe 2025, where she finished in the top 11, and at Miss Charm 2023, where she placed as the first runner-up.

== Early life and education ==
Annabelle Mae Tate McDonnell was born on May 23, 2000, in the United Kingdom, raised in Iligan, Philippines, and lived in various parts of Lanao del Norte. Orphaned at a young age and raised by her uncle, she became financially independent at 15. She supported herself and her family by selling bread and secondhand clothing while funding her education through scholarship grants. These grants allowed her to continue her studies while contributing to household expenses. She graduated cum laude with a degree in Consular and Diplomatic Affairs from De La Salle–College of Saint Benilde.

McDonnell has also worked as a radio host promoting youth socio-political awareness and as a special operations officer in the Office of the Mayor of Iligan.

== Pageantry ==
=== Early pageants ===
McDonnell began competing in local pageants during her youth. Her titles include Miss Iligan 2018, Miss Lanao del Norte 2019, second runner-up in Miss Millennial Philippines 2019, and Miss Kuyamis 2022.

=== Miss Universe Philippines 2022 ===
McDonnell was first runner-up at Miss Universe Philippines 2022, where Celeste Cortesi of Pasay won the title. She was later appointed to represent the country at Miss Charm 2023 in Ho Chi Minh City, Vietnam.

=== Miss Charm 2023 ===
In 2023, McDonnell was first runner-up at Miss Charm 2023, with the title won by Luma Russo of Brazil.

=== Binibining Pilipinas 2025 ===
In 2025, McDonnell represented Iligan City at the 61st edition of Binibining Pilipinas, held on June 15, 2025, at the Smart Araneta Coliseum in Quezon City, Philippines.

She was one of the top 14 finalists, and during the question-and-answer portion, she addressed the issues of hunger and malnutrition, drawing from her personal experiences. She emphasized resilience and perseverance, urging others not to let rock bottom define them, but to use it as a springboard for growth. At the end of the event, she was crowned Binibining Pilipinas Globe 2025 by Jasmin Bungay of Pampanga, the second runner-up of The Miss Globe 2024.

=== The Miss Globe 2025 ===
McDonnell represented the Philippines at The Miss Globe 2025, which took place on October 15 in Albania, where she finished in the Top 11 and was the winner of the Head-to-Head Challenge.

== Advocacy ==
McDonnell has been involved in volunteer work supporting children and has participated in organizations such as Save the Children.

Awards and achievements
Preceded by Jasmin Bungay (Pampanga)	Binibining Pilipinas Globe; 2025	Succeeded by Sasha Lacuna (Tarlac)
New title	Miss Charm; 1st Runner-Up; 2023	Succeeded by Alana Deutsher-Moore
Preceded by Ashley Montenegro (Makati)	Miss Charm Philippines; 2023	Succeeded by Krishnah Gravidez (Baguio)
Preceded by Maureen Wroblewitz (Pangasinan)	Miss Universe Philippines; 1st Runner-Up; 2022	Succeeded by CJ Opiaza (Zambales)
