= Miss Charm 2024 =

2nd Miss Charm beauty pageant

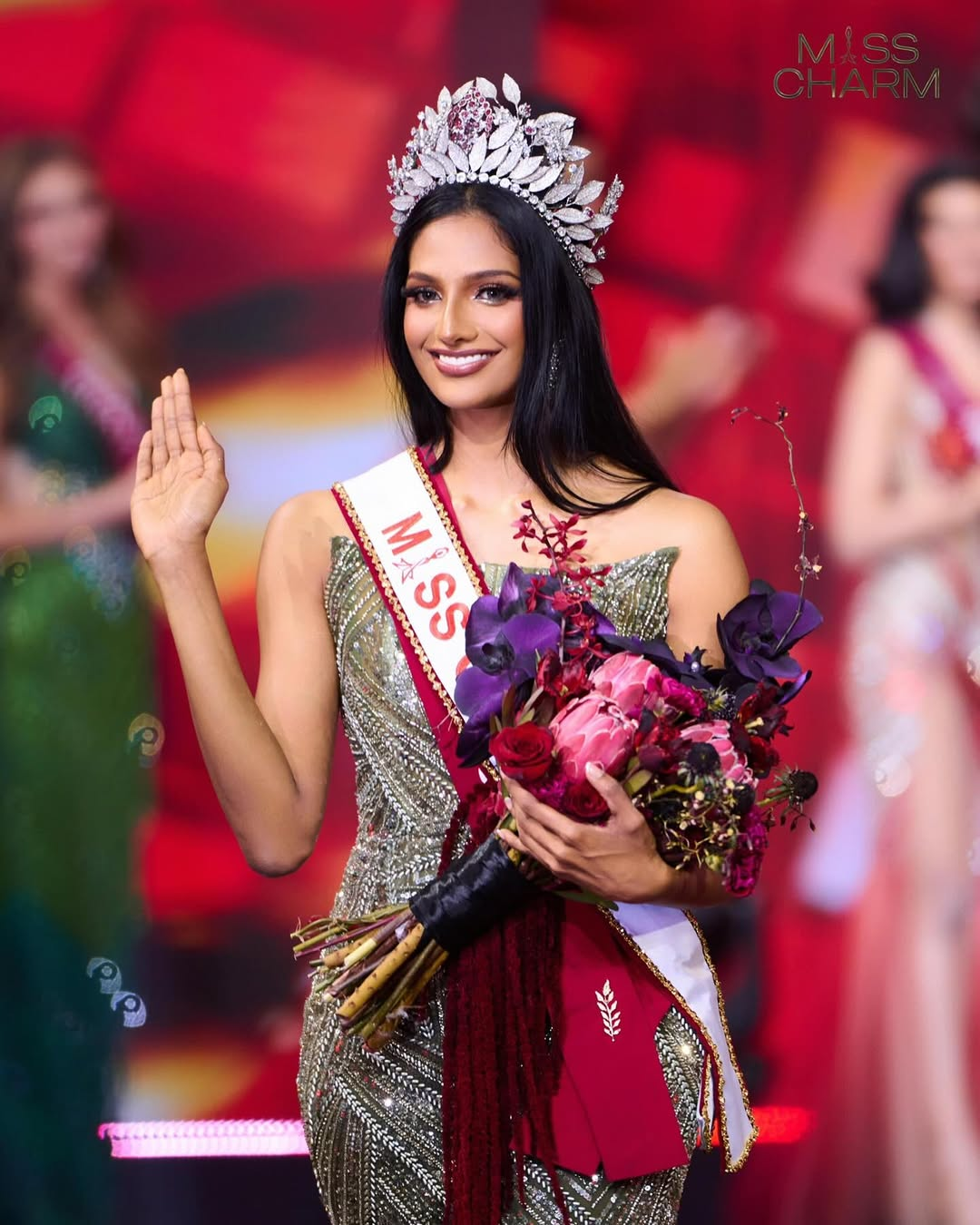
- Rashmita Rasindran
- Date: 21 December 2024
- Presenters: (Preliminary): Laine Nguyễn; Olivia Tan; (Finale): Angelee delos Reyes; Dustin Phúc Nguyễn; Laine Nguyễn
- Entertainment: (Preliminary): Adam Lam; Han Sara; (Finale): Hoàng Mỹ An; My My; Phạm Hồng Minh
- Venue: Nguyen Du Stadium, Ho Chi Minh City, Vietnam
- Broadcaster: YouTube
- Entrants: 36
- Placements: 20
- Debuts: Albania; Australia; Belarus; Canada; Ecuador; El Salvador; France; Montenegro; Namibia; New Zealand; Nigeria; Romania; United States
- Withdrawals: Argentina; Bangladesh; Cambodia; Chile; Costa Rica; Dominican Republic; Eritrea; Myanmar; Nicaragua; Pakistan; Portugal; Singapore; South Sudan; Ukraine; Wales
- Winner: Rashmita Rasindran; Malaysia
- Best National Costume: Quỳnh Nga Nguyễn (Vietnam)

External videos
- Final show
- Preliminary competition

Miss Charm 2024 was the second edition Miss Charm pageant, held at Nguyen Du Stadium in Ho Chi Minh City, Vietnam on 21 December 2024.

At the end of the event, Luma Russo of Brazil crowned Rashmita Rasindran of Malaysia as her successor.

Contestants from thirty-six countries and territories participated in the pageant.

== Background ==
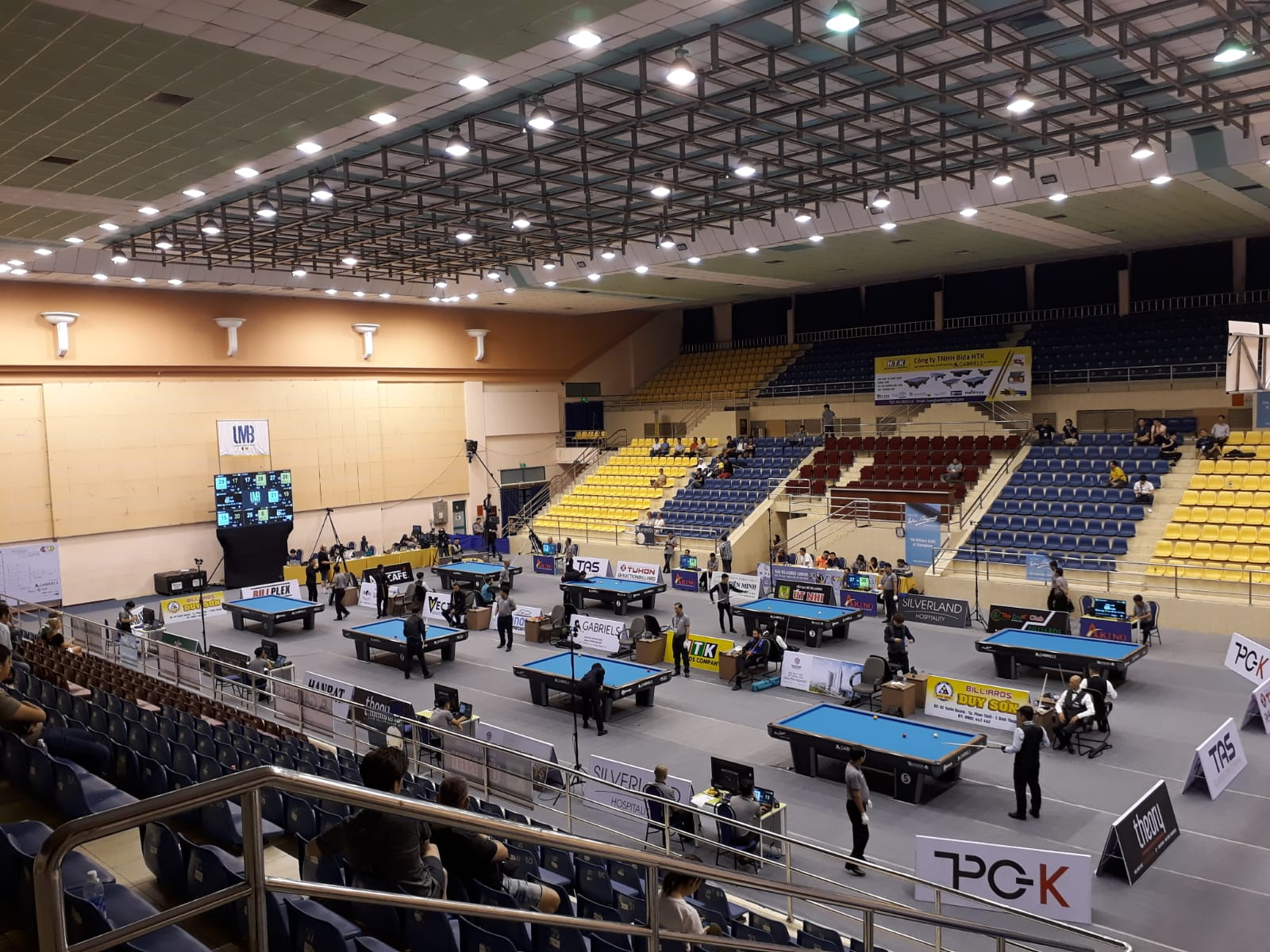
Nguyen Du Stadium, the venue of Miss Charm 2024

=== Location and date ===
On 24 June 2024, the Miss Charm Organization announced that the competition would take place in Los Angeles, California, United States, between 12 and 24 August 2024. However, on 1 August, the event was postponed after eleven contestants were found to be ineligible for U.S. visas.

On 14 October, the organization announced that the competition would be relocated to Ho Chi Minh City, Vietnam, and rescheduled to take place between 9 and 21 December 2024.

The preliminary and final competitions were held at Nguyen Du Stadium in Ho Chi Minh City, with the preliminary competition taking place on 18 December and the final competition on 21 December 2024.

=== Selection of participants ===
==== Replacements ====
In this edition, eleven contestants served as replacement representatives for previously announced delegates.

Country/Territory	Original Representative	Replacement Representative
Ecuador	Georgette Kalil	Delary Stoffers
England	Chloe McEwen	Francesca Ziérre
Indonesia	Lulu Zaharani	Melati Tedja
Mexico	Tania Estrada	Xiadani Saucedo
Netherlands	Saartje Langstraat	Rosalie Hooft
Philippines	Krishnah Gravidez	Kayla Carter
Russia	Anna Linnikova	Polina Ivanova
South Korea	Dorim Kim	Nari Kim
Thailand	Arabella Gregory	Pornsirikul Puatha
Venezuela	Anna Blanco	Fernanda Rojas
Zambia	Cecilia Kongwa	Sheila Singelengele

==== Debuts and withdrawals ====
This edition featured the debut of Albania, Australia, Belarus, Canada, Ecuador, El Salvador, France, Montenegro, Namibia, New Zealand, Nigeria, Romania, and the United States.

Several countries had initially announced representatives, including Hungary, Iran, Italy, Kazakhstan, Paraguay, Senegal, Somalia, and Spain, but later withdrew after their representatives resigned their titles and the respective organizations were unable to appoint replacements.

Bangladesh, Cambodia, Costa Rica, the Dominican Republic, Eritrea, Myanmar, Nicaragua, Portugal, Singapore, South Sudan, Ukraine, and Wales also withdrew after their respective organizations failed to appoint a delegate.

Additionally, Alina Akselrad of Argentina,Sofía Depassier of Chile, and Sawera Saeed of Pakistan, who were initially appointed as representatives, relinquished their titles. As the national license holders were unable to find replacements, their countries subsequently withdrew.

== Results ==
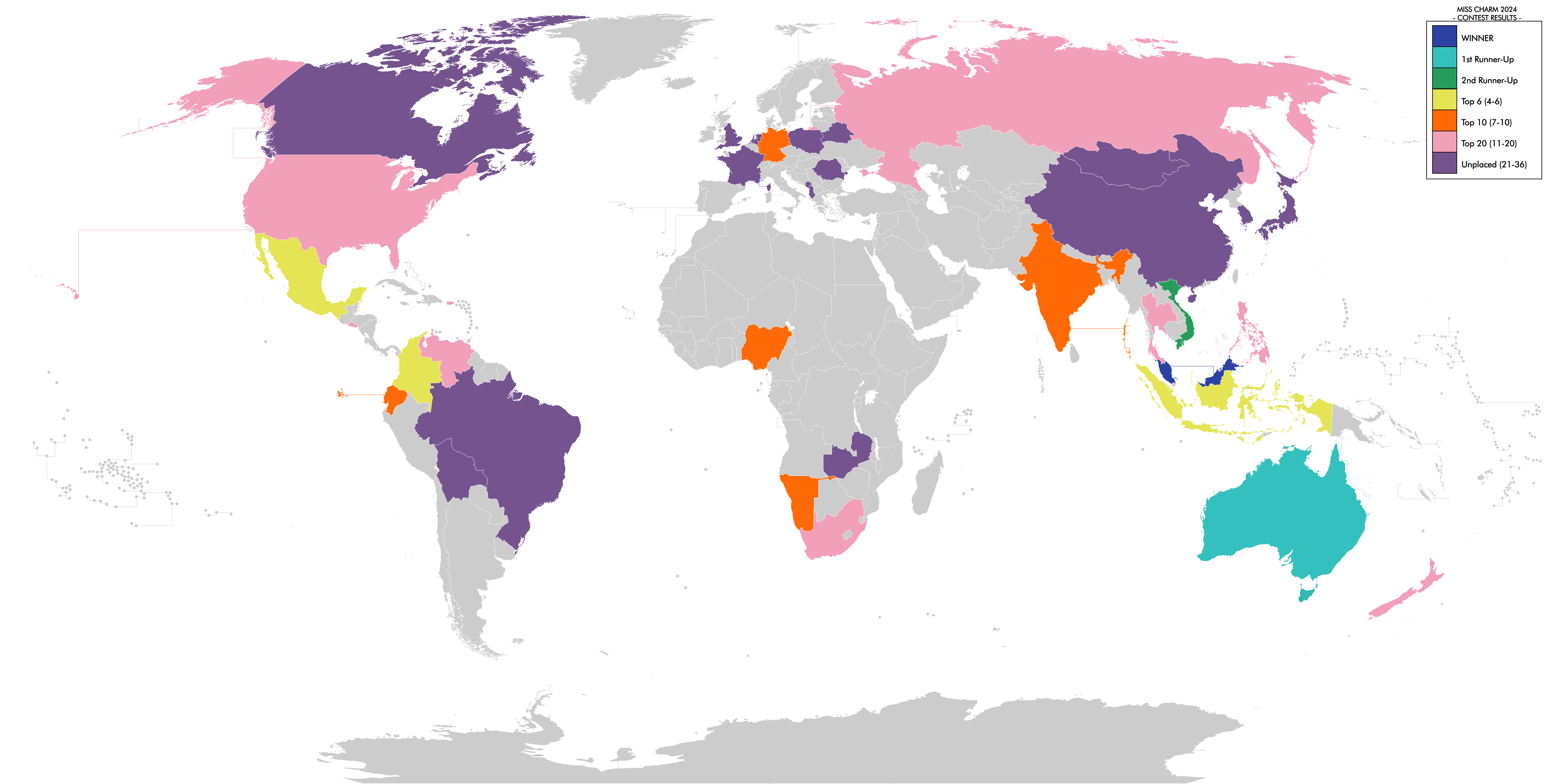
Miss Charm 2024 participating nations and results

=== Placements ===
Placement	Contestant
Miss Charm 2024	Malaysia – Rashmita Rasindran
1st Runner-Up	Australia – Alana Moore
2nd Runner-Up	Vietnam – Quỳnh Nga Nguyễn §
Top 6	Colombia – Vanesa Velásquez; Indonesia – Melati Tedja; Mexico – Xiadani Saucedo
Top 10	Ecuador – Delary Stoffers; Germany – Mariana Ignat; India – Shivangi Desai; Namibia – Georgia Garises; Nigeria – Hannah Iribhogbe
Top 20	El Salvador – Alejandra Guajardo; New Zealand – Georgia Waddington; Philippines – Kayla Carter; Puerto Rico – Carolina Gómez; Russia – Polina Ivanova; South Africa – Mbali Dlamini; Thailand – Pornsirikul Puatha; United States – Angel Reyes; Venezuela – Fernanda Rojas

§ – Placed into the top 6 through Miss Popular Vote

==== Special awards ====
Award	Contestant
Best Face	New Zealand – Georgia Waddington
Best in Evening Gown	India – Shivangi Desai
Best in Interview	Vietnam - Quỳnh Nga Nguyễn
Best National Costume	Vietnam - Quỳnh Nga Nguyễn
Miss Popular Vote	Vietnam - Quỳnh Nga Nguyễn
Best in Social Media	Indonesia – Melati Tedja
Best in Swimsuit	Colombia – Vanesa Velásquez
Miss Friendly Beauty	China - Yue Yue Zhu

== Pageant ==
=== Format ===
The results of the in-depth interviews, along with the preliminary competition—which consisted of the swimsuit and evening gown segments—determined the twenty semifinalists who advanced to the next round. The semifinalists competed in the swimsuit segment, after which the number of contestants was reduced to ten.

The top ten then competed in the evening gown segment, from which five finalists were selected to advance to the question-and-answer round. In addition, the winner of the online voting advanced directly as the sixth finalist. If the online voting winner had already been selected by the judges, the direct entry was instead awarded to the delegate with the second-highest number of votes.

The six finalists competed in the interview round, after which the field was narrowed down to three contestants. The final three then answered one final question, following which the winner and two runners-up were announced.

== Contestants ==
Thirty-six contestants competed for the title.

Country/Territory	Contestant	Age (Note: Ages at the time of the pageant)	Hometown	Ref.
Albania	Megi Shehaj	22	Tirana	
Australia	Alana Moore	22	Gold Coast	
Belarus	Vitaliya Svetasheva	18	Minsk	
Bolivia	Fernanda Antelo	25	La Paz	
Brazil	Thaís Jagelski	25	Pérola d'Oeste	
Canada	Melanie Renaud	26	Windsor	
China	Yue Yue Zhu	22	Shanghai	
Colombia	Vanesa Velásquez	25	Cartago	
Ecuador	Delary Stoffers	24	Guayaquil	
El Salvador	Alejandra Guajardo	28	Cabañas	
England	Francesca Ziérre	25	Nottingham	
France	Alison Carrasco	28	Toulouse	
Germany	Mariana Ignat	23	Frankfurt	
India	Shivangi Desai	22	Mumbai	
Indonesia	Melati Tedja	25	Surabaya	
Japan	Tomoyo Ikeda	26	Naha	
Malaysia	Rashmita Rasindran	24	Kuala Lumpur	
Mexico	Xiadani Saucedo	24	Mexico City	
Mongolia	Buyanjargal Bazarsad	21	Ulaanbaatar	
Montenegro	Ana Dedvukaj	19	Tuzi	
Namibia	Georgia Garises	18	Windhoek	
Netherlands	Rosalie Hooft	23	Tiel	
New Zealand	Georgia Waddington	22	Christchurch	
Nigeria	Hannah Iribhogbe	23	Ekpoma	
Philippines	Kayla Carter	27	Talisay	
Poland	Adrianna Koperska	20	Poznań	
Puerto Rico	Carolina Gómez	27	Salinas	
Romania	Georgiana Murariu	20	Timișoara	
Russia	Polina Ivanova	19	Engels	
South Africa	Mbali Dlamini	27	Durban	
South Korea	Nari Kim	20	Seoul	
Thailand	Pornsirikul Puatha	26	Prachuap Khiri Khan	
United States	Angel Reyes	29	Chicago	
Venezuela	Fernanda Rojas	21	Mérida	
Vietnam	Quỳnh Nga Nguyễn	28	Hanoi	
Zambia	Sheila Singelengele	20	Lusaka	
