= Luyanda Zuma =

South African beauty pageant titleholder (born 2001)

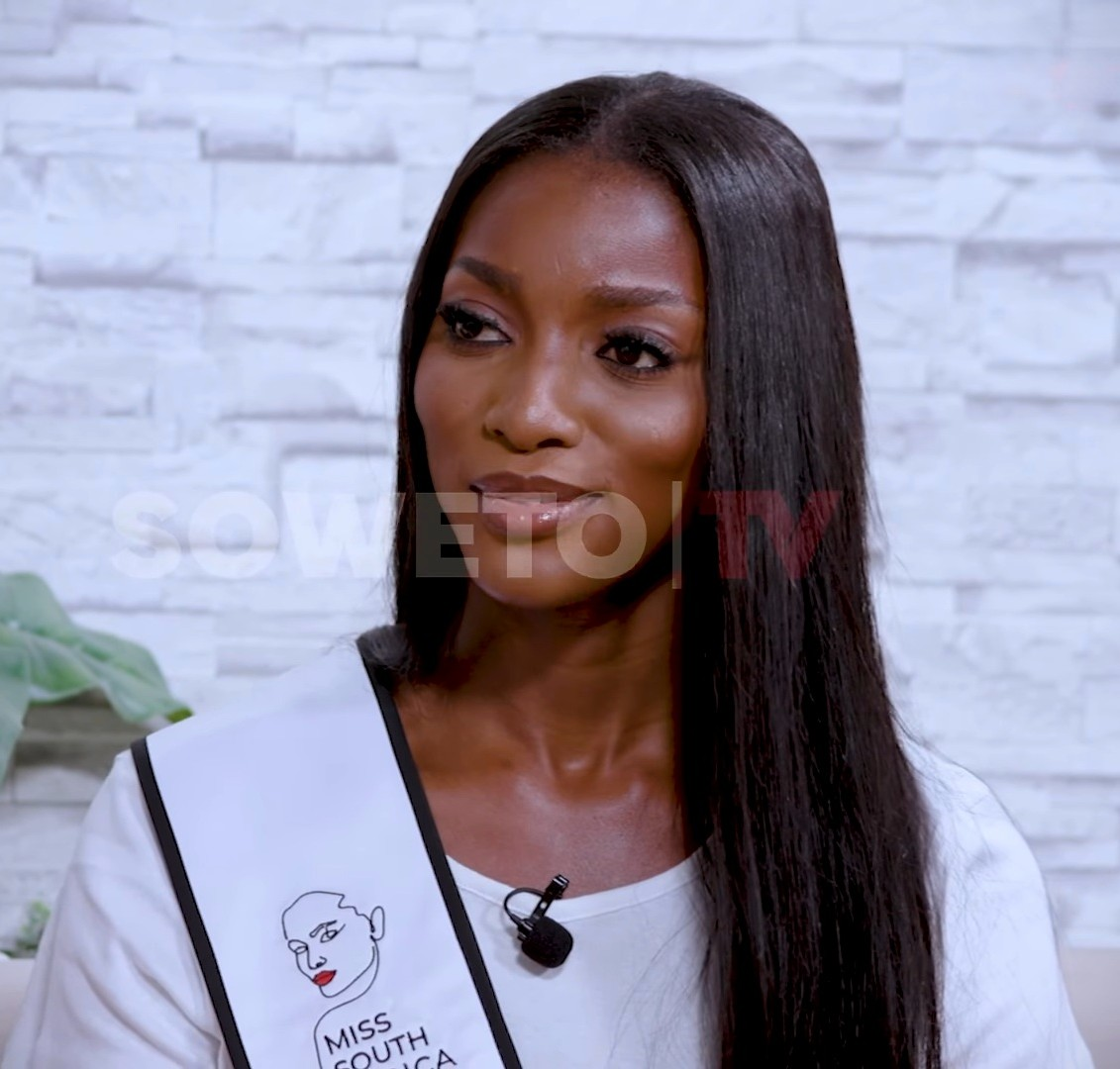
- Zuma as Miss South Africa 2025 finalist
- Born: Luyanda Zuma; 3 December 2001 (age 24); Pietermaritzburg, KwaZulu Natal, South Africa
- Education: AFDA
- Occupations: Model; actress; influencer
- Height: 1.76 m (5 ft 9 in)
- Beauty pageant titleholder
- Title: Miss Charm South Africa 2023
- Hair color: Black
- Eye color: Brown
- Major competitions: Miss South Africa 2022; (Top 10); Miss Charm 2023; (Top 6); Miss South Africa 2025; (1st Runner-Up)

Luyanda Zuma (born 3 December 2001) is a South African actress, influencer and beauty pageant titleholder who was crowned the first ever Miss Charm South Africa 2023. She represented South Africa in Vietnam and was placed in the Top 6.

She was participated in Miss South Africa 2022 where she was placed in the Top 10 and she is currently Miss South Africa 2025 1st Runner-Up. Beside being a beauty pageant titleholder, she has played starring role in Mzansi Magic notable series Shaka iLembe as Liyana and lead role teen drama Obstruction as Zenokuhle where she rose to prominence.

== Early life ==
Zuma was born and raised in Pietermaritzburg, KwaZulu-Natal, South Africa. She grew up in a close knit family with three siblings, her mother is a primary school principal and her father works as a forensic investigator. From a young age, she showed interest in sports and participated in field hockey, and later represented KwaZulu-Natal in provincial hockey. She attended the AFDA, The School for the Creative Economy in Johannesburg, where she pursued a Bachelor of Arts degree in Live Performance.

== Career ==
Besides her pageantry career, Zuma is also an actress. In 2022, she made her television debut in the drama series Uzulu Nomhlaba as Zama. She rose to prominence after playing the lead role of Zenokuhle in a Mzansi Magic drama Obstruction. That same year, she appeared in the Showmax television series Forever Yena portraying the character Naomi.

In 2025, she later starred as Liyana in the popular cultural television series Shaka iLembe season 2. She also had a recurring role in the Showmax drama Adulting season 3 appearing as Mapaseka's close friend. In October 2025, she bagged the starring role in a local drama series Levels as Captain/Pilot Mo while participating in 67th edition of Miss South Africa. In April 2026, she joined Isitha: The Enemy season 4 as Dabulamanzi, powerful and troubled traditional healer. She was a host of Metro FM Music Awards 2026 for the black carpet show with Lamiez Holworthy.

== Endorsements ==
She was announced as brand ambassador for the sanitary brand Always, positioning her as a public figure for women's confidence and empowerment. In March 2026, she was appointed as the first Global Goodwill Ambassador for Women African Tourism Board (WATB).

== Pageantry ==
=== Miss South Africa 2022 ===
In 2022, Zuma began her beauty pageant career where she entered the 64th edition of the Miss South Africa pageant. She was selected as one of the Top 10 finalists on 13 June 2022. She represented KwaZulu-Natal hailing from Pietermaritzburg in the competition.

=== Miss Charm 2023 ===
In 2023, Zuma represented South Africa at the international pageant Miss Charm 2023 held in Ho Chi Minh City, Vietnam. She was designated as Miss Charm South Africa 2023 by the pageant's national organisers becoming the first South African beauty pageant to held the title. During the competition, she was advanced into the Top 6 finalists.

=== Miss South Africa 2025 ===
In 2025, Zuma returned to the Miss South Africa pageant, three years after her first appearance in 2022. Her entry video went viral with millions of views and likes all over the internet and social media platforms. She was officially announced as one of the Top 10 finalists on 16 September 2025. She entered the competition with a renewed sense of purpose and using the platform to uplift young people and communities. On 25 October 2025, she was crowned the new Miss South Africa 2025 1st Runner-Up where by Qhawekazi Mazaleni was crowned the winner.

==== Controversy ====
After Zuma was crowned the new Miss South Africa 2025 first runner-up, the Miss South Africa Organisation warned the public about a scam using her name to solicit fake donations. A social media post falsely claimed to raise R20000 on her behalf. She denied any involvement and urged her followers not to engage with the fraudulent campaign.

== Filmography ==
Year	Title	Role	Notes
2022	Uzulu Nomhlaba	Zama	Recurring role
2024	Forever Yena	Naomi	Starring role
2024	Obstruction	Zenokuhle	Lead role
2025	Adulting	Mapaseka's friend	Recurring role
2025	Shaka iLembe	Liyana	Starring role
2025	Levels	Pilot Mo	Starring role
2026	Isitha: The Enemy	Dabulamanzi	Supporting role
2026	Metro FM Music Awards	Herself	Black carpet host

== Awards and nominations ==
Year	Association	Category	Nominated works	Result	Ref.
2025	Feather Awards	Hot Chick of the Year	Herself	Won	
2025	National Film and TV Awards	Best Newcomer	As Liyana on Shaka iLembe season 2	Nominated	
2026	Africa Choice Awards	Most Promising Female Movie Star of the Year	Herself	Pending	

Awards and achievements
New title	Miss Charm South Africa; 2023	Succeeded by Silindokuhle Mbali Dlamini
