= Melati Tedja =

Indonesian beauty pageant titleholder (born 1999)

- 特賈
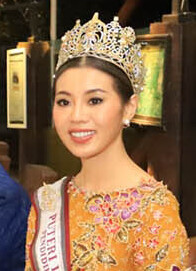
- Tedja in 2024
- Born: 7 July 1999 (age 27); Palembang, South Sumatra, Indonesia
- Education: Pelita Harapan University (SH)
- Height: 1.74 m (5 ft 9 in)
- Beauty pageant titleholder
- Title: Puteri Indonesia Jawa Timur 2024; Puteri Indonesia Pendidikan & Kebudayaan 2024; Miss Charm Indonesia 2024
- Major competitions: Puteri Indonesia Jawa Timur 2022; (1st Runner-up); Puteri Indonesia Jawa Timur 2024; (Winner); Puteri Indonesia 2024; (3rd Runner-up – Puteri Indonesia Pendidikan & Kebudayaan 2024); Miss Charm 2024; (Top 6)

Melati Tedja (Chinese: 特賈; pinyin: Tè jiǎ; born 7 July 1999) is an Indonesian beauty pageant titleholder who was crowned Puteri Indonesia Pendidikan & Kebudayaan 2024. She was selected to represent Indonesia at the Miss Charm 2024 pageant held in Vietnam.

== Early life and education ==
Melati Tedja was born on 7 July 1999, in Palembang, South Sumatra. Her father comes from Banjarmasin in South Kalimantan and her mother from Palembang in South Sumatra. She was born and raised in Palembang before she and her family moved to Surabaya in East Java in 2008 when she was age nine. Tedja is of Chinese descent from her parents, and is the first daughter in her family.

Tedja attended Santa Maria Surabaya Junior High School, and then completed her high school studies at Petra 1 Surabaya Christian Senior High School in Surabaya. In 2021, she obtained a Bachelor of Laws (SH) from Pelita Harapan University in Jakarta.

== Pageantry ==
=== Miss Celebrity Indonesia 2016 ===
Tedja's first pageant was Miss Celebrity Indonesia 2016, where she represented Surabaya, on 13 October 2016, at Emtek's 6th Studio, Jakarta. She was unplaced, with the winner being Jasi Michelle Tumbel from Manado, North Sulawesi.

=== Puteri Indonesia Jawa Timur 2022 & 2024 ===
In 2021, she competed in the provincial contest for the selection of Puteri Indonesia Jawa Timur 2022, held at the Grand Mercure Ballroom, Surabaya, East Java on 1 October 2021. She achieved first runner-up to the winner, Adinda Cresheilla from Malang.

In 2024, Tedja competed again as a representative for Surabaya and won. The competition was held at the Novotel Samator Ballroom, Surabaya, East Java on 24 November 2023. She was crowned by her predecessor Yasinta Aurellia from Sidoarjo Regency. This win gave her the right to represent East Java province at Puteri Indonesia 2024.

=== Puteri Indonesia 2024 ===
After winning Puteri Indonesia Jawa Timur 2024, she then represented the province of East Java at the national beauty contest Puteri Indonesia 2024, on 8 March 2024, at the Plenary Hall, Jakarta Convention Center in Central Jakarta. The pageant was held as part of International Women's Day celebrations.

At the end of the event, Tedja was crowned the fourth winner with the title Puteri Indonesia Pendidikan & Kebudayaan 2024, and was crowned by her predecessor Dinda Nur Safira from Yogyakarta SR, third runner-up at Puteri Indonesia 2023. She also received the Best Traditional Costume award.

Tedja's win maintained East Java's position as the province that won one of the final titles of the contest for 4 consecutive editions, after Ayu Maulida won Puteri Indonesia at Puteri Indonesia 2020, Adinda Cresheilla won Puteri Indonesia Pariwisata at Puteri Indonesia 2022, and Yasinta Aurellia won Puteri Indonesia Lingkungan at Puteri Indonesia 2023.

=== Miss Charm 2024 ===
In May 2024, Tedja was appointed to represent Indonesia at Miss Charm 2024. Previously, the organization had appointed Puteri Indonesia Pariwisata 2023 Lulu Zaharani to compete in this edition, but due to the long postponement of the contest, she finally decided to resign and agreed to be replaced.

== Advocacies and platforms ==
Tedja is an educational activist, philanthropist and advocate who focuses on education in Indonesia and children's rights. Since May 2018, she has joined 1000 Guru (1000 Teachers), a community platform whose aim is to provide guidance and access to education in poor areas of Indonesia. On social media, Tedja initiated the #MELiveTheDream campaign to support her work.

Awards and achievements
Preceded by Yasinta Aurellia	Puteri Indonesia Jawa Timur; 2024	Succeeded by Firsta Yufi
Preceded by Dinda Nur Safira (Yogyakarta) (as 3rd Runner-Up)	Puteri Indonesia Pendidikan & Kebudayaan; 2024	Succeeded by Rinanda Maharani (East Kalimantan) (as Puteri Indonesia Pendidikan)
Preceded by Olivia Tan	Miss Charm Indonesia; 2024	Succeeded by Rinanda Maharani (East Kalimantan)
