= Georgia Waddington =

New Zealander beauty pageant titleholder

- Education: International Travel College of New Zealand
- Beauty pageant titleholder
- Title: Miss New Zealand 2025; Miss Charm New Zealand 2024; Miss Universe New Zealand 2026
- Major competitions: Miss New Zealand 2025; (Winner); Miss International 2023; (Unplaced); Miss Charm 2024; (Top 20); Miss Universe New Zealand 2026; (Winner); Miss Universe 2026; (TBD)

Georgia Waddington is a New Zealand beauty pageant titleholder who will represent New Zealand at Miss Universe 2026. She previously competed at Miss International 2023 and Miss Charm 2024.

== Early life and education ==
Georgia Waddington grew up in Christchurch and graduated from the International Travel College of New Zealand.

== Pageantry ==
Waddington won Miss New Zealand 2025 and went on to compete at Miss International 2023, where she was unplaced but received the Miss Photogenic award. She later competed at Miss Charm 2024, placing in the Top 20 and winning the Best Face award.

She won Miss Universe New Zealand 2026 and will represent New Zealand at Miss Universe 2026 in San Juan, Puerto Rico.

Awards and achievements
Preceded by Abby Sturgin	Miss Universe New Zealand; 2026	Incumbent
Preceded by –	Miss Charm New Zealand; 2024	Succeeded by –
Preceded by Lydia Smit	Miss New Zealand International; 2023	Succeeded by Samantha Poole
