= Nguyễn Thị Quỳnh Nga =

Vietnamese beauty pageant titleholder

- Born: Nguyễn Thị Quỳnh Nga; Hà Nội, Vietnam
- Education: Foreign Trade University

Nguyễn Thị Quỳnh Nga is a Vietnamese beauty pageant titleholder and MC. She represented Vietnam at Miss Charm 2024 in Vietnam.

== Early life ==
She graduated from the Foreign Trade University, having received a scholarship worth US$6000 (about 138.000.000 VND) in Israel.

== Pageantry ==
Nguyễn Thị Quỳnh Nga was a contestant in Miss Charm Vietnam 2024 and was unplaced. She represented Vietnam at Miss Charm 2024 in Vietnam.

Awards and achievements
Preceded by Đặng Dương Thanh Thanh Huyền	Miss Charm Vietnam; 2024	Succeeded by Ngô Thị Quỳnh Mai
Preceded by (Indonesia) Olivia Tan	2nd Runner-up Miss Charm; 2024	Succeeded by (Indonesia) Rinanda Maharani
