= Luisa Victoria Malz =

German beauty pageant titleholder

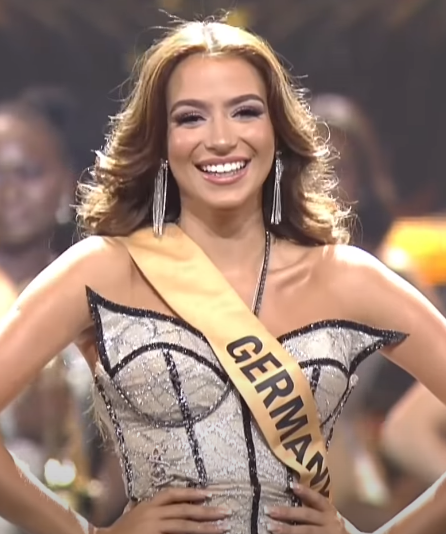
- Born: Luisa Victoria Malz; Dortmund, Germany
- Beauty pageant titleholder
- Title: Miss From Germany 2021; Miss Grand Germany 2021; Miss Supranational Germany 2024; Miss Charm Germany 2025
- Major competitions: Miss From Germany 2021; (Winner); Miss Grand International 2021; (Top 20); Miss Supranational 2024; (Top 25); Miss Charm 2025; (1st Runner-Up)

Luisa Victoria Malz is a German beauty pageant titleholder who won Miss From Germany 2021. She represented Germany at Miss Charm 2025 and was first runner-up. She also represent Germany at Miss Grand International 2021 and Miss Supranational 2024, where she was a semifinalist.

== Pageantry ==
=== Miss From Germany 2021 ===
Luisa Victoria Malz won the title of Miss From Germany 2021.

=== Miss Grand International 2021 ===
As Miss From Germany 2021, she represented Germany at Miss Grand International 2021 held in Thailand, where she reached the top 20.

=== Miss Supranational 2024 ===
Malz won Miss Supranational Germany 2024, and entered Miss Supranational 2024 in Poland. There she reached the top 25.

=== Miss Charm 2025 ===
Malz represented Germany at Miss Charm 2025 and was first runner-up.

Awards and achievements
Preceded by Alana Deutsher-Moore	1st Runner-up Miss Charm; 2025	Incumbent
Preceded by Mariana Ignat	Miss Charm Germany; 2025	Incumbent
Preceded by Mariana Ignat	Miss Supranational Germany; 2024	Succeeded by Anna Lakrini
Preceded by Arlinda Prenaj	Miss Grand Germany; 2021	Succeeded by Kim Kelly Braun
Preceded by Arlinda Prenaj	Miss From Germany; 2021	Succeeded by Kim Kelly Braun
