= Miss International 2023 =

61st Miss International pageant

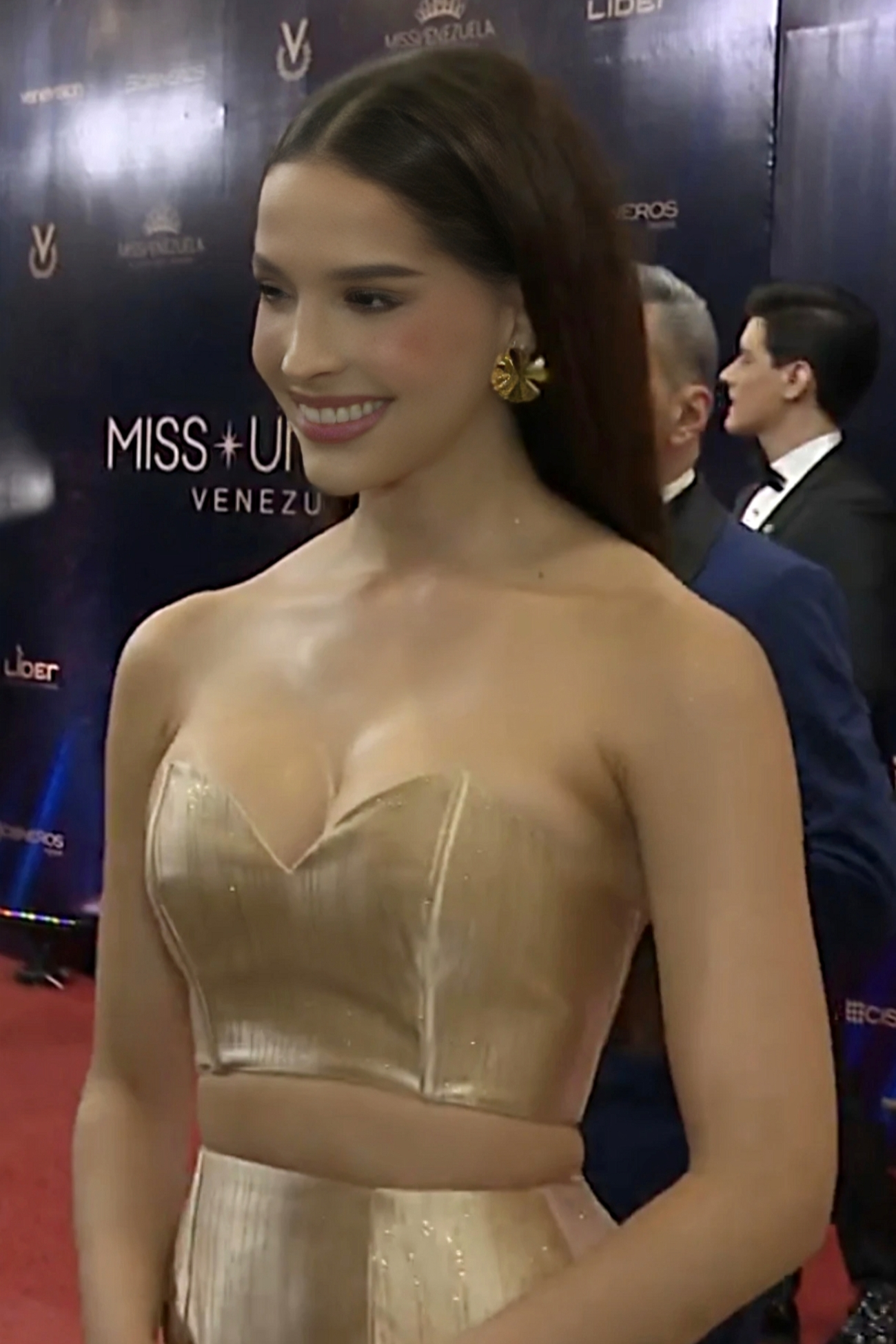
- Andrea Rubio
- Date: 26 October 2023
- Presenters: Tetsuya Bessho; Rachel Chan
- Entertainment: Harami-chan; Daishi Dance
- Venue: Yoyogi National Gymnasium, Shibuya, Tokyo, Japan
- Entrants: 70
- Placements: 15
- Debuts: Bangladesh; Lesotho; Pakistan
- Withdrawals: Belarus; Cape Verde; Germany; Haiti; Honduras; Italy; Kenya; Namibia; Northern Mariana Islands; Romania; Slovakia; Togo; Uzbekistan
- Returns: Angola; Côte d'Ivoire; Estonia; Ghana; Lithuania; Martinique; Moldova; Myanmar; Netherlands; Serbia; Sri Lanka; Tunisia; Uganda; Zimbabwe
- Winner: Andrea Rubio; Venezuela
- Best National Costume: Teresa Sara; Angola
- Photogenic: Georgia Waddington; New Zealand

External videos
- The 61st Miss International Beauty Pageant 2023

Miss International 2023 was the 61st edition of the Miss International pageant, held at the Yoyogi National Gymnasium in Shibuya, Tokyo, Japan, on 26 October 2023.

Jasmin Selberg of Germany crowned Andrea Rubio of Venezuela as her successor at the end of the event, marking the ninth time that Venezuela won the competition - the most wins in the pageant's history.

== Background ==
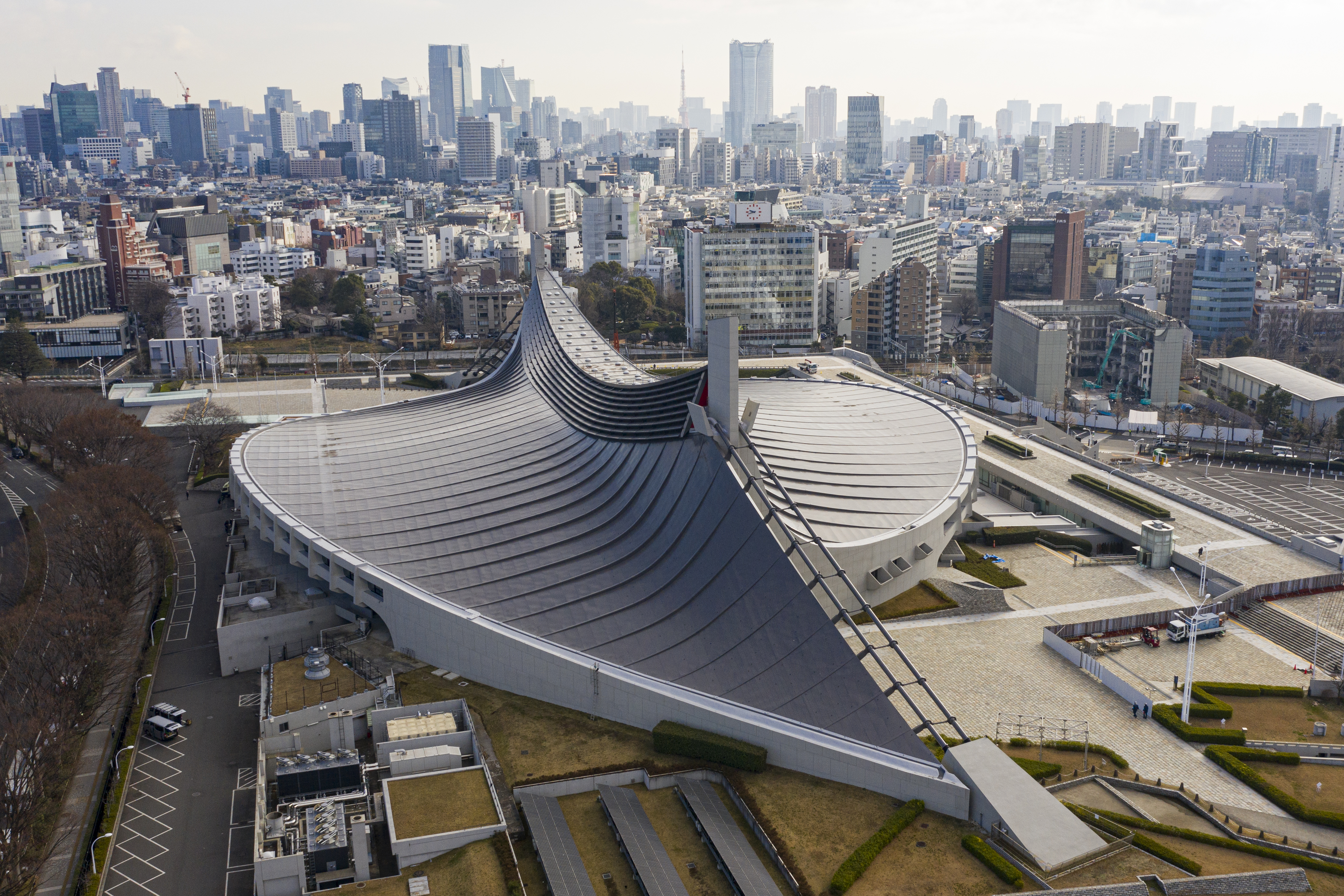
Yoyogi National Gymnasium, the venue of Miss International 2023

=== Location and date ===
On 30 March 2023, the Miss International Organization announced that the pageant was scheduled to take place at the Yoyogi National Gymnasium, instead of the usual Tokyo Dome City Hall, on 26 October 2023.

=== Selection of participants ===
According to Stephen Diaz, head director of the International Cultural Association, the non-profit organization that organizes the pageant, the organization has set the limit of the number of contestants competing to eighty. In the end, contestants from seventy countries and territories were selected to compete in the competition. Two contestants were selected to replace the original dethroned winner.

==== Replacements ====
Stacy Montero was appointed as the new representative of Costa Rica to the pageant after Shakira Graham, the original Miss International Costa Rica, relinquished her title due to problems with the organization. El Salvador appointed Daniella Hidalgo to represent in the pageant after Wendy Portillo, Queen of El Salvador 2023, relinquished her title for personal reasons.

==== Debuts, returns, and withdrawals ====
This edition marked the debuts of Bangladesh, Lesotho, and Pakistan, and the returns of Angola, Côte d'Ivoire, Equatorial Guinea, Estonia, Ghana, Lithuania, Martinique, Moldova, Myanmar, the Netherlands, Serbia, Sri Lanka, Tunisia, Uganda, and Zimbabwe. Angola, which last competed in 2004, Martinique in 2010, Estonia and Serbia in 2014, Lithuania in 2017, Moldova in 2018, while the others in 2019. Belarus, Cape Verde, Germany, Haiti, Honduras, Italy, Kenya, Namibia, the Northern Mariana Islands, Romania, Slovakia, Togo, and Uzbekistan withdrew after their respective organizations failed to hold a national competition or appoint a delegate.

== Results ==
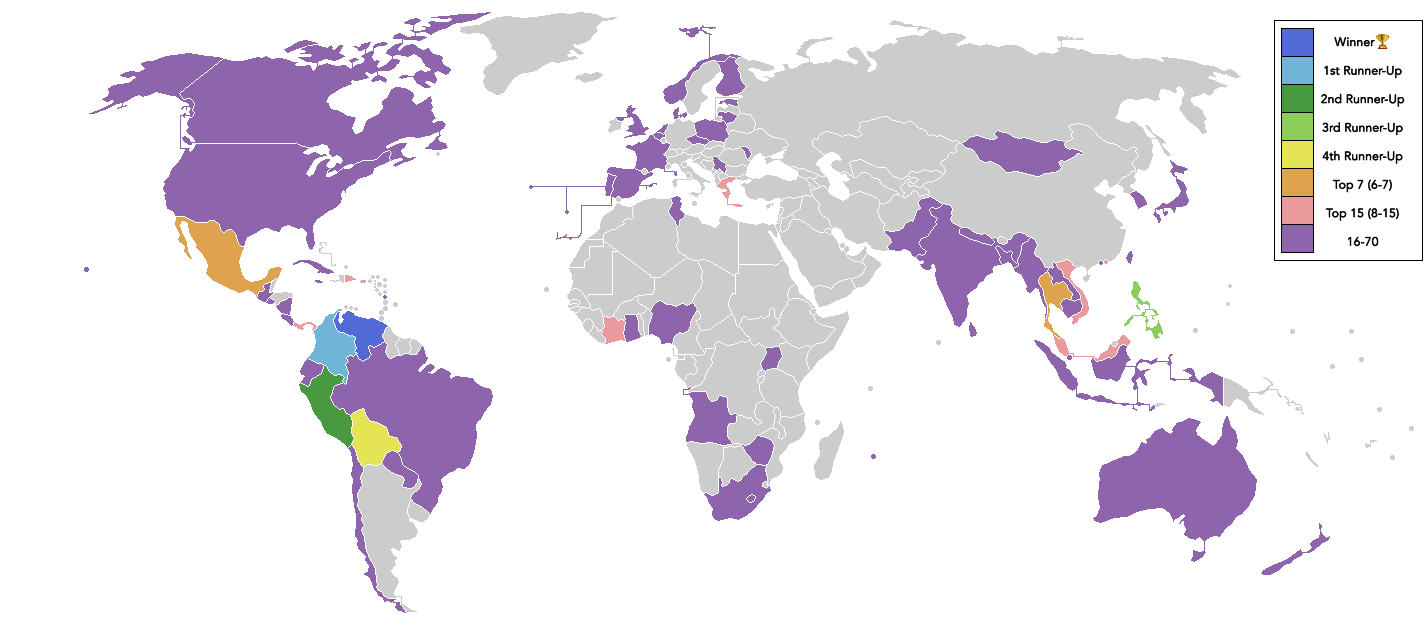
Miss International 2023 participating countries and territories

=== Placements ===
Placement	Contestant
Miss International 2023	Venezuela – Andrea Rubio
1st Runner-Up	Colombia – Sofía Osío
2nd Runner-Up	Peru – Camila Díaz
3rd Runner-Up	Philippines – Nicole Borromeo
4th Runner-Up	Bolivia – Vanessa Hayes
Top 7	Mexico – Itzia García §; Thailand – Supaporn Ritthipruek
Top 15	Côte d'Ivoire – Nassita Diako §; Dominican Republic – Yamilex Hernández; Greece – Zoi Asoumanaki; Hong Kong – Verna Leung; Malaysia – Cassandra Yap; Panama – Linette Clément; Puerto Rico – Amanda Solís; Vietnam – Nguyễn Phương Nhi §

§ – Voted into the Top 15 by the viewers

==== Continental Queens ====
Award	Contestant
Miss International Africa	Ghana – Mercy Jane Adorkor Pappoe
Miss International Americas	United States – Kenyatta Beazer
Miss International Asia-Pacific	Macau – Emily Yau
Miss International Europe	United Kingdom – Alisha Cowie

=== Special awards ===
Award	Contestant
Best in Evening Gown	Indonesia – Farhana Nariswari
Best in Swimsuit	Zimbabwe – Charlotte Muziri
Best National Costume	Angola – Teresa Sara
Miss Photogenic	New Zealand – Georgia Waddington

== Pageant ==
=== Format ===
The Miss International Organization introduced several specific changes to the format for this edition. During the final competition, all contestants will only parade in evening gowns. Fifteen semifinalists were chosen to compete in the final competition– twelve of which were chosen through the preliminary competition, while three were chosen through internet voting. The fifteen semi-finalists competed in the evening competition. Afterward, seven semifinalists advanced to compete in the question and answer round.

=== Judges ===
- Akemi Shimomura – President of the Miss International Organization
- Jasmin Selberg – Miss International 2022 from Germany
- Junko Koshino – Fashion designer
- Laurie Simpson – Miss International 1987 from Puerto Rico
- Norika Fujiwara – Miss Nippon 1992, model and actress
- Roberto Seminario – Ambassador Extraordinary and Plenipotentiary of the Republic of Peru to Japan
- Ryohei Miyata – Chairman of the Public Interest Incorporated Association, Nitten
- Senko Ikenobo – Headmaster designate at Ikenobō
- Soujitsu Kobori – Head of Kobori Enshu school of tea
- Supapan Pichaironarongsongkram – Chairwoman of Chao Phraya Express Boat

== Contestants ==
Seventy contestants competed for the title.

Country/Territory	Contestant	Age (Note: Ages at the time of the pageant)	Hometown
Angola	Teresa Sara	26	Soyo
Australia	Jazel Alarca	23	Armidale
Bangladesh	Farzana Yasmin Ananna	23	Khulna
Belgium	Jolien Pede	25	Zwalm
Bolivia	Vanessa Hayes	24	Santa Cruz de la Sierra
Brazil	Beatriz Goulart	22	Rio Grande do Norte
Cambodia	Alyna Somnang	21	Phnom Penh
Canada	Melanie Renaud	26	Windsor
Chile	Valerie Johnson	22	Valparaíso
Colombia	Sofía Osío	23	Barranquilla
Costa Rica	Stacy Montero	21	Limón
(Ivory Coast) Côte d'Ivoire	Nassita Diako	25	Dimbokro
Cuba	Sheyla Ravelo	24	San Antonio de los Baños
Czech Republic	Dominika Němečková	22	Prague
Denmark	Julie Brink	26	Copenhagen
Dominican Republic	Yamilex Hernández	23	La Vega
Ecuador	Georgette Kalil	21	Guayaquil
El Salvador	Daniella Hidalgo	24	Sensuntepeque
Estonia	Karolin Kippasto	26	Tallinn
Finland	Petra Hämäläinen	27	Savonlinna
France	Lysia Allaire	18	Mérignac
Ghana	Mercy Jane Adorkor Pappoe	25	Accra
Greece	Zoi Asoumanaki	22	Rethymno
Guatemala	María Ranee Díaz	24	Guatemala City
Hawaii	Maka'ala Perry	24	O'ahu
Hong Kong	Verna Leung	25	Kowloon
India	Praveena Aanjna	24	Udaipur
Indonesia	Farhana Nariswari	27	Bandung
Jamaica	Sabrina Johnson	22	Manchester Parish
Japan	Tamao Yoneyama	26	Tokyo
Laos	Aliya Inthavong	27	Bokeo
Lesotho	Boitumelo Sehlotho	21	Maseru
Lithuania	Irmina Preišegalavičiūtė	26	Vilnius
Macau	Emily Yau	28	Santo António
Malaysia	Cassandra Yap	24	Johor Bahru
Martinique	Pauline Thimon	26	Fort-de-France
Mauritius	Karishma Hurlall	23	Grand Port District
Mexico	Itzia García	22	Manzanillo
Moldova	Djulieta Calalb	19	Chișinău
Mongolia	Javkhlan Munguntsatsralt	24	Ulaanbaatar
Myanmar	Ei Ei Myint Aung Thein	23	Yangon
Nepal	Prasiddhy Shah	25	Lalitpur
Netherlands	Morgan Doelwijt	25	Utrecht
New Zealand	Georgia Waddington	21	Christchurch
Nicaragua	Leylani Leytón	20	Managua
Nigeria	Roseline Bolarinde	27	Lagos
Norway	Madeleine Malmberg	19	Fredrikstad
Pakistan	Misbah Arshad	26	Lahore
Panama	Linette Clément	26	Limón
Paraguay	Jazmín de la Sierra	24	Asunción
Peru	Camila Díaz	23	Chorrillos
Philippines	Nicole Borromeo	22	Cebu City
Poland	Julia Marcinkowska	22	Ślesin
Portugal	Lilene Vieira Serrão	27	Lisbon
Puerto Rico	Amanda Solís	25	Rio Grande
Serbia	Victorija Stojiljkovic	19	Niš
Singapore	Chavelle Chong	22	Singapore
South Africa	Jenique Botha	20	Edenvale
South Korea	Bobin Jung	24	Seoul
Spain	Claudia González	26	Agüimes
Sri Lanka	Umanda Bamunuachchi	21	Colombo
Taiwan	Anita Wang	26	Taipei
Thailand	Supaporn Ritthipruek	27	Lamphun
Tunisia	Mariam Ben Abroug	27	Tunis
Uganda	Emily Hope Muwanguzi	23	Kampala
United Kingdom	Alisha Cowie	24	Newcastle
United States	Kenyatta Beazer	25	Baltimore
Venezuela	Andrea Rubio	24	Caracas
Vietnam	Nguyễn Phương Nhi	21	Thanh Hóa
Zimbabwe	Charlotte Muziri	26	Masvingo
