= Miss South Africa 2025 =

67th Miss South Africa Pageant

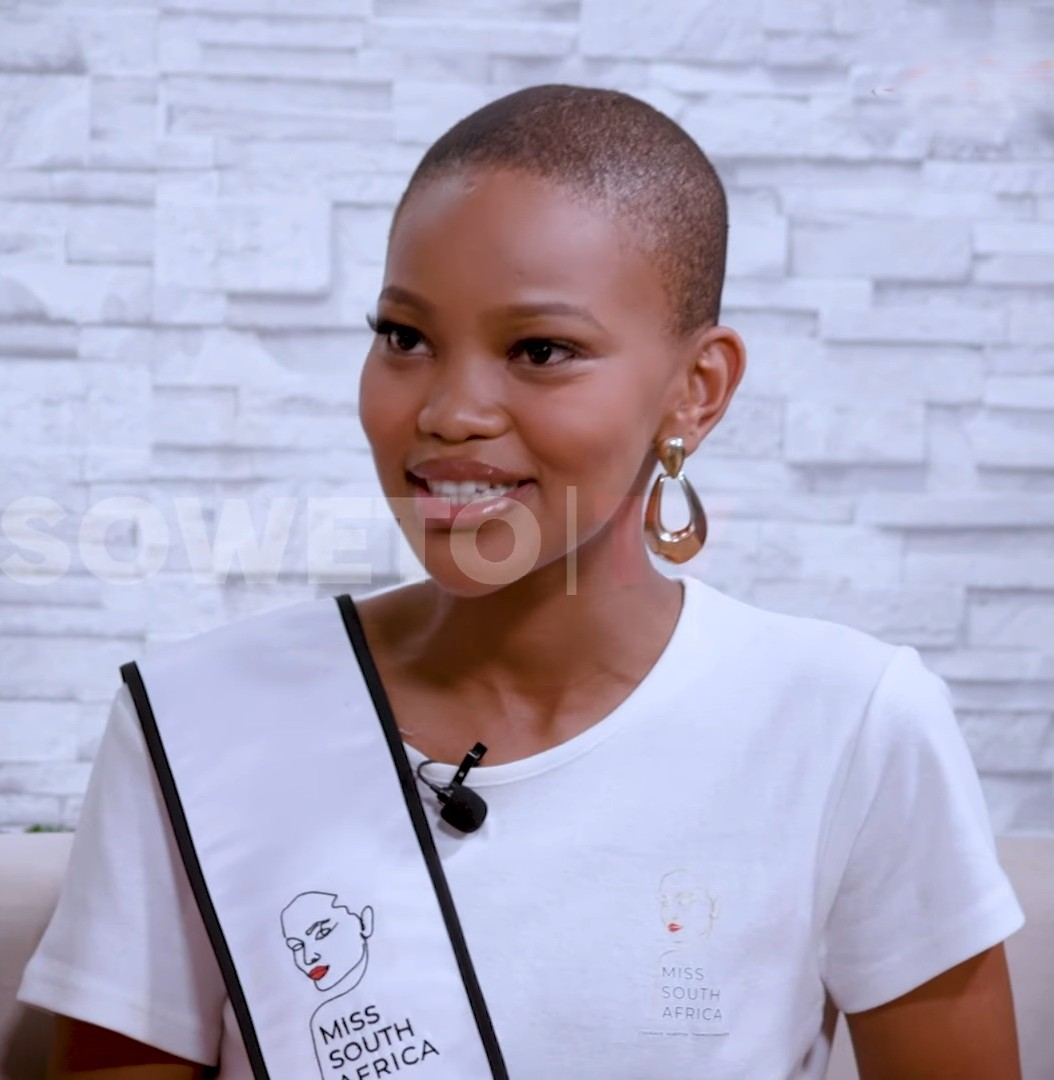
- Qhawekazi Mazaleni, Miss South Africa 2025
- Date: 25 October 2025
- Presenters: Nomalanga Shozi; Pamela Mtanga
- Entertainment: Bucie; Demi Lee Moore; Ciza; Lordkez; Karen Zoid; Xolly Mncwango; Langa Mavuso; Makhadzi
- Venue: SunBet Arena, Time Square, Pretoria
- Broadcaster: SABC 3; Mzansi Magic; Miss South Africa App
- Entrants: 9
- Placements: 5
- Winner: Qhawekazi Mazaleni; Eastern Cape

Miss South Africa 2025 was the 67th edition of the Miss South Africa pageant, held at the SunBet Arena in Pretoria, South Africa, on 25 October 2025. It marked the first edition under Precious Moloi Motsepe's leadership

Mia Ie Roux of Western Cape crowned Qhawekazi Mazaleni of Eastern Cape as her successor at the end of the event.

== Results ==
=== Placements ===
| Position | Contestant |
|---|---|
| Miss South Africa 2025 | Qhawekazi Mazaleni |
| 1st Runner-Up | Luyanda Zuma |
| 2nd Runner-Up | Karabo Mareka |
| Top 5 | Buyisile Mashile; Gizelle Venske |

== Contestants ==
The top 10 finalists were announced on September 16, 2025, and are as follows:

| Delegate | Age | Province | Hometown |
|---|---|---|---|
| Bridgette Jones | 28 | Western Cape | Athlone |
| Buyisile Mashile | 28 | Gauteng | Daveyton |
| Ghee-Ann Rademan | 23 | Western Cape | Northern Suburbs |
| Gizelle Venske | 27 | Gauteng | Vanderbijlpark |
| Karabo Mareka | 28 | Gauteng | Alexandra |
| Luyanda Zuma | 23 | KwaZulu-Natal | Pietermaritzburg |
| Nthabiseng Kgasi | 30 | Gauteng | Soweto |
| Qhawekazi Mazaleni | 24 | Eastern Cape | Gonubie |
| Zanele Phakathi | 27 | Gauteng | Soweto |

== Judges ==
- Tamaryn Green-Nxumalo — Miss South Africa 2018
- Ndavi Nokeri — Miss South Africa 2022
- Cindy Mahlangu — Actress and media personality
- Thebe Ikalafeng — Brand strategist
- Heidi Giokos — Broadcast journalist
