= Rashmita Rasindran =

Malaysian beauty pageant titleholder

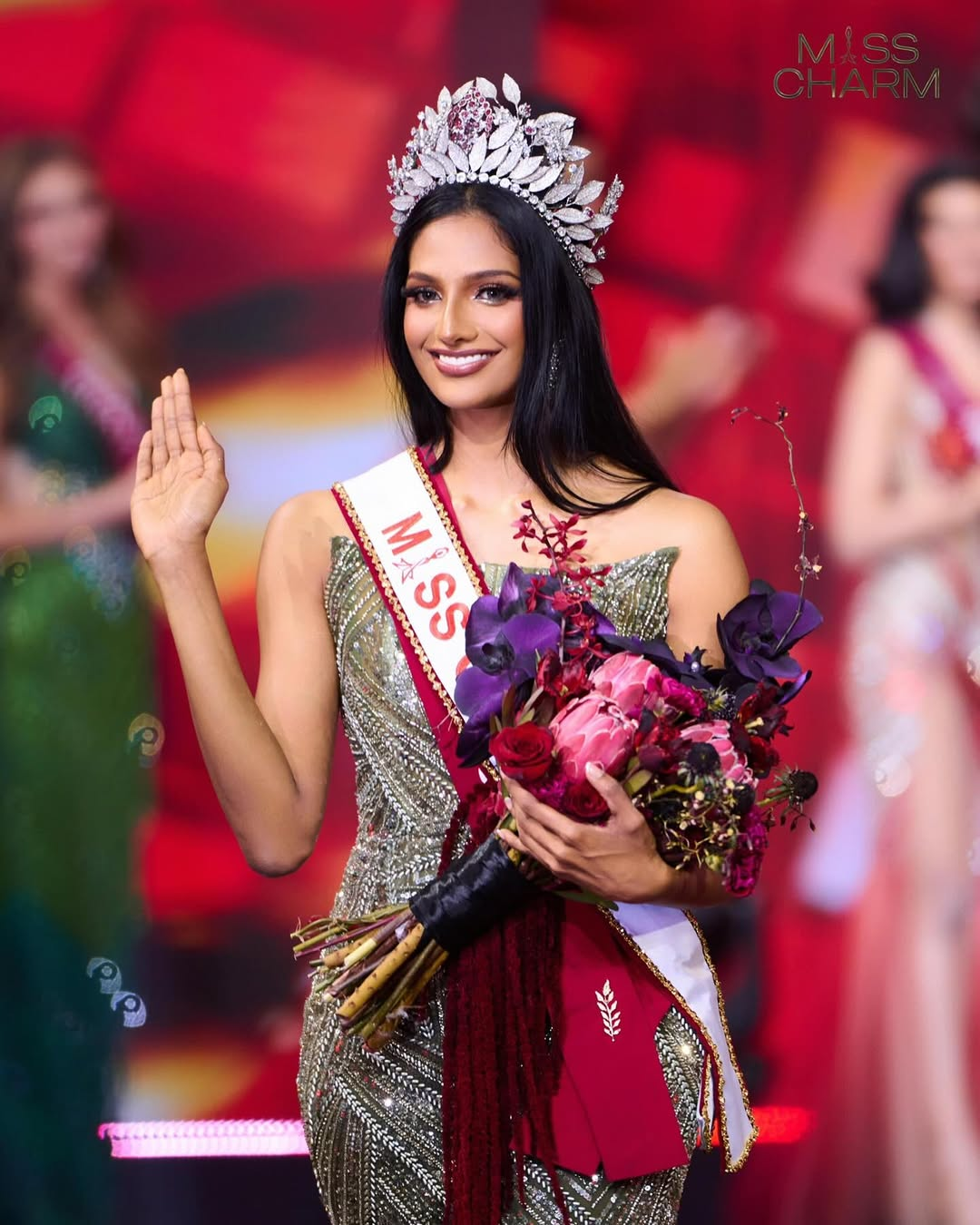
- Rasindran in 2024
- Education: University Malaysia Sarawak
- Height: 1.81 m (5 ft 11 in)
- Beauty pageant titleholder
- Title: Ratu Wanita Malaya 2023; Miss Charm Malaysia 2024; Miss Charm 2024
- Major competitions: Ratu Wanita Malaya 2023 (Winner – Miss Charm Malaysia 2024); Miss Charm 2024 (Winner)

Rashmita Nalini Rasindran (Tamil: ரஷ்மிதா நளினி நாசின்ட்ரன், born 3 February 2000) is a Malaysian model and beauty pageant titleholder. She is the first Malaysian to win Miss Charm 2024.

== Early life ==
Rashmita Rasindran has a degree in English and communications from University Malaysia Sarawak. She is a training program designer, model and social activist.

== Pageantry ==
=== Ratu Wanita Malaya 2023 ===
Rasindran won the title of Puteri Mutiara at the national beauty pageant, Ratu Wanita Malaya 2023, and Miss Charm Malaysia 2024.

=== Miss Charm 2024 ===
Rasindran represented Malaysia and won Miss Charm 2024 on 21 December 2024, at the Nguyen Du Stadium in Ho Chi Minh City, Vietnam. She competed against 36 other contestants and is the first Malaysian woman to win.

Awards and achievements
Preceded by Luma Russo	Miss Charm; 2024	Succeeded by Anna Blanco
Preceded by Shannen Jeevasheni Totten	Miss Charm Malaysia; 2024	Succeeded by Jessrina Kaur
