= Miss Charm 2023 =

1st Miss Charm beauty pageant

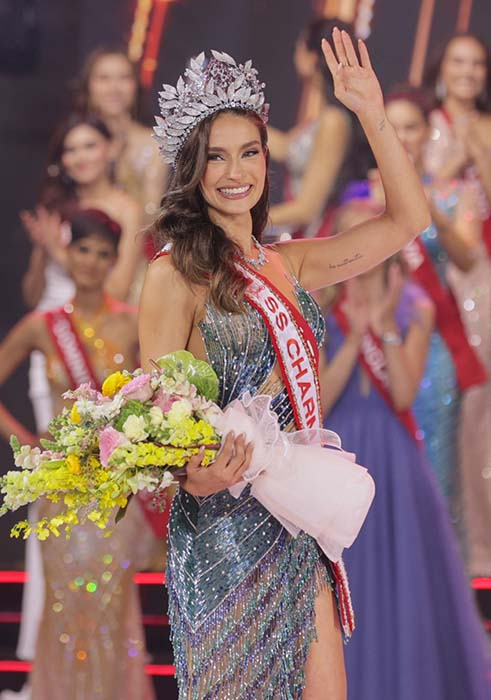
- Luma Russo
- Date: 16 February 2023
- Presenters: Karina Ramos; Phương Mai; Quỳnh Nga
- Entertainment: Phạm Hồng Minh; Thảo Trang
- Venue: Hoa Binh Theater, Ho Chi Minh City, Vietnam
- Broadcaster: VTVcab 4
- Entrants: 38
- Placements: 20
- Debuts: Argentina; Bangladesh; Bolivia; Brazil; Cambodia; Chile; China; Colombia; Costa Rica; Dominican Republic; England; Eritrea; Germany; India; Indonesia; Japan; Malaysia; Mexico; Mongolia; Myanmar; Netherlands; Nicaragua; Pakistan; Philippines; Poland; Portugal; Puerto Rico; Russia; Singapore; South Africa; South Korea; South Sudan; Thailand; Ukraine; Venezuela; Vietnam; Wales; Zambia
- Winner: Luma Russo; Brazil
- Best National Costume: Sotheary By (Cambodia)
- Photogenic: Valentina Campion (Dominican Republic)

External videos
- Final show
- Preliminary competition

Miss Charm 2023 was the inaugural edition Miss Charm pageant, held at the Hoa Binh Theater in Ho Chi Minh City, Vietnam, on 16 February 2023. At the end of the event, Luma Russo of Brazil was crowned the winner.

Contestants from thirty-eight countries and territories participated in the pageant. The event was hosted by Karina Ramos, Phương Mai, and Quỳnh Nga.

== Background ==
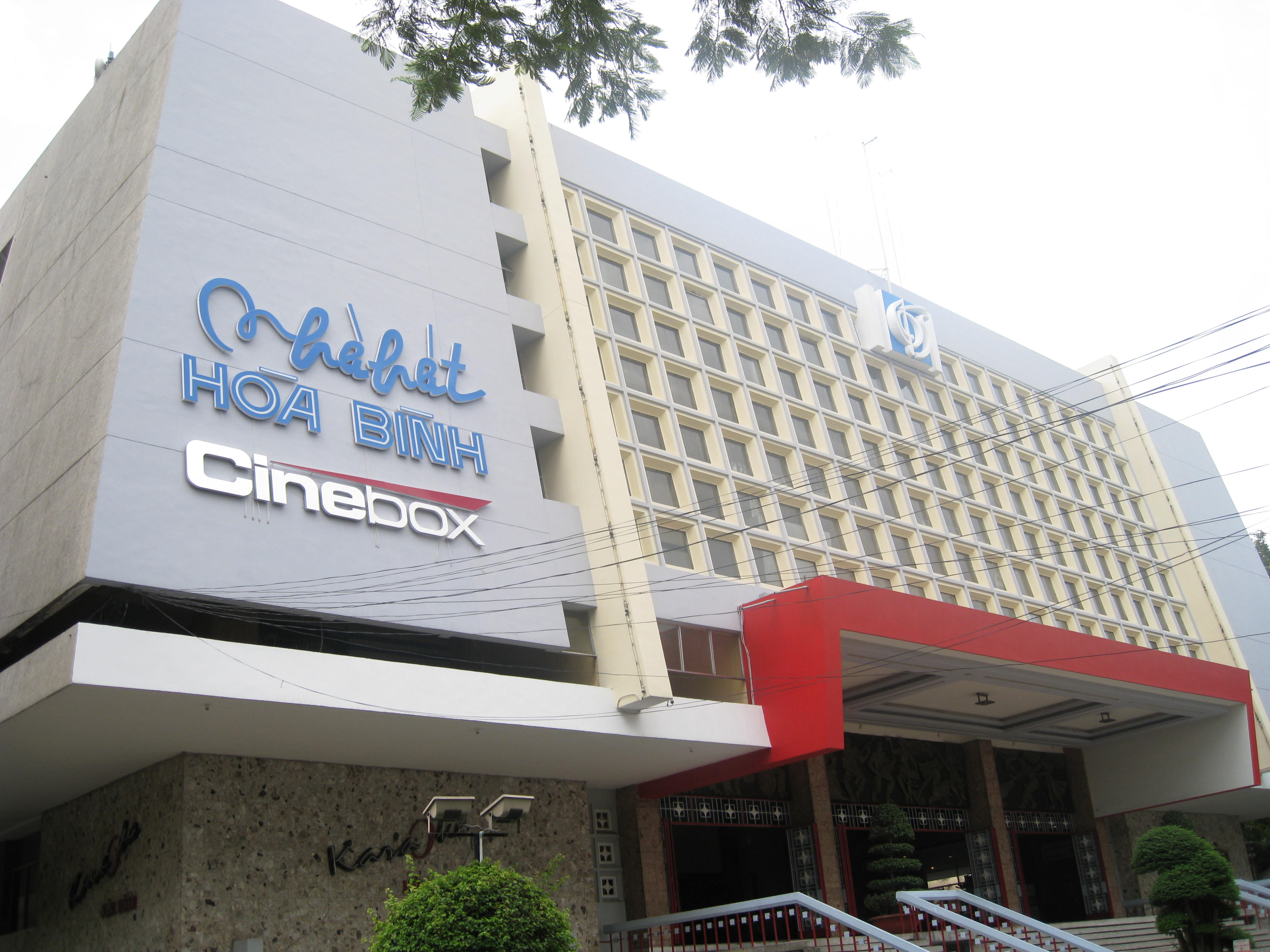
Hoa Binh Theater, the venue of Miss Charm 2023

=== Location and date ===
Miss Charm was officially launched at a press conference on 8 October 2019 under the name Miss Charm International. The inaugural edition was originally scheduled to be held on 17 March 2020 in Ho Chi Minh City, Vietnam. However, on 27 February 2020, it was announced that the event would be postponed due to the COVID-19 pandemic in Vietnam.

On 29 March 2021, the pageant was rescheduled to take place on 1 October 2021. Due to the ongoing COVID-19 pandemic, however, it was later postponed to 24 April 2022 before ultimately being cancelled.

On 17 November 2022, during another press conference held at Lotte Hotel Saigon, the Miss Charm Organization announced that the pageant would be held on 16 February 2023 in Ho Chi Minh City. The Hoa Binh Theater was later announced as the venue for the final coronation night.

== Results ==
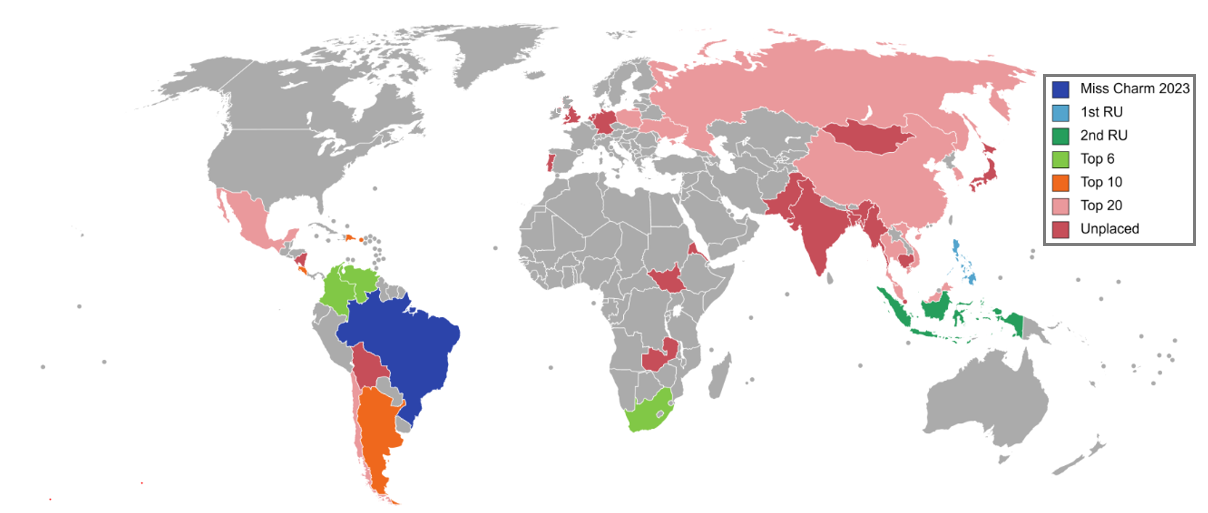
Miss Charm 2023 final results

=== Placements ===
Placement	Contestant
Miss Charm 2023	Brazil – Luma Russo
1st Runner-Up	Philippines – Annabelle McDonnell
2nd Runner-Up	Indonesia – Olivia Tan §
Top 6	Colombia – Juliana Habib; South Africa – Luyanda Zuma; Venezuela – Lady Di Mosquera
Top 10	Argentina – Julieta García; Costa Rica – Andrea Montero; Dominican Republic – Valentina Campion; Puerto Rico – Alejandra Pagán
Top 20	Chile – Anahí Hormazábal; China – Mengli Li; Malaysia – Shannen Totten; Mexico – Karen Bustos; Poland – Sylwia Bober; Russia – Anna Baksheeva; South Korea – Larissa Han; Thailand – Patitta Suntivijj; Ukraine – Anastasiya Panova; Vietnam – Thanh Thanh Huyền Đặng

§ – Placed into the top 6 through Miss Popular Vote

==== Special awards ====
Award	Contestant
Best in Ao Dai	South Sudan – Aluong Bulkoch
Best in Evening Gown	Venezuela – Lady Di Mosquera
Best in Social Media	Thailand – Patitta Suntivijj
Best in Swimsuit	Colombia – Juliana Habib
Best National Costume	Cambodia – Sotheary By
Miss Photogenic	Dominican Republic – Valentina Campion
Miss Popular Vote	Indonesia – Olivia Tan
Miss Tourism	Vietnam – Thanh Thanh Huyền Đặng

== Pageant ==
The pageant was hosted by Karina Ramos, Phương Mai, and Quỳnh Nga.

=== Format ===
Prior to the final competition, the contestants participated in a preliminary competition consisting of closed-door interviews with the judges and a presentation show, during which they competed in the áo dài, national costume, swimwear, and evening gown segments.

The results of the preliminary competition, which included the swimwear and evening gown segments as well as the closed-door interviews, determined the twenty semifinalists. The winner of Miss BlockCharm automatically advanced to the top 10. The top 20 then competed in the swimwear competition, after which the field was narrowed down to 10 contestants. The top 10 subsequently competed in the evening gown competition before being reduced to six finalists.

The top 6 participated in a preliminary question-and-answer round, from which the final three contestants were selected. The final statement segment was reintroduced, after which Miss Charm 2023 and the two runners-up were announced.

=== Selection committee ===
- Ikumi Yoshimatsu – Miss International 2012 from Japan
- Irene Zhao – Singaporean model and influencer
- Mimi Morris – Vietnamese-American businesswoman and philanthropist
- Mireia Lalaguna – Miss World 2015 from Spain
- Natalie Glebova – Miss Universe 2005 from Canada
- Nguyễn Thị Thúy Nga – President of the Miss Charm Organization
- Trần Ngọc Lan Khuê – Supermodel Vietnam 2013, Miss Ao dai Vietnam 2014 and Miss World Vietnam 2015

== Events during the competition ==
=== Swimsuit competition ===
The swimsuit competition, titled "The Spring Beach", was held on 9 February 2023 at Lotte Hotel Saigon and sponsored by Fizen. Juliana Habib of Colombia was awarded the Miss Fizen title.

Placement	Contestant
Winner	Colombia – Juliana Habib
Top 5	Poland – Sylwia Bober; Russia – Anna Baksheeva; Ukraine – Anastasiya Panova; Venezuela – Lady Di Mosquera

=== Miss BlockCharm ===
For the first time in a beauty pageant, online voting was conducted using blockchain technology, with votes purchased through NFTs. Olivia Tan of Indonesia won the Miss BlockCharm award.

Placement	Contestant
Winner	Indonesia – Olivia Tan
Runner-Up	Vietnam – Thanh Thanh Huyền Đặng
Top 10	Bangladesh – Jessia Islam; Chile – Anahí Hormazábal; China – Mengli Li; Dominican Republic – Valentina Campion; England – Paige James; India – Satakshi Bhanot; Japan – Ruri Saji; Mexico – Karen Bustos

== Contestants ==
Thirty-eight contestants competed for the title.

Country/Territory	Contestant	Age (Note: Ages at the time of the pageant)	Hometown	Ref.
Argentina	Julieta García	23	Bahía Blanca	
Bangladesh	Jessia Islam	23	Dhaka	
Bolivia	Alondra Mercado	21	Trinidad	
Brazil	Luma Russo	27	Divinópolis	
Cambodia	Sotheary By	24	Phnom Penh	
Chile	Anahí Hormazábal	25	Santiago	
China	Mengli Li	24	Henan	
Colombia	Juliana Habib	22	Montería	
Costa Rica	Andrea Montero	22	Limón	
Dominican Republic	Valentina Campion	22	Samaná	
England	Paige James	18	Liverpool	
Eritrea	Winta Russom	23	Mendefera	
Germany	Tamila Lambrecht	19	Oebisfelde	
India	Satakshi Bhanot	25	Pune	
Indonesia	Olivia Tan	29	Jakarta	
Japan	Ruri Saji	28	Jōetsu	
Malaysia	Shannen Totten	28	Kuala Lumpur	
Mexico	Karen Bustos	25	San Luis Potosí	
Mongolia	Myagmarnaran Munkhbold	23	Ulaanbaatar	
Myanmar	May Thazin Oo	21	Myitkyina	
Netherlands	Elize de Jong	27	Rijnsburg	
Nicaragua	Isabella Salgado	26	Chinandega	
Pakistan	Roma Michael	27	Lahore	
Philippines	Annabelle McDonnell	22	Naawan	
Poland	Sylwia Bober	24	Warsaw	
Portugal	Andreia Correia	24	Lisbon	
Puerto Rico	Alejandra Pagán	23	Vega Baja	
Russia	Anna Baksheeva	21	Chita	
Singapore	Dewi Cinta	28	Singapore	
South Africa	Luyanda Zuma	21	Pietermaritzburg	
South Korea	Larissa Han	29	Seoul	
South Sudan	Aluong Bulkoch	29	Juba	
Thailand	Patitta Suntivijj	29	Rangsit	
Ukraine	Anastasiya Panova	28	Kryvyi Rih	
Venezuela	Lady Di Mosquera	22	Carora	
Vietnam	Thanh Thanh Huyền Đặng	26	Khánh Hòa	
Wales	Olivia Harris	20	Magor	
Zambia	Grace Mwila	26	Ndola	
