= Qhawekazi Mazaleni =

South African beauty pageant titleholder (born 2001)

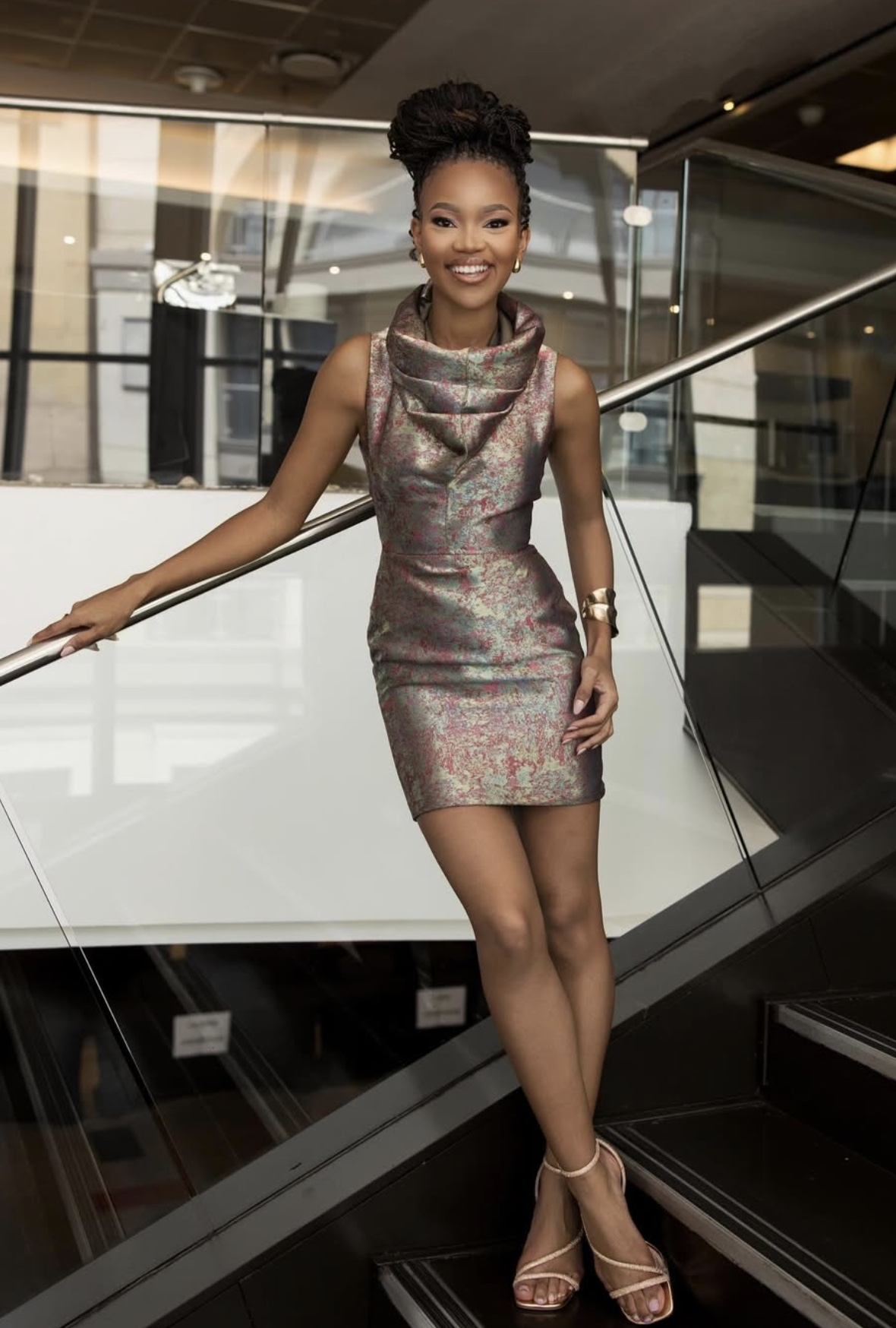
- Mazaleni in 2025
- Born: 11 July 2001 (age 25); Gonubie, KuGompo City, Eastern Cape, South Africa
- Education: Stellenbosch University; University of Pretoria
- Occupations: Education Advocate; Speech-language therapist; Children's Author; Model
- Height: 1.70 m (5 ft 7 in)
- Beauty pageant titleholder
- Title: Miss South Africa 2025
- Major competitions: Miss South Africa 2025; (Winner)

Qhawekazi Mazaleni (born 11 July 2001) is a South African education activist, speech-language therapist, and children's author who was crowned Miss South Africa 2025.

== Life and career ==
Mazaleni was born and raised in Gonubie, a suburb of KuGompo City (fomerly East London) in the Eastern Cape, South Africa. She attended Beaconhurst High School in KuGompo City before completing a Bachelor of Speech-Language and Hearing Therapy at Stellenbosch University in 2023. She subsequently enrolled at the University of Pretoria, where she is pursuing a Master of Arts in Speech-Language Pathology, with her research focused on the knowledge needs of South African caregivers following a diagnosis of autism spectrum disorder.

As a qualified speech-language therapist, Mazaleni has worked clinically with children presenting with a range of communication disorders, including cerebral palsy and autism spectrum disorder. Her clinical work with a young patient who had cerebral palsy and lacked access to isiXhosa-language resources directly inspired her to write and self-publish a children's book, Amasele Amdaka (The Dirty Frogs), in isiXhosa. The book is designed to support early reading and counting skills in a child's home language, and reflects Mazaleni's broader commitment to home-language literacy and inclusive education.

== Pageantry ==
=== Miss South Africa 2025 ===
Mazaleni entered the 67th edition of the Miss South Africa pageant in 2025 and was selected as one of ten finalists. On 25 October 2025, she was crowned Miss South Africa 2025 by her predecessor Mia le Roux at the SunBet Arena in Pretoria. Luyanda Zuma was named first princess and Karabo Mareka second princess. During her winning address, she stated: "To break the cycle of unemployment, we must start by addressing its root causes. When 81 percent of our Grade 4 learners struggle to read for meaning, it shows us that our youth is left behind."

Mazaleni did not compete at Miss Universe 2025. The Miss South Africa Organisation announced that, for the first time, it would focus its titleholder's work exclusively within South Africa during the year of reign, rather than pursuing an international pageant placement.

During her reign, Mazaleni served as an ambassador for the Miss South Africa Organisation's Empower Youth Africa initiative, conducting literacy outreach visits to schools across Johannesburg and the Eastern Cape, including Zenzeleni Primary School in Alexandra, Monde Primary School, and Nkone Maruping Primary School in Soweto, where she read from Amasele Amdaka and led discussions on diversity, inclusion, and mother-tongue learning.

Awards and achievements
Preceded by Mia le Roux	Miss South Africa; 2025	Succeeded by Incumbent
