= Alana Deutsher-Moore =

Australian beauty pageant titleholder

- Born: Alana Deutsher-Moore; Gold Coast, Australia
- Beauty pageant titleholder
- Title: Miss Charm Australia 2024; 1st Runner-up Miss Charm 2024
- Major competitions: Miss Universe Australia 2024 (Top 5/Top10); Miss Charm Australia 2024 (Winner); Miss Charm 2024 (1st Runner-up)

Alana Deutsher-Moore is an Australian beauty pageant titleholder who won Miss Charm Australia 2024. She represented Australia at Miss Charm 2024 and was first runner-up.

== Pageantry ==
=== Miss Charm Australia 2024 ===
Deutsher-Moore won the title of Miss Charm Australia and was the first representative of Australia at Miss Charm 2024 in Vietnam.

=== Miss Charm 2024 ===
Deutsher-Moore represented Australia at Miss Charm 2024 and was first runner-up.

Awards and achievements
Preceded by (Philippines) Annabelle Mae McDonnell	1st Runner-up Miss Charm; 2024	Succeeded by (Germany) Luisa Victoria Malz
Preceded by None	Miss Charm Australia; 2024	Succeeded by Nasia Delis
