= Olivia Tan =

Indonesian beauty pageant winner

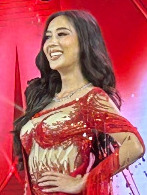
- Born: Olivia Aten; December 3, 1993 (age 32); Pontianak, West Kalimantan, Indonesia
- Beauty pageant titleholder
- Title: Miss Global Indonesia 2020; Miss Charm Indonesia 2023; Miss Charm 2023 (2nd Runner Up)
- Major competitions: Miss Global Indonesia 2020 (Winner); Miss Global 2022 (Top 13); Miss Charm 2023 (2nd Runner Up)

Olivia Tan (born 3 December 1993) is an Indonesian content creator, model and beauty pageant titleholder. She was crowned Miss Global Indonesia 2020 beauty contest and represented Indonesia at Miss Global 2022 held in Bali, Indonesia. In 2022, she participated in the Miss Charm 2023 contest and won the title of second runner-up.

== Pageantry ==
=== Miss Global Indonesia 2020 ===
Olivia participated in the national beauty contest Miss Global Indonesia 2020 held on September 13, 2020, as a representative of DKI Jakarta province. At the end of the contest, she won second runner-up and received the Miss Social Network award.

A few days after the final, Amalia Tambunan from North Sumatra, Miss Global Indonesia 2020 decided to withdraw, Desy Asnawati from West Kalimantan, the 1st runner-up was not ready to replace the winner. The organizers announced that Olivia was crowned Miss Global Indonesia 2020.

=== Miss Global 2022 ===
As Miss Global Indonesia 2020, Olivia had the right to represent Indonesia at the Miss Global 2021 event which was held online in the hosting facility in Bali, Indonesia

The competition was held on June 11, 2022, at the Bali Nusa Dua Convention Center in Bali, Indonesia. At the end of the competition, she entered the Top 13 and won several special awards for Best National Costume and the Media Choice Award.

=== Miss Charm 2023 ===
In 2023, Olivia participated in the first Miss Charm beauty adventure representing Indonesia at her own expense. At the opening ceremony of the Miss Charm beauty contest held on February 17, 2023, in Ho Chi Minh City, Vietnam. At the end of the competition, he achieved the title of 2nd runner-up and won a number of special awards Miss Blockcharm.

Awards and achievements
New title	2nd Runner-up Miss Charm; 2023	Succeeded by (Vietnam) Nguyễn Thị Quỳnh Nga
New title	Miss Charm Indonesia; 2023	Succeeded by Melati Tedja
