= Miss Charm =

International beauty pageant

- Type: International women's beauty pageant
- Parent organization: Miss Charm organisation
- Headquarters: Hồ Chí Minh City, Vietnam
- First edition: 2023
- Most recent edition: 2025
- Current titleholder: Anna Blanco; Venezuela
- Related organizations: Elite Vietnam
- CEO: Trần Ngọc Lan Khuê
- President: Nguyễn Thị Thúy Nga
- Language: English
- Website: misscharm.tv

Miss Charm is an annual international beauty pageant organized by the Vietnam-based Miss Charm Organization with the mission of promoting culture, tourism and educational activities.

Along with Miss Cosmo organized by UniMedia, Miss Charm is one of two international beauty pageants founded by a Vietnamese organisation.

The current Miss Charm is Anna Blanco from Venezuela, who was crowned on 12 December 2025 at BHD Studio, Hồ Chí Minh City, Vietnam.

== History ==
In 2019, Elite Vietnam owned by Thúy Nga, announced Miss Charm International as the first Vietnamese international beauty pageant. The first edition was scheduled to take place around 2019-2020, however, due to the impact of the COVID-19 pandemic, the contest was postponed indefinitely. In 2023, the contest held its first edition.

In 2024, the contest was to be hosted in the United States, however, as many contestants were unable to obtain a US-visa, the contest was moved back to Vietnam.

As of 2025, the contest has been held twice, each with about 40 contestants from different countries and territories.

== Crowns of Miss Charm ==
The official crown of Miss Charm was made by Mexican jewelry designer, Ricardo Patraca, at an estimated cost of US$150,000.The crown is inspired by the bay leaf which is a symbol of victory and glory. The crown stands out in white and red tones, set with more than 6,000 precious stones, symbolizing love, emotion, courage and passion. This crown is also handcrafted from Mexican silver and finished with rhodium. The leaf image on the crown symbolizes the elements of purity, simplicity, freshness and vitality.

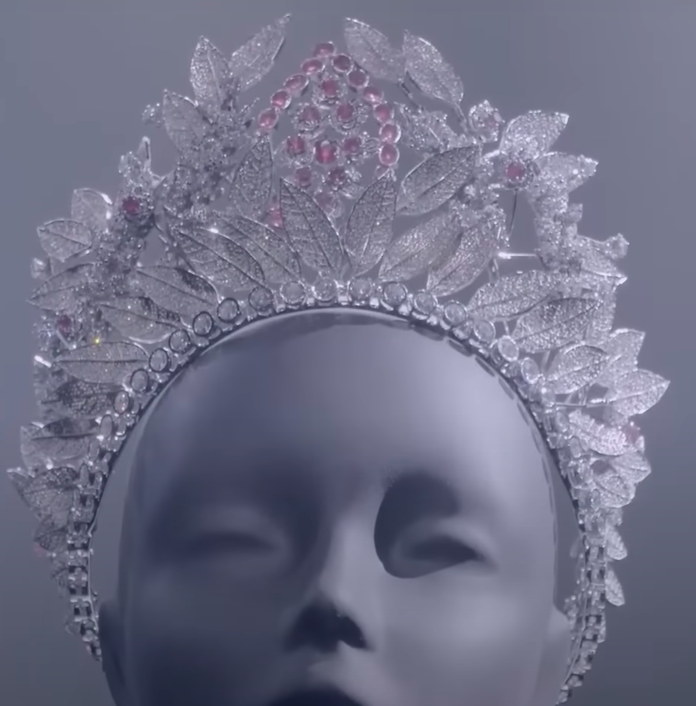
The crown of Miss Charm

== Editions ==
Year	Edition	Date	Venue	Host country	Entrants	Ref.
2023	1st	16 February	Hòa Bình Theater, Hồ Chí Minh City	Vietnam	38	
2024	2nd	21 December	Nguyễn Du Stadium, Hồ Chí Minh City	Vietnam	36	
2025	3rd	12 December	BHD Studio, Hồ Chí Minh City	Vietnam	34	

== Titleholders ==
Year	Miss Charm	Runners-Up		Ref.
Year	Miss Charm	First	Second	Ref.
2023	Luma Russo; Brazil	Annabelle McDonnell; Philippines	Olivia Tan; Indonesia	
2024	Rashmita Rasindran; Malaysia	Alana Deutsher-Moore; Australia	Nguyễn Thị Quỳnh Nga; Vietnam	
2025	Anna Blanco; Venezuela	Luisa Victoria Malz; Germany	Rinanda Maharani; Indonesia	

=== Winners gallery ===
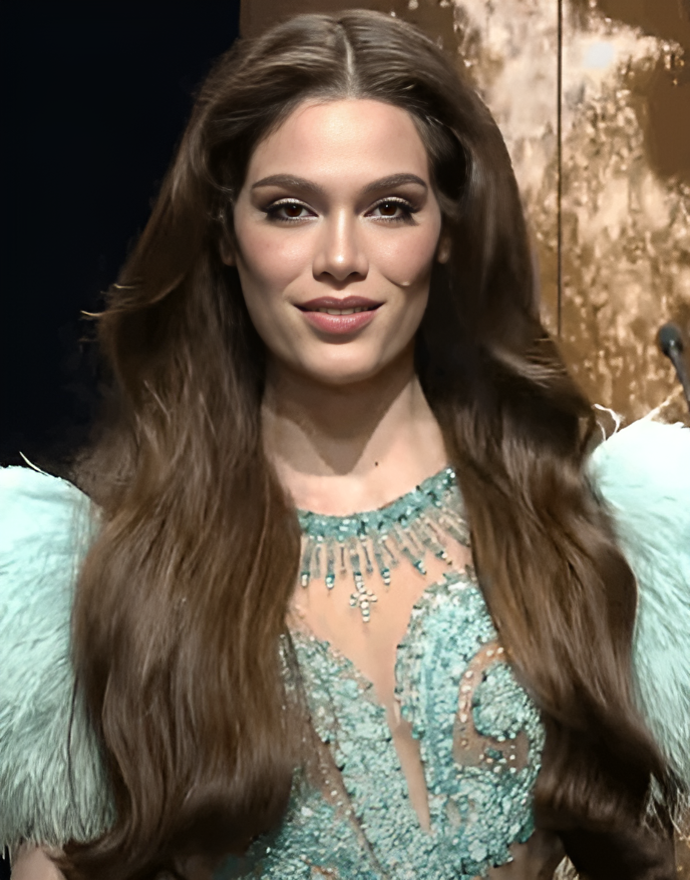
2025 Anna Blanco, Venezuela

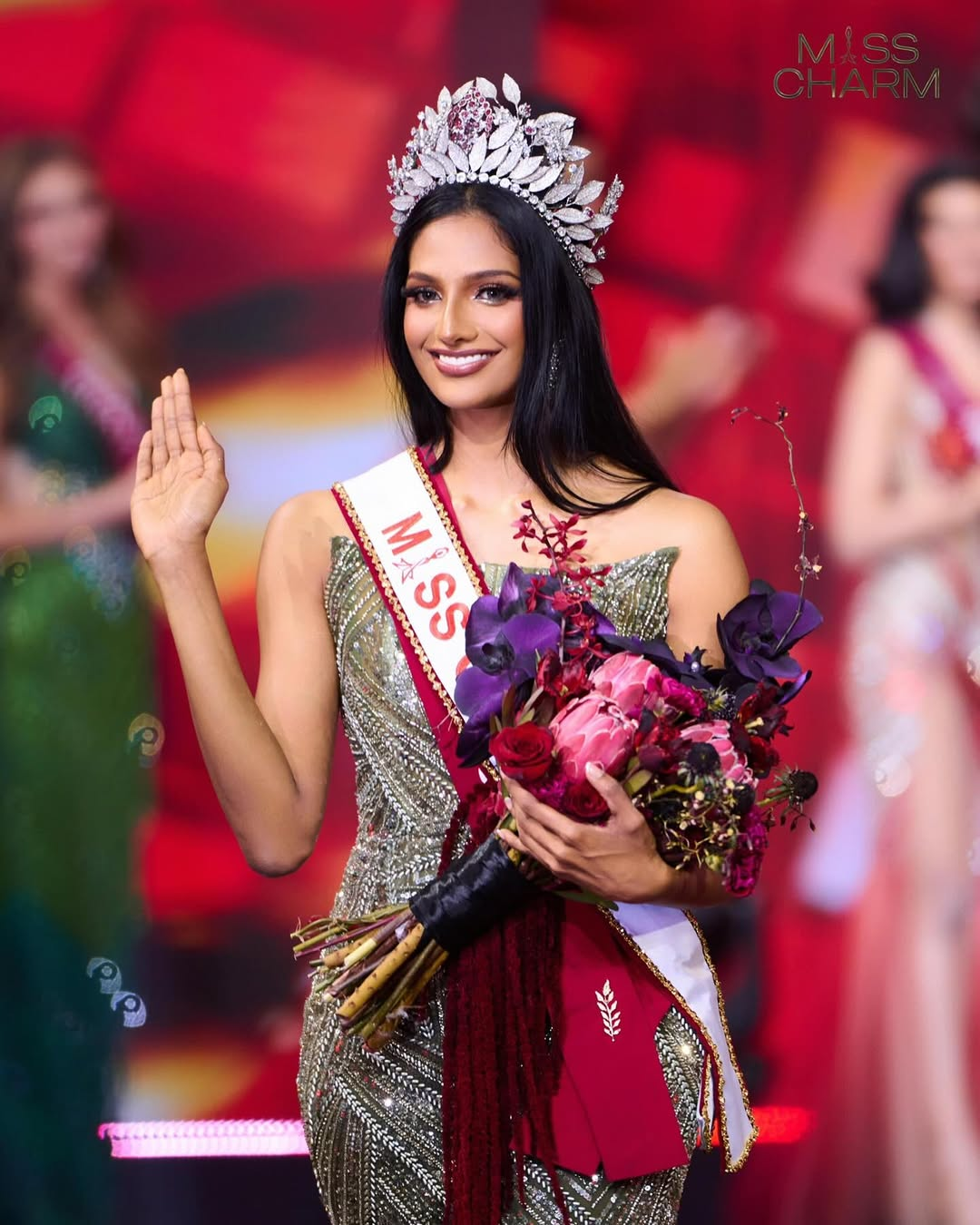
2024 Rashmita Rasindran, Malaysia

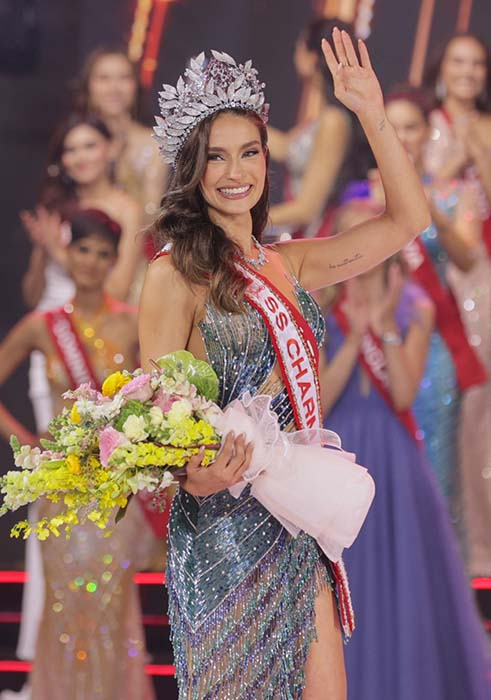
2023 Luma Russo, Brazil

== Participating country finalists ==
Participating	1st	2nd	3rd	#
Albania	—N/a	•	—N/a	2
Argentina	T10	—N/a	—N/a	1
Australia	—N/a		T20	1
Bangladesh	•	—N/a	—N/a	1
Belarus	—N/a	•	—N/a	1
Bolivia	•	•	T12	3
Brazil		•	T12	3
Cambodia	•	—N/a	T20	1
Canada	—N/a	•	—N/a	1
Chile	T20	—N/a	—N/a	1
China	T20	•	T20	2
Colombia	T06	T06	T12	2
Costa Rica	T10	—N/a	T20	1
Dominican Republic	T10	—N/a	—N/a	1
Ecuador	—N/a	T10	—N/a	1
Eritrea	—N/a	T20	—N/a	1
United Kingdom	•	•	—N/a	2
Eritrea	•	—N/a	—N/a	1
France	—N/a	•	—N/a	1
Germany	•	T10		3
India	•	T10	T12	2
Indonesia		T06		3
Italy	—N/a		•	1
Japan	•	•	•	2
Malaysia	T20		T20	2
Mexico	T20	T06	T05	2
Moldova	•	•	T20	2
Montenegro	—N/a	•	—N/a	2
Myanmar	•	—N/a	—N/a	2
Namibia	—N/a	T10	•	2
Netherlands	•	•	T12	1
New Zealand	—N/a	T20	—N/a	2
Nicaragua	•	—N/a	—N/a	1
Nigeria	—N/a	T10	—N/a	1
Pakistan	•	—N/a	—N/a	3
Philippines		T20	T20	3
Poland	T20	•	•	3
Portugal	•	—N/a	•	1
Puerto Rico	T10	T20	T20	3
Romania	—N/a	•	•	3
Russia	T20	T20	—N/a	1
Singapore	•	—N/a	—N/a	2
South Africa	T06	T20	•	1
South Korea	T20	•	—N/a	2
South Sudan	•	—N/a	—N/a	1
Thailand	T20	T20	T05	2
Ukraine	T20	—N/a	•	1
United States	—N/a	T20	T12	1
Venezuela	T06	T20		2
Vietnam	T20		T12	2
Wales	•	—N/a	—N/a	1
Zambia	•	•	•	2

Color keys

- : Declared the winner
- : Finished as 1st runner-up
- : Finished as 2nd runner-up
- T06 : Finished in the top 6
- T10 : Finished in the top 10
- T20 : Finished in the top 20
- • : Unplaced
- – : Not represented

== See also ==
- List of beauty pageants
- Miss Vietnam
