= Luma Russo =

Brazilian beauty pageant titleholder

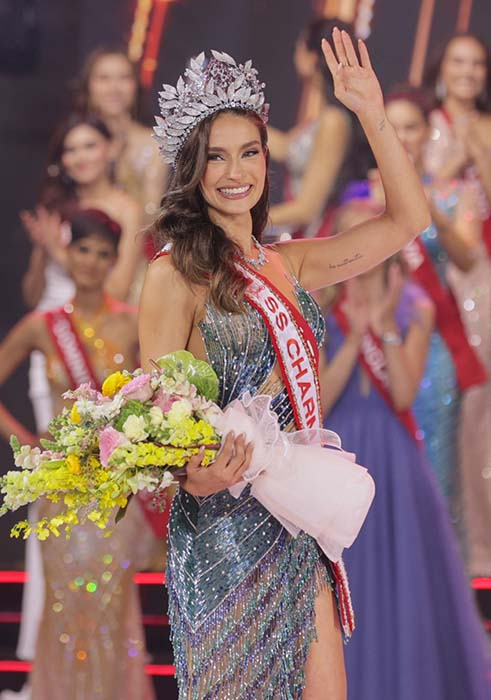
- Russo in 2023
- Born: Luma Russo Moura; Belo Horizonte, Brazil
- Beauty pageant titleholder
- Title: Miss Divinópolis CNB 2019; Miss Supranational Minas Gerais 2020; Miss Charm Brasil 2023; Miss Charm 2023
- Major competitions: Miss Minas Gerais CNB 2020; (2nd Runner-Up); Miss Supranational Brasil 2020; (2nd Runner-Up); Miss Charm 2023; (Winner)

Luma Russo Moura is a Brazilian beauty pageant titleholder who won the first Miss Charm pageant in 2023.

== Personal life ==
Luma Russo Moura was born in Belo Horizonte, Brazil, and raised in Divinópolis. She trained as a commercial airline pilot at Skymates, US and FTA, England. She also trained as a makeup artist at the Brighton Makeup School, England.

== Pageantry ==
=== Miss Minas Gerais CNB 2020 ===
Russo competed at Miss Minas Gerais CNB 2020, representing Divinópolis, where she was second runner-up, and represented Minas Gerais at Miss Supranational Brasil 2020.

=== Miss Supranational Brasil 2020 ===
Russo represented Minas Gerais at Miss Supranational Brasil 2020, where she was the second runner-up.

=== Miss Charm 2023 ===
Russo represented Brazil and won the first Miss Charm pageant, on 16 February 2023 at the Hoa Binh Theater in Ho Chi Minh City, Vietnam.

In the final question and answer portion, the three contestants were asked by Natalie Glebova: "Every morning when you wake up, what do you think is the meaning of life? What are you living for?" Russo answered:

If I have to sum it up in one word: freedom. Freedom, being able to travel where you want to, be who you want, do what you want, be the woman you are meant to be, follow your dreams.... To be able to achieve the knowledge, not only academically but the knowledge of culture, of emotional intelligence, to be able to reach your full potential.

Awards and achievements
First	Miss Charm; 2023	Succeeded by Rashmita Rasindran
Preceded by Ariely Stoczynski (resigned)	Miss Charm Brazil; 2023	Succeeded by Thaíz Jagelski
