= Beirut Souks =

Commercial district located in downtown Beirut, Lebanon

Coordinates: 33°53′56.46″N 35°30′14.28″E

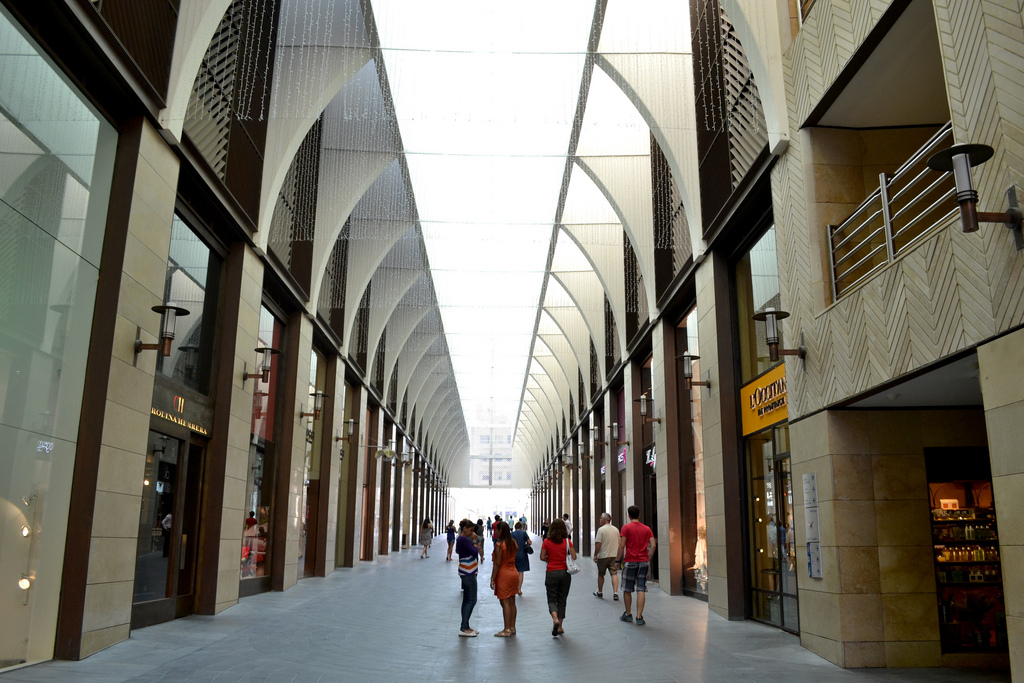
Shopping stores along vaulted alleys inside the Souks

Beirut Souks (Arabic: أسواق بيروت) is a commercial district located in the Beirut Central District. It comprises more than 200 retail outlets, approximately 25 restaurants and cafés, an entertainment center, a 14-screen cinema complex, periodic street markets, and a planned department store. The complex also includes piazzas and other public spaces. Designed through five separate commissions by international and Lebanese architects, Beirut Souks covers approximately 128,000 square metres of built-up area, interspersed with landscaped pedestrian zones.

The souks historically formed the commercial center of Beirut. They sustained extensive damage during the Lebanese Civil War and were subsequently reconstructed by Solidere following the ancient Roman–Greek street grid, while retaining historic landmarks and pre-war street names.

== History ==
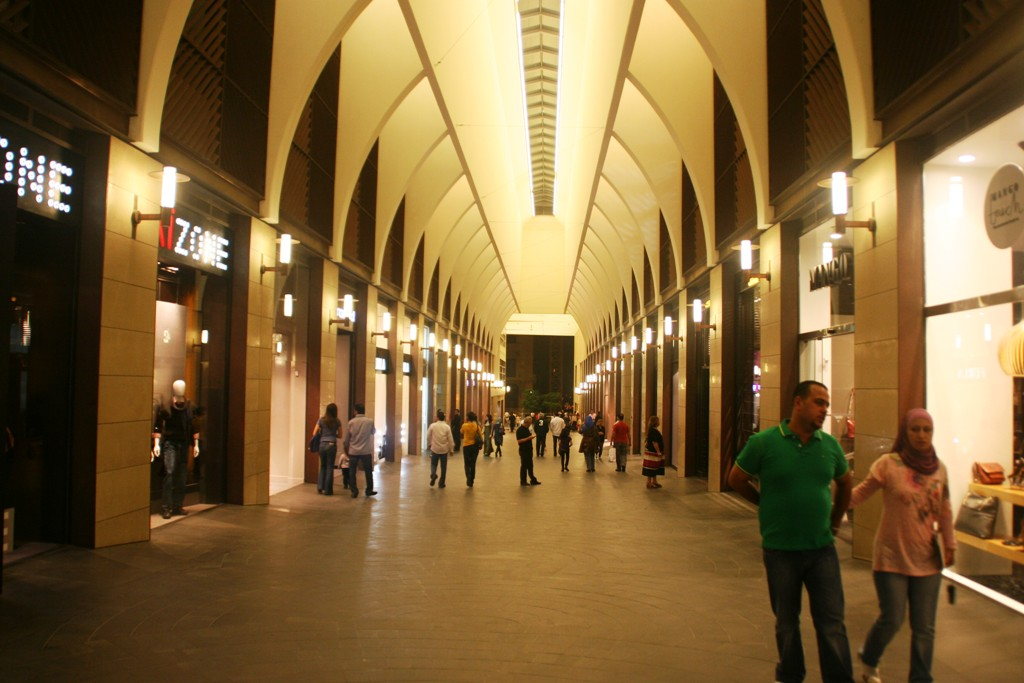
Souk Tawileh

Beirut Souks reconstruction revives aspects of the ancient street network that stems from Roman times....Housing blocks created an orthogonal street plan that survived for centuries and is still present in the alignment of Souk Tawila. The Souks area with its shopping colonnades and villas prospered during Romano-Byzantine times, until the 551 A.D. when the earthquake destroyed it.Solidere

Souk al-Tawileh and Souk al-Jamil were a favorite shopping destination before the civil war and were frequented by Lebanese and Europeans alike since they housed fashionable boutiques and haute-couture houses, while Souk al-Franj functioned as Lebanon's biggest fruit, vegetable and flower market.

=== Destruction ===
During the Lebanese Civil War, Beirut was the scene of fierce battles between warring factions; after a few months of fighting, the brief ceasefire in September 1975 allowed the business owners of Beirut's central district to evacuate their shops' assets before fighting resumed turning downtown Beirut, including its souks into a sniper patrolled no man's land. In October 1975, fighting extended to the souks, gunmen blew up shops and set others on fire. The destruction of the souks affected Christian and Muslim merchants alike. The battle of the souks lasted for 2 and half months until December 1975 before extending to the residential area of Ras Beirut During the spring of 1983, the Antoun Bey Khan, a historic caravanserai and a landmark of the souks was demolished to clear the view towards the sea.

=== Reconstruction ===
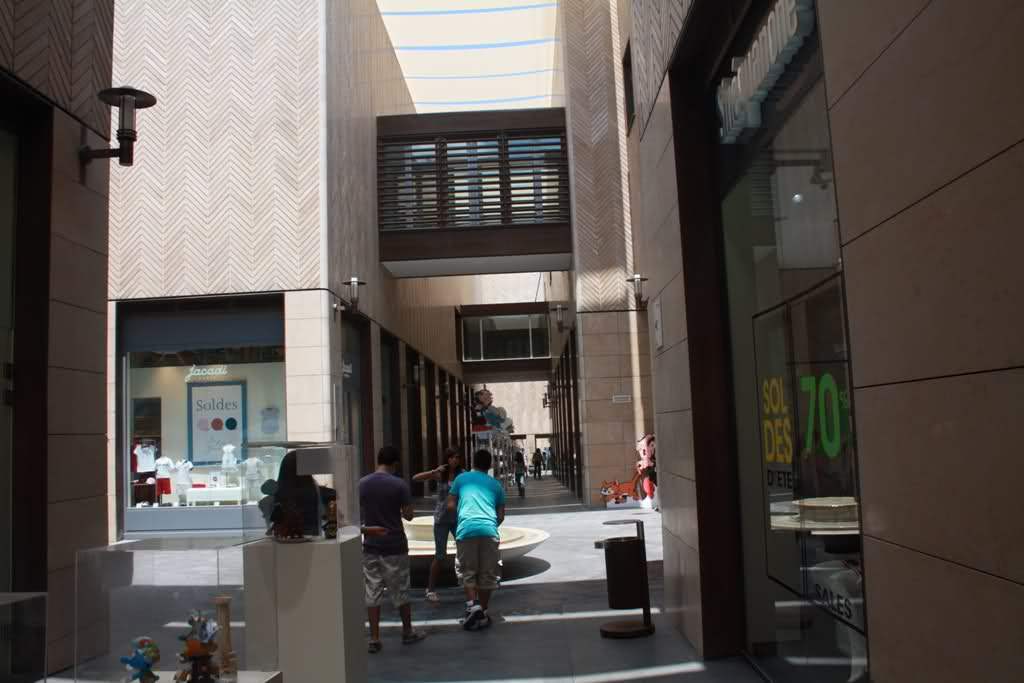
Souk Ayyas

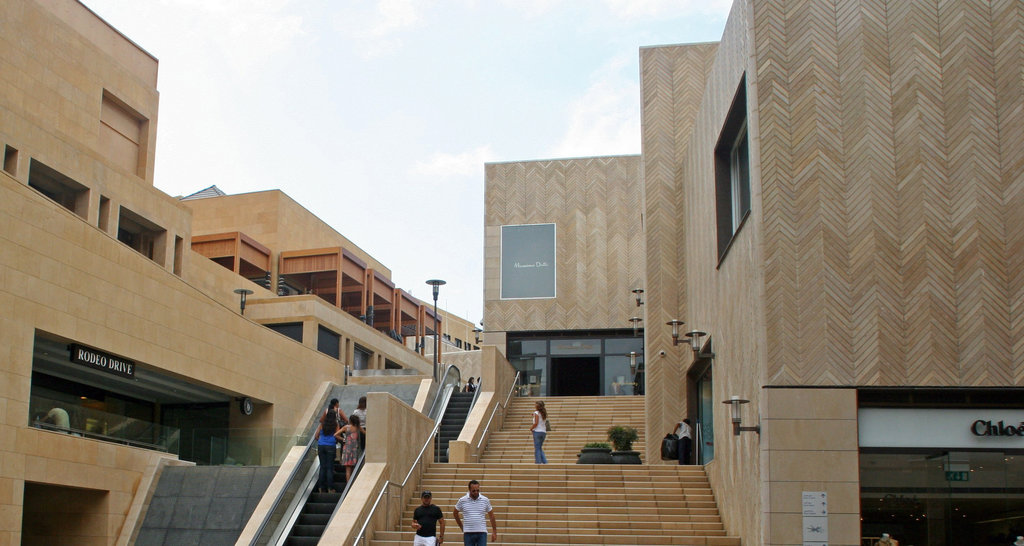
Entrance to Beirut Souks from Fakhry Bey Street

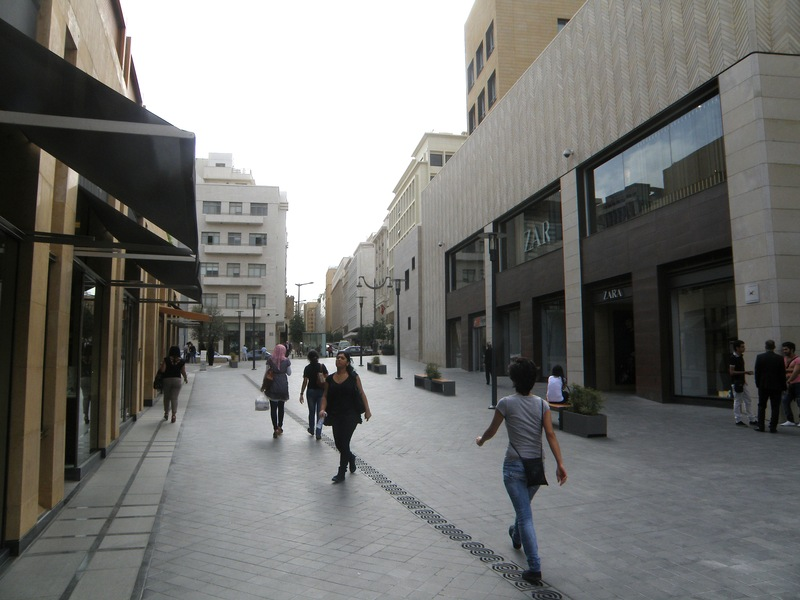
Souk's entrance from Rue Weygand

Reconstruction of Beirut's central district began as soon as the guns fell silent in 1990. Dar Al-Handasah was commissioned by the Lebanese Council for Development and Reconstruction to prepare a master plan for the rebuilding of the dilapidated central district. Henri Eddeh, a senior architect planner at Dar al-Handasah proposed a complete demolition of the historical city center which was to be replaced by modern buildings and infrastructure.

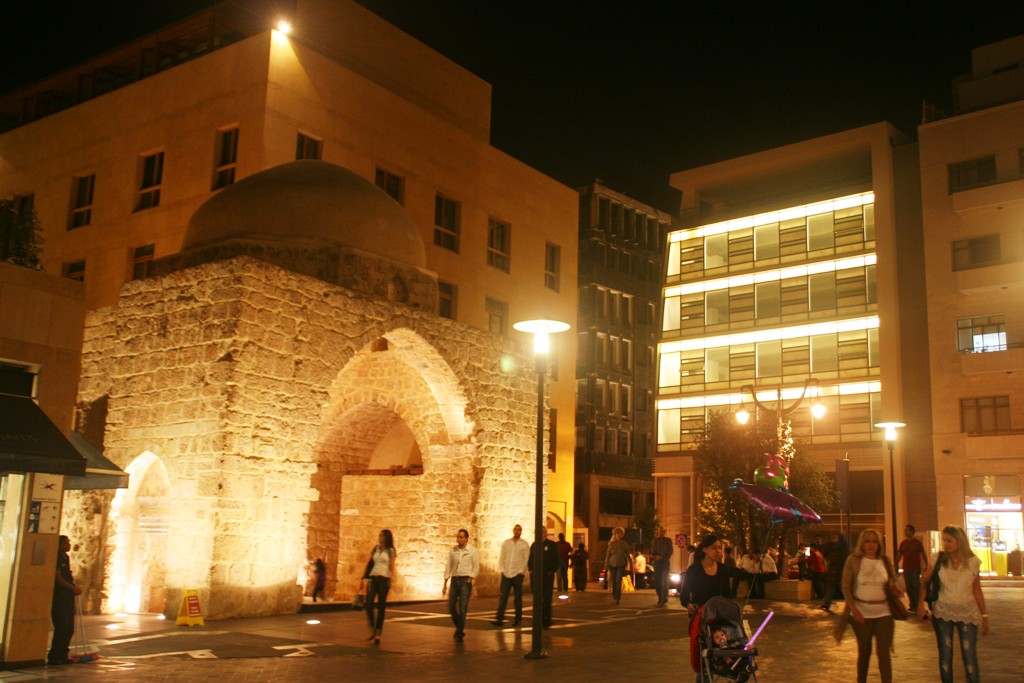
Imam Ouzai Square

The notion of bulldozing the entire cityscape stirred a heated polemic within the intellectual circles and widespread opposition to the master plan led to the adoption of an alternate strategy aiming at preserving and renovating what could be salvaged of Beirut's historic buildings. The new master plan drawn by Lebanese architect Jad Tabet was approved by the Lebanese parliament and its implementation started in September 1994; a private share-holding company (Solidere) was created by the Lebanese government to manage the entire process of reconstruction and rehabilitation of Beirut's central district. Except for specific landmarks that were later salvaged and restored, a large part of the souks' medieval buildings were too damaged to be saved. The void left by the destruction of the Souks left a gap in Beirut's identity, Solidere sought to bring back the souks historic commercial function at the heart of Beirut and appeal to the mercantile community that had fled to the periphery during the 16 year civil war. Solidere launched an international design competition to rebuild the souks while in keeping with the original Hellenistic street grid that characterized the old souks and the area's historical landmarks. The contest was won by Adam Drisin and Evelyn McFarlane.https://www.cca.qc.ca/en/search/details/library/publication/79251523 However, after the competition, José Rafael Moneo Vallés was hired to design a new scheme for the southern souk and British architect Kevin Dash was hired to design the Gold souks. The construction of the souks were entrusted to Lebanese firm Hourie. The master plan for the Beirut Souks was approved by ministerial decrees which preceded the launch of the reconstruction project. Costs of reconstruction were estimated at 100 million dollars and work duration between 18 months and 2 years. The souks was set to open in 2000 but inauguration was postponed due to licensing delays related to political issues; meanwhile the construction of the underground parking was underway. In 2004 Solidere received the license and work on the souks began to be withheld in the aftermath of summer of 2006 war and the subsequent political instability.

=== Opening ===
Beirut Souks were opened to the public on October 2, 2009, after a 10-year delay due to political instability. The Gold Souk's opening was also delayed due to financial disagreements between the syndicate of Expert Goldsmiths and Jewelers in Lebanon and Solidere. Visitors on the opening day wandered through the few opened shops while construction works were still underway.

== Location ==
Beirut Souks are located in Beirut Central District, they are delimited by Mir Majid Arslan Avenue to the North, Rue Weygand street to the south, Patriarch Howayek to the west and Allenby street to the east.

== Architecture and description ==
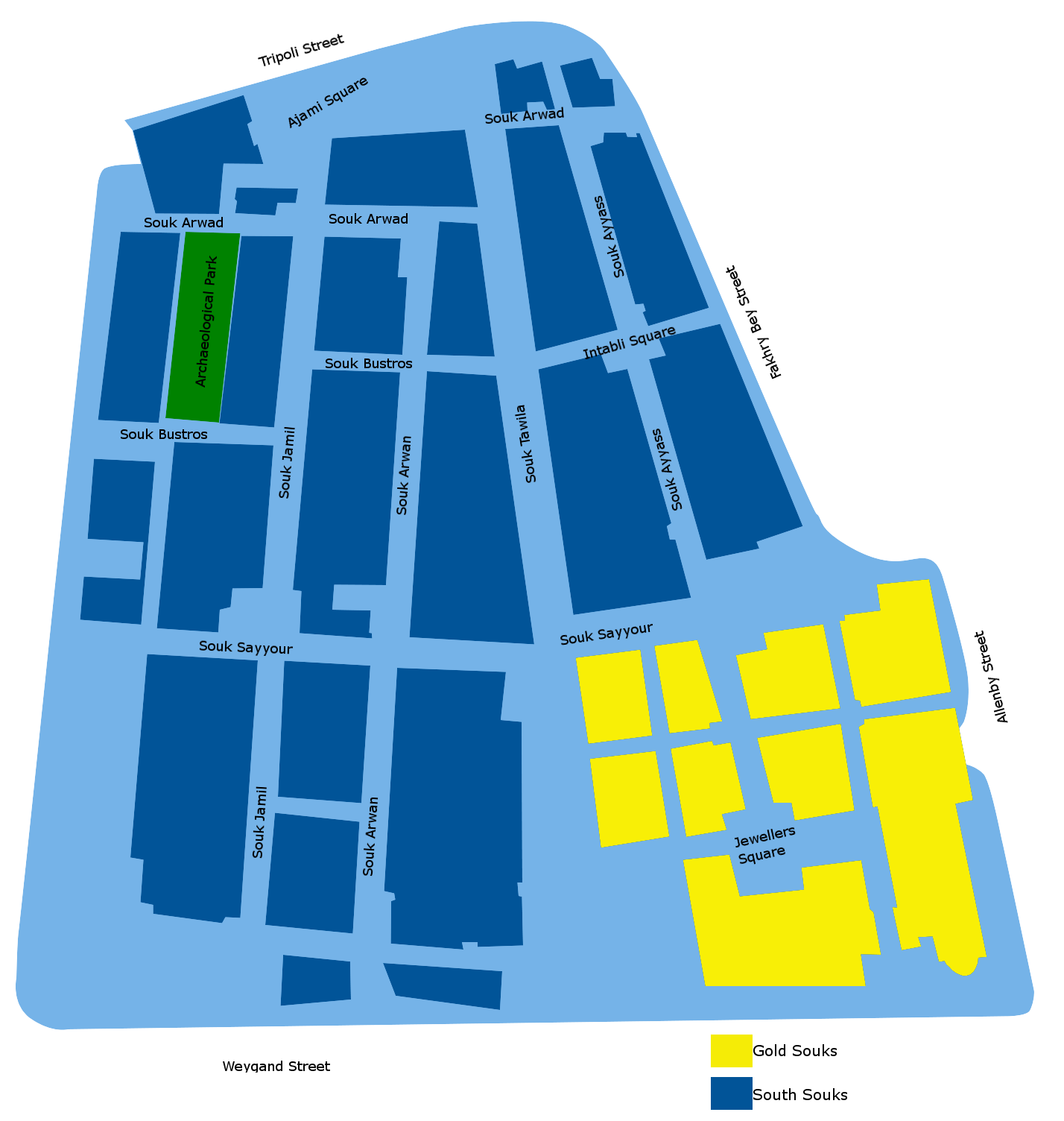
Map of the South Souks showing the Hellenistic street grid

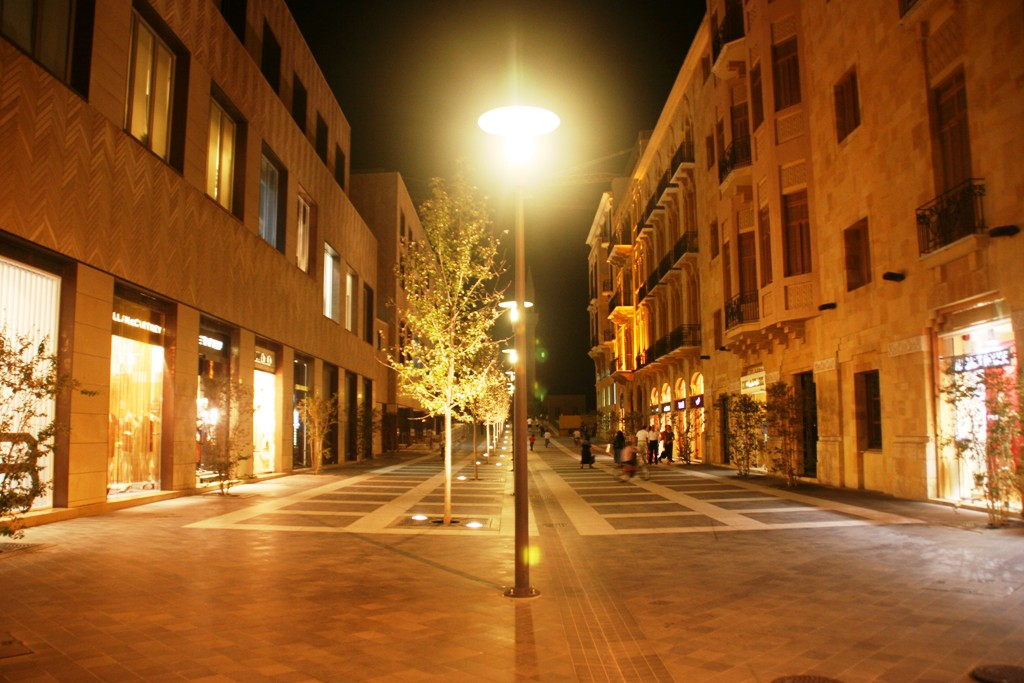
Fakhry Bey Street

The new Souks are a low rise complex of two components: the South Souks and the North Souks. The Souks were designed in five different commissions by international and Lebanese architects. They offer 163,010 square metres (1,754,600 sq ft) of floor space and 17,307 square metres (186,290 sq ft) of pedestrian areas that follow the ancient Greek street grid.

=== South souks ===
The South Souks were designed by Rafael Moneo in collaboration with Samir Khairallah while the Gold Souk was designed by Kevin Dash and his Lebanese counterpart Rafic Khoury. The Souks were designed as interconnected open spaces with many access points; there are 200 shops located along long vaulted shopping alleys and arcades with 49 of these shops located in the Gold Souk. The new Souks have retained their Hellenistic street grid layout as well as their historical names; these are: Souk al Tawila (the long souk), Souk Arwam, Souk Jamil, Souk Ayyass, Souk Sayyour, Souk Bustros and Souk Arwad.

=== Conservation ===
Solidere's plan preserved the heritage left by the different civilizations marking the Beirut Souks' historic location from the Phoenician era until the French mandate. The archaeological findings recovered in the Souks, which have been restored, include the ancient Phoenician commercial quarter, the Medieval moat, the Mameluk Koranic madrassa of Ibn Iraq Al Dimashqi, and the Byzantine mosaics excavated on site.

== Shops ==
Beirut Souks has over 200 shops, including:

- Accessorize
- Adidas
- Antoine
- Aldo
- Anne Klein
- Armani
- Aïzone
- Bershka
- Body Shop
- Bottega Veneta
- Burberry
- Calvin Klein
- Camper
- Carolina Herrera
- Chloé
- Christian Louboutin
- Claire's
- Cole Haan
- Converse
- Cortefiel
- Damiani
- D&G
- Furla
- Geox
- Häagen-Dazs
- H&M
- Hermès
- La cave de Joël Robuchon
- Louis Vuitton
- M.A.C
- Mango
- Mango accessories
- Mexx
- Massimo Dutti
- Nike
- Nine West
- L'Occitane en Provence
- Patchi
- Porsche Design
- Promod
- Pull and Bear
- Puma
- Quiksilver
- Reebok
- Rodeo Drive
- Roxy
- Samsung
- Sony World
- Stella McCartney
- Stradivarius
- Sunglass Hut
- Timberland
- Tommy Hilfiger
- Toy Watch
- Uterqüe
- Vera Wang
- Vero Moda
- Virgin
- Yves Saint Laurent
- Zara

== Awards ==
The Beirut Souks received in 2009 the Capital Issues Award under the category of Architectural excellence. The award was collected on behalf of Solidere by Angus Gavin on December 22, 2009.

== Incidents ==
On 15 September 2020, a fire broke out in a Zaha Hadid building at Beirut Souks, close to the city's port, but was quickly extinguished.

== See also ==
- Avenue des Français
- Bazaar
- Bazaari
- Rue Maarad
- Souq
