= List of Chinese Filipinos =

List of notable Filipinos of part or partial Chinese ancestry

The following is a list of notable Chinese Filipinos (Filipinos of Chinese descent).

- López family of Iloilo, is a wealthy and influential Filipino family of business magnates, media proprietors, politicians, and philanthropists descended from Filipino-Chinese merchant Basílio López (c. 1800–c. 1875).
- Tommy Abuel (born 1942), actor and lawyer
- Tetchie Agbayani (born 1961), movie and television actress and model
- Carlene Aguilar (born 1982), actress, model and beauty queen
- Emilio Aguinaldo (1869–1964), Filipino revolutionary leader and 1st president of the Philippines
- Say Alonzo (born Sheryll Anne Yudatco-Tordillas in 1983), Pinoy Big Brother Season 1 housemate
- Dante Ang (1942-2026), journalist, the chairman emeritus and owner of The Manila Times
- Ramon S. Ang (born 1954), businessman
- Teresita Ang See (born 1949), civic leader and activist
- Angel Aquino (born 1973), actress
- Wen Chen-ling (born 1992), actress based in Mainland China
- Bam Aquino (born 1977), entrepreneur, politician
- Benigno Aquino III (1960–2021), 15th president of the Philippines
- Corazon Aquino (1933–2009), 11th president of the Philippines and mother of Philippine democracy
- Kris Aquino (born 1971), actress, TV host
- John Arcilla (born 1966), actor and environmentalist
- Ruthlane Uy Asmundson (born 1945), politician
- Arnold Atienza (born 1972), politician, TV host and retired athlete
- Kim Atienza (born 1967), television host, weather anchor and former politician
- Lito Atienza (born 1941), politician
- Julius Babao (born 1968), news anchor, news reporter, broadcaster, journalist
- Harlene Bautista (born 1973), actress and businesswoman
- Herbert Bautista (born 1968), actor, comedian and politician
- Gelli de Belen (born 1973), actress and television host
- Janice de Belen (born 1968), actress, commercial model and Television presenter
- Joy Belmonte (born 1970), politician
- Kris Bernal (born 1989), actress, dancer, singer
- Lucio Co (born 1953), co founder of Puregold
- Tony Tan Caktiong (born 1953), businessman and founder, CEO, and president of Jollibee Foods Corporation
- Jose Yao Campos (1921–2006), businessman and founder of Unilab
- Teresita Sy-Coson (born 1950), businesswoman
- Antonio Carpio (born 1949), lawyer and former associate justice of Supreme Court of the Philippines
- Jeffrei Chan (born 1983), basketball player
- Jose Mari Chan (born 1945), singer
- Ben Chan (born 1957), founder of Suyen Corporation, Bench brand; businessman
- Ken Chan (born 1993), actor
- Gab Chee Kee (born 1976), guitarist of Parokya ni Edgar
- Desiree Cheng (born 1996), volleyball player
- Gec Chia (born 1979), retired basketball player
- Joyce Ching (born 1995), actress and model
- Lyn Ching-Pascual (born 1973), TV host of GMA morning show Unang Hirit.
- Kim Chiu (born 1990), Pinoy Big Brother: Teen Edition 1 Big Winner, actress and singer
- Bryan Chong (born 1999), singer and songwriter
- Kriesha Chu (born 1998), singer based in South Korea
- Xiao Chua (born 1984), historian
- Alfrancis Chua (born 1966), retired basketball player and current team manager of Barangay Ginebra San Miguel
- Brent Chua (born 1985), fashion model
- Dino Carlo Chua (born 1980), politician and businessman
- Joel Chua (born 1972), politician
- Justin Chua (born 1989), basketball player
- Karl Chua (born 1978), economist and Socioeconomic Planning Secretary
- Manuel Chua (born 1980), actor and model turned politician
- Tony Chua (1959–2009), retired basketball player and businessman
- Xiao Chua, (born 1984), popular historian
- Dee C. Chuan (1888–1940), businessman
- Dennis Chung (born 2001), footballer
- Michael Cinco, (born 1971), World Class Fashion Designer
- Kean Cipriano (born 1987), actor, singer, composer and model
- Alfredo Co (born 1949), Sinologist and philosopher
- Atoy Co (born 1951), former basketball player turned actor
- Christopher Co (born 1967), politician and businessman
- Renee Co (born 1997), politician, lawyer, and activist
- Zaldy Co (born 1970), politician and businessman
- Eduardo Cojuangco, Jr. (1935–2020), politician and businessman
- Jose Cojuangco, Jr. (born 1934), politician
- Jose Cojuangco, Sr. (1896–1976), politician
- Mark Cojuangco (born 1957), politician
- Mikee Cojuangco-Jaworski (born 1974), equestrienne, model, actress and television host
- Tingting Cojuangco (born 1944), former politician
- David Consunji (1921–2017), businessman
- Nikki Coseteng (born 1952), retired politician
- Tirso Cruz III (born 1952), actor, comedian and singer
- Dakila Cua (1977-2026), politician
- Hanz Cua, fortune teller and astrologer
- Joseph Cua (born 1962), politician
- Sharon Cuneta (born 1966), actress, singer, television host, and socialite
- AJ Dee (born 1982), actor
- Enchong Dee (born 1988), actor, dancer, model and swimmer
- Michelle Dee (born 1995), actress, athlete, model, TV presenter, beauty pageant titleholder
- Damián Domingo, was the father of Philippine painting
- Kisses Delavin (born 1999), Pinoy Big Brother: Lucky 7 2nd Big Placer, model, actress, singer
- Allen Dizon (born 1977), actor
- Charlie Dizon (born 1996), actress
- Mylene Dizon (born 1975), actress
- Rodante Dizon Marcoleta (born 1953), lawyer and politician
- Sunshine Dizon (born 1983), actress
- Vince Dizon (born 1974), economist, consultant, Secretary of Department of Transportation, former secretary of Department of Public Works and Highways, under the Marcos Jr. administration
- Damián Domingo (1796–1834), 19th century painter and headmaster
- Alec Dungo (born 1994), Pinoy Big Brother: Teen Edition 4 housemate
- Mario Dumaual (1959–2023), entertainment reporter and showbiz columnist
- Rodrigo Duterte (born 1945), 16th president of the Philippines
- Benjamin Dy (1952–2013), politician
- Faustino Dy Sr. (1925–1993), politician
- Faustino Dy III (born 1961), politician, Speaker of the House of Representatives
- Faustino Dy V (born 1991), politician
- Jason Dy (born 1990), The Voice of the Philippines Season 2 winner and singer
- Kim Kianna Dy (born 1995), volleyball player
- Luane Dy (born 1986), news anchor, hostactress and model
- Guillermo Eleazar (born 1965), PNP chief (May 8, 2021)
- John Estrada (born 1973), actor and comedian
- Heart Evangelista (born Love Marie Ongpauco in 1985), actress
- Mark Anthony Fernandez (born 1979), actor, model, dancer
- Renz Fernandez (born 1985), actor
- Rudy Fernandez (1952–2008), actor and producer
- Tony Ferrer (1934–2021), actor, film director and producer
- Mr. Fu (born 1978), DJ, host, news reporter
- Gwen Garci (born 1980), former Viva Hot Babes member, host, model and actress
- Jean Garcia (born 1969), actress, model and dancer
- Boboy Garovillo (born 1951), singer, composer, television host, and actor
- Win Gatchalian (born Sherwin Ting Gatchalian in 1974), politician and businessman
- Bong Go (born Christopher Lawrence Go in 1974), senator and former personal aide of President Rodrigo Duterte
- Rachelle Ann Go (born 1986), actress and singer
- Tshomlee Go (born 1981), Taekwondo practitioner
- Betty Go-Belmonte (1933–1994), newspaper publisher
- Eric Go Yap (born 1979), congressman
- Mark Go (born 1952), businessman
- Frederick Go (born 1970), 34rd Secretary Of Finance
- Lance Gokongwei (born 1966), businessman; son of Robinsons Malls co founder John Gokongwei
- John Gokongwei (1926–2019), businessman
- Dick Gordon (born 1945), lawyer and politician
- Alodia Gosiengfiao (born 1988), actress, TV host, model, singer and cosplayer
- Joey Gosiengfiao (1941–2007), film director
- William Jay Grierson (born 1998), professional footballer
- Yeng Guiao (born 1959), retired basketball player, current head coach of the Rain or Shine Elasto Painters and politician
- Marco Gumabao (born 1994), actor, model, athlete, and entrepreneur.
- Michele Gumabao (born 1992), volleyball player and beauty pageant titleholder
- Paolo Gumabao (born 1998), actor and model
- Alice Guo (born 1990), former politician and businesswoman
- Tonton Gutierrez (born 1964), actor
- Katrina Halili (born 1986), actress, commercial model and businesswoman
- Quinito Henson (born 1950), broadcaster
- Rico Hizon (born 1966), broadcast journalist
- Vince Hizon (born 1970),Filipino-American retired professional basketball player
- Gretchen Ho (born 1990), television host, model and former volleyball player
- Rhene Imperial (born Renato Chua in 1950), former actor, former movie producer, born-again Christian minister
- River Joseph (born 1999), actor and entrepreneur
- Angeli Khang (born 2001), actress
- Hayden Kho (born 1980), actor, model, public speaker, cosmetic surgeon and entrepreneur
- Bryan Kong, drummer of Taken by Cars
- Yasmien Kurdi (born 1989), actress, singer
- Ranz Kyle (born 1997), social media influencer, dancer, and former actor
- Panfilo Lacson (born 1948), politician, former PNP chief (1999–2001)
- Raymond Lauchengco, (born 1964), OPM balladeer singer
- Gilbert Lao (born 1978), basketball player
- Jess Lapid Jr. (born 1962), actor, diving instructor, fight director
- Jess Lapid Sr. (1933–1968), actor
- Lito Lapid (born 1955), actor, movie director, politician
- Mark Lapid (born 1980), actor and politician
- Espiridion Laxa (1929-2009), lawyer and film producer
- Maricel Laxa-Pangilinan (born 1970), actress
- Jennifer Lee (born 1983), former Viva Hot Babes member, model, actress
- Mikee Lee (born 1990), Pinoy Big Brother: Teen Edition 1 2nd Big Placer
- Paul Lee (born 1989), basketball player
- Ricky Lee (born 1948), screenwriter, journalist, novelist, and playwright.
- Kier Legaspi (born 1973), actor
- Lito Legaspi (1941–2019), actor
- Zoren Legaspi (born 1972), actor, director, host, film producer
- Joey de Leon (born 1946), comedian, actor, television presenter and songwriter
- Ann Li (born 1995), model, photographer, TV personality
- Ronnie Liang (born 1985), singer
- David Licauco, (born 1995) actor and model
- Alberto Lim (born 1959), businessman and former secretary of Department of Tourism under the second Aquino administration
- Alfredo Lim (1929–2020), politician, former police general of Western Police District (WPD) and former National Bureau of Investigation (NBI) director
- Celine Lim, actress and model
- Danilo Lim (1955–2021), former Filipino military officer and chairman of the MMDA
- Lim Eng Beng (1951–2015), retired basketball player
- Reno Lim (born 1960), politician
- Samboy Lim (1962–2023), retired basketball player
- Xian Lim (born 1989), actor, singer and model
- Henry Lim Bon Liong (c. 1952-2024), businessman
- Janet Lim-Napoles (born 1964), convicted businesswoman
- Limahong (fl. 1574), pirate and warlord
- Vicente Lim (1888–1944) World War II hero
- Mikha Lim (born 2003), member of Pinoy pop group Bini.
- Francisco Alonso Liongson (1896–1965), writer, playwright
- Francisco Tongio Liongson (1869–1919), doctor, politician
- Mona Lisa (1922–2019), former actress
- Ricky Lo (1946–2021), entertainment journalist, entertainment writer, commentator, TV host
- Angel Locsin (born 1985), model, actress
- Liza Lorena (born 1949), actress
- Ed Lingao (born 1976), journalist and newscaster
- Rey Malonzo (born 1952), actor, film director, politician
- Luis Manzano (born 1981), TV host, actor, comedian, VJ, and model
- Tomás Mapúa (1888–1965), architect
- Vinny Marcos (born 1997), socialite, software engineering
- Bongbong Marcos (born 1957), 17th president of the Philippines
- Ferdinand Marcos (1917–1989), 10th president of the Philippines
- Sandro Marcos (born 1997), congressman; son of Bongbong Marcos Jr
- Imee Marcos (born 1955), politician and former actress
- Irene Marcos (born 1960), third child of the late former president Ferdinand Marcos and former first lady Imelda Marcos
- Baldo Marro (1948–2017), actor, screenwriter, stunt director, film director and producer
- Alex Medina (born 1986), actor
- Pen Medina (born 1950), actor
- Ping Medina (born 1983), actor
- Glydel Mercado (born 1975), singer, actress, model and politician
- Mikha of Bini (born 2003), singer and dancer
- Goldwyn Monteverde (born 1971), basketball coach
- Lily Monteverde (1938–2024), movie producer of Regal Entertainment, hotelier and businesswoman
- Marcelo Nubla (1898–1985), legal practitioner and banker
- Diether Ocampo (born 1973), actor and model
- Dominic Ochoa (born 1974), actor
- Paquito Ochoa Jr. (born 1960), lawyer
- Isabel Oli (born 1981), model, actress
- Angelia Ong (born 1990), beauty queen
- Cassandra Ong (born 2000), former businesswoman
- Daryl Ong (born 1987), singer
- Doc Willie Ong (born 1963), family medicine; politician, cardiologist and medical advisor
- Roberto Ongpin (1937–2023), businesseman, former Minister of Commerce and Industry
- Sergio Osmeña (1878–1961), 4th president of the Philippines
- Rommel Padilla (born 1965), actor, businessman, politician
- Bernard Palanca (born 1976), host, actor, product endorser
- Carlos Palanca Sr. (1869-1950), businessman, philanthropist
- Miko Palanca (1978–2019), actor and model
- Donny Pangilinan (born 1998), actor, model, singer, host and VJ
- Bodjie Pascua (born 1955), film and tv actor
- Lito Pimentel (born 1963), film and television actor
- Champ Lui Pio (born 1982), singer
- Chino Lui Pio (born 1986), model, VJ and host
- Richard Poon (born 1973), singer, enabler
- Mariano Que (1921–2017), chinese filipino decent businessman and the founder of the pharmacy chain Mercury Drug in the Philippines.
- Miriam Quiambao (born 1975), model, actress, host
- Miro Quimbo (born 1969), politician
- Stella Quimbo (born 1969), politician and academic professor
- Epy Quizon (born 1973), actor, comedian and television host
- Eric Quizon (born 1967), actor, director, producer, writer and comedian
- Rodolfo "Dolphy" Vera Quizon Sr., (1928-2012), comedian, singer and actor
- Vandolph Quizon (born 1984), actor, comedian and politician.
- Ramon "Bong" Revilla, Jr. (born 1966), actor, movie producer, movie and television director and politician
- Ramon "Jolo" Revilla III. (born 1988), actor, politician
- Willie Revillame (born 1961), television host, comedian, drummer, singer, songwriter, actor, and businessman
- Efren Reyes Jr. (born 1959), actor and director
- Efren Reyes, Sr. (1924–1968), actor and director
- Isabel Rivas (born 1958), actress and businesswoman
- José Rizal (1861–1896), Filipino national hero
- Jesse Robredo (1958-2012), politician
- Raul Roco (1941–2005), politician
- Dennis Roldan (born 1956), retired basketball player, actor, businessman, politician
- Wilbert Ross (born 1997 as Wilbert Marcelo Rosalyn), actor, singer and dancer whose. His grandfather is an Indonesian of Chinese descent who migrated to Davao, Philippines.
- Lorenzo Ruiz (1600 - 1637), first Filipino saint
- Randy Santiago (born 1960), actor, comedian, television host, singer, songwriter, producer, director and entrepreneur
- Raymart Santiago (born 1973), television host, actor and comedian
- Rowell Santiago (born 1963), actor, director, producer
- Rufino Santos (1908-1973), former Archbishop of Manila and first Filipino Cardinal
- Vilma Santos-Recto (born 1953), actress, singer, dancer, TV host, producer, and politician
- Romnick Sarmenta (born 1972), actor and businessman
- Beatriz Saw (born 1985), Pinoy Big Brother Season 2 Big Winner and actress
- Saweetie (born Diamonte Quiava Valentin Harper in 1993), American rapper, singer and songwriter
- Homer Se (born 1977), retired basketball player
- Jennifer Sevilla (born 1974), actress, model, businesswoman, entrepreneur
- Edgar Sia (born 1977), businessman; co founder of Mang Inasal
- Domingo Siazon Jr. (1939-2016), former Ambassador to Japan and former Secretary of Department of Foreign Affairs under the Ramos administration.
- Victor Silayan (born 1992), actor and model
- Jaime Sin (1928-2005), former Archbishop of Manila and leader of the People Power Revolution of 1986
- Jose Maria Sison (born 1939), founder of Communist Party of the Philippines and National Democratic Front Philippines
- Wesley So (born 1993), chess grandmaster and 8th youngest chess grandmaster in history
- Jessica Soho (born 1964), journalist and host
- Vicente Yap Sotto (1877-1950), politician
- Vicente Sotto III (born 1948), actor, comedian, host, singer and politician
- Vic Sotto (born 1954), actor, comedian, host, singer and endorser
- Vico Sotto (born 1989), politician
- Jesus Manuel Suntay (born 1970), politician and lawyer
- Angel Sy (born 2000), child actress, model and singer
- Henry Sy (1924-2019), businessman
- Teresita Sy-Coson (born 1950), businesswoman
- Albino SyCip (1887-1978), lawyer and banker
- Washington SyCip (1921-2017), accountant
- Anthony Taberna (born 1975), newscaster
- Luis Antonio Tagle (born 1957), former Archbishop of Manila and former Bishop of Imus
- Abdusakur Mahail Tan (born 1950), politician
- Andrew Tan (born 1952), businessman person
- Nestor Tan (born 1958), businessman person
- Angelina Tan (born 1971), politician
- Reynolds Michael T. Tan (born 1988), congressman
- Jhoana Marie Tan (born 1993), actress
- Keith Micah Tan (born 1995), politician
- Bong Tan (1966–2019), also known as Bong Tan, was a Filipino business executive and basketball coach. He was the son of Filipino-Chinese multimillionaire Lucio Tan
- Lucio Tan (born 1934), businessman, philanthropist
- Mike Tan (born 1986), StarStruck Season 2 Ultimate Survivor, actor and model
- Milagrosa Tan (1958-2019), politician
- Muedzul Lail Tan Kiram (born 1966), head of the Royal house of Sulu
- Tyrone Tang (born 1984), basketball player
- Siot Tanquingcen (born 1972), retired basketball player and former team manager of San Miguel Beermen
- Al Tantay (born 1956), film actor, comedian, director and writer
- Trinidad Tecson (1848-1928), revolutionist
- Alvin Teng (born 1965), retired basketball player
- Jeric Teng (born 1991), basketball player
- Jeron Teng (born 1994), basketball player
- Amando Tetangco Jr. (born 1952), banker and former governor of Bangko Sentral ng Pilipinas
- Juami Tiongson (born 1991), basketball player
- Jeremiah Tiangco (born 1997), singer, entrepreneur, and actor
- John Rey Tiangco (born 1972), politician
- Mel Tiangco (born 1955), news anchor and TV host of drama anthology Magpakailanman
- Toby Tiangco (born 1967), politician and businessman
- Chris Tiu (born 1985), basketball player, TV host
- JC Tiuseco (born 1985), basketball player, actor, model and 1st Pinoy Sole Survivor, Survivor Philippines
- Alex To (born Alejandro Delfino on 10 February 1962) is a Hong Kong and Taiwan based singer and actor.
- Wilbert Tolentino (born 1975), entrepreneur, restaurateur, philanthropist and a vlogger
- Lorna Tolentino (born 1961), actress, model, film producer and television personality
- Dennis Trillo (born 1981), actor, model and singer
- Jocelyn Tulfo (born 1961), politician
- Jong Uichico (born 1962), retired basketball player
- Alfonso A. Uy, businessman person
- Dennis Anthony Uy (born 1973), businessman person and founder of Converge ICT
- Ivan John Uy, lawyer and secretary of the Department of Information and Communications Technology under the second Marcos administration
- Dennis Uy (born 1975), business magnate, diplomat
- De Carlo Uy (born. 1985), politician
- John James Uy (born 1987), actor and model
- Nicole Uysiuseng (born 1990), Pinoy Big Brother: Teen Edition Plus 3rd Big Placer
- Wilfred Steven Uytengsu (born 1961), businessman and team owner of Alaska Aces
- Alwyn Uytingco (born 1987), actor
- Michael V (born 1969), actor, comedian and recording artist
- Vic Vargas (1939-2003), actor
- Joel Villanueva (born 1975), politician
- Gardo Versoza (born 1969), actor and comedian
- Roi Vinzon (born 1953), action star, film and television actor and film director
- Wenceslao Vinzons (1910-1942), politician and patriot
- Agatha Wong (born 1998), wushu champion
- Manuel Yan (1920-2008), retired World War II veteran, former Chief of Staff of the Armed Forces of the Philippines under the first Marcos administration and former cabinet member of the first Aquino, Ramos and Estrada administrations
- Rico Yan (1975-2002), actor and TV host
- Luis Yangco (1841-1907), was Filipino-Chinese entrepreneur and shipping magnate, known as the "King of Manila Bay and Pasig River" for his control of the shipping industry in the two bodies of water. He was also a financier of the La Liga Filipina, the Katipunan, and the Aguinaldo Revolutionary Government
- Cathy Yap-Yang (born 1971), business journalist, talk host, news anchor, reporter, newscaster
- Alfredo Yao (born 1943), businessman
- Tany Yao (born 1971), paramedic, firefighter
- Arthur Yap (born 1965), politician
- Bimby Yap (born 2007), child actor and model
- Emilio Yap (1925-2014), tycoon and philanthropist, chairman of the Manila Bulletin
- James Yap (born 1982), basketball player
- Richard Yap (born 1967), businessman and actor
- Susan Yap (born 1964), politician
- Tim Yap (born 1977), host, writer and businessman
- Victor Yap (born 1966), politician
- Ye Fei (1914-1999), Chinese Communist general
- Mark Yee (born 1982), basketball player
- Richard Yee (born 1977), retired basketball player
- Mariano Yenko, former commissioner of the Philippine Basketball Association, colonel
- Joseph Yeo (born 1983), basketball player
- Slater Young (born 1987), Pinoy Big Brother: Unlimited Big Winner, civil engineer, and former actor
- Dustin Yu (born 2001), actor and businessman
- Tan Yu (1927-2002), businessman
- Alfonso Yuchengco (1923-2017), businessman and diplomat.
- Carlos Yulo (born 2000), artistic gymnast
- Eldrew Yulo (born 2008), artistic gymnast
- Jose Yulo (1894-1976), cabinet member under Quezon and the first Marcos administrations
- Yael Yuzon (born 1983), musician
