= Rue Weygand =

Street in Beirut, Lebanon

- Interactive map of Rue Weygand
- Native name: شارع ويغان (Arabic)

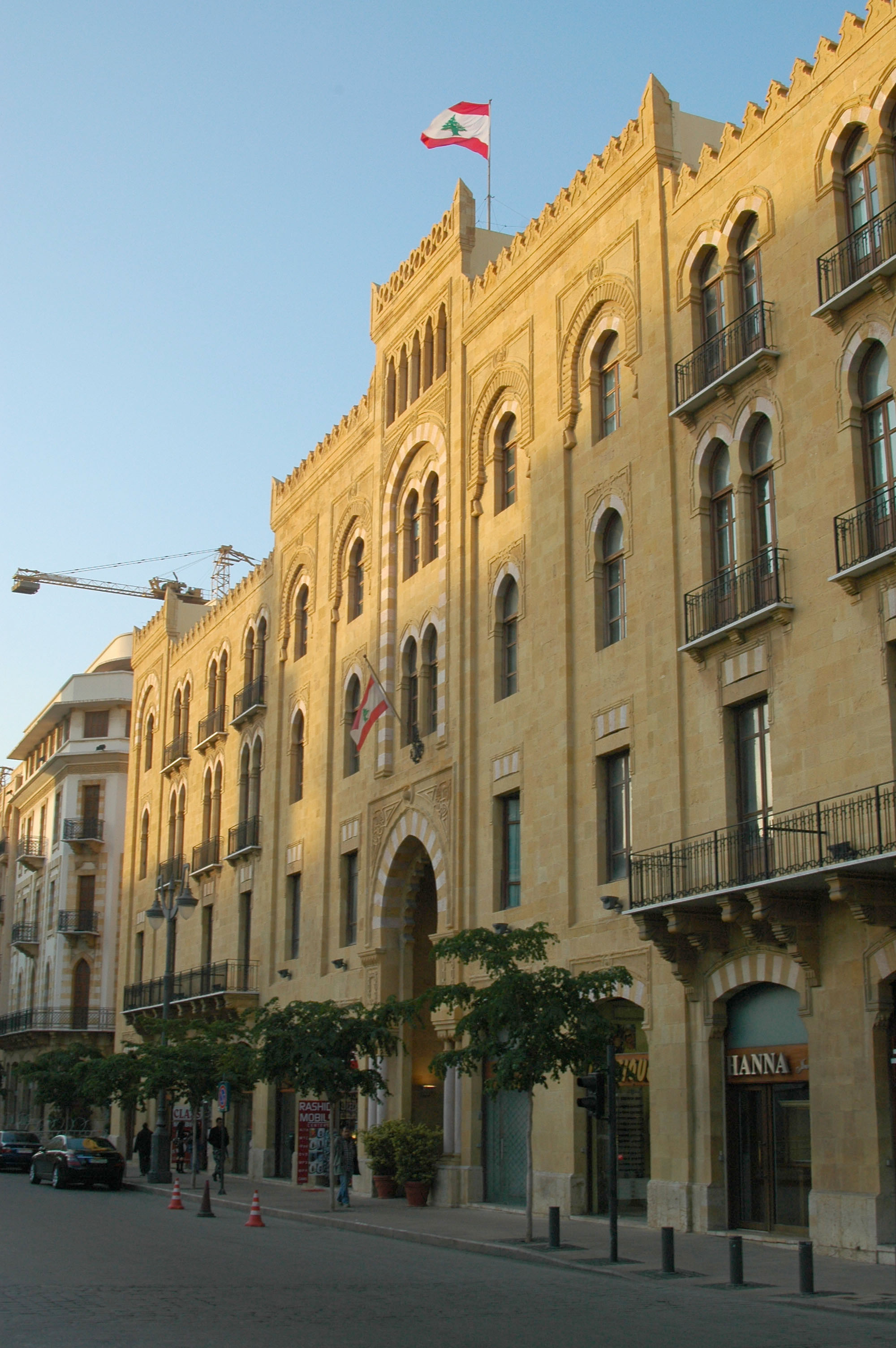
The Beirut city hall on Weygand Street

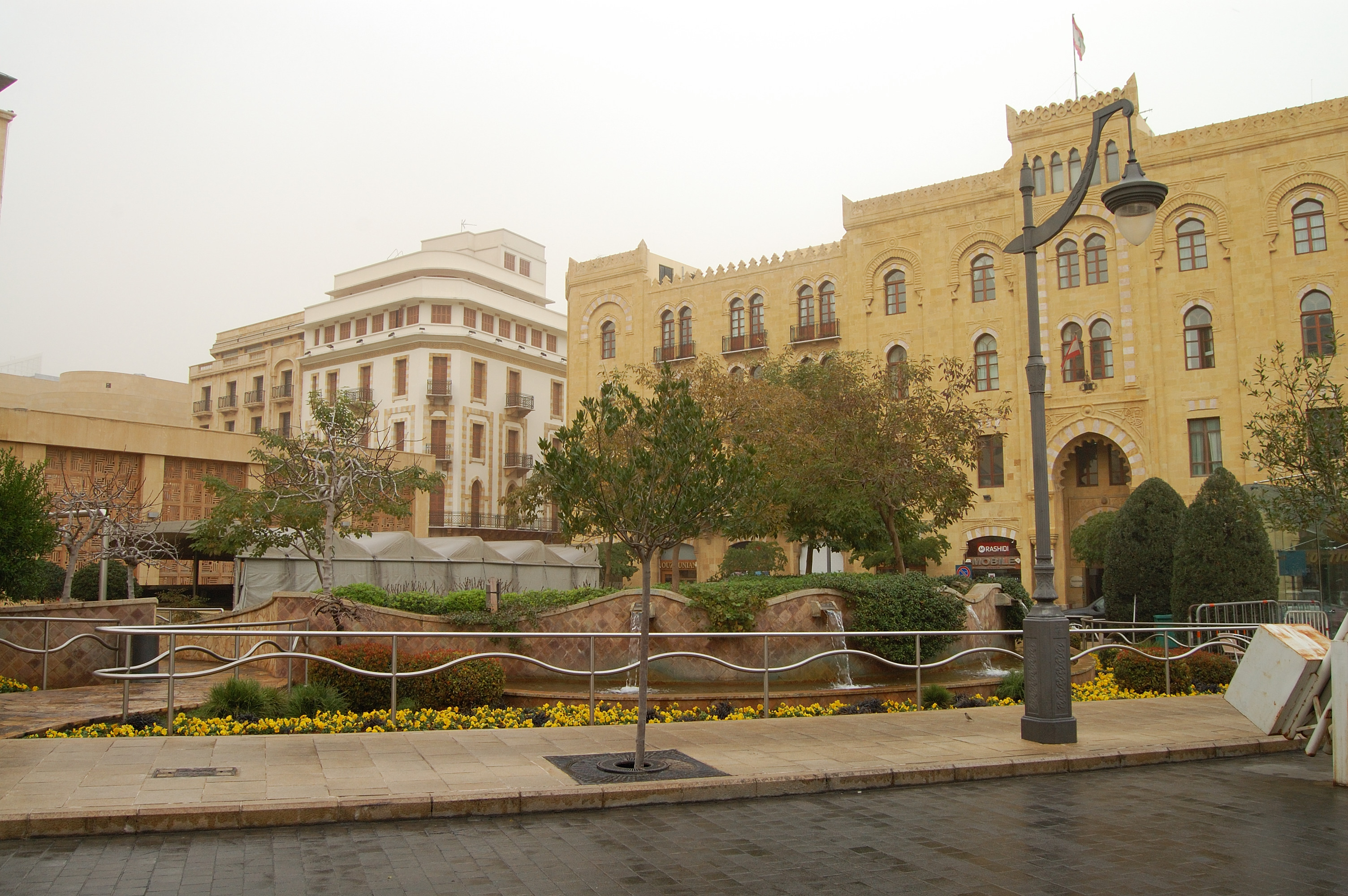
Buildings along Weygand Street

Rue Weygand is a street in Beirut's Central Business District. Originally, the street was named Rue Nouvelle as it was a new thoroughfare constructed as part of a modernization plan in 1915. Upon its completion, the street was renamed after Maxime Weygand, the High Commissioner of French-mandated Syria and Lebanon who served from 19 April 1923 to 29 November 1924.

Jean Lauffray, the French archeologist, revealed that Rue Weygand followed the decumanus of the ancient Roman colonia of Berytus (from which the modern city of Beirut grew). While Roman and Byzantine mosaic floors have been found, the street predates the Roman Empire as archeological digs have also uncovered evidence that the street was a commercial hub even prior to the Hellenization of Phoenicia.

Prior to the war, the number 2 tram ran from Terminus du Phare to Rue de Damas via Rue Weygand.

Rue Weygand is a one-way street that runs east–west, beginning at Boulevard George Haddad and turning into Rue Georges Picot that cuts through the Jewish quarter of Wadi Abu Jamil. The Municipality of Beirut is located on the street along with exclusive designer shops and hotels, such as Le Gray. The Beirut Souks are also located on Rue Weygand.

== In literature ==
- The Arms of the Mantis by Robert Charles

"Sam Terrell was at that moment prowling the rooftop of a high rise building on the Rue Weygand."

- The Man in the Middle by Hugh Atkinson

"Lawrence turned right into the Rue Weygand, changed down and accelerated past a crawl of Mercedes, Buicks and Cadillacs."

- Redemption: A Novel of War in Lebanon by Liston Pope

"Ligury turned left on Rue Weygand, approaching the center."

- The Song of the Goldencocks by Margaret Donnelly

"The taxi drove him around blocks and piles of collapsing buildings, then back to Rue Weygand, because Hamid wanted to show him a few archeological excavations that he pointed to, explaining, “Omari Grand Mosque, built over Roman temple..."

- The Tiller of Waters by Hoda Barakat

"I went out to Rue Maarad, thinking I would go as far as Rue Weygand and from there would go home to plant the shoots before they could wilt."

== See also ==
- Solidere
- Beirut Central District
