= Ben Chan (Filipino businessman) =

Filipino clothing businessman

- Born: Chan Tian Siu
- Occupation: Businessman
- Known for: Founder of Suyen Corporation, Bench brand

Chan Tian Siu, commonly known as Ben Chan, is a Filipino businessman who is known for establishing the clothing store chain Bench.

== Career ==
Ben Chan started his own T-shirt store business in 1987 that eventually became Bench managed under the family-owned Suyen Corporation. Bench is a contraction of Chan's own name.

In 2014, he received the Ernst & Young Entrepreneur of the Year Award.

Chan promotes the terno, selling the clothing apparel in his store. Suyen is a partner of the Ternocon convention and competition.

He also introduced Italian furniture brands in the Philippines such as Cappellini and Foscarini which led to him being conferred the Order of the Star of Italy in 2019.

== Personal life ==
Chan is a Chinese Filipino who has roots from Fujian. He is not Cantonese. He was born to Chan Lib and See Ying who emigrated to the Philippines.

His parents established Liwayway Marketing as a supplier of starch, flour and coffee. His brother, Carlos would expand the family business to include snack foods founding Liwayway Marketing China a company which produces Oishi products. Chan himself would learn interior design in San Francisco before going on to establish his own clothing brand in the Philippines.
