= Carlos Chan =

Carlos Chan may refer to:

- Carlos Chan (businessman)
- Carlos Chan (actor)
