= Deshaipet =

Village in Telangana, India

- Urban
- Location in Telangana, India Deshaipet (India)
- Coordinates: 18°00′08″N 79°36′47″E
- Country: India
- State: Telangana
- District: Warangal

Languages
  - Official: Telugu
- Time zone: UTC+5:30 (IST)
- PIN: 506006
- Vehicle registration: TS
- Website: telangana.gov.in

Deshaipet is a village in Warangal district, Telangana, India. Its principal industries are tanning, leather crafting, beedi manufacture and weaving.
