= Oishi (Philippine brand) =

Filipino snack brand

- Company type: Private
- Industry: Food and beverage industry
- Founded: 1946; 80 years ago
- Headquarters: Pasay, Philippines
- Area served: Southeast Asia, China, South Asia and South Africa
- Key people: Carlos Chan (Chairman and CEO)
- Products: Snacks, cereals, biscuits, milk and beverages
- Website: www.oishi.com.ph

Liwayway Marketing Corporation, doing business as Oishi (/oʊˈwɪʃiː/ OH-wih-SHEE), is a snack company based in the Philippines. Its headquarters are in Pasay. As of 2018, it is headed by Carlos Chan. In China, the company is known as Oishi Shanghaojia (上好佳OISHI).

== History ==
Oishi, started in 1946 as Liwayway, was originally a family-owned corn starch (Tagalog: gawgaw) and coffee repacking business. The name of the business, "Liwayway," meaning "dawn" in English, was selected to reflect the optimism of the Philippines following the aftermath of World War II. By 1966, in addition to distributing starch, the company also began to distribute basic commodities, coffee, and confectioneries. It was incorporated under the name Liwayway Marketing Corporation (LMC) in 1966.

Brothers Carlos and Manuel Chan, at the time, were behind the company. Their brother Ben is the founder of Bench, a Philippine clothing brand. The parents of the Chan brothers are immigrants to the Philippines from Jinjiang county, Quanzhou, Fujian Province, China.

The company began distributing Oishi Prawn Crackers and Kirei Yummy Flakes in 1974. The company claims to have been implementing technology from Japan to make their products.

In 2024, Oishi and CEMEX Asia Holdings Ltd. partnered to support sustainable disposal of plastic waste per commitment to environmental stewardship and circular economy principles in industrial operations. "Our partnership with Liwayway allows us to support them with the EPR law (Extended Producer Responsibility Act EPRA of 2022 Republic Act No. 11898), while it also contributes to our Future in Action agenda of becoming a net zero carbon emission company," said Luis Franco, Cemex CEO. Liwayway will channel plastic packaging waste to Cemex's Solid Cement plant for co-processing.

=== Expansion ===
Carlos Chan began prospecting on the expansion of Oishi to China in 1984, following the reform and opening up of the Chinese economy under Deng Xiaoping starting in 1978. Liwayway went under the name Oishi Shanghaojia, appending "Shanghaojia" (上好佳) to Oishi which literally means "top grade and high quality" in Chinese, and a pun for "尚好甲" (shiang ho jiak, "most tasty") in Hokkien. It entered a joint venture with two state-owned Chinese firms and opened its first overseas manufacturing plant in Pudong, Shanghai The company's China division set up its headquarters in Qingpu District, Shanghai. To improve distribution in China, the company established a factory network there. Oishi also established a presence in Vietnam in 1997 and in Myanmar in 1999. In 2006, factories were opened in Indonesia and Thailand. Interlink Direct Ltd. imports Oishi products from China to the United Kingdom. Operations were established in South Africa in 2017, Bangladesh in 2018, and Uzbekistan in 2019.

== Reception ==
In 1998, for his contributions to Shanghai, Carlos Chan received a "Magnolia Gold Award," a prize that recognizes expats who contribute to Shanghai's development. In 2005, the city of Shanghai made Carlos Chan an honorary citizen, and Oishi Shanghaojia was declared a "Shanghai famous brand" the following year.
