= Suyen Corporation =

Philippine conglomerate

- Company type: Private
- Founded: 1987; 39 years ago
- Founder: Ben Chan
- Headquarters: Bench Tower, Bonifacio Global City, Taguig, Philippines
- Key people: Ben Chan (Chairman)

Suyen Corporation is a Philippine conglomerate most known for the clothing brand Bench. It was founded by Ben Chan who also serves as the chairman of the company.

== Background ==
The company's name came from "Suyen" the name of the daughter of Nenita Lim, Chan's sister which is also the namesake of a children's boutique brand of the same name opened by Lim.

It is headquartered at the Bench Tower at the Bonifacio Global City in Taguig, Metro Manila. Suyen holds office in the 24-storey office since its inauguration in 2013.

== Brands ==
Suyen Corporation is most known for its clothing brand Bench which is the flagship brand of the company. It also owns other local clothing brands such as Human, its streetwear line and Kashieca, which caters to young women. Suyen also manages Bench Skin Expert, Bench Fix Salon, Bench Barbers, and PCX – a cosmetics and beauty shop. Suyen is also the distributor of products of the various clothing, apparel and cosmetics foreign brands in the Philippines.

The company is also involved in the food industry, managing the Philippine operations of Japanese chains Miasen, St. Marc Cafe, and Pablo (a cheese tart store chain), as well as Patchi, and Bench Cafe which was named after its flagship brand.
