= Textile industry in India =

The textile industry in India, traditionally after agriculture, is the only industry in the country that has generated large-scale employment for both skilled and unskilled labour. The textile industry continues to be the second-largest employment generating sector in India. It offers direct employment to over 35 million people in the country. India is the world's second largest exporter of textiles and clothing, and in the fiscal year 2022, the exports stood at US$44.4 billion. According to the Ministry of Textiles, the share of textiles in total exports during April–July 2010 was 11.04%. During 2009–2010, the Indian textile industry was pegged at US$55 billion, 64% of which serves domestic demand. In 2010, there were 2,500 textile weaving factories and 4,135 textile finishing factories in all of India. According to AT Kearney’s ‘Retail Apparel Index’, India was ranked as the fourth most promising market for apparel retailers in 2009.

India is the second largest producer of fibre. The country is the world's largest producer of cotton and jute. India is also the world's second largest producer of silk. Other fibres produced in India include wool, and man-made fibres. 100% FDI is allowed via automatic route in textile sector. Rieter, Trutzschler, Saurer, Soktas, Zambiati, Bilsar, Monti, CMT, E-land, Nisshinbo, Marks & Spencer, Zara, Promod, Benetton, and Levi’s are some of the foreign textile companies invested or working in India. Between January and July 2021, India exported textile products worth Rs 1.77 lakh crore, which is 52.6% more than the same period last year.

== History ==
Archaeological surveys and studies have indicated that the people of Harrapan civilization were familiar with weaving and spinning cotton as early as four thousand years ago. Reference to weaving and spinning materials is found in the Vedic Literature. There was textile trade in India during the early centuries. Cotton fragments from Gujarat have been found in tombs of Egypt, indicating the existence of export of Indian textiles to Egypt during the medieval era.

Large quantities of north Indian silks were traded through the Silk Road in China to the western countries(130 B.C.E. - 1453 C.E.). The Indian silks were often bartered for spices. During the late 17th and 18th century there were large exports of Indian cotton to the western countries to meet the need of the European industries during Industrial Revolution, apart from the domestic requirement at the Indian Ordnance Factories.

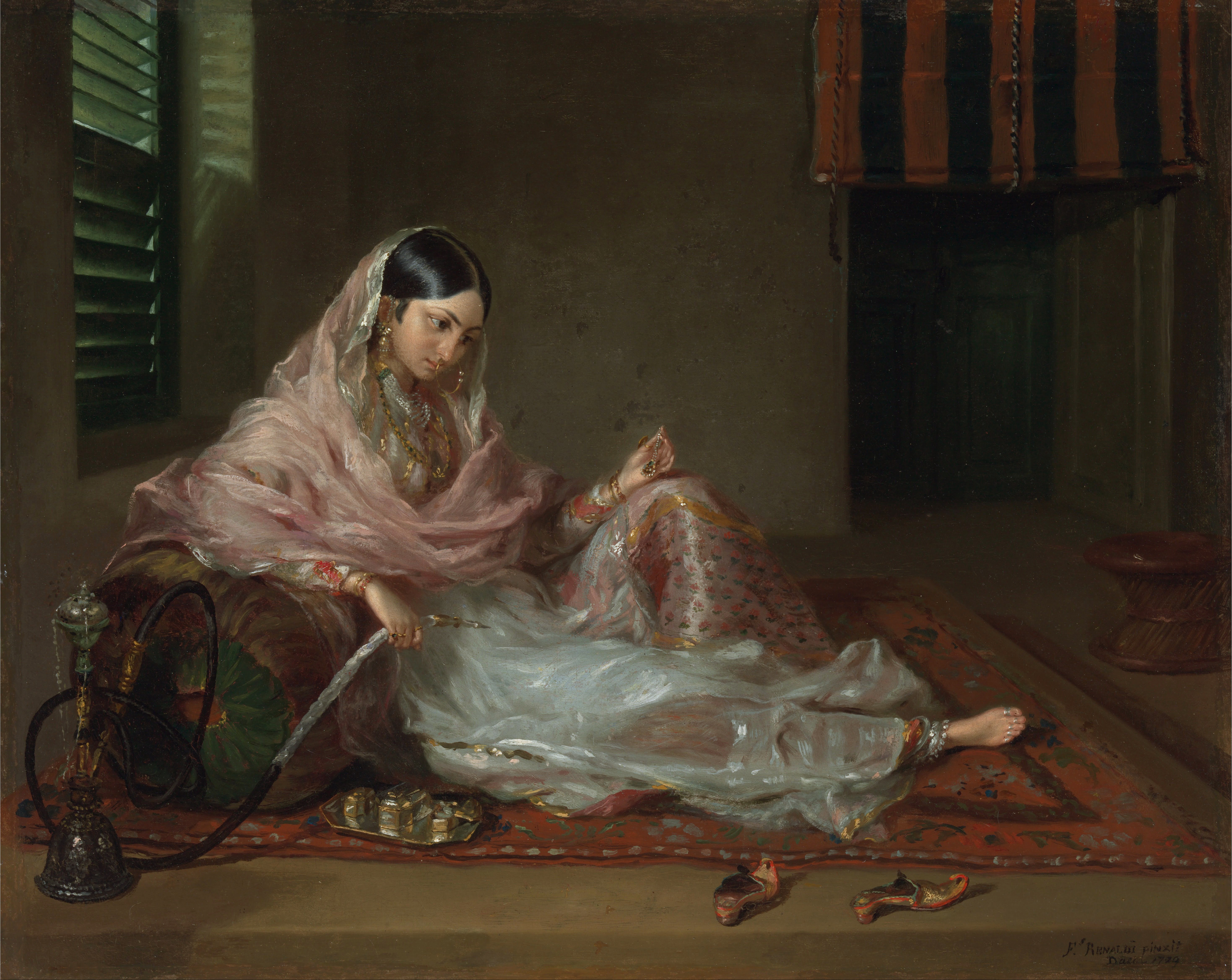
A woman from Dhaka clad dressed in fine Bengali muslin, 18th century

Up until the 18th century, Mughal Empire was the primary center of manufacturing in international trade. Up until 1750, India produced about 25% of the world's industrial output. The largest manufacturing industry in Mughal Empire (16th to 18th centuries) was textile manufacturing, particularly cotton textile manufacturing, which included the production of piece goods, calicos, and muslins, available unbleached and in a variety of colours. The cotton textile industry was responsible for a large part of the empire's international trade. Bengal had a 25% share of the global textile trade in the early 18th century. Bengal cotton textiles were the most important manufactured goods in world trade in the 18th century, consumed across the world from the Americas to Japan. The main center of cotton production was the Bengal Subah province, particularly around its capital city of Dhaka. As Karl Marx noted in 1853, the textile industry was a major component of economic income in the pre-colonial Indian economy, writing that "The hand-loom and the spinning-wheel, producing their regular myriads of spinners and weavers, were the pivots of the structure of that society".

Bengal accounted for more than 50% of textiles and around 80% of silks imported by the Dutch from Asia and marketed it to the world, Bengali silk and cotton textiles were exported in large quantities to Europe, Asia, and Japan, and Bengali muslin textiles from Dhaka were sold in Central Asia, where they were known as "daka" textiles. Indian textiles dominated the Indian Ocean trade for centuries, were sold in the Atlantic Ocean trade, and had a 38% share of the West African trade in the early 18th century, while Bengal calicos were major force in Europe, and Bengal textiles accounted for 30% of total British trade with Southern Europe in the early 18th century.

In early modern Europe, there was significant demand for textiles from the Mughal Empire, including cotton textiles and silk products. European fashion, for example, became increasingly dependent on textiles and silks imported from The Mughal Empire. In the late 17th and early 18th centuries, The Mughal Empire accounted for 95% of British imports from Asia, conducted through the auspices of the East India Company (EIC). After the abolition of slavery in British Empire, manufactures in Britain started to look for alternative sources of cheap cotton, eventually settling on the East India Company's possession in India. The EIC convinced many farmers to switch from subsistence farming to producing and exporting huge amounts of cotton, after a long period of government protectionism imposed over the British textile industry. Eventually, through the technical and marketing advances made possible by colonisation, the traditional method of artisan textile production declined significantly, and replaced with large scale factory production.

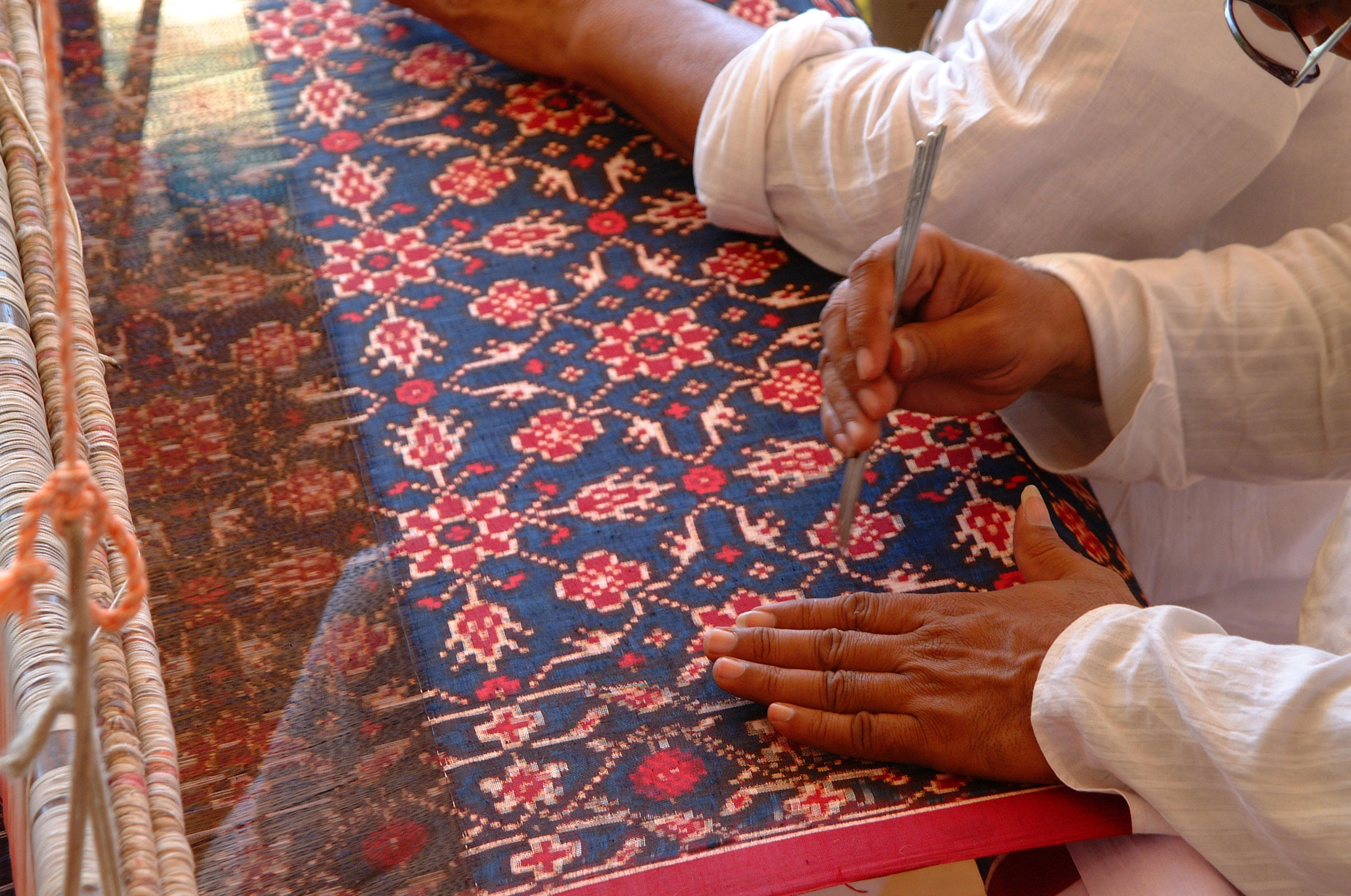
Textile artists demonstrate double ikat Patola weaving at the 2002 Smithsonian Folklife Festival.

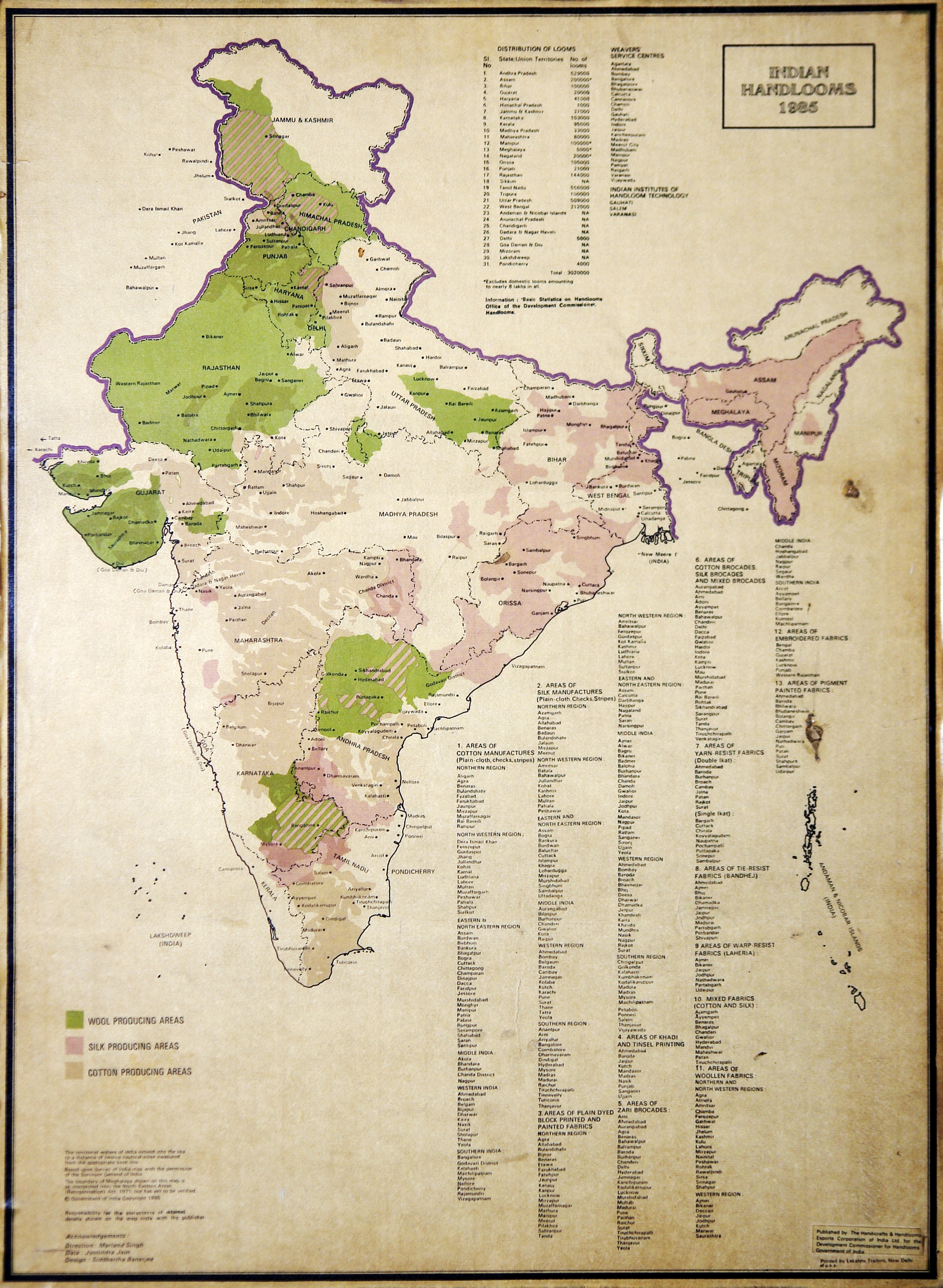
A map of Indian handlooms

== Cotton ==
In the early years, the cotton textile industry was concentrated in the cotton growing belt of Rajasthan, Maharashtra and Gujarat. Availability of raw materials, market, transport, labour, moist climate and other factors contributed to localisation. In the early twentieth century, this industry played a huge role in Bombay's economy but soon declined after independence. While spinning continues to be centralised in Maharashtra, Gujarat and Tamil Nadu, weaving is highly decentralised. As of 30 November 2011, there are 1,946 cotton textile mills in India, of which about 80% are in the private sector and the rest in the public and cooperative sector. Apart from these, there are several thousand small factories with three to ten looms.there is a committee established in India under 'Textile Committee Act 1963'. this committee sets the quality standards for textiles manufactured for sale in the internal market as well as for export.

India exports yarn to Japan, United States, United Kingdom, Russia, France, Nepal, Singapore, Sri Lanka and other countries. India has the second-largest installed capacity of spindles in the world, with 43.13 million spindles (30 March 2011) after China. Although India has a large share in world trade of cotton yarn, its trade in garments is only 4% of the world's total.

India has the largest cotton acreage, with 12,4 million hectares under cultivation, which accounts for around 36 percent of the global total of 34,1 million hectares.

== Jute ==
India is the largest producer of raw jute and jute goods and the third largest exporter after Bangladesh. There were about 80 jute mills in India in 2010–11, most of which are located in West Bengal, mainly along the banks of the Hooghly River, in a narrow belt (98 km long and 3 km wide).

In 2010-2011 the jute industry was supporting 0.37 million workers directly and another 400,000 small and marginal farmers who were engaged in the cultivation of jute.

Challenges faced by the industry include stiff competition in the international market from synthetic substitutes and from other countries such as Bangladesh, Brazil, Philippines, Egypt and Thailand. However, the internal demand has been on the rise due to Government policy of mandatory use of jute packaging. To stimulate demand, the products need to be diversified. In 2005, the National Jute Policy was formulated with the objective of improving quality, increasing productivity and enhancing the yield of the crop.

The main markets for jute are the United States, Canada, Russia, United Kingdom and Australia.

== Silk ==
India is the second largest silk producer (18% of the world's silk production) of world after China (70% of the global silk production and 90% of the world's silk exports). There are mainly four types of silk varieties produced by different species of silkworms namely Mulberry, Eri, Muga, Tropical Tasar and Temperate Tasar. India manufactures a diverse range of silk products, including clothing, household items, textiles, threads, floor coverings, and various accessories. These goods are crafted using locally sourced silk as the primary material.

== Ministry of Textile and Industry ==
In 2000, the Government of India passed the National Textile Policy. The major functions of the Ministry of Textiles are formulating policy and coordination of man-made fiber, cotton, jute, silk, wool industries, decentralization of power loom sector, promotion of exports, planning & economic analysis, finance and promoting use of information technology. The Ministry of Textiles is currently led by Giriraj Singh. Darshanaben Jardosh is currently Minister of State . The advisory boards for the ministry include All India Handlooms Board, All India Handicrafts Board, All India Power looms Board, Advisory Committee under Handlooms Reservation of Articles for Production and Co-ordination Council of Textiles Research Association. There are several public sector units and textile research associations across the country.

== See also ==
- Great Bombay textile strike
- Oil and gas industry in India

== Bibliography ==
- J.Forbes Watson (1866). The Textile Manufactures and the Costumes of the People of India. India Office by George Edward Eyre and William Spottiswoode, London.
- Illustrations of the Textile Manufactures of India. Victoria & Albert Museum, London. 1881.
- Albert Buell Lewis (1924). Block Prints from India for Textiles. Field Museum for Natural History, Chicago.
