= Patchi =

Lebanon-based chocolatier

Patchi Chocolate
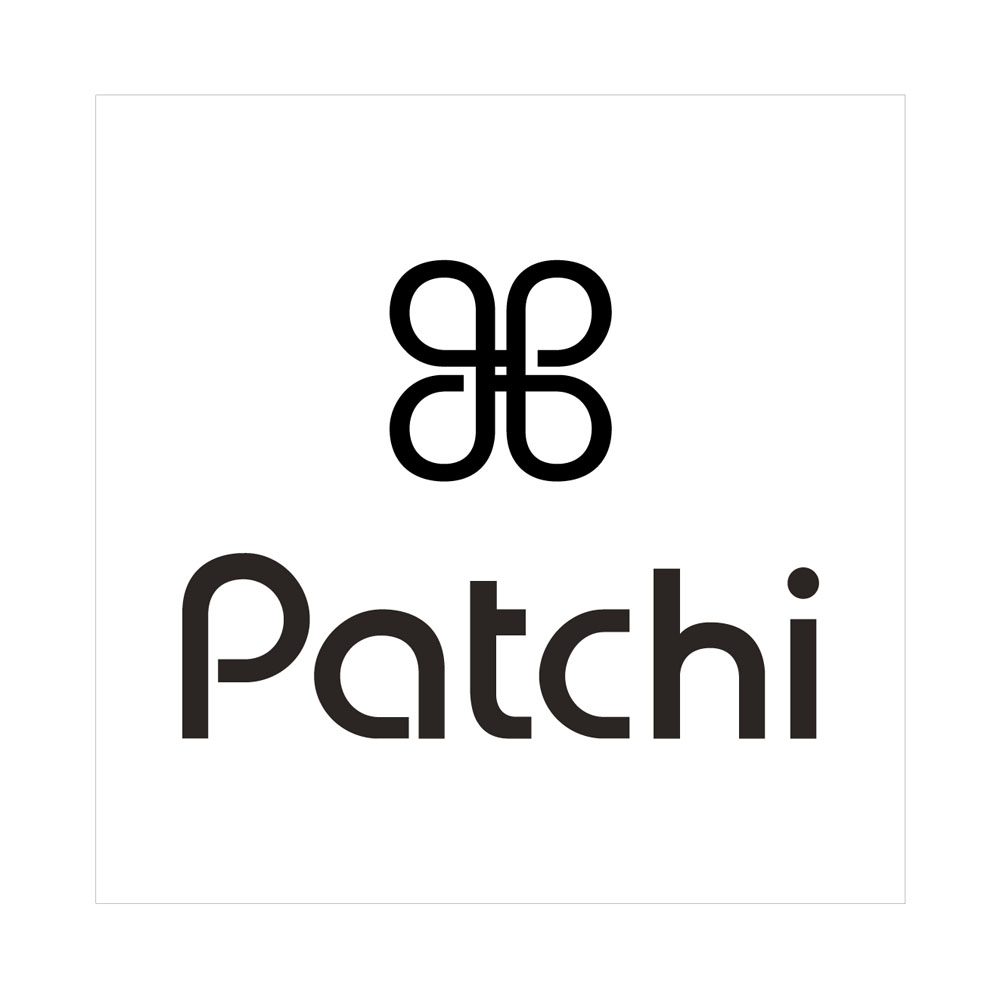
- Industry: Confectionery|Chocolate
- Founded: 1974
- Founder: Nizar Choucair
- Headquarters: Beirut, Lebanon
- Products: Chocolate
- Subsidiaries: Patchi Brunei, Patchi Malaysia
- Website: patchi.com

Patchi is a chocolatier based in Lebanon. Established by Nizar Choucair in 1974, it is distributed across much of the Middle East, and also sells chocolate internationally.

== History ==
Patchi is traced back to 1974 when Nizar Choucair opened one store on Hamra Street in Beirut, Lebanon. The company expanded to various national markets until 1999 when Patchi started selling in London and Paris. In July 2008, Patchi collaborated with Harrods to produce the most expensive line of chocolates. Patchi also creates chocolates customized to local tastes, events, and festivals. As of 2011, Patchi was regarded as one of the most innovative businesses in the Middle East.

Its founder, Nizar Choucair, died on June 18, 2024.

== Products ==
Patchi is a luxury brand for chocolate and chocolate gifts. All chocolates are handmade with all-natural ingredients.

The menu is famous for integrating roasted nuts (hazelnuts, pistachios, almonds), Gianduja, orange peel, dried strawberry bits, and more. Recently, Patchi introduced five new exotic flavors to its menu with Cotton Candy, Cheesecake, and Peanut Butter in some of the recipes.

== Availability ==
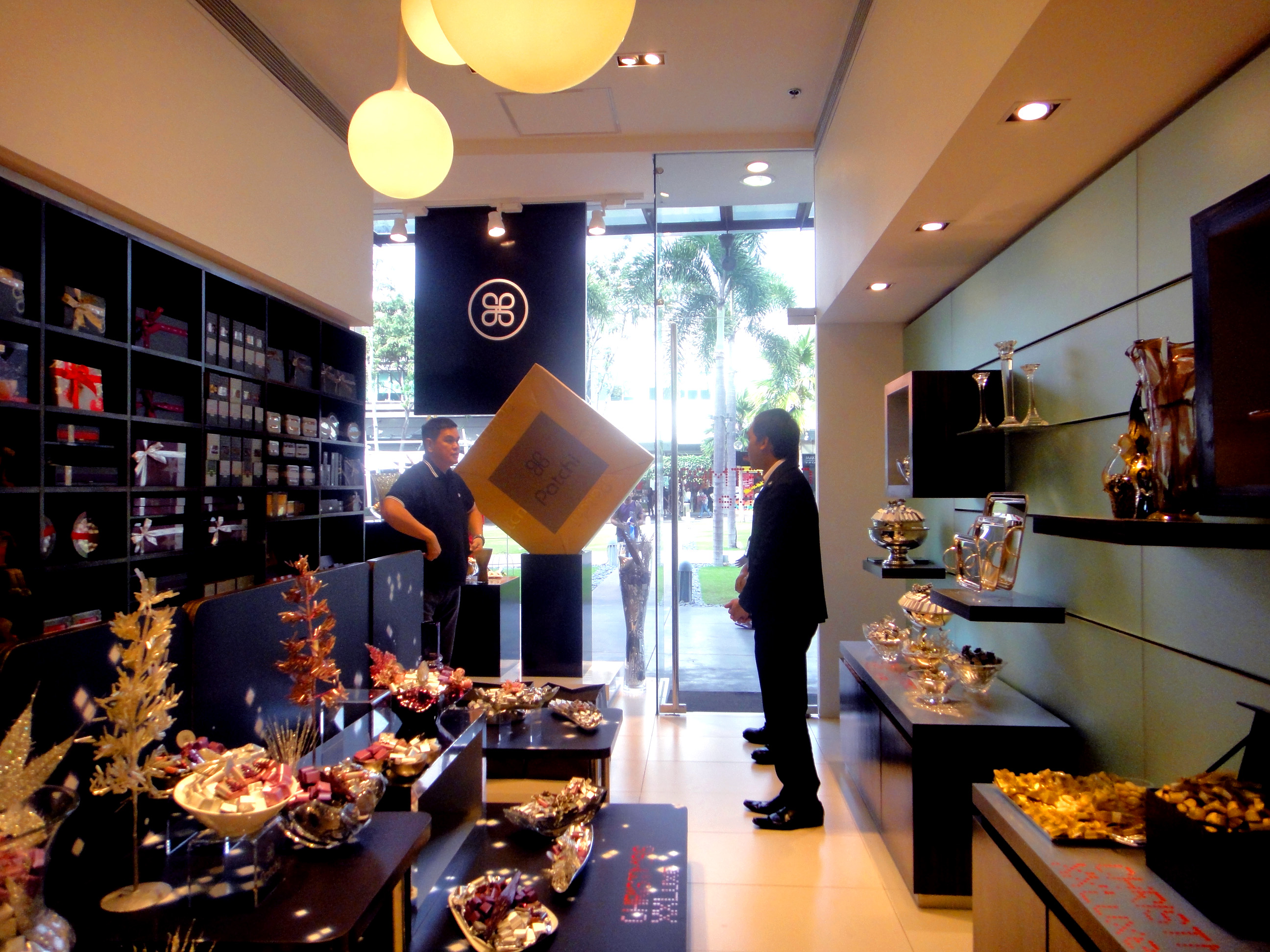
A Patchi outlet in Taguig, Philippines

Patchi operates in 32 countries, with the Middle East being its largest market.

It operates in Armenia, Azerbaijan, Kazakhstan, Bahrain, Brunei, Canada (online), Egypt, France, Indonesia, Ivory Coast, Jordan, Kingdom of Saudi Arabia, India, Kuwait, Lebanon, Malaysia, Morocco, Oman, Philippines, Qatar, Syria, Tunisia, United Arab Emirates, Ukraine, the United Kingdom, and the United States.

== Industrial network and divisions ==
Patchi has five factories, located in Lebanon, Saudi Arabia, the United Arab Emirates and Egypt.

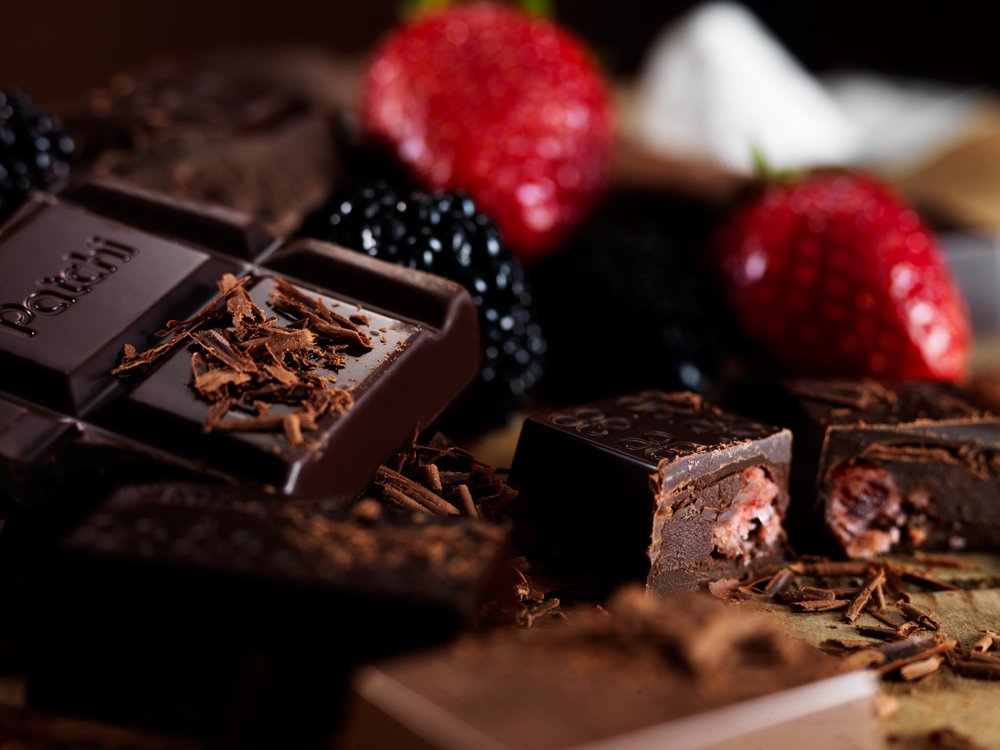
Crème Fraîche by Patchi
