= Bench (Philippine clothing brand) =

Philippine retail brand

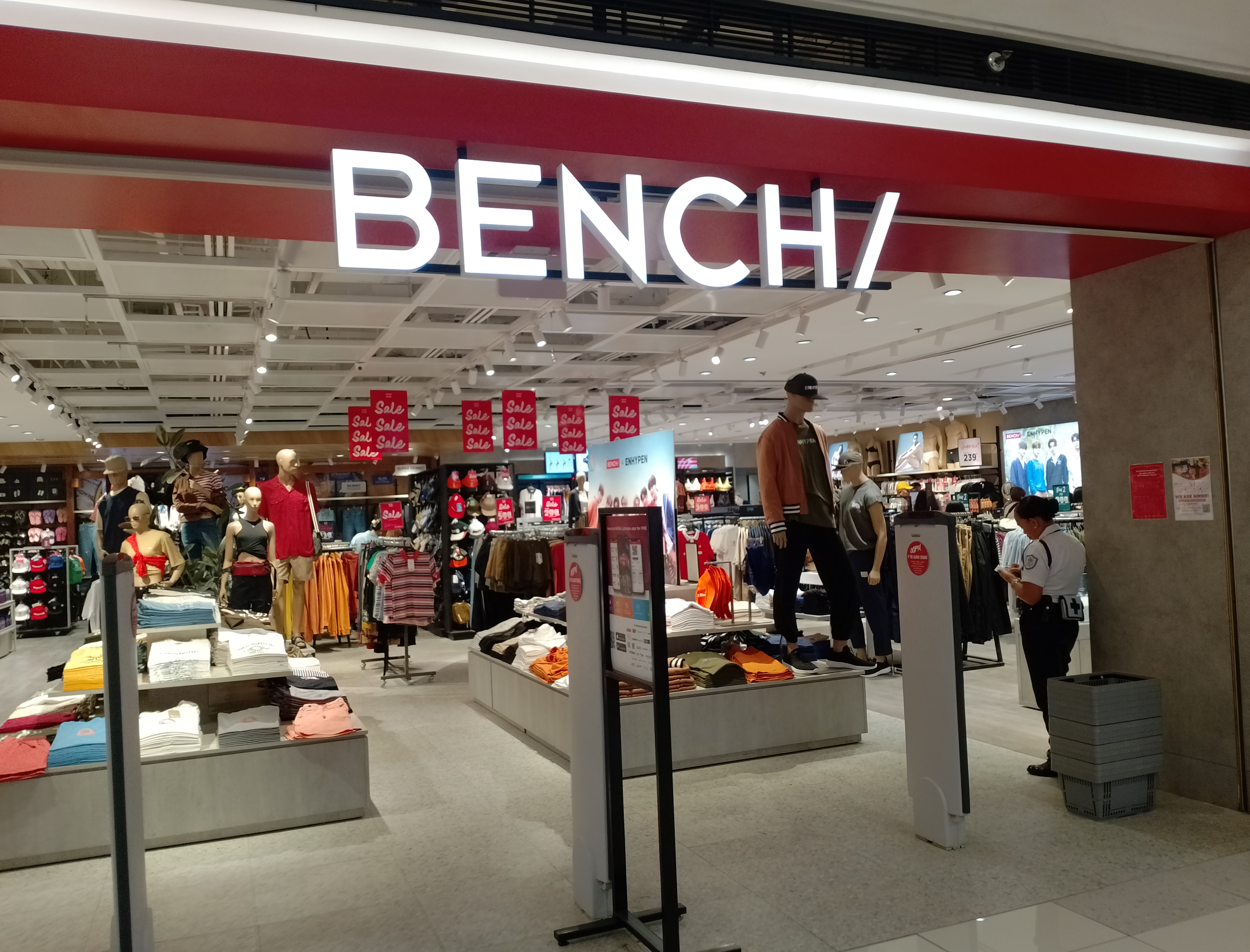
- A Bench store at SM City Cebu
- Product type: Apparel
- Current owner: Suyen Corporation
- Country: Philippines
- Introduced: August 3, 1987; 39 years ago
- Markets: Asia, North America, Oceania
- Website: shop.bench.com.ph

Bench (stylized as bench/ or BENCH/) is a Philippine clothing and lifestyle brand owned by Suyen Corporation. They sell a range of clothing including casualwear, underwear, and sportswear, as well as bags, accessories, footwear, and fragrances.

== History ==
Bench was established in 1987 by Ben Chan. Its first outlet was a small store selling men's T-shirts in an outlet of the SM Department Store (now SM Store). In 1991, Bench released its first television commercial featuring Filipino actor Richard Gomez as its endorser which set a standard on how the brand is promoted by its celebrity endorsers.

The company has since grown to include a ladies' line, underwear, fragrances, housewares, snacks and other lifestyle products. Bench has expanded to overseas territories, including the United States, Middle East, China, Myanmar, and Singapore.

In 2017, the first Bench Design Awards, a fashion design competition for young designers, was held.

Bench Coffee Station at One Ayala, Makati

The first Bench Cafe, named after the clothing line, opened in January 2018.

== Marketing ==
Bench is known for utilizing celebrity endorsements acquiring the services of Filipino and international figures to promote the clothing brand. In 1991, Bench released the television commercial Sculler which featured Richard Gomez rowing a boat which won best cinematography at the 12th Advertising Congress at the Araw Awards. In 1995, Bench began referring to international figures for endorsement with Chinese-American VJ for Channel V. In the COVID-19 pandemic period, Bench relied on Korean celebrities to take advantage of the popularity of Korean drama and K-pop.
