= Rue Maarad =

Street in Beirut, Lebanon

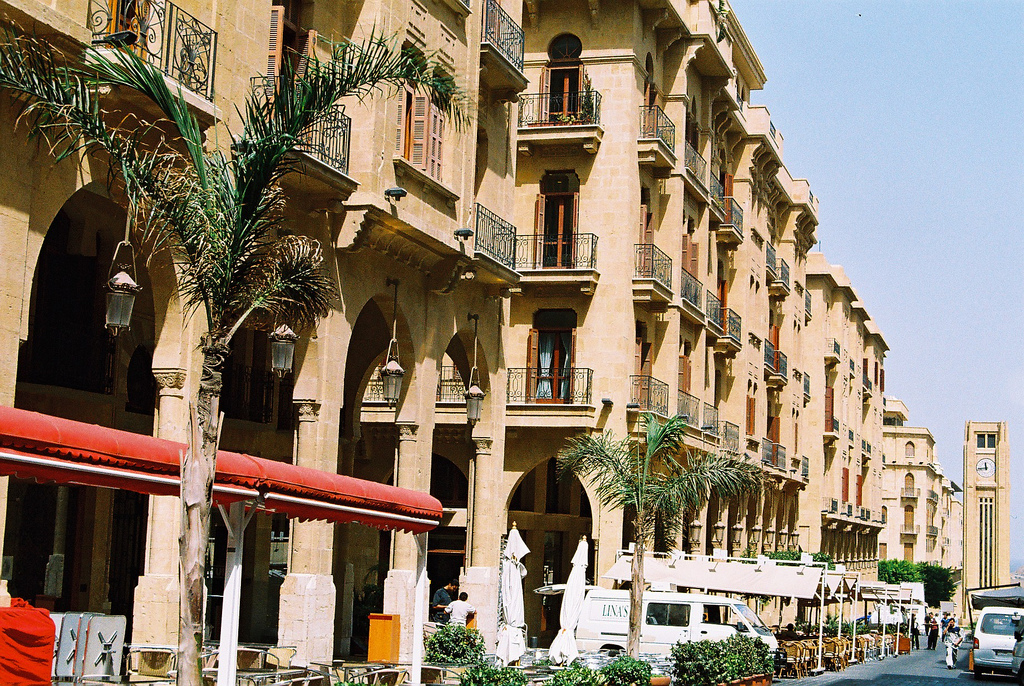
Maarad street leading to Nejmeh Square

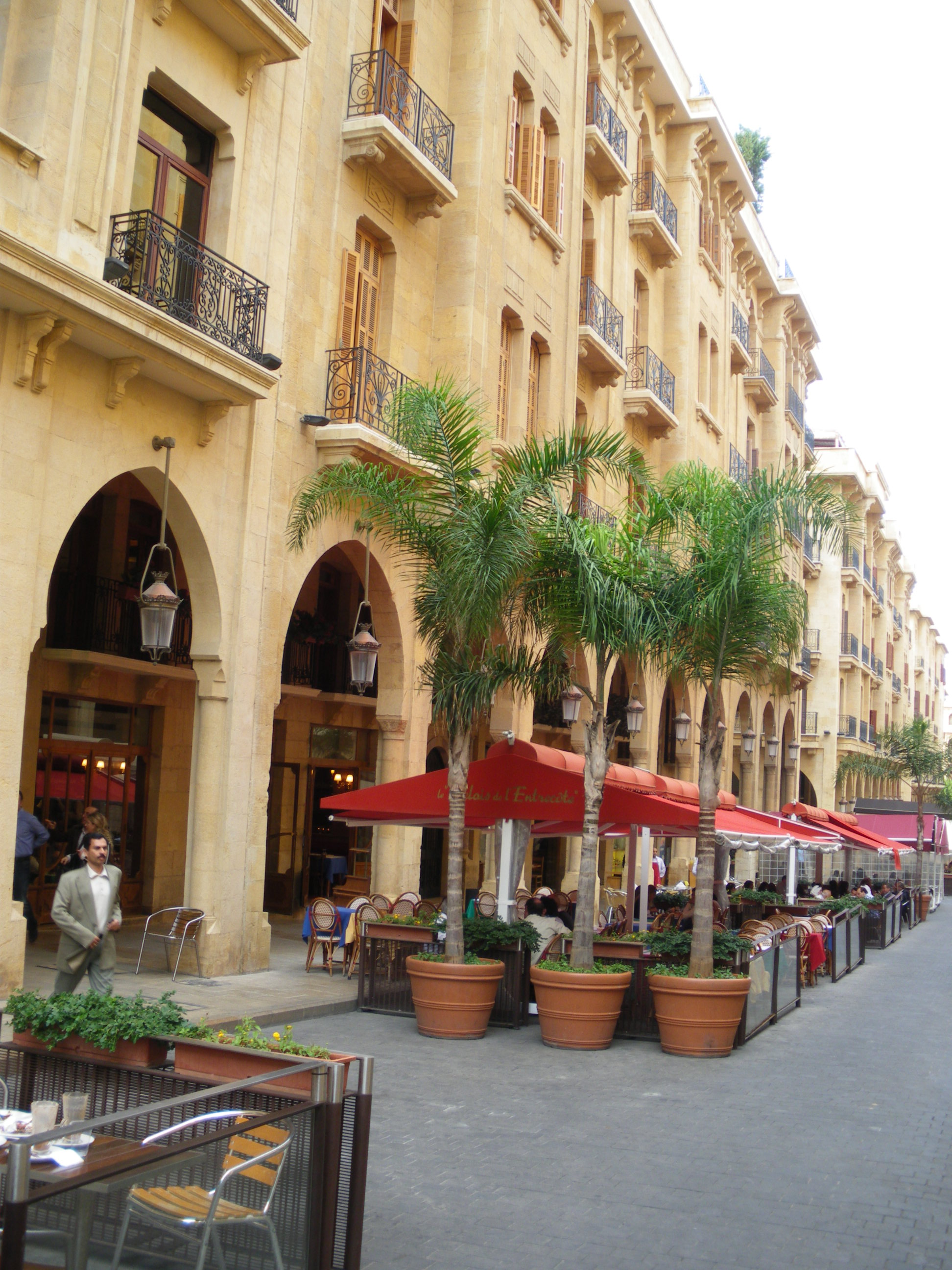
Sidewalk cafes along Maarad street

Rue Maarad (Arabic: شارع المعرض) is a street in Beirut, Lebanon. The street was conceived during the French Mandate period as a central commercial street radiating from Étoile Square. Its arched façades were inspired by the Rue de Rivoli in Paris.

== Construction ==
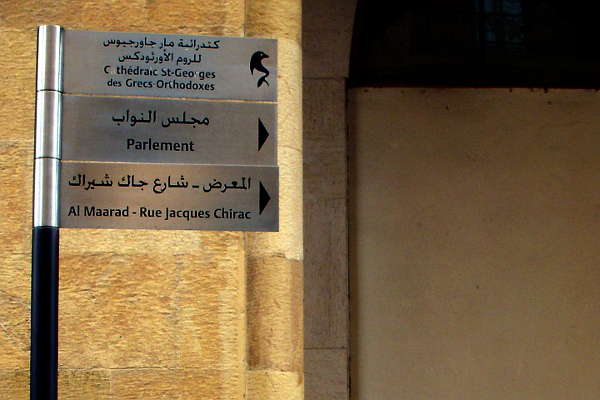
Maarad's street sign

Beirut Municipality developed plans to modernize the harbor and the city center. Plans were later updated during the French Mandate and Maarad street was conceived as a main street emanating from Étoile Square. Those plans foiled with the construction of the Grand Theatre. The street was named Maarad Street after the 1921 International Fair that took place in Beirut.

== History ==
Maarad Street (‘Maarad’ meaning exhibition in Arabic) was named after the 1921 International Fair, which brought attention to Beirut during the period of the French Mandate. Today named Jacques Chirac Street, it was part of the 1915 plan designed to connect the lower town beside the harbor, to the upper town that extended as far as the Pine Forest on the outskirts of Beirut. This extension was foiled, however, by the construction of the Grand Théâtre. In 1878, the Beirut Municipality developed plans to modernize the harbor and the city center. These plans were updated during the French Mandate, and Maarad Street was conceived as the central street radiating from Étoile Square. Its arched façades were inspired by the ‘Rue de Rivoli’ in Paris.

== Timeline ==
1878: Beirut Municipality developed plans to modernize the harbor and the city center.

1915: Plans designed to connect the lower town (by the harbor) to the upper town (by the Pine forest on the outskirts of Beirut). Plans later failed after the construction of the Grand Théâtre.

1921: Street was named Maarad Street (exhibition road in Arabic) after the International Fair that took place there that year.

== See also ==
- Grand Theatre, Lebanon
- Rue de Rivoli
- Place de l'Étoile
