= Carlos Chan (businessman) =

Filipino businessman

- 施恭旗
- Born: Chan Kiong Ki See
- Occupation: Businessman

Chan Kiong Ki See (Chinese: 施恭旗), commonly known as Carlos Chan, is a Filipino businessman who runs the Liwayway Group, the owner of the Oishi snack brand.

== Background ==
Chan is the eldest son of Chinese emigrants Chan Lib and See Ying from Fukien (now Fujian). His father first moved to the Philippines in 1914. His parents would start a cornstarch family business which would grow to be the Liwayway Group.

Together with his brother Manuel, Carlos Chan would diversify the Liwayway business in the 1970s by introducing the Oishi snack brand. In the 1980s, Chan would expand the business to China. Liwayway would also introduce the J.CO Donuts chain franchise to the Philippines.

At the Philippine Pavilion of Expo 2010 in Shanghai, Chan was conferred the Order of Sikatuna by President Gloria Macapagal-Arroyo.

The Management Association of the Philippines (MAP) conferred the MAP Management Man of the Year to Chan in 2021.

He has served as a special envoy to the People's Republic of China for the Philippine under various presidents. This includes Presidents Arroyo, Benigno Aquino III, and Rodrigo Duterte.
