= Promod =

French fashion store company

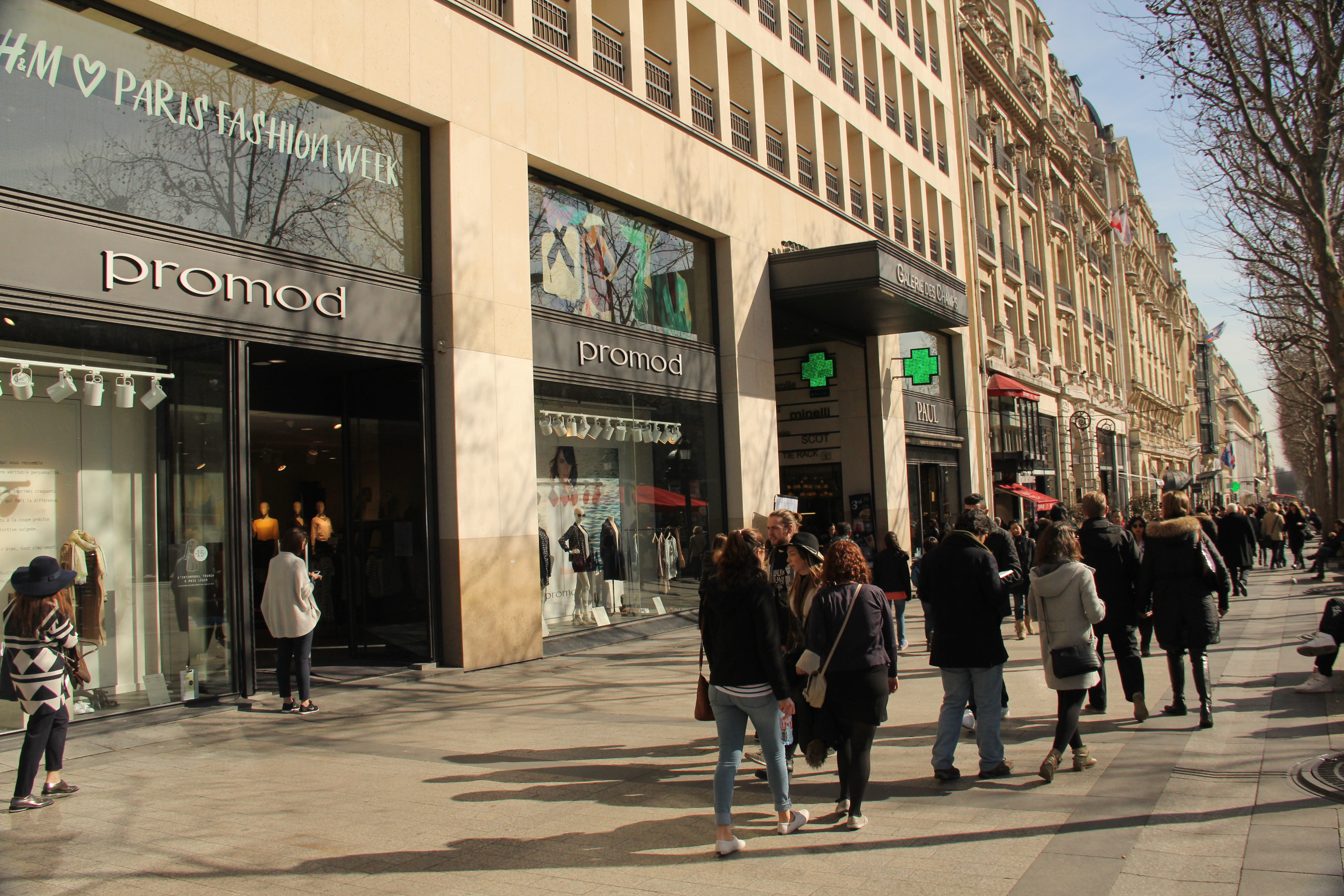
- Promod store on Champs-Élysées, Paris.
- Company type: Private
- Industry: Retail
- Founded: 1975; 51 years ago
- Founder: Francis Charles Pollet
- Headquarters: Marcq-en-Baroeul, France
- Number of locations: 517 (April 2022)
- Area served: France; Belgium; Luxembourg; Switzerland
- Key people: Julien Pollet
- Revenue: €342 million (2020)
- Owner: Pollet family
- Number of employees: 2,074 (2019)
- Website: www.promod.com

Promod is a French women's ready-to-wear retailer operating in France, Belgium, Switzerland and Luxembourg. The clothing brand can be found in their own shops, or in concessions inside larger retail shops.

Promod was founded as a family boutique in 1975 by Francis-Charles Pollet, one of the heirs of the founder of La Redoute where he spent the first part of his career. The brand established exclusively in France and Belgium until 1990, when started to develop more internationally and opened a subsidiary in Spain, followed by others mainly in Europe.

In 2014, Promod had over 1,066 stores in 52 countries with gross sales exceeded 1 billion euros.

In 2016, a decline in the profitability of foreign operations led the company to eliminate 130 jobs and close international franchise partnerships that led to the closure of about 500 stores mainly in Europe, which accounted for half of the total number of Promod stores.

In September 2018, Patrice Lepoutre left the management of the group in favor of Julien Pollet.

In 2024, Promod opens a boutique-laboratory combining second-hand goods, unsold items, sewing kits as well as workshops to introduce people to sewing and upcycling.
